= Shooting at the 2014 Asian Games – Men's 10 metre air rifle =

Men's 10 metre air rifle at the 2014 Asian Games
- Venue: Ongnyeon International Shooting Range
- Dates: 23 September 2014
- Competitors: 53 from 20 nations

Medalists
gold medal	Yang Haoran	China
silver medal	Cao Yifei	China
bronze medal	Abhinav Bindra	India

The men's 10 metre air rifle competition at the 2014 Asian Games in Incheon, South Korea was held on 23 September at the Ongnyeon International Shooting Range.

== Schedule ==
All times are Korea Standard Time (UTC+09:00)

Date	Time	Event
Tuesday, 23 September 2014	09:00	Qualification
Tuesday, 23 September 2014	11:45	Final

== Records ==
Prior to this competition, the existing world, Asian and Games records were as follows.

Qualification
World Record	Péter Sidi (HUN)	633.5	Munich, Germany	25 May 2013
Asian Record	Yang Haoran (CHN)	632.1	Granada, Spain	8 September 2014
Games Record	—	—	—	—
Final
World Record	Yang Haoran (CHN)	210.5	Munich, Germany	25 May 2013
Asian Record	Yang Haoran (CHN)	210.5	Munich, Germany	25 May 2013
Games Record	—	—	—	—

== Results ==
=== Qualification ===
Rank	Athlete	Series						Total	Notes
Rank	Athlete	1	2	3	4	5	6	Total	Notes
1	Cao Yifei (CHN)	104.9	104.9	105.8	104.6	105.5	105.0	630.7	GR
2	Yang Haoran (CHN)	105.2	105.4	105.7	104.2	103.3	105.4	629.2	
3	Liu Tianyou (CHN)	103.7	104.4	104.1	105.2	104.1	105.0	626.5	
4	Kim Sang-do (KOR)	103.7	105.5	104.1	105.1	103.4	104.3	626.1	
5	Abhinav Bindra (IND)	102.6	105.3	104.5	104.1	105.7	103.2	625.4	
6	Vadim Skorovarov (UZB)	104.2	103.6	104.3	105.6	103.2	104.4	625.3	
7	Pouria Norouzian (IRI)	105.3	102.4	104.0	103.2	103.9	104.1	622.9	
8	Kim Hyeon-jun (KOR)	101.7	105.1	102.7	103.2	104.3	105.3	622.3	
9	Nyantain Bayaraa (MGL)	104.3	102.6	103.8	104.3	103.2	103.9	622.1	
10	Lu Shao-chuan (TPE)	102.4	103.3	104.9	102.9	105.0	103.4	621.9	
11	Ali Al-Haiderabadi (BRN)	102.8	102.3	102.9	104.1	105.1	104.0	621.2	
12	Toshikazu Yamashita (JPN)	103.8	103.7	102.2	104.3	104.1	102.6	620.7	
13	Takayuki Matsumoto (JPN)	104.3	102.9	104.9	102.7	102.7	102.7	620.2	
14	Pongsaton Panyatong (THA)	103.0	103.9	104.1	101.0	103.3	104.4	619.7	
15	Abdullah Hel Baki (BAN)	102.5	104.5	101.5	102.9	105.0	103.2	619.6	
16	Yuriy Yurkov (KAZ)	103.9	103.1	102.5	102.7	105.0	102.4	619.6	
17	Han Jin-seop (KOR)	103.8	105.5	102.7	104.5	101.7	101.0	619.2	
18	Hossein Bagheri (IRI)	101.4	101.9	105.6	103.1	104.3	102.7	619.0	
19	Mehdi Jafari Pouya (IRI)	104.0	103.1	101.5	102.8	104.6	102.9	618.9	
20	Ravi Kumar (IND)	104.1	102.8	102.6	102.2	104.5	102.7	618.9	
21	Sanjeev Rajput (IND)	101.9	105.6	103.1	102.2	101.5	104.4	618.7	
22	Vyacheslav Skoromnov (QAT)	103.5	104.7	102.0	102.3	101.7	103.7	617.9	
23	Ruslan Ismailov (KGZ)	103.4	104.6	100.5	103.1	101.7	104.2	617.5	
24	Ong Jun Hong (SIN)	103.7	102.7	101.3	101.5	102.8	105.0	617.0	
25	Ezuan Nasir Khan (MAS)	103.2	103.4	101.9	102.8	103.0	102.3	616.6	
26	Igor Pirekeyev (KAZ)	100.2	104.1	103.4	104.1	101.4	102.6	615.8	
27	Apichakli Ponglaokham (THA)	102.4	101.0	102.8	103.9	102.3	102.9	615.3	
28	Sean Tay (SIN)	101.8	102.2	102.7	102.3	102.6	103.5	615.1	
29	Dondovyn Ganzorig (MGL)	104.1	102.8	102.8	103.2	100.8	101.1	614.8	
30	Boldbaataryn Bishrel (MGL)	100.3	100.2	103.6	102.4	103.5	103.9	613.9	
31	Faiz Al-Anazi (KSA)	100.3	102.0	100.5	104.3	102.7	104.0	613.8	
32	Md Zesimuzzaman (BAN)	102.3	100.8	102.5	102.8	102.2	103.2	613.8	
33	Daler Erov (TJK)	101.8	101.5	101.3	102.6	103.0	103.4	613.6	
34	Ali Al-Muhannadi (QAT)	102.0	102.8	102.3	101.4	103.4	101.7	613.6	
35	Hussain Al-Harbi (KSA)	100.8	102.8	101.7	102.1	101.2	104.3	612.9	
36	Saidkhon Sayfuddinov (UZB)	101.3	101.7	102.9	103.1	102.0	101.9	612.9	
37	Khaled Al-Subaie (KUW)	101.3	101.8	100.9	103.6	102.2	102.9	612.7	
38	Zeeshan Farid (PAK)	102.7	103.1	103.9	101.9	100.3	99.8	611.7	
39	Mahmood Haji (BRN)	101.1	102.2	102.6	101.3	103.6	100.4	611.2	
40	Midori Yajima (JPN)	102.3	102.3	101.5	102.0	102.8	99.2	610.1	
41	Ratmir Mindiyarov (KAZ)	100.3	104.1	101.4	103.4	100.5	100.1	609.8	
42	Khalid Al-Anazi (KSA)	100.7	99.9	100.3	102.4	101.8	103.5	608.6	
43	Siddique Umer (PAK)	101.9	99.9	103.3	101.5	100.0	101.6	608.2	
44	Varavut Majchacheep (THA)	102.5	101.5	102.3	101.2	99.0	101.6	608.1	
45	Mahmodul Hasan (BAN)	101.3	102.6	98.8	102.4	99.8	101.6	606.5	
46	Keith Chan (SIN)	98.3	101.3	100.3	102.3	103.8	100.5	606.5	
47	Mohd Hadafi Jaafar (MAS)	98.4	103.5	101.5	98.1	103.2	99.2	603.9	
48	Mohd Zubair Mohammad (MAS)	99.1	101.9	100.8	100.1	101.5	100.1	603.5	
49	Sultan Al-Osaimi (KUW)	98.1	101.9	103.4	100.1	100.3	99.2	603.0	
50	Pavel Savinich (UZB)	99.5	99.1	103.9	99.7	99.9	100.8	602.9	
51	Todzhiddin Valiev (TJK)	97.9	102.3	102.6	100.9	101.3	96.9	601.9	
52	Mohammed Al-Sunaidi (QAT)	100.2	98.3	98.1	102.1	100.9	99.7	599.3	
53	Umed Usmanov (TJK)	97.6	97.9	102.5	98.2	100.0	102.5	598.7	

=== Final ===
Rank	Athlete	1st stage		2nd stage – Elimination							S-off	Notes
Rank	Athlete	1	2	1	2	3	4	5	6	7	S-off	Notes
1st place, gold medalist(s)	Yang Haoran (CHN)	31.8	62.6	82.7	103.7	125.1	146.5	167.1	188.2	209.6		GR
2nd place, silver medalist(s)	Cao Yifei (CHN)	30.4	62.6	83.4	104.1	125.1	146.2	167.4	188.4	208.9		
3rd place, bronze medalist(s)	Abhinav Bindra (IND)	31.1	61.9	83.1	104.2	124.1	145.0	165.8	187.1			
4	Pouria Norouzian (IRI)	30.8	62.2	83.0	104.1	124.7	145.7	165.6				
5	Liu Tianyou (CHN)	30.3	60.1	81.5	102.8	123.3	143.8					
6	Kim Sang-do (KOR)	30.6	61.1	81.0	102.0	122.8						
7	Kim Hyeon-jun (KOR)	30.3	60.0	80.5	101.7							
8	Vadim Skorovarov (UZB)	29.4	59.6	80.2								
