= Shooting at the 2014 Asian Games – Men's 50 metre rifle three positions =

Men's 50 metre rifle 3 positions at the 2014 Asian Games
- Venue: Ongnyeon International Shooting Range
- Dates: 27 September 2014
- Competitors: 44 from 17 nations

Medalists
| gold medal | Cao Yifei | China |
| silver medal | Zhu Qinan | China |
| bronze medal | Chain Singh | India |

The men's 50 metre rifle three positions competition at the 2014 Asian Games in Incheon, South Korea was held on 27 September at the Ongnyeon International Shooting Range.

== Schedule ==
All times are Korea Standard Time (UTC+09:00)

| Date | Time | Event |
|---|---|---|
| Saturday, 27 September 2014 | 09:00 | Qualification |
| Saturday, 27 September 2014 | 13:15 | Final |

== Records ==
Prior to this competition, the existing world, Asian and Games records were as follows.

Qualification
| World Record | Nazar Louginets (RUS) | 1186 | Munich, Germany | 12 June 2014 |
| Asian Record | Cao Yifei (CHN) | 1181 | Munich, Germany | 12 June 2014 |
| Games Record | — | — | — | — |
Final
| World Record | Nazar Louginets (RUS) | 462.5 | Munich, Germany | 12 June 2014 |
| Asian Record | Cao Yifei (CHN) | 459.5 | Maribor, Slovenia | 20 June 2014 |
| Games Record | — | — | — | — |

== Results ==
=== Qualification ===
| Rank | Athlete | Kneeling | | | | Prone | | | | Standing | | | | Total | Xs | Notes |
| Rank | Athlete | 1 | 2 | 3 | 4 | 1 | 2 | 3 | 4 | 1 | 2 | 3 | 4 | Total | Xs | Notes |
|---|---|---|---|---|---|---|---|---|---|---|---|---|---|---|---|---|
| 1 | Zhu Qinan (CHN) | 96 | 97 | 96 | 98 | 100 | 100 | 98 | 100 | 97 | 96 | 97 | 96 | 1171 | 62 | GR |
| 2 | Kim Jong-hyun (KOR) | 99 | 100 | 99 | 100 | 100 | 99 | 100 | 100 | 90 | 94 | 96 | 93 | 1170 | 71 | |
| 3 | Toshikazu Yamashita (JPN) | 98 | 98 | 97 | 96 | 99 | 98 | 98 | 100 | 96 | 96 | 96 | 95 | 1167 | 55 | |
| 4 | Cao Yifei (CHN) | 98 | 97 | 96 | 96 | 98 | 99 | 99 | 98 | 99 | 94 | 97 | 95 | 1166 | 61 | |
| 5 | Han Jin-seop (KOR) | 97 | 97 | 98 | 98 | 98 | 100 | 98 | 100 | 96 | 94 | 97 | 93 | 1166 | 58 | |
| 6 | Kang Hongwei (CHN) | 95 | 98 | 96 | 98 | 99 | 98 | 100 | 98 | 97 | 97 | 96 | 93 | 1165 | 56 | |
| 7 | Chain Singh (IND) | 97 | 97 | 96 | 95 | 97 | 99 | 99 | 100 | 97 | 98 | 95 | 94 | 1164 | 51 | |
| 8 | Igor Pirekeyev (KAZ) | 97 | 96 | 98 | 96 | 99 | 100 | 98 | 100 | 92 | 95 | 96 | 95 | 1162 | 53 | |
| 9 | Yuriy Yurkov (KAZ) | 97 | 97 | 96 | 96 | 98 | 99 | 99 | 99 | 95 | 96 | 97 | 92 | 1161 | 51 | |
| 10 | Midori Yajima (JPN) | 98 | 96 | 95 | 100 | 96 | 100 | 99 | 100 | 93 | 95 | 94 | 94 | 1160 | 55 | |
| 11 | Nyantain Bayaraa (MGL) | 95 | 93 | 98 | 96 | 98 | 98 | 99 | 100 | 94 | 95 | 97 | 96 | 1159 | 50 | |
| 12 | Sanjeev Rajput (IND) | 95 | 96 | 93 | 98 | 100 | 98 | 100 | 97 | 94 | 95 | 95 | 98 | 1159 | 38 | |
| 13 | Nguyễn Duy Hoàng (VIE) | 94 | 97 | 94 | 96 | 99 | 98 | 99 | 96 | 94 | 96 | 96 | 98 | 1157 | 49 | |
| 14 | Vyacheslav Skoromnov (QAT) | 97 | 97 | 99 | 96 | 99 | 98 | 99 | 97 | 96 | 93 | 92 | 94 | 1157 | 49 | |
| 15 | Gagan Narang (IND) | 96 | 97 | 99 | 94 | 99 | 99 | 98 | 99 | 98 | 92 | 93 | 93 | 1157 | 46 | |
| 16 | Napis Tortungpanich (THA) | 96 | 93 | 96 | 98 | 99 | 97 | 97 | 99 | 97 | 92 | 95 | 97 | 1156 | 50 | |
| 17 | Hamed Al-Khatri (OMA) | 97 | 98 | 98 | 97 | 98 | 97 | 99 | 99 | 92 | 91 | 90 | 98 | 1154 | 44 | |
| 18 | Takayuki Matsumoto (JPN) | 97 | 98 | 95 | 99 | 96 | 97 | 97 | 97 | 96 | 97 | 94 | 91 | 1154 | 42 | |
| 19 | Pavel Savinich (UZB) | 98 | 99 | 96 | 96 | 95 | 99 | 94 | 98 | 93 | 94 | 94 | 96 | 1152 | 41 | |
| 20 | Ratmir Mindiyarov (KAZ) | 95 | 92 | 97 | 94 | 100 | 100 | 95 | 99 | 92 | 97 | 92 | 98 | 1151 | 45 | |
| 21 | Kwon Jun-cheol (KOR) | 95 | 95 | 94 | 96 | 99 | 100 | 99 | 99 | 90 | 97 | 91 | 93 | 1148 | 49 | |
| 22 | Faiz Al-Anazi (KSA) | 96 | 95 | 97 | 95 | 98 | 97 | 94 | 96 | 95 | 97 | 93 | 94 | 1147 | 44 | |
| 23 | Sasan Shahsavari (IRI) | 95 | 97 | 98 | 96 | 97 | 97 | 99 | 95 | 94 | 93 | 91 | 94 | 1146 | 44 | |
| 24 | Mehdi Jafari Pouya (IRI) | 93 | 96 | 99 | 96 | 99 | 99 | 96 | 98 | 94 | 93 | 91 | 92 | 1146 | 33 | |
| 25 | Boldbaataryn Bishrel (MGL) | 92 | 95 | 99 | 95 | 97 | 96 | 98 | 96 | 95 | 95 | 93 | 93 | 1144 | 43 | |
| 26 | Phùng Lê Huyên (VIE) | 93 | 96 | 98 | 97 | 100 | 98 | 99 | 98 | 91 | 95 | 90 | 88 | 1143 | 48 | |
| 27 | Olzodyn Enkhsaikhan (MGL) | 90 | 98 | 95 | 97 | 96 | 99 | 100 | 99 | 90 | 92 | 93 | 93 | 1142 | 42 | |
| 28 | Varavut Majchacheep (THA) | 93 | 96 | 97 | 91 | 99 | 95 | 97 | 97 | 94 | 95 | 96 | 91 | 1141 | 32 | |
| 29 | Ali Al-Muhannadi (QAT) | 94 | 94 | 93 | 97 | 98 | 98 | 98 | 96 | 94 | 91 | 94 | 93 | 1140 | 39 | |
| 30 | Khalid Al-Anazi (KSA) | 92 | 94 | 94 | 95 | 98 | 98 | 98 | 98 | 94 | 93 | 92 | 94 | 1140 | 38 | |
| 31 | Mohd Zubair Mohammad (MAS) | 96 | 94 | 91 | 99 | 99 | 96 | 96 | 96 | 91 | 93 | 94 | 93 | 1138 | 38 | |
| 32 | Hossein Bagheri (IRI) | 93 | 94 | 95 | 97 | 96 | 96 | 99 | 97 | 89 | 95 | 90 | 95 | 1136 | 30 | |
| 33 | Tevarit Majchacheep (THA) | 93 | 98 | 90 | 96 | 98 | 99 | 96 | 100 | 94 | 88 | 87 | 91 | 1130 | 38 | |
| 34 | Mohd Hadafi Jaafar (MAS) | 92 | 96 | 96 | 92 | 97 | 97 | 97 | 96 | 93 | 94 | 89 | 91 | 1130 | 33 | |
| 35 | Ruslan Ismailov (KGZ) | 93 | 93 | 90 | 95 | 97 | 100 | 95 | 96 | 94 | 92 | 92 | 93 | 1130 | 30 | |
| 36 | Ayaz Tahir (PAK) | 93 | 97 | 98 | 93 | 95 | 96 | 100 | 94 | 87 | 92 | 87 | 96 | 1128 | 44 | |
| 37 | Hussain Al-Harbi (KSA) | 93 | 94 | 92 | 91 | 95 | 99 | 99 | 97 | 93 | 92 | 85 | 93 | 1123 | 36 | |
| 38 | Ezuan Nasir Khan (MAS) | 91 | 96 | 90 | 92 | 99 | 99 | 97 | 99 | 89 | 94 | 91 | 85 | 1122 | 37 | |
| 39 | Mohammed Al-Hattali (OMA) | 94 | 94 | 96 | 91 | 98 | 99 | 97 | 95 | 86 | 90 | 88 | 93 | 1121 | 28 | |
| 40 | Mohammed Al-Sunaidi (QAT) | 90 | 91 | 99 | 94 | 96 | 98 | 97 | 99 | 91 | 87 | 87 | 89 | 1118 | 26 | |
| 41 | Siddique Umer (PAK) | 94 | 94 | 94 | 92 | 98 | 97 | 98 | 95 | 89 | 89 | 87 | 90 | 1117 | 31 | |
| 42 | Dương Anh Quân (VIE) | 87 | 95 | 96 | 96 | 96 | 97 | 93 | 95 | 94 | 87 | 91 | 88 | 1115 | 39 | |
| 43 | Khaled Al-Subaie (KUW) | 93 | 95 | 89 | 92 | 98 | 96 | 96 | 96 | 89 | 89 | 89 | 86 | 1108 | 33 | |
| 44 | Majed Al-Osaimi (KUW) | 90 | 89 | 85 | 88 | 96 | 96 | 96 | 82 | 71 | 87 | 83 | 90 | 1053 | 19 | |

=== Final ===
| Rank | Athlete | Kneeling | | | Prone | | | Standing – Elimination | | | | | | | S-off | Notes |
| Rank | Athlete | 1 | 2 | 3 | 1 | 2 | 3 | 1 | 2 | 3 | 4 | 5 | 6 | 7 | S-off | Notes |
|---|---|---|---|---|---|---|---|---|---|---|---|---|---|---|---|---|
| 1st place, gold medalist(s) | Cao Yifei (CHN) | 51.4 | 101.5 | 152.0 | 203.8 | 254.3 | 306.5 | 357.9 | 405.4 | 416.0 | 426.4 | 436.5 | 446.1 | 455.5 | | GR |
| 2nd place, silver medalist(s) | Zhu Qinan (CHN) | 49.9 | 101.8 | 153.4 | 205.2 | 256.2 | 307.7 | 356.9 | 407.7 | 417.3 | 427.0 | 437.6 | 445.8 | 455.2 | | |
| 3rd place, bronze medalist(s) | Chain Singh (IND) | 47.4 | 99.4 | 150.7 | 201.0 | 252.7 | 305.1 | 354.1 | 401.3 | 412.1 | 422.8 | 432.3 | 441.7 | | | |
| 4 | Kang Hongwei (CHN) | 48.7 | 99.0 | 149.9 | 201.1 | 252.0 | 303.6 | 353.2 | 401.9 | 412.1 | 422.0 | 430.3 | | | | |
| 5 | Toshikazu Yamashita (JPN) | 50.5 | 98.8 | 149.1 | 200.5 | 252.6 | 304.0 | 351.4 | 400.3 | 410.4 | 420.6 | | | | | |
| 6 | Igor Pirekeyev (KAZ) | 49.1 | 99.7 | 148.3 | 199.4 | 251.3 | 303.0 | 351.8 | 401.4 | 410.3 | | | | | | |
| 7 | Kim Jong-hyun (KOR) | 50.7 | 101.4 | 151.9 | 202.2 | 251.2 | 303.0 | 350.0 | 399.5 | | | | | | | |
| 8 | Han Jin-seop (KOR) | 50.2 | 101.9 | 150.9 | 201.6 | 252.5 | 304.3 | 351.9 | 399.2 | | | | | | | |
