= Shooting at the 2010 Asian Games – Men's 50 metre rifle three positions =

Men's 50 metre rifle 3 positions at the 2010 Asian Games
- Venue: Aoti Shooting Range
- Dates: 18 November 2010
- Competitors: 41 from 16 nations

Medalists
gold medal	Han Jin-seop	South Korea
silver medal	Kim Jong-hyun	South Korea
bronze medal	Zhu Qinan	China

The men's 50 metre rifle three positions competition at the 2010 Asian Games in Guangzhou, China was held on 18 November at the Aoti Shooting Range.

== Schedule ==
All times are China Standard Time (UTC+08:00)

Date	Time	Event
Thursday, 18 November 2010	09:00	Qualification
Thursday, 18 November 2010	14:00	Final

== Records ==
Prior to this competition, the existing world, Asian and Games records were as follows.

Qualification
World Record	Rajmond Debevec (SLO)	1186	Munich, Germany	29 August 1992
Asian Record	He Zhaohui (CHN)	1182	Milan, Italy	25 May 2009
Games Record	Igor Pirekeýew (TKM)	1175	Busan, South Korea	7 October 2002
Final
World Record	Rajmond Debevec (SLO)	1287.9	Munich, Germany	29 August 1992
Asian Record	He Zhaohui (CHN)	1284.8	Milan, Italy	25 May 2009
Games Record	Zhang Fu (CHN)	1268.0	Doha, Qatar	7 December 2006

== Results ==
=== Qualification ===
Rank	Athlete	Prone				Standing				Kneeling				Total	Xs	S-off	Notes
Rank	Athlete	1	2	3	4	1	2	3	4	1	2	3	4	Total	Xs	S-off	Notes
1	Han Jin-seop (KOR)	98	100	99	100	93	95	96	97	96	97	98	100	1169	66		
2	Kim Jong-hyun (KOR)	100	100	99	97	97	93	93	98	98	96	97	98	1166	56		
3	Midori Yajima (JPN)	99	99	98	100	96	94	97	96	98	94	98	96	1165	50		
4	Gagan Narang (IND)	99	100	98	96	95	93	94	100	99	97	96	95	1162	49		
5	Zhu Qinan (CHN)	98	98	98	99	98	97	98	96	89	93	98	99	1161	58		
6	Igor Pirekeyev (KAZ)	100	99	97	98	94	92	95	97	96	97	100	95	1160	49		
7	Vitaliy Dovgun (KAZ)	97	97	98	99	96	96	95	97	97	98	97	93	1160	41		
8	Yuriy Yurkov (KAZ)	100	97	98	97	98	94	94	97	96	94	97	96	1158	42	51.2	
9	Li Bo (CHN)	99	100	100	99	92	96	94	95	97	94	96	96	1158	52	44.4	
10	Toshikazu Yamashita (JPN)	99	98	98	99	92	98	92	95	99	96	93	95	1154	50		
11	Lee Hyun-tae (KOR)	99	100	99	99	94	98	93	91	94	95	96	96	1154	48		
12	Cao Yifei (CHN)	98	99	97	98	96	94	94	96	97	92	94	97	1152	44		
13	Imran Hassan Khan (IND)	97	96	98	98	95	92	96	94	97	96	94	97	1150	41		
14	Abdulla Al-Ahmad (QAT)	99	97	100	99	90	95	93	91	93	96	96	98	1147	40		
15	Sanjeev Rajput (IND)	98	99	97	100	91	93	98	97	92	92	95	94	1146	43		
16	Dương Anh Quân (VIE)	99	95	97	99	96	92	93	95	95	93	93	96	1143	39		
17	Dondovyn Ganzorig (MGL)	99	99	99	98	89	89	89	94	96	95	98	96	1141	45		
18	Phạm Ngọc Thanh (VIE)	97	99	98	99	88	97	95	92	95	95	93	91	1139	39		
19	Ramjan Ali (BAN)	98	96	94	97	93	93	94	95	93	97	94	95	1139	33		
20	Sasan Shahsavari (IRI)	100	96	98	94	93	96	90	88	99	94	94	95	1137	36		
21	Vũ Thành Hưng (VIE)	96	96	95	99	92	90	96	94	92	93	98	96	1137	33		
22	Nurrahimin Abdul Halim (MAS)	95	99	100	98	94	90	93	90	94	95	94	94	1136	38		
23	Khalid Al-Anazi (KSA)	99	99	97	97	92	93	98	91	95	93	84	96	1134	43		
24	Amin Heidari (IRI)	97	98	96	98	96	86	95	92	94	95	90	97	1134	40		
25	Taufick Shahrear Khan (BAN)	97	97	96	97	89	95	93	95	94	93	94	94	1134	27		
26	Tsedevdorjiin Mönkh-Erdene (MGL)	97	96	98	96	92	95	85	92	98	94	96	94	1133	31		
27	Tevarit Majchacheep (THA)	98	98	98	99	85	95	94	90	93	93	95	94	1132	47		
28	Varavut Majchacheep (THA)	97	99	97	98	93	92	94	93	91	89	93	95	1131	30		
29	Ali Al-Muhannadi (QAT)	99	96	97	97	89	96	93	90	91	93	95	94	1130	44		
30	Hisyam Adzha (MAS)	98	99	96	98	95	92	89	91	94	92	94	91	1129	31		
31	Ruslan Ismailov (KGZ)	96	93	99	98	91	97	93	94	92	91	93	92	1129	24		
32	Abdullah Hel Baki (BAN)	96	99	95	96	90	95	90	95	92	90	90	94	1122	26		
33	Hossein Bagheri (IRI)	100	94	98	93	91	93	93	94	91	94	91	90	1122	25		
34	Boldbaataryn Bishrel (MGL)	98	97	97	96	92	96	87	92	97	92	82	95	1121	43		
35	Mangala Samarakoon (SRI)	95	97	95	96	89	92	88	92	97	95	93	90	1119	24		
36	Jayson Valdez (PHI)	93	95	96	97	96	90	97	92	94	89	89	89	1117	29		
37	Mohd Shahril Sahak (MAS)	98	98	99	99	85	92	81	91	89	94	92	95	1113	32		
38	Pongsakorn Kaewja (THA)	95	95	95	92	94	93	88	92	90	94	92	90	1110	24		
39	Faiz Al-Anazi (KSA)	95	96	96	95	88	90	90	95	89	92	91	90	1107	15		
40	Abdullah Al-Bogami (KSA)	93	98	94	98	92	90	93	88	87	87	88	90	1098	24		
41	Ali Al-Qahtani (QAT)	94	94	95	96	79	88	92	85	93	91	96	86	1089	16		

=== Final ===
Rank	Athlete	Qual.	Final											Total	S-off	Notes
Rank	Athlete	Qual.	1	2	3	4	5	6	7	8	9	10	Total	Total	S-off	Notes
1st place, gold medalist(s)	Han Jin-seop (KOR)	1169	10.2	9.9	9.4	10.4	10.4	9.6	9.7	9.8	10.6	10.0	100.0	1269.0		GR
2nd place, silver medalist(s)	Kim Jong-hyun (KOR)	1166	8.5	10.4	9.3	9.7	10.1	9.9	10.0	10.8	9.9	9.9	98.5	1264.5		
3rd place, bronze medalist(s)	Zhu Qinan (CHN)	1161	10.4	10.5	10.5	9.3	9.9	10.6	9.6	10.0	10.1	10.4	101.3	1262.3		
4	Gagan Narang (IND)	1162	10.0	10.2	9.5	10.6	10.6	9.7	10.2	8.3	10.1	10.6	99.8	1261.8		
5	Midori Yajima (JPN)	1165	8.3	8.1	9.6	9.6	10.3	9.6	10.4	9.7	8.5	10.4	94.5	1259.5		
6	Yuriy Yurkov (KAZ)	1158	9.8	10.0	9.2	9.8	10.3	9.7	9.5	10.3	10.0	9.4	98.0	1256.0		
7	Vitaliy Dovgun (KAZ)	1160	9.4	8.8	8.7	9.6	10.1	9.4	9.0	10.0	10.0	10.3	95.3	1255.3		
8	Igor Pirekeyev (KAZ)	1160	8.1	9.2	9.2	8.4	10.2	10.4	10.4	10.4	8.1	10.6	95.0	1255.0		
