= Shooting at the 2014 Asian Games – Men's 10 metre air rifle team =

Men's 10 metre air rifle team at the 2014 Asian Games
- Venue: Ongnyeon International Shooting Range
- Dates: 23 September 2014
- Competitors: 45 from 15 nations

Medalists
gold medal	China; Cao Yifei, Liu Tianyou, Yang Haoran
silver medal	South Korea; Han Jin-seop, Kim Hyeon-jun, Kim Sang-do
bronze medal	India; Abhinav Bindra, Ravi Kumar, Sanjeev Rajput

The men's 10 metre air rifle team competition at the 2014 Asian Games in Incheon, South Korea was held on 23 September at the Ongnyeon International Shooting Range.

== Schedule ==
All times are Korea Standard Time (UTC+09:00)

Date	Time	Event
Tuesday, 23 September 2014	09:00	Final

== Records ==
Prior to this competition, the existing world, Asian and Games records were as follows.

World Record	China	1886.5	Granada, Spain	8 September 2014
Asian Record	China	1886.5	Granada, Spain	8 September 2014
Games Record	—	—	—	—

== Results ==
Rank	Team	Series						Total	Notes
Rank	Team	1	2	3	4	5	6	Total	Notes
1st place, gold medalist(s)	China (CHN)	313.8	314.7	315.6	314.0	312.9	315.4	1886.4	GR
	Cao Yifei	104.9	104.9	105.8	104.6	105.5	105.0	630.7	
	Liu Tianyou	103.7	104.4	104.1	105.2	104.1	105.0	626.5	
	Yang Haoran	105.2	105.4	105.7	104.2	103.3	105.4	629.2	
2nd place, silver medalist(s)	South Korea (KOR)	309.2	316.1	309.5	312.8	309.4	310.6	1867.6	
	Han Jin-seop	103.8	105.5	102.7	104.5	101.7	101.0	619.2	
	Kim Hyeon-jun	101.7	105.1	102.7	103.2	104.3	105.3	622.3	
	Kim Sang-do	103.7	105.5	104.1	105.1	103.4	104.3	626.1	
3rd place, bronze medalist(s)	India (IND)	308.6	313.7	310.2	308.5	311.7	310.3	1863.0	
	Abhinav Bindra	102.6	105.3	104.5	104.1	105.7	103.2	625.4	
	Ravi Kumar	104.1	102.8	102.6	102.2	104.5	102.7	618.9	
	Sanjeev Rajput	101.9	105.6	103.1	102.2	101.5	104.4	618.7	
4	Iran (IRI)	310.7	307.4	311.1	309.1	312.8	309.7	1860.8	
	Hossein Bagheri	101.4	101.9	105.6	103.1	104.3	102.7	619.0	
	Mehdi Jafari Pouya	104.0	103.1	101.5	102.8	104.6	102.9	618.9	
	Pouria Norouzian	105.3	102.4	104.0	103.2	103.9	104.1	622.9	
5	Japan (JPN)	310.4	308.9	308.6	309.0	309.6	304.5	1851.0	
	Takayuki Matsumoto	104.3	102.9	104.9	102.7	102.7	102.7	620.2	
	Midori Yajima	102.3	102.3	101.5	102.0	102.8	99.2	610.1	
	Toshikazu Yamashita	103.8	103.7	102.2	104.3	104.1	102.6	620.7	
6	Mongolia (MGL)	308.7	305.6	310.2	309.9	307.5	308.9	1850.8	
	Nyantain Bayaraa	104.3	102.6	103.8	104.3	103.2	103.9	622.1	
	Boldbaataryn Bishrel	100.3	100.2	103.6	102.4	103.5	103.9	613.9	
	Dondovyn Ganzorig	104.1	102.8	102.8	103.2	100.8	101.1	614.8	
7	Kazakhstan (KAZ)	304.4	311.3	307.3	310.2	306.9	305.1	1845.2	
	Ratmir Mindiyarov	100.3	104.1	101.4	103.4	100.5	100.1	609.8	
	Igor Pirekeyev	100.2	104.1	103.4	104.1	101.4	102.6	615.8	
	Yuriy Yurkov	103.9	103.1	102.5	102.7	105.0	102.4	619.6	
8	Thailand (THA)	307.9	306.4	309.2	306.1	304.6	308.9	1843.1	
	Varavut Majchacheep	102.5	101.5	102.3	101.2	99.0	101.6	608.1	
	Pongsaton Panyatong	103.0	103.9	104.1	101.0	103.3	104.4	619.7	
	Apichakli Ponglaokham	102.4	101.0	102.8	103.9	102.3	102.9	615.3	
9	Uzbekistan (UZB)	305.0	304.4	311.1	308.4	305.1	307.1	1841.1	
	Pavel Savinich	99.5	99.1	103.9	99.7	99.9	100.8	602.9	
	Saidkhon Sayfuddinov	101.3	101.7	102.9	103.1	102.0	101.9	612.9	
	Vadim Skorovarov	104.2	103.6	104.3	105.6	103.2	104.4	625.3	
10	Bangladesh (BAN)	306.1	307.9	302.8	308.1	307.0	308.0	1839.9	
	Abdullah Hel Baki	102.5	104.5	101.5	102.9	105.0	103.2	619.6	
	Mahmodul Hasan	101.3	102.6	98.8	102.4	99.8	101.6	606.5	
	Md Zesimuzzaman	102.3	100.8	102.5	102.8	102.2	103.2	613.8	
11	Singapore (SIN)	303.8	306.2	304.3	306.1	309.2	309.0	1838.6	
	Keith Chan	98.3	101.3	100.3	102.3	103.8	100.5	606.5	
	Ong Jun Hong	103.7	102.7	101.3	101.5	102.8	105.0	617.0	
	Sean Tay	101.8	102.2	102.7	102.3	102.6	103.5	615.1	
12	Saudi Arabia (KSA)	301.8	304.7	302.5	308.8	305.7	311.8	1835.3	
	Faiz Al-Anazi	100.3	102.0	100.5	104.3	102.7	104.0	613.8	
	Khalid Al-Anazi	100.7	99.9	100.3	102.4	101.8	103.5	608.6	
	Hussain Al-Harbi	100.8	102.8	101.7	102.1	101.2	104.3	612.9	
13	Qatar (QAT)	305.7	305.8	302.4	305.8	306.0	305.1	1830.8	
	Ali Al-Muhannadi	102.0	102.8	102.3	101.4	103.4	101.7	613.6	
	Mohammed Al-Sunaidi	100.2	98.3	98.1	102.1	100.9	99.7	599.3	
	Vyacheslav Skoromnov	103.5	104.7	102.0	102.3	101.7	103.7	617.9	
14	Malaysia (MAS)	300.7	308.8	304.2	301.0	307.7	301.6	1824.0	
	Mohd Hadafi Jaafar	98.4	103.5	101.5	98.1	103.2	99.2	603.9	
	Ezuan Nasir Khan	103.2	103.4	101.9	102.8	103.0	102.3	616.6	
	Mohd Zubair Mohammad	99.1	101.9	100.8	100.1	101.5	100.1	603.5	
15	Tajikistan (TJK)	297.3	301.7	306.4	301.7	304.3	302.8	1814.2	
	Daler Erov	101.8	101.5	101.3	102.6	103.0	103.4	613.6	
	Umed Usmanov	97.6	97.9	102.5	98.2	100.0	102.5	598.7	
	Todzhiddin Valiev	97.9	102.3	102.6	100.9	101.3	96.9	601.9	
