= Shooting at the 2010 Asian Games – Men's 10 metre air rifle =

Men's 10 metre air rifle at the 2010 Asian Games
- Venue: Aoti Shooting Range
- Dates: 13 November 2010
- Competitors: 50 from 21 nations

Medalists
gold medal	Zhu Qinan	China
silver medal	Gagan Narang	India
bronze medal	Kim Ki-won	South Korea

The men's 10 metre air rifle competition at the 2010 Asian Games in Guangzhou, China was held on 13 November at the Aoti Shooting Range.

== Schedule ==
All times are China Standard Time (UTC+08:00)

Date	Time	Event
Saturday, 13 November 2010	11:30	Qualification
Saturday, 13 November 2010	14:30	Final

== Records ==
Prior to this competition, the existing world, Asian and Games records were as follows.

Qualification
World Record	Tevarit Majchacheep (THA)	600	Langkawi, Malaysia	27 January 2000
Asian Record	Tevarit Majchacheep (THA)	600	Langkawi, Malaysia	27 January 2000
Games Record	Liu Tianyou (CHN)	598	Doha, Qatar	2 December 2006
Final
World Record	Gagan Narang (IND)	703.6	New Delhi, India	6 October 2010
Asian Record	Gagan Narang (IND)	703.6	New Delhi, India	6 October 2010
Games Record	Li Jie (CHN)	700.8	Busan, South Korea	2 October 2002

== Results ==
Legend

- DNS — Did not start

=== Qualification ===
Rank	Athlete	Series						Total	Xs	S-off	Notes
Rank	Athlete	1	2	3	4	5	6	Total	Xs	S-off	Notes
1	Zhu Qinan (CHN)	100	100	98	100	100	100	598	56		
2	Gagan Narang (IND)	99	98	100	100	100	100	597	47		
3	Kim Ki-won (KOR)	99	98	100	100	99	100	596	51		
4	Yu Jikang (CHN)	100	99	98	99	99	100	595	42		
5	Boldbaataryn Bishrel (MGL)	100	98	100	98	99	99	594	44		
6	Kim Jong-hyun (KOR)	100	98	99	99	98	99	593	50	52.4	
7	Ruslan Ismailov (KGZ)	98	100	99	99	99	98	593	44	52.0	
8	Toshikazu Yamashita (JPN)	99	99	99	98	100	98	593	40	51.9	
9	Sanjeev Rajput (IND)	98	98	99	100	99	99	593	48	51.8	
10	Abhinav Bindra (IND)	100	99	99	100	97	98	593	47	50.6	
11	Ong Jun Hong (SIN)	98	99	98	98	99	99	591	46		
12	Saber Parasti (IRI)	99	97	100	97	100	98	591	46		
13	Choi Sung-soon (KOR)	99	98	97	100	100	97	591	46		
14	Cao Yifei (CHN)	100	99	98	100	96	98	591	45		
15	Dondovyn Ganzorig (MGL)	100	97	99	100	99	96	591	36		
16	Varavut Majchacheep (THA)	99	97	98	99	99	97	589	41		
17	Mehdi Jafari Pouya (IRI)	100	98	100	97	96	98	589	39		
18	Igor Pirekeyev (KAZ)	97	98	97	97	100	99	588	37		
19	Midori Yajima (JPN)	97	98	97	99	96	100	587	38		
20	Tsedevdorjiin Mönkh-Erdene (MGL)	98	97	97	99	98	97	586	41		
21	Yuriy Yurkov (KAZ)	97	96	100	95	99	99	586	40		
22	Asif Hossain Khan (BAN)	97	99	98	98	97	96	585	39		
23	Abdullah Hel Baki (BAN)	99	98	98	96	97	97	585	37		
24	Jayson Valdez (PHI)	97	99	96	99	97	97	585	36		
25	Zhang Jin (SIN)	95	99	99	97	98	97	585	34		
26	Jonathan Koh (SIN)	98	100	96	95	98	98	585	33		
27	Arzybek Makhmadov (KGZ)	96	98	99	97	97	97	584	35		
28	Ali Al-Haiderabadi (BRN)	96	95	99	94	100	98	582	37		
29	Hossein Bagheri (IRI)	96	97	98	96	97	97	581	34		
30	Ali Al-Muhannadi (QAT)	96	96	97	98	97	97	581	32		
31	Abdullah Al-Harbi (IOC)	100	97	95	97	95	97	581	32		
32	Phạm Ngọc Thanh (VIE)	99	98	99	95	94	96	581	32		
33	Taufick Shahrear Khan (BAN)	99	94	98	96	96	98	581	29		
34	Abdulla Al-Ahmad (QAT)	98	99	95	97	96	96	581	28		
35	Mohd Shahril Sahak (MAS)	95	95	98	100	96	96	580	28		
36	Nurrahimin Abdul Halim (MAS)	96	94	95	99	99	96	579	31		
37	Dương Anh Quân (VIE)	98	94	98	97	97	95	579	31		
38	Mangala Samarakoon (SRI)	99	97	96	98	94	95	579	29		
39	Worawat Suriyajun (THA)	97	97	95	93	99	97	578	32		
40	Nuttakorn Tongwon (THA)	97	93	98	98	95	97	578	29		
41	Vitaliy Dovgun (KAZ)	98	93	94	96	96	100	577	35		
42	Nasser Al-Harthi (KSA)	96	96	95	98	95	96	576	29		
43	Faiz Al-Anazi (KSA)	94	96	93	97	98	96	574	25		
44	Askat Tokmokov (KGZ)	93	93	96	95	98	95	570	28		
45	Chanas Rai (NEP)	97	94	96	93	96	94	570	24		
46	Vũ Thành Hưng (VIE)	93	97	95	95	93	96	569	25		
47	Faisal Al-Saad (KSA)	95	90	95	97	94	94	565	24		
48	Karimkhon Boboev (TJK)	90	92	92	92	92	94	552	13		
—	Hisyam Adzha (MAS)							DNS			
—	Abdulla Al-Madeed (QAT)							DNS			

=== Final ===
Rank	Athlete	Qual.	Final											Total	S-off	Notes
Rank	Athlete	Qual.	1	2	3	4	5	6	7	8	9	10	Total	Total	S-off	Notes
1st place, gold medalist(s)	Zhu Qinan (CHN)	598	10.4	10.7	9.8	10.2	10.2	10.3	10.6	10.7	10.7	10.4	104.0	702.0		GR
2nd place, silver medalist(s)	Gagan Narang (IND)	597	10.8	10.4	10.0	10.3	10.5	10.8	10.4	10.5	10.3	9.7	103.7	700.7		
3rd place, bronze medalist(s)	Kim Ki-won (KOR)	596	9.4	10.6	10.6	10.4	10.6	10.6	10.4	10.5	10.8	10.1	104.0	700.0		
4	Boldbaataryn Bishrel (MGL)	594	10.4	10.6	10.8	9.6	10.5	9.8	10.5	10.8	10.0	10.0	103.0	697.0		
5	Kim Jong-hyun (KOR)	593	10.4	10.0	10.6	9.8	10.6	10.5	10.8	10.2	10.5	10.5	103.9	696.9		
6	Yu Jikang (CHN)	595	9.9	10.7	10.2	9.9	10.0	10.1	9.5	9.9	10.6	10.9	101.7	696.7		
7	Ruslan Ismailov (KGZ)	593	10.4	9.8	9.6	10.1	9.9	10.3	10.3	10.2	10.6	10.5	101.7	694.7		
8	Toshikazu Yamashita (JPN)	593	10.3	10.1	10.8	10.0	9.2	10.2	9.5	9.7	10.7	10.4	100.9	693.9		
