= Shooting at the 2014 Asian Games – Men's 50 metre rifle three positions team =

Men's 50 metre rifle 3 positions team at the 2014 Asian Games
- Venue: Ongnyeon International Shooting Range
- Dates: 27 September 2014
- Competitors: 36 from 12 nations

Medalists
gold medal	China; Cao Yifei, Kang Hongwei, Zhu Qinan
silver medal	South Korea; Han Jin-seop, Kim Jong-hyun, Kwon Jun-cheol
bronze medal	Japan; Takayuki Matsumoto, Midori Yajima, Toshikazu Yamashita

The men's 50 metre rifle three positions team competition at the 2014 Asian Games in Incheon, South Korea was held on 27 September at the Ongnyeon International Shooting Range.

The men's 50 metre rifle three positions consists of the prone, standing and kneeling positions, fired in that order, with 3×40 shots for men's competition.

The men's match has separate commands and times for each position, giving each shooter 45 minutes to complete the prone part, 75 minutes for the standing part, and 60 minutes for the kneeling part, including sighting shots for each part of the competition in this rifle three positions event.

The top eight competitors reach the final, where the score zones are divided into tenths, giving up to 10.9 points for each shot but qualification results are counted for the team event.

Twelve teams participated in this event. China won the Asian Games team title of this men's 50m rifle three positions event. The Chinese trio of Cao Yifei, Kang Hongwei and Zhu Qinan, collected a combined total of 3502 points. South Korea finished second to win the silver medal and Japan won the bronze medal after finishing in third position. India and Kazakhstan finished in 4th and 5th positions in order.

== Schedule ==
All times are Korea Standard Time (UTC+09:00)

Date	Time	Event
Saturday, 27 September 2014	09:00	Final

== Records ==
Prior to this competition, the existing world, Asian and Games records were as follows.

World Record	China	3529	Tehran, Iran	25 October 2013
Asian Record	China	3529	Tehran, Iran	25 October 2013
Games Record	—	—	—	—

== Results ==
Rank	Team	Kneeling				Prone				Standing				Total	Xs	Notes
Rank	Team	1	2	3	4	1	2	3	4	1	2	3	4	Total	Xs	Notes
1st place, gold medalist(s)	China (CHN)	289	292	288	292	297	297	297	296	293	287	290	284	3502	179	GR
	Cao Yifei	98	97	96	96	98	99	99	98	99	94	97	95	1166	61	
	Kang Hongwei	95	98	96	98	99	98	100	98	97	97	96	93	1165	56	
	Zhu Qinan	96	97	96	98	100	100	98	100	97	96	97	96	1171	62	
2nd place, silver medalist(s)	South Korea (KOR)	291	292	291	294	297	299	297	299	276	285	284	279	3484	178	
	Han Jin-seop	97	97	98	98	98	100	98	100	96	94	97	93	1166	58	
	Kim Jong-hyun	99	100	99	100	100	99	100	100	90	94	96	93	1170	71	
	Kwon Jun-cheol	95	95	94	96	99	100	99	99	90	97	91	93	1148	49	
3rd place, bronze medalist(s)	Japan (JPN)	293	292	287	295	291	295	294	297	285	288	284	280	3481	152	
	Takayuki Matsumoto	97	98	95	99	96	97	97	97	96	97	94	91	1154	42	
	Midori Yajima	98	96	95	100	96	100	99	100	93	95	94	94	1160	55	
	Toshikazu Yamashita	98	98	97	96	99	98	98	100	96	96	96	95	1167	55	
4	India (IND)	288	290	288	287	296	296	297	296	289	285	283	285	3480	135	
	Gagan Narang	96	97	99	94	99	99	98	99	98	92	93	93	1157	46	
	Sanjeev Rajput	95	96	93	98	100	98	100	97	94	95	95	98	1159	38	
	Chain Singh	97	97	96	95	97	99	99	100	97	98	95	94	1164	51	
5	Kazakhstan (KAZ)	289	285	291	286	297	299	292	298	279	288	285	285	3474	149	
	Ratmir Mindiyarov	95	92	97	94	100	100	95	99	92	97	92	98	1151	45	
	Igor Pirekeyev	97	96	98	96	99	100	98	100	92	95	96	95	1162	53	
	Yuriy Yurkov	97	97	96	96	98	99	99	99	95	96	97	92	1161	51	
6	Mongolia (MGL)	277	286	292	288	291	293	297	295	279	282	283	282	3445	135	
	Nyantain Bayaraa	95	93	98	96	98	98	99	100	94	95	97	96	1159	50	
	Boldbaataryn Bishrel	92	95	99	95	97	96	98	96	95	95	93	93	1144	43	
	Olzodyn Enkhsaikhan	90	98	95	97	96	99	100	99	90	92	93	93	1142	42	
7	Iran (IRI)	281	287	292	289	292	292	294	290	277	281	272	281	3428	107	
	Hossein Bagheri	93	94	95	97	96	96	99	97	89	95	90	95	1136	30	
	Mehdi Jafari Pouya	93	96	99	96	99	99	96	98	94	93	91	92	1146	33	
	Sasan Shahsavari	95	97	98	96	97	97	99	95	94	93	91	94	1146	44	
8	Thailand (THA)	282	287	283	285	296	291	290	296	285	275	278	279	3427	120	
	Tevarit Majchacheep	93	98	90	96	98	99	96	100	94	88	87	91	1130	38	
	Varavut Majchacheep	93	96	97	91	99	95	97	97	94	95	96	91	1141	32	
	Napis Tortungpanich	96	93	96	98	99	97	97	99	97	92	95	97	1156	50	
9	Vietnam (VIE)	274	288	288	289	295	293	291	289	279	278	277	274	3415	136	
	Dương Anh Quân	87	95	96	96	96	97	93	95	94	87	91	88	1115	39	
	Nguyễn Duy Hoàng	94	97	94	96	99	98	99	96	94	96	96	98	1157	49	
	Phùng Lê Huyên	93	96	98	97	100	98	99	98	91	95	90	88	1143	48	
10	Qatar (QAT)	281	282	291	287	293	294	294	292	281	271	273	276	3415	114	
	Ali Al-Muhannadi	94	94	93	97	98	98	98	96	94	91	94	93	1140	39	
	Mohammed Al-Sunaidi	90	91	99	94	96	98	97	99	91	87	87	89	1118	26	
	Vyacheslav Skoromnov	97	97	99	96	99	98	99	97	96	93	92	94	1157	49	
11	Saudi Arabia (KSA)	281	283	283	281	291	294	291	291	282	282	270	281	3410	118	
	Faiz Al-Anazi	96	95	97	95	98	97	94	96	95	97	93	94	1147	44	
	Khalid Al-Anazi	92	94	94	95	98	98	98	98	94	93	92	94	1140	38	
	Hussain Al-Harbi	93	94	92	91	95	99	99	97	93	92	85	93	1123	36	
12	Malaysia (MAS)	279	286	277	283	295	292	290	291	273	281	274	269	3390	108	
	Mohd Hadafi Jaafar	92	96	96	92	97	97	97	96	93	94	89	91	1130	33	
	Ezuan Nasir Khan	91	96	90	92	99	99	97	99	89	94	91	85	1122	37	
	Mohd Zubair Mohammad	96	94	91	99	99	96	96	96	91	93	94	93	1138	38	
