= Shooting at the 2010 Asian Games – Men's 50 metre rifle three positions team =

Men's 50 metre rifle 3 positions team at the 2010 Asian Games
- Venue: Aoti Shooting Range
- Dates: 18 November 2010
- Competitors: 36 from 12 nations

Medalists
gold medal	South Korea; Han Jin-seop, Kim Jong-hyun, Lee Hyun-tae
silver medal	Kazakhstan; Vitaliy Dovgun, Igor Pirekeyev, Yuriy Yurkov
bronze medal	China; Cao Yifei, Li Bo, Zhu Qinan

The men's 50 metre rifle three positions team competition at the 2010 Asian Games in Guangzhou, China was held on 18 November at the Aoti Shooting Range.

The men's 50 metre rifle three positions consists of the prone, standing and kneeling positions, fired in that order, with 3×40 shots for men.

The men's match has separate commands and times for each position, giving each shooter 45 minutes to complete the prone part, 75 minutes for the standing part, and 60 minutes for the kneeling part, including sighting shots for each part.

The top eight competitors reach the final, where the score zones are divided into tenths, giving up to 10.9 points for each shot. The men's final consists of ten shots from the standing position, with a time limit of 75 seconds per shot. The competition is won by the shooter who reaches the highest aggregate score (qualification + final, maximum 1309.0).

South Korea won the Asian Games team title of this men's 50m rifle three positions event. The Korean trio of Han Jin-seop, Kim Jong-hyun and Lee Hyun-tae, collected a combined total of 3489 points, Kazakhstan finished second and won the silver medal, while China finished third.

== Schedule ==
All times are China Standard Time (UTC+08:00)

Date	Time	Event
Thursday, 18 November 2010	09:00	Final

== Records ==
Prior to this competition, the existing world, Asian and Games records were as follows.

World Record	Austria	3508	Plzeň, Czech Republic	21 July 2003
Asian Record	China	3494	Doha, Qatar	7 December 2006
Games Record	China	3494	Doha, Qatar	7 December 2006

== Results ==
Rank	Team	Prone				Standing				Kneeling				Total	Xs	Notes
Rank	Team	1	2	3	4	1	2	3	4	1	2	3	4	Total	Xs	Notes
1st place, gold medalist(s)	South Korea (KOR)	297	300	297	296	282	286	284	286	288	288	291	294	3489	170	
	Han Jin-seop	98	100	99	100	93	95	96	97	96	97	98	100	1169	66	
	Kim Jong-hyun	100	100	99	97	97	93	93	98	98	96	97	98	1166	56	
	Lee Hyun-tae	99	100	99	99	94	98	93	91	94	95	96	96	1154	48	
2nd place, silver medalist(s)	Kazakhstan (KAZ)	297	293	293	294	284	291	288	282	289	289	294	284	3478	132	
	Vitaliy Dovgun	97	97	98	99	96	96	95	97	97	98	97	93	1160	41	
	Igor Pirekeyev	100	99	97	98	94	92	95	97	96	97	100	95	1160	49	
	Yuriy Yurkov	100	97	98	97	98	94	94	97	96	94	97	96	1158	42	
3rd place, bronze medalist(s)	China (CHN)	295	297	295	296	286	287	286	287	283	279	288	292	3471	154	
	Cao Yifei	98	99	97	98	96	94	94	96	97	92	94	97	1152	44	
	Li Bo	99	100	100	99	92	96	94	95	97	94	96	96	1158	52	
	Zhu Qinan	98	98	98	99	98	97	98	96	89	93	98	99	1161	58	
4	India (IND)	294	295	293	294	288	291	281	278	288	285	285	286	3458	133	
	Imran Hassan Khan	97	96	98	98	95	92	96	94	97	96	94	97	1150	41	
	Gagan Narang	99	100	98	96	95	93	94	100	99	97	96	95	1162	49	
	Sanjeev Rajput	98	99	97	100	91	93	98	97	92	92	95	94	1146	43	
5	Vietnam (VIE)	292	290	290	297	284	281	276	279	282	281	284	283	3419	111	
	Dương Anh Quân	99	95	97	99	96	92	93	95	95	93	93	96	1143	39	
	Phạm Ngọc Thanh	97	99	98	99	88	97	95	92	95	95	93	91	1139	39	
	Vũ Thành Hưng	96	96	95	99	92	90	96	94	92	93	98	96	1137	33	
6	Mongolia (MGL)	294	292	294	290	261	278	273	280	291	281	276	285	3395	119	
	Boldbaataryn Bishrel	98	97	97	96	92	96	87	92	97	92	82	95	1121	43	
	Dondovyn Ganzorig	99	99	99	98	89	89	89	94	96	95	98	96	1141	45	
	Tsedevdorjiin Mönkh-Erdene	97	96	98	96	92	95	85	92	98	94	96	94	1133	31	
7	Bangladesh (BAN)	291	292	285	290	277	285	272	283	279	280	278	283	3395	86	
	Ramjan Ali	98	96	94	97	93	93	94	95	93	97	94	95	1139	33	
	Abdullah Hel Baki	96	99	95	96	90	95	90	95	92	90	90	94	1122	26	
	Taufick Shahrear Khan	97	97	96	97	89	95	93	95	94	93	94	94	1134	27	
8	Iran (IRI)	297	288	292	285	278	274	280	275	284	283	275	282	3393	101	
	Hossein Bagheri	100	94	98	93	91	93	93	94	91	94	91	90	1122	25	
	Amin Heidari	97	98	96	98	96	86	95	92	94	95	90	97	1134	40	
	Sasan Shahsavari	100	96	98	94	93	96	90	88	99	94	94	95	1137	36	
9	Malaysia (MAS)	291	296	295	295	263	272	274	274	277	281	280	280	3378	101	
	Nurrahimin Abdul Halim	95	99	100	98	94	90	93	90	94	95	94	94	1136	38	
	Hisyam Adzha	98	99	96	98	95	92	89	91	94	92	94	91	1129	31	
	Mohd Shahril Sahak	98	98	99	99	85	92	81	91	89	94	92	95	1113	32	
10	Thailand (THA)	290	292	290	289	272	280	276	275	274	276	280	279	3373	101	
	Pongsakorn Kaewja	95	95	95	92	94	93	88	92	90	94	92	90	1110	24	
	Tevarit Majchacheep	98	98	98	99	85	95	94	90	93	93	95	94	1132	47	
	Varavut Majchacheep	97	99	97	98	93	92	94	93	91	89	93	95	1131	30	
11	Qatar (QAT)	292	287	292	292	258	279	278	266	277	280	287	278	3366	100	
	Abdulla Al-Ahmad	99	97	100	99	90	95	93	91	93	96	96	98	1147	40	
	Ali Al-Muhannadi	99	96	97	97	89	96	93	90	91	93	95	94	1130	44	
	Ali Al-Qahtani	94	94	95	96	79	88	92	85	93	91	96	86	1089	16	
12	Saudi Arabia (KSA)	287	293	287	290	281	274	272	273	271	272	263	276	3339	82	
	Faiz Al-Anazi	95	96	96	95	88	90	90	95	89	92	91	90	1107	15	
	Khalid Al-Anazi	99	99	97	97	92	93	98	91	95	93	84	96	1134	43	
	Abdullah Al-Bogami	93	98	94	98	92	90	93	88	87	87	88	90	1098	24	
