= Shooting at the 2022 Asian Games – Men's 50 metre rifle three positions =

Men's 50 metre rifle 3 positions at the 2022 Asian Games
- Venue: Fuyang Yinhu Sports Centre
- Dates: 29 September 2023
- Competitors: 46 from 17 nations

Medalists
| gold medal | Du Linshu | China |
| silver medal | Aishwary Pratap Singh Tomar | India |
| bronze medal | Tian Jiaming | China |

The men's 50 metre rifle three positions competition at the 2022 Asian Games in Hangzhou, China was held on 29 September 2023 at Fuyang Yinhu Sports Centre.

== Schedule ==
All times are China Standard Time (UTC+08:00)

| Date | Time | Event |
|---|---|---|
| Friday, 29 September 2023 | 09:00 | Qualification |
| Friday, 29 September 2023 | 14:00 | Final |

== Records ==
Prior to this competition, the existing world, Asian and Games records were as follows.

Qualification
| World Record | Jan Lochbihler (SUI) | 596 | Cairo, Egypt | 3 March 2022 |
| Asian Record | Liu Yukun (CHN) | 596 | Cairo, Egypt | 22 October 2022 |
| Games Record | — | — | — | — |
Final
| World Record | Jiří Přívratský (CZE) | 466.1 | Baku, Azerbaijan | 13 May 2023 |
| Asian Record | Zhang Changhong (CHN) | 466.0 | Tokyo, Japan | 2 August 2021 |
| Games Record | Cao Yifei (CHN) | 455.5 | Incheon, South Korea | 27 September 2014 |

== Results ==
Legend

- DNS — Did not start

=== Qualification ===
| Rank | Athlete | Kneeling | | Prone | | Standing | | Total | Xs | Notes |
| Rank | Athlete | 1 | 2 | 1 | 2 | 1 | 2 | Total | Xs | Notes |
|---|---|---|---|---|---|---|---|---|---|---|
| 1 | Swapnil Kusale (IND) | 98 | 98 | 100 | 99 | 99 | 97 | 591 | 33 | GR |
| 2 | Aishwary Pratap Singh Tomar (IND) | 99 | 100 | 98 | 99 | 98 | 97 | 591 | 27 | GR |
| 3 | Du Linshu (CHN) | 98 | 100 | 100 | 99 | 96 | 97 | 590 | 34 | |
| 4 | Tian Jiaming (CHN) | 97 | 98 | 99 | 100 | 99 | 96 | 589 | 40 | |
| 5 | Akhil Sheoran (IND) | 95 | 99 | 98 | 99 | 98 | 98 | 587 | 30 | |
| 6 | Kim Jong-hyun (KOR) | 98 | 98 | 98 | 99 | 97 | 97 | 587 | 27 | |
| 7 | Kim Sang-do (KOR) | 97 | 99 | 98 | 99 | 97 | 95 | 585 | 28 | |
| 8 | Pouria Norouzian (IRI) | 99 | 96 | 100 | 98 | 94 | 97 | 584 | 32 | |
| 9 | Yu Hao (CHN) | 95 | 98 | 100 | 100 | 96 | 95 | 584 | 30 | |
| 10 | Konstantin Malinovskiy (KAZ) | 97 | 98 | 98 | 98 | 98 | 95 | 584 | 28 | |
| 11 | Napis Tortungpanich (THA) | 97 | 96 | 98 | 100 | 94 | 98 | 583 | 28 | |
| 12 | Mahyar Sedaghat (IRI) | 97 | 97 | 100 | 97 | 94 | 97 | 582 | 20 | |
| 13 | Nyantain Bayaraa (MGL) | 98 | 91 | 99 | 100 | 97 | 96 | 581 | 30 | |
| 14 | Yuriy Yurkov (KAZ) | 100 | 97 | 99 | 98 | 94 | 93 | 581 | 25 | |
| 15 | Masaya Endo (JPN) | 96 | 94 | 100 | 97 | 96 | 97 | 580 | 31 | |
| 16 | Islam Satpayev (KAZ) | 93 | 100 | 99 | 100 | 94 | 94 | 580 | 29 | |
| 17 | Davin Rosyiid Wibowo (INA) | 97 | 97 | 100 | 100 | 89 | 95 | 578 | 20 | |
| 18 | Thongphaphum Vongsukdee (THA) | 97 | 92 | 97 | 98 | 97 | 96 | 577 | 23 | |
| 19 | Mo Dai-seong (KOR) | 95 | 97 | 97 | 98 | 94 | 95 | 576 | 28 | |
| 20 | Batbayaryn Erkhembayar (MGL) | 95 | 97 | 98 | 100 | 93 | 93 | 576 | 21 | |
| 21 | Aqib Latif (PAK) | 98 | 96 | 97 | 98 | 92 | 95 | 576 | 20 | |
| 22 | Ghufran Adil (PAK) | 96 | 96 | 99 | 98 | 93 | 94 | 576 | 18 | |
| 23 | Haritz Iklil Hessly Hafiz (MAS) | 92 | 95 | 99 | 99 | 94 | 96 | 575 | 24 | |
| 24 | Atsushi Shimada (JPN) | 96 | 95 | 96 | 100 | 95 | 93 | 575 | 21 | |
| 25 | Amir Mohammad Nekounam (IRI) | 91 | 94 | 97 | 98 | 99 | 95 | 574 | 26 | |
| 26 | Fathur Gustafian (INA) | 94 | 95 | 97 | 96 | 97 | 95 | 574 | 25 | |
| 27 | Hamed Al-Khatri (OMA) | 96 | 98 | 99 | 97 | 91 | 93 | 574 | 25 | |
| 28 | Issam Al-Balushi (OMA) | 94 | 96 | 97 | 98 | 95 | 94 | 574 | 24 | |
| 29 | Ali Al-Muhannadi (QAT) | 96 | 95 | 99 | 100 | 91 | 93 | 574 | 22 | |
| 30 | Mahmood Haji (BRN) | 95 | 97 | 99 | 98 | 94 | 90 | 573 | 16 | |
| 31 | Khaled Mohamed Al-Doseri (BRN) | 92 | 94 | 96 | 95 | 99 | 96 | 572 | 25 | |
| 32 | Trisnarmanto (INA) | 95 | 95 | 96 | 100 | 94 | 91 | 571 | 23 | |
| 33 | Khaled Al-Majed (KUW) | 95 | 98 | 97 | 100 | 90 | 91 | 571 | 23 | |
| 34 | Robiul Islam (BAN) | 93 | 96 | 96 | 97 | 94 | 95 | 571 | 17 | |
| 35 | Turki Al-Shemari (KUW) | 98 | 97 | 95 | 99 | 89 | 93 | 571 | 17 | |
| 36 | Abdullah Hel Baki (BAN) | 95 | 95 | 98 | 99 | 93 | 90 | 570 | 19 | |
| 37 | Ibrahim Al-Muqbali (OMA) | 95 | 96 | 96 | 98 | 88 | 96 | 569 | 23 | |
| 38 | Patsugree Sriwichai (THA) | 96 | 96 | 96 | 95 | 93 | 93 | 569 | 20 | |
| 39 | Akihito Shimizu (JPN) | 92 | 91 | 95 | 98 | 98 | 95 | 569 | 19 | |
| 40 | Abdullah Al-Harbi (KUW) | 95 | 95 | 96 | 97 | 90 | 93 | 566 | 14 | |
| 41 | Husain Abduljabbar (BRN) | 95 | 95 | 93 | 99 | 92 | 92 | 566 | 13 | |
| 42 | Shovon Chowdhury (BAN) | 95 | 94 | 98 | 96 | 91 | 90 | 564 | 15 | |
| 43 | Zeeshan Farid (PAK) | 89 | 97 | 95 | 96 | 94 | 92 | 563 | 19 | |
| 44 | Tsedevdorjiin Mönkh-Erdene (MGL) | 93 | 92 | 96 | 98 | 92 | 86 | 557 | 17 | |
| 45 | Jayson Valdez (PHI) | 94 | 90 | 96 | 97 | 87 | 91 | 555 | 16 | |
| — | Abdullah Al-Sunaidi (QAT) | | | | | | | DNS | | |

=== Final ===
| Rank | Athlete | Kneeling | | | Prone | | | Standing – Elimination | | | | | | | S-off | Notes |
| Rank | Athlete | 1 | 2 | 3 | 1 | 2 | 3 | 1 | 2 | 3 | 4 | 5 | 6 | 7 | S-off | Notes |
|---|---|---|---|---|---|---|---|---|---|---|---|---|---|---|---|---|
| 1st place, gold medalist(s) | Du Linshu (CHN) | 52.3 | 103.7 | 153.5 | 205.7 | 257.2 | 308.4 | 358.5 | 409.9 | 418.9 | 429.6 | 440.2 | 450.8 | 460.6 | | GR |
| 2nd place, silver medalist(s) | Aishwary Pratap Singh Tomar (IND) | 48.8 | 100.8 | 151.6 | 202.4 | 254.7 | 306.4 | 358.1 | 408.2 | 418.8 | 429.2 | 439.7 | 450.0 | 459.7 | | |
| 3rd place, bronze medalist(s) | Tian Jiaming (CHN) | 51.6 | 100.6 | 152.2 | 204.4 | 256.2 | 307.9 | 358.1 | 409.7 | 419.5 | 429.5 | 439.0 | 448.3 | | | |
| 4 | Swapnil Kusale (IND) | 51.4 | 103.6 | 152.8 | 205.0 | 257.6 | 310.8 | 361.3 | 410.7 | 418.3 | 428.8 | 438.9 | | | | |
| 5 | Konstantin Malinovskiy (KAZ) | 50.7 | 103.2 | 153.8 | 204.6 | 255.6 | 307.5 | 357.9 | 408.3 | 419.0 | 428.7 | | | | | |
| 6 | Kim Jong-hyun (KOR) | 50.5 | 101.2 | 151.6 | 204.0 | 256.7 | 305.9 | 356.4 | 406.4 | 416.8 | | | | | | |
| 7 | Kim Sang-do (KOR) | 50.7 | 100.5 | 150.4 | 200.9 | 252.0 | 303.4 | 351.6 | 402.2 | | | | | | | |
| 8 | Pouria Norouzian (IRI) | 50.0 | 101.1 | 151.8 | 201.8 | 251.6 | 302.9 | 352.0 | 402.2 | | | | | | | |
