= Shooting at the 2006 Asian Games – Men's 50 metre rifle three positions team =

Men's 50 metre rifle 3 positions team at the 2006 Asian Games
- Venue: Lusail Shooting Range
- Dates: 7 December 2006
- Competitors: 39 from 13 nations

Medalists
gold medal	China; Liu Tianyou, Zhang Fu, Zhang Lei
silver medal	Kazakhstan; Vitaliy Dovgun, Yuriy Melsitov, Yuriy Yurkov
bronze medal	India; Imran Hassan Khan, Gagan Narang, Sanjeev Rajput

The men's 50 metre rifle three positions team competition at the 2006 Asian Games in Doha, Qatar was held on 7 December at the Lusail Shooting Range.

The men's 50 metre rifle three positions consists of the prone, standing and kneeling positions, fired in that order, with 3×40 shots for men.

The men's match has separate commands and times for each position, giving each shooter 45 minutes to complete the prone part, 75 minutes for the standing part, and 60 minutes for the kneeling part, including sighting shots for each part.

The top eight competitors reach the final, where the score zones are divided into tenths, giving up to 10.9 points for each shot. The men's final consists of ten shots from the standing position, with a time limit of 75 seconds per shot. The competition is won by the shooter who reaches the highest aggregate score (qualification + final, maximum 1309.0).

China defended the Asian Games team title of this men's 50m rifle three positions event with an Asian record at the Lusail Shooting Complex. The Chinese trio of Zhang Lei, Zhang Fu and Liu Tianyou, collected a combined total of 3494 points, surpassing the previous Asian mark of 3477 points set by their compatriots in the Asian Shooting Championships in Kuala Lumpur, Malaysia in 2004.

It was China's third consecutive time to win the Asian Games team title of this event. Kazakhstan team of Vitaliy Dovgun, Yuriy Melsitov and Yuriy Yurkov finished second with a total of 3457 points, one point ahead of the third-placed Indian team of Imran Hassan Khan, Gagan Narang and Sanjeev Rajput.

== Schedule ==
All times are Arabia Standard Time (UTC+03:00)

Date	Time	Event
Thursday, 7 December 2006	08:00	Final

== Records ==
Prior to this competition, the existing world, Asian and Games records were as follows.

World Record	Austria	3508	Plzeň, Czech Republic	21 July 2003
Asian Record	China	3477	Kuala Lumpur, Malaysia	13 February 2004
Games Record	China	3472	Busan, South Korea	7 October 2002

== Results ==
Rank	Team	Prone				Standing				Kneeling				Total	Notes
Rank	Team	1	2	3	4	1	2	3	4	1	2	3	4	Total	Notes
1st place, gold medalist(s)	China (CHN)	297	296	292	293	286	285	293	289	294	288	288	293	3494	AR
	Liu Tianyou	99	100	96	95	94	93	96	97	97	96	97	99	1159	
	Zhang Fu	99	97	99	100	94	96	99	96	98	100	95	97	1170	
	Zhang Lei	99	99	97	98	98	96	98	96	99	92	96	97	1165	
2nd place, silver medalist(s)	Kazakhstan (KAZ)	297	296	290	296	279	282	275	291	284	288	290	289	3457	
	Vitaliy Dovgun	99	99	95	100	96	92	95	97	95	98	96	96	1158	
	Yuriy Melsitov	99	99	99	100	89	95	88	97	95	95	98	97	1151	
	Yuriy Yurkov	99	98	96	96	94	95	92	97	94	95	96	96	1148	
3rd place, bronze medalist(s)	India (IND)	295	293	295	295	282	292	289	283	278	279	288	287	3456	
	Imran Hassan Khan	99	97	96	95	94	97	94	93	94	95	93	93	1140	
	Gagan Narang	99	98	99	100	97	99	97	98	90	91	98	96	1162	
	Sanjeev Rajput	97	98	100	100	91	96	98	92	94	93	97	98	1154	
4	South Korea (KOR)	292	293	295	290	283	283	281	282	288	284	290	278	3439	
	Jeon Dong-ju	96	97	99	94	96	93	94	93	93	94	94	93	1136	
	Lee Hyun-tae	98	97	97	100	94	96	95	95	97	93	99	94	1155	
	Park Bong-duk	98	99	99	96	93	94	92	94	98	97	97	91	1148	
5	Mongolia (MGL)	295	292	297	296	279	277	275	283	285	285	279	281	3424	
	Nergüin Enkhbaatar	98	99	98	98	89	93	91	93	95	96	91	94	1135	
	Olzodyn Enkhsaikhan	98	95	100	99	94	94	91	95	95	94	91	92	1138	
	Tsedevdorjiin Mönkh-Erdene	99	98	99	99	96	90	93	95	95	95	97	95	1151	
6	Japan (JPN)	291	296	290	289	278	286	282	283	285	279	282	281	3422	
	Tadashi Maki	99	98	99	99	93	94	92	93	92	92	94	94	1139	
	Takayuki Matsumoto	96	99	93	93	93	95	94	97	96	94	93	93	1136	
	Toshikazu Yamashita	96	99	98	97	92	97	96	93	97	93	95	94	1147	
7	Kyrgyzstan (KGZ)	294	294	292	294	274	276	277	281	283	277	285	287	3414	
	Ruslan Ismailov	99	96	97	96	95	92	93	94	95	90	98	96	1141	
	Tachir Ismailov	98	100	97	99	90	92	89	95	93	96	90	95	1134	
	Yuri Lomov	97	98	98	99	89	92	95	92	95	91	97	96	1139	
8	Thailand (THA)	293	298	297	289	272	273	282	278	280	284	283	278	3407	
	Komkrit Kongnamchok	97	99	99	97	84	90	94	91	90	93	93	90	1117	
	Tevarit Majchacheep	96	100	99	97	93	91	93	92	99	99	98	97	1154	
	Varavut Majchacheep	100	99	99	95	95	92	95	95	91	92	92	91	1136	
9	Vietnam (VIE)	293	296	294	292	268	272	276	272	275	282	283	286	3389	
	Nguyễn Tấn Nam	97	99	99	98	90	94	91	90	92	96	94	97	1137	
	Trần Văn Ngọc	97	99	97	98	85	91	92	93	89	93	93	94	1121	
	Vũ Khánh Hải	99	98	98	96	93	87	93	89	94	93	96	95	1131	
10	Pakistan (PAK)	292	294	293	291	272	278	281	276	277	272	282	279	3387	
	Muhammad Mushtaq	100	100	97	95	96	91	92	91	92	93	92	90	1129	
	Ayaz Tahir	94	96	97	98	84	94	96	92	93	87	92	96	1119	
	Siddique Umer	98	98	99	98	92	93	93	93	92	92	98	93	1139	
11	Oman (OMA)	292	292	290	291	272	266	267	268	280	284	277	281	3360	
	Dadallah Al-Bulushi	96	97	98	98	91	89	86	85	98	96	96	95	1125	
	Mohammed Al-Hanai	98	97	94	96	91	86	87	91	91	93	88	92	1104	
	Khalaf Al-Khatri	98	98	98	97	90	91	94	92	91	95	93	94	1131	
12	Qatar (QAT)	291	286	290	288	281	261	268	275	282	274	276	282	3354	
	Abdulla Al-Ahmad	97	95	95	96	95	94	93	92	97	95	96	96	1141	
	Abdulaziz Al-Jabri	96	94	96	97	97	81	86	89	91	93	91	92	1103	
	Ali Al-Qahtani	98	97	99	95	89	86	89	94	94	86	89	94	1110	
13	Saudi Arabia (KSA)	288	289	282	288	277	260	270	274	268	274	275	263	3308	
	Khalid Al-Anazi	95	98	94	98	94	90	94	95	90	90	92	91	1121	
	Abdullah Al-Bogami	97	95	95	94	96	86	87	89	92	92	94	89	1106	
	Khalid Al-Zamil	96	96	93	96	87	84	89	90	86	92	89	83	1081	
