= Shooting at the 2010 Asian Games – Men's 10 metre air rifle team =

Men's 10 metre air rifle team at the 2010 Asian Games
- Venue: Aoti Shooting Range
- Dates: 13 November 2010
- Competitors: 42 from 14 nations

Medalists
| gold medal | China; Cao Yifei, Yu Jikang, Zhu Qinan |
| silver medal | India; Abhinav Bindra, Gagan Narang, Sanjeev Rajput |
| bronze medal | South Korea; Choi Sung-soon, Kim Jong-hyun, Kim Ki-won |

The men's 10 metre air rifle team competition at the 2010 Asian Games in Guangzhou, China was held on 13 November at the Aoti Shooting Range.

== Schedule ==
All times are China Standard Time (UTC+08:00)

| Date | Time | Event |
|---|---|---|
| Saturday, 13 November 2010 | 11:30 | Final |

== Records ==
Prior to this competition, the existing world, Asian and Games records were as follows.

| World Record | Russia | 1792 | Winterthur, Switzerland | 1 March 2008 |
| Asian Record | China | 1788 | Busan, South Korea | 2 October 2002 |
| Games Record | China | 1788 | Busan, South Korea | 2 October 2002 |

== Results ==
Legend

- DNS — Did not start

| Rank | Team | Series | | | | | | Total | Xs | Notes |
| Rank | Team | 1 | 2 | 3 | 4 | 5 | 6 | Total | Xs | Notes |
|---|---|---|---|---|---|---|---|---|---|---|
| 1st place, gold medalist(s) | China (CHN) | 300 | 298 | 294 | 299 | 295 | 298 | 1784 | 143 | |
| | Cao Yifei | 100 | 99 | 98 | 100 | 96 | 98 | 591 | 45 | |
| | Yu Jikang | 100 | 99 | 98 | 99 | 99 | 100 | 595 | 42 | |
| | Zhu Qinan | 100 | 100 | 98 | 100 | 100 | 100 | 598 | 56 | |
| 2nd place, silver medalist(s) | India (IND) | 297 | 295 | 298 | 300 | 296 | 297 | 1783 | 142 | |
| | Abhinav Bindra | 100 | 99 | 99 | 100 | 97 | 98 | 593 | 47 | |
| | Gagan Narang | 99 | 98 | 100 | 100 | 100 | 100 | 597 | 47 | |
| | Sanjeev Rajput | 98 | 98 | 99 | 100 | 99 | 99 | 593 | 48 | |
| 3rd place, bronze medalist(s) | South Korea (KOR) | 298 | 294 | 296 | 299 | 297 | 296 | 1780 | 147 | |
| | Choi Sung-soon | 99 | 98 | 97 | 100 | 100 | 97 | 591 | 46 | |
| | Kim Jong-hyun | 100 | 98 | 99 | 99 | 98 | 99 | 593 | 50 | |
| | Kim Ki-won | 99 | 98 | 100 | 100 | 99 | 100 | 596 | 51 | |
| 4 | Mongolia (MGL) | 298 | 292 | 296 | 297 | 296 | 292 | 1771 | 121 | |
| | Boldbaataryn Bishrel | 100 | 98 | 100 | 98 | 99 | 99 | 594 | 44 | |
| | Dondovyn Ganzorig | 100 | 97 | 99 | 100 | 99 | 96 | 591 | 36 | |
| | Tsedevdorjiin Mönkh-Erdene | 98 | 97 | 97 | 99 | 98 | 97 | 586 | 41 | |
| 5 | Iran (IRI) | 295 | 292 | 298 | 290 | 293 | 293 | 1761 | 119 | |
| | Hossein Bagheri | 96 | 97 | 98 | 96 | 97 | 97 | 581 | 34 | |
| | Mehdi Jafari Pouya | 100 | 98 | 100 | 97 | 96 | 98 | 589 | 39 | |
| | Saber Parasti | 99 | 97 | 100 | 97 | 100 | 98 | 591 | 46 | |
| 6 | Singapore (SIN) | 291 | 298 | 293 | 290 | 295 | 294 | 1761 | 113 | |
| | Jonathan Koh | 98 | 100 | 96 | 95 | 98 | 98 | 585 | 33 | |
| | Ong Jun Hong | 98 | 99 | 98 | 98 | 99 | 99 | 591 | 46 | |
| | Zhang Jin | 95 | 99 | 99 | 97 | 98 | 97 | 585 | 34 | |
| 7 | Kazakhstan (KAZ) | 292 | 287 | 291 | 288 | 295 | 298 | 1751 | 112 | |
| | Vitaliy Dovgun | 98 | 93 | 94 | 96 | 96 | 100 | 577 | 35 | |
| | Igor Pirekeyev | 97 | 98 | 97 | 97 | 100 | 99 | 588 | 37 | |
| | Yuriy Yurkov | 97 | 96 | 100 | 95 | 99 | 99 | 586 | 40 | |
| 8 | Bangladesh (BAN) | 295 | 291 | 294 | 290 | 290 | 291 | 1751 | 105 | |
| | Abdullah Hel Baki | 99 | 98 | 98 | 96 | 97 | 97 | 585 | 37 | |
| | Asif Hossain Khan | 97 | 99 | 98 | 98 | 97 | 96 | 585 | 39 | |
| | Taufick Shahrear Khan | 99 | 94 | 98 | 96 | 96 | 98 | 581 | 29 | |
| 9 | Kyrgyzstan (KGZ) | 287 | 291 | 294 | 291 | 294 | 290 | 1747 | 107 | |
| | Ruslan Ismailov | 98 | 100 | 99 | 99 | 99 | 98 | 593 | 44 | |
| | Arzybek Makhmadov | 96 | 98 | 99 | 97 | 97 | 97 | 584 | 35 | |
| | Askat Tokmokov | 93 | 93 | 96 | 95 | 98 | 95 | 570 | 28 | |
| 10 | Thailand (THA) | 293 | 287 | 291 | 290 | 293 | 291 | 1745 | 102 | |
| | Varavut Majchacheep | 99 | 97 | 98 | 99 | 99 | 97 | 589 | 41 | |
| | Worawat Suriyajun | 97 | 97 | 95 | 93 | 99 | 97 | 578 | 32 | |
| | Nuttakorn Tongwon | 97 | 93 | 98 | 98 | 95 | 97 | 578 | 29 | |
| 11 | Vietnam (VIE) | 290 | 289 | 292 | 287 | 284 | 287 | 1729 | 88 | |
| | Dương Anh Quân | 98 | 94 | 98 | 97 | 97 | 95 | 579 | 31 | |
| | Phạm Ngọc Thanh | 99 | 98 | 99 | 95 | 94 | 96 | 581 | 32 | |
| | Vũ Thành Hưng | 93 | 97 | 95 | 95 | 93 | 96 | 569 | 25 | |
| 12 | Saudi Arabia (KSA) | 285 | 282 | 283 | 292 | 287 | 286 | 1715 | 78 | |
| | Faiz Al-Anazi | 94 | 96 | 93 | 97 | 98 | 96 | 574 | 25 | |
| | Nasser Al-Harthi | 96 | 96 | 95 | 98 | 95 | 96 | 576 | 29 | |
| | Faisal Al-Saad | 95 | 90 | 95 | 97 | 94 | 94 | 565 | 24 | |
| — | Malaysia (MAS) | | | | | | | DNS | | |
| | Nurrahimin Abdul Halim | 96 | 94 | 95 | 99 | 99 | 96 | 579 | 31 | |
| | Hisyam Adzha | | | | | | | DNS | | |
| | Mohd Shahril Sahak | 95 | 95 | 98 | 100 | 96 | 96 | 580 | 28 | |
| — | Qatar (QAT) | | | | | | | DNS | | |
| | Abdulla Al-Ahmad | 98 | 99 | 95 | 97 | 96 | 96 | 581 | 28 | |
| | Abdulla Al-Madeed | | | | | | | DNS | | |
| | Ali Al-Muhannadi | 96 | 96 | 97 | 98 | 97 | 97 | 581 | 32 | |
