= Shooting at the 2022 Asian Games – Men's 10 metre air rifle team =

Men's 10 metre air rifle team at the 2022 Asian Games
- Venue: Fuyang Yinhu Sports Centre
- Dates: 25 September 2023
- Competitors: 42 from 14 nations

Medalists
| gold medal | India; Divyansh Singh Panwar, Rudrankksh Patil, Aishwary Pratap Singh Tomar |
| silver medal | South Korea; Kim Sang-do, Nam Tae-yun, Park Ha-jun |
| bronze medal | China; Du Linshu, Sheng Lihao, Yu Haonan |

The men's 10 metre air rifle team competition at the 2022 Asian Games in Hangzhou, China was held on 25 September 2023 at the Fuyang Yinhu Sports Centre.

== Schedule ==
All times are China Standard Time (UTC+08:00)

| Date | Time | Event |
|---|---|---|
| Monday, 25 September 2022 | 09:00 | Final |

== Records ==
Prior to this competition, the existing world, Asian and Games records were as follows.

| World Record | China | 1893.3 | Baku, Azerbaijan | 19 August 2023 |
| Asian Record | China | 1893.3 | Baku, Azerbaijan | 19 August 2023 |
| Games Record | China | 1886.4 | Incheon, Korea | 23 September 2014 |

== Results ==
| Rank | Team | Series | | | | | | Total | Notes |
| Rank | Team | 1 | 2 | 3 | 4 | 5 | 6 | Total | Notes |
|---|---|---|---|---|---|---|---|---|---|
| 1st place, gold medalist(s) | India (IND) | 313.7 | 315.9 | 313.7 | 315.9 | 318.7 | 315.8 | 1893.7 | WR |
| | Divyansh Singh Panwar | 104.8 | 104.3 | 104.6 | 104.7 | 106.3 | 104.9 | 629.6 | |
| | Rudrankksh Patil | 104.8 | 106.1 | 103.8 | 105.5 | 106.7 | 105.6 | 632.5 | |
| | Aishwary Pratap Singh Tomar | 104.1 | 105.5 | 105.3 | 105.7 | 105.7 | 105.3 | 631.6 | |
| 2nd place, silver medalist(s) | South Korea (KOR) | 311.9 | 316.6 | 315.0 | 317.1 | 316.0 | 313.5 | 1890.1 | |
| | Kim Sang-do | 104.4 | 105.6 | 104.5 | 105.1 | 105.2 | 104.3 | 629.1 | |
| | Nam Tae-yun | 103.4 | 105.8 | 105.1 | 105.7 | 104.8 | 103.4 | 628.2 | |
| | Park Ha-jun | 104.1 | 105.2 | 105.4 | 106.3 | 106.0 | 105.8 | 632.8 | |
| 3rd place, bronze medalist(s) | China (CHN) | 315.0 | 313.1 | 315.9 | 313.7 | 314.1 | 316.4 | 1888.2 | |
| | Du Linshu | 104.6 | 103.8 | 105.4 | 105.8 | 105.1 | 105.3 | 630.0 | |
| | Sheng Lihao | 105.2 | 106.2 | 105.7 | 105.1 | 106.0 | 106.3 | 634.5 | |
| | Yu Haonan | 105.2 | 103.1 | 104.8 | 102.8 | 103.0 | 104.8 | 623.7 | |
| 4 | Iran (IRI) | 312.7 | 312.0 | 315.2 | 315.2 | 315.7 | 314.8 | 1885.6 | |
| | Amir Mohammad Nekounam | 103.8 | 104.3 | 104.8 | 104.6 | 106.1 | 105.2 | 628.8 | |
| | Pouria Norouzian | 104.9 | 104.0 | 105.5 | 105.6 | 104.5 | 104.7 | 629.2 | |
| | Mahyar Sedaghat | 104.0 | 103.7 | 104.9 | 105.0 | 105.1 | 104.9 | 627.6 | |
| 5 | Thailand (THA) | 310.9 | 315.3 | 311.7 | 313.1 | 316.2 | 311.9 | 1879.1 | |
| | Chanon Binmad | 102.3 | 104.1 | 103.6 | 104.1 | 104.7 | 104.0 | 622.8 | |
| | Pongsaton Panyatong | 103.4 | 104.9 | 103.0 | 104.1 | 104.9 | 104.2 | 624.5 | |
| | Napis Tortungpanich | 105.2 | 106.3 | 105.1 | 104.9 | 106.6 | 103.7 | 631.8 | |
| 6 | Japan (JPN) | 313.1 | 309.7 | 316.0 | 314.0 | 311.3 | 312.5 | 1876.6 | |
| | Masaya Endo | 104.9 | 103.1 | 105.3 | 105.4 | 104.0 | 105.3 | 628.0 | |
| | Atsushi Shimada | 104.6 | 103.9 | 105.2 | 105.2 | 103.6 | 105.2 | 627.7 | |
| | Akihito Shimizu | 103.6 | 102.7 | 105.5 | 103.4 | 103.7 | 102.0 | 620.9 | |
| 7 | Bangladesh (BAN) | 313.8 | 310.7 | 312.5 | 312.7 | 313.5 | 312.4 | 1875.6 | |
| | Tamjid Bin Alam | 104.8 | 103.3 | 104.1 | 104.6 | 105.0 | 103.7 | 625.5 | |
| | Robiul Islam | 104.8 | 103.2 | 103.3 | 104.7 | 103.9 | 104.0 | 623.9 | |
| | Arnab Sharar | 104.2 | 104.2 | 105.1 | 103.4 | 104.6 | 104.7 | 626.2 | |
| 8 | Kazakhstan (KAZ) | 311.8 | 309.7 | 313.4 | 314.0 | 312.2 | 310.7 | 1871.8 | |
| | Konstantin Malinovskiy | 103.9 | 102.9 | 104.6 | 104.8 | 105.3 | 104.4 | 625.9 | |
| | Islam Satpayev | 104.6 | 105.2 | 105.5 | 104.6 | 105.4 | 104.3 | 629.6 | |
| | Yuriy Yurkov | 103.3 | 101.6 | 103.3 | 104.6 | 101.5 | 102.0 | 616.3 | |
| 9 | Chinese Taipei (TPE) | 311.5 | 311.1 | 310.6 | 311.8 | 310.6 | 312.8 | 1868.4 | |
| | Chen Chun-an | 103.9 | 102.9 | 104.0 | 104.7 | 102.8 | 103.8 | 622.1 | |
| | Lu Shao-chuan | 103.7 | 105.6 | 104.1 | 103.2 | 104.1 | 103.7 | 624.4 | |
| | Sung Chia-yen | 103.9 | 102.6 | 102.5 | 103.9 | 103.7 | 105.3 | 621.9 | |
| 10 | Mongolia (MGL) | 311.2 | 309.4 | 310.7 | 311.2 | 309.9 | 311.7 | 1864.1 | |
| | Nyantain Bayaraa | 105.4 | 104.4 | 105.6 | 104.9 | 105.9 | 104.2 | 630.4 | |
| | Batbayaryn Erkhembayar | 103.6 | 103.8 | 103.6 | 103.9 | 104.0 | 103.4 | 622.3 | |
| | Tsedevdorjiin Mönkh-Erdene | 102.2 | 101.2 | 101.5 | 102.4 | 100.0 | 104.1 | 611.4 | |
| 11 | Bahrain (BRN) | 309.5 | 312.0 | 307.4 | 310.0 | 310.1 | 310.6 | 1859.6 | |
| | Husain Abduljabbar | 102.7 | 104.0 | 101.5 | 102.4 | 103.1 | 103.0 | 616.7 | |
| | Khaled Mohamed Al-Doseri | 104.7 | 103.1 | 101.4 | 103.9 | 103.7 | 103.7 | 620.5 | |
| | Mahmood Haji | 102.1 | 104.9 | 104.5 | 103.7 | 103.3 | 103.9 | 622.4 | |
| 12 | Saudi Arabia (KSA) | 308.9 | 309.5 | 307.6 | 311.0 | 307.8 | 310.0 | 1854.8 | |
| | Mesfer Al-Ammari | 102.3 | 103.9 | 103.2 | 104.1 | 105.2 | 105.8 | 624.5 | |
| | Hussain Al-Harbi | 102.9 | 102.2 | 102.8 | 103.0 | 100.9 | 102.7 | 614.5 | |
| | Bader Al-Otibi | 103.7 | 103.4 | 101.6 | 103.9 | 101.7 | 101.5 | 615.8 | |
| 13 | Pakistan (PAK) | 307.1 | 304.0 | 303.9 | 312.3 | 310.5 | 310.0 | 1847.8 | |
| | Ghufran Adil | 103.7 | 103.9 | 102.0 | 105.5 | 103.7 | 103.9 | 622.7 | |
| | Zeeshan Farid | 101.7 | 97.3 | 100.7 | 103.6 | 102.8 | 102.3 | 608.4 | |
| | Aqib Latif | 101.7 | 102.8 | 101.2 | 103.2 | 104.0 | 103.8 | 616.7 | |
| 14 | Kuwait (KUW) | 306.7 | 309.0 | 305.5 | 311.4 | 306.0 | 308.6 | 1847.2 | |
| | Abdullah Al-Harbi | 103.3 | 105.0 | 100.0 | 103.8 | 101.6 | 101.6 | 615.3 | |
| | Ali Al-Mutairi | 101.3 | 103.7 | 102.2 | 103.5 | 103.6 | 104.0 | 618.3 | |
| | Saud Al-Subaiei | 102.1 | 100.3 | 103.3 | 104.1 | 100.8 | 103.0 | 613.6 | |
