= Yang Haoran =

Chinese sport shooter (born 1996)

Personal information
- Nationality: Chinese
- Born: 22 February 1996 (age 30) Chengde, Hebei, China
- Height: 1.78 m (5 ft 10 in)
- Weight: 68 kg (150 lb)

Sport
- Country: China
- Sport: Shooting
- Event(s): 10 m air rifle (AR60); 50 m rifle 3 positions (FR3X40)
- Club: Hebei Sports
- Coached by: Cai Yalin
Medal record
Men's shooting
Representing China
Olympic Games
Gold medal – first place	2020 Tokyo	10 meter air rifle mixed team
Bronze medal – third place	2020 Tokyo	10 m air rifle
World Championships
Gold medal – first place	2014 Granada	10 m air rifle
Gold medal – first place	2014 Granada	10 m air rifle team
Gold medal – first place	2018 Changwon	10 m air rifle mixed team
Gold medal – first place	2018 Changwon	10 m team air rifle
Gold medal – first place	2022 Cairo	10 m air rifle mixed team
Gold medal – first place	2023 Baku	10 m air rifle team
Silver medal – second place	2018 Changwon	50 m team rifle 3 positions
Silver medal – second place	2022 Cairo	10 metre air rifle team
Silver medal – second place	2023 Baku	10 m air rifle
Asian Games
Gold medal – first place	2014 Incheon	10 m air rifle
Gold medal – first place	2018 Jakarta-Palembang	10 m air rifle
Silver medal – second place	2018 Jakarta-Palembang	10 m air rifle mixed team
Asian Championships
Gold medal – first place	2015 Kuwait City	10 m air rifle
Gold medal – first place	2015 Kuwait City	10 m air rifle team
Youth Olympic
Gold medal – first place	2014 Nanjing	10 m air rifle

Yang Haoran (Chinese: 杨皓然; pinyin: Yáng Hàorán; born 22 February 1996) is a Chinese sport shooter. He has collected a career tally of fourteen medals (nine golds and five silver) and broke eight world junior records in air rifle shooting at major international competitions, spanning the Youth Olympics, Asian Games, World Championships, and World Cup series. Having pursued the sport since age 12, Yang trained full-time as a member of the Chinese shooting team, at the sports academy in Chengde, under his personal coach and 2000 Olympic champion Cai Yalin.

Yang took part in his first international competition as a 17-year-old at the 2013 ISSF World Cup final meet in Munich, Germany, where he claimed the gold medal in the 10 m air rifle, finishing in first with 205.9 points, ahead of World Champion Niccolo Campriani.

When China hosted the 2014 Summer Youth Olympics in Nanjing, Yang maintained a comfortable lead over the rest of the field to win the gold medal for his team in the boys' 10 m air rifle with a record of 209.3. Less than a month later, Yang captured his first ever title at the World Championships in Granada, Spain, setting a new junior world record of 632.1 points. Yang's win vaulted him to the top of the world rankings and also granted him one of the six Olympic quota places for Rio 2016.

On his senior debut at the Asian Games in Incheon, South Korea, Yang added another individual gold to his career tally by leading the medal haul for China in the 10 m air rifle with a score of 209.6 points. Yang's win also helped his fellow shooters Cao Yifei and Liu Tianyou deliver a first-place finish over the rest of the field in the team event, finishing with an aggregated tally of 1886.4.

== See also ==
- List of Youth Olympic Games gold medalists who won Olympic gold medals
