= Nam Tae-yun =

South Korean sport shooter

Personal information
- Nationality: South Korean
- Born: 23 March 1998 (age 28) Pyeongtaek, Gyeonggi, South Korea

Sport
- Country: South Korea
- Sport: Shooting
- Event: Air rifle
Medal record
World Championships
Bronze medal – third place	2018 Changwon	10 m air rifle team
Asian Games
Silver medal – second place	2022 Hangzhou	10 m air rifle team
Asian Championships
Silver medal – second place	2019 Doha	10 m air rifle team

Nam Tae-yun (born 23 March 1998) is a South Korean sport shooter. He won the silver medal in the 10 m air rifle team at the 2022 Asian Games.

Nam participated at the 2018 ISSF World Shooting Championships, and at the 2020 Summer Olympics.
