= 2021 Asian Airgun Championships =

- Host city: Shymkent, Kazakhstan
- Dates: 12–19 September 2021
- Main venue: Shooting Plaza Complex

The 2021 Asian Airgun Championships were held at Shooting Plaza Complex, Shymkent, Kazakhstan between 12 and 19 September 2021.

== Medal summary ==
=== Men ===
Event	Gold	Silver	Bronze
10 m air pistol	Eldar Imankulov; Kazakhstan	Safar Al-Dosari; Saudi Arabia	Noppadon Sutiviruch; Thailand
10 m air pistol team	Kazakhstan; Eldar Imankulov; Vladimir Issachenko; Valeriy Rakhimzhan	Saudi Arabia; Atallah Al-Anazi; Safar Al-Dosari; Aqeel Al-Badrani	Kyrgyzstan; Alexsandr Koshelev; Askat Tokmokov; Sanzharbek Erkinbaev
10 m air rifle	Islam Usseinov; Kazakhstan	Napis Tortungpanich; Thailand	Mahmood Haji; Bahrain
10 m air rifle team	Kazakhstan; Islam Usseinov; Yuriy Yurkov; Alexey Kleimyonov	Uzbekistan; Sukhrobjon Mirzajonov; Vadim Skorovarov; Bekhzod Rakhmatillaev	Saudi Arabia; Faiz Al-Anazi; Hussain Al-Harbi; Mesfer Al-Ammari
10 m running target	Muhammad Sejahtera Dwi Putra; Indonesia	Andrey Khudyakov; Kazakhstan	Bakhtiyar Ibrayev; Kazakhstan
10 m running target mixed	Muhammad Sejahtera Dwi Putra; Indonesia	Andrey Khudyakov; Kazakhstan	Bakhtiyar Ibrayev; Kazakhstan

=== Women ===
Event	Gold	Silver	Bronze
10 m air pistol	Natsara Champalat; Thailand	Tanyaporn Prucksakorn; Thailand	Olga Axenova; Kazakhstan
10 m air pistol team	Thailand; Tanyaporn Prucksakorn; Chidchanok Hirunphoem; Natsara Champalat	Kazakhstan; Irina Loktionova; Diana Kharchenko; Olga Axenova	Bahrain; Mooza Ali; Aysha Al-Braiki; Badreya Al-Atawi
10 m air rifle	Monica Daryanti; Indonesia	Ivana Roderica Tioho; Indonesia	Thanyalak Chotphibunsin; Thailand
10 m air rifle team	Indonesia; Monica Daryanti; Ivana Roderica Tioho; Vidya Rafika Toyyiba	Kazakhstan; Yelizaveta Bezrukova; Yelizaveta Korol; Yelizaveta Pushkareva	Bahrain; Marwa Al-Amairi; Sara Al-Dosari; Safa Al-Doseri
10 m running target	Amal Mohammed; Qatar	Fatima Irnazarova; Kazakhstan	Zukhra Irnazarova; Kazakhstan
10 m running target mixed	Zukhra Irnazarova; Kazakhstan	Alexandra Saduakassova; Kazakhstan	Amal Mohammed; Qatar

=== Mixed ===
Event	Gold	Silver	Bronze
10 m air pistol team	Thailand; Noppadon Sutiviruch; Tanyaporn Prucksakorn	Kazakhstan; Eldar Imankulov; Irina Loktionova	Kazakhstan; Valeriy Rakhimzhan; Olga Axenova
10 m air rifle team	Thailand; Napis Tortungpanich; Chanittha Sastwej	Uzbekistan; Vadim Skorovarov; Mukhtasar Tokhirova	Kazakhstan; Islam Usseinov; Yelizaveta Bezrukova

== Medal table ==
Rank	Nation	Gold	Silver	Bronze	Total
1	Kazakhstan	5	7	6	18
2	Thailand	4	2	2	8
3	Indonesia	4	1	0	5
4	Qatar	1	0	1	2
5	Saudi Arabia	0	2	1	3
6	Uzbekistan	0	2	0	2
7	Bahrain	0	0	3	3
8	Kyrgyzstan	0	0	1	1
Totals (8 entries)		14	14	14	42
