= Yelizaveta Korol =

Kazakhstani sports shooter

Personal information
- Born: 2 September 1994 (age 31)

Sport
- Sport: Sports shooting
Medal record
Women's shooting
Representing Kazakhstan
Asian Championships
Gold medal – first place	2015 Kuwait City	50 m rifle prone team
Asian Airgun Championships
Silver medal – second place	2021 Shymkent	10 m air rifle team

Yelizaveta Korol (Елизавета Владимировна Король, (Полищук), née Lunina, born 2 September 1994) is a Kazakhstani sports shooter. She competed in the women's 10 metre air rifle event at the 2016 Summer Olympics.
