= Zhang Fusheng =

Chinese sports shooter

Personal information
- Born: 20 September 1993 (age 32) Guangdong, China

Sport
- Sport: Sports shooting
Medal record
Men's shooting
Representing China
Asian Championships
Gold medal – first place	2015 Kuwait City	25 m rapid fire pistol team
Silver medal – second place	2015 Kuwait City	25 m rapid fire pistol
Silver medal – second place	2015 Kuwait City	25 m standard pistol team

Zhang Fusheng (born 20 September 1993) is a Chinese sports shooter. He competed in the men's 25 metre rapid fire pistol event at the 2016 Summer Olympics.
