= 2015 Asian Shooting Championships =

Shooting event in Kuwait

- Host city: Kuwait City, Kuwait
- Dates: 1–12 November 2015
- Main venue: Sheikh Sabah Al-Ahmad Olympic Shooting Complex

The 2015 Asian Shooting Championships was held in Kuwait between November 1 and November 12. This tournament was supposed to be an Asian qualifying tournament for the 2016 Summer Olympics in Rio, but this qualification event lost its Rio Olymipics qualification status when the IOC suspended Kuwait NOC for government interference.

Yair Davidovitz, an Israeli International Shooting Sport Federation (ISSF) technical delegate, was slated to supervise the event in Kuwait for the ISSF in 2015. Kuwait rejected the Israeli's visa for the 2015 Asian Shooting Championships which was originally the tournament that would offer Asian quotas for the 2016 Rio Olympics, and Davidovitz was backed by the International Olympic Committee and the ISSF, and the qualifiers were moved to New Delhi, India. The IOC said:

The decision comes after the designated technical delegate from the ISSF, Yair Davidovich (Israel), who was due to supervise the event on behalf of the ISSF, was denied a visa by the Kuwaiti Immigration Department. The denial of a visa is against the non-discrimination principle of the Olympic Charter.

== Medal summary ==
=== Men ===
Event	Gold	Silver	Bronze
10 m air pistol	Jin Jong-oh; South Korea	Pang Wei; China	Pu Qifeng; China
10 m air pistol team	China; Pang Wei; Pu Qifeng; Wang Zhiwei	South Korea; Jin Jong-oh; Kim Cheong-yong; Lee Dae-myung	Vietnam; Hoàng Xuân Vinh; Nguyễn Hoàng Phương; Trần Quốc Cường
25 m center fire pistol	Jang Dae-kyu; South Korea	Pongpol Kulchairattana; Thailand	Vijay Kumar; India
25 m center fire pistol team	South Korea; Hwang Yoon-sam; Jang Dae-kyu; Kim Jun-hong	India; Samaresh Jung; Vijay Kumar; Pemba Tamang	Vietnam; Hà Minh Thành; Hoàng Xuân Vinh; Phan Xuân Chuyên
25 m rapid fire pistol	Li Yuehong; China	Zhang Fusheng; China	Kim Jun-hong; South Korea
25 m rapid fire pistol team	China; Li Yuehong; Zhang Fusheng; Zhang Jian	South Korea; Hwang Yoon-sam; Jang Dae-kyu; Kim Jun-hong	India; Akshay Suhas Ashtaputre; Neeraj Kumar; Vijay Kumar
25 m standard pistol	Jang Dae-kyu; South Korea	Mahendra Singh; India	Oyuuny Tögöldör; Mongolia
25 m standard pistol team	South Korea; Hwang Yoon-sam; Jang Dae-kyu; Kim Jun-hong	China; Li Yuehong; Zhang Fusheng; Zhang Jian	India; Neeraj Kumar; Gurpreet Singh; Mahendra Singh
50 m pistol	Park Dae-hun; South Korea	Jitu Rai; India	Pang Wei; China
50 m pistol team	South Korea; Jin Jong-oh; Lee Dae-myung; Park Dae-hun	China; Mai Jiajie; Pang Wei; Wang Zhiwei	Chinese Taipei; Chang Lu; Kuo Kuan-ting; Yang Jui-hao
10 m air rifle	Yang Haoran; China	Cao Yifei; China	Pouria Norouzian; Iran
10 m air rifle team	China; Cao Yifei; Yang Haoran; Zhu Qinan	South Korea; Choi Chang-hoon; Kim Dae-seon; Kim Sang-do	Iran; Hossein Bagheri; Pouria Norouzian; Mohammad Zaer Rezaei
50 m rifle prone	Attapon Uea-aree; Thailand	Han Jin-seop; South Korea	Kim Jong-hyun; South Korea
50 m rifle prone team	South Korea; Han Jin-seop; Kim Hyeon-jun; Kim Jong-hyun	China; Hou Kai; Li Jiahong; Zhao Shengbo	Kazakhstan; Alexey Kleimyonov; Igor Pirekeyev; Alexandr Yermakov
50 m rifle 3 positions	Kim Jong-hyun; South Korea	Zhu Qinan; China	Hui Zicheng; China
50 m rifle 3 positions team	South Korea; Han Jin-seop; Kim Hyeon-jun; Kim Jong-hyun	China; Cao Yifei; Hui Zicheng; Zhu Qinan	Kazakhstan; Igor Pirekeyev; Alexandr Yermakov; Yuriy Yurkov
Trap	Lee Young-sik; South Korea	Hagen Topacio; Philippines	Talal Al-Rashidi; Kuwait
Trap team	Kuwait; Fehaid Al-Deehani; Abdulrahman Al-Faihan; Talal Al-Rashidi	China; Gao Bo; Li Yang; Zhang Yiyao	India; Kynan Chenai; Manavjit Singh Sandhu; Prithviraj Tondaiman
Double trap	Fehaid Al-Deehani; Kuwait	Hu Binyuan; China	Hamad Al-Marri; Qatar
Double trap team	Kuwait; Ahmad Al-Afasi; Fehaid Al-Deehani; Saad Al-Mutairi	China; Hu Binyuan; Wang Hao; Zou Xing	Qatar; Masoud Hamad Al-Athba; Rashid Hamad Al-Athba; Hamad Al-Marri
Skeet	Saud Habib; Kuwait	Saif Bin Futtais; United Arab Emirates	Tang Shuai; China
Skeet team	China; Jin Di; Tang Shuai; Zhang Fan	Kuwait; Zaid Al-Mutairi; Abdullah Al-Rashidi; Saud Habib	United Arab Emirates; Mohamed Hussain Ahmed; Saeed Al-Maktoum; Saif Bin Futtais

=== Women ===
Event	Gold	Silver	Bronze
10 m air pistol	Heena Sidhu; India	Otryadyn Gündegmaa; Mongolia	Kim Jang-mi; South Korea
10 m air pistol team	South Korea; Han Yoo-jung; Kim Jang-mi; Oh Min-kyung	Chinese Taipei; Tien Chia-chen; Wu Chia-ying; Yu Ai-wen	China; Guo Wenjun; Zhang Mengxue; Zhang Jingjing
25 m pistol	Zhang Jingjing; China	Han Yoo-jung; South Korea	Cao Lijia; China
25 m pistol team	South Korea; Han Yoo-jung; Kim Jang-mi; Koh Eun	China; Chen Ying; Cao Lijia; Zhang Jingjing	Mongolia; Taivanbaataryn Gantuul; Otryadyn Gündegmaa; Tsogbadrakhyn Mönkhzul
10 m air rifle	Yi Siling; China	Du Li; China	Narjes Emamgholinejad; Iran
10 m air rifle team	China; Du Li; Yi Siling; Zhang Binbin	Iran; Elaheh Ahmadi; Narjes Emamgholinejad; Mahlagha Jambozorg	South Korea; Im Ha-na; Kim Hye-in; Lee Seung-yeon
50 m rifle prone	Zhanel Serikbayeva; Kazakhstan	Sununta Majchacheep; Thailand	Muslifah Zulkifli; Malaysia
50 m rifle prone team	Kazakhstan; Yelizaveta Korol; Zhanel Serikbayeva; Violetta Starostina	Thailand; Sununta Majchacheep; Ratchadaporn Plengsaengthong; Supamas Wankaew	China; Chen Dongqi; Du Li; Zhang Binbin
50 m rifle 3 positions	Chen Dongqi; China	Chuluunbadrakhyn Narantuyaa; Mongolia	Yoo Seo-young; South Korea
50 m rifle 3 positions team	China; Chen Dongqi; Du Li; Zhang Binbin	South Korea; Jang Ha-na; Kwon Na-ra; Yoo Seo-young	India; Lajja Goswami; Elizabeth Koshy; Anjum Moudgil
Trap	Lin Yi-chun; Chinese Taipei	Ray Bassil; Lebanon	Liu Yingzi; China
Trap team	China; Deng Weiyun; Liu Yingzi; Zhu Jingyu	South Korea; Cho Seon-ah; Kang Gee-eun; Lee Bo-na	Kazakhstan; Anastassiya Davydova; Mariya Dmitriyenko; Oxana Sereda
Skeet	Isarapa Imprasertsuk; Thailand	Lin Piaopiao; China	Wei Ning; China
Skeet team	Thailand; Isarapa Imprasertsuk; Sutiya Jiewchaloemmit; Nutchaya Sutarporn	China; Lin Piaopiao; Wei Meng; Wei Ning	Kuwait; Shaikhah Al-Rashidi; Eman Al-Shamaa; Afrah Bin Hussain

== Medal table ==
Rank	Nation	Gold	Silver	Bronze	Total
1	South Korea	13	7	5	25
2	China	12	15	9	36
3	Kuwait	4	1	2	7
4	Thailand	3	3	0	6
5	Kazakhstan	2	0	3	5
6	India	1	3	5	9
7	Chinese Taipei	1	1	1	3
8	Mongolia	0	2	2	4
9	Iran	0	1	3	4
10	United Arab Emirates	0	1	1	2
11	Lebanon	0	1	0	1
11	Philippines	0	1	0	1
13	Qatar	0	0	2	2
13	Vietnam	0	0	2	2
15	Malaysia	0	0	1	1
Totals (15 entries)		36	36	36	108
