= Kim Hyeon-jun =

South Korean sport shooter

Personal information
- Nationality: South Korean
- Born: 18 October 1992 (age 33)
- Height: 1.75 m (5 ft 9 in)
- Weight: 59 kg (130 lb)

Sport
- Country: South Korea
- Sport: Sports shooting
- Event: Air rifle
Medal record
Men's shooting
Representing South Korea
World Championships
| Bronze medal – third place | 2018 Changwon | 10 m team air rifle |
Asian Championships
| Gold medal – first place | 2015 Kuwait City | 50 m rifle prone team |
| Gold medal – first place | 2015 Kuwait City | 50 m rifle 3 positions team |

Korean name
- Hangul: 김현준
- RR: Gim Hyeonjun
- MR: Kim Hyŏnjun

Kim Hyeon-jun (born 18 October 1992) is a South Korean sports shooter. He competed in the men's 50 metre rifle three positions event at the 2016 Summer Olympics.
