= Kwon Jun-cheol =

South Korean sports shooter

Personal information
- Born: 16 November 1988 (age 37)

Sport
- Sport: Sports shooting
Medal record
Men's shooting
Representing South Korea
Asian Championships
Bronze medal – third place	2023 Changwon	50 m rifle prone team

Kwon Jun-cheol (Korean: 권준철; born 16 November 1988) is a South Korean sports shooter. He competed in the men's 50 metre rifle prone event at the 2016 Summer Olympics.
