= Vadim Skorovarov =

Uzbekistani sports shooter (born 1996)

Personal information
- Born: 4 August 1996 (age 29)

Sport
- Sport: Sports shooting
Medal record
Men's shooting
Representing Uzbekistan
Asian Airgun Championships
Silver medal – second place	2021 Shymkent	10 m air rifle team
Silver medal – second place	2021 Shymkent	10 m air rifle mixed team

Vadim Skorovarov (born 4 August 1996) is an Uzbekistani sports shooter. He competed in the men's 10 metre air rifle event at the 2016 Summer Olympics.
