= Imran Hassan Khan =

Indian sports shooter (born 1983)

Imran Hasan Khan
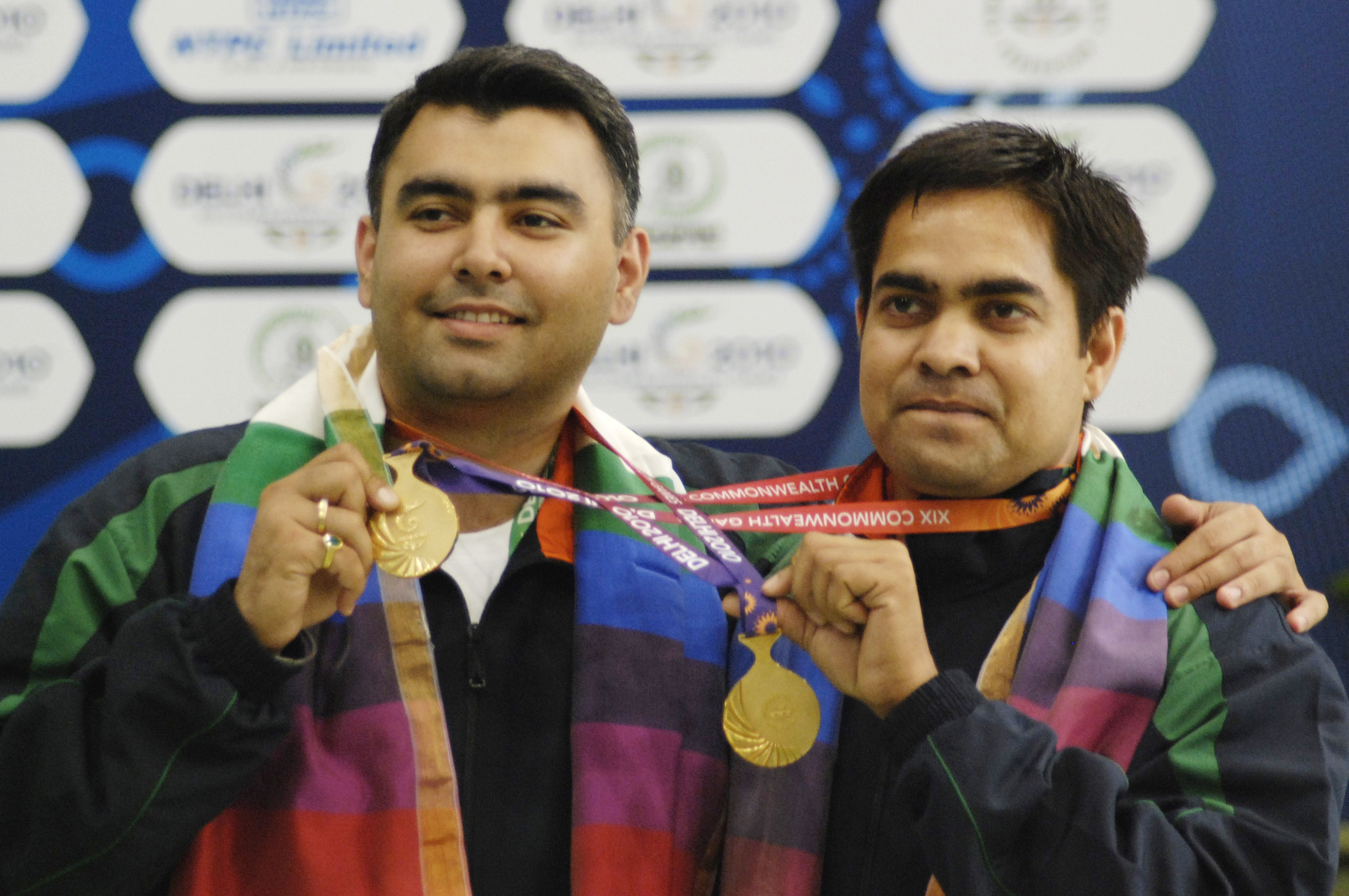
- Imran Hasan Khan (right)

Personal information
- Nationality: Indian
- Citizenship: Indian
- Born: 26 January 1983 (age 43) Bareilly, Uttar Pradesh
- Occupation: Coach

Sport
- Sport: Shooting
Medal record
Men's Shooting
Representing India
International Medals
Gold medal – first place	9
Silver medal – second place	11
Bronze medal – third place	8
National Medals
Gold medal – first place	33
Silver medal – second place	18
Bronze medal – third place	15

Imran Hasan Khan (born 26 January 1983) is an Indian shooter from Bareilly, Uttar Pradesh. He won a gold medal at the 2010 Commonwealth Games in Delhi, combining with Gagan Narang to win the pairs 50-metre rifle event. A member of the Indian Army, he has also won medals at the South Asian Games, as well as a bronze medal at the 2006 Asian Games in Doha, in the men's 50-metre rifle three positions team event. He also won Olympic quota place in 2012.

He has won a total of 28 International medals and 66 National medals in Men's 10m Air Rifle and Men's 50m 3 Position and holds a national record in Men's 3 Position (Big Bore).
