= Jayson Valdez =

Filipino sports shooter (born 1995)

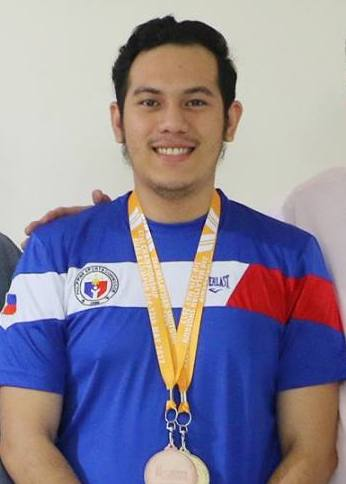
- Valdez in 2017

Personal information
- Nationality: Filipino
- Born: September 15, 1995 (age 31)
- Home town: Pasay
- Years active: 2009–

Sport
- Country: Philippines
- Sport: Shooting
- Events: 10m air rifle, 50m rifle three positions, 50m rifle prone
Medal record
Men's Shooting
Representing Philippines
Southeast Asian Games
Bronze medal – third place	2015 Singapore	10 m air rifle

Jayson Valdez (born September 15, 1995) is a Filipino sports shooter who has competed in the 2010 Asian Games and the 2018 Asian Games. He also competed at the 2020 Summer Olympics in Tokyo, Japan.

== Education ==
Valdez was a student of Malate Catholic School. He also attended Adamson University where he graduated with a degree in customs administration.

== Career ==
=== Early career ===
Valdez started his sports shooting career in 2009 and represented the Philippines in international competitions. He was part of the National Youth Development Program of the Philippine National Shooting Association. His father Julius Valdez, was a sports shooter like himself and a three-time gold medalist at the Southeast Asian Games. The younger Valdez was also coached by his father, who is also the national shooting coach. Initially Jayson took up taekwondo at age 13 and only played sports shooting with his father for leisure purposes only. He was encouraged to pursue a competitive career in shooting by his father, as well as his eventual teammate Tac Padilla, who also ran a shooting clinic.

=== 2010 to 2019 ===
Jayson Valdez competed in the 2010 Asian Games in Guangzhou, China but was not able to clinch a medal. At the 2015 Southeast Asian Games in Singapore, Valdez clinched a bronze medal.

In 2018, Valdez reportedly received an offer to compete for Singapore; a proposition he rejected. He competed in the 2018 Asian Games in Jakarta, Indonesia where he took part in the men's 10m air rifle and men's 50m rifle 3 position events; failing to progress to the finals of both events. He however, broke his own Philippine national record for the first event.

He competed in the 2019 Southeast Asian Games which was hosted by the Philippines but failed to make a podium finish.

=== 2020 Summer Olympics ===
Amidst the COVID-19 pandemic, Valdez decided to loss weight as part of his bid to get enlisted in the Philippine Army believing that the 2020 Summer Olympics scheduled to be held in Tokyo, Japan would be cancelled. According to him, his consistency in shooting has improve since his lifestyle change.

Valdez qualified for the 2020 Summer Olympics in June 2021, which has been postponed for a year due to the pandemic. He qualified through accumulating enough minimum qualifying scores in Olympic qualifying tournaments, including the 2018 Asian Championship in Kuwait and the 2019 ISSF World Cup series. Competing in the men's 10 m air rifle, Valdez failed to progress to the event final after scoring 612.6 in the qualification round. The score meant that he finished the 44th best shooter among 47 competitors.

== Personal life ==
Valdez got offered to get enlisted in the Philippine Army in 2015 but he only made the final decision to join in January 2021. He postponed his enlistment bid upon qualifying for the 2020 Summer Olympics which was postponed for a year. His father, Julius also served in the Philippine Marines with the rank of second lieutenant while his mother is a school teacher at Sun Valley Elementary School in Parañaque.
