= Kim Sang-do =

South Korean sports shooter (born 1987)

Personal information
- Nationality: South Korean
- Born: 29 May 1987 (age 39) Icheon, South Korea

Sport
- Sport: Sports shooting
Medal record
Men's shooting
Representing South Korea
World Championships
Silver medal – second place	2022 Cairo	10 m air rifle mixed team
Asian Games
Silver medal – second place	2014 Incheon	10 m air rifle team
Silver medal – second place	2022 Hangzhou	10 m air rifle team
Asian Championships
Silver medal – second place	2015 Kuwait City	10 m air rifle team
Silver medal – second place	2019 Doha	50 m rifle 3 positions team
Bronze medal – third place	2019 Doha	50 m rifle prone team
Bronze medal – third place	2024 Jakarta	50 m rifle 3 positions team
Asian Airgun Championships
Bronze medal – third place	2022 Daegu	10 m air rifle team

Kim Sang-do (Korean: 김상도; born 29 May 1987) is a South Korean sports shooter. He competed in the men's 10 metre air pistol event at the 2020 Summer Olympics. Kim won the silver medal in the 10 m air rifle mixed team at the 2014 and 2022 Asian Games, and also at the 2022 ISSF World Championships.
