= Pouria Norouzian =

Iranian sport shooter (born 1992)

Personal information
- Born: 22 January 1992 (age 34) Ilam, Iran
- Height: 1.76 m (5 ft 9 in)

Sport
- Sport: Sports shooting
- Coached by: Maryam Talebi (National Team)
Medal record
Representing Iran
Men's shooting
Asian Championships
Bronze medal – third place	2015 Kuwait City	Air Rifle
Bronze medal – third place	2015 Kuwait City	Air Rifle team
Asian Airgun Championships
Silver medal – second place	2013 Tehran	Air Rifle
Silver medal – second place	2013 Tehran	Air Rifle team
Bronze medal – third place	2024 Jakarta	10m air rifle mixed team
Islamic Solidarity Games
Gold medal – first place	2017 Baku	Rifle 3 Positions
Silver medal – second place	2017 Baku	Air Rifle mixed team

Pouria Norouzian (Persian: پوریا نوروزیان, born 22 January 1992) is an Iranian sports shooter. He competed in the men's 10 metre air rifle event at the 2016 Summer Olympics.
