= Takayuki Matsumoto =

Japanese sport shooter (born 1984)

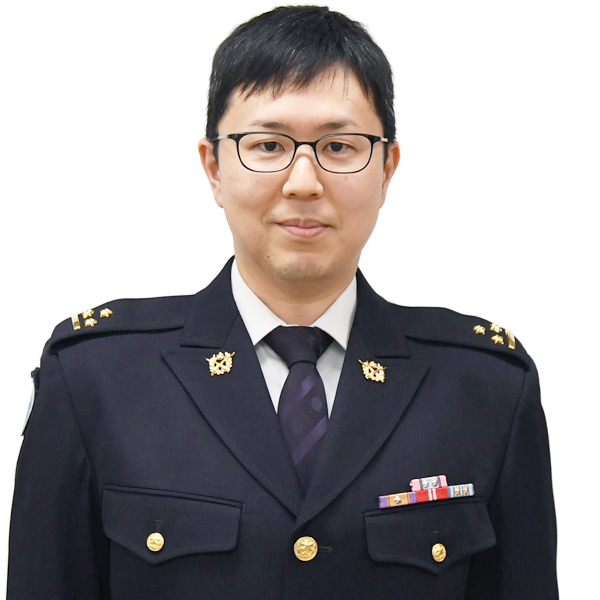

Personal information
- Born: 10 January 1984 (age 42)

Sport
- Country: Japan
- Sport: Sport shooting
Medal record
Men's sport shooting
Representing Japan
Asian Games
Bronze medal – third place	2014 Incheon	50 m rifle 3 positions team
Bronze medal – third place	2018 Jakarta	50 m rifle 3 positions
Asian Championships
Bronze medal – third place	2007 Kuwait City	10 m air rifle team
Bronze medal – third place	2023 Changwon	50 m rifle 3 positions team

Takayuki Matsumoto (Japanese: 松本崇志, born 10 January 1984) is a Japanese sport shooter. He won the bronze medal in the men's 50 metre rifle three positions event at the 2018 Asian Games held in Jakarta, Indonesia.
