= Kim Jong-hyun (sport shooter) =

South Korean sport shooter

Personal information
- Born: July 21, 1985 (age 40) Gwangju, South Korea
- Height: 1.70 m (5 ft 7 in)
- Weight: 73 kg (161 lb)

Korean name
- Hangul: 김종현
- Hanja: 金鐘鉉
- RR: Gim Jonghyeon
- MR: Kim Chonghyŏn
- IPA: [kim.dʑoŋ.ɦjʌn]

Sport
- Country: South Korea
- Sport: Shooting
- Event(s): 50 m rifle three positions, 50 m rifle prone
- Club: Changwon City Hall
- Coached by: Cho Hyun-jin
Medal record
Men's shooting
Representing South Korea
Olympic Games
Silver medal – second place	2012 London	50 m rifle 3 positions
Silver medal – second place	2016 Rio de Janeiro	50 m rifle prone
World Championships
Silver medal – second place	2010 Munich	50 m rifle prone team
Asian Games
Gold medal – first place	2010 Guangzhou	50 m rifle 3 pos. team
Gold medal – first place	2010 Guangzhou	50 m rifle prone team
Silver medal – second place	2010 Guangzhou	50 m rifle 3 positions
Bronze medal – third place	2010 Guangzhou	10 m air rifle team
Asian Championships
Gold medal – first place	2012 Doha	50 m rifle prone team
Gold medal – first place	2015 Kuwait City	50 m rifle prone team
Gold medal – first place	2015 Kuwait City	50 m rifle 3 positions
Gold medal – first place	2015 Kuwait City	50 m rifle 3 positions team
Gold medal – first place	2019 Doha	50 m rifle 3 positions
Gold medal – first place	2025 Shymkent	50 m rifle prone team
Silver medal – second place	2012 Doha	50 m rifle 3 positions
Silver medal – second place	2012 Doha	50 m rifle 3 positions team
Silver medal – second place	2019 Doha	50 m rifle 3 positions team
Bronze medal – third place	2015 Kuwait City	50 m rifle prone
Bronze medal – third place	2019 Doha	50 m rifle prone team
Bronze medal – third place	2023 Changwon	50 m rifle prone team
Bronze medal – third place	2024 Jakarta	50 m rifle 3 positions team

Kim Jong-hyun (Korean: 김종현; born July 21, 1985) is a South Korean sport shooter. He competed at the 2012 Summer Olympics in the Men's 10 metre air rifle, where he did not reach the final. He was far more successful in the men's 50 metre rifle - three positions event, where he won the silver medal. At the 2016 Olympic Games he also secured a silver medal in 50 m rifle prone.
