= Zhu Qinan =

Chinese sport shooter (born 1984)

Medal record

Men's shooting

Representing China

Olympic Games
Gold medal – first place	2004 Athens	10 m Air Rifle
Silver medal – second place	2008 Beijing	10 m Air Rifle

Asian Championships
Gold medal – first place	2012 Doha	10 m air rifle team
Gold medal – first place	2015 Kuwait City	10 m air rifle team
Silver medal – second place	2007 Kuwait City	10 m air rifle team
Silver medal – second place	2012 Doha	10 m air rifle
Silver medal – second place	2015 Kuwait City	50 m rifle 3 positions
Silver medal – second place	2015 Kuwait City	50 m rifle 3 positions team

Zhu Qinan (simplified Chinese: 朱启南; traditional Chinese: 朱啟南; pinyin: Zhū Qǐnán; born November 15, 1984, in Wenzhou, Zhejiang) is a male Chinese sport shooter. He won the gold medal at the 2004 Athens Olympics in the Men's 10 m Air Rifle event and a silver medal at the 2008 Beijing Olympics in the Men's 10 m Air Rifle event. Zhu currently is studying at Zhejiang University.

Zhu began shooting training at Wenzhou Sports School in 1999. From there, in February 2002, he joined the Zhejiang province shooting team. Zhu joined the national shooting team on December 14, 2003. At the time of his Olympic victory, he was still a junior, and his qualification round score of 599 was an equalled junior world record. He repeated this achievement at the 2004 ISSF World Cup Final in Bangkok, which he also won. He has since then won several ISSF World Cup competitions in 10 m Air Rifle. On September 22, 2011, Zhu shot a perfect 600 in the qualification round. He scored 103.8 in the final round making a total score of 703.8 to gain the 10 m Air Rifle final world record. His best result in 50 m Rifle is a bronze medal from the 2004 Asian Championships. Zhu is 5'11" tall and weighs 148 pounds. At the 51st ISSF World Championship held in Granada, Spain, Zhu got gold medal in 50m Rifle 3 Positions.

== World record ==
Current world records held in men's 10 metre air rifle
Men	Qualification	600	Tevarit Majchacheep (THA); Denis Sokolov (RUS); Gagan Narang (IND); Gagan Narang (IND); Zhu Qinan (CHN)	January 27, 2000; March 1, 2008; May 5, 2008; May 16, 2008; September 22, 2011	Langkawi (MAS); Winterthur (SUI); Bangkok (THA); New Delhi (IND); Wrocław (POL)
Men	Final	703.8	Zhu Qinan (CHN) (600+103.8)	September 22, 2011	Wrocław (POL)
Junior Men	Individual	599	Cheon Min-ho (KOR); Zhu Qinan (CHN); Zhu Qinan (CHN); Sergey Richter (ISR)	April 24, 2004; August 16, 2004; October 30, 2004; May 16, 2009	Athens (GRE); Athens (GRE); Bangkok (THA); Munich (GER)
