= Nyantain Bayaraa =

Mongolian sport shooter (born 1991)

Personal information
- Nationality: Mongolia
- Born: 25 September 1991 (age 34)

Sport
- Country: Mongolia
- Sport: Shooting
Medal record
Men's shooting
Representing Mongolia
Asian Championships
| Bronze medal – third place | 2012 Doha | 10 m air rifle team |

Nyantain Bayaraa (Mongolian: Нянтайн Баяраа; born 25 September 1991) is a Mongolian sport shooter, born in Ulaanbaatar. He competed at the 2012 Summer Olympics in the Men's 10 metre air rifle, men's 50 m rifle prone and men's 50 m rifle 3 positions, finishing in 23rd, 33rd and 40th position respectively. He also competed at the 2014 and 2018 World Championships.
