= Midori Yajima =

Japanese sport shooter

Midori Yajima 谷島 緑
Personal information
- Native name: 谷島 緑
- National team: Japan
- Citizenship: Japan
- Born: 17 April 1979 (age 47) Ibaraki Prefecture, Japan
- Education: Chikusei City Kyowa Junior High School and Ibaraki Prefectural Makabe High School
- Height: 170 cm (5 ft 7 in)
- Weight: 77 kg (170 lb)

Sport
- Country: Japan
- Sport: Shooting
- Event(s): Men's 10 metre air rifle, Men's 50 metre rifle three positions, Men's 50 metre rifle prone
- Club: JSDF Physical Training School
Medal record
Men's shooting
Representing Japan
Asian Championships
Gold medal – first place	2012 Doha	50 m rifle prone
Bronze medal – third place	2007 Kuwait City	50 m rifle prone team
Bronze medal – third place	2012 Doha	50 m rifle prone team

Midori Yajima (born 17 April 1979) is a Japanese sport shooter. He competed at the 2012 Summer Olympics in the Men's 10 metre air rifle, finishing in 38th place, the men's 50 m rifle 3 positions, finishing in 39th place, and the men's 50 m rifle prone, finishing in 33rd place.
