= Ruslan Ismailov (sport shooter) =

Kyrgyztani sport shooter

Ruslan Ismailov (born 22 November 1986 in Frunze) is a Kyrgyzstani sport shooter. He competed at the 2008 and 2012 Summer Olympics. At the 2008 Summer Olympics he competed in the men's 10 metre air rifle, the 50 metre prone rifle and 50 metre rifle three positions (finishing in 39th, 54th and 48th respectively). At the 2012 Summer Olympics he competed in the men's 10 metre air rifle and the men's 50 metre rifle three positions (finishing in 21st and 40th).
