= Sanjeev Rajput =

Indian sport shooter

Master Chief Petty Officer Sanjeev Rajput
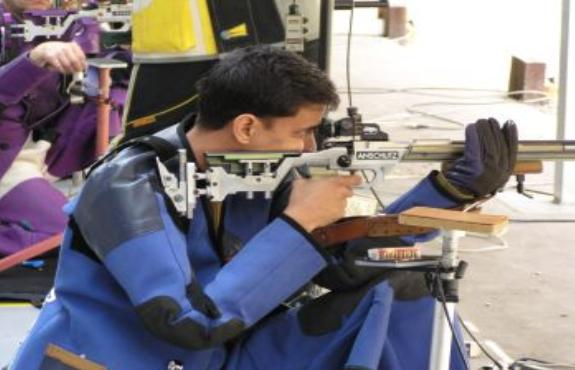

Personal information
- Nationality: Indian
- Citizenship: Indian
- Born: 5 January 1981 (age 45) Yamunanagar, Haryana, India
- Occupations: Sport shooter, MCPO II(Indian Navy)
- Military career
- Allegiance: India
- Branch: Indian Navy
- Service years: 1999–2014
- Rank: Master Chief Petty Officer 2nd Class
Medal record
Men's shooting
Representing India
ISSF World Cup
Gold medal – first place	2011 Changwon	50m Rifle 3 Positions
Silver medal – second place	2010 Sydney	10m Air Rifle
Silver medal – second place	2016 Baku	50m Rifle 3 Positions
Silver medal – second place	2019 Rio de Janeiro	50m Rifle 3 Positions
Gold medal – first place	2021 New Delhi	50m Rifle 3 Positions
Commonwealth Games
Gold medal – first place	2018 Gold Coast	50 m rifle 3 positions
Silver medal – second place	2014 Glasgow	50 m rifle 3 positions
Bronze medal – third place	2006 Melbourne	50 m rifle prone (singles)
Asian Games
Silver medal – second place	2018 Jakarta Palembang	50 m rifle 3 positions
Silver medal – second place	2010 Guangzhou	10 m air rifle team
Bronze medal – third place	2006 Doha	50 m rifle 3 positions team
Bronze medal – third place	2014 Incheon	10 m air rifle team
Asian Championships
Gold medal – first place	2012 Doha	50 m rifle 3 positions
Gold medal – first place	2012 Doha	50 m rifle 3 positions team
Silver medal – second place	2007 Kuwait City	50 m rifle prone team
Silver medal – second place	2007 Kuwait City	50 m rifle 3 positions
Silver medal – second place	2019 Doha	50 m rifle prone team
Commonwealth Championships
Gold medal – first place	2005 Melbourne	50 m rifle 3 positions pairs
Gold medal – first place	2010 Delhi	50 m rifle 3 positions
Gold medal – first place	2010 Delhi	50 m rifle 3 positions pairs
Gold medal – first place	2010 Delhi	50 m rifle 3 positions badge
Silver medal – second place	2010 Delhi	10 m air rifle
Silver medal – second place	2017 Brisbane	50m rifle 3 positions

Master Chief Petty Officer Sanjeev Rajput (5 January 1981) is an Arjuna Awardee Indian sport shooter from Yamuna Nagar, Haryana. He was a retired Junior Commissioned Officer in Indian Navy.

== Early life ==
Rajput was born on 5 January 1981 to Krishan Lal of Jagadhri. He went to SD Public School Jagadhri, Haryana. At the age of 18 he joined the Indian Navy as a sailor and left the same in 2014.

== Career ==
=== 2004 ===
He won three gold and a silver medal at SAF Games, Islamabad, 2004. At the national Championship Oct 2004 Sanjeev Rajput proves to be a new find by winning back to back finals with two different weapons on the final day of the National Championship at Reoti Ranges, Indore.

=== 2005–2006 ===
He won the 50m Free Rifle three-position and the 10m Air Rifle Champion of Champions events. He won a Team Gold in Commonwealth Shooting Championship, Melbourne in March 2005 in 50m Rifle 3 position event. He won the bronze medal in the Men's 50m Rifle Prone at the 2006 Commonwealth Games. He won a bronze medal in the 2006 Asian Games, Doha. He took part in 33rd National Games Guwahati from Services team and won 3 Gold and 1 Silver medal including individual Gold in 50m Rifle Prone and 3position event.

=== 2007–2008 ===
In 2007, he won the Olympic berth by making a New National Record of 1170/1200 in ISSF World Cup Fort Benning, USA, by breaking his own record of 1165. He won a second place in Asian Shooting Championship, Kuwait in December 2007 in 50m Rifle 3rd position and a team Bronze in the same event and a team silver in 50m Rifle Prone.

He contested in the men's 50 m rifle prone event at the 2008 Summer Olympics in Beijing, but failed to reach the finals. He also contests in the men's 50 m rifle three positions.

=== 2009–2010 ===
In July 2009, he won four gold and two silver medals from the SAG Shooting Championship, Dhaka. and a team Gold of Air rifle from Asian Air Gun Championship, Doha in December 2009.

In 2010 he won a double gold in 50m Rifle 3position event with the New Meet Record in Common Wealth Shooting Championship, Delhi and also a Silver in 10m Air rifle event. He won a silver medal in ISSF World Cup Sydney, 2010 in 10m Air Rifle. He finished 5th in 10m Air Rifle in ISSF World Cup Final in Oct 2010 in Munich, Germany. He also won a team silver in 10m Air rifle event in Asian Games Guangzhou, China. He was also Conferred with Arjuna Award in Aug 2010 and is also adjudged the Services Best Sports Person for the year 2009–2010 and was awarded the Trophy.

=== 2011–present ===
In 2011, he won gold medal in world cup held in Changwon, Korea. He also made a New National Record in the same event by again breaking his own record 3rd time. By winning this gold he became the third Indian to qualify for the London Olympics. He finished 8th place at the ISSF World Cup finals in Poland in his Pet event. He also won five gold and a silver medal in the 34th National Games Ranchi, Bihar. At the 2012 Summer Olympics Rajput could not make it to the finals of the men's 50-metre rifle three positions at the Royal Artillery Barracks.

At the 2014 Commonwealth Games in Glasgow, Sanjeev won a silver medal in the 50 m Rifle 3 positions event.

In 2016 he won his second ISSF world cup medal in 50 metres rifle 3 positions event at Baku, where he ended up with a silver medal.

At the Gold Coast CWG 2018, he won the gold medal in the 50m three positions event. In 2018 Asian Games, he won silver medal in men's 50 metres rifle 3 positions category.

In Shooting World Cup in Baku, Rajput won a silver medal in the 50m rifle three positions. He finished seventh in the qualification with a score of 1,167.

At the ISSF World Cup in Rio de Janeiro (August 2019), Rajput qualified for the final of the 50m three positions event with a score of 1180, going on to win the silver medal. With the podium finish, he also obtained a quota for the 2020 Tokyo Olympics.

== International medals won ==
- South Asian Federation Games 2004, Islamabad 2004 | 3 Gold Medal and 1 Silver Medal
- Australia Cup 2006, Melbourne 2006 | Bronze Medal 50M Rifle (3position)- Individual
- Asian Shooting Championship, Doha, Qatar 2007 | 2 Silver 50M Rifle (3position) - Individual & 50M Rifle (Prone) - Team, 1 Bronze 50M Rifle (3position) - Team
- Australia Cup, Sydney, 2008 – Gold medal in 50M Rifle (3postion) - Individual
- International Shooting Competition of Hannover, 2008 - 2 Gold Medals - 10M Air Rifle Individual & 10M Air Rifle Team
- 5th SAF Shooting Championship, Dhaka 2009 – 4 Gold Medals & 2 Silver Medal
- 3rd Asian Air Gun Championship, Doha 2009 – 1 Gold - 10M Air Rifle Individual
- 12th Asian Shooting Championship, 2012 – 2 Gold – 50m Rifle (3position) Individual & 50M Rifle (3position) Team
- His Highness Amir of Kuwait International Shooting Grand Prix, 2012- 1 Bronze Medal – 50M Rifle (Prone) Individual
- 6th Asian Air Gun Tehran, Iran 2013 – 2 Gold, 1 Silver & 1 Bronze Medal
