= Han Jin-seop =

South Korean sport shooter

- Hangul: 한진섭
- RR: Han Jinseop
- MR: Han Chinsŏp

Han Jin-seop
Medal record

Men's shooting

Representing South Korea

Asian Championships
Gold medal – first place	2012 Doha	50 m rifle prone team
Gold medal – first place	2015 Kuwait City	50 m rifle prone team
Gold medal – first place	2015 Kuwait City	50 m rifle 3 positions team
Silver medal – second place	2007 Kuwait City	50 m rifle 3 positions team
Silver medal – second place	2012 Doha	50 m rifle prone
Silver medal – second place	2012 Doha	50 m rifle 3 positions team
Silver medal – second place	2015 Kuwait City	50 m rifle prone

Han Jin-seop (Korean: 한진섭; born September 7, 1981) is a South Korean sport shooter. He has twice represented his country at the Olympics.

At the 2008 Summer Olympics, he finished 26th in the Men's 10 metre air rifle and 15th in the Men's 50 metre rifle 3 positions.

He competed at the 2012 Summer Olympics in the Men's 10 metre air rifle finishing in 32nd place, 9th in the Men's 50 metre rifle 3 positions and 6th in the Men's 50 metre rifle prone.
