= Toshikazu Yamashita =

Japanese sport shooter

Personal information
- Nationality: Japan
- Born: 21 February 1977 (age 49) Komatsushima, Tokushima, Japan
- Height: 1.70 m (5 ft 7 in)
- Weight: 70 kg (154 lb)

Sport
- Sport: Shooting
- Event(s): 10 m air rifle (AR40); 50 m rifle prone (FR60PR); 50 m rifle 3 positions (STR3X20)
- Club: Japan Self Defense Forces
Medal record
Men's shooting
Representing Japan
Asian Championships
Bronze medal – third place	2007 Kuwait City	10 m air rifle team
Bronze medal – third place	2007 Kuwait City	50 m rifle prone team
Bronze medal – third place	2012 Doha	50 m rifle prone team

Toshikazu Yamashita (山下 敏和, Yamashita Toshikazu; born February 21, 1977 in Komatsushima, Tokushima) is a Japanese sport shooter. Yamashita represented Japan at the 2008 Summer Olympics in Beijing, where he competed for all three rifle shooting events.

In his first event, 10 m air rifle, Yamashita was able to hit a total of 590 points within six attempts, finishing twenty-eighth in the qualifying rounds. Few days later, he placed eighteenth in the 50 m rifle prone, by one target behind Belarus' Petr Litvinchuk from the final attempt, with a total score of 593 points. In his third and last event, 50 m rifle 3 positions, Yamashita was able to shoot 399 targets in a prone position, 382 in standing, and 386 in kneeling, for a total score of 1,167 points, finishing only in sixteenth place.
