= Abdullah Hel Baki =

Bangladeshi sports shooter (born 1989)

Personal information
- Born: 1 August 1989 (age 36) Gazipur, Bangladesh
- Height: 1.67 m (5 ft 6 in)

Sport
- Sport: Sports shooting
- Event: 10 meter air rifle
- Coached by: Klavs Jørn Christensen
Medal record
Men's 10 m air rifle shooting
Representing Bangladesh
Event	1st	2nd	3rd
Commonwealth Games	0	2	1
Islamic Solidarity Games	1	0	0
South Asian Games	2	1	2
Total	3	3	3
Commonwealth Games
Silver medal – second place	2014 Glasgow	Individual
Silver medal – second place	2018 Gold Coast	Individual
Bronze medal – third place	2010 New Delhi	Pairs
Islamic Solidarity Games
Gold medal – first place	2017 Baku	Team
South Asian Games
Gold medal – first place	2004 Islamabad	Team
Gold medal – first place	2010 Dhaka	Team
Silver medal – second place	2016 Guwahati	Team
Bronze medal – third place	2019 Kathmandu	Team
Bronze medal – third place	2019 Kathmandu	Individual

Abdullah Hel Baki (born 1 August 1989) is a Bangladeshi sports shooter. He is a two-time Olympian who represented Bangladesh at the 2016 Rio Olympics and 2020 Tokyo Olympics, finishing 25th and 41st respectively in the men's 10 m air rifle event. He has won medals at the Islamic Solidarity Games, South Asian Games, and the Commonwealth Games, and was the flag bearer for Bangladesh at the 2018 Commonwealth Games.
