= Tevarit Majchacheep =

Thai sports shooter (born 1975)

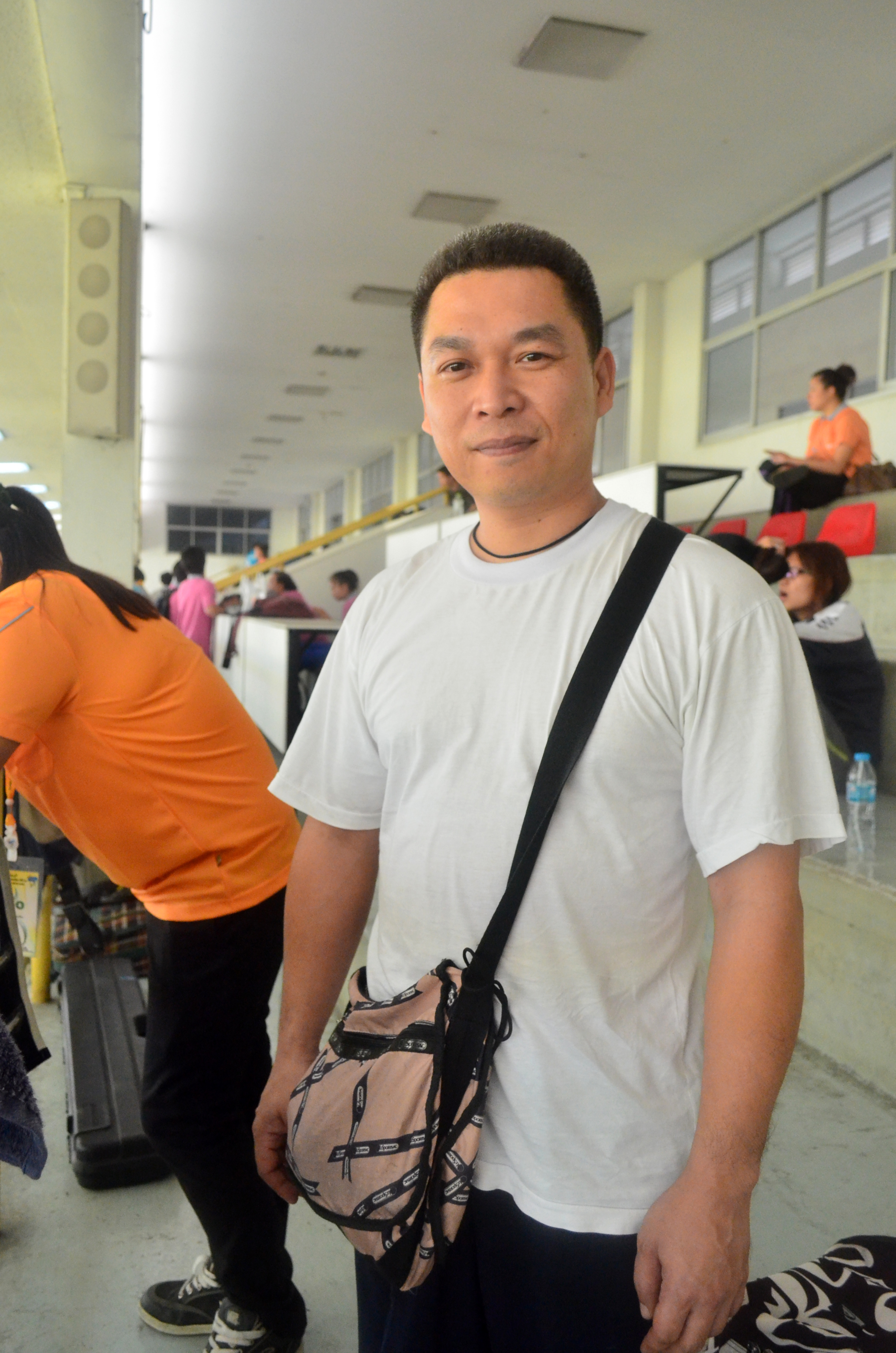
Tevarit Majchacheep

Tevarit Majchacheep (Thai: เทวฤทธิ์ มัจฉาชีพ; RTGS: Thewarit Matchachip; born February 22, 1975) in Thailand, was the first 10 m Air Rifle shooter to raise a world record to the maximum level, hitting the 0.5-millimeter dot with 60 consecutive shots. He was fairly unknown to the shooting community (although he had finished fifth at an ISSF World Cup) when he accomplished this at the 2000 Asian Championships in Langkawi. Since then, he has been a regular finalist at world-level competitions, but has so far failed to win any of the large championships.

Since Tevarit's 600, several women have reached the maximum 400 points of their shorter Air Rifle match, but he remained the sole holder of the men's world record until 2008.

== Olympic results ==
Event	2000	2004
50 metre rifle three positions	37th 1144	16th 1159
50 metre rifle prone	51st 580	36th 589
10 metre air rifle	18th 588	35th 587

== Records ==
Current world records held in 10 m Air Rifle
Men	Qualification	600	Tevarit Majchacheep (THA); Denis Sokolov (RUS); Gagan Narang (IND); Gagan Narang (IND); Zhu Qinan (CHN)	January 27, 2000; March 1, 2008; May 5, 2008; May 16, 2008; September 22, 2011	Langkawi (MAS); Winterthur (SUI); Bangkok (THA); New Delhi (IND); Wrocław (POL)
