= Varavut Majchacheep =

Thai sports shooter (born 1973)

Varavut Majchacheep (born June 8, 1973) is a Thai sport shooter. He competed in rifle shooting events at the 2000 Summer Olympics. He is the brother of Tevarit Majchacheep, who was also an Olympic shooter for Thailand.

== Olympic results ==
Event	2000
50 metre rifle three positions (men)	43rd
50 metre rifle prone (men)	T-47th
10 metre air rifle (men)	45th
