= Cao Yifei =

Chinese sport shooter (born 1988)

Personal information
- Born: May 20, 1988 (age 38) Jiaozuo, Henan, China
Medal record
Men's shooting
Representing China
Asian Championships
Gold medal – first place	2015 Kuwait City	10 m air rifle team
Silver medal – second place	2007 Kuwait City	10 m air rifle team
Silver medal – second place	2015 Kuwait City	10 m air rifle
Silver medal – second place	2015 Kuwait City	50 m rifle 3 positions team
Bronze medal – third place	2007 Kuwait City	10 m air rifle
Universiade
Silver medal – second place	2011 Shenzhen	10 m air rifle team
Silver medal – second place	2011 Shenzhen	50 m rifle prone

Cao Yifei (born May 20, 1988 in Jiaozuo, Henan) is a male Chinese sports shooter, who competed for Team China at the 2008 Summer Olympics.

== Major performances ==
- 2005 National Games – 1st 50 m small-bore rifle prone;
- 2006 World Championships Youth Group – 1st 50 m small-bore rifle 3x40;
- 2007 National Intercity Games – 1st 50 m small-bore rifle prone/3x40

== Records ==
- 2005 National Games – 702.7, 50 m small-bore rifle prone (NR)
