= Yuriy Yurkov =

Kazakhstani sport shooter (born 1983)

Personal information
- Nationality: Kazakhstan
- Born: 11 March 1983 (age 43) Shymkent, Kazakh SSR, Soviet Union
- Height: 1.75 m (5 ft 9 in)
- Weight: 70 kg (154 lb)

Sport
- Sport: Shooting
- Event(s): 10 m air rifle (AR40); 50 m rifle prone (FR60PR); 50 m rifle 3 positions (STR3X20)
- Club: Dynamo Shymkent
Medal record
Men's shooting
Representing Kazakhstan
Asian Championships
Gold medal – first place	2023 Changwon	50 m rifle prone team
Bronze medal – third place	2015 Kuwait City	50 m rifle 3 positions team
Bronze medal – third place	2025 Shymkent	50 m rifle prone team
Asian Airgun Championships
Gold medal – first place	2021 Shymkent	10 m air rifle team

Yuriy Yurkov (Kazakh: Юрий Александрович Юрков; born March 11, 1983, in Shymkent) is a Kazakhstani sport shooter. Yurkov represented Kazakhstan at the 2008 Summer Olympics in Beijing, where he competed for all three rifle shooting events.

In his first event, 10 m air rifle, Yurkov was able to hit a total of 586 points within six attempts, finishing forty-second in the qualifying rounds. Few days later, he placed forty-second again this time in the 50 m rifle prone, by one target behind Austria's Christian Planer from the second attempt, with a total score of 588 points. In his third and last event, 50 m rifle 3 positions, Yurkov was able to shoot 395 targets in a prone position, 382 in standing, and 385 in kneeling, for a total score of 1,162 points, finishing only in twenty-seventh place.
