= Shooting at the 2002 Asian Games =

- Venue: Changwon International Shooting Range
- Dates: 2–8 October 2002
- Competitors: 407 from 34 nations

Shooting sports at the 2002 Asian Games was held in Changwon International Shooting Range, Changwon, South Korea between 2 and 8 October 2002.

== Schedule ==
●	1st day	●	Final day	Q	Qualification	F	Final

Event↓/Date →	2nd Wed		3rd Thu		4th Fri		5th Sat		6th Sun		7th Mon		8th Tue	
Men's 10 m air pistol			Q	F										
Men's 10 m air pistol team			●											
Men's 25 m center fire pistol											●			
Men's 25 m center fire pistol team											●			
Men's 25 m rapid fire pistol							Q		Q	F				
Men's 25 m rapid fire pistol team							●		●					
Men's 25 m standard pistol													●	
Men's 25 m standard pistol team													●	
Men's 50 m pistol	Q	F												
Men's 50 m pistol team	●													
Men's 10 m air rifle	Q	F												
Men's 10 m air rifle team	●													
Men's 50 m rifle prone							Q	F						
Men's 50 m rifle prone team							●							
Men's 50 m rifle 3 positions											Q	F		
Men's 50 m rifle 3 positions team											●			
Men's 10 m running target			Q		Q	F								
Men's 10 m running target team			●		●									
Men's trap	Q		Q	F										
Men's trap team	●		●											
Men's double trap							Q	F						
Men's double trap team							●							
Men's skeet											Q		Q	F
Men's skeet team											●		●	
Women's 10 m air pistol			Q	F										
Women's 10 m air pistol team			●											
Women's 25 m pistol					Q	F								
Women's 25 m pistol team					●									
Women's 10 m air rifle	Q	F												
Women's 10 m air rifle team	●													
Women's 50 m rifle prone					●									
Women's 50 m rifle prone team					●									
Women's 50 m rifle 3 positions									Q	F				
Women's 50 m rifle 3 positions team									●					
Women's 10 m running target									●					
Women's 10 m running target team									●					
Women's trap	Q	F												
Women's trap team	●													
Women's double trap							●							
Women's double trap team							●							
Women's skeet											Q	F		
Women's skeet team											●			

== Medalists ==
=== Men ===
Event	Gold	Silver	Bronze
10 m air pistol	Tan Zongliang; China	Kim Jong-su; North Korea	Jin Jong-oh; South Korea
10 m air pistol team	China; Tan Zongliang; Wang Yifu; Xu Dan	North Korea; Kim Hyon-ung; Kim Jong-su; Ryu Myong-yon	Kazakhstan; Vladimir Guchsha; Vladimir Issachenko; Rashid Yunusmetov
25 m center fire pistol	Kim Jong-su; North Korea	Lee Sang-hak; South Korea	Nguyễn Mạnh Tường; Vietnam
25 m center fire pistol team	China; Chen Yongqiang; Jin Yongde; Liu Yadong	North Korea; Kim Hyon-ung; Kim Jong-su; Ryu Myong-yon	South Korea; Jang Dae-kyu; Lee Sang-hak; Park Byung-taek
25 m rapid fire pistol	Liu Guohui; China	Lee Sang-hak; South Korea	Chen Yongqiang; China
25 m rapid fire pistol team	China; Chen Yongqiang; Ji Haiping; Liu Guohui	South Korea; Kang Hyung-chul; Lee Sang-hak; Lee Young-hoon	North Korea; Kang Chang-sik; Kim Hyon-ung; Kim Myong-sop
25 m standard pistol	Opas Ruengpanyawut; Thailand	Liu Guohui; China	Park Byung-taek; South Korea
25 m standard pistol team	China; Jin Yongde; Liu Guohui; Liu Yadong	South Korea; Kim Sung-jun; Lee Sang-hak; Park Byung-taek	North Korea; Kim Hyon-ung; Kim Jong-su; Ryu Myong-yon
50 m pistol	Wang Yifu; China	Tan Zongliang; China	Kim Jong-su; North Korea
50 m pistol team	China; Tan Zongliang; Wang Yifu; Xu Dan	South Korea; Jin Jong-oh; Kim Seon-il; Lee Sang-do	North Korea; Kim Hyon-ung; Kim Jong-su; Ryu Myong-yon
10 m air rifle	Li Jie; China	Zhang Fu; China	Naoki Isobe; Japan
10 m air rifle team	China; Cai Yalin; Li Jie; Zhang Fu	Japan; Naoki Isobe; Takayuki Okada; Masaru Yanagida	South Korea; Kim Byung-eun; Lee Woo-jeong; Lim Young-sueb
50 m rifle prone	Sergey Belyayev; Kazakhstan	Igor Pirekeýew; Turkmenistan	Yao Ye; China
50 m rifle prone team	South Korea; Choi Byung-woo; Kang Seung-kyun; Nam Hyung-jin	China; Qiu Jian; Wang Weiyi; Yao Ye	Kazakhstan; Sergey Belyayev; Vitaliy Dovgun; Yuriy Melsitov
50 m rifle 3 positions	Igor Pirekeýew; Turkmenistan	Yao Ye; China	Park Bong-duk; South Korea
50 m rifle 3 positions team	China; Cai Yalin; Qiu Jian; Yao Ye	South Korea; Cha Young-chul; Nam Hyung-jin; Park Bong-duk	Kazakhstan; Sergey Belyayev; Vitaliy Dovgun; Yuriy Melsitov
10 m running target	Niu Zhiyuan; China	Her Dae-kyung; South Korea	Yang Ling; China
10 m running target team	China; Niu Zhiyuan; Yang Ling; Zeng Guobin	South Korea; Cho Se-jong; Her Dae-kyung; Hwang Young-do	Kazakhstan; Sergey Duzev; Andrey Gurov; Rustam Seitov
Trap	Li Hui; China	Zhang Yongjie; China	Jethro Dionisio; Philippines
Trap team	China; Huang Lixin; Li Hui; Zhang Yongjie	India; Manavjit Singh Sandhu; Mansher Singh; Anwer Sultan	Philippines; Eric Ang; Jethro Dionisio; Jaime Recio
Double trap	Chen Shih-wei; Chinese Taipei	Shih Wei-tin; Chinese Taipei	Jung Yoon-kyun; South Korea
Double trap team	South Korea; Jung Yoon-kyun; Kim Byoung-jun; Park Jung-hwan	China; Hu Binyuan; Li Bo; Li Shuangchun	Chinese Taipei; Chen Shih-wei; Lin Chin-hsien; Shih Wei-tin
Skeet	Masoud Saleh Al-Athba; Qatar	Jin Di; China	Alexey Ponomarev; Kazakhstan
Skeet team	Qatar; Masoud Saleh Al-Athba; Nasser Al-Attiyah; Ahmed Al-Kuwari	Kazakhstan; Sergey Kolos; Alexey Ponomarev; Sergey Yakshin	China; Chen Dong; Jin Di; Zhang Kaiyan

=== Women ===
Event	Gold	Silver	Bronze
10 m air pistol	Tao Luna; China	Ren Jie; China	Park Jung-hee; South Korea
10 m air pistol team	China; Chen Ying; Ren Jie; Tao Luna	Kazakhstan; Zauresh Baibussinova; Galina Belyayeva; Yuliya Bondareva	South Korea; Gang Eun-ra; Ko Jin-sook; Park Jung-hee
25 m pistol	Chen Ying; China	Tao Luna; China	Otryadyn Gündegmaa; Mongolia
25 m pistol team	China; Chen Ying; Li Duihong; Tao Luna	Japan; Michiko Fukushima; Yukari Konishi; Yuki Yoshida	Kazakhstan; Zauresh Baibussinova; Galina Belyayeva; Yuliya Bondareva
10 m air rifle	Zhao Yinghui; China	Gao Jing; China	Park Un-kyong; South Korea
10 m air rifle team	China; Du Li; Gao Jing; Zhao Yinghui	India; Anjali Bhagwat; Deepali Deshpande; Suma Shirur	South Korea; Kim Hyung-mi; Park Un-kyong; Seo Sun-hwa
50 m rifle prone	Olga Dovgun; Kazakhstan	Lee Mi-kyung; South Korea	Elena Kostyukova; Kyrgyzstan
50 m rifle prone team	South Korea; Kong Hyun-ah; Lee Mi-kyung; Lee Sun-min	China; Gao Jing; Shan Hong; Wang Xian	Kazakhstan; Olga Dovgun; Galina Korchma; Varvara Kovalenko
50 m rifle 3 positions	Du Li; China	Olga Dovgun; Kazakhstan	Wang Xian; China
50 m rifle 3 positions team	China; Du Li; Shan Hong; Wang Xian	South Korea; Kim Jung-mi; Kong Hyun-ah; Lee Sun-min	Kazakhstan; Olga Dovgun; Galina Korchma; Varvara Kovalenko
10 m running target	Xu Xuan; China	Natalya Kovalenko; Kazakhstan	Wang Xia; China
10 m running target team	China; Qiu Wei; Wang Xia; Xu Xuan	South Korea; Kim Deuk-nam; Kim Moon-sun; Park Jung-yun	Iran; Lida Fariman; Elham Hashemi; Raheleh Kheirollahzadeh
Trap	Gao E China	Pak Yong-hui; North Korea	Ri Hye-gyong; North Korea
Trap team	North Korea; Kim Mun-hwa; Pak Yong-hui; Ri Hye-gyong	China; Gao E Ma Huike; Wang Yujin	Japan; Yoshie Ishibashi; Yuki Kurisaki; Taeko Takeba
Double trap	Lee Sang-hee; South Korea	Wang Jinglin; China	Zhang Yafei; China
Double trap team	China; Ding Hongping; Wang Jinglin; Zhang Yafei	South Korea; Kim Saet-byeol; Lee Sang-hee; Son Hye-kyoung	Japan; Yuka Arai; Megumi Inoue; Miyoko Matsushima
Skeet	Son Hye-kyoung; South Korea	Shi Hongyan; China	Kim Yeun-hee; South Korea
Skeet team	South Korea; Kim Yeun-hee; Kwak Yu-hyun; Son Hye-kyoung	China; Chen Zhenru; Shi Hongyan; Wei Ning	Chinese Taipei; Chou Tsai-jung; Hsieh Ming-yi; Huang Shih-ting

== Medal table ==
Rank	Nation	Gold	Silver	Bronze	Total
1	China (CHN)	27	16	7	50
2	South Korea (KOR)	6	12	11	29
3	Kazakhstan (KAZ)	2	4	8	14
4	North Korea (PRK)	2	4	5	11
5	Qatar (QAT)	2	0	0	2
6	Chinese Taipei (TPE)	1	1	2	4
7	Turkmenistan (TKM)	1	1	0	2
8	Thailand (THA)	1	0	0	1
9	Japan (JPN)	0	2	3	5
10	India (IND)	0	2	0	2
11	Philippines (PHI)	0	0	2	2
12	Iran (IRI)	0	0	1	1
12	Kyrgyzstan (KGZ)	0	0	1	1
12	Mongolia (MGL)	0	0	1	1
12	Vietnam (VIE)	0	0	1	1
Totals (15 entries)		42	42	42	126

== Participating nations ==
A total of 407 athletes from 34 nations competed in shooting at the 2002 Asian Games:

- Afghanistan (1)
- Bahrain (6)
- Bangladesh (6)
- China (47)
- Chinese Taipei (17)
- Hong Kong (6)
- India (31)
- Iran (7)
- Japan (26)
- Jordan (1)
- Kazakhstan (23)
- Kuwait (15)
- Kyrgyzstan (8)
- Lebanon (1)
- Macau (4)
- Malaysia (7)
- Maldives (1)
- Mongolia (11)
- Nepal (4)
- North Korea (22)
- Oman (12)
- Pakistan (13)
- Philippines (8)
- Qatar (25)
- Saudi Arabia (2)
- Singapore (3)
- South Korea (53)
- Sri Lanka (2)
- Tajikistan (3)
- Thailand (17)
- Turkmenistan (2)
- United Arab Emirates (12)
- Uzbekistan (6)
- Vietnam (5)
