= Shooting at the 2002 Asian Games – Men's 25 metre standard pistol team =

Men's 25 metre standard pistol team at the 2002 Asian Games
- Venue: Changwon International Shooting Range
- Dates: 8 October 2002
- Competitors: 39 from 13 nations

Medalists
gold medal	China; Jin Yongde, Liu Guohui, Liu Yadong
silver medal	South Korea; Kim Sung-jun, Lee Sang-hak, Park Byung-taek
bronze medal	North Korea; Kim Hyon-ung, Kim Jong-su, Ryu Myong-yon

The men's 25 metre standard pistol team competition at the 2002 Asian Games in Busan, South Korea was held on 8 October at the Changwon International Shooting Range.

== Schedule ==
All times are Korea Standard Time (UTC+09:00)

Date	Time	Event
Tuesday, 8 October 2002	09:00	Final

== Records ==
Prior to this competition, the existing world, Asian and Games records were as follows.

World Record	Soviet Union	1725	Osijek, Yugoslavia	10 September 1985
Asian Record	China	1719	Beijing, China	20 September 1991
Games Record	China	1714	Hiroshima, Japan	12 October 1994

== Results ==
Legend

- DNS — Did not start

Rank	Team	150 Sec		20 Sec		10 Sec		Total	Notes
Rank	Team	1	2	1	2	1	2	Total	Notes
1st place, gold medalist(s)	China (CHN)	289	292	286	286	285	286	1724	AR
	Jin Yongde	97	99	93	94	94	94	571	
	Liu Guohui	97	96	98	97	94	95	577	
	Liu Yadong	95	97	95	95	97	97	576	
2nd place, silver medalist(s)	South Korea (KOR)	290	295	285	291	285	275	1721	
	Kim Sung-jun	99	99	95	97	95	91	576	
	Lee Sang-hak	95	99	95	97	92	91	569	
	Park Byung-taek	96	97	95	97	98	93	576	
3rd place, bronze medalist(s)	North Korea (PRK)	294	294	283	286	282	273	1712	
	Kim Hyon-ung	96	99	93	96	97	90	571	
	Kim Jong-su	100	96	95	95	93	92	571	
	Ryu Myong-yon	98	99	95	95	92	91	570	
4	Kazakhstan (KAZ)	284	289	280	281	282	275	1691	
	Vladimir Issachenko	96	96	99	94	91	90	566	
	Igor Shmotkin	95	97	88	94	95	93	562	
	Vladimir Vokhmyanin	93	96	93	93	96	92	563	
4	Thailand (THA)	289	290	284	280	282	266	1691	
	Nopparat Kulton	94	94	96	91	92	89	556	
	Jakkrit Panichpatikum	97	99	89	95	93	83	556	
	Opas Ruengpanyawut	98	97	99	94	97	94	579	
6	Vietnam (VIE)	287	291	283	285	267	274	1687	
	Nguyễn Mạnh Tường	96	97	93	94	84	94	558	
	Nguyễn Trung Hiếu	95	99	94	93	92	84	557	
	Phạm Cao Sơn	96	95	96	98	91	96	572	
7	India (IND)	291	285	283	283	270	268	1680	
	Samaresh Jung	99	95	95	94	84	84	551	
	Ved Prakash Pilaniya	97	95	95	93	90	91	561	
	Jaspal Rana	95	95	93	96	96	93	568	
8	Japan (JPN)	283	288	284	278	270	273	1676	
	Teruyoshi Akiyama	95	97	94	94	94	91	565	
	Shuji Tazawa	94	95	94	90	87	93	553	
	Shoichi Uenosono	94	96	96	94	89	89	558	
9	Uzbekistan (UZB)	279	288	279	281	269	275	1671	
	Dilshod Mukhtarov	95	97	94	94	94	94	568	
	Enver Osmanov	92	97	96	94	92	89	560	
	Sergey Vozmishchev	92	94	89	93	83	92	543	
9	Pakistan (PAK)	289	277	276	279	278	272	1671	
	Irshad Ali	97	94	92	90	93	90	556	
	Zahid Ali	94	90	93	94	92	95	558	
	Mustaqeem Shah	98	93	91	95	93	87	557	
11	Hong Kong (HKG)	286	279	272	274	256	265	1632	
	Lee Siu Wah	95	97	92	90	83	86	543	
	Li Hao Jian	96	93	96	93	87	93	558	
	Man Kin Hung	95	89	84	91	86	86	531	
12	Oman (OMA)	276	272	268	271	244	261	1592	
	Salem Al-Awaisi	96	92	94	89	87	87	545	
	Khailfa Al-Hanai	86	86	84	88	66	83	493	
	Said Al-Hasani	94	94	90	94	91	91	554	
—	Kyrgyzstan (KGZ)							DNS	
	Vladimir Grigoriev							DNS	
	Dmitru Kuznetsov	95	95	94	90	93	92	559	
	Yuri Melentiev	96	94	92	89	91	92	554	
