= Shooting at the 2002 Asian Games – Men's 25 metre standard pistol =

Men's 25 metre standard pistol at the 2002 Asian Games
- Venue: Changwon International Shooting Range
- Dates: 8 October 2002
- Competitors: 47 from 19 nations

Medalists
gold medal	Opas Ruengpanyawut	Thailand
silver medal	Liu Guohui	China
bronze medal	Park Byung-taek	South Korea

The men's 25 metre standard pistol competition at the 2002 Asian Games in Busan, South Korea was held on 8 October at the Changwon International Shooting Range.

== Schedule ==
All times are Korea Standard Time (UTC+09:00)

Date	Time	Event
Tuesday, 8 October 2002	09:00	Final

== Records ==
Prior to this competition, the existing world, Asian and Games records were as follows.

World Record	Erich Buljung (USA)	584	Caracas, Venezuela	20 August 1983
Asian Record	Wang Runxi (CHN)	578	Beijing, China	20 September 1991
Games Record	Wang Hui (CHN)	575	Beijing, China	30 September 1990

== Results ==
Legend

- DNS — Did not start

Rank	Athlete	150 Sec		20 Sec		10 Sec		Total	S-off	Notes
Rank	Athlete	1	2	1	2	1	2	Total	S-off	Notes
1st place, gold medalist(s)	Opas Ruengpanyawut (THA)	98	97	99	94	97	94	579		AR
2nd place, silver medalist(s)	Liu Guohui (CHN)	97	96	98	97	94	95	577		
3rd place, bronze medalist(s)	Park Byung-taek (KOR)	96	97	95	97	98	93	576	143	
4	Liu Yadong (CHN)	95	97	95	95	97	97	576	141	
5	Kim Sung-jun (KOR)	99	99	95	97	95	91	576	130	
6	Phạm Cao Sơn (VIE)	96	95	96	98	91	96	572		
7	Jin Yongde (CHN)	97	99	93	94	94	94	571		
8	Kim Jong-su (PRK)	100	96	95	95	93	92	571		
9	Kim Hyon-ung (PRK)	96	99	93	96	97	90	571		
10	Ryu Myong-yon (PRK)	98	99	95	95	92	91	570		
11	Lee Sang-hak (KOR)	95	99	95	97	92	91	569		
12	Dilshod Mukhtarov (UZB)	95	97	94	94	94	94	568		
12	Jaspal Rana (IND)	95	95	93	96	96	93	568		
14	Sergey Babikov (TJK)	96	96	97	94	92	92	567		
15	Vladimir Issachenko (KAZ)	96	96	99	94	91	90	566		
16	Teruyoshi Akiyama (JPN)	95	97	94	94	94	91	565		
17	Vladimir Vokhmyanin (KAZ)	93	96	93	93	96	92	563		
18	Igor Shmotkin (KAZ)	95	97	88	94	95	93	562		
19	Ved Prakash Pilaniya (IND)	97	95	95	93	90	91	561		
20	Enver Osmanov (UZB)	92	97	96	94	92	89	560		
21	Dmitru Kuznetsov (KGZ)	95	95	94	90	93	92	559		
22	Zahid Ali (PAK)	94	90	93	94	92	95	558		
22	Nguyễn Mạnh Tường (VIE)	96	97	93	94	84	94	558		
22	Li Hao Jian (HKG)	96	93	96	93	87	93	558		
22	Shoichi Uenosono (JPN)	94	96	96	94	89	89	558		
26	Mustaqeem Shah (PAK)	98	93	91	95	93	87	557		
26	Nguyễn Trung Hiếu (VIE)	95	99	94	93	92	84	557		
28	Irshad Ali (PAK)	97	94	92	90	93	90	556		
28	Nopparat Kulton (THA)	94	94	96	91	92	89	556		
28	Riaz Khan (QAT)	95	98	90	95	89	89	556		
28	Jakkrit Panichpatikum (THA)	97	99	89	95	93	83	556		
32	Zafer Al-Qahtani (QAT)	91	96	87	99	92	90	555		
33	Yuri Melentiev (KGZ)	96	94	92	89	91	92	554		
33	Said Al-Hasani (OMA)	94	94	90	94	91	91	554		
35	Shuji Tazawa (JPN)	94	95	94	90	87	93	553		
36	Samaresh Jung (IND)	99	95	95	94	84	84	551		
37	Chiu Kin Chong (MAC)	91	95	89	95	94	86	550		
38	Nathaniel Padilla (PHI)	93	95	97	91	87	85	548		
39	Chang Yi-ning (TPE)	94	94	92	88	89	88	545		
39	Salem Al-Awaisi (OMA)	96	92	94	89	87	87	545		
41	Sergey Vozmishchev (UZB)	92	94	89	93	83	92	543		
41	Lee Siu Wah (HKG)	95	97	92	90	83	86	543		
43	Man Kin Hung (HKG)	95	89	84	91	86	86	531		
44	Khailfa Al-Hanai (OMA)	86	86	84	88	66	83	493		
—	Vladimir Grigoriev (KGZ)							DNS		
—	Adel Al-Asad (BRN)							DNS		
—	Khalid Ahmed Mohamed (BRN)							DNS		
