= Shooting at the 2002 Asian Games – Men's 50 metre rifle three positions =

Men's 50 metre rifle 3 positions at the 2002 Asian Games
- Venue: Changwon International Shooting Range
- Dates: 7 October 2002
- Competitors: 40 from 15 nations

Medalists
gold medal	Igor Pirekeýew	Turkmenistan
silver medal	Yao Ye	China
bronze medal	Park Bong-duk	South Korea

The men's 50 metre rifle three positions competition at the 2002 Asian Games in Busan, South Korea was held on 7 October at the Changwon International Shooting Range.

The men's 50 metre rifle three positions consists of the prone, standing and kneeling positions, fired in that order, with 3×40 shots for men.

The men's match has separate commands and times for each position, giving each shooter 45 minutes to complete the prone part, 75 minutes for the standing part, and 60 minutes for the kneeling part, including sighting shots for each part.

The top eight competitors reach the final, where the score zones are divided into tenths, giving up to 10.9 points for each shot. The men's final consists of ten shots from the standing position, with a time limit of 75 seconds per shot. The competition is won by the shooter who reaches the highest aggregate score (qualification + final, maximum 1309.0).

== Schedule ==
All times are Korea Standard Time (UTC+09:00)

Date	Time	Event
Monday, 7 October 2002	09:00	Qualification
Monday, 7 October 2002	15:00	Final

== Records ==
Prior to this competition, the existing world, Asian and Games records were as follows.

Qualification
World Record	Rajmond Debevec (SLO)	1186	Munich, Germany	29 August 1992
Asian Record	Sergey Belyayev (KAZ)	1175	Atlanta, United States	27 July 1996
Games Record	Lee Eun-chul (KOR)	1161	Beijing, China	29 September 1990
Final
World Record	Rajmond Debevec (SLO)	1287.9	Munich, Germany	29 August 1992
Asian Record	Sergey Belyayev (KAZ)	1272.3	Atlanta, United States	27 July 1996
Games Record	Ning Lijia (CHN)	1256.9	Bangkok, Thailand	11 December 1998

== Results ==
=== Qualification ===
Rank	Athlete	Prone				Standing				Kneeling				Total	Notes
Rank	Athlete	1	2	3	4	1	2	3	4	1	2	3	4	Total	Notes
1	Igor Pirekeýew (TKM)	100	100	99	100	99	94	95	95	98	98	100	97	1175	GR
2	Park Bong-duk (KOR)	98	100	98	99	98	94	94	95	96	95	95	98	1160	
3	Yao Ye (CHN)	99	99	99	99	95	96	96	95	96	97	95	94	1160	
4	Vyacheslav Skoromnov (UZB)	97	99	100	98	92	95	97	97	96	96	95	97	1159	
5	Vitaliy Dovgun (KAZ)	98	98	97	98	94	95	97	92	100	99	94	97	1159	
6	Nam Hyung-jin (KOR)	98	99	100	98	97	92	95	92	99	96	97	96	1159	
7	Qiu Jian (CHN)	99	99	100	98	93	94	96	94	99	97	96	92	1157	
8	Cai Yalin (CHN)	100	99	96	99	97	93	94	96	94	96	98	93	1155	
9	Yuriy Melsitov (KAZ)	97	99	99	99	89	94	93	94	96	99	96	97	1152	
10	Aleksandr Babchenko (KGZ)	100	98	96	99	93	91	95	93	95	99	95	97	1151	
10	Cha Young-chul (KOR)	98	98	99	97	94	89	97	94	98	96	97	94	1151	
12	Hilal Al-Rashidi (OMA)	96	99	98	97	89	96	95	95	94	96	96	98	1149	
12	Tevarit Majchacheep (THA)	96	99	95	96	96	98	93	94	92	94	100	96	1149	
14	Tachir Ismailov (KGZ)	99	98	99	99	95	94	96	93	96	92	89	97	1147	
15	Emran Zakaria (MAS)	97	98	96	100	94	93	94	92	94	95	96	97	1146	
15	Toshikazu Yamashita (JPN)	98	99	100	97	96	91	85	94	97	98	96	95	1146	
15	Ivan Shakhov (UZB)	96	96	99	98	95	96	92	97	97	93	95	92	1146	
18	Tsedevdorjiin Mönkh-Erdene (MGL)	99	99	94	97	94	97	90	92	95	97	95	94	1143	
19	Yuri Lomov (KGZ)	98	100	97	97	92	92	93	95	91	97	92	98	1142	
19	Subbaiah Airira Pemmaiah (IND)	99	100	97	99	94	95	91	92	95	96	96	88	1142	
21	Sergey Belyayev (KAZ)	98	98	99	98	88	94	91	90	97	96	93	99	1141	
22	Varavut Majchacheep (THA)	95	97	98	100	94	96	94	91	92	97	93	93	1140	
23	Mohd Hameleay Mutalib (MAS)	96	96	95	98	96	93	88	94	96	98	96	93	1139	
23	Naoki Isobe (JPN)	97	99	98	98	92	95	95	95	93	92	95	90	1139	
25	Masaru Yanagida (JPN)	98	99	98	98	95	94	94	88	96	93	94	91	1138	
26	Nergüin Enkhbaatar (MGL)	98	99	99	98	97	90	92	94	92	95	88	95	1137	
27	Sabki Mohd Din (MAS)	99	97	98	98	94	91	91	94	95	91	92	95	1135	
28	Dadallah Al-Bulushi (OMA)	98	98	99	99	89	91	88	93	97	97	93	91	1133	
29	Charan Singh (IND)	95	96	94	98	95	96	92	89	93	95	94	95	1132	
29	Sergey Kharitonov (UZB)	98	99	97	98	91	92	88	88	94	97	97	93	1132	
29	Thambukthira Palangappa (IND)	96	95	96	94	92	95	94	90	95	96	97	92	1132	
29	Abdulnasser Al-Shaiba (QAT)	100	99	96	96	93	94	90	90	92	95	95	92	1132	
33	Olzodyn Enkhsaikhan (MGL)	97	98	97	97	97	92	91	89	92	93	90	95	1128	
34	Abdulla Al-Ahmad (QAT)	99	98	99	96	87	86	97	89	97	94	89	95	1126	
35	Nutchavapong Kuntawong (THA)	98	97	98	98	91	93	89	93	87	91	93	94	1122	
36	Dawood Muhammad Zai (PAK)	95	98	98	98	91	90	94	92	88	92	90	92	1118	
37	Mohammed Al-Hanai (OMA)	96	97	95	97	85	90	94	88	95	94	90	92	1113	
38	Ayaz Tahir (PAK)	98	96	97	95	90	87	91	87	94	89	91	96	1111	
39	Mohammad Uzzaman (BAN)	98	95	97	93	90	92	88	87	90	89	89	89	1097	
40	Anwer Zaman (BAN)	93	94	97	91	91	89	83	80	87	88	93	91	1077	

=== Final ===
Rank	Athlete	Qual.	Final											Total	S-off	Notes
Rank	Athlete	Qual.	1	2	3	4	5	6	7	8	9	10	Total	Total	S-off	Notes
1st place, gold medalist(s)	Igor Pirekeýew (TKM)	1175	7.9	8.2	9.5	9.7	9.8	8.4	10.2	9.1	9.0	10.1	91.9	1266.9		GR
2nd place, silver medalist(s)	Yao Ye (CHN)	1160	10.2	9.7	10.6	9.8	10.0	9.7	9.5	10.7	10.1	10.2	100.5	1260.5		
3rd place, bronze medalist(s)	Park Bong-duk (KOR)	1160	9.7	9.0	10.2	10.2	8.6	9.8	8.4	10.7	10.2	10.0	96.8	1256.8		
4	Nam Hyung-jin (KOR)	1159	8.7	9.9	9.0	9.6	8.8	9.8	10.6	10.5	10.1	10.4	97.4	1256.4		
5	Vyacheslav Skoromnov (UZB)	1159	8.8	10.7	9.0	10.1	9.2	9.3	8.9	10.0	10.5	9.5	96.0	1255.0		
6	Qiu Jian (CHN)	1157	10.2	9.3	9.5	9.4	10.1	10.0	10.3	8.1	10.7	9.9	97.5	1254.5		
7	Vitaliy Dovgun (KAZ)	1159	8.4	9.8	8.4	8.8	9.0	10.3	10.6	9.8	9.8	9.2	94.1	1253.1		
8	Cai Yalin (CHN)	1155	9.6	10.0	10.4	9.6	9.3	9.5	10.0	8.3	10.1	9.7	96.5	1251.5		
