= Shooting at the 2002 Asian Games – Men's 50 metre rifle prone =

Men's 50 metre rifle prone at the 2002 Asian Games
- Venue: Changwon International Shooting Range
- Dates: 5 October 2002
- Competitors: 51 from 21 nations

Medalists
gold medal	Sergey Belyayev	Kazakhstan
silver medal	Igor Pirekeýew	Turkmenistan
bronze medal	Yao Ye	China

The men's 50 metre rifle prone competition at the 2002 Asian Games in Busan, South Korea was held on 5 October at the Changwon International Shooting Range.

== Schedule ==
All times are Korea Standard Time (UTC+09:00)

Date	Time	Event
Saturday, 5 October 2002	09:00	Qualification
Saturday, 5 October 2002	13:00	Final

== Records ==
Prior to this competition, the existing world, Asian and Games records were as follows.

Qualification
World Record	Viatcheslav Botchkarev (URS)	600	Zagreb, Yugoslavia	13 July 1989
Asian Record	Sergey Belyayev (KAZ)	599	Hiroshima, Japan	11 October 1994
Games Record	Sergey Belyayev (KAZ)	599	Hiroshima, Japan	11 October 1994
Final
World Record	Christian Klees (GER)	704.8	Atlanta, United States	25 July 1996
Asian Record	Sergey Belyayev (KAZ)	703.3	Atlanta, United States	25 July 1996
Games Record	Sergey Belyayev (KAZ)	702.1	Hiroshima, Japan	11 October 1994

== Results ==
=== Qualification ===
Rank	Athlete	Series						Total	Notes
Rank	Athlete	1	2	3	4	5	6	Total	Notes
1	Igor Pirekeýew (TKM)	99	100	100	99	100	100	598	
2	Sergey Belyayev (KAZ)	99	100	100	99	99	100	597	
3	Kang Seung-kyun (KOR)	99	100	98	100	98	100	595	
4	Yao Ye (CHN)	100	99	99	99	98	100	595	
5	Choi Byung-woo (KOR)	99	100	99	99	98	99	594	
6	Wang Weiyi (CHN)	95	100	100	98	100	100	593	
7	Yuriy Melsitov (KAZ)	99	98	99	98	99	100	593	
8	Nam Hyung-jin (KOR)	99	98	98	100	98	100	593	
9	Masaru Yanagida (JPN)	98	100	99	98	98	99	592	
9	Qiu Jian (CHN)	99	99	99	98	98	99	592	
11	Meshal Al-Tahous (KUW)	98	100	98	100	95	100	591	
11	Satguru Das (IND)	97	100	100	97	98	99	591	
11	Naoki Isobe (JPN)	98	100	98	98	99	98	591	
11	Thambukthira Palangappa (IND)	98	98	99	99	100	97	591	
15	Subbaiah Airira Pemmaiah (IND)	99	97	99	98	100	97	590	
16	Tevarit Majchacheep (THA)	95	98	99	98	99	100	589	
16	Vyacheslav Skoromnov (UZB)	99	99	98	97	98	98	589	
16	Varavut Majchacheep (THA)	98	98	99	99	97	98	589	
16	Vitaliy Dovgun (KAZ)	98	98	99	99	98	97	589	
20	Yuri Lomov (KGZ)	97	99	97	99	98	98	588	
20	Ivan Shakhov (UZB)	98	99	100	98	96	97	588	
20	Sergey Kharitonov (UZB)	99	98	100	96	99	96	588	
23	Tsedevdorjiin Mönkh-Erdene (MGL)	99	98	97	98	96	99	587	
23	Hilal Al-Rashidi (OMA)	98	99	99	98	94	99	587	
25	Wu Hui-min (TPE)	99	97	98	95	98	99	586	
26	Lee Ji-sheng (TPE)	98	96	97	97	99	98	585	
26	Kuo Meng-chsi (TPE)	99	98	98	97	95	98	585	
26	Nergüin Enkhbaatar (MGL)	96	99	97	97	99	97	585	
26	Aleksandr Babchenko (KGZ)	96	97	97	99	100	96	585	
30	Khalaf Al-Khatri (OMA)	97	97	95	97	100	98	584	
30	Tachir Ismailov (KGZ)	97	96	97	96	100	98	584	
30	Abdulla Al-Ahmad (QAT)	95	97	98	99	97	98	584	
30	Sabki Mohd Din (MAS)	98	96	98	98	98	96	584	
30	Toshikazu Yamashita (JPN)	99	95	98	99	97	96	584	
30	Abdulnasser Al-Shaiba (QAT)	98	97	99	95	100	95	584	
36	Mohd Hameleay Mutalib (MAS)	98	96	95	98	97	99	583	
36	Khaled Al-Subaie (KUW)	99	96	94	98	99	97	583	
36	Emran Zakaria (MAS)	96	100	97	99	95	96	583	
39	Dadallah Al-Bulushi (OMA)	99	94	97	97	97	98	582	
39	Mufid Al-Lawanseh (JOR)	95	100	97	98	97	95	582	
41	Nutchavapong Kuntawong (THA)	96	96	95	98	97	99	581	
41	Mohsen Al-Abadi (QAT)	98	96	96	97	98	96	581	
43	Bayaryn Sain-Er (MGL)	98	96	96	97	98	94	579	
44	Ayaz Tahir (PAK)	96	98	97	96	95	96	578	
45	Salman Hasan Zaman (BRN)	99	96	95	95	95	95	575	
46	Dawood Muhammad Zai (PAK)	98	97	97	95	94	93	574	
47	Ismail Mahdi (MDV)	95	94	96	96	94	98	573	
48	Mohammad Uzzaman (BAN)	94	96	95	98	95	93	571	
49	Fung Lin Fat (MAC)	95	95	95	93	96	96	570	
50	Anwer Zaman (BAN)	93	96	96	94	94	95	568	
51	Salem Abdulla (BRN)	93	97	92	98	96	88	564	

=== Final ===
Rank	Athlete	Qual.	Final											Total	S-off	Notes
Rank	Athlete	Qual.	1	2	3	4	5	6	7	8	9	10	Total	Total	S-off	Notes
1st place, gold medalist(s)	Sergey Belyayev (KAZ)	597	10.5	10.8	10.0	9.7	10.8	10.1	10.2	10.2	10.7	10.3	103.3	700.3	10.7	
2nd place, silver medalist(s)	Igor Pirekeýew (TKM)	598	10.0	10.1	10.7	9.9	10.5	10.0	10.3	10.0	10.5	10.3	102.3	700.3	10.4	
3rd place, bronze medalist(s)	Yao Ye (CHN)	595	10.1	10.8	10.4	9.9	10.7	10.8	10.2	10.0	9.8	10.1	102.8	697.8		
4	Nam Hyung-jin (KOR)	593	9.8	10.4	10.6	10.2	10.4	10.5	10.1	10.8	10.2	10.3	103.3	696.3		
5	Wang Weiyi (CHN)	593	10.0	10.0	10.5	9.9	10.2	10.6	10.9	10.3	10.0	10.3	102.7	695.7		
6	Kang Seung-kyun (KOR)	595	10.1	9.8	10.2	9.5	10.1	10.1	10.7	8.9	10.4	10.6	100.4	695.4		
7	Choi Byung-woo (KOR)	594	10.0	10.3	10.9	9.8	10.0	10.5	9.8	9.7	10.1	10.1	101.2	695.2		
8	Yuriy Melsitov (KAZ)	593	9.4	9.7	9.6	10.0	10.3	10.3	10.5	10.1	10.2	10.6	100.7	693.7		
