= Shooting at the 2002 Asian Games – Men's 25 metre rapid fire pistol =

Men's

Men's 25 metre rapid fire pistol at the 2002 Asian Games
- Venue: Changwon International Shooting Range
- Dates: 5–6 October 2002
- Competitors: 33 from 15 nations

Medalists
gold medal	Liu Guohui	China
silver medal	Lee Sang-hak	South Korea
bronze medal	Chen Yongqiang	China

The men's 25 metre rapid fire pistol competition at the 2002 Asian Games in Busan, South Korea was held on 5 and 6 October at the Changwon International Shooting Range.

== Schedule ==
All times are Korea Standard Time (UTC+09:00)

Date	Time	Event
Saturday, 5 October 2002	09:00	Qualification stage 1
Sunday, 6 October 2002	09:00	Qualification stage 2
Sunday, 6 October 2002	13:00	Final

== Records ==
Prior to this competition, the existing world, Asian and Games records were as follows.

Qualification
World Record	Ralf Schumann (GER)	597	Munich, Germany	14 June 1995
Asian Record	Vladimir Vokhmyanin (KAZ)	594	Näfels, Switzerland	20 September 1996
Games Record	Zhang Penghui (CHN)	589	Bangkok, Thailand	10 December 1998
Final
World Record	Ralf Schumann (GER)	699.7	Barcelona, Spain	8 June 1994
Asian Record	Vladimir Vokhmyanin (KAZ)	695.5	Milan, Italy	30 May 1999
Games Record	Zhang Penghui (CHN)	688.7	Bangkok, Thailand	10 December 1998

== Results ==
Legend

- DNS — Did not start

=== Qualification ===
Rank	Athlete	Stage 1			Stage 2			Total	Notes
Rank	Athlete	8	6	4	8	6	4	Total	Notes
1	Liu Guohui (CHN)	99	99	99	100	99	96	592	GR
2	Lee Sang-hak (KOR)	98	100	96	98	98	96	586	
3	Kang Chang-sik (PRK)	98	96	96	99	98	98	585	
4	Chen Yongqiang (CHN)	100	97	95	100	96	95	583	
5	Teruyoshi Akiyama (JPN)	99	98	94	97	97	97	582	
6	Ji Haiping (CHN)	100	99	96	99	98	90	582	
7	Kang Hyung-chul (KOR)	100	97	94	97	95	98	581	
8	Dilshod Mukhtarov (UZB)	98	97	97	98	95	96	581	
9	Igor Shmotkin (KAZ)	99	96	96	98	97	95	581	
10	Lee Young-hoon (KOR)	98	96	94	99	98	95	580	
11	Kim Myong-sop (PRK)	98	97	95	99	95	94	578	
12	Shuji Tazawa (JPN)	97	96	93	100	96	95	577	
13	Kim Hyon-ung (PRK)	96	96	94	99	97	93	575	
14	Trịnh Quốc Việt (VIE)	95	92	93	100	99	95	574	
15	Shoichi Uenosono (JPN)	99	99	82	98	97	97	572	
15	Vladimir Vokhmyanin (KAZ)	99	96	94	97	96	90	572	
17	Opas Ruengpanyawut (THA)	97	97	93	98	95	90	570	
18	Nathaniel Padilla (PHI)	98	96	94	94	95	92	569	
19	Li Hao Jian (HKG)	97	97	93	94	94	93	568	
20	Sergey Vokhmyanin (KAZ)	99	95	91	94	95	93	567	
21	Sergey Vozmishchev (UZB)	95	94	94	96	95	92	566	
22	Riaz Khan (QAT)	96	94	91	97	95	91	564	
23	Zafer Al-Qahtani (QAT)	96	96	92	93	93	92	562	
24	Said Al-Hasani (OMA)	98	98	98	95	89	83	561	
24	Dmitru Kuznetsov (KGZ)	98	94	90	94	94	91	561	
26	Phạm Cao Sơn (VIE)	97	95	86	99	96	87	560	
27	Hamed Al-Fulaiti (OMA)	92	92	90	94	93	92	553	
28	Nguyễn Trung Hiếu (VIE)	97	96	83	97	95	82	550	
28	Zahid Ali (PAK)	98	95	84	96	96	81	550	
30	Mustaqeem Shah (PAK)	94	91	90	93	90	88	546	
31	Chiu Kin Chong (MAC)	93	90	88	92	89	84	536	
32	Salem Al-Awaisi (OMA)	95	87	85	92	81	88	528	
—	Enver Osmanov (UZB)							DNS	

=== Final ===
Rank	Athlete	Qual.	Final											Total	S-off	Notes
Rank	Athlete	Qual.	1	2	3	4	5	6	7	8	9	10	Total	Total	S-off	Notes
1st place, gold medalist(s)	Liu Guohui (CHN)	592	10.2	8.9	9.8	10.4	10.7	9.3	10.4	9.6	9.4	10.1	98.8	690.8		GR
2nd place, silver medalist(s)	Lee Sang-hak (KOR)	586	10.8	10.1	10.2	9.6	10.2	10.2	9.4	9.6	10.5	10.2	100.8	686.8		
3rd place, bronze medalist(s)	Chen Yongqiang (CHN)	583	9.6	9.5	10.7	10.5	10.1	10.6	10.0	9.9	9.9	10.4	101.2	684.2		
4	Kang Chang-sik (PRK)	585	9.7	8.9	8.7	10.6	10.1	9.6	9.9	9.1	9.4	10.2	96.2	681.2		
5	Ji Haiping (CHN)	582	9.7	9.1	9.7	10.4	10.1	10.1	8.1	9.8	10.5	10.2	97.7	679.7		
6	Teruyoshi Akiyama (JPN)	582	9.9	9.6	10.4	10.6	8.1	9.5	8.9	10.3	10.5	9.8	97.6	679.6		
