= Shooting at the 2002 Asian Games – Men's 10 metre air pistol team =

Men's 10 metre air pistol team at the 2002 Asian Games
- Venue: Changwon International Shooting Range
- Dates: 3 October 2002
- Competitors: 39 from 13 nations

Medalists
gold medal	China; Tan Zongliang, Wang Yifu, Xu Dan
silver medal	North Korea; Kim Hyon-ung, Kim Jong-su, Ryu Myong-yon
bronze medal	Kazakhstan; Vladimir Guchsha, Vladimir Issachenko, Rashid Yunusmetov

The men's 10 metre air pistol team competition at the 2002 Asian Games in Busan, South Korea was held on 3 October at the Changwon International Shooting Range.

== Schedule ==
All times are Korea Standard Time (UTC+09:00)

Date	Time	Event
Thursday, 3 October 2002	11:00	Final

== Records ==
Prior to this competition, the existing world, Asian and Games records were as follows.

World Record	China	1756	Langkawi, Malaysia	27 January 2000
Asian Record	China	1756	Langkawi, Malaysia	27 January 2000
Games Record	China	1742	Bangkok, Thailand	9 December 1998

== Results ==
Rank	Team	Series						Total	Notes
Rank	Team	1	2	3	4	5	6	Total	Notes
1st place, gold medalist(s)	China (CHN)	287	292	294	290	294	293	1750	GR
	Tan Zongliang	99	99	98	97	98	99	590	
	Wang Yifu	94	96	96	98	99	98	581	
	Xu Dan	94	97	100	95	97	96	579	
2nd place, silver medalist(s)	North Korea (PRK)	290	294	293	292	292	287	1748	
	Kim Hyon-ung	97	99	97	97	98	93	581	
	Kim Jong-su	98	96	98	98	99	99	588	
	Ryu Myong-yon	95	99	98	97	95	95	579	
3rd place, bronze medalist(s)	Kazakhstan (KAZ)	295	286	287	289	291	289	1737	
	Vladimir Guchsha	99	93	98	100	97	94	581	
	Vladimir Issachenko	97	96	93	95	96	98	575	
	Rashid Yunusmetov	99	97	96	94	98	97	581	
4	South Korea (KOR)	282	288	288	293	289	286	1726	
	Jin Jong-oh	96	97	99	98	97	97	584	
	Kim Seon-il	93	96	96	97	97	98	577	
	Song Dong-woo	93	95	93	98	95	91	565	
5	Uzbekistan (UZB)	290	287	286	286	286	288	1723	
	Dilshod Mukhtarov	95	95	98	95	96	97	576	
	Enver Osmanov	98	96	92	96	94	98	574	
	Sergey Vozmishchev	97	96	96	95	96	93	573	
6	Vietnam (VIE)	288	281	288	287	285	288	1717	
	Nguyễn Mạnh Tường	94	95	96	98	96	96	575	
	Phạm Cao Sơn	96	93	96	95	96	95	571	
	Trần Quốc Cường	98	93	96	94	93	97	571	
7	Thailand (THA)	290	288	278	289	287	283	1715	
	Nopparat Kulton	97	96	95	97	95	92	572	
	Jakkrit Panichpatikum	98	97	94	96	97	94	576	
	Opas Ruengpanyawut	95	95	89	96	95	97	567	
8	India (IND)	281	289	288	283	285	288	1714	
	Samaresh Jung	94	95	97	94	96	97	573	
	Ved Prakash Pilaniya	91	96	96	95	95	96	569	
	Jaspal Rana	96	98	95	94	94	95	572	
9	Kyrgyzstan (KGZ)	285	291	283	288	282	284	1713	
	Vladimir Grigoriev	95	97	96	96	96	95	575	
	Dmitru Kuznetsov	94	97	95	96	90	95	567	
	Yuri Melentiev	96	97	92	96	96	94	571	
10	Japan (JPN)	287	285	284	278	285	284	1703	
	Susumu Kobayashi	99	96	98	92	97	95	577	
	Masaru Nakashige	94	96	92	94	93	95	564	
	Shoichi Uenosono	94	93	94	92	95	94	562	
11	Pakistan (PAK)	280	283	277	274	282	282	1678	
	Irshad Ali	96	97	94	91	95	92	565	
	Zahid Ali	91	89	91	92	94	94	551	
	Mustaqeem Shah	93	97	92	91	93	96	562	
12	Oman (OMA)	280	277	277	275	277	281	1667	
	Hamed Al-Fulaiti	93	93	89	92	91	92	550	
	Zaid Al-Hanai	95	92	94	92	93	94	560	
	Said Al-Hasani	92	92	94	91	93	95	557	
13	Kuwait (KUW)	274	271	282	277	279	282	1665	
	Saleh Al-Enezi	91	97	94	91	91	93	557	
	Dawood Al-Shemmari	92	82	95	91	93	96	549	
	Khaled Al-Subaie	91	92	93	95	95	93	559	
