= Shooting at the 2002 Asian Games – Men's 50 metre rifle three positions team =

Men's 50 metre rifle 3 positions team at the 2002 Asian Games
- Venue: Changwon International Shooting Range
- Dates: 7 October 2002
- Competitors: 33 from 11 nations

Medalists
gold medal	China; Cai Yalin, Qiu Jian, Yao Ye
silver medal	South Korea; Cha Young-chul, Nam Hyung-jin, Park Bong-duk
bronze medal	Kazakhstan; Sergey Belyayev, Vitaliy Dovgun, Yuriy Melsitov

The men's 50 metre rifle three positions team competition at the 2002 Asian Games in Busan, South Korea was held on 7 October at the Changwon International Shooting Range.

The rifle 3 positions consists of the kneeling, prone, and standing positions, fired in that order, with 3×40 shots. The caliber was .22 Long Rifle (5.6 mm).

Chinese team with Cai Yalin, Qiu Jian and Yao Ye won the gold medal after setting a new Asian record with 3472 points. The previous record was 3461 set seven years ago in Jakarta.

The host team South Korea (Cha Young-chul, Nam Hyung-jin and Park Bong-duk) finished second only two points behind China and won the silver medal.

Kazakhstan team (Sergey Belyayev, Vitaliy Dovgun and Yuriy Melsitov) won the bronze medal with the score of 3452, twelve points more than fourth placed team Kyrgyzstan. there were eleven teams in the competition with Uzbekistan, Malaysia, Thailand, Mongolia, India and Oman finished fifth to eleventh in that order.

== Schedule ==
All times are Korea Standard Time (UTC+09:00)

Date	Time	Event
Monday, 7 October 2002	09:00	Final

== Records ==
Prior to this competition, the existing world, Asian and Games records were as follows.

World Record	Belarus	3499	Brno, Czech Republic	5 August 1993
Asian Record	China	3461	Jakarta, Indonesia	10 October 1995
Games Record	South Korea	3459	Beijing, China	29 September 1990

== Results ==
Rank	Team	Prone				Standing				Kneeling				Total	Notes
Rank	Team	1	2	3	4	1	2	3	4	1	2	3	4	Total	Notes
1st place, gold medalist(s)	China (CHN)	298	297	295	296	285	283	286	285	289	290	289	279	3472	AR
	Cai Yalin	100	99	96	99	97	93	94	96	94	96	98	93	1155	
	Qiu Jian	99	99	100	98	93	94	96	94	99	97	96	92	1157	
	Yao Ye	99	99	99	99	95	96	96	95	96	97	95	94	1160	
2nd place, silver medalist(s)	South Korea (KOR)	294	297	297	294	289	275	286	281	293	287	289	288	3470	
	Cha Young-chul	98	98	99	97	94	89	97	94	98	96	97	94	1151	
	Nam Hyung-jin	98	99	100	98	97	92	95	92	99	96	97	96	1159	
	Park Bong-duk	98	100	98	99	98	94	94	95	96	95	95	98	1160	
3rd place, bronze medalist(s)	Kazakhstan (KAZ)	293	295	295	295	271	283	281	276	293	294	283	293	3452	
	Sergey Belyayev	98	98	99	98	88	94	91	90	97	96	93	99	1141	
	Vitaliy Dovgun	98	98	97	98	94	95	97	92	100	99	94	97	1159	
	Yuriy Melsitov	97	99	99	99	89	94	93	94	96	99	96	97	1152	
4	Kyrgyzstan (KGZ)	297	296	292	295	280	277	284	281	282	288	276	292	3440	
	Aleksandr Babchenko	100	98	96	99	93	91	95	93	95	99	95	97	1151	
	Tachir Ismailov	99	98	99	99	95	94	96	93	96	92	89	97	1147	
	Yuri Lomov	98	100	97	97	92	92	93	95	91	97	92	98	1142	
5	Uzbekistan (UZB)	291	294	296	294	278	283	277	282	287	286	287	282	3437	
	Sergey Kharitonov	98	99	97	98	91	92	88	88	94	97	97	93	1132	
	Ivan Shakhov	96	96	99	98	95	96	92	97	97	93	95	92	1146	
	Vyacheslav Skoromnov	97	99	100	98	92	95	97	97	96	96	95	97	1159	
6	Japan (JPN)	293	297	296	293	283	280	274	277	286	283	285	276	3423	
	Naoki Isobe	97	99	98	98	92	95	95	95	93	92	95	90	1139	
	Toshikazu Yamashita	98	99	100	97	96	91	85	94	97	98	96	95	1146	
	Masaru Yanagida	98	99	98	98	95	94	94	88	96	93	94	91	1138	
7	Malaysia (MAS)	292	291	289	296	284	277	273	280	285	284	284	285	3420	
	Sabki Mohd Din	99	97	98	98	94	91	91	94	95	91	92	95	1135	
	Mohd Hameleay Mutalib	96	96	95	98	96	93	88	94	96	98	96	93	1139	
	Emran Zakaria	97	98	96	100	94	93	94	92	94	95	96	97	1146	
8	Thailand (THA)	289	293	291	294	281	287	276	278	271	282	286	283	3411	
	Nutchavapong Kuntawong	98	97	98	98	91	93	89	93	87	91	93	94	1122	
	Tevarit Majchacheep	96	99	95	96	96	98	93	94	92	94	100	96	1149	
	Varavut Majchacheep	95	97	98	100	94	96	94	91	92	97	93	93	1140	
9	Mongolia (MGL)	294	296	290	292	288	279	273	275	279	285	273	284	3408	
	Nergüin Enkhbaatar	98	99	99	98	97	90	92	94	92	95	88	95	1137	
	Olzodyn Enkhsaikhan	97	98	97	97	97	92	91	89	92	93	90	95	1128	
	Tsedevdorjiin Mönkh-Erdene	99	99	94	97	94	97	90	92	95	97	95	94	1143	
10	India (IND)	290	291	287	291	281	286	277	271	283	287	287	275	3406	
	Thambukthira Palangappa	96	95	96	94	92	95	94	90	95	96	97	92	1132	
	Subbaiah Airira Pemmaiah	99	100	97	99	94	95	91	92	95	96	96	88	1142	
	Charan Singh	95	96	94	98	95	96	92	89	93	95	94	95	1132	
11	Oman (OMA)	290	294	292	293	263	277	277	276	286	287	279	281	3395	
	Dadallah Al-Bulushi	98	98	99	99	89	91	88	93	97	97	93	91	1133	
	Mohammed Al-Hanai	96	97	95	97	85	90	94	88	95	94	90	92	1113	
	Hilal Al-Rashidi	96	99	98	97	89	96	95	95	94	96	96	98	1149	
