= Shooting at the 2002 Asian Games – Men's 50 metre rifle prone team =

Men's 50 metre rifle prone team at the 2002 Asian Games
- Venue: Changwon International Shooting Range
- Dates: 5 October 2002
- Competitors: 39 from 13 nations

Medalists
gold medal	South Korea; Choi Byung-woo, Kang Seung-kyun, Nam Hyung-jin
silver medal	China; Qiu Jian, Wang Weiyi, Yao Ye
bronze medal	Kazakhstan; Sergey Belyayev, Vitaliy Dovgun, Yuriy Melsitov

The men's 50 metre rifle prone team competition at the 2002 Asian Games in Busan, South Korea was held on 5 October at the Changwon International Shooting Range.

== Schedule ==
All times are Korea Standard Time (UTC+09:00)

Date	Time	Event
Saturday, 5 October 2002	09:00	Final

== Records ==
Prior to this competition, the existing world, Asian and Games records were as follows.

World Record	Russia	1789	Kouvola, Finland	1 July 1997
Asian Record	China	1779	Beijing, China	27 September 1990
Games Record	China	1779	Beijing, China	27 September 1990

== Results ==
Rank	Team	Series						Total	Notes
Rank	Team	1	2	3	4	5	6	Total	Notes
1st place, gold medalist(s)	South Korea (KOR)	297	298	295	299	294	299	1782	AR
	Choi Byung-woo	99	100	99	99	98	99	594	
	Kang Seung-kyun	99	100	98	100	98	100	595	
	Nam Hyung-jin	99	98	98	100	98	100	593	
2nd place, silver medalist(s)	China (CHN)	294	298	298	295	296	299	1780	
	Qiu Jian	99	99	99	98	98	99	592	
	Wang Weiyi	95	100	100	98	100	100	593	
	Yao Ye	100	99	99	99	98	100	595	
3rd place, bronze medalist(s)	Kazakhstan (KAZ)	296	296	298	296	296	297	1779	
	Sergey Belyayev	99	100	100	99	99	100	597	
	Vitaliy Dovgun	98	98	99	99	98	97	589	
	Yuriy Melsitov	99	98	99	98	99	100	593	
4	India (IND)	294	295	298	294	298	293	1772	
	Satguru Das	97	100	100	97	98	99	591	
	Thambukthira Palangappa	98	98	99	99	100	97	591	
	Subbaiah Airira Pemmaiah	99	97	99	98	100	97	590	
5	Japan (JPN)	295	295	295	295	294	293	1767	
	Naoki Isobe	98	100	98	98	99	98	591	
	Toshikazu Yamashita	99	95	98	99	97	96	584	
	Masaru Yanagida	98	100	99	98	98	99	592	
6	Uzbekistan (UZB)	296	296	298	291	293	291	1765	
	Sergey Kharitonov	99	98	100	96	99	96	588	
	Ivan Shakhov	98	99	100	98	96	97	588	
	Vyacheslav Skoromnov	99	99	98	97	98	98	589	
7	Thailand (THA)	289	292	293	295	293	297	1759	
	Nutchavapong Kuntawong	96	96	95	98	97	99	581	
	Tevarit Majchacheep	95	98	99	98	99	100	589	
	Varavut Majchacheep	98	98	99	99	97	98	589	
8	Kyrgyzstan (KGZ)	290	292	291	294	298	292	1757	
	Aleksandr Babchenko	96	97	97	99	100	96	585	
	Tachir Ismailov	97	96	97	96	100	98	584	
	Yuri Lomov	97	99	97	99	98	98	588	
9	Chinese Taipei (TPE)	296	291	293	289	292	295	1756	
	Kuo Meng-chsi	99	98	98	97	95	98	585	
	Lee Ji-sheng	98	96	97	97	99	98	585	
	Wu Hui-min	99	97	98	95	98	99	586	
10	Oman (OMA)	294	290	291	292	291	295	1753	
	Dadallah Al-Bulushi	99	94	97	97	97	98	582	
	Khalaf Al-Khatri	97	97	95	97	100	98	584	
	Hilal Al-Rashidi	98	99	99	98	94	99	587	
11	Mongolia (MGL)	293	293	290	292	293	290	1751	
	Nergüin Enkhbaatar	96	99	97	97	99	97	585	
	Tsedevdorjiin Mönkh-Erdene	99	98	97	98	96	99	587	
	Bayaryn Sain-Er	98	96	96	97	98	94	579	
12	Malaysia (MAS)	292	292	290	295	290	291	1750	
	Sabki Mohd Din	98	96	98	98	98	96	584	
	Mohd Hameleay Mutalib	98	96	95	98	97	99	583	
	Emran Zakaria	96	100	97	99	95	96	583	
13	Qatar (QAT)	291	290	293	291	295	289	1749	
	Mohsen Al-Abadi	98	96	96	97	98	96	581	
	Abdulla Al-Ahmad	95	97	98	99	97	98	584	
	Abdulnasser Al-Shaiba	98	97	99	95	100	95	584	
