= Shooting at the 2006 Asian Games – Men's 50 metre rifle prone =

Men's 50 metre rifle prone at the 2006 Asian Games
- Venue: Lusail Shooting Range
- Dates: 3–4 December 2006
- Competitors: 50 from 20 nations

Medalists
gold medal	Liu Gang	China
silver medal	Igor Pirekeýew	Turkmenistan
bronze medal	Sergey Belyayev	Kazakhstan

The men's 50 metre rifle prone competition at the 2006 Asian Games in Doha, Qatar was held on 3 and 4 December at the Lusail Shooting Range.

== Schedule ==
All times are Arabia Standard Time (UTC+03:00)

Date	Time	Event
Sunday, 3 December 2006	08:00	Elimination
Monday, 4 December 2006	08:00	Qualification
Monday, 4 December 2006	11:45	Final

== Records ==
Prior to this competition, the existing world, Asian and Games records were as follows.

Qualification
World Record	Viatcheslav Botchkarev (URS)	600	Zagreb, Yugoslavia	13 July 1989
Asian Record	Sergey Belyayev (KAZ)	599	Hiroshima, Japan	11 October 1994
Games Record	Sergey Belyayev (KAZ)	599	Hiroshima, Japan	11 October 1994
Final
World Record	Christian Klees (GER)	704.8	Atlanta, United States	25 July 1996
Asian Record	Sergey Belyayev (KAZ)	703.3	Atlanta, United States	25 July 1996
Games Record	Sergey Belyayev (KAZ)	702.1	Hiroshima, Japan	11 October 1994

== Results ==
=== Elimination ===
==== Relay 1 ====
Rank	Athlete	Series						Total	Notes
Rank	Athlete	1	2	3	4	5	6	Total	Notes
1	Sergey Belyayev (KAZ)	100	98	97	99	99	100	593	
2	Lee Hyun-tae (KOR)	99	98	99	99	100	98	593	
3	Tevarit Majchacheep (THA)	99	97	98	98	100	99	591	
4	Toshikazu Yamashita (JPN)	99	99	98	98	98	99	591	
5	Liu Gang (CHN)	98	98	98	98	98	99	589	
6	Park Bong-duk (KOR)	98	100	97	98	96	99	588	
7	Zhang Fu (CHN)	98	99	97	97	96	99	586	
8	Trần Văn Ngọc (VIE)	98	100	95	97	99	97	586	
9	Yuriy Melsitov (KAZ)	96	99	100	95	99	97	586	
10	Olzodyn Enkhsaikhan (MGL)	98	97	99	99	97	96	586	
11	Suphakorn Wisetchai (THA)	97	97	98	98	95	99	584	
12	Khalaf Al-Khatri (OMA)	96	96	100	95	99	98	584	
13	Ayaz Tahir (PAK)	98	95	97	98	99	97	584	
14	Bayaryn Sain-Er (MGL)	94	100	96	97	99	97	583	
15	Sinan Al-Nasri (OMA)	97	99	95	98	97	97	583	
16	Vũ Khánh Hải (VIE)	98	100	95	98	95	95	581	
17	Yuri Lomov (KGZ)	97	98	98	96	98	94	581	
18	Muhammad Mushtaq (PAK)	94	98	96	96	97	99	580	
19	Ali Al-Qahtani (QAT)	95	95	96	99	95	99	579	
20	Takayuki Matsumoto (JPN)	98	97	97	95	94	98	579	
21	Surendra Singh Rathod (IND)	99	95	96	96	95	97	578	
22	Sushil Ghalay (IND)	94	99	97	97	94	97	578	
23	Khalid Al-Anazi (KSA)	97	95	98	96	97	95	578	
24	Tachir Ismailov (KGZ)	99	95	94	94	97	97	576	
25	Abdullah Al-Bogami (KSA)	98	96	96	95	96	94	575	
26	Abdulla Al-Ahmad (QAT)	94	98	95	96	95	93	571	
27	Ahmed Mumthaz (MDV)	95	94	95	93	92	96	565	
28	Ismail Mahdi (MDV)	89	92	93	94	95	95	558	

==== Relay 2 ====
Rank	Athlete	Series						Total	Notes
Rank	Athlete	1	2	3	4	5	6	Total	Notes
1	Igor Pirekeýew (TKM)	98	98	99	99	98	100	592	
2	Vyacheslav Skoromnov (UZB)	98	99	97	98	97	98	587	
3	Vitaliy Dovgun (KAZ)	97	98	98	98	95	97	583	
4	Mangala Samarakoon (SRI)	96	98	95	96	98	96	579	
5	Nguyễn Tấn Nam (VIE)	95	98	98	93	97	97	578	
6	Tadashi Maki (JPN)	95	97	98	97	95	96	578	
7	Abdulnasser Al-Shaiba (QAT)	99	96	94	99	94	96	578	
8	Jeon Dong-ju (KOR)	97	95	94	95	98	98	577	
9	Salman Hasan Zaman (BRN)	97	93	97	100	92	98	577	
10	Zhang Lei (CHN)	96	96	96	96	98	95	577	
11	Tsedevdorjiin Mönkh-Erdene (MGL)	97	96	97	96	97	94	577	
12	Imran Hassan Khan (IND)	97	99	94	94	96	96	576	
13	Mohd Hameleay Mutalib (MAS)	95	95	97	95	96	95	573	
14	Dadallah Al-Bulushi (OMA)	95	93	94	98	96	95	571	
15	Khalid Al-Zamil (KSA)	97	90	93	97	97	95	569	
16	Siddique Umer (PAK)	97	95	93	94	95	95	569	
17	Komkrit Kongnamchok (THA)	95	94	97	94	95	93	568	
18	Ruslan Ismailov (KGZ)	96	93	95	92	94	96	566	
19	Tai Seng Weng (MAC)	96	96	97	91	92	92	564	
20	Jamal Al-Sebbah (BRN)	93	93	91	95	94	96	562	
21	Wong Peng Kun (MAC)	98	93	92	88	92	96	559	
22	Mohamed Abdulla (MDV)	88	91	89	90	84	86	528	

=== Qualification ===
Rank	Athlete	Series						Total	Notes
Rank	Athlete	1	2	3	4	5	6	Total	Notes
1	Liu Gang (CHN)	99	99	99	99	99	100	595	
2	Igor Pirekeýew (TKM)	100	99	98	99	100	96	592	
3	Lee Hyun-tae (KOR)	98	97	98	99	98	100	590	
4	Yuriy Melsitov (KAZ)	98	98	99	99	96	99	589	
5	Tadashi Maki (JPN)	98	99	97	99	99	97	589	
6	Tevarit Majchacheep (THA)	98	99	96	98	98	99	588	
7	Sergey Belyayev (KAZ)	99	99	97	97	98	98	588	
8	Park Bong-duk (KOR)	99	98	97	96	97	100	587	
9	Zhang Lei (CHN)	96	98	99	98	97	99	587	
10	Takayuki Matsumoto (JPN)	98	99	98	94	100	98	587	
11	Nguyễn Tấn Nam (VIE)	97	99	99	98	96	98	587	
12	Surendra Singh Rathod (IND)	98	98	99	93	98	100	586	
13	Trần Văn Ngọc (VIE)	97	97	96	99	99	98	586	
14	Zhang Fu (CHN)	95	99	100	99	96	97	586	
15	Vitaliy Dovgun (KAZ)	97	98	99	98	95	98	585	
16	Dadallah Al-Bulushi (OMA)	97	97	96	99	97	98	584	
17	Sushil Ghalay (IND)	99	99	98	94	94	99	583	
18	Jeon Dong-ju (KOR)	98	96	95	98	98	98	583	
19	Toshikazu Yamashita (JPN)	97	98	96	99	96	97	583	
20	Vũ Khánh Hải (VIE)	98	98	96	97	98	96	583	
21	Siddique Umer (PAK)	97	98	97	98	97	96	583	
22	Vyacheslav Skoromnov (UZB)	98	98	97	99	95	96	583	
23	Ali Al-Qahtani (QAT)	99	97	95	96	98	97	582	
24	Sinan Al-Nasri (OMA)	97	98	98	94	99	96	582	
25	Ayaz Tahir (PAK)	98	97	96	95	97	98	581	
26	Muhammad Mushtaq (PAK)	97	98	97	96	95	98	581	
27	Yuri Lomov (KGZ)	96	96	100	96	96	97	581	
28	Bayaryn Sain-Er (MGL)	95	98	95	98	94	100	580	
29	Olzodyn Enkhsaikhan (MGL)	95	99	97	96	94	99	580	
30	Mohd Hameleay Mutalib (MAS)	96	97	95	97	98	97	580	
31	Ruslan Ismailov (KGZ)	99	96	96	98	94	97	580	
32	Salman Hasan Zaman (BRN)	97	95	97	98	98	95	580	
33	Khalaf Al-Khatri (OMA)	99	98	97	97	94	95	580	
34	Imran Hassan Khan (IND)	94	97	96	98	96	98	579	
35	Tsedevdorjiin Mönkh-Erdene (MGL)	96	97	94	97	96	97	577	
36	Khalid Al-Zamil (KSA)	98	95	97	96	96	95	577	
37	Mangala Samarakoon (SRI)	96	97	97	93	99	94	576	
38	Komkrit Kongnamchok (THA)	98	98	96	95	95	94	576	
39	Suphakorn Wisetchai (THA)	92	98	96	94	97	97	574	
40	Abdulnasser Al-Shaiba (QAT)	96	97	96	93	96	95	573	

=== Final ===
Rank	Athlete	Qual.	Final											Total	S-off	Notes
Rank	Athlete	Qual.	1	2	3	4	5	6	7	8	9	10	Total	Total	S-off	Notes
1st place, gold medalist(s)	Liu Gang (CHN)	595	10.3	10.2	9.6	10.4	10.7	10.0	10.4	10.1	9.5	9.9	101.1	696.1		
2nd place, silver medalist(s)	Igor Pirekeýew (TKM)	592	9.1	10.3	10.0	9.9	10.4	10.7	10.4	10.4	9.5	9.5	100.2	692.2		
3rd place, bronze medalist(s)	Sergey Belyayev (KAZ)	588	10.8	10.2	10.3	10.7	10.6	10.6	10.6	10.0	9.9	10.3	104.0	692.0		
4	Park Bong-duk (KOR)	587	9.9	10.8	10.4	10.4	10.1	10.2	10.4	10.6	9.9	10.8	103.5	690.5		
5	Lee Hyun-tae (KOR)	590	10.6	9.7	9.5	10.2	9.7	9.5	10.4	9.7	10.1	9.5	98.9	688.9		
6	Tevarit Majchacheep (THA)	588	10.8	10.3	9.9	9.6	9.9	9.2	10.2	10.6	10.5	9.7	100.7	688.7		
7	Tadashi Maki (JPN)	589	10.5	10.0	9.5	9.7	10.9	9.8	9.4	10.5	9.5	9.7	99.5	688.5		
8	Yuriy Melsitov (KAZ)	589	10.2	10.5	9.1	9.3	10.0	10.1	10.4	9.8	9.3	10.3	99.0	688.0		
