= Shooting at the 2002 Asian Games – Men's 25 metre center fire pistol =

Men's 25 metre center fire pistol at the 2002 Asian Games
- Venue: Changwon International Shooting Range
- Dates: 7 October 2002
- Competitors: 42 from 17 nations

Medalists
gold medal	Kim Jong-su	North Korea
silver medal	Lee Sang-hak	South Korea
bronze medal	Nguyễn Mạnh Tường	Vietnam

The men's 25 metre center-fire pistol competition at the 2002 Asian Games in Busan, South Korea was held on 7 October at the Changwon International Shooting Range.

== Schedule ==
All times are Korea Standard Time (UTC+09:00)

Date	Time	Event
Monday, 7 October 2002	09:00	Final

== Records ==
Prior to this competition, the existing world, Asian and Games records were as follows.

World Record	Afanasijs Kuzmins (URS)	590	Zagreb, Yugoslavia	15 July 1989
Asian Record	Park Byung-taek (KOR)	590	Lahti, Finland	14 July 2002
Games Record	Park Byung-taek (KOR)	589	Beijing, China	29 September 1990

== Results ==
Rank	Athlete	Precision			Rapid			Total	S-off	Notes
Rank	Athlete	1	2	3	1	2	3	Total	S-off	Notes
1st place, gold medalist(s)	Kim Jong-su (PRK)	97	98	98	100	97	97	587		
2nd place, silver medalist(s)	Lee Sang-hak (KOR)	97	96	99	97	97	100	586	441	
3rd place, bronze medalist(s)	Nguyễn Mạnh Tường (VIE)	97	100	99	94	99	97	586	440	
4	Jakkrit Panichpatikum (THA)	96	96	96	98	98	99	583		
5	Vladimir Vokhmyanin (KAZ)	95	95	96	100	100	97	583		
6	Jin Yongde (CHN)	98	93	99	98	98	97	583		
7	Chen Yongqiang (CHN)	97	97	97	98	98	96	583		
8	Dilshod Mukhtarov (UZB)	95	99	98	98	97	96	583		
9	Kim Hyon-ung (PRK)	96	97	97	98	97	97	582		
10	Jaspal Rana (IND)	95	96	97	95	99	99	581		
10	Liu Yadong (CHN)	98	98	98	94	97	96	581		
12	Enver Osmanov (UZB)	95	96	97	97	99	96	580		
13	Manjunath Patgar (IND)	96	94	97	96	97	97	577		
13	Ryu Myong-yon (PRK)	99	96	93	97	96	96	577		
15	Teruyoshi Akiyama (JPN)	93	95	95	96	98	99	576		
15	Jang Dae-kyu (KOR)	93	97	98	96	96	96	576		
15	Nguyễn Trung Hiếu (VIE)	94	99	97	98	93	95	576		
15	Masaru Nakashige (JPN)	98	98	96	96	94	94	576		
19	Opas Ruengpanyawut (THA)	95	95	95	96	97	97	575		
19	Said Al-Hasani (OMA)	96	98	92	99	93	97	575		
19	Igor Shmotkin (KAZ)	96	94	97	100	93	95	575		
19	Sergey Vokhmyanin (KAZ)	96	97	100	91	97	94	575		
19	Park Byung-taek (KOR)	96	97	99	98	91	94	575		
24	Zahid Ali (PAK)	94	96	96	97	93	98	574		
25	Phạm Cao Sơn (VIE)	98	91	96	98	95	95	573		
26	Nathaniel Padilla (PHI)	95	96	95	97	94	95	572		
26	Gangadhar Sharma (IND)	96	96	96	96	94	94	572		
28	Riaz Khan (QAT)	90	95	97	99	95	94	570		
28	Nopparat Kulton (THA)	97	94	98	94	93	94	570		
30	Zafer Al-Qahtani (QAT)	93	92	96	95	94	98	568		
30	Susumu Kobayashi (JPN)	98	97	99	92	94	88	568		
32	Salem Al-Awaisi (OMA)	92	94	96	93	97	95	567		
32	Irshad Ali (PAK)	96	93	100	90	94	94	567		
34	Man Kin Hung (HKG)	96	93	93	94	94	96	566		
35	Lee Siu Wah (HKG)	93	94	96	91	92	94	560		
36	Khalid Ahmed Mohamed (BRN)	88	93	95	94	93	94	557		
36	Sergey Vozmishchev (UZB)	94	93	93	89	95	93	557		
38	Hamed Al-Fulaiti (OMA)	93	94	93	91	87	93	551		
39	Mustaqeem Shah (PAK)	93	95	93	95	87	85	548		
40	Chiu Kin Chong (MAC)	88	89	86	93	90	96	542		
41	Adel Al-Asad (BRN)	85	90	93	90	89	93	540		
42	Oleg Nabiev (TJK)	89	89	93	94	89	84	538		
