= Shooting at the 2002 Asian Games – Men's 50 metre pistol team =

Men's 50 metre pistol team at the 2002 Asian Games
- Venue: Changwon International Shooting Range
- Dates: 2 October 2002
- Competitors: 30 from 10 nations

Medalists
gold medal	China; Tan Zongliang, Wang Yifu, Xu Dan
silver medal	South Korea; Jin Jong-oh, Kim Seon-il, Lee Sang-do
bronze medal	North Korea; Kim Hyon-ung, Kim Jong-su, Ryu Myong-yon

The men's 50 metre pistol team competition at the 2002 Asian Games in Busan, South Korea was held on 2 October at the Changwon International Shooting Range.

== Schedule ==
All times are Korea Standard Time (UTC+09:00)

Date	Time	Event
Wednesday, 2 October 2002	09:00	Final

== Records ==
Prior to this competition, the existing world, Asian and Games records were as follows.

World Record	Romania	1719	Osijek, Yugoslavia	7 September 1985
Asian Record	China	1699	Lahti, Finland	8 July 2002
Games Record	China	1683	Beijing, China	25 September 1990

== Results ==
Rank	Team	Series						Total	Notes
Rank	Team	1	2	3	4	5	6	Total	Notes
1st place, gold medalist(s)	China (CHN)	279	278	283	285	285	280	1690	GR
	Tan Zongliang	94	92	95	95	94	94	564	
	Wang Yifu	96	94	97	94	96	94	571	
	Xu Dan	89	92	91	96	95	92	555	
2nd place, silver medalist(s)	South Korea (KOR)	282	276	289	279	274	271	1671	
	Jin Jong-oh	95	92	96	93	89	89	554	
	Kim Seon-il	94	90	98	91	93	90	556	
	Lee Sang-do	93	94	95	95	92	92	561	
3rd place, bronze medalist(s)	North Korea (PRK)	279	278	280	278	282	272	1669	
	Kim Hyon-ung	92	93	93	95	94	94	561	
	Kim Jong-su	96	95	96	88	93	91	559	
	Ryu Myong-yon	91	90	91	95	95	87	549	
4	Kazakhstan (KAZ)	281	269	283	284	272	277	1666	
	Vladimir Guchsha	96	92	94	96	89	91	558	
	Vladimir Issachenko	94	93	94	94	93	95	563	
	Rashid Yunusmetov	91	84	95	94	90	91	545	
5	Vietnam (VIE)	281	266	273	282	266	274	1642	
	Nguyễn Mạnh Tường	94	89	90	96	94	92	555	
	Phạm Cao Sơn	93	84	89	94	84	92	536	
	Trần Quốc Cường	94	93	94	92	88	90	551	
6	Uzbekistan (UZB)	268	275	269	278	274	276	1640	
	Dilshod Mukhtarov	89	93	88	97	95	93	555	
	Enver Osmanov	90	92	90	89	86	93	540	
	Sergey Vozmishchev	89	90	91	92	93	90	545	
7	Kyrgyzstan (KGZ)	261	270	272	277	272	276	1628	
	Vladimir Grigoriev	89	89	88	94	90	96	546	
	Dmitru Kuznetsov	87	89	90	96	93	89	544	
	Yuri Melentiev	85	92	94	87	89	91	538	
8	India (IND)	263	278	268	276	271	264	1620	
	Samaresh Jung	89	95	94	95	91	92	556	
	Ved Prakash Pilaniya	82	96	91	91	90	89	539	
	Tapas Kumar Sikder	92	87	83	90	90	83	525	
9	Kuwait (KUW)	263	263	264	258	262	262	1572	
	Saleh Al-Enezi	87	87	88	89	86	88	525	
	Dawood Al-Shemmari	89	91	90	85	89	87	531	
	Khaled Al-Subaie	87	85	86	84	87	87	516	
10	Oman (OMA)	245	248	237	247	267	254	1498	
	Khailfa Al-Hanai	70	73	70	77	88	79	457	
	Zaid Al-Hanai	87	83	80	86	91	86	513	
	Said Al-Hasani	88	92	87	84	88	89	528	
