= Shooting at the 2002 Asian Games – Men's 25 metre center fire pistol team =

Men's 25 metre center fire pistol team at the 2002 Asian Games
- Venue: Changwon International Shooting Range
- Dates: 7 October 2002
- Competitors: 33 from 11 nations

Medalists
gold medal	China; Chen Yongqiang, Jin Yongde, Liu Yadong
silver medal	North Korea; Kim Hyon-ung, Kim Jong-su, Ryu Myong-yon
bronze medal	South Korea; Jang Dae-kyu, Lee Sang-hak, Park Byung-taek

The men's 25 metre center-fire pistol team competition at the 2002 Asian Games in Busan, South Korea was held on 7 October at the Changwon International Shooting Range.

== Schedule ==
All times are Korea Standard Time (UTC+09:00)

Date	Time	Event
Monday, 7 October 2002	09:00	Final

== Records ==
Prior to this competition, the existing world, Asian and Games records were as follows.

World Record	Soviet Union	1762	Moscow, Soviet Union	15 August 1990
Asian Record	South Korea	1760	Lahti, Finland	14 July 2002
Games Record	North Korea; South Korea	1749	Bangkok, Thailand	13 December 1998

== Results ==
Rank	Team	Precision			Rapid			Total	Notes
Rank	Team	1	2	3	1	2	3	Total	Notes
1st place, gold medalist(s)	China (CHN)	293	288	294	290	293	289	1747	
	Chen Yongqiang	97	97	97	98	98	96	583	
	Jin Yongde	98	93	99	98	98	97	583	
	Liu Yadong	98	98	98	94	97	96	581	
2nd place, silver medalist(s)	North Korea (PRK)	292	291	288	295	290	290	1746	
	Kim Hyon-ung	96	97	97	98	97	97	582	
	Kim Jong-su	97	98	98	100	97	97	587	
	Ryu Myong-yon	99	96	93	97	96	96	577	
3rd place, bronze medalist(s)	South Korea (KOR)	286	290	296	291	284	290	1737	
	Jang Dae-kyu	93	97	98	96	96	96	576	
	Lee Sang-hak	97	96	99	97	97	100	586	
	Park Byung-taek	96	97	99	98	91	94	575	
4	Vietnam (VIE)	289	290	292	290	287	287	1735	
	Nguyễn Mạnh Tường	97	100	99	94	99	97	586	
	Nguyễn Trung Hiếu	94	99	97	98	93	95	576	
	Phạm Cao Sơn	98	91	96	98	95	95	573	
5	Kazakhstan (KAZ)	287	286	293	291	290	286	1733	
	Igor Shmotkin	96	94	97	100	93	95	575	
	Sergey Vokhmyanin	96	97	100	91	97	94	575	
	Vladimir Vokhmyanin	95	95	96	100	100	97	583	
6	India (IND)	287	286	290	287	290	290	1730	
	Manjunath Patgar	96	94	97	96	97	97	577	
	Jaspal Rana	95	96	97	95	99	99	581	
	Gangadhar Sharma	96	96	96	96	94	94	572	
7	Thailand (THA)	288	285	289	288	288	290	1728	
	Nopparat Kulton	97	94	98	94	93	94	570	
	Jakkrit Panichpatikum	96	96	96	98	98	99	583	
	Opas Ruengpanyawut	95	95	95	96	97	97	575	
8	Uzbekistan (UZB)	284	288	288	284	291	285	1720	
	Dilshod Mukhtarov	95	99	98	98	97	96	583	
	Enver Osmanov	95	96	97	97	99	96	580	
	Sergey Vozmishchev	94	93	93	89	95	93	557	
8	Japan (JPN)	289	290	290	284	286	281	1720	
	Teruyoshi Akiyama	93	95	95	96	98	99	576	
	Susumu Kobayashi	98	97	99	92	94	88	568	
	Masaru Nakashige	98	98	96	96	94	94	576	
10	Oman (OMA)	281	286	281	283	277	285	1693	
	Salem Al-Awaisi	92	94	96	93	97	95	567	
	Hamed Al-Fulaiti	93	94	93	91	87	93	551	
	Said Al-Hasani	96	98	92	99	93	97	575	
11	Pakistan (PAK)	283	284	289	282	274	277	1689	
	Irshad Ali	96	93	100	90	94	94	567	
	Zahid Ali	94	96	96	97	93	98	574	
	Mustaqeem Shah	93	95	93	95	87	85	548	
