= Shooting at the 2002 Asian Games – Men's 50 metre pistol =

Men's 50 metre pistol at the 2002 Asian Games
- Venue: Changwon International Shooting Range
- Dates: 2 October 2002
- Competitors: 39 from 16 nations

Medalists
gold medal	Wang Yifu	China
silver medal	Tan Zongliang	China
bronze medal	Kim Jong-su	North Korea

The men's 50 metre pistol competition at the 2002 Asian Games in Busan, South Korea was held on 2 October at the Changwon International Shooting Range.

== Schedule ==
All times are Korea Standard Time (UTC+09:00)

Date	Time	Event
Wednesday, 2 October 2002	09:00	Qualification
Wednesday, 2 October 2002	15:10	Final

== Records ==
Prior to this competition, the existing world, Asian and Games records were as follows.

Qualification
World Record	Aleksandr Melentyev (URS)	581	Moscow, Soviet Union	20 July 1980
Asian Record	Xu Dan (CHN)	575	Seoul, South Korea	10 May 1997
Games Record	Masaru Nakashige (JPN)	570	Hiroshima, Japan	7 October 1994
Final
World Record	William Demarest (USA)	676.2	Milan, Italy	4 June 2000
Asian Record	Xu Dan (CHN)	671.8	Seoul, South Korea	10 May 1997
Games Record	Masaru Nakashige (JPN)	664.1	Hiroshima, Japan	7 October 1994

== Results ==
=== Qualification ===
Rank	Athlete	Series						Total	Notes
Rank	Athlete	1	2	3	4	5	6	Total	Notes
1	Wang Yifu (CHN)	96	94	97	94	96	94	571	GR
2	Tan Zongliang (CHN)	94	92	95	95	94	94	564	
3	Vladimir Issachenko (KAZ)	94	93	94	94	93	95	563	
4	Kim Hyon-ung (PRK)	92	93	93	95	94	94	561	
5	Lee Sang-do (KOR)	93	94	95	95	92	92	561	
6	Kim Jong-su (PRK)	96	95	96	88	93	91	559	
7	Vladimir Guchsha (KAZ)	96	92	94	96	89	91	558	
8	Susumu Kobayashi (JPN)	94	92	94	91	93	93	557	
9	Samaresh Jung (IND)	89	95	94	95	91	92	556	
9	Kim Seon-il (KOR)	94	90	98	91	93	90	556	
11	Dilshod Mukhtarov (UZB)	89	93	88	97	95	93	555	
11	Xu Dan (CHN)	89	92	91	96	95	92	555	
11	Nguyễn Mạnh Tường (VIE)	94	89	90	96	94	92	555	
14	Jin Jong-oh (KOR)	95	92	96	93	89	89	554	
15	Trần Quốc Cường (VIE)	94	93	94	92	88	90	551	
16	Jakkrit Panichpatikum (THA)	96	89	93	91	88	93	550	
17	Ryu Myong-yon (PRK)	91	90	91	95	95	87	549	
18	Vladimir Grigoriev (KGZ)	89	89	88	94	90	96	546	
18	Sergey Babikov (TJK)	85	92	93	95	90	91	546	
20	Masaru Nakashige (JPN)	90	91	88	92	91	93	545	
20	Rashid Yunusmetov (KAZ)	91	84	95	94	90	91	545	
20	Sergey Vozmishchev (UZB)	89	90	91	92	93	90	545	
23	Dmitru Kuznetsov (KGZ)	87	89	90	96	93	89	544	
24	Enver Osmanov (UZB)	90	92	90	89	86	93	540	
25	Irshad Ali (PAK)	98	90	85	86	91	89	539	
25	Ved Prakash Pilaniya (IND)	82	96	91	91	90	89	539	
27	Yuri Melentiev (KGZ)	85	92	94	87	89	91	538	
28	Phạm Cao Sơn (VIE)	93	84	89	94	84	92	536	
28	Oleg Nabiev (TJK)	83	92	88	89	93	91	536	
30	Chang Yi-ning (TPE)	88	89	89	89	89	91	535	
31	Dawood Al-Shemmari (KUW)	89	91	90	85	89	87	531	
32	Said Al-Hasani (OMA)	88	92	87	84	88	89	528	
33	Saleh Al-Enezi (KUW)	87	87	88	89	86	88	525	
33	Tapas Kumar Sikder (IND)	92	87	83	90	90	83	525	
35	Zain Al-Sinani (QAT)	89	82	82	83	96	92	524	
36	Khaled Al-Subaie (KUW)	87	85	86	84	87	87	516	
37	Zaid Al-Hanai (OMA)	87	83	80	86	91	86	513	
38	Ghanim Al-Naemi (QAT)	90	84	86	85	82	84	511	
39	Khailfa Al-Hanai (OMA)	70	73	70	77	88	79	457	

=== Final ===
Rank	Athlete	Qual.	Final											Total	S-off	Notes
Rank	Athlete	Qual.	1	2	3	4	5	6	7	8	9	10	Total	Total	S-off	Notes
1st place, gold medalist(s)	Wang Yifu (CHN)	571	9.6	9.4	10.2	9.2	10.4	9.4	8.8	8.9	9.6	7.0	92.5	663.5		
2nd place, silver medalist(s)	Tan Zongliang (CHN)	564	9.3	10.5	9.4	10.4	8.7	10.3	9.4	9.4	7.2	10.4	95.0	659.0		
3rd place, bronze medalist(s)	Kim Jong-su (PRK)	559	9.8	9.4	9.5	10.0	9.3	9.4	8.2	9.9	10.4	9.3	95.2	654.2		
4	Vladimir Guchsha (KAZ)	558	8.2	9.6	10.4	10.2	9.8	9.8	9.8	9.7	8.7	9.2	95.4	653.4		
5	Kim Hyon-ung (PRK)	561	10.1	7.8	8.6	7.7	9.8	9.3	10.0	8.6	9.2	9.5	90.6	651.6		
6	Vladimir Issachenko (KAZ)	563	7.6	9.1	9.6	7.1	6.2	9.1	9.2	8.6	9.2	10.0	85.7	648.7		
7	Lee Sang-do (KOR)	561	9.0	10.0	6.6	8.9	9.4	8.9	9.1	10.0	9.1	6.6	87.6	648.6		
8	Susumu Kobayashi (JPN)	557	8.1	9.2	9.9	9.1	9.0	9.6	9.9	7.6	9.2	8.9	90.5	647.5		
