= Shooting at the 2002 Asian Games – Men's 25 metre rapid fire pistol team =

Men's 25 metre rapid fire pistol team at the 2002 Asian Games
- Venue: Changwon International Shooting Range
- Dates: 5–6 October 2002
- Competitors: 24 from 8 nations

Medalists
gold medal	China; Chen Yongqiang, Ji Haiping, Liu Guohui
silver medal	South Korea; Kang Hyung-chul, Lee Sang-hak, Lee Young-hoon
bronze medal	North Korea; Kang Chang-sik, Kim Hyon-ung, Kim Myong-sop

The men's 25 metre rapid fire pistol team competition at the 2002 Asian Games in Busan, South Korea was held on 5 and 6 October at the Changwon International Shooting Range.

== Schedule ==
All times are Korea Standard Time (UTC+09:00)

Date	Time	Event
Saturday, 5 October 2002	09:00	Stage 1
Sunday, 6 October 2002	09:00	Stage 2

== Records ==
Prior to this competition, the existing world, Asian and Games records were as follows.

World Record	Germany	1770	Brno, Czech Republic	5 August 1993
Asian Record	China	1763	Langkawi, Malaysia	25 January 2000
Games Record	China	1747	Hiroshima, Japan	9 October 1994

== Results ==
Legend

- DNS — Did not start

Rank	Team	Stage 1			Stage 2			Total	Notes
Rank	Team	8	6	4	8	6	4	Total	Notes
1st place, gold medalist(s)	China (CHN)	299	295	290	299	293	281	1757	GR
	Chen Yongqiang	100	97	95	100	96	95	583	
	Ji Haiping	100	99	96	99	98	90	582	
	Liu Guohui	99	99	99	100	99	96	592	
2nd place, silver medalist(s)	South Korea (KOR)	296	293	284	294	291	289	1747	
	Kang Hyung-chul	100	97	94	97	95	98	581	
	Lee Sang-hak	98	100	96	98	98	96	586	
	Lee Young-hoon	98	96	94	99	98	95	580	
3rd place, bronze medalist(s)	North Korea (PRK)	292	289	285	297	290	285	1738	
	Kang Chang-sik	98	96	96	99	98	98	585	
	Kim Hyon-ung	96	96	94	99	97	93	575	
	Kim Myong-sop	98	97	95	99	95	94	578	
4	Japan (JPN)	295	293	269	295	290	289	1731	
	Teruyoshi Akiyama	99	98	94	97	97	97	582	
	Shuji Tazawa	97	96	93	100	96	95	577	
	Shoichi Uenosono	99	99	82	98	97	97	572	
5	Kazakhstan (KAZ)	297	287	281	289	288	278	1720	
	Igor Shmotkin	99	96	96	98	97	95	581	
	Sergey Vokhmyanin	99	95	91	94	95	93	567	
	Vladimir Vokhmyanin	99	96	94	97	96	90	572	
6	Vietnam (VIE)	289	283	262	296	290	264	1684	
	Nguyễn Trung Hiếu	97	96	83	97	95	82	550	
	Phạm Cao Sơn	97	95	86	99	96	87	560	
	Trịnh Quốc Việt	95	92	93	100	99	95	574	
7	Oman (OMA)	285	277	273	281	263	263	1642	
	Salem Al-Awaisi	95	87	85	92	81	88	528	
	Hamed Al-Fulaiti	92	92	90	94	93	92	553	
	Said Al-Hasani	98	98	98	95	89	83	561	
—	Uzbekistan (UZB)							DNS	
	Dilshod Mukhtarov	98	97	97	98	95	96	581	
	Enver Osmanov							DNS	
	Sergey Vozmishchev	95	94	94	96	95	92	566	
