= Shooting at the 1990 Asian Games =

Asian Games

- Venue: Beijing Shooting Range Field
- Dates: 25–30 September 1990

Shooting sports in the 1990 Asian Games were held at Beijing Shooting Range, Beijing, China on September 25–30, 1990.

== Medalists ==
=== Men ===
Event	Gold	Silver	Bronze
10 m air pistol	Zhang Shengge; China	Wang Yifu; China	So Gil-san; North Korea
10 m air pistol team	China; Wang Yifu; Xu Haifeng; Zhang Shengge	North Korea; Kim Gi-jong; Ryu Myong-yon; So Gil-san	Japan; Mamoru Inagaki; Toshiaki Ochi; Fumihisa Semizuki
25 m center fire pistol	Park Byung-taek; South Korea	Shi Yujie; China	Opas Ruengpanyawut; Thailand
25 m center fire pistol team	China; Shi Yujie; Wang Runxi; Xu Haifeng	South Korea; Lee Sang-hak; Lim Jang-soo; Park Byung-taek	Thailand; Wirat Karndee; Nopparat Kulton; Opas Ruengpanyawut
25 m rapid fire pistol	Wang Runxi; China	Lim Jang-soo; South Korea	Meng Gang; China
25 m rapid fire pistol team	South Korea; Lee Jong-il; Lim Jang-soo; Park Byung-taek	China; Liu Jun; Meng Gang; Wang Runxi	Japan; Hideo Nonaka; Katsumasa Onishi; Shoichi Uenosono
25 m standard pistol	Wang Hui; China	Peera Piromratna; Thailand	Kim Bong-chol; North Korea
25 m standard pistol team	China; Wang Hui; Wang Runxi; Wang Yifu	South Korea; Lee Sang-hak; Lim Jang-soo; Park Byung-taek	Thailand; Wirat Karndee; Peera Piromratna; Opas Ruengpanyawut
50 m pistol	Xu Haifeng; China	Li Jinbao; China	Wang Yifu; China
50 m pistol team	China; Li Jinbao; Wang Yifu; Xu Haifeng	Japan; Mamoru Inagaki; Toshiaki Ochi; Fumihisa Semizuki	North Korea; Kim Gi-jong; Ryu Myong-yon; So Gil-san
10 m air rifle	An Byung-kyun; South Korea	Masaru Yanagida; Japan	Ryohei Koba; Japan
10 m air rifle team	Japan; Ryohei Koba; Akihiro Mera; Masaru Yanagida	South Korea; An Byung-kyun; Bae Sung-duk; Kim Jong-gil	North Korea; Hong Gwang-sik; Kim Dong-gil; Kim Yun-sob
50 m rifle prone	Ryohei Koba; Japan	Xu Xiaoguang; China	Cha Young-chul; South Korea
50 m rifle prone team	China; Jiang Rong; Xu Xiaoguang; Zhang Yingzhou	South Korea; Cha Young-chul; Lee Eun-chul; Lee See-hong	Japan; Ryohei Koba; Akihiro Mera; Yuji Ogawa
50 m rifle 3 positions	Lee Eun-chul; South Korea	Ryohei Koba; Japan	Zhang Yingzhou; China
50 m rifle 3 positions team	South Korea; Cha Young-chul; Lee Eun-chul; Lee See-hong	China; Jiang Rong; Xu Xiaoguang; Zhang Yingzhou	Japan; Ryohei Koba; Akihiro Mera; Masaru Yanagida
10 m running target	Ro Chol-sik; North Korea	Cai Zhiyong; China	Zhang Ronghui; China
10 m running target team	China; Cai Zhiyong; Shu Qingquan; Zhang Ronghui	North Korea; Kim Man-chol; Pak Song-gil; Ro Chol-sik	South Korea; Hong Seung-pyo; Kim Woon-jin; Lee Yong-ryul
50 m running target	Ji Gang; China	Hong Seung-pyo; South Korea	Ro Chol-sik; North Korea
50 m running target team	China; Huang Shiping; Ji Gang; Shu Qingquan	North Korea; Kim Gwang-chol; Kim Man-chol; Ro Chol-sik	South Korea; Hong Seung-pyo; Kim Woon-jin; Lee Yong-ryul
50 m running target mixed	Huang Shiping; China	Kim Gwang-chol; North Korea	Hong Seung-pyo; South Korea
50 m running target mixed team	China; Huang Shiping; Ji Gang; Zhang Ronghui	North Korea; Kim Gwang-chol; Kim Man-chol; Pak Song-gil	South Korea; Her Dae-kyung; Hong Seung-pyo; Lee Yong-ryul
Trap	Pae Won-guk; North Korea	Zhang Yongjie; China	Chng Seng Mok; Singapore
Trap team	North Korea; Kim Hak-song; Pae Won-guk; Ri Gil-ryong	China; Chai Wenbin; Zhang Bing; Zhang Yongjie	Japan; Yoshihiro Igarashi; Masao Obara; Kazumi Watanabe
Skeet	Wang Zhonghua; China	O Chang-sok; North Korea	Sin Nam-ho; North Korea
Skeet team	North Korea; O Chang-sok; Ra Sang-uk; Sin Nam-ho	South Korea; Jeon Chan-sik; Kim Ha-yeon; Lim Dong-ki	China; Wang Yongwei; Wang Zhonghua; Zhang Weigang

=== Women ===
Event	Gold	Silver	Bronze
10 m air pistol	Wang Lina; China	Li Duihong; China	Lee Sun-bok; South Korea
10 m air pistol team	China; Li Duihong; Liu Haiying; Wang Lina	South Korea; Boo Soon-hee; Hong Young-ok; Lee Sun-bok	North Korea; Kim Jong-sil; Paek Jong-suk; Ri Hyang-suk
25 m pistol	Li Duihong; China	Wang Lina; China	Qi Chunxia; China
25 m pistol team	China; Li Duihong; Wang Lina; Qi Chunxia	South Korea; Boo Soon-hee; Hong Young-ok; Kim Hye-yeong	North Korea; Kim Jong-sil; Paek Jong-suk; Ra Jong-suk
10 m air rifle	Xu Yanhua; China	Zhang Qiuping; China	Chon Un-ju; North Korea
10 m air rifle team	China; Li Dan; Xu Yanhua; Zhang Qiuping	South Korea; Jin Soon-young; Lee Eun-ju; Yoon Soon-nam	Japan; Noriko Kosai; Yoko Minamoto; Noriko Ojima
50 m rifle prone	Zhang Qiuping; China	Chong Chun-ok; North Korea	Soma Dutta; India
50 m rifle prone team	North Korea; Chon Un-ju; Chong Chun-ok; Ri Jong-ae	China; Rui Qing; Zhang Qiuping; Zhou Danhong	South Korea; Kang Myong-a; Kim Mi-hyang; Lee Hye-kyung
50 m rifle 3 positions	Yoko Minamoto; Japan	Xu Yanhua; China	Zhou Danhong; China
50 m rifle 3 positions team	China; Xu Yanhua; Zhang Qiuping; Zhou Danhong	Japan; Noriko Kosai; Yoko Minamoto; Noriko Ojima	South Korea; Kim Mi-hyang; Kong Hyun-ah; Lee Hye-kyung
Trap	Wang Yujin; China	Miwako Iwao; Japan	Ri Hye-gyong; North Korea
Trap team	China; Lu Ruizhen; Wang Yujin; Yin Weiping	Japan; Miwako Iwao; Taeko Miyauchi; Mitsuko Tokoeda	North Korea; Kim Jong-hui; Pak Yong-hui; Ri Hye-gyong
Skeet	Pak Jong-ran; North Korea	Shared gold	Naomi Komaba; Japan
Skeet	Zhang Shan; China	Shared gold	Naomi Komaba; Japan
Skeet team	China; Shao Weiping; Wu Lanying; Zhang Shan	North Korea; Kim Myong-hwa; Pak Jong-ran; Ri Hyon-ok	Japan; Yumiko Hosoya; Naomi Komaba; Sachiko Ogawa

== Medal table ==
Rank	Nation	Gold	Silver	Bronze	Total
1	China (CHN)	27	14	7	48
2	North Korea (PRK)	6	8	11	25
3	South Korea (KOR)	5	10	8	23
4	Japan (JPN)	3	6	9	18
5	Thailand (THA)	0	1	3	4
6	India (IND)	0	0	1	1
6	Singapore (SIN)	0	0	1	1
Totals (7 entries)		41	39	40	120
