= Shooting at the 2010 Asian Games – Men's 50 metre rifle prone team =

Men's 50 metre rifle prone team at the 2010 Asian Games
- Venue: Aoti Shooting Range
- Dates: 15 November 2010
- Competitors: 48 from 16 nations

Medalists
gold medal	South Korea; Han Jin-seop, Kim Hak-man, Kim Jong-hyun
silver medal	China; Tian Hui, Tian Pu, Wang Weiyi
bronze medal	Kazakhstan; Yuriy Melsitov, Igor Pirekeyev, Alexandr Yermakov

The men's 50 metre rifle prone team competition at the 2010 Asian Games in Guangzhou, China was held on 15 November at the Aoti Shooting Range.

== Schedule ==
All times are China Standard Time (UTC+08:00)

Date	Time	Event
Monday, 15 November 2010	09:00	Final

== Records ==
Prior to this competition, the existing world, Asian and Games records were as follows.

World Record	Austria	1793	Plzeň, Czech Republic	19 July 2003
Asian Record	South Korea	1791	Munich, Germany	1 August 2010
Games Record	China	1782	Busan, South Korea	5 October 2002

== Results ==
Rank	Team	Series						Total	Xs	Notes
Rank	Team	1	2	3	4	5	6	Total	Xs	Notes
1st place, gold medalist(s)	South Korea (KOR)	298	297	297	299	298	296	1785	121	GR
	Han Jin-seop	99	99	100	99	99	98	594	40	
	Kim Hak-man	99	99	98	100	99	100	595	40	
	Kim Jong-hyun	100	99	99	100	100	98	596	41	
2nd place, silver medalist(s)	China (CHN)	294	296	294	297	297	296	1774	110	
	Tian Hui	99	100	97	98	99	100	593	40	
	Tian Pu	97	98	99	100	100	98	592	38	
	Wang Weiyi	98	98	98	99	98	98	589	32	
3rd place, bronze medalist(s)	Kazakhstan (KAZ)	291	297	295	297	296	295	1771	109	
	Yuriy Melsitov	97	100	98	100	100	99	594	37	
	Igor Pirekeyev	97	98	99	98	99	97	588	36	
	Alexandr Yermakov	97	99	98	99	97	99	589	36	
4	Oman (OMA)	293	295	293	295	296	294	1766	90	
	Dadallah Al-Bulushi	95	99	98	98	98	98	586	28	
	Hamed Al-Khatri	100	99	96	98	100	100	593	35	
	Khalaf Al-Khatri	98	97	99	99	98	96	587	27	
5	India (IND)	293	295	289	297	294	295	1763	93	
	Gagan Narang	97	99	95	100	98	98	587	28	
	Surendra Singh Rathod	97	99	97	98	97	98	586	33	
	Hariom Singh	99	97	97	99	99	99	590	32	
6	Thailand (THA)	290	293	293	292	296	292	1756	84	
	Komkrit Kongnamchok	97	98	95	97	97	97	581	26	
	Tevarit Majchacheep	97	98	98	98	100	98	589	33	
	Attapon Uea-aree	96	97	100	97	99	97	586	25	
7	Vietnam (VIE)	290	295	291	293	294	293	1756	78	
	Dương Anh Quân	97	99	96	95	98	99	584	25	
	Nguyễn Thành Đạt	96	100	97	99	99	99	590	33	
	Vũ Thành Hưng	97	96	98	99	97	95	582	20	
8	Singapore (SIN)	289	296	292	294	292	293	1756	78	
	Andy Chee	97	98	96	99	95	97	582	24	
	Kasmijan Kimin	96	99	98	98	98	99	588	24	
	Ong Jun Hong	96	99	98	97	99	97	586	30	
9	Bangladesh (BAN)	293	294	294	294	287	292	1754	73	
	Ramjan Ali	97	99	97	98	99	99	589	31	
	Abdullah Hel Baki	98	98	97	99	94	94	580	24	
	Taufick Shahrear Khan	98	97	100	97	94	99	585	18	
10	Iran (IRI)	292	291	295	291	296	288	1753	79	
	Amin Heidari	94	99	98	97	99	97	584	30	
	Ebrahim Inanloo	98	95	98	96	97	95	579	22	
	Sasan Shahsavari	100	97	99	98	100	96	590	27	
11	Saudi Arabia (KSA)	293	293	293	295	286	292	1752	84	
	Khalid Al-Anazi	99	99	99	99	97	98	591	36	
	Sunhat Al-Otaibi	96	98	100	98	95	96	583	24	
	Khalid Al-Zamil	98	96	94	98	94	98	578	24	
12	Malaysia (MAS)	293	292	289	292	295	289	1750	79	
	Nurrahimin Abdul Halim	97	96	97	98	96	95	579	27	
	Hisyam Adzha	97	98	96	96	100	100	587	25	
	Mohd Shahril Sahak	99	98	96	98	99	94	584	27	
13	Qatar (QAT)	290	291	290	295	295	288	1749	84	
	Abdulla Al-Ahmad	96	96	94	98	99	96	579	25	
	Abdulla Al-Madeed	95	98	98	98	97	96	582	22	
	Ali Al-Muhannadi	99	97	98	99	99	96	588	37	
14	Mongolia (MGL)	291	292	286	295	295	289	1748	75	
	Boldbaataryn Bishrel	97	96	91	99	98	97	578	23	
	Dondovyn Ganzorig	97	100	99	99	98	96	589	30	
	Tsedevdorjiin Mönkh-Erdene	97	96	96	97	99	96	581	22	
15	Myanmar (MYA)	286	294	294	289	291	283	1737	77	
	Aung Nyein Ni	96	97	99	99	96	94	581	26	
	Aung Thura	95	100	96	93	97	94	575	25	
	Lin Aung	95	97	99	97	98	95	581	26	
16	Sri Lanka (SRI)	287	287	293	291	287	288	1733	65	
	Sarath Chandrasiri	95	96	97	97	93	97	575	21	
	Krishantha Kodikara	95	93	97	96	94	91	566	15	
	Mangala Samarakoon	97	98	99	98	100	100	592	29	
