= Shooting at the 2002 Asian Games – Women's trap team =

Women's trap team at the 2002 Asian Games
- Venue: Changwon International Shooting Range
- Dates: 2 October 2002
- Competitors: 15 from 5 nations

Medalists
gold medal	North Korea; Kim Mun-hwa, Pak Yong-hui, Ri Hye-gyong
silver medal	China; Gao E, Ma Huike, Wang Yujin
bronze medal	Japan; Yoshie Ishibashi, Yuki Kurisaki, Taeko Takeba

The women's trap team competition at the 2002 Asian Games in Busan, South Korea was held on 2 October at the Changwon International Shooting Range.

== Schedule ==
All times are Korea Standard Time (UTC+09:00)

Date	Time	Event
Wednesday, 2 October 2002	09:30	Final

== Records ==
Prior to this competition, the existing world, Asian and Games records were as follows.

World Record	China	210	Barcelona, Spain	23 July 1998
Asian Record	China	210	Barcelona, Spain	23 July 1998
Games Record	—	—	—	—

== Results ==
Rank	Team	Round			Total	Notes
Rank	Team	1	2	3	Total	Notes
1st place, gold medalist(s)	North Korea (PRK)	62	65	61	188	GR
	Kim Mun-hwa	21	21	18	60	
	Pak Yong-hui	20	23	21	64	
	Ri Hye-gyong	21	21	22	64	
2nd place, silver medalist(s)	China (CHN)	56	61	67	184	
	Gao E	17	21	23	61	
	Ma Huike	22	19	22	63	
	Wang Yujin	17	21	22	60	
3rd place, bronze medalist(s)	Japan (JPN)	57	60	63	180	
	Yoshie Ishibashi	18	19	21	58	
	Yuki Kurisaki	18	22	21	61	
	Taeko Takeba	21	19	21	61	
4	South Korea (KOR)	55	56	60	171	
	Jon Joung-hee	14	18	17	49	
	Lee Jung-a	20	18	23	61	
	Lee Myung-ae	21	20	20	61	
5	Thailand (THA)	49	52	47	148	
	Buddhidha Piyaoui	20	17	17	54	
	Nattaporn Sungpuean	16	15	17	48	
	Usamas Wanchuen	13	20	13	46	
