= Shooting at the 2002 Asian Games – Women's trap =

Women's trap at the 2002 Asian Games
- Venue: Changwon International Shooting Range
- Dates: 2 October 2002
- Competitors: 16 from 6 nations

Medalists
gold medal	Gao E	China
silver medal	Pak Yong-hui	North Korea
bronze medal	Ri Hye-gyong	North Korea

The women's trap competition at the 2002 Asian Games in Busan, South Korea was held on 2 October at the Changwon International Shooting Range.

== Schedule ==
All times are Korea Standard Time (UTC+09:00)

Date	Time	Event
Wednesday, 2 October 2002	09:30	Qualification
Wednesday, 2 October 2002	16:00	Final

== Records ==
Prior to this competition, the existing world, Asian and Games records were as follows.

Qualification
World Record	Viktoria Chuyko (UKR)	74	Nicosia, Cyprus	13 June 1998
Asian Record	Chen Li (CHN); Gao E (CHN); Guo Hua (CHN)	70	Barcelona, Spain	23 July 1998
Games Record	—	—	—	—
Final
World Record	Elena Tkach (RUS)	97	Seoul, South Korea	12 May 2001
Asian Record	Gao E (CHN)	92	Cairo, Egypt	6 May 2001
Games Record	—	—	—	—

== Results ==
=== Qualification ===
Rank	Athlete	Round			Total	S-off	Notes
Rank	Athlete	1	2	3	Total	S-off	Notes
1	Ri Hye-gyong (PRK)	21	21	22	64		GR
2	Pak Yong-hui (PRK)	20	23	21	64		GR
3	Ma Huike (CHN)	22	19	22	63		
4	Yuki Kurisaki (JPN)	18	22	21	61	+5	
5	Taeko Takeba (JPN)	21	19	21	61	+4	
6	Gao E (CHN)	17	21	23	61	+2	
7	Lee Myung-ae (KOR)	21	20	20	61	+1	
8	Lee Jung-a (KOR)	20	18	23	61	+0	
9	Wang Yujin (CHN)	17	21	22	60		
9	Kim Mun-hwa (PRK)	21	21	18	60		
11	Yoshie Ishibashi (JPN)	18	19	21	58		
12	Buddhidha Piyaoui (THA)	20	17	17	54		
13	Jon Joung-hee (KOR)	14	18	17	49		
14	Nattaporn Sungpuean (THA)	16	15	17	48		
15	Usamas Wanchuen (THA)	13	20	13	46		
16	Gay Corral (PHI)	15	16	14	45		

=== Final ===
Rank	Athlete	Qual.	Final	Total	S-off	Notes
1st place, gold medalist(s)	Gao E (CHN)	61	23	84		GR
2nd place, silver medalist(s)	Pak Yong-hui (PRK)	64	19	83	+5	
3rd place, bronze medalist(s)	Ri Hye-gyong (PRK)	64	19	83	+4	
4	Ma Huike (CHN)	63	19	82		
5	Taeko Takeba (JPN)	61	20	81	+1	
6	Yuki Kurisaki (JPN)	61	20	81	+0	
