= Shooting at the 2002 Asian Games – Women's 10 metre air pistol team =

Women's 10 metre air pistol team at the 2002 Asian Games
- Venue: Changwon International Shooting Range
- Dates: 3 October 2002
- Competitors: 27 from 9 nations

Medalists
gold medal	China; Chen Ying, Ren Jie, Tao Luna
silver medal	Kazakhstan; Zauresh Baibussinova, Galina Belyayeva, Yuliya Bondareva
bronze medal	South Korea; Gang Eun-ra, Ko Jin-sook, Park Jung-hee

The women's 10 metre air pistol team competition at the 2002 Asian Games in Busan, South Korea was held on 3 October at the Changwon International Shooting Range.

== Schedule ==
All times are Korea Standard Time (UTC+09:00)

Date	Time	Event
Thursday, 3 October 2002	09:00	Final

== Records ==
Prior to this competition, the existing world, Asian and Games records were as follows.

World Record	Russia	1161	Brno, Czech Republic	5 August 1993
Asian Record	China	1151	Bangkok, Thailand	8 December 1998
Games Record	China	1151	Bangkok, Thailand	8 December 1998

== Results ==
Rank	Team	Series				Total	Notes
Rank	Team	1	2	3	4	Total	Notes
1st place, gold medalist(s)	China (CHN)	290	291	290	285	1156	AR
	Chen Ying	96	93	98	93	380	
	Ren Jie	96	99	93	98	386	
	Tao Luna	98	99	99	94	390	
2nd place, silver medalist(s)	Kazakhstan (KAZ)	287	280	278	285	1130	
	Zauresh Baibussinova	95	95	93	95	378	
	Galina Belyayeva	96	93	91	94	374	
	Yuliya Bondareva	96	92	94	96	378	
3rd place, bronze medalist(s)	South Korea (KOR)	286	283	282	277	1128	
	Gang Eun-ra	95	92	94	94	375	
	Ko Jin-sook	96	95	94	90	375	
	Park Jung-hee	95	96	94	93	378	
4	Japan (JPN)	279	279	275	283	1116	
	Michiko Fukushima	97	94	94	95	380	
	Yukari Konishi	90	94	89	96	369	
	Yuki Yoshida	92	91	92	92	367	
5	Mongolia (MGL)	278	278	280	273	1109	
	Otryadyn Gündegmaa	95	93	94	96	378	
	Tsogbadrakhyn Mönkhzul	93	96	93	91	373	
	Davaajantsangiin Oyuun	90	89	93	86	358	
6	India (IND)	284	279	271	274	1108	
	Shweta Chaudhary	96	94	94	92	376	
	Sheila Kanungo	95	89	87	90	361	
	Shilpi Singh	93	96	90	92	371	
7	United Arab Emirates (UAE)	273	281	279	265	1098	
	Fatima Al-Booki	88	90	95	89	362	
	Shamma Al-Muhairi	94	93	91	88	366	
	Sumaya Mubarak	91	98	93	88	370	
8	Hong Kong (HKG)	275	279	275	264	1093	
	Chan Lai Ping	93	92	93	90	368	
	Tsui Leung Ying	91	95	90	84	360	
	Yan Suk Yin	91	92	92	90	365	
9	Qatar (QAT)	254	262	239	210	965	
	Hissa Al-Asiri	79	90	74	35	278	
	Banu Hijazi	89	84	87	83	343	
	Bahiya Jabir	86	88	78	92	344	
