= Shooting at the 2002 Asian Games – Women's skeet =

Women's skeet at the 2002 Asian Games
- Venue: Changwon International Shooting Range
- Dates: 7 October 2002
- Competitors: 12 from 6 nations

Medalists
gold medal	Son Hye-kyoung	South Korea
silver medal	Shi Hongyan	China
bronze medal	Kim Yeun-hee	South Korea

The women's skeet competition at the 2002 Asian Games in Busan, South Korea was held on 7 October at the Changwon International Shooting Range.

== Schedule ==
All times are Korea Standard Time (UTC+09:00)

Date	Time	Event
Monday, 7 October 2002	09:30	Qualification
Monday, 7 October 2002	16:00	Final

== Records ==
Prior to this competition, the existing world, Asian and Games records were as follows.

Qualification
World Record	Svetlana Demina (RUS)	75	Kumamoto, Japan	1 June 1999
Asian Record	Wei Ning (CHN)	74	Doha, Qatar	27 January 2001
Games Record	—	—	—	—
Final
World Record	Svetlana Demina (RUS)	99	Kumamoto, Japan	1 June 1999
Asian Record	Wei Ning (CHN)	97	Doha, Qatar	27 January 2001
Games Record	—	—	—	—

== Results ==
=== Qualification ===
Rank	Athlete	Round			Total	S-off	Notes
Rank	Athlete	1	2	3	Total	S-off	Notes
1	Son Hye-kyoung (KOR)	23	24	23	70		GR
2	Shi Hongyan (CHN)	24	24	22	70		GR
3	Kim Yeun-hee (KOR)	22	23	22	67		
4	Pak Jong-ran (PRK)	25	19	22	66		
5	Hsieh Ming-yi (TPE)	21	23	20	64		
6	Arti Singh Rao (IND)	21	22	20	63	+2	
7	Wei Ning (CHN)	20	21	22	63	+1	
8	Chen Zhenru (CHN)	18	23	21	62		
9	Kwak Yu-hyun (KOR)	20	21	20	61		
10	Mikiko Nagase (JPN)	21	19	20	60		
11	Huang Shih-ting (TPE)	19	20	19	58		
12	Chou Tsai-jung (TPE)	16	16	16	48		

=== Final ===
Rank	Athlete	Qual.	Final	Total	S-off	Notes
1st place, gold medalist(s)	Son Hye-kyoung (KOR)	70	23	93		GR
2nd place, silver medalist(s)	Shi Hongyan (CHN)	70	21	91		
3rd place, bronze medalist(s)	Kim Yeun-hee (KOR)	67	22	89		
4	Pak Jong-ran (PRK)	66	22	88		
5	Hsieh Ming-yi (TPE)	64	21	85	+1	
6	Arti Singh Rao (IND)	63	22	85	+0	
