= Shooting at the 2002 Asian Games – Women's skeet team =

Women's skeet team at the 2002 Asian Games
- Venue: Changwon International Shooting Range
- Dates: 7 October 2002
- Competitors: 9 from 3 nations

Medalists
| gold medal | South Korea; Kim Yeun-hee, Kwak Yu-hyun, Son Hye-kyoung |
| silver medal | China; Chen Zhenru, Shi Hongyan, Wei Ning |
| bronze medal | Chinese Taipei; Chou Tsai-jung, Hsieh Ming-yi, Huang Shih-ting |

The women's skeet team competition at the 2002 Asian Games in Busan, South Korea was held on 7 October at the Changwon International Shooting Range.

== Schedule ==
All times are Korea Standard Time (UTC+09:00)

| Date | Time | Event |
|---|---|---|
| Monday, 7 October 2002 | 09:30 | Final |

== Records ==
Prior to this competition, the existing world, Asian and Games records were as follows.

| World Record | Russia | 214 | Poussan, France | 8 September 1999 |
| Asian Record | China | 202 | Cairo, Egypt | 6 May 2001 |
| Games Record | — | — | — | — |

== Results ==
| Rank | Team | Round | | | Total | Notes |
| Rank | Team | 1 | 2 | 3 | Total | Notes |
|---|---|---|---|---|---|---|
| 1st place, gold medalist(s) | South Korea (KOR) | 65 | 68 | 65 | 198 | GR |
| | Kim Yeun-hee | 22 | 23 | 22 | 67 | |
| | Kwak Yu-hyun | 20 | 21 | 20 | 61 | |
| | Son Hye-kyoung | 23 | 24 | 23 | 70 | |
| 2nd place, silver medalist(s) | China (CHN) | 62 | 68 | 65 | 195 | |
| | Chen Zhenru | 18 | 23 | 21 | 62 | |
| | Shi Hongyan | 24 | 24 | 22 | 70 | |
| | Wei Ning | 20 | 21 | 22 | 63 | |
| 3rd place, bronze medalist(s) | Chinese Taipei (TPE) | 56 | 59 | 55 | 170 | |
| | Chou Tsai-jung | 16 | 16 | 16 | 48 | |
| | Hsieh Ming-yi | 21 | 23 | 20 | 64 | |
| | Huang Shih-ting | 19 | 20 | 19 | 58 | |
