= Shooting at the 2002 Asian Games – Women's double trap team =

Women's double trap team at the 2002 Asian Games
- Venue: Changwon International Shooting Range
- Dates: 5 October 2002
- Competitors: 12 from 4 nations

Medalists
gold medal	China; Ding Hongping, Wang Jinglin, Zhang Yafei
silver medal	South Korea; Kim Saet-byeol, Lee Sang-hee, Son Hye-kyoung
bronze medal	Japan; Yuka Arai, Megumi Inoue, Miyoko Matsushima

The women's double trap team competition at the 2002 Asian Games in Busan, South Korea was held on 5 October at the Changwon International Shooting Range.

== Schedule ==
All times are Korea Standard Time (UTC+09:00)

Date	Time	Event
Saturday, 5 October 2002	09:30	Final

== Records ==
Prior to this competition, the existing world, Asian and Games records were as follows.

World Record	China	328	Cairo, Egypt	4 May 2001
Asian Record	China	328	Cairo, Egypt	4 May 2001
Games Record	China	317	Hiroshima, Japan	10 October 1994

== Results ==
Rank	Team	Round			Total	Notes
Rank	Team	1	2	3	Total	Notes
1st place, gold medalist(s)	China (CHN)	108	101	116	325	GR
	Ding Hongping	36	33	39	108	
	Wang Jinglin	38	31	39	108	
	Zhang Yafei	34	37	38	109	
2nd place, silver medalist(s)	South Korea (KOR)	107	101	111	319	
	Kim Saet-byeol	32	31	38	101	
	Lee Sang-hee	38	37	36	111	
	Son Hye-kyoung	37	33	37	107	
3rd place, bronze medalist(s)	Japan (JPN)	101	105	106	312	
	Yuka Arai	38	33	35	106	
	Megumi Inoue	35	38	36	109	
	Miyoko Matsushima	28	34	35	97	
4	Chinese Taipei (TPE)	92	107	87	286	
	Lin Yi-chun	33	38	34	105	
	Wen Kai-lu	33	32	30	95	
	Wu Meng-ying	26	37	23	86	
