= Shooting at the 2002 Asian Games – Men's double trap team =

Men's double trap team at the 2002 Asian Games
- Venue: Changwon International Shooting Range
- Dates: 5 October 2002
- Competitors: 24 from 8 nations

Medalists
| gold medal | South Korea; Jung Yoon-kyun, Kim Byoung-jun, Park Jung-hwan |
| silver medal | China; Hu Binyuan, Li Bo, Li Shuangchun |
| bronze medal | Chinese Taipei; Chen Shih-wei, Lin Chin-hsien, Shih Wei-tin |

The men's double trap team competition at the 2002 Asian Games in Busan, South Korea was held on 5 October at the Changwon International Shooting Range.

== Schedule ==
All times are Korea Standard Time (UTC+09:00)

| Date | Time | Event |
|---|---|---|
| Saturday, 5 October 2002 | 09:30 | Final |

== Records ==
Prior to this competition, the existing world, Asian and Games records were as follows.

| World Record | Italy | 429 | Nicosia, Cyprus | 11 June 1998 |
| Asian Record | China | 420 | Hiroshima, Japan | 10 October 1994 |
| Games Record | China | 390 | Bangkok, Thailand | 10 December 1998 |

== Results ==
| Rank | Team | Round | | | Total | Notes |
| Rank | Team | 1 | 2 | 3 | Total | Notes |
|---|---|---|---|---|---|---|
| 1st place, gold medalist(s) | South Korea (KOR) | 141 | 137 | 140 | 418 | GR |
| | Jung Yoon-kyun | 49 | 45 | 47 | 141 | |
| | Kim Byoung-jun | 46 | 46 | 47 | 139 | |
| | Park Jung-hwan | 46 | 46 | 46 | 138 | |
| 2nd place, silver medalist(s) | China (CHN) | 140 | 134 | 139 | 413 | |
| | Hu Binyuan | 44 | 46 | 49 | 139 | |
| | Li Bo | 47 | 46 | 46 | 139 | |
| | Li Shuangchun | 49 | 42 | 44 | 135 | |
| 3rd place, bronze medalist(s) | Chinese Taipei (TPE) | 128 | 143 | 138 | 409 | |
| | Chen Shih-wei | 46 | 49 | 46 | 141 | |
| | Lin Chin-hsien | 40 | 45 | 45 | 130 | |
| | Shih Wei-tin | 42 | 49 | 47 | 138 | |
| 4 | Kuwait (KUW) | 132 | 133 | 131 | 396 | |
| | Hamad Al-Afasi | 42 | 44 | 42 | 128 | |
| | Fehaid Al-Deehani | 46 | 43 | 45 | 134 | |
| | Mashfi Al-Mutairi | 44 | 46 | 44 | 134 | |
| 5 | North Korea (PRK) | 123 | 134 | 128 | 385 | |
| | Kim Chol-myong | 40 | 46 | 42 | 128 | |
| | Pae Won-guk | 40 | 42 | 45 | 127 | |
| | Sin Jong-chol | 43 | 46 | 41 | 130 | |
| 6 | India (IND) | 120 | 126 | 129 | 375 | |
| | Moraad Ali Khan | 38 | 47 | 43 | 128 | |
| | Rajyavardhan Singh Rathore | 42 | 47 | 43 | 132 | |
| | Ronjan Sodhi | 39 | 35 | 41 | 115 | |
| 7 | Qatar (QAT) | 117 | 119 | 138 | 374 | |
| | Rashid Hamad Al-Athba | 39 | 38 | 48 | 125 | |
| | Hamad Al-Marri | 38 | 40 | 45 | 123 | |
| | Abdulbaset Mohsin | 40 | 41 | 45 | 126 | |
| 8 | Singapore (SIN) | 120 | 118 | 111 | 349 | |
| | Lee Wung Yew | 41 | 42 | 35 | 118 | |
| | Ler Soon Tien | 36 | 35 | 35 | 106 | |
| | Tan Chee Keong | 43 | 41 | 41 | 125 | |
