= Shooting at the 2002 Asian Games – Men's double trap =

Men's double trap at the 2002 Asian Games
- Venue: Changwon International Shooting Range
- Dates: 5 October 2002
- Competitors: 27 from 10 nations

Medalists
gold medal	Chen Shih-wei	Chinese Taipei
silver medal	Shih Wei-tin	Chinese Taipei
bronze medal	Jung Yoon-kyun	South Korea

The men's double trap competition at the 2002 Asian Games in Busan, South Korea was held on 5 October at the Changwon International Shooting Range.

== Schedule ==
All times are Korea Standard Time (UTC+09:00)

Date	Time	Event
Saturday, 5 October 2002	09:30	Qualification
Saturday, 5 October 2002	15:30	Final

== Records ==
Prior to this competition, the existing world, Asian and Games records were as follows.

Qualification
World Record	Michael Diamond (AUS)	147	Barcelona, Spain	19 July 1998
Asian Record	Fehaid Al-Deehani (KUW)	145	Hiroshima, Japan	10 October 1994
Games Record	Fehaid Al-Deehani (KUW)	145	Hiroshima, Japan	10 October 1994
Final
World Record	Daniele Di Spigno (ITA)	194	Tampere, Finland	7 July 1999
Asian Record	Zhang Bing (CHN)	191	Chengdu, China	4 February 1995
Games Record	Fehaid Al-Deehani (KUW)	187	Hiroshima, Japan	10 October 1994

== Results ==
=== Qualification ===
Rank	Athlete	Round			Total	S-off	Notes
Rank	Athlete	1	2	3	Total	S-off	Notes
1	Jung Yoon-kyun (KOR)	49	45	47	141		
2	Chen Shih-wei (TPE)	46	49	46	141		
3	Hu Binyuan (CHN)	44	46	49	139		
4	Kim Byoung-jun (KOR)	46	46	47	139		
5	Li Bo (CHN)	47	46	46	139		
6	Shih Wei-tin (TPE)	42	49	47	138	+18	
7	Park Jung-hwan (KOR)	46	46	46	138	+17	
8	Ahmed Al-Maktoum (UAE)	44	45	47	136		
9	Li Shuangchun (CHN)	49	42	44	135		
10	Fehaid Al-Deehani (KUW)	46	43	45	134		
10	Mashfi Al-Mutairi (KUW)	44	46	44	134		
12	Rajyavardhan Singh Rathore (IND)	42	47	43	132		
12	Yoichi Kobayashi (JPN)	42	47	43	132		
14	Lin Chin-hsien (TPE)	40	45	45	130		
14	Sin Jong-chol (PRK)	43	46	41	130		
16	Moraad Ali Khan (IND)	38	47	43	128		
16	Kim Chol-myong (PRK)	40	46	42	128		
16	Hamad Al-Afasi (KUW)	42	44	42	128		
19	Pae Won-guk (PRK)	40	42	45	127		
19	Saif Al-Shamsi (UAE)	40	42	45	127		
21	Abdulbaset Mohsin (QAT)	40	41	45	126		
22	Rashid Hamad Al-Athba (QAT)	39	38	48	125		
22	Tan Chee Keong (SIN)	43	41	41	125		
24	Hamad Al-Marri (QAT)	38	40	45	123		
25	Lee Wung Yew (SIN)	41	42	35	118		
26	Ronjan Sodhi (IND)	39	35	41	115		
27	Ler Soon Tien (SIN)	36	35	35	106		

=== Final ===
Rank	Athlete	Qual.	Final	Total	S-off	Notes
1st place, gold medalist(s)	Chen Shih-wei (TPE)	141	46	187	+2	
2nd place, silver medalist(s)	Shih Wei-tin (TPE)	138	49	187	+1+2	
3rd place, bronze medalist(s)	Jung Yoon-kyun (KOR)	141	46	187	+1+1	
4	Kim Byoung-jun (KOR)	139	45	184		
5	Hu Binyuan (CHN)	139	44	183		
6	Li Bo (CHN)	139	43	182		
