= Trịnh Quốc Việt =

Vietnamese sports shooter

Personal information
- Nationality: Vietnamese
- Born: 4 December 1966 (age 58)

Sport
- Sport: Sports shooting

Trịnh Quốc Việt (born 4 December 1966) is a Vietnamese sports shooter. He competed in the men's 50 metre pistol event at the 1996 Summer Olympics.
