= Zhang Yongjie =

Chinese sports shooter (born 1968)

Zhang Yongjie (simplified Chinese: 张永杰; traditional Chinese: 張永杰; pinyin: Zhāng Yǒngjié, born 11 April 1968) is a Chinese sport shooter who competed in the 1992 Summer Olympics, in the 1996 Summer Olympics, and in the 2000 Summer Olympics.

He is from Qingdao.
