= Pak Yong-hui =

North Korean sport shooter

Personal information
- Nationality: North Korea
- Born: 24 August 1970 (age 55) Pyongyang, North Korea
- Height: 1.58 m (5 ft 2 in)
- Weight: 55 kg (121 lb)

Sport
- Sport: Shooting
- Event: Trap
- Club: D.P.R.K. Shootong Sport; Association
- Coached by: Pae Won Guk
Medal record
Women's shooting
Representing North Korea
Asian Games
Silver medal – second place	2002 Busan	Trap
Asian Championships
Silver medal – second place	2007 Kuwait City	Trap team
Bronze medal – third place	2007 Kuwait City	Trap
Asian Shotgun Championships
Silver medal – second place	2017 Astana	Trap team
Bronze medal – third place	2013 Almaty	Trap team
Bronze medal – third place	2014 Al-Ain	Trap team

- Pak Yong-hui
- Hangul: 박영희
- RR: Bak Yeonghui
- MR: Pak Yŏnghŭi

Pak Yong-hui (Korean pronunciation: [pa.ɡjʌŋ.ɦi] or [pak̚] [jʌŋ.ɦi]; born August 24, 1970, in Pyongyang) is a North Korean sport shooter. She won two silver medals in the women's trap at the 2002 Asian Games in Busan, South Korea, and at the 2008 ISSF World Cup series in Beijing, with scores of 83 and 90 targets, respectively.

Pak represented North Korea at the 2008 Summer Olympics in Beijing, where she competed in women's trap shooting. She finished only in eighteenth place by one point behind South Africa's Diane Swanton, for a total score of 56 targets.
