= Park Bong-duk =

South Korean sports shooter

Park Bong-Duk
Personal information
- Nationality: South Korea
- Born: 23 September 1973 (age 52) Seoul, South Korea
- Height: 1.77 m (5 ft 9 1/2 in)
- Weight: 83 kg (183 lb)

Sport
- Sport: Shooting
- Event(s): 10 m air rifle (AR40); 50 m rifle prone (FR60PR); 50 m rifle 3 positions (STR3X20)
- Coached by: Yoon Duk Ha
Medal record
Men's shooting
Representing South Korea
Asian Games
Bronze medal – third place	1998 Bangkok	50 m rifle 3 positions
Bronze medal – third place	2002 Busan	50 m rifle 3 positions
Asian Championships
Silver medal – second place	2007 Kuwait City	50 m rifle 3 positions team
Bronze medal – third place	2007 Kuwait City	50 m rifle prone

Park Bong-Duk (also Pak Bong-Deok, Korean: 박봉덕; born September 23, 1973) is a South Korean sport shooter. He won two bronze medals in the men's 50 m rifle three positions at the 1998 Asian Games in Bangkok, Thailand, and at the 2002 Asian Games in Busan, South Korea, with scores of 1,247 and 1,256.8 points, respectively. He also competed for two rifle shooting events (prone and three positions) at the 2004 Summer Olympics in Athens, but he neither reached the final round, nor claimed an Olympic medal.

He was born in Seoul, South Korea. Four years after competing in his first Olympics, Park qualified for his second South Korean team, as a 35-year-old, at the 2008 Summer Olympics in Beijing, by placing third for the 50 m rifle prone (FR60PR) from the 2007 Asian Shooting Championships in Kuwait City, Kuwait. Park also received additional places for the 10 m air rifle (AR40) and 50 m rifle 3 positions (STR3X20); therefore, he competed for all rifle shooting events.

In his first event, 10 m air rifle, Park was able to hit a total of 593 points within six attempts, finishing sixteenth in the qualifying rounds. Few days later, he placed forty-third in the 50 m rifle prone, by one target ahead of Canada's Johannes Sauer from the fifth attempt, with a total score of 587 points. In his third and last event, 50 m rifle 3 positions, Park was able to shoot 398 targets in a prone position, 373 in standing, and 388 in kneeling, for a total score of 1,159 points, finishing only in thirty-first place.

== Olympic results ==
Event	2004	2008
50 metre rifle three positions	24th 1162	31st 1159
50 metre rifle prone	9th 591	43rd 587
10 metre air rifle	—	16th 593
