= Li Hao Jian =

Hong Kong sports shooter

Personal information
- Nationality: Hong Konger
- Born: 30 October 1956 (age 68)

Sport
- Sport: Sports shooting

Li Hao Jian (born 30 October 1956) is a Hong Kong sports shooter. He competed in the men's 25 metre rapid fire pistol event at the 2000 Summer Olympics.
