= Taeko Takeba =

Japanese sports shooter

Personal information
- Full name: Taeko Takeba
- Nationality: Japan
- Born: 16 June 1966 (age 60) Kobe, Japan
- Height: 1.59 m (5 ft 2 1/2 in)
- Weight: 66 kg (146 lb)

Sport
- Sport: Shooting
- Event: Trap (TR75)
- Club: Ehime Clay Shooting; Association
- Coached by: Atsushi Otsuke

Taeko Takeba (竹葉 多重子, Takeba Taeko; born June 16, 1966 in Kobe) is a Japanese trap shooter. She won a gold medal in the women's trap at the 2001 ISSF World Cup final in Doha, Qatar, achieved a fifth-place finish at the 2002 Asian Games in Busan, South Korea, and represented Japan in two editions of the Olympic Games (2000 and 2004). During her sporting career, she trained full-time for the Ehime Clay Shooting Association under her personal coach, Atsushi Otsuke

Takeba made her official debut at the 2000 Summer Olympics in Sydney, where she wound up sixteenth in the inaugural women's trap with a score of 56 hits, narrowly escaping from the last spot in a field of seventeen shooters by four points.

Shortly after the Games, Takeba gained recognition by winning a gold medal over Russian shooter and world record holder Elena Tkach at the 2001 ISSF World Cup final with a remarkable score of 88 targets.

At the 2004 Summer Olympics in Athens, Takeba qualified for her second Japanese squad, as a 38-year-old, in the women's trap by attaining a minimum score of 68 and securing an Olympic ticket from the 2002 ISSF World Cup series in Shanghai, China. Improving her position from the previous Games, she amassed a total score of 59 hits out of 75 targets in the qualifying stage, but narrowly missed the final round by a single-point deficit with an eighth-place finish.
