= Cai Yalin =

Chinese sports shooter (born 1977)

Personal information
- Native name: 蔡亚林
- Born: September 3, 1977 (age 48) Chengde, Hebei, China
Medal record
Men's shooting
Representing China
Gold medal – first place	2000 Sydney	10 m air rifle

Cai Yalin (Chinese: 蔡亚林; pinyin: Cài Yàlín; born September 3, 1977, in Chengde, Hebei) is a male Chinese sports shooter. He won the 10 m air rifle at the 2000 Summer Olympics, in the process beating the Olympic record of 695.7pts with 696.4pts.

== Major performances ==
- 1997 National Games – 3rd
- 1998 World Championships – 7th
- 1998 Bangkok Asian Games – 1st 10 m air rifle individual, 2nd 10 m air rifle team
- 1998 National Shooting Series – 1st (NR)
- 1998 World Championships – 7th
- 2000 Sydney Olympic Games – 1st 10 m air rifle (696.4pts, OR)
- 2002 Pusan Asian Games – 1st 10 m air rifle team (1788pts, WR) & 50 m free rifle team (3472pts, AR)
