= Kim Yeun-hee =

South Korean sport shooter (born 1960)

Kim Yeun-hee (born 12 November 1960) is a South Korean sport shooter who competed in the 2004 Summer Olympics.
