= Kang Hyung-chul =

South Korean sport shooter

Medal record

Men's shooting

Representing South Korea

Asian Championships
Silver medal – second place	2007 Kuwait City	25 m rapid fire pistol team

Kang Hyung-chul (born 21 February 1982) is a South Korean sport shooter who competed in the 2004 Summer Olympics.
