= Igor Pirekeyev =

Turkmenistani sports shooter

Medal record

Men's shooting

Representing Turkmenistan

Asian Games
Gold medal – first place	1998 Bangkok	50 m rifle prone
Gold medal – first place	2002 Busan	50 m rifle 3 positions
Silver medal – second place	2002 Busan	50 m rifle prone
Silver medal – second place	2006 Doha	50 m rifle prone

Representing Kazakhstan

Asian Games
Silver medal – second place	2010 Guangzhou	50 m rifle 3 positions team
Bronze medal – third place	2010 Guangzhou	50 m rifle prone team

Asian Championships
Bronze medal – third place	2015 Kuwait City	50 m rifle prone team
Bronze medal – third place	2015 Kuwait City	50 m rifle 3 positions team

Igor Pirekeyev (Игорь Пирекеев; born May 16, 1971, in Ashgabat, Turkmen SSR) is a former Turkmenistani and current Kazakh shooter and two-time gold medalist at the Asian Games. He also competed for Turkmenistan at the Summer Olympics in 1996, 2000 and 2004. At the 2000 Olympics, Pirekeyev qualified for the final round of the men's 50 metre rifle prone event and finished in seventh place.
