= Wang Weiyi (sport shooter) =

Chinese sport shooter (born 1974)

Medal record

Men's shooting

Representing China

Asian Championships
Silver medal – second place	2012 Doha	50 m rifle prone team
Bronze medal – third place	2012 Doha	50 m rifle prone

Wang Weiyi (born 31 January 1974 in Shaanxi) is a Chinese rifle shooter. He competed in the 50 m rifle prone event at the 2012 Summer Olympics, where he placed 28th.
