= Khalaf Al-Khatri =

Omani sports shooter

Personal information
- Nationality: Oman
- Born: 1 January 1964 (age 61); Wadi Ghul, Oman
- Height: 1.72 m (5 ft 8 in)
- Weight: 67 kg (148 lb)

Sport
- Sport: Shooting

Khalaf Al-Khatri (Arabic: خلف الخاطري, born 1 January 1964) is an Omani sport shooter. He competed in the 1992 and 1996 Summer Olympics.

Al-Khatri began shooting competitively in 1989. He became the Omani national champion and later set Arab records in several events. In addition to his participation at two Olympics, he also placed sixth at the 1997 World Championships.
