= Xu Dan =

Chinese sport shooter (born 1969)

Xu Dan (Chinese: 徐丹; pinyin: Xú Dān; born April 13, 1969, in Changchun, Jilin) is a male Chinese sports shooter, specializing in 50 metre pistol, who competed in the 1996 Summer Olympics, in the 2000 Summer Olympics, and in the 2004 Summer Olympics.

Olympic results
Event	1996	2000	2004
50 metre pistol	30th 552	14th 558	18th 553
