= Cha Young-chul =

South Korean sport shooter (born 1959)

Olympic medal record

Men's shooting

Representing South Korea
| Silver medal – second place | 1988 Seoul | 50 m rifle prone |

- Cha Young-chul
- Hangul: 차영철
- RR: Cha Yeongcheol
- MR: Ch'a Yŏngch'ŏl

Cha Young-chul (Korean: 차영철; born 28 July 1959) is a South Korean sport shooter who competed in the 1988 Summer Olympics, the 1992 Summer Olympics, and the 1996 Summer Olympics.
