= Yuri Melentiev =

Kyrgyzstani sports shooter

Personal information
- Nationality: Kyrgyzstani
- Born: 3 September 1964 (age 60); Frunze, Kirghiz SSR, Soviet Union

Sport
- Sport: Shooting
- Event(s): 50 metre pistol, 10 metre air pistol

Yuri Remmovich Melentiev (Russian: Юрий Реммович Мелентьев; born 3 September 1964 in Frunze) is a Kyrgyz sport shooter. He competed in pistol shooting events at the Summer Olympics in 1996 and 2000.

His older brother, Alexander was also a sport shooter.

== Olympic results ==
| Event | 1996 | 2000 |
|---|---|---|
| 10 metre air pistol (men) | T-12th | T-17th |
| 50 metre pistol (men) | T-20th | T-34th |
