= Vitaliy Dovgun =

Kazakhstani sport shooter (born 1971)

Personal information
- Full name: Vitaliy Semyonovich Dovgun
- Nationality: Kazakhstan
- Born: 15 February 1971 (age 55)
- Height: 1.89 m (6 ft 2 1/2 in)
- Weight: 104 kg (229 lb)

Sport
- Sport: Shooting
- Event(s): 10 m air rifle (AR40); 50 m rifle prone (FR60PR); 50 m rifle 3 positions (STR3X20)
- Club: Dynamo Almaty
Medal record
Men's shooting
Representing Kazakhstan
Asian Games
Gold medal – first place	2006 Doha	50 m rifle prone team
Silver medal – second place	2006 Doha	50 m rifle 3 positions team
Silver medal – second place	2010 Guangzhou	50 m rifle 3 positions team
Bronze medal – third place	2002 Busan	50 m rifle 3 positions team
Bronze medal – third place	2002 Busan	50 m rifle prone team

Vitaliy Semyonovich Dovgun (Kazakh: Виталий Семёнович Довгун; born February 15, 1971) is a Kazakhstani sport shooter. At age thirty-eight, Dovgun made his official debut for the 2008 Summer Olympics in Beijing, where he competed in all three rifle shooting events. He is also the husband of four-time Olympian Olga Dovgun, who qualified for the same category at these Olympic games.

In his first event, 10 m air rifle, Dovgun was able to hit a total of 587 points within six attempts, finishing thirty-eighth in the qualifying rounds. Few days later, he placed twentieth in the 50 m rifle prone, by one target ahead of Slovenia's Rajmond Debevec from the second attempt, with a total score of 592 points. In his third and last event, 50 m rifle 3 positions, Yurkov was able to shoot 398 targets in a prone position, 381 in standing, and 379 in kneeling, for a total score of 1,158 points, finishing only in twenty-seventh place.
