= Masaru Yanagida =

Japanese sport shooter

Masaru Yanagida (born 17 November 1969 by 柳田勝) is a Japanese sport shooter who competed in the 1992 Summer Olympics, in the 1996 Summer Olympics, in the 2000 Summer Olympics and in the 2004 Summer Olympics.
