= Sergey Belyayev =

Kazakhstani shooter (1960–2020)

Medal record

Men's shooting

Representing Kazakhstan

Olympic Games
| Silver medal – second place | 1996 Atlanta | 50 m rifle 3 pos |
| Silver medal – second place | 1996 Atlanta | 50 m rifle prone |

Sergey Nikolayevich Belyayev (Russian: Сергей Николаевич Беляев; 8 May 1960 – 6 September 2020) was a Kazakhstani shooter, who won two silver medals in 50 metre rifle at the 1996 Summer Olympics in Atlanta. He was born in Tashkent, Uzbek SSR.
