= Opas Ruengpanyawut =

Thai sport shooter (1955–2020)

Personal information
- Nationality: Thailand
- Born: 18 August 1955
- Died: 22 January 2020 (aged 64)
Medal record
Men's shooting
Representing Thailand
Asian Games
Gold medal – first place	1986 Seoul	STP team
Gold medal – first place	2002 Busan	STP
Bronze medal – third place	1982 New Delhi	CFP team
Bronze medal – third place	1990 Beijing	CFP
Bronze medal – third place	1990 Beijing	CFP team
Bronze medal – third place	1990 Beijing	STP team
Bronze medal – third place	2006 Doha	STP team

Opas Ruengpanyawut (18 August 1955 — 22 January 2020) was a Thai sport shooter who competed in the 1984 Summer Olympics. He also participated in eight editions of Asian Games and won seven medals.
