= Vladimir Vokhmyanin =

Kazakhstani sports shooter (born 1962)

Personal information
- Full name: Vladimir Anatolyevich Vokhmyanin
- Born: 27 January 1962 (age 64) Temirtau, Kazakh SSR, Soviet Union
Medal record
Men's shooting
Olympic Games
Representing the Unified Team
Bronze medal – third place	1992 Barcelona	25 m rapid fire pistol
Representing Kazakhstan
Bronze medal – third place	1996 Atlanta	25 m rapid fire pistol

Vladimir Anatolyevich Vokhmyanin (Russian: Владимир Анатольевич Вохмянин, born 27 January 1962) is a Kazakhstani sport shooter.

He was born in Temirtau. He won two Olympic bronze medals in 25 metre rapid fire pistol; one at the 1992 Summer Olympics for the Unified Team and one at the 1996 Summer Olympics for Kazakhstan. He also finished 21st in 1988 and 12th in 2000. He trained at Dynamo in Alma-Ata.
