= Yuriy Melsitov =

Kazakhstani sport shooter

Medal record

Men's shooting

Asian Games

Representing Kazakhstan
Gold medal – first place	2006 Doha	50 m rifle prone team
Silver medal – second place	1994 Hiroshima	50 m rifle 3 positions team
Silver medal – second place	2006 Doha	50 m rifle 3 positions team
Silver medal – second place	2010 Guangzhou	50 m rifle prone
Bronze medal – third place	1994 Hiroshima	50 m rifle prone team
Bronze medal – third place	2002 Busan	50 m rifle prone team
Bronze medal – third place	2002 Busan	50 m rifle 3 positions team
Bronze medal – third place	2010 Guangzhou	50 m rifle prone team

Yuriy Melsitov (Юрий Владимирович Мельситов; born July 7, 1964) is a Kazakh shooter. He was the winner of the 2006 Asian Games in the rifle prone team competition.
