= Nguyễn Mạnh Tường (sport shooter) =

Vietnamese sports shooter

Nguyen Manh Tuong
Personal information
- Nationality: Vietnam
- Born: 15 June 1960 (age 66) Kim Sơn, Ninh Bình, Vietnam
- Height: 1.70 m (5 ft 7 in)
- Weight: 65 kg (143 lb)

Sport
- Sport: Shooting
- Events: 10 m air pistol (AP60); 25 m centre fire pistol (CFP); 50 m pistol (FP)
Medal record
Men's shooting
Representing Vietnam
Asian Games
Bronze medal – third place	2002 Busan	CFP
Asian Championships
Silver medal – second place	2012 Doha	25 m center fire pistol team
Bronze medal – third place	2012 Doha	10 m air pistol team

Nguyen Manh Tuong (Vietnamese: Nguyễn Mạnh Tường; born June 15, 1960) is a Vietnamese sport shooter. He won a bronze medal for the men's 25 m centre-fire pistol (CFP) at the 2002 Asian Games in Busan, South Korea, with a score of 586 points.

At age forty-four, Nguyen made his official debut for the 2004 Summer Olympics in Athens, where he finished forty-first in the men's 10 m air pistol by one point behind Chinese Taipei's Chang Yi Ning, with a score of 568 points.

At the 2008 Summer Olympics in Beijing, Nguyen competed for the second time in two pistol shooting events. He scored a total of 572 targets in the preliminary rounds of the men's 10 m air pistol, by three points ahead of Ukraine's Ivan Rybovalov from the final attempt, finishing only in thirty-fourth place. Three days later, Nguyen placed thirty-eighth in his second event, 50 m pistol, by two points ahead of Poland's Wojciech Knapik from the final attempt, with a total score of 543 targets.
