= Dilshod Mukhtarov =

Uzbekistani sports shooter (born 1975)

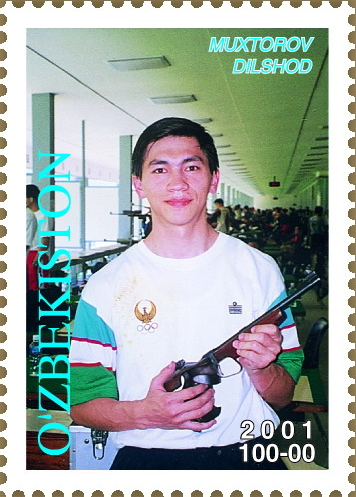

Personal information
- Nationality: Uzbekistan
- Born: 4 January 1975 (age 51) Tashkent, Uzbek SSR
- Height: 1.74 m (5 ft 8 1/2 in)
- Weight: 68 kg (150 lb)

Sport
- Sport: Shooting
- Event(s): 50 m pistol 10 m air pistol

Dilshod Mukhtarov (Uzbek: Дильшод Мухтаров; born 4 January 1975) is an Uzbekistani sport shooter. Mukhtarov made his official debut at the 2000 Summer Olympics in Sydney, where he finished ninth in the men's 10 m air pistol, with a score of 379 points, tying his position with Russia's Vladimir Goncharov. He also reached the final of the men's 50 m pistol event, but finished only in fifth place by two tenths of a point behind Goncharov, for a total score of 662.0.

Mukhtarov made a comeback from his eight-year absence at the 2008 Summer Olympics in Beijing, where he competed for the second time in two pistol shooting events. He placed fifteenth out of forty-eight shooters in the men's 10 m air pistol, with a total score of 580 points. Three days later, Mukhtarov competed for his second event, 50 m rifle pistol, where he was able to fire 10 shots each in six attempts, for a total score of 549 points, finishing only in thirty-first place.
