= Ryu Myong-yon =

North Korean sport shooter

Personal information
- Nationality: North Korea
- Born: 9 January 1970 (age 56)
- Height: 1.76 m (5 ft 9 1/2 in)
- Weight: 68 kg (150 lb)

Sport
- Sport: Shooting
- Event(s): 10 m air pistol (AP60); 50 m pistol (FP)
Medal record
Men's shooting
Representing North Korea
Asian Championships
Gold medal – first place	2007 Kuwait City	25 m center fire pistol team
Gold medal – first place	2007 Kuwait City	25 m standard pistol team

- Ryu Myong-yon
- Hangul: 류명연
- RR: Ryu Myeongyeon
- MR: Ryu Myŏngyŏn

Ryu Myong-yon (Korean: 류명연; born January 9, 1970) is a North Korean sport shooter. Ryu made his official debut for the 1992 Summer Olympics in Barcelona, where he placed twenty-sixth in the 10 m air pistol, and twenty-eighth in the 50 m pistol, accumulating scores of 574 and 550 points, respectively.

Sixteen years after competing in his last Olympics, Ryu qualified for his second North Korean team, as a 38-year-old, at the 2008 Summer Olympics in Beijing, by receiving a place from the 2006 ISSF World Shooting Championships in Zagreb, Croatia. He finished only in twenty-seventh place in the preliminary rounds of the men's 50 m pistol, by four points behind South Korea's Lee Dae-myung from the fifth attempt, for a total score of 551 targets.
