= Kim Hyon-ung =

North Korean sport shooter (born 1975)

Personal information
- Born: 16 January 1975 (age 51)

Sport
- Country: North Korea
Medal record
Men's shooting
Representing North Korea
Asian Championships
| Gold medal – first place | 2007 Kuwait City | 25 m center fire pistol |
| Gold medal – first place | 2007 Kuwait City | 25 m center fire pistol team |
| Gold medal – first place | 2007 Kuwait City | 25 m standard pistol team |
| Bronze medal – third place | 2007 Kuwait City | 25 m standard pistol |

Kim Hyon-ung (born 16 January 1975) is a North Korean sport shooter who competed in the 2004 Summer Olympics.
