= Kazakhstan at the 2002 Asian Games =

- IOC code: KAZ
- NOC: National Olympic Committee of the Republic of Kazakhstan

in Busan
- Competitors: 284
- Medals Ranked 4th: Gold 20 Silver 26 Bronze 30 Total 76

Asian Games appearances (overview)
- 1994; 1998; 2002; 2006; 2010; 2014; 2018; 2022; 2026

Kazakhstan participated in the 2002 Asian Games held in Busan, South Korea, from September 29 to October 14, 2002. Athletes from Kazakhstan won overall 76 medals (including 20 golds), and clinched fourth spot in the medal table.
