= Shooting at the 2006 Asian Games – Men's 25 metre rapid fire pistol =

Men's 25 metre rapid fire pistol at the 2006 Asian Games
- Venue: Lusail Shooting Range
- Dates: 6 December 2006
- Competitors: 39 from 17 nations

Medalists
gold medal	Liu Zhongsheng	China
silver medal	Zhang Penghui	China
bronze medal	Vijay Kumar	India

The men's 25 metre rapid fire pistol competition at the 2006 Asian Games in Doha, Qatar was held on 6 December at the Lusail Shooting Range.

== Schedule ==
All times are Arabia Standard Time (UTC+03:00)

Date	Time	Event
Wednesday, 6 December 2006	08:00	Qualification stage 1
Wednesday, 6 December 2006	10:30	Qualification stage 2
Wednesday, 6 December 2006	14:30	Final

== Records ==
Prior to this competition, the existing world, Asian and Games records were as follows.

Qualification
World Record	Aleksey Klimov (RUS)	591	Granada, Spain	6 October 2006
Asian Record	Liu Guohui (CHN)	586	Milan, Italy	19 June 2005
Games Record	—	—	—	—
Final
World Record	Ralf Schumann (GER)	787.7	Milan, Italy	3 June 2006
Asian Record	Zhang Penghui (CHN)	784.1	Milan, Italy	19 June 2005
Games Record	—	—	—	—

== Results ==
Legend

- DNS — Did not start

=== Qualification ===
Rank	Athlete	Stage 1			Stage 2			Total	Notes
Rank	Athlete	8	6	4	8	6	4	Total	Notes
1	Zhang Penghui (CHN)	99	95	99	96	96	95	580	GR
2	Liu Guohui (CHN)	99	99	89	99	100	93	579	
3	Liu Zhongsheng (CHN)	99	100	92	97	99	92	579	
4	Vijay Kumar (IND)	95	98	93	98	98	95	577	
5	Tomohiro Kida (JPN)	98	96	93	98	99	93	577	
6	Teruyoshi Akiyama (JPN)	98	98	93	98	99	91	577	
7	Lee Young-hoon (KOR)	94	96	96	97	99	93	575	
8	Vladimir Vokhmyanin (KAZ)	99	95	94	97	97	93	575	
9	Pemba Tamang (IND)	98	98	92	99	96	91	574	
10	Sergey Vokhmyanin (KAZ)	98	96	91	98	98	92	573	
11	Igor Shmotkin (KAZ)	97	97	89	95	97	97	572	
12	Kim Myong-sop (PRK)	96	95	91	96	96	96	570	
13	Wong Fai (HKG)	98	94	95	95	95	93	570	
14	Hong Seong-hwan (KOR)	95	97	96	100	95	85	568	
15	Hasli Izwan (MAS)	97	97	89	97	93	94	567	
16	Shigefumi Harada (JPN)	98	90	94	97	96	92	567	
17	Nathaniel Padilla (PHI)	96	95	91	96	96	92	566	
18	Yam Fong Hoi (HKG)	95	90	91	99	96	94	565	
19	Hwang Yoon-sam (KOR)	98	95	92	95	95	89	564	
20	Rahul Panwar (IND)	100	92	94	96	97	84	563	
21	Nguyễn Huy Quang Phúc (VIE)	99	90	89	94	96	94	562	
22	Jakkrit Panichpatikum (THA)	99	92	90	99	95	87	562	
23	Lkhagvaagiin Undralbat (MGL)	98	95	91	97	96	84	561	
24	Mustaqeem Shah (PAK)	95	96	92	97	91	88	559	
25	Li Hao Jian (HKG)	92	97	89	97	95	87	557	
26	Pongpol Kulchairattana (THA)	98	91	85	96	96	89	555	
27	Lê Doãn Cường (VIE)	95	90	88	96	92	90	551	
28	Chio Hong Chi (MAC)	96	88	89	92	92	93	550	
29	Trịnh Quốc Việt (VIE)	94	93	81	96	96	89	549	
30	Maqbool Tabassum (PAK)	93	94	83	95	93	90	548	
31	Sami Saleh Mohamed (BRN)	88	89	87	96	93	91	544	
32	Zafer Al-Qahtani (QAT)	90	91	84	94	93	90	542	
33	Natthapong Sriyaepan (THA)	86	94	87	95	91	87	540	
34	Afsar Khan (PAK)	96	73	89	93	97	91	539	
35	Maed Al-Gazi (QAT)	90	91	92	90	92	81	536	
36	Juma Abdulaziz (BRN)	91	91	73	96	92	78	521	
37	Riaz Khan (QAT)	86	96	59	94	96	87	518	
38	Ashban Sulaiman (BRN)	81	77	58	80	82	48	426	
—	Dilshod Mukhtarov (UZB)							DNS	

=== Final ===
Rank	Athlete	Qual.	Final											Total	S-off	Notes
Rank	Athlete	Qual.	1	2	3	4	5	6	7	8	9	10	Total	Total	S-off	Notes
1st place, gold medalist(s)	Liu Zhongsheng (CHN)	579	10.4	9.9	9.7	9.0	10.5	10.2	10.2	10.1	10.6	9.4	199.4	778.4		GR
1st place, gold medalist(s)	Liu Zhongsheng (CHN)	579	10.5	9.7	10.4	8.4	9.4	9.6	10.4	10.1	10.3	10.6	199.4	778.4		GR
2nd place, silver medalist(s)	Zhang Penghui (CHN)	580	9.1	10.3	9.2	10.2	9.9	10.0	10.0	9.7	10.7	9.9	198.1	778.1		
2nd place, silver medalist(s)	Zhang Penghui (CHN)	580	10.2	10.5	9.8	8.7	9.8	10.6	9.3	9.5	10.8	9.9	198.1	778.1		
3	Liu Guohui (CHN)	579	9.9	10.0	10.0	9.5	10.5	7.8	10.1	10.2	10.8	10.0	197.5	776.5		
3	Liu Guohui (CHN)	579	10.1	10.3	9.6	9.2	10.2	10.1	10.0	9.9	8.9	10.4	197.5	776.5		
3rd place, bronze medalist(s)	Vijay Kumar (IND)	577	8.6	10.4	9.8	10.7	10.6	9.7	9.4	9.6	10.7	8.8	198.3	775.3		
3rd place, bronze medalist(s)	Vijay Kumar (IND)	577	10.4	10.4	10.6	9.9	10.2	9.5	9.2	9.3	10.4	10.1	198.3	775.3		
5	Teruyoshi Akiyama (JPN)	577	8.4	7.3	10.3	9.0	10.7	10.3	9.8	10.5	10.0	10.1	193.9	770.9		
5	Teruyoshi Akiyama (JPN)	577	8.2	10.5	10.2	9.0	9.1	9.6	10.5	9.9	10.4	10.1	193.9	770.9		
6	Tomohiro Kida (JPN)	577	10.2	10.6	9.2	9.7	10.1	10.0	10.1	10.4	9.3	9.9	184.8	761.8		
6	Tomohiro Kida (JPN)	577	10.1	8.6	9.6	8.0	9.9	0.0	9.1	10.4	10.3	9.3	184.8	761.8		

- Vijay Kumar was awarded bronze because of no three-medal sweep per country rule.
