= Shooting at the 2006 Asian Games – Men's 25 metre center fire pistol =

Men's 25 metre center fire pistol at the 2006 Asian Games
- Venue: Lusail Shooting Range
- Dates: 8 December 2006
- Competitors: 51 from 21 nations

Medalists
gold medal	Jaspal Rana	India
silver medal	Liu Guohui	China
bronze medal	Jakkrit Panichpatikum	Thailand

The men's 25 metre center-fire pistol competition at the 2006 Asian Games in Doha, Qatar was held on 8 December at the Lusail Shooting Range.

== Schedule ==
All times are Arabia Standard Time (UTC+03:00)

Date	Time	Event
Friday, 8 December 2006	08:00	Final

== Records ==
Prior to this competition, the existing world, Asian and Games records were as follows.

World Record	Afanasijs Kuzmins (URS)	590	Zagreb, Yugoslavia	15 July 1989
Asian Record	Park Byung-taek (KOR)	590	Lahti, Finland	14 July 2002
Games Record	Park Byung-taek (KOR)	589	Beijing, China	29 September 1990

== Results ==
Legend

- DNS — Did not start

Rank	Athlete	Precision			Rapid			Total	S-off	Notes
Rank	Athlete	1	2	3	1	2	3	Total	S-off	Notes
1st place, gold medalist(s)	Jaspal Rana (IND)	98	98	98	100	98	98	590		GR
2nd place, silver medalist(s)	Liu Guohui (CHN)	95	99	95	99	99	100	587		
3rd place, bronze medalist(s)	Jakkrit Panichpatikum (THA)	96	99	98	99	95	99	586		
4	Park Byung-taek (KOR)	96	97	95	99	97	100	584		
5	Hoàng Xuân Vinh (VIE)	97	97	96	94	100	98	582		
6	Kim Jong-su (PRK)	100	97	97	97	96	94	581		
7	Mohsen Nasr Esfahani (IRI)	96	96	98	94	96	100	580		
8	Vladimir Vokhmyanin (KAZ)	93	94	95	100	99	99	580		
9	Vijay Kumar (IND)	96	95	95	97	98	99	580		
10	Hong Seong-hwan (KOR)	97	96	98	93	98	98	580		
11	Sergey Vokhmyanin (KAZ)	98	95	95	97	97	98	580		
12	Samaresh Jung (IND)	95	95	97	96	95	100	578		
13	Teruyoshi Akiyama (JPN)	97	96	95	94	99	97	578		
14	Tomohiro Kida (JPN)	98	98	96	96	96	94	578		
15	Susumu Kobayashi (JPN)	98	97	100	93	96	93	577		
16	Mustaqeem Shah (PAK)	92	96	95	97	97	99	576		
17	Zhang Penghui (CHN)	95	97	94	94	98	98	576		
18	Nguyễn Mạnh Tường (VIE)	94	96	96	95	96	98	575		
19	Jang Dae-kyu (KOR)	92	96	97	95	95	99	574		
20	Kim Hyon-ung (PRK)	97	95	95	96	96	95	574		
21	Dilshod Mukhtarov (UZB)	98	95	95	95	98	92	573		
22	Liu Zhongsheng (CHN)	96	97	97	91	95	96	572		
23	Khalid Ahmed Mohamed (BRN)	96	97	96	94	93	95	571		
24	Ryu Myong-yon (PRK)	98	97	98	92	93	93	571		
25	Mohammad Zein (SYR)	92	92	94	95	96	99	568		
26	Hasli Izwan (MAS)	93	92	90	99	98	96	568		
27	Said Al-Hasani (OMA)	94	94	94	94	97	95	568		
28	Hadi Al-Qahtani (KSA)	93	98	99	91	94	93	568		
29	Vladimir Issachenko (KAZ)	96	97	97	94	91	93	568		
30	Opas Ruengpanyawut (THA)	97	92	94	92	98	94	567		
31	Ebrahim Barkhordari (IRI)	92	95	95	95	97	92	566		
32	Zafer Al-Qahtani (QAT)	90	96	94	95	96	94	565		
33	Irshad Ali (PAK)	96	97	92	95	93	92	565		
34	Muhammad Boota (PAK)	93	92	96	93	93	97	564		
35	Maed Al-Gazi (QAT)	94	96	92	90	94	97	563		
36	Adib Issa (SYR)	96	94	91	95	89	97	562		
37	Riaz Khan (QAT)	95	92	94	95	94	92	562		
38	Prakarn Karndee (THA)	89	92	95	94	95	96	561		
39	Hadij Hatem (SYR)	89	100	90	92	93	95	559		
40	Phạm Cao Sơn (VIE)	96	96	95	89	95	88	559		
41	Leong Chi Kin (MAC)	91	95	92	91	97	92	558		
42	Mohammed Al-Amri (KSA)	90	96	95	83	97	96	557		
43	Chio Hong Chi (MAC)	88	91	93	94	96	91	553		
44	Saied Al-Qahtani (KSA)	93	98	92	90	92	86	551		
45	Tang Pak Kou (MAC)	92	94	92	86	91	87	542		
46	Adel Al-Asad (BRN)	90	90	91	97	86	82	536		
47	Hossein Hosseini (IRI)	85	91	92	88	73	83	512		
48	Ali Abdulqawi (BRN)	87	93	97	81	70	77	505		
—	Sergey Babikov (TJK)							DNS		
—	Lkhagvaagiin Undralbat (MGL)							DNS		
—	Nathaniel Padilla (PHI)							DNS		
