= Shooting at the 2006 Asian Games – Men's 25 metre rapid fire pistol team =

Men's 25 metre rapid fire pistol team at the 2006 Asian Games
- Venue: Lusail Shooting Range
- Dates: 6 December 2006
- Competitors: 33 from 11 nations

Medalists
gold medal	China; Liu Guohui, Liu Zhongsheng, Zhang Penghui
silver medal	Japan; Teruyoshi Akiyama, Shigefumi Harada, Tomohiro Kida
bronze medal	Kazakhstan; Igor Shmotkin, Sergey Vokhmyanin, Vladimir Vokhmyanin

The men's 25 metre rapid fire pistol team competition at the 2006 Asian Games in Doha, Qatar was held on 6 December at the Lusail Shooting Range.

== Schedule ==
All times are Arabia Standard Time (UTC+03:00)

Date	Time	Event
Wednesday, 6 December 2006	08:00	Stage 1
Wednesday, 6 December 2006	10:30	Stage 2

== Records ==
Prior to this competition, the existing world, Asian and Games records were as follows.

World Record	China	1743	Zagreb, Croatia	29 July 2006
Asian Record	China	1743	Zagreb, Croatia	29 July 2006
Games Record	—	—	—	—

== Results ==
Rank	Team	Stage 1			Stage 2			Total	Notes
Rank	Team	8	6	4	8	6	4	Total	Notes
1st place, gold medalist(s)	China (CHN)	297	294	280	292	295	280	1738	GR
	Liu Guohui	99	99	89	99	100	93	579	
	Liu Zhongsheng	99	100	92	97	99	92	579	
	Zhang Penghui	99	95	99	96	96	95	580	
2nd place, silver medalist(s)	Japan (JPN)	294	284	280	293	294	276	1721	
	Teruyoshi Akiyama	98	98	93	98	99	91	577	
	Shigefumi Harada	98	90	94	97	96	92	567	
	Tomohiro Kida	98	96	93	98	99	93	577	
3rd place, bronze medalist(s)	Kazakhstan (KAZ)	294	288	274	290	292	282	1720	
	Igor Shmotkin	97	97	89	95	97	97	572	
	Sergey Vokhmyanin	98	96	91	98	98	92	573	
	Vladimir Vokhmyanin	99	95	94	97	97	93	575	
4	India (IND)	293	288	279	293	291	270	1714	
	Vijay Kumar	95	98	93	98	98	95	577	
	Rahul Panwar	100	92	94	96	97	84	563	
	Pemba Tamang	98	98	92	99	96	91	574	
5	South Korea (KOR)	287	288	284	292	289	267	1707	
	Hong Seong-hwan	95	97	96	100	95	85	568	
	Hwang Yoon-sam	98	95	92	95	95	89	564	
	Lee Young-hoon	94	96	96	97	99	93	575	
6	Hong Kong (HKG)	285	281	275	291	286	274	1692	
	Li Hao Jian	92	97	89	97	95	87	557	
	Wong Fai	98	94	95	95	95	93	570	
	Yam Fong Hoi	95	90	91	99	96	94	565	
7	Vietnam (VIE)	288	273	258	286	284	273	1662	
	Lê Doãn Cường	95	90	88	96	92	90	551	
	Nguyễn Huy Quang Phúc	99	90	89	94	96	94	562	
	Trịnh Quốc Việt	94	93	81	96	96	89	549	
8	Thailand (THA)	283	277	262	290	282	263	1657	
	Pongpol Kulchairattana	98	91	85	96	96	89	555	
	Jakkrit Panichpatikum	99	92	90	99	95	87	562	
	Natthapong Sriyaepan	86	94	87	95	91	87	540	
9	Pakistan (PAK)	284	263	264	285	281	269	1646	
	Afsar Khan	96	73	89	93	97	91	539	
	Mustaqeem Shah	95	96	92	97	91	88	559	
	Maqbool Tabassum	93	94	83	95	93	90	548	
10	Qatar (QAT)	266	278	235	278	281	258	1596	
	Maed Al-Gazi	90	91	92	90	92	81	536	
	Zafer Al-Qahtani	90	91	84	94	93	90	542	
	Riaz Khan	86	96	59	94	96	87	518	
11	Bahrain (BRN)	260	257	218	272	267	217	1491	
	Juma Abdulaziz	91	91	73	96	92	78	521	
	Sami Saleh Mohamed	88	89	87	96	93	91	544	
	Ashban Sulaiman	81	77	58	80	82	48	426	
