= Shooting at the 2006 Asian Games – Men's 25 metre standard pistol =

Men's 25 metre standard pistol at the 2006 Asian Games
- Venue: Lusail Shooting Range
- Dates: 7 December 2006
- Competitors: 51 from 22 nations

Medalists
gold medal	Jaspal Rana	India
silver medal	Park Byung-taek	South Korea
bronze medal	Vladimir Issachenko	Kazakhstan

The men's 25 metre standard pistol competition at the 2006 Asian Games in Doha, Qatar was held on 7 December at the Lusail Shooting Range.

== Schedule ==
All times are Arabia Standard Time (UTC+03:00)

Date	Time	Event
Thursday, 7 December 2006	08:00	Final

== Records ==
Prior to this competition, the existing world, Asian and Games records were as follows.

World Record	Erich Buljung (USA)	584	Caracas, Venezuela	20 August 1983
Asian Record	Liu Guohui (CHN)	580	Kuala Lumpur, Malaysia	17 February 2004
Games Record	Opas Ruengpanyawut (THA)	579	Busan, South Korea	8 October 2002

== Results ==
Legend

- DNS — Did not start

Rank	Athlete	150 Sec		20 Sec		10 Sec		Total	S-off	Notes
Rank	Athlete	1	2	1	2	1	2	Total	S-off	Notes
1st place, gold medalist(s)	Jaspal Rana (IND)	96	96	94	96	94	98	574		
2nd place, silver medalist(s)	Park Byung-taek (KOR)	95	98	92	95	96	95	571		
3rd place, bronze medalist(s)	Vladimir Issachenko (KAZ)	94	98	93	95	93	97	570	46	
4	Liu Guohui (CHN)	96	96	98	95	93	92	570	45	
5	Jakkrit Panichpatikum (THA)	98	97	93	96	93	92	569		
6	Sergey Vokhmyanin (KAZ)	97	97	94	96	93	90	567		
7	Dilshod Mukhtarov (UZB)	96	98	94	95	89	94	566		
8	Nguyễn Mạnh Tường (VIE)	96	98	94	94	89	94	565		
9	Kim Jong-su (PRK)	97	96	91	97	91	93	565		
10	Liu Zhongsheng (CHN)	94	97	96	97	85	95	564		
11	Hwang Yoon-sam (KOR)	95	94	97	94	94	90	564		
12	Opas Ruengpanyawut (THA)	91	96	94	95	91	96	563		
13	Phạm Cao Sơn (VIE)	94	97	93	94	94	91	563		
14	Jang Dae-kyu (KOR)	97	97	91	94	93	89	561		
15	Shigefumi Harada (JPN)	95	93	96	94	89	92	559		
16	Mohammad Zein (SYR)	98	93	92	94	91	91	559		
17	Teruyoshi Akiyama (JPN)	95	96	94	93	87	93	558		
18	Ronak Pandit (IND)	97	95	88	95	91	92	558		
19	Samaresh Jung (IND)	96	92	97	93	90	90	558		
20	Kim Hyon-ung (PRK)	91	99	97	94	85	91	557		
21	Trịnh Quốc Việt (VIE)	95	96	91	90	94	90	556		
22	Riaz Khan (QAT)	93	95	91	92	91	92	554		
23	Pongpol Kulchairattana (THA)	98	96	89	90	90	91	554		
24	Lkhagvaagiin Undralbat (MGL)	89	95	95	96	88	90	553		
25	Li Hao Jian (HKG)	91	92	92	92	93	92	552		
26	Ryu Myong-yon (PRK)	96	96	92	83	87	96	550		
27	Chio Hong Chi (MAC)	92	91	94	93	86	94	550		
28	Mustaqeem Shah (PAK)	92	95	94	89	89	88	547		
29	Hadij Hatem (SYR)	94	92	89	88	89	94	546		
30	Sergey Babikov (TJK)	97	90	94	91	83	91	546		
31	Wong Fai (HKG)	94	99	88	90	82	92	545		
32	Yam Fong Hoi (HKG)	91	92	92	94	85	90	544		
33	Vladimir Vokhmyanin (KAZ)	92	96	87	87	90	91	543		
34	Zafer Al-Qahtani (QAT)	96	89	89	86	95	88	543		
35	Tomohiro Kida (JPN)	97	97	98	69	86	94	541		
36	Lai Iat Man (MAC)	91	91	92	85	93	89	541		
37	Zhang Tian (CHN)	93	95	90	92	84	87	541		
38	Maqbool Tabassum (PAK)	91	93	92	89	83	91	539		
39	Irshad Ali (PAK)	95	97	89	87	86	85	539		
40	Khalid Ahmed Mohamed (BRN)	95	97	93	96	77	79	537		
41	Said Al-Hasani (OMA)	94	90	87	91	91	82	535		
42	Salem Al-Marri (QAT)	91	93	91	91	75	90	531		
43	Adib Issa (SYR)	88	93	88	88	84	83	524		
44	Paul Saikali (LIB)	89	91	85	88	87	82	522		
45	Edirisinghe Senanayake (SRI)	96	91	77	90	79	83	516		
46	Leong Chi Kin (MAC)	92	90	83	83	86	80	514		
47	Adel Al-Asad (BRN)	92	94	88	83	75	81	513		
48	Fahriddin Sirodjiddinov (TJK)	86	90	84	91	83	74	508		
49	Sami Saleh Mohamed (BRN)	87	91	76	72	69	74	469		
—	Vladimir Grigoriev (KGZ)							DNS		
—	Nathaniel Padilla (PHI)							DNS		
