= India at the 2016 Asian Olympic Shooting Qualifying Tournament =

- IOC code: IND

in New Delhi, India 27 January 2016 – 3 February 2016
- Competitors: 64 in 15 events
- Medals Ranked 5th: Gold 1 Silver 1 Bronze 2 Total 4

A total of 64 Indian shooters participated in the 2016 Asian Olympic Shooting Qualifying Tournament held in Dr. Karni Singh Shooting Range, New Delhi. India ranked 5th in the medal list.

A total of 4 quotas have been obtained in three different events till 1 February.

== Participants ==
Ranks in bold red indicates 2016 Olympic Quota places.

=== Men ===
| Participants | Events | Qualification | Final | Rank | References |
|---|---|---|---|---|---|
| Sanjeev Rajput | 50 m Rifle Three Positions | 1163 - 60x | 429.5 | **4** | |
| Surendra Sinh Rathod | 50 m Rifle Three Positions | 1148 - 42x | did not advance | 16 | |
| Satyendra Singh | 50 m Rifle Three Positions | 1145 - 40x | did not advance | 20 | |
| Chain Singh | 50 m Rifle Three Positions | 1171 - 62x | MQS Extra | | |
| Swapnil Kusale | 50 m Rifle Three Positions | 1169 - 50x | MQS Extra | | |
| Swapnil Kusale | 50 m Rifle Prone | 617.2 | did not advance | 14 | |
| Sushil Ghalay | 50 m Rifle Prone | 616.6 | did not advance | 17 | |
| Surendra Sinh Rathod | 50 m Rifle Prone | 615.9 | did not advance | 14 | |
| Chain Singh | 50 m Rifle Prone | 622.9 | MQS Extra | | |
| Sanjeev Rajput | 50 m Rifle Prone | 618.3 | MQS Extra | | |
| Akhil Sheoran | 10 m Air Rifle | 620.1 | 163.0 | 4 | |
| Prashant | 10 m Air Rifle | 619.4 | did not advance | 11 | |
| Satyendra Singh | 10 m Air Rifle | 617.1 | did not advance | 21 | |
| Chain Singh | 10 m Air Rifle | 626.4 | MQS Extra | | |
| Gagan Narang | 10 m Air Rifle | 624.4 | MQS Extra | | |
| Omkar Singh | 50 m Pistol | 556 - 12x | 147.0 | 4 | |
| Jai Singh | 50 m Pistol | 541 - 07x | did not advance | 27 | |
| Prakash Nanjappa | 50 m Pistol | 534 - 06x | did not advance | 30 | |
| Samaresh Jung | 50 m Pistol | 552 - 10x | MQS Extra | | |
| Gurpal Singh | 50 m Pistol | 541 - 04x | MQS Extra | | |
| Vijay Kumar | 25 m Rapid Fire Pistol | 576 - 18x | 14 | 5 | |
| Neeraj Kumar | 25 m Rapid Fire Pistol | 556 - 13x | did not advance | 14 | |
| Harpreet Singh | 25 m Rapid Fire Pistol | 556 - 09x | did not advance | 15 | |
| Gurpreet Singh | 25 m Rapid Fire Pistol | 581 - 22x | MQS Extra | | |
| Akshay Suhas Ashtaputre | 25 m Rapid Fire Pistol | 564 - 17x | MQS Extra | | |
| Omkar Singh | 10 m Air Pistol | 577 - 15x | 94.6 | 7 | |
| Aman Pathania | 10 m Air Pistol | 570 - 14x | did not advance | 20 | |
| Jitendra Shivaji Vibhute | 10 m Air Pistol | 568 - 13x | did not advance | 25 | |
| Gurpreet Singh | 10 m Air Pistol | 582 - 14x | MQS Extra | | |
| Prakash Nanjappa | 10 m Air Pistol | 573 - 17x | MQS Extra | | |
| Kynan Chenai | Trap | 120 | 13 | **4** | |
| Manavjit Singh Sandhu | Trap | 118 | did not advance | 9 | |
| Prithviraj Tondaiman | Trap | 117 | did not advance | 10 | |
| Zoravar Singh Sandhu | Trap | 120 | MQS Extra | | |
| Anwer Sultan | Trap | 118 | MQS Extra | | |
| Angad Vir Singh Bajwa | Skeet | 118 | did not advance | 8 | |
| Man Singh | Skeet | 116 | did not advance | 17 | |
| Amrinder Cheema | Skeet | 112 | did not advance | 25 | |
| Sheeraz Sheikh | Skeet | 114 | MQS Extra | | |
| Smit Singh | Skeet | 113 | MQS Extra | | |
| Mohd Asab | Double Trap | 142 | 26 | 3rd place, bronze medalist(s) | |
| Ankur Mittal | Double Trap | 141 | 25 | 5 | |
| Ronjan Sodhi | Double Trap | 126 | did not advance | 16 | |
| Yoginderpal Singh | Double Trap | 139 | MQS Extra | | |
| Sangram Dahiya | Double Trap | 136 | MQS Extra | | |

=== Women ===
| Participants | Events | Qualification | Final | Rank | References |
|---|---|---|---|---|---|
| Elizabeth Susan Koshy | 50 m Rifle Three Positions | 580 - 23x | 430.5 | 4 | |
| Lajja Gauswami | 50 m Rifle Three Positions | 567 - 22x | did not advance | 26 | |
| Anjum Moudgil | 50 m Rifle Three Positions | 564 - 21x | did not advance | 30 | |
| Gaayathri Nithyanandam | 50 m Rifle Three Positions | 564 - 17x | MQS Extra | | |
| Anuja Jung | 50 m Rifle Three Positions | 558 - 16x | MQS Extra | | |
| Ayonika Paul | 10 m Air Rifle | 416.6 | 205.9 | **2** (silver) | |
| Pooja Ghatkar | 10 m Air Rifle | 415.6 | 184.5 | 3rd place, bronze medalist(s) | |
| Elizabeth Susan Koshy | 10 m Air Rifle | 413.6 | did not advance | 13 | |
| Anjali Bhagwat | 10 m Air Rifle | 413.1 | MQS Extra | | |
| Shriyanka Sadangi | 10 m Air Rifle | 412.5 | MQS Extra | | |
| Heena Sidhu | 10 m Air Pistol | 387 - 12x | 199.4 | **1** | |
| Yashaswini Singh Deswal | 10 m Air Pistol | 378 - 07x | did not advance | 11 | |
| Shweta Singh | 10 m Air Pistol | 378 - 04x | did not advance | 12 | |
| Shri Nivetha Paramanantham | 10 m Air Pistol | 378 - 11x | MQS Extra | | |
| Malaika Goel | 10 m Air Pistol | 377 - 08x | MQS Extra | | |
| Rahi Sarnobat | 25 m Pistol | 575 - 13x | did not advance | 12 | |
| Anisa Sayyed | 25 m Pistol | 572 - 15x | did not advance | 17 | |
| Annu Raj Singh | 25 m Pistol | 570 - 15x | did not advance | 21 | |
| Heena Sidhu | 25 m Pistol | 574 - 22x | MQS Extra | | |
| Gauri Sheoran | 25 m Pistol | 570 - 12x | MQS Extra | | |
| Shreyasi Singh | Trap | 69+0 | did not advance | 8 | |
| Rajeshwari Kumari | Trap | 68 | did not advance | 12 | |
| Shagun CHowdhury | Trap | 67 | did not advance | 14 | |
| Snehlata Singh Rajawat | Trap | 63 | MQS Extra | | |
| Seema Tomar | Trap | 63 | MQS Extra | | |
| Arti Singh Rao | Skeet | 69 | 10 | 6 | |
| Saniya Sheikh | Skeet | 68+2 | 11 | 4 | |
| Rashmee Rathore | Skeet | 61 | did not advance | 16 | |
| Maheshwari Chauhan | Skeet | 65 | MQS Extra | | |
| Shambhavi Kumari | Skeet | DNS | MQS Extra | | |

== Quota Obtained ==
| Player | Event | Rank in Olympics | |
| Player | Event | 2012 | 2016 |
|---|---|---|---|
| Sanjeev Rajput | 50 m Rifle Three Positions M | 26 | |
| Ayonika Paul | 10 m Air Rifle W | NA | |
| Heena Sidhu | 10 m Air Pistol W | 12 | |
| Kynan Chenai | Trap M | NA | |
