= Shooting at the 2006 Asian Games – Men's 25 metre center fire pistol team =

Men's 25 metre center fire pistol team at the 2006 Asian Games
- Venue: Lusail Shooting Range
- Dates: 8 December 2006
- Competitors: 45 from 15 nations

Medalists
gold medal	India; Samaresh Jung, Vijay Kumar, Jaspal Rana
silver medal	South Korea; Hong Seong-hwan, Jang Dae-kyu, Park Byung-taek
bronze medal	China; Liu Guohui, Liu Zhongsheng, Zhang Penghui

The men's 25 metre center-fire pistol team competition at the 2006 Asian Games in Doha, Qatar was held on 8 December at the Lusail Shooting Range.

== Schedule ==
All times are Arabia Standard Time (UTC+03:00)

Date	Time	Event
Friday, 8 December 2006	08:00	Final

== Records ==
Prior to this competition, the existing world, Asian and Games records were as follows.

World Record	Soviet Union	1762	Moscow, Soviet Union	15 August 1990
Asian Record	South Korea	1760	Lahti, Finland	14 July 2002
Games Record	North Korea; South Korea	1749	Bangkok, Thailand	13 December 1998

== Results ==
Rank	Team	Precision			Rapid			Total	Notes
Rank	Team	1	2	3	1	2	3	Total	Notes
1st place, gold medalist(s)	India (IND)	289	288	290	293	291	297	1748	
	Samaresh Jung	95	95	97	96	95	100	578	
	Vijay Kumar	96	95	95	97	98	99	580	
	Jaspal Rana	98	98	98	100	98	98	590	
2nd place, silver medalist(s)	South Korea (KOR)	285	289	290	287	290	297	1738	
	Hong Seong-hwan	97	96	98	93	98	98	580	
	Jang Dae-kyu	92	96	97	95	95	99	574	
	Park Byung-taek	96	97	95	99	97	100	584	
3rd place, bronze medalist(s)	China (CHN)	286	293	286	284	292	294	1735	
	Liu Guohui	95	99	95	99	99	100	587	
	Liu Zhongsheng	96	97	97	91	95	96	572	
	Zhang Penghui	95	97	94	94	98	98	576	
4	Japan (JPN)	293	291	291	283	291	284	1733	
	Teruyoshi Akiyama	97	96	95	94	99	97	578	
	Tomohiro Kida	98	98	96	96	96	94	578	
	Susumu Kobayashi	98	97	100	93	96	93	577	
5	Kazakhstan (KAZ)	287	286	287	291	287	290	1728	
	Vladimir Issachenko	96	97	97	94	91	93	568	
	Sergey Vokhmyanin	98	95	95	97	97	98	580	
	Vladimir Vokhmyanin	93	94	95	100	99	99	580	
6	North Korea (PRK)	295	289	290	285	285	282	1726	
	Kim Hyon-ung	97	95	95	96	96	95	574	
	Kim Jong-su	100	97	97	97	96	94	581	
	Ryu Myong-yon	98	97	98	92	93	93	571	
7	Vietnam (VIE)	287	289	287	278	291	284	1716	
	Hoàng Xuân Vinh	97	97	96	94	100	98	582	
	Nguyễn Mạnh Tường	94	96	96	95	96	98	575	
	Phạm Cao Sơn	96	96	95	89	95	88	559	
8	Thailand (THA)	282	283	287	285	288	289	1714	
	Prakarn Karndee	89	92	95	94	95	96	561	
	Jakkrit Panichpatikum	96	99	98	99	95	99	586	
	Opas Ruengpanyawut	97	92	94	92	98	94	567	
9	Pakistan (PAK)	281	285	283	285	283	288	1705	
	Irshad Ali	96	97	92	95	93	92	565	
	Muhammad Boota	93	92	96	93	93	97	564	
	Mustaqeem Shah	92	96	95	97	97	99	576	
10	Qatar (QAT)	279	284	280	280	284	283	1690	
	Maed Al-Gazi	94	96	92	90	94	97	563	
	Zafer Al-Qahtani	90	96	94	95	96	94	565	
	Riaz Khan	95	92	94	95	94	92	562	
11	Syria (SYR)	277	286	275	282	278	291	1689	
	Hadij Hatem	89	100	90	92	93	95	559	
	Adib Issa	96	94	91	95	89	97	562	
	Mohammad Zein	92	92	94	95	96	99	568	
12	Saudi Arabia (KSA)	276	292	286	264	283	275	1676	
	Mohammed Al-Amri	90	96	95	83	97	96	557	
	Hadi Al-Qahtani	93	98	99	91	94	93	568	
	Saied Al-Qahtani	93	98	92	90	92	86	551	
13	Iran (IRI)	273	282	285	277	266	275	1658	
	Ebrahim Barkhordari	92	95	95	95	97	92	566	
	Hossein Hosseini	85	91	92	88	73	83	512	
	Mohsen Nasr Esfahani	96	96	98	94	96	100	580	
14	Macau (MAC)	271	280	277	271	284	270	1653	
	Chio Hong Chi	88	91	93	94	96	91	553	
	Leong Chi Kin	91	95	92	91	97	92	558	
	Tang Pak Kou	92	94	92	86	91	87	542	
15	Bahrain (BRN)	273	280	284	272	249	254	1612	
	Ali Abdulqawi	87	93	97	81	70	77	505	
	Adel Al-Asad	90	90	91	97	86	82	536	
	Khalid Ahmed Mohamed	96	97	96	94	93	95	571	
