= Shooting at the 2006 Asian Games – Men's 25 metre standard pistol team =

Men's 25 metre standard pistol team at the 2006 Asian Games
- Venue: Lusail Shooting Range
- Dates: 7 December 2006
- Competitors: 42 from 14 nations

Medalists
| gold medal | South Korea; Hwang Yoon-sam, Jang Dae-kyu, Park Byung-taek |
| silver medal | India; Samaresh Jung, Ronak Pandit, Jaspal Rana |
| bronze medal | Thailand; Pongpol Kulchairattana, Jakkrit Panichpatikum, Opas Ruengpanyawut |

The men's 25 metre standard pistol team competition at the 2006 Asian Games in Doha, Qatar was held on 7 December at the Lusail Shooting Range.

== Schedule ==
All times are Arabia Standard Time (UTC+03:00)

| Date | Time | Event |
|---|---|---|
| Thursday, 7 December 2006 | 08:00 | Final |

== Records ==
Prior to this competition, the existing world, Asian and Games records were as follows.

| World Record | Soviet Union | 1725 | Osijek, Yugoslavia | 10 September 1985 |
| Asian Record | China | 1724 | Busan, South Korea | 8 October 2002 |
| Games Record | China | 1724 | Busan, South Korea | 8 October 2002 |

== Results ==
| Rank | Team | 150 Sec | | 20 Sec | | 10 Sec | | Total | Notes |
| Rank | Team | 1 | 2 | 1 | 2 | 1 | 2 | Total | Notes |
|---|---|---|---|---|---|---|---|---|---|
| 1st place, gold medalist(s) | South Korea (KOR) | 287 | 289 | 280 | 283 | 283 | 274 | 1696 | |
| | Hwang Yoon-sam | 95 | 94 | 97 | 94 | 94 | 90 | 564 | |
| | Jang Dae-kyu | 97 | 97 | 91 | 94 | 93 | 89 | 561 | |
| | Park Byung-taek | 95 | 98 | 92 | 95 | 96 | 95 | 571 | |
| 2nd place, silver medalist(s) | India (IND) | 289 | 283 | 279 | 284 | 275 | 280 | 1690 | |
| | Samaresh Jung | 96 | 92 | 97 | 93 | 90 | 90 | 558 | |
| | Ronak Pandit | 97 | 95 | 88 | 95 | 91 | 92 | 558 | |
| | Jaspal Rana | 96 | 96 | 94 | 96 | 94 | 98 | 574 | |
| 3rd place, bronze medalist(s) | Thailand (THA) | 287 | 289 | 276 | 281 | 274 | 279 | 1686 | |
| | Pongpol Kulchairattana | 98 | 96 | 89 | 90 | 90 | 91 | 554 | |
| | Jakkrit Panichpatikum | 98 | 97 | 93 | 96 | 93 | 92 | 569 | |
| | Opas Ruengpanyawut | 91 | 96 | 94 | 95 | 91 | 96 | 563 | |
| 4 | Vietnam (VIE) | 285 | 291 | 278 | 278 | 277 | 275 | 1684 | |
| | Nguyễn Mạnh Tường | 96 | 98 | 94 | 94 | 89 | 94 | 565 | |
| | Phạm Cao Sơn | 94 | 97 | 93 | 94 | 94 | 91 | 563 | |
| | Trịnh Quốc Việt | 95 | 96 | 91 | 90 | 94 | 90 | 556 | |
| 5 | Kazakhstan (KAZ) | 283 | 291 | 274 | 278 | 276 | 278 | 1680 | |
| | Vladimir Issachenko | 94 | 98 | 93 | 95 | 93 | 97 | 570 | |
| | Sergey Vokhmyanin | 97 | 97 | 94 | 96 | 93 | 90 | 567 | |
| | Vladimir Vokhmyanin | 92 | 96 | 87 | 87 | 90 | 91 | 543 | |
| 6 | China (CHN) | 283 | 288 | 284 | 284 | 262 | 274 | 1675 | |
| | Liu Guohui | 96 | 96 | 98 | 95 | 93 | 92 | 570 | |
| | Liu Zhongsheng | 94 | 97 | 96 | 97 | 85 | 95 | 564 | |
| | Zhang Tian | 93 | 95 | 90 | 92 | 84 | 87 | 541 | |
| 7 | North Korea (PRK) | 284 | 291 | 280 | 274 | 263 | 280 | 1672 | |
| | Kim Hyon-ung | 91 | 99 | 97 | 94 | 85 | 91 | 557 | |
| | Kim Jong-su | 97 | 96 | 91 | 97 | 91 | 93 | 565 | |
| | Ryu Myong-yon | 96 | 96 | 92 | 83 | 87 | 96 | 550 | |
| 8 | Japan (JPN) | 287 | 286 | 288 | 256 | 262 | 279 | 1658 | |
| | Teruyoshi Akiyama | 95 | 96 | 94 | 93 | 87 | 93 | 558 | |
| | Shigefumi Harada | 95 | 93 | 96 | 94 | 89 | 92 | 559 | |
| | Tomohiro Kida | 97 | 97 | 98 | 69 | 86 | 94 | 541 | |
| 9 | Hong Kong (HKG) | 276 | 283 | 272 | 276 | 260 | 274 | 1641 | |
| | Li Hao Jian | 91 | 92 | 92 | 92 | 93 | 92 | 552 | |
| | Wong Fai | 94 | 99 | 88 | 90 | 82 | 92 | 545 | |
| | Yam Fong Hoi | 91 | 92 | 92 | 94 | 85 | 90 | 544 | |
| 10 | Syria (SYR) | 280 | 278 | 269 | 270 | 264 | 268 | 1629 | |
| | Hadij Hatem | 94 | 92 | 89 | 88 | 89 | 94 | 546 | |
| | Adib Issa | 88 | 93 | 88 | 88 | 84 | 83 | 524 | |
| | Mohammad Zein | 98 | 93 | 92 | 94 | 91 | 91 | 559 | |
| 11 | Qatar (QAT) | 280 | 277 | 271 | 269 | 261 | 270 | 1628 | |
| | Salem Al-Marri | 91 | 93 | 91 | 91 | 75 | 90 | 531 | |
| | Zafer Al-Qahtani | 96 | 89 | 89 | 86 | 95 | 88 | 543 | |
| | Riaz Khan | 93 | 95 | 91 | 92 | 91 | 92 | 554 | |
| 12 | Pakistan (PAK) | 278 | 285 | 275 | 265 | 258 | 264 | 1625 | |
| | Irshad Ali | 95 | 97 | 89 | 87 | 86 | 85 | 539 | |
| | Mustaqeem Shah | 92 | 95 | 94 | 89 | 89 | 88 | 547 | |
| | Maqbool Tabassum | 91 | 93 | 92 | 89 | 83 | 91 | 539 | |
| 13 | Macau (MAC) | 275 | 272 | 269 | 261 | 265 | 263 | 1605 | |
| | Chio Hong Chi | 92 | 91 | 94 | 93 | 86 | 94 | 550 | |
| | Lai Iat Man | 91 | 91 | 92 | 85 | 93 | 89 | 541 | |
| | Leong Chi Kin | 92 | 90 | 83 | 83 | 86 | 80 | 514 | |
| 14 | Bahrain (BRN) | 274 | 282 | 257 | 251 | 221 | 234 | 1519 | |
| | Adel Al-Asad | 92 | 94 | 88 | 83 | 75 | 81 | 513 | |
| | Khalid Ahmed Mohamed | 95 | 97 | 93 | 96 | 77 | 79 | 537 | |
| | Sami Saleh Mohamed | 87 | 91 | 76 | 72 | 69 | 74 | 469 | |
