= 2016 Asian Olympic Shooting Qualifying Tournament =

2016 Asian Olympic Qualification
- Host city: New Delhi, India
- Nations: 30
- Events: 15
- Dates: Jan 27–Feb 3
- Main venue: Dr. Karni Singh Shooting Range

The 2016 Asian Olympic Shooting Qualifying Tournament was held in New Delhi, India between January 27 and February 3. This tournament was the Asian qualifying tournament for the 2016 Summer Olympics in Rio, after the 2015 Asian Shooting Championships was stripped of its status after the IOC suspended Kuwait NOC.

The National Rifle Association of India hosted this international competition at Dr. Karni Singh Shooting Range in New Delhi. The competition had three separate disciplines: Rifle, Pistol and Shotgun.

== Participating nations ==
A total of 538 shooters representing 30 countries participated in this event.

- India (64)(hosts)
- Bangladesh (15)
- Bhutan (1)
- Bahrain (5)
- Malaysia (28)
- China (15)
- Iran (26)
- Iraq (4)
- Japan (30)
- Kazakhstan (30)
- Kyrgyzstan (8)
- South Korea (59)
- Saudi Arabia (18)
- Athletes from Kuwait (10)
- Lebanon (7)
- Nepal (3)
- Pakistan (10)
- Philippines (9)
- North Korea (5)
- Qatar (22)
- Singapore (8)
- Sri Lanka (24)
- Syria (1)
- Thailand (34)
- Tajikistan (4)
- Vietnam (12)
- Chinese Taipei (27)
- Mongolia (17)
- United Arab Emirates (24)
- Uzbekistan (11)

== Medal summary ==
=== Rifle events ===
Rank	Individual	Team	Report	Rank	Individual	Team	Report
Men's 50 m Rifle Three Positions				Women's 50 m Rifle Three Positions			
1st place, gold medalist(s)	Kim Jong-hyun (KOR)	(South Korea)		1st place, gold medalist(s)	Xiang Wei Jasmine Ser	(Singapore)	
2nd place, silver medalist(s)	Yuriy Yurkov (KAZ)	(Kazakhstan)		2nd place, silver medalist(s)	Mahlagha Jambozorg	(Iran)	
3rd place, bronze medalist(s)	Toshikazu Yamashita (JPN)	(Japan)		3rd place, bronze medalist(s)	Kyerim Lee	(South Korea)	
Men's 50 m Rifle Prone				No Competition			
1st place, gold medalist(s)	Kim Jong-hyun (KOR)	(South Korea)		No Competition			
2nd place, silver medalist(s)	Attapon Vea Aree (THA)	(Thailand)		No Competition			
3rd place, bronze medalist(s)	Kim Hyeon-jun (KOR)	(South Korea)		No Competition			
Men's 10 m Air Rifle				Women's 10 m Air Rifle			
1st place, gold medalist(s)	Naoya Okada (JPN)	(Japan)		1st place, gold medalist(s)	Najmeh Khedmati (IRI)	(Iran)	
2nd place, silver medalist(s)	Yuriy Yurkov (KAZ)	(Kazakhstan)		2nd place, silver medalist(s)	Ayonika Paul (IND)	(India)	
3rd place, bronze medalist(s)	Pouria Norouzian (IRI)	(Iran)		3rd place, bronze medalist(s)	Pooja Ghatkar (IND)	(India)	

=== Pistol events ===
Rank	Individual	Team	Report	Rank	Individual	Team	Report
Men's 50 m Pistol				No Competition			
1st place, gold medalist(s)	Tomoyuki Matsuda (JPN)	(Japan)		No Competition			
2nd place, silver medalist(s)	Kim Song-Guk (PRK)	(North Korea)		No Competition			
3rd place, bronze medalist(s)	Kim Jong-su (PRK)	(North Korea)		No Competition			
Men's 25 m Rapid Fire Pistol				No Competition			
1st place, gold medalist(s)	Teruyoshi Akiyama (JPN)	(Japan)		No Competition			
2nd place, silver medalist(s)	Yong Hoo Choi (KOR)	(South Korea)		No Competition			
3rd place, bronze medalist(s)	Eita Mori (JPN)	(Japan)		No Competition			
Men's 10 m Air Pistol				Women's 10 m Air Pistol			
1st place, gold medalist(s)	Jonathan Wong (MAS)	(Malaysia)		1st place, gold medalist(s)	Heena Sidhu (IND)	(India)	
2nd place, silver medalist(s)	Atallah Alanazi (KSA)	(Saudi Arabia)		2nd place, silver medalist(s)	Tien Chia-chen (TPE)	(Chinese Taipei)	
3rd place, bronze medalist(s)	Kim Jong-su (PRK)	(North Korea)		3rd place, bronze medalist(s)	Kim Yun-mi (KOR)	(South Korea)	
Women's 25 m Pistol				No Competition			
1st place, gold medalist(s)	Koh Eun (KOR)	(South Korea)		No Competition			
2nd place, silver medalist(s)	Kim Min-jung (KOR)	(South Korea)		No Competition			
3rd place, bronze medalist(s)	Kim Ji-hye (KOR)	(South Korea)		No Competition			

=== ShotGun events ===
Rank	Individual	Team	Report	Rank	Individual	Team	Report
Trap Men				Trap Women			
1st place, gold medalist(s)	Abdulrahman Al Faihan (IOC)	(International Olympic Committee)		1st place, gold medalist(s)	Yukie Nakayama (JPN)	(Japan)	
2nd place, silver medalist(s)	Yang Kun Pi (TPE)	(Chinese Taipei)		2nd place, silver medalist(s)	Li Qingnian (CHN)	(China)	
3rd place, bronze medalist(s)	Talal Al-Rashidi (IOC)	(International Olympic Committee)		3rd place, bronze medalist(s)	Sarah Alhawal (IOC)	(International Olympic Committee)	
Skeet Men				Skeet Women			
1st place, gold medalist(s)	Saif Bin Futtais (UAE)	(United Arab Emirates)		1st place, gold medalist(s)	Naoko Ishihara (JPN)	(Japan)	
2nd place, silver medalist(s)	Saud Habib (IOC)	(International Olympic Committee)		2nd place, silver medalist(s)	Nutchaya Sutarporn (THA)	(Thailand)	
3rd place, bronze medalist(s)	Saeed Al Maktoum (UAE)	(United Arab Emirates)		3rd place, bronze medalist(s)	Kim Min-Ji (KOR)	(South Korea)	
Double Trap Men				No Competition			
1st place, gold medalist(s)	Khaled Alkaabi (UAE)	(United Arab Emirates)		No Competition			
2nd place, silver medalist(s)	Fehaid Al-Deehani (IOC)	(International Olympic Committee)		No Competition			
3rd place, bronze medalist(s)	Mohammed Asab (IND)	(India)		No Competition			

== Medal table ==
Final standing.

Rank	Nation	Gold	Silver	Bronze	Total
1	Japan	5	0	2	7
2	South Korea	3	2	5	10
3	United Arab Emirates	2	0	1	3
4	(International Olympic Committee) Independent Olympic Athlete	1	2	1	4
5	India	1	1	2	4
6	Iran	1	1	1	3
7	Singapore	1	0	0	1
7	Malaysia	1	0	0	1
9	Chinese Taipei	0	2	0	2
9	Thailand	0	2	0	2
9	Kazakhstan	0	2	0	2
12	North Korea	0	1	2	3
13	China	0	1	1	2
14	Saudi Arabia	0	1	0	1
Total		15	15	15	45

== 2016 Olympic Quota Obtained ==
Event	Athlete	Nation	References
Men's 50 m Rifle Three Positions	Sanjeev Rajput	India	
Men's 50 m Rifle Three Positions	Vitaliy Dovgun	Qatar	
Men's 50 m Rifle Three Positions	Napis Tortungpanich	Thailand	
Women's 50 m Rifle Three Positions	Jasmine Ser	Singapore	
Women's 50 m Rifle Three Positions	Mahlagha Jambozorg	Iran	
Women's 50 m Rifle Three Positions	Lee Kyerim	South Korea	
Men's 50 m Rifle Prone	Kim Jong-hyun	South Korea	
Men's 50 m Rifle Prone	Attapon Uea-aree	Thailand	
Men's 10 m Air Rifle	Naoya Okada	Japan	
Men's 10 m Air Rifle	Pouria Norouzian	Iran	
Women's 10 m Air Rifle	Ayonika Paul	India	
Women's 10 m Air Rifle	Lee Eun-seo	South Korea	
Men's 50 m Pistol	Kim Song-guk	North Korea	
Men's 50 m Pistol	Kim Jong-su	North Korea	
Men's 25 m Rapid Fire Pistol	Teruyoshi Akiyama	Japan	
Men's 25 m Rapid Fire Pistol	Eita Mori	Japan	
Men's 10 m Air Pistol	Jonathan Wong	Malaysia	
Men's 10 m Air Pistol	Atallah Alanazi	Saudi Arabia	
Women's 10 m Air Pistol	Heena Sidhu	India	
Women's 10 m Air Pistol	Golnoush Sebghatollahi	Iran	
Women's 25 m Pistol	Koh Eun	South Korea	
Women's 25 m Pistol	Akiko Sato	Japan	
Women's 25 m Pistol	Teo Shun Xie	Singapore	
Trap Men	Abdulrahman Al-Faihan	Athletes from Kuwait	
Trap Men	Yang Kun-pi	Chinese Taipei	
Trap Men	Kynan Chenai	India	
Trap Men	Andrey Mogilevskiy	Kazakhstan	
Trap Women	Li Qingnian	China	
Skeet Men	Abdullah Al-Rashidi	Athletes from Kuwait	
Skeet Men	Saud Habib	Athletes from Kuwait	
Skeet Men	Rashid Saleh Hamad	Qatar	
Skeet Men	Saeed Al Maktoum	United Arab Emirates	
Skeet Women	Naoko Ishihara	Japan	
Double Trap Men	Khaled Al-Kaabi	United Arab Emirates	
Double Trap Men	Fehaid Al-Deehani	Athletes from Kuwait	

== 2016 Olympic Quota Obtained by Nations and Independent Athletes ==
A total of 35 quota places for the Rio 2016 Olympic Games will be awarded based on this event.

Nation	Quota Obtained	No. Events
China	1	1
Chinese Taipei	1	1
India	4	4
Iran	3	3
Japan	5	4
Kazakhstan	1	1
Athletes from Kuwait	4	3
Malaysia	1	1
North Korea	2	1
Qatar	2	2
Saudi Arabia	1	1
Singapore	2	2
South Korea	4	4
Thailand	2	2
United Arab Emirates	2	2
Total	35	15

== Official website ==
- http://www.thenrai.in/
- ISSF Website
