= 2014 Asian Airgun Championships =

- Host city: Kuwait City, Kuwait
- Dates: 7–13 March 2014
- Main venue: Sheikh Sabah Al-Ahmad Olympic Shooting Complex

The 2014 Asian Airgun Championships were held at Sheikh Sabah Al-Ahmad Olympic Shooting Complex, Kuwait City, Kuwait between March 7 and March 13, 2014.

== Medal summary ==
=== Men ===
| Event | Gold | Silver | Bronze |
|---|---|---|---|
| 10 m air pistol | Pang Wei; China | Wang Zhiwei; China | Mai Jiajie; China |
| 10 m air pistol team | China; Mai Jiajie; Pang Wei; Wang Zhiwei | India; Samaresh Jung; Prakash Nanjappa; Jitu Rai | Saudi Arabia; Atallah Al-Anazi; Aqeel Al-Badrani; Safar Al-Dosari |
| 10 m air rifle | Chain Singh; India | Qin Cong; China | Liu Zhiguo; China |
| 10 m air rifle team | China; Liu Zhiguo; Pan Junhui; Qin Cong | Iran; Mehdi Ahmadi; Hossein Bagheri; Mohammad Zaer Rezaei | India; Ravi Kumar; P. T. Raghunath; Chain Singh |

=== Women ===
| Event | Gold | Silver | Bronze |
|---|---|---|---|
| 10 m air pistol | Heena Sidhu; India | Wu Chia-ying; Chinese Taipei | Wadha Al-Balushi; Oman |
| 10 m air pistol team | China; Huang Yamei; Ji Xiaojing; Su Yuling | India; Shweta Chaudhary; Heena Sidhu; Harveen Srao | Chinese Taipei; Tien Chia-chen; Tu Yi Yi-tzu; Wu Chia-ying |
| 10 m air rifle | Pooja Ghatkar; India | Du Bei; China | Yi Siling; China |
| 10 m air rifle team | China; Du Bei; Wu Liuxi; Yi Siling | Mongolia; Nergüin Angirmaa; Damdinsürengiin Lkhamsüren; Mandakhnaryn Tüvshinjargal | India; Apurvi Chandela; Pooja Ghatkar; Ayonika Paul |

== Medal table ==
| Rank | Nation | Gold | Silver | Bronze | Total |
|---|---|---|---|---|---|
| 1 | China | 5 | 3 | 3 | 11 |
| 2 | India | 3 | 2 | 2 | 7 |
| 3 | Chinese Taipei | 0 | 1 | 1 | 2 |
| 4 | Iran | 0 | 1 | 0 | 1 |
| 4 | Mongolia | 0 | 1 | 0 | 1 |
| 6 | Oman | 0 | 0 | 1 | 1 |
| 6 | Saudi Arabia | 0 | 0 | 1 | 1 |
| Totals (7 entries) | | 8 | 8 | 8 | 24 |
