= Shooting at the 2016 South Asian Games =

Shooting at the 2016 South Asian Games were held in Guwahati, India from 10 – 15 February 2016.

== Medalists ==
=== Men's events ===
Event	Gold	Silver	Bronze
Individual 10M Air Rifle	Chain Singh (IND)	Md. Sovon Chowdhury (BAN)	Gagan Narang (IND)
Team 10M Air Rifle	India; Gagan Narang; Chain Singh; Imran Hassan Khan	Bangladesh; Abdullah Hel Baki; Md. Sovon Chowdhury; Anjan Kumar Singha	Sri Lanka; SMM Samarakoon; WKY Krishantha; SMAU Samarakoon
Individual 10M Air Pistol	Omkar Singh (IND)	Kaleem Ullah (PAK)	Jitendra Vibhute (IND)
Team 10M Air Pistol	India; Omkar Singh; Gurpreet Singh; Jitendra Vibhute	Pakistan; Kalimullah Khan; Kaleem Ullah; Muhammad Shehzad Akhtar	Sri Lanka; S Fernando; MP Pathirana; DMSM Disanayake
Individual 25M Center Fire Pistol	Samaresh Jung (IND)	Pemba Tamang (IND)	Vijay Kumar (IND)
Team 25M Center Fire Pistol	India; Samaresh Jung; Pemba Tamang; Vijay Kumar	Pakistan; Ghulam Mustafa Bashir; Maqbool Hussain Tabassum; Muhammad Kabir	
Individual 25M Standard Pistol	Neeraj Kumar (IND)	Gurpreet Singh (IND)	Mahender Singh (IND)
Team 25M Standard Pistol	India; Neeraj Kumar; Gurpreet Singh; Mahender Singh	Pakistan; Maqbool Hussain Tabassum; Ghulam Mustafa Bashir; Muhammad Kabir	Sri Lanka; S Fernando; M P Pathirana; G S Walgama
Individual 25M Rapid Fire Pistol	Gurpreet Singh (IND)	Ghulam Mustafa Bashir (PAK)	Vijay Kumar (IND)
Team 25M Rapid Fire Pistol	India; Vijay Kumar; Gurpreet Singh; Akshay Suhas Asthaputre	Pakistan; Ghulam Mustafa Bashir; Maqbool Hussain Tabassum; Muhammad Khalil Akhtar	Sri Lanka; WMK Kumara; M P Pathirana; RKDDAS Rathnayaka
Individual 50M Pistol	Sakil Ahmed (BAN)	Om Prakash (IND)	Kalimullah Khan (PAK)
Team 50M Pistol	India; Omkar Singh; P N Prakash; Om Prakash	Pakistan; Kalimullah Khan; Muhammad Akhtar; Kallem Ullah	Bangladesh; Mohendra Singha; Sakil Ahmed; Md. Anwar Hossain
Individual 50M Rifle Prone	Chain Singh (IND)	Gagan Narang (IND)	Siddique Umar (PAK)
Team 50M Rifle Prone	India; Gagan Narang; Chain Singh; Surendra Singh Rathod	Pakistan; Siddique Umar; Midrar Ali; Amir Muhammad	Sri Lanka; SMM Samarakoon; WKY Krishantha; PHW Karunarathna
Individual 50M Rifle 3 Positions	Chain Singh (IND)	Gagan Narang (IND)	SMM Samarakoon (SRI)
Team 50M Rifle 3 Positions	India; Chain Singh; Gagan Narang; Surendra Singh Rathod	Sri Lanka; WKY Krishantha; SMM Samarakoon; HDP Kumara	Bangladesh; Golam Safiuddin Siplu; Md. Yousuf Ali; Md. Ramjan Ali

=== Women's events ===
Event	Gold	Silver	Bronze
Individual 10M Air Rifle	Apurvi Chandela (IND)	Elizabeth Susan Koshy (IND)	Pooja Ghatkar (IND)
Team 10M Air Rifle	India; Apurvi Chandela; Pooja Ghatkar; Elizabeth Susan Koshy	Sri Lanka; P Vasudevan; KKG Perera; WMSY Perera	Bangladesh; Suraiya Akhter; Ummey Jakia Sultana; Jui Chakma
Individual 10M Air Pistol	Sweta Singh (IND)	Heena Sidhu (IND)	Yashaswini Singh Deswal (IND)
Team 10M Air Pistol	India; Heena Sidhu; Yashaswini Singh Deswal; Sweta Singh	Bangladesh; Ardiina Ferdous; Armin Asha; Turing Dewan	Sri Lanka; R Abeymanna; KGAK Kariyawasam; KSCG Kendawala
Individual 25M Pistol	Rahi Sarnobat (IND)	Annuraj Singh (IND)	Anisa Sayyed (IND)
Team 25M Pistol	India; Rahi Sarnobat; Anisa Sayyed; Annuraj Singh	Sri Lanka; Aida Kulathunga; KSCG Kendawala; WANM Weerakkodi	Pakistan; Lubina Amin; Farhat Nasreen; Tazeem Akhtar
Individual 50M Rifle Prone	Kuheli Gangulee (IND)	Lajja Goswami (IND)	Anuja Jung (IND)
Team 50M Rifle Prone	India; Kuheli Gangulee; Lajja Goswami; Anuja Jung	Pakistan; Nadira Raees; Nazish Khan; Nadia Rashid	Sri Lanka; WMSY Perera; MGTUE Egodawela; WGJ Madushani
Individual 50M Rifle 3 Positions	Anjum Moudgil (IND)	Elizabeth Susan Koshy (IND)	Lajja Goswami (IND)
Team 50M Rifle 3 Positions	India; Anjum Moudgil; Elizabeth Susan Koshy; Lajja Goswami	Sri Lanka; WMSY Perera; KKG Perera; GGUN Ruparathna	Pakistan; Nazish Khan; Nadia Rashid; Nadira Raees

== Medal table ==
Rank	Nation	Gold	Silver	Bronze	Total
1	India (IND)	25	10	10	45
2	Bangladesh (BAN)	1	3	3	7
3	Pakistan (PAK)	0	9	4	13
4	Sri Lanka (SRI)	0	4	8	12
Totals (4 entries)		26	26	25	77
