= Kim Yun-mi =

Kim Yun-Mi may refer to:

- Kim Yun-mi (speed skater) (born 1980), South Korean short track speed skater
- Kim Yun-mi (table tennis) (born 1981), North Korean table tennis player
- Kim Yun-mi (sport shooter) (born 1982), South Korean sport shooter
- Kim Yun-mi (footballer) (born 1993), North Korean footballer
- Kim Yun-mi (field hockey)
- Kim Yun-mi (actress)
