= Shooting at the 2010 Commonwealth Games – Men's 50 metre pistol singles =

The Men's 50 metre pistol singles event took place at 6 October 2010 at the CRPF Campus. There were two qualification rounds held to determine the final participants.

== Results ==
Rank	Name	Qualif.	1	2	3	4	5	6	7	8	9	10	Final	Total
1st place, gold medalist(s)	Omkar Singh (IND)	557	9.7	10.4	10.7	10.1	7.8	7.8	9.5	10.5	10.1	10.0	96.6	653.6
2nd place, silver medalist(s)	Gai Bin (SIN)	558	8.8	9.9	9.5	6.9	10.3	8.0	9.6	9.7	9.9	9.0	91.6	649.6
3rd place, bronze medalist(s)	Lim Swee Hon Nigel (SIN)	551	8.0	7.9	10.6	8.7	9.9	9.9	10.3	9.4	9.5	9.5	93.7	644.7
4	Edirisinghe Senanayake (SRI)	544	9.7	7.8	8.7	9.7	9.5	10.2	9.7	10.0	9.2	9.8	94.3	638.3
5	Nick Baxter (ENG)	543	7.7	8.9	10.5	9.2	9.8	8.7	9.5	8.4	10.0	10.0	92.7	635.7
6	Kalim Khan (PAK)	540	9.3	10.2	10.0	9.3	9.2	9.6	9.9	9.2	8.6	8.9	94.2	634.2
7	Mick Gault (ENG)	542	7.4	9.3	5.6	9.6	10.1	9.4	9.1	9.8	10.6	9.4	90.3	632.3
8	David Moore (AUS)	543	8.1	10.3	10.1	10.1	7.8	8.8	9.5	6.0	10.1	6.2	87.0	630.0
