= Shooting at the 2010 Commonwealth Games – Men's 10 metre air pistol =

Shooting – Men's 10 metre air pistol at the 2010 Commonwealth Games
- Venue: Dr. Karni Singh Shooting Range
- Dates: 28 July 2014

The Men's 10 metre air pistol event took place at 7 October 2010 at the CRPF Campus. There was a qualification held to determine the final participants.

== Results ==
| Rank | Name | Country | 1 | 2 | 3 | 4 | 5 | 6 | Final | Total |
|---|---|---|---|---|---|---|---|---|---|---|
| 1st place, gold medalist(s) | Omkar Singh | India | 98 | 98 | 96 | 98 | 98 | 96 | 97.8 | 681.8 (EGR) |
| 2nd place, silver medalist(s) | Gai Bin | Singapore | 98 | 96 | 96 | 95 | 98 | 97 | 96.2 | 676.2 |
| 3rd place, bronze medalist(s) | Daniel Repacholi | Australia | 97 | 94 | 94 | 95 | 99 | 96 | 99.0 | 674.0 |
| 4 | Roger Daniel | Trinidad and Tobago | 96 | 97 | 95 | 98 | 97 | 94 | 96.1 | 673.1 |
| 5 | Gurpreet Singh | India | 94 | 94 | 97 | 95 | 99 | 95 | 97.7 | 671.7 |
| 6 | Mick Gault | England | 95 | 94 | 95 | 95 | 98 | 97 | 97.6 | 671.6 |
| 7 | Greg Yelavich | New Zealand | 93 | 96 | 94 | 95 | 97 | 95 | 98.4 | 668.4 |
| 8 | Kalim Khan | Pakistan | 94 | 95 | 96 | 95 | 94 | 96 | 97.0 | 667.0 |
