= 2012 Asian Airgun Championships =

- Host city: Nanchang, China
- Dates: 12–18 December 2012

The 2012 Asian Airgun Championships were held in Nanchang, China between December 12 and December 18, 2012.

== Medal summary ==
=== Men ===
Event	Gold	Silver	Bronze
10 m air pistol	Hoàng Xuân Vinh; Vietnam	Mai Jiajie; China	Shi Xinglong; China
10 m air pistol team	China; Mai Jiajie; Shi Xinglong; Yang Wei	Kazakhstan; Vladimir Issachenko; Vyacheslav Podlesniy; Rashid Yunusmetov	Vietnam; Hoàng Xuân Vinh; Nguyễn Hoàng Phương; Trần Quốc Cường
10 m air rifle	Cao Yifei; China	Wang Tao; China	Li Jie; China
10 m air rifle team	China; Cao Yifei; Li Jie; Wang Tao	Kazakhstan; Alexey Kleimyonov; Ratmir Mindiyarov; Igor Pirekeyev	Thailand; Varavut Majchacheep; Worawat Suriyajun; Chandaj Traidumrong

=== Women ===
Event	Gold	Silver	Bronze
10 m air pistol	Ren Jie; China	Wang Dehui; China	Su Yuling; China
10 m air pistol team	China; Ren Jie; Su Yuling; Wang Dehui	Chinese Taipei; Tu Yi Yi-tzu; Wu Chia-ying; Yu Ai-wen	India; Shweta Chaudhary; Annu Raj Singh; Harveen Srao
10 m air rifle	Yu Dan; China	Wu Liuxi; China	Anjali Bhagwat; India
10 m air rifle team	China; Chang Jing; Yu Dan; Wu Liuxi	India; Anjali Bhagwat; Mampi Das; Shriyanka Sadangi	Iran; Elaheh Ahmadi; Zahra Hashemi; Safieh Sahragard

== Medal table ==
Rank	Nation	Gold	Silver	Bronze	Total
1	China	7	4	3	14
2	Vietnam	1	0	1	2
3	Kazakhstan	0	2	0	2
4	India	0	1	2	3
5	Chinese Taipei	0	1	0	1
6	Iran	0	0	1	1
6	Thailand	0	0	1	1
Totals (7 entries)		8	8	8	24
