= Shooting at the 2010 Commonwealth Games – Men's 50 metre pistol pairs =

The Men's 50 metre pistol pairs event took place at 5 October 2010 at the CRPF Campus.

== Results ==
Rank	Name	Country	1	2	3	4	5	6	Ind. Total	Total
1st place, gold medalist(s)	Lim Swee Hon Nigel	Singapore	95	92	90	90	90	93	550^{8}	1094^{13}
1st place, gold medalist(s)	Gai Bin	Singapore	95	90	85	95	91	88	544^{5}	1094^{13}
2nd place, silver medalist(s)	Omkar Singh	India	93	92	92	93	91	87	548^{10}	1087^{19}
2nd place, silver medalist(s)	Deepak Sharma	India	84	93	89	93	89	91	539^{9}	1087^{19}
3rd place, bronze medalist(s)	Roger Daniel	Trinidad and Tobago	91	90	90	90	92	95	548^{8}	1081^{14}
3rd place, bronze medalist(s)	Rhodney Allen	Trinidad and Tobago	90	85	87	90	88	93	533^{6}	1081^{14}
4	David Moore	Australia	92	92	92	88	86	93	543^{11}	1080^{20}
4	Bruce Quick	Australia	85	94	89	92	91	86	537^{9}	1080^{20}
5	Mick Gault	England	93	95	89	90	88	83	538^{8}	1073^{14}
5	Nick Baxter	England	85	89	88	90	92	91	535^{6}	1073^{14}
6	Kalim Khan	Pakistan	91	91	95	92	88	92	549^{9}	1068^{18}
6	Irshad Ali	Pakistan	84	87	86	88	84	90	519^{9}	1068^{18}
7	Alais Sulong	Malaysia	84	85	87	93	89	89	527^{6}	1046^{11}
7	Hasli Amir Hasan	Malaysia	87	81	84	86	90	91	519^{5}	1046^{11}
8	Calvert Herbert	Barbados	82	83	92	85	88	87	517^{10}	1027^{15}
8	Bernard Chase	Barbados	78	88	90	81	88	85	510^{5}	1027^{15}
9	Alan Markewicz	Canada	79	88	87	92	82	88	516^{3}	1022^{9}
9	Sylvain Ouellette	Canada	87	84	85	84	83	83	506^{6}	1022^{9}
