= 2009 Asian Airgun Championships =

Sport shooting competition

- Host city: Doha, Qatar
- Dates: 16–22 December 2009

The 2009 Asian Airgun Championships were held in Doha, Qatar between December 16 and December 22, 2009. It acts as the Asian qualifying tournament for the 2010 Summer Youth Olympics in Singapore.

== Medal summary ==
=== Men ===
| Event | Gold | Silver | Bronze |
|---|---|---|---|
| 10 m air pistol | Shi Xinglong; China | Rashid Yunusmetov; Kazakhstan | Pu Qifeng; China |
| 10 m air pistol team | China; Mai Jiajie; Pu Qifeng; Shi Xinglong | India; Samaresh Jung; Zakir Khan; Omkar Singh | Iran; Ebrahim Barkhordari; Darab Dehghannejad; Mohsen Nasr Esfahani |
| 10 m air rifle | Gagan Narang; India | Zhu Qinan; China | Zhao Shengbo; China |
| 10 m air rifle team | India; Gagan Narang; P. T. Raghunath; Sanjeev Rajput | China; Zhang Bo; Zhao Shengbo; Zhu Qinan | Iran; Hossein Bagheri; Saber Parasti; Ahmad Shahmirzadi |

=== Women ===
| Event | Gold | Silver | Bronze |
|---|---|---|---|
| 10 m air pistol | Guo Wenjun; China | Tong Xin; China | Tien Chia-chen; Chinese Taipei |
| 10 m air pistol team | China; Guo Wenjun; Shan Wenrui; Tong Xin | Chinese Taipei; Lee Pei-ching; Tien Chia-chen; Tsai Chia-hui | India; Shweta Chaudhary; Heena Sidhu; Annu Raj Singh |
| 10 m air rifle | Yu Dan; China | Yi Siling; China | Jasmine Ser; Singapore |
| 10 m air rifle team | China; Ding Tingting; Yi Siling; Yu Dan | India; Priya Agarwal; Tejaswini Sawant; Suma Shirur | Singapore; Goh Jia Yi; Jasmine Ser; Aqilah Sudhir |

== Medal table ==
| Rank | Nation | Gold | Silver | Bronze | Total |
|---|---|---|---|---|---|
| 1 | China | 6 | 4 | 2 | 12 |
| 2 | India | 2 | 2 | 1 | 5 |
| 3 | Chinese Taipei | 0 | 1 | 1 | 2 |
| 4 | Kazakhstan | 0 | 1 | 0 | 1 |
| 5 | Iran | 0 | 0 | 2 | 2 |
| 5 | Singapore | 0 | 0 | 2 | 2 |
| Totals (6 entries) | | 8 | 8 | 8 | 24 |
