= Shooting at the 2010 Commonwealth Games – Men's 25 metre standard pistol pairs =

The Men's 25 metre standard pistol pairs event at the 2010 Commonwealth Games took place on 12 October 2010, at the CRPF Campus.

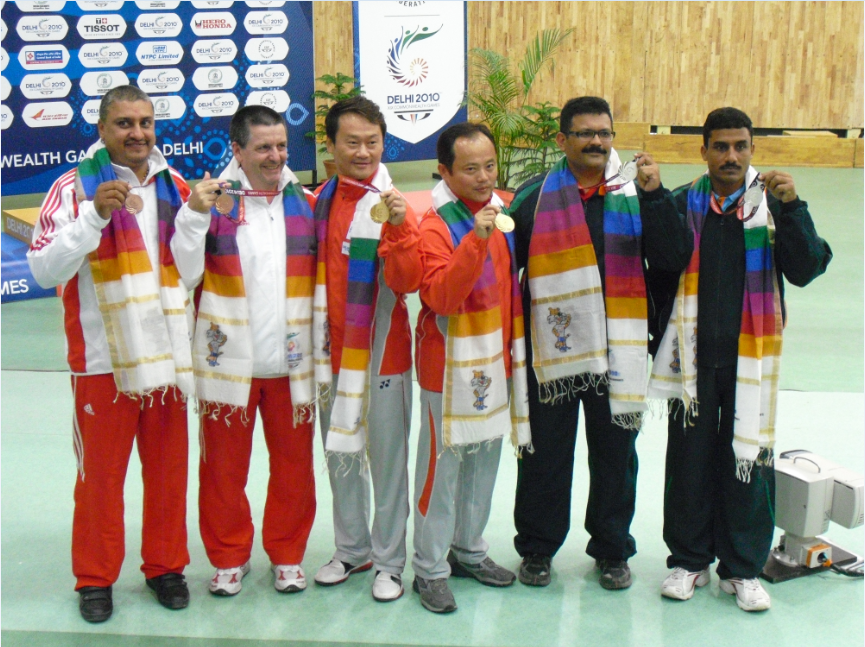
From the left: Iqbal Ubhi, Mick Gault, Gai Bin, Poh Lip Meng, Samaresh Jung, and Chandrashekar Chaudhary

== Results ==
Rank	Name	Country	150 sec	20 sec	10 sec	Ind. total	Total
1st place, gold medalist(s)	Gai Bin	Singapore	192	187	185	565^{15}	1116^{28}
1st place, gold medalist(s)	Poh Lip Meng	Singapore	194	188	170	552^{13}	1116^{28}
2nd place, silver medalist(s)	Samaresh Jung	India	195	183	183	561^{9}	1103^{18}
2nd place, silver medalist(s)	Chandrashekar Chaudhary	India	189	178	175	542^{9}	1103^{18}
3rd place, bronze medalist(s)	Mick Gault	England	191	182	181	554^{6}	1098^{18}
3rd place, bronze medalist(s)	Iqbal Ubhi	England	192	181	171	544^{12}	1098^{18}
4	Roger Daniel	Trinidad and Tobago	191	182	183	556^{11}	1096^{21}
4	Rhodney Allen	Trinidad and Tobago	187	182	171	540^{10}	1096^{21}
5	Christopher Roberts	Australia	191	178	180	549^{9}	1096^{14}
5	David Moore	Australia	188	175	184	547^{5}	1096^{14}
6	Hasli Amir	Malaysia	185	189	177	551^{8}	1089^{13}
6	Khalel Abdullah	Malaysia	188	172	178	538^{5}	1089^{13}
7	Mustaqeem Shah	Pakistan	188	186	173	547^{13}	1085^{17}
7	Irshad Ali	Pakistan	187	182	169	538^{4}	1085^{17}
8	Alan Green	Wales	185	178	176	539^{7}	1075^{13}
8	Steve Pengelly	Wales	193	172	171	536^{6}	1075^{13}
9	Junior Benskin	Barbados	189	181	171	541^{9}	1073^{15}
9	Chester Foster	Barbados	188	179	168	532^{6}	1073^{15}
10	Robert Doak	Northern Ireland	190	177	172	539^{10}	1064^{15}
10	Hugh Stewart	Northern Ireland	181	177	167	525^{5}	1064^{15}
11	Graham Cock	Norfolk Island	176	165	171	512^{6}	935^{8}
11	Graham Lock	Norfolk Island	137	137	149	423^{2}	935^{8}
