= Ri Hyon-ok (sport shooter) =

North Korean sport shooter

Personal information
- Full name: Ri Hyon-ok
- Nationality: North Korea
- Born: 13 January 1970 (age 56) Pyongyang, North Korea
- Height: 1.61 m (5 ft 3 1/2 in)
- Weight: 62 kg (137 lb)

Sport
- Sport: Shooting
- Event: Skeet (SK75)
Medal record
Women's shooting
Representing North Korea
Asian Championships
Gold medal – first place	2007 Kuwait City	Skeet team
Bronze medal – third place	2007 Kuwait City	Skeet

Korean name
- Hangul: 리현옥
- RR: Ri Hyeonok
- MR: Ri Hyŏnok

Ri Hyon-ok (Korean: 리현옥; born January 13, 1970, in Pyongyang) is a North Korean sport shooter. She won a bronze medal in skeet shooting at the 2007 Asian Shooting Championships in Kuwait City, Kuwait, and finished seventh at the 2004 Summer Olympics.

Ri qualified as the only female athlete for the North Korean shooting squad in the women's skeet at the 2004 Summer Olympics in Athens, by having registered a minimum qualifying score of 66 and obtaining a top four finish from the Asian Championships in Kuala Lumpur, Malaysia. Ri aggregated a total record of 68 out of 75 targets in the qualifying stage, but fell abruptly in a two-way shoot-off against U.S. shooter Kimberly Rhode by 2 to 1, leaving her in seventh out of twelve prospective shooters.
