= Jaspal Rana =

Indian sport shooter (1976–2026)

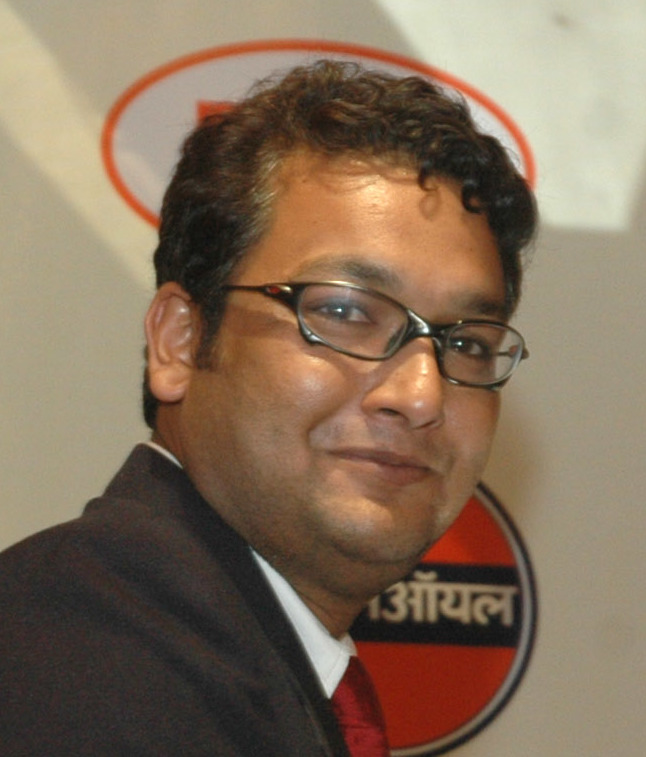
- Rana in 2007

Personal information
- Nationality: Indian
- Born: 28 June 1976 Tehri Garhwal, Uttarakhand, India
- Died: 12 June 2026 (aged 49) New Delhi, Delhi, India
- Height: 175 cm (5 ft 9 in)
- Spouse: Reena Rana (1997-2021)

Sport
- Country: India
- Sport: Shooting
- Events: 10 metre air pistol 25 metre center-fire pistol 25 metre standard pistol

Personal details
- Party: Indian National Congress (from 2012)
- Other political affiliations: Bharatiya Janata Party (until 2012)
Medal record
Men's shooting
Representing India
Event	1st	2nd	3rd
Asian Games	4	2	2
Commonwealth Games	9	4	2
Asian Championships	1	0	1
World Junior Championships	1	0	0
Total	15	6	5
Asian Games
Gold medal – first place	1994 Hiroshima	25 m center fire pistol
Gold medal – first place	2006 Doha	25 m center fire pistol
Gold medal – first place	2006 Doha	25 m center fire pistol team
Gold medal – first place	2006 Doha	25 m standard pistol
Silver medal – second place	1998 Bangkok	25 m center fire pistol
Silver medal – second place	2006 Doha	25 m standard pistol team
Bronze medal – third place	1994 Hiroshima	25 m center fire pistol team
Bronze medal – third place	1998 Bangkok	25 m center fire pistol team
Commonwealth Games
Gold medal – first place	1994 Victoria	25m centre fire pistol
Gold medal – first place	1994 Victoria	25m centre fire pistol pairs
Gold medal – first place	1998 Kuala Lumpur	25m centre fire pistol
Gold medal – first place	1998 Kuala Lumpur	25m centre fire pistol pairs
Gold medal – first place	2002 Manchester	25m centre fire pistol
Gold medal – first place	2002 Manchester	25m centre fire pistol pairs
Gold medal – first place	2002 Manchester	25m standard pistol
Gold medal – first place	2002 Manchester	25m standard pistol pairs
Gold medal – first place	2006 Melbourne	25m centre fire pistol pairs
Silver medal – second place	1994 Victoria	10m air pistol
Silver medal – second place	1998 Kuala Lumpur	10m air pistol
Silver medal – second place	1998 Kuala Lumpur	10m air pistol pairs
Silver medal – second place	2002 Manchester	10m air pistol pairs
Bronze medal – third place	1994 Victoria	10m air pistol pairs
Bronze medal – third place	2002 Manchester	10m air pistol
Asian Championships
Gold medal – first place	1995 Jakarta	25 m standard pistol
Bronze medal – third place	2000 Langkawi	25 m center-fire pistol
World Junior Championships
Gold medal – first place	1994 Milan	25 m standard pistol

Jaspal Rana (28 June 1976 – 12 June 2026) was an Indian sport shooter and coach. Rana won numerous medals at international competitions, including the Asian Games and Commonwealth Games, and had been instrumental in shaping India's presence in shooting sports. He remains India's most successful athlete in Commonwealth Games history, with a remarkable tally of 15 medals—9 gold, 4 silver, and 2 bronze—won across four editions of the Games: 1994, 1998, 2002 and 2006. He was awarded the Arjuna Award in 1994 and the Padma Shri in 1997 for his contributions to Indian shooting. Beyond his competitive career, he was also known for mentoring young shooters and contributing to the growth of shooting in India, for which he was awarded the Dronacharya Award in 2020. Rana had been credited with helping Manu Bhaker win double bronze medals at the 2024 Paris Olympics.

== Early life ==
Jaspal Rana was born in 1976 in a Garhwali family in Uttarakhand. His father Narayan Singh Rana is a 1971 war veteran who served in Indo-Tibetan Border Police and later became the first sports minister of Uttarakhand in 2000. His father was also interested in Shooting sports and was Jaspal's first coach. Jaspal has two siblings, Sushma Singh (Rana) and Subhash Rana; both his siblings are also accomplished shooters. Japal Rana's mother Shyama Devi died on 28 June 2026, 16 days after his own death and what could have been his 50th birthday.

Jaspal studied at Kendriya Vidyayala in Delhi and then at St. Stephen's College, Delhi.

== Career ==
=== Sport Shooter Career ===
At the age of 12, Jaspal Rana made his first accomplishment at his national debut winning a silver at the 31st National Shooting Championship held at Ahmedabad in 1988. His astounding performance earned him huge accolades and appreciation at his very first win. He grabbed his first grand international glory at the 46th World Shooting Championship (Junior Section) with a world record score in Milan, Italy in the year 1994.

Rana represented India at the 1996 Atlanta Olympics, competing in two pistol events. He finished 29th in the men's 10m air pistol and 45th in the men's 50m free pistol events.

He won medals at several Commonwealth Games from 1994 to 2006. He won 15 medals, which included 9 gold medals, 4 silver medals, and 2 bronze medals. His most successful event was 2002 Commonwealth Games at Manchester, where he won six medals.

In the 2006 Asian Games in Doha, Rana achieved a major milestone, winning three gold medals and a silver as a 30-year-old shooter competing in his fourth Asian Games, wherein he equaled the world record in 25 m Center Fire Pistol with 590 points.

=== Coaching career ===
Around 2012, Rana started coaching young Indian sport shooters. Since 2018, pistol coach Jaspal Rana has been coaching Olympic medalist Manu Bhaker, though Bhaker and Rana briefly parted ways in 2021, but re-united in 2023 to prepare for the 2024 Olympics. Rana was supported by Indian Olympic Association president PT Usha and he developed a rigorous training schedule for Bhaker by replicating the routine of Olympic matches in their daily schedule.

Bhaker has credited coach Jaspal Rana with helping her win double bronze medals at the 2024 Paris Olympics. Though Bhaker credits Rana with the medals, he said he was just playing his role as a coach, giving his 100% to her training. Rana also coached at the Jaspal Rana Institute of Education and Technology in Dehradun. He further noted that coaching was his passion and his Dehradun coaching academy was never about making money.

== Political activities ==
Shortly after the 2006 Asian Games, Rana joined the Bharatiya Janata Party (BJP) and contested the 2009 Lok Sabha elections from the Tehri constituency, where he was defeated by Vijay Bahuguna of the Indian National Congress. In 2012, after being denied a BJP ticket for the Uttarakhand Legislative Assembly election, he joined the Congress party. Rana was announced as a star campaigner for the party in the 2012 elections and was subsequently assigned a minor role in the Harish Rawat-led government. He continued to campaign for the party during the 2017 elections.

== Advocacy and community work ==
In 2017, following the implementation of the Goods and Services Tax (GST), Rana became a prominent voice against the high tax rates placed on imported sports equipment, particularly for shooting. He argued that the tax, which was as high as 28% on some items, unfairly burdened athletes from middle-class backgrounds and threatened to hinder India's progress in international competitions. The idea behind this advocacy was credited to Farid Ali, a senior TV9 journalist and also a shooting champion. Farid and Jaspal jointly raised several issues that led to systemic changes and benefited the shooting sports community.

Rana was joined by others, including NRAI President Raninder Singh, Senior Vice President and MP Kalikesh Narayan Singh Deo, Olympic medallist shooters Abhinav Bindra and Gagan Narang. When the government provided a tax exemption on imported sporting goods due to their efforts, Rajyavardhan Singh Rathore specifically thanked Singh Deo for backing the exemption.

== Delhi State Rifle Association ==
Jaspal Rana was nominated Chairman of the Delhi State Rifle Association (DSRA) following the demise of Col. Jaswant Singh in 2013. In 2018, Rana, along with Rajiv Sharma, Farid Ali, Shakun Bhugra, and Jaspal Singh Marwah, took over the executive leadership of the association. Rana served as chairman, Sharma as Honorary Secretary, and Ali as Joint Secretary. Together with other team members, they modernised the administration of shooting in the region by restructuring tournament rules, improving funding pipelines, and enhancing equipment access for junior shooters.

Rana, Sharma, and Ali also served together on important DSRA sub-committees, including the Sub-Committee for Implementation of Anti-Doping Measures (focusing on education and testing protocols at regional events) and the State Shooting Championship & Training Camp Organising Sub-Committee. In August 2025, during the 40th Delhi State Shooting Championship at the Dr. Karni Singh Shooting Range, the trio competed in a special 25-metre pistol match for governing body members that Rana had proposed to foster camaraderie. Farid Ali won gold with 325 points, Rana took silver with 321 points, and Sharma earned bronze with 288 points. The event aimed to inspire younger shooters.

== Personal life and death ==
His family belongs to the Garhwal region of Uttarakhand and is involved in sports and state politics. His father Narayan Singh Rana is a war veteran who became the first sports minister of the Uttarakhand in 2000. He has two siblings Sushma Singh (Rana) and Subhash Rana. Sushma is wife of BJP leader Pankaj Singh and also the daughter-in-law of Rajnath Singh, an eminent BJP leader. Both his siblings are also accomplished shooters. Brother Subhash is an international shooter and Dronachary Awardee Para shooting team coach. He was first married to Reena Rana, an international shooter, model, and news anchor. Following their divorce, he married Aarushie Verma, later divorced after a short term marriage. He had two children from his first marriage: daughter Devanshi Rana a Junior World Champion in Air Pistol Mixed event in the year 2018, Khelo India Gold medalist in Sports Pistol event 2019 and son Yuvraj Singh Rana a national medalist in shotgun and pistol both.

Rana died in New Delhi on 12 June 2026, aged 49, due to a cardiac rupture while asleep.

== Major achievements ==
- Gold Medal in the 1994 Asian Games in Hiroshima
- Gold medal in Men's 25m Centre Fire Pistol (Pairs) with Samaresh Jung at the 2006 Commonwealth Games
- Gold Medals in 25m Standard Pistol and 25m Center Fire Pistol at the 2006 Asian Games on 7-8 Dec 2006
- While winning the 25 m Center Fire Pistol event, Rana equalled the world record by aggregating 590 points.*

== Awards and recognition ==
At just 18 years old, Rana was honored with the Arjuna Award in 1994, India's second-highest sporting accolade, acknowledging his early achievements in shooting.

By the age of 21, he was conferred the Padma Shri in 1997, India's fourth-highest civilian award, for his exceptional contributions to sports.

Recognized for his excellence in coaching, Rana received the Dronacharya Award in 2020, India's highest honor for sports coaching. Notably, he was awarded in the same year that his protégés, Manu Bhaker and Saurabh Chaudhary, received the Arjuna Award.

In 2025, he was awarded the Uttarakhand Gaurav Samman 2025, one of the two highest civilian awards of the State of Uttarakhand along with Late Actor & Writer Tom Alter, Late Statehood Activist Sushila Baluni, Chipko Movement Leader Late Gaura Devi, Warrior Teelu Rauteli, Entrepreneur & Social Worker Dev Raturi, and other notable personalities.

== Sources ==
- Rana equals world record at Asiad, wins gold.
- Exclusive Interview of Jaspal Rana after his 3 Gold haul in Doha, Qatar Games.
