= Shriyanka Sadangi =

Indian sport shooter

Personal information
- Nationality: Indian
- Born: Shriyanka Sadangi; 10 January 1995 (age 31) Sambalpur, Odisha, India
- Height: 1.72 m (5 ft 8 in)
- Weight: 60 kg (132 lb)

Sport
- Country: India
- Sport: Shooting
- Event(s): 50 m rifle 3-position, 50 m rifle prone and 10 m air rifle
Medal record
Women's shooting
Representing India
World Cup
Bronze medal – third place	2022 Cairo	50m Rifle 3P Individual
Asian Shooting Championships
Gold medal – first place	2023 Changwon	50 m rifle 3 positions team
Bronze medal – third place	2023 Changwon	10 m air rifle team
Asian Airgun Championships
Silver medal – second place	2012 Nanchang	10 m air rifle team
Silver medal – second place	2016 Tehran	10 m air rifle team
South Asian Games
Gold medal – first place	2019 Kathmandu	10m Air Rifle Women’s Individual
Silver medal – second place	2019 Kathmandu	50m Rifle Prone Team

Shriyanka Sadangi (born 10 January 1995) is an Indian shooter from Odisha. She has represented her state and India at national and international level.

== Early life ==
Sadangi was born in 1995 in Sambalpur to Col. Sitansu Charan Sadangi and Sudha Sadangi. Her father's Indian army service took her to many cities in India while growing up.

== Education ==
Sadangi finished her schooling at the Delhi Public School, Vasant Kunj. She trains and practices at the Gagan Narang Academy, Pune. She also received a scholarship from the Oil and Natural Gas Corporation Limited. She joined the MBA program at KIIT School of Management, KIIT deemed to be University in July 2018 and is currently studying there.

== Sports career ==
In 2010, Sadangi participated in the World Shooting Championship in Germany.

In October 2011 in the Asian Airgun Championship organised in Kuwait, Sadangi bagged a gold medal. In November of the same year, she won a silver and two bronze medals in individual events at the 55th National Shooting championship.

In January 2012, Sadangi bagged a silver medal in 10 meter Air Rifle Women category in the 12th Asian Championship held at Doha. She scored 394 out of 400 at the championship in Doha.That achievement made her the most successful shooter from the Indian state of Odisha.

Sadangi's first achievement in senior category the same year was a silver medal in the 5th Asian Senior Airgun Shooting Championship in Nanchang, China. This was a 10-metre Air Rifle event.

In 2014, Sadangi was selected in the Indian team for the 51st ISSF World Shooting Championship at Granada, Spain.

In 2015, Sadangi won a silver in Asian Shooting Championship in 10m Air Rifle Junior Women's event at Kuwait.

In 2016, she won a silver in 9th Asian Airgun Championship, 10 meter Air Rifle Shooting event in Tehran, Iran. This was the fifth position in the championship.

In 2018, Shriyanka lost the shootoff for gold in women's air rifle, after a close match with Charleen Baenisch of Germany in the International shooting championship.

== Awards ==
Sadangi has bagged 3 gold medals, 6 silver medals, and 3 bronze medals in various international events. This is in addition to many national medals.

In 2014, she was recognized with the Ekalabya Puraskar which is the most prestigious sports award of Odisha.
