= Chain Singh =

Indian sport shooter

Subedar Major Chain Singh OLY
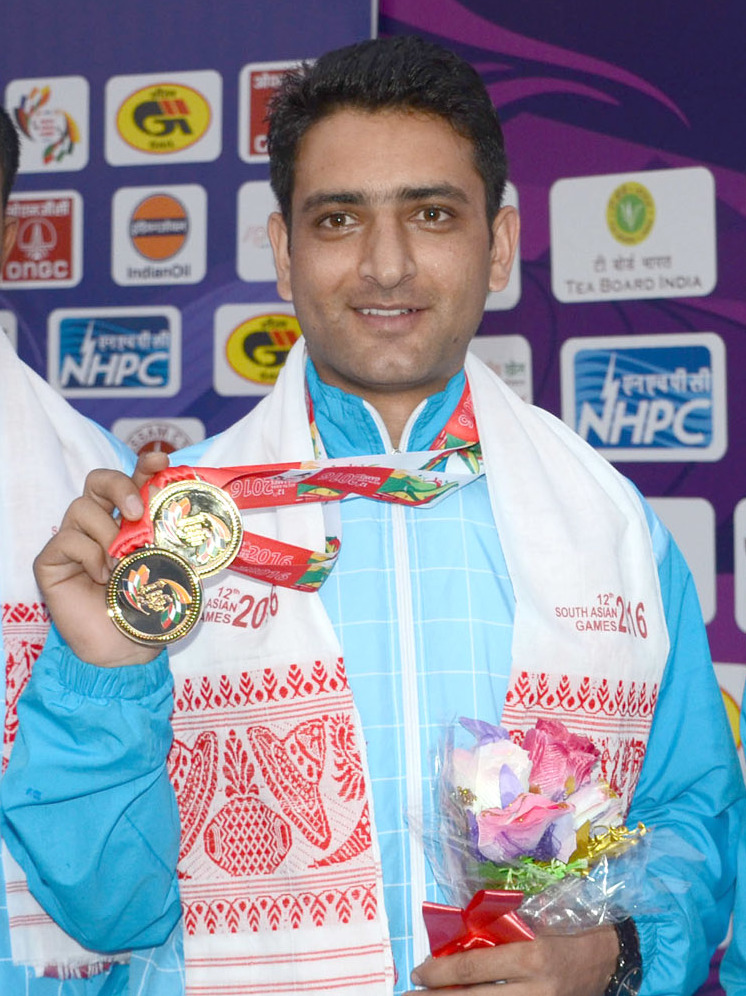
- Singh at the 2016 South Asian Games

Personal information
- Nationality: Indian
- Born: 5 April 1989 (age 37) Doda district, Jammu and Kashmir, India
- Height: 1.72 m (5 ft 8 in)
- Military career
- Allegiance: India
- Branch: Indian Army
- Rank: Subedar Major

Sport
- Sport: Shooting
- Events: 50 m rifle 3 positions 10 m air rifle

Achievements and titles
- Highest world ranking: 5 (1 September 2025)
Medal record
Men's shooting
Representing India
World Cup
| Gold medal – first place | 2021 New Delhi | 50 m air rifle 3 positions team |
| Silver medal – second place | 2022 Changwon | 50 m air rifle 3 positions team |
| Bronze medal – third place | 2025 Buenos Aires | 50 m air rifle 3 positions |
Asian Games
| Bronze medal – third place | 2014 Incheon | 50 m air rifle 3 positions |
Asian Championships
| Gold medal – first place | 2014 Kuwait City | 10 m air rifle |
| Silver medal – second place | 2025 Shymkent | 50 m air rifle 3 positions team |
| Bronze medal – third place | 2019 Doha | 50 m air rifle 3 positions team |
South Asian Games
| Gold medal – first place | 2016 Guwahati | 10 m air rifle |
| Gold medal – first place | 2016 Guwahati | 10 m air rifle team |
| Gold medal – first place | 2016 Guwahati | 50 m air rifle prone |
| Gold medal – first place | 2016 Guwahati | 50 m air rifle prone team |
| Gold medal – first place | 2016 Guwahati | 50 m air rifle 3 positions |
| Gold medal – first place | 2016 Guwahati | 50 m air rifle 3 positions team |
| Gold medal – first place | 2019 Kathmandu | 50 m air rifle 3 positions |
Junior Asian Championships
| Bronze medal – third place | 2009 Doha | 10 m air rifle |

Subedar Major Chain Singh (born 5 April 1989) is an Indian sport shooter and a Junior Commissioned Officer in the Indian Army, where he first learned and honed his skills in shooting in 2007. Specializing in rifle events, Singh has represented India at various prestigious international competitions, including the 2016 Rio Olympics.

== Career ==
=== 2014 Asian Games ===
Chain Singh was a bronze medalist in the 2014 Asian Games at Incheon in South Korea. He won a bronze medal in the men's 50m rifle three positions event, scoring 441.7 points to finish behind two Chinese shooters - Cao Yifei and Zhu Qinan - who scored 455.5 and 455.2 points respectively.

=== 2014 7th Asian Airgun championship ===
Singh won an individual gold medal in the 7th Asian Airgun Championship which was held in Kuwait from 7 March to 15 March. His final score was 206 points. followed by Qin Cong and Liu Zhiguo of China.

=== 2015 National Games ===
The National Games of India 2015 was held from 31 January to 14 February across seven districts of Kerala, India.[1] It was the second time that Kerala had hosted the national games. Singh won 3 individual medals (2 Gold and 1 Bronze) followed by 3 team gold medals in all 3 Rifle shooting events. He set a national record in the 50-metre 3-position event by earning 1181/1200 points, which was also his personal best. He participated in two events in the International Shooting Competition at Hannover, Germany during April 2015. In the FR Prone he won Gold and in Air Rifle Silver.

=== 2016 South Asian games ===
Singh bagged six gold medals in the 12th South Asian Games held at Guwahati in India in 2016. He won all his events and secured his spot for the Rio Olympics.

=== 2016 Rio Olympics ===
Singh has represented the country in Rio Olympic Games in rifle shooting (50 m 3-position event) which was held in Brazil, where he placed 23rd.

=== Indian National Shooting Championship ===
Singh won more than 65 medals in National Shooting Championships.

=== XXI Commonwealth Games Australia ===
Singh represented India at XXI Commonwealth Games in shooting sport, held at Gold Coast Australia from 4 April to 15 April 2018, where he placed 4th in 50 m rifle prone men event and 5th in 50 m rifle 3 position event.

=== ISSF World Cup, Munich ===
Chain Singh won silver medal at ISSF world cup (Grand Prix) Munich in Germany 2018 with a score of 627.9 points in the 50-meter rifle prone event.

=== 13th SOUTH ASIAN GAMES KATHMANDU 2019 ===
13th South Asian games were held in Kathmandu 2019. Chain Singh of INDIA secured the 1st place in 50m rifle 3 position event by scoring 1179/1200.

=== ISSF WORLD CUP NEW DELHI 2021 ===
Mr Singh won Gold in 50m rifle 3position team event with the score in Qualification round1 1320 points. followed by Q2. scored 875 points.

=== ISSF WORLD CUP CHANGWON SOUTH KOREA 2022 ===
Chain Singh also won Team Silver in 50m Rifle 3position event by scoring Q1. 1313 points followed by Q2. 878 points.

=== ISSF WORLD CUP BUENOS AIRES ARGENTINA 2025 ===
Chain singh also won Individual BRONZE in 50m rifle 3position event with the score of 589 in Qualification round followed by 443.7 points in finals.

=== 15th Asian shooting championship Kazakhstan 2025 ===
Mr Singh also got team silver in Asian shooting championship Kazakhstan 2025 in 50m rifle 3position team.
