= Shooting at the 2010 Commonwealth Games – Men's 10 metre air pistol pairs =

The Men's 10 metre air pistol pairs event took place at 7 October 2010 at the CRPF Campus.

== Results ==
Rank	Name	Country	1	2	3	4	5	6	Ind. Total	Total
1st place, gold medalist(s)	Omkar Singh	India	98	98	98	98	98	97	587^{23}	1163^{42} (GR)
1st place, gold medalist(s)	Gurpreet Singh	India	95	96	97	94	96	98	576^{19}	1163^{42} (GR)
2nd place, silver medalist(s)	Nick Baxter	England	96	97	96	95	95	94	573^{19}	1143^{30}
2nd place, silver medalist(s)	Mick Gault	England	94	93	94	96	98	95	571^{11}	1143^{30}
3rd place, bronze medalist(s)	Gai Bin	Singapore	97	96	97	95	93	93	571^{18}	1139^{29}
3rd place, bronze medalist(s)	Lim Swee Hon Nigel	Singapore	94	98	94	98	93	91	568^{11}	1139^{29}
4	Daniel Repacholi	Australia	98	95	96	96	96	95	576^{15}	1137^{26}
4	Christopher Roberts	Australia	94	92	91	95	94	95	561^{11}	1137^{26}
5	Robert Doak	Northern Ireland	93	95	90	94	97	96	565^{13}	1125^{27}
5	Hugh Stewart	Northern Ireland	91	91	95	93	97	93	560^{14}	1125^{27}
6	Roger Daniel	Trinidad and Tobago	93	96	98	91	95	95	568^{16}	1121^{23}
6	Rhodney Allen	Trinidad and Tobago	91	91	94	89	94	94	553^{7}	1121^{23}
7	Alais Sulong	Malaysia	93	92	95	94	90	95	559^{13}	1118^{24}
7	Hasli Amir Hasan	Malaysia	94	93	88	92	95	97	559^{11}	1118^{24}
8	Calvert Herbert	Barbados	91	96	90	96	95	92	560^{13}	1112^{26}
8	Bernard Chase	Barbados	92	92	95	93	91	89	552^{13}	1112^{26}
9	Sylvain Ouellette	Canada	94	94	96	91	93	97	565^{13}	1111^{26}
9	Alan Markewicz	Canada	91	89	92	88	96	90	546^{13}	1111^{26}
10	Kalim Khan	Pakistan	96	96	92	90	94	93	561^{11}	1111^{18}
10	Irshad Ali	Pakistan	95	92	93	87	87	96	550^{7}	1111^{18}
11	Shamindepal Madhar	Kenya	89	91	91	95	89	90	545^{8}	1082^{11}
11	Shitul Shah	Kenya	89	86	86	91	94	91	537^{3}	1082^{11}
12	Stephen Ryan	Norfolk Island	87	84	91	87	88	85	522^{4}	1043^{7}
12	Graham Lock	Norfolk Island	83	85	87	91	89	86	521^{3}	1043^{7}
13	Nevin Middleton	Falkland Islands	80	80	83	84	90	76	493^{4}	960^{6}
13	Murray Middleton	Falkland Islands	74	70	78	78	83	84	467^{2}	960^{6}
