= 2007 Asian Shooting Championships =

International sport shooting competition

- Host city: Kuwait City, Kuwait
- Dates: 3–13 December 2007
- Main venue: Sheikh Sabah Al-Ahmad Olympic Shooting Complex

The 2007 Asian Shooting Championships were held in Kuwait City, Kuwait between December 3 and December 13, 2007. It acts as the Asian qualifying tournament for the 2008 Summer Olympics in Beijing.

== Medal summary ==
=== Men ===
| Event | Gold | Silver | Bronze |
|---|---|---|---|
| 10 m air pistol | Tan Zongliang; China | Shi Xinglong; China | Kim Jong-su; North Korea |
| 10 m air pistol team | China; Pang Wei; Shi Xinglong; Tan Zongliang | Japan; Susumu Kobayashi; Masaru Nakashige; Shoichi Uenosono | Kazakhstan; Vladimir Issachenko; Vyacheslav Podlesniy; Rashid Yunusmetov |
| 25 m center fire pistol | Kim Hyon-ung; North Korea | Vijay Kumar; India | Kim Jong-su; North Korea |
| 25 m center fire pistol team | North Korea; Kim Hyon-ung; Kim Jong-su; Ryu Myong-yon | India; Samaresh Jung; Vijay Kumar; Pushpender Singh | Japan; Teruyoshi Akiyama; Tomohiro Kida; Susumu Kobayashi |
| 25 m rapid fire pistol | Zhang Penghui; China | Hasli Izwan; Malaysia | Cha Sang-jun; South Korea |
| 25 m rapid fire pistol team | China; Liu Zhongsheng; Yang Dongming; Zhang Penghui | South Korea; Cha Sang-jun; Hwang Yoon-sam; Kang Hyung-chul | Japan; Teruyoshi Akiyama; Tomohiro Kida; Shuji Tazawa |
| 25 m standard pistol | Liu Zhongsheng; China | Kim Jong-su; North Korea | Kim Hyon-ung; North Korea |
| 25 m standard pistol team | North Korea; Kim Hyon-ung; Kim Jong-su; Ryu Myong-yon | China; Liu Zhongsheng; Yang Dongming; Zhang Penghui | Japan; Teruyoshi Akiyama; Tomohiro Kida; Shuji Tazawa |
| 50 m pistol | Xu Kun; China | Jin Jong-oh; South Korea | Jakkrit Panichpatikum; Thailand |
| 50 m pistol team | China; Lin Zhongzai; Tan Zongliang; Xu Kun | South Korea; Ha Gil-yong; Jin Jong-oh; Lee Dae-myung | Kazakhstan; Vladimir Issachenko; Vyacheslav Podlesniy; Rashid Yunusmetov |
| 10 m air rifle | P. T. Raghunath; India | Liu Tianyou; China | Cao Yifei; China |
| 10 m air rifle team | India; Abhinav Bindra; Gagan Narang; P. T. Raghunath | China; Cao Yifei; Liu Tianyou; Zhu Qinan | Japan; Tadashi Maki; Takayuki Matsumoto; Toshikazu Yamashita |
| 50 m rifle prone | Jia Zhanbo; China | Gagan Narang; India | Park Bong-duk; South Korea |
| 50 m rifle prone team | China; Jia Zhanbo; Liu Gang; Qiu Jian | India; Gagan Narang; Sanjeev Rajput; Surendra Singh Rathod | Japan; Tadashi Maki; Midori Yajima; Toshikazu Yamashita |
| 50 m rifle 3 positions | Jia Zhanbo; China | Sanjeev Rajput; India | Zhang Lei; China |
| 50 m rifle 3 positions team | China; Jia Zhanbo; Qiu Jian; Zhang Lei | South Korea; Bae Sung-duk; Han Jin-seop; Park Bong-duk | India; Imran Hassan Khan; Gagan Narang; Sanjeev Rajput |
| Trap | Lee Young-sik; South Korea | Naser Al-Meqlad; Kuwait | Lee Wung Yew; Singapore |
| Trap team | South Korea; Joo Ip-sang; Jung Chang-hee; Lee Young-sik | Kuwait; Abdulrahman Al-Faihan; Naser Al-Meqlad; Khaled Al-Mudhaf | Japan; Atsushi Otake; Hiroshi Susuki; Shingo Tada |
| Double trap | Pan Qiang; China | Saif Al-Shamsi; United Arab Emirates | Wang Zheng; China |
| Double trap team | China; Pan Qiang; Wang Nan; Wang Zheng | Chinese Taipei; Chang Chien Ming-shan; Chen Shih-wei; Shih Wei-tin | Kuwait; Hamad Al-Afasi; Rashed Al-Manee; Mashfi Al-Mutairi |
| Skeet | Abdullah Al-Rashidi; Kuwait | Qu Ridong; China | Saeed Al-Maktoum; United Arab Emirates |
| Skeet team | Kuwait; Zaid Al-Mutairi; Abdullah Al-Rashidi; Saud Habib | Qatar; Masoud Saleh Al-Athba; Abdulaziz Al-Attiyah; Nasser Al-Attiyah | Kazakhstan; Sergey Kolos; Vladislav Mukhamediyev; Sergey Yakshin |

=== Women ===
| Event | Gold | Silver | Bronze |
|---|---|---|---|
| 10 m air pistol | Guo Wenjun; China | Lee Ho-lim; South Korea | Huang Yi-ling; Chinese Taipei |
| 10 m air pistol team | China; Guo Wenjun; Hu Jun; Ren Jie | South Korea; Kim Byung-hee; Kim Yun-mi; Lee Ho-lim | North Korea; Jo Yong-suk; Kang Un-byol; Ri Hyang-sun |
| 25 m pistol | Chen Ying; China | Tsogbadrakhyn Mönkhzul; Mongolia | Fei Fengji; China |
| 25 m pistol team | China; Chen Ying; Fei Fengji; Guo Wenjun | Mongolia; Otryadyn Gündegmaa; Tsogbadrakhyn Mönkhzul; Davaajantsangiin Oyuun | South Korea; Gang Eun-ra; Kim Byung-hee; Kim Yun-mi |
| 10 m air rifle | Du Li; China | Kim Chan-mi; South Korea | Zhao Yinghui; China |
| 10 m air rifle team | China; Du Li; Wu Liuxi; Zhao Yinghui | South Korea; Jung Eun-hea; Kang Seon-ah; Kim Chan-mi | India; Priya Agarwal; Suma Shirur; Avneet Sidhu |
| 50 m rifle prone | Olga Dovgun; Kazakhstan | Seiko Iwata; Japan | Yin Wen; China |
| 50 m rifle prone team | China; Du Li; Wu Liuxi; Yin Wen | Kazakhstan; Olga Dovgun; Galina Korchma; Alexandra Malinovskaya | Malaysia; Nor Ain Ibrahim; Shahera Rahim Raja; Nur Suryani Taibi |
| 50 m rifle 3 positions | Elena Kuznetsova; Uzbekistan | Du Li; China | Olga Dovgun; Kazakhstan |
| 50 m rifle 3 positions team | China; Du Li; Wu Liuxi; Yin Wen | Kazakhstan; Olga Dovgun; Galina Korchma; Alexandra Malinovskaya | Mongolia; Zorigtyn Batkhuyag; Damdinsürengiin Lkhamsüren; Chuluunbadrakhyn Narantuyaa |
| Trap | Yelena Struchayeva; Kazakhstan | Lin Yi-chun; Chinese Taipei | Pak Yong-hui; North Korea |
| Trap team | China; Chen Li; Gao E Liu Yingzi | North Korea; Chae Hye-gyong; Kim Yong-bok; Pak Yong-hui | Kazakhstan; Anastassiya Davydova; Mariya Dmitriyenko; Yelena Struchayeva |
| Skeet | Pak Jong-ran; North Korea | Sutiya Jiewchaloemmit; Thailand | Ri Hyon-ok; North Korea |
| Skeet team | North Korea; Kim Myong-hwa; Pak Jong-ran; Ri Hyon-ok | China; Wei Ning; Yu Xiumin; Zhang Shan | South Korea; Cho A-ra; Kim Min-ji; Son Hye-kyoung |

== Medal table ==
| Rank | Nation | Gold | Silver | Bronze | Total |
|---|---|---|---|---|---|
| 1 | China | 22 | 7 | 6 | 35 |
| 2 | North Korea | 5 | 2 | 6 | 13 |
| 3 | South Korea | 2 | 8 | 4 | 14 |
| 4 | India | 2 | 5 | 2 | 9 |
| 5 | Kazakhstan | 2 | 2 | 5 | 9 |
| 6 | Kuwait | 2 | 2 | 1 | 5 |
| 7 | Uzbekistan | 1 | 0 | 0 | 1 |
| 8 | Japan | 0 | 2 | 6 | 8 |
| 9 | Chinese Taipei | 0 | 2 | 1 | 3 |
| 9 | Mongolia | 0 | 2 | 1 | 3 |
| 11 | Malaysia | 0 | 1 | 1 | 2 |
| 11 | Thailand | 0 | 1 | 1 | 2 |
| 11 | United Arab Emirates | 0 | 1 | 1 | 2 |
| 14 | Qatar | 0 | 1 | 0 | 1 |
| 15 | Singapore | 0 | 0 | 1 | 1 |
| Totals (15 entries) | | 36 | 36 | 36 | 108 |
