= Elizabeth Koshy =

Indian sport shooter (born 1994)

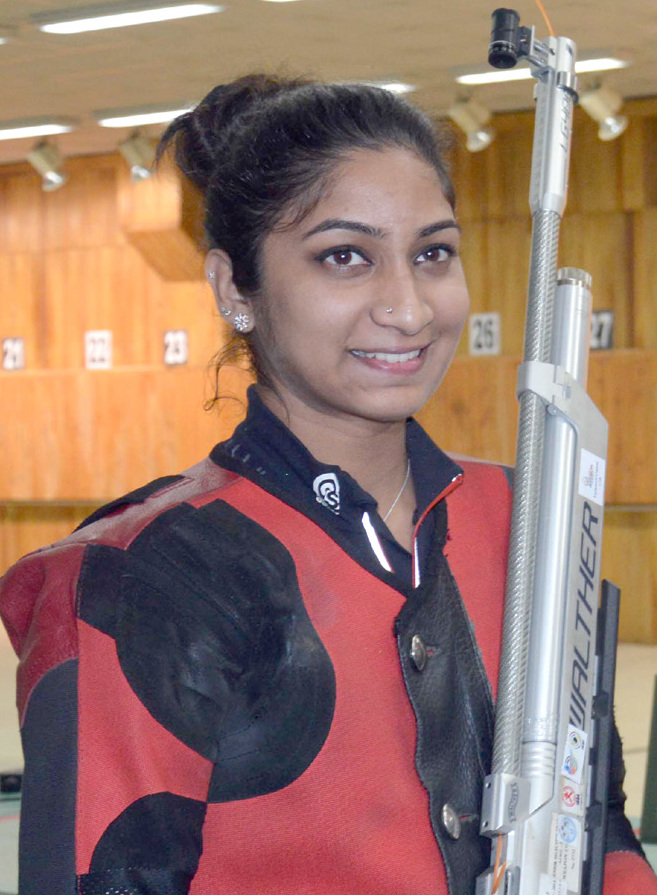
- Elizabeth Koshy at the 12th South Asian Games in 2016

Personal information
- Full name: Elizabeth Susan Koshy
- Nationality: Indian
- Born: 10 May 1994 (age 32) Kochi, Kerala, India
- Height: 1.61 m (5 ft 3 in)
- Weight: 54 kg (119 lb)

Sport
- Country: India
- Sport: Shooting
Medal record
Women's shooting
Representing India
Asian Championships
Bronze medal – third place	2015 Kuwait City	50 m rifle 3 positions team
South Asian Games
Silver medal – second place	2016 Guwahati	10 m air rifle
Gold medal – first place	2016 Guwahati	10 m air rifle team

Elizabeth Susan Koshy (born May 10, 1994) is an Indian shooter from Kerala.

== Career ==
Koshy made her international debut at the Junior meet in Germany in 2011 in which the Indian team was in sixth place. Koshy won five gold medals in Thiruvananthapuram at the State championship in the same year. She won silver in the Asian Shooting Championships and represented India in the 2013 and 2014 World Cups. Koshy took part in the 2014 Glasgow Commonwealth Games. Koshy won gold in the 2015 National Games women's 50m Rifle Prone event, the first for Kerala. She was coached by Haryana-based Satguru Dass from the navy. From Kochi, she was inspired to take up the sport on seeing a pre-National shooting championship during her childhood; she said that her grandfather was a hunter. She has taken part in prone, three-position and air rifle events but prefers three-position.
