= Shweta Chaudhary =

Indian sport shooter (born 1986)

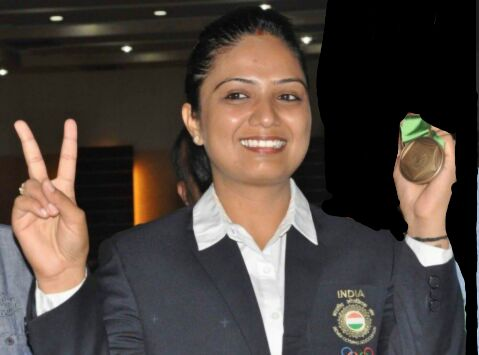
- Chaudhary at the 2014 Asian Games

Personal information
- Full name: Shweta Singh
- Born: Shweta Chaudhary; 3 July 1986 (age 39) Faridabad, Haryana, India
- Home town: Mathura, Faridabad, India
- Education: Faridabad Model school; Dayanand Anglo-Vedic Public School; Lady Shri Ram College for Women
- Years active: 1998–present
- Height: 170 cm (5 ft 7 in)
- Weight: 65 kg (143 lb)
- Spouse: Prashant Singh (m. 2013)

Sport
- Country: India
- Sport: Shooting
- Rank: 6 (1 April 2010)
- Events: 10 metre air pistol; 25 metre pistol
- Coached by: Lim Jang Soo; Ramesh Chaudhary; Prashant Singh
Medal record
Representing India
Shooting
Asian Shooting Championships
Gold medal – first place	2012 Doha	Women’s 10m Air Pistol(Team)
Bronze medal – third place	2004 KualaLumpur	Women’s 10m Air Pistol(Team)
Asian Games
Silver medal – second place	2006 Doha	10m Air Pistol
Bronze medal – third place	2014 Incheon	10m Air Pistol
Asian Air Gun Championships
Gold medal – first place	2005 Bangkok	10m Air Pistol
Gold medal – first place	2005 Bangkok	10m Air Pistol(Team)
Gold medal – first place	2015 Delhi	10m Air Pistol(Team)
Silver medal – second place	2011 Kuwait	10m Air Pistol(Team)
Silver medal – second place	2014 Kuwait	10m Air Pistol(Team)
Silver medal – second place	2015 Delhi	10m Air Pistol
Bronze medal – third place	2009 Doha	10m Air Pistol(Team)
Bronze medal – third place	2012 Nanjing	10m Air Pistol(Team)
Bronze medal – third place	2013 Tehran	10m Air Pistol(Team)
Commonwealth Games
Silver medal – second place	2002 Manchester	10m Air Pistol(Team)
Commonwealth Shooting Championships
Gold medal – first place	2005 Melbourne	10m Air Pistol(Badge)
Gold medal – first place	2010 Delhi	10m Air Pistol
Gold medal – first place	2010 Delhi	10m Air Pistol(Team)
Gold medal – first place	2010 Delhi	10m Air Pistol(Badge)
Silver medal – second place	2005 Melbourne	10m Air Pistol(Team)
Silver medal – second place	2005 Melbourne	Sports Pistol(Team)
Bronze medal – third place	2001 Bisley	10m Air Pistol(Team)
South Asian Games
Gold medal – first place	2008 Islamabad	10m Air Pistol
Gold medal – first place	2008 Islamabad	10m Air Pistol(Team)
Gold medal – first place	2008 Islamabad	Sport Pistol(Team)
Gold medal – first place	2016 Guwahati	10m Air Pistol
Gold medal – first place	2016 Guwahati	10m Air Pistol(Team)
South Asian Shooting Championship
Gold medal – first place	2008 Islamabad	Sport pistol
Gold medal – first place	2008 Islamabad	Sport pistol(Team)
Gold medal – first place	2009 Dhaka	10m Air Pistol(Team)
Gold medal – first place	2009 Dhaka	Sport Pistol(Team)
Bronze medal – third place	2009 Dhaka	Sport Pistol
World University Games
Bronze medal – third place	2007 Bangkok	10m Air Pistol
Hungarian Open
Silver medal – second place	2007 Hungary	10m Air Pistol
Silver medal – second place	2009 Hungary	10m Air Pistol
Silver medal – second place	2009 Hungary	10m Air Pistol
Bronze medal – third place	2008 Hungary	10m Air Pistol
Munich Open
Silver medal – second place	2006 Munich	10m Air Pistol
Grand prix
Silver medal – second place	2012 Tehran	10m Air Pistol
Meeting of the Shooting Hopes
Silver medal – second place	2005 Czech Republic	Sport Pistol
Bronze medal – third place	2000 Czech Republic	Sport Pistol(Team)
Bronze medal – third place	2004 Czech Republic	Air Pistol(Team)
Bronze medal – third place	2005 Czech Republic	Sport Pistol(Team)
ISSF Junior Cup
Gold medal – first place	2002 Suhl	10m Air Pistol(Team)
Silver medal – second place	2004 Suhl	10m Air Pistol
Silver medal – second place	2004 Suhl	10m Air Pistol(Team)

Shweta Chaudhry (born 3 July 1986), also known as Shweta Singh, is an Indian sport shooter who competes in the 10 metre air pistol and 25 metre sports pistol events.

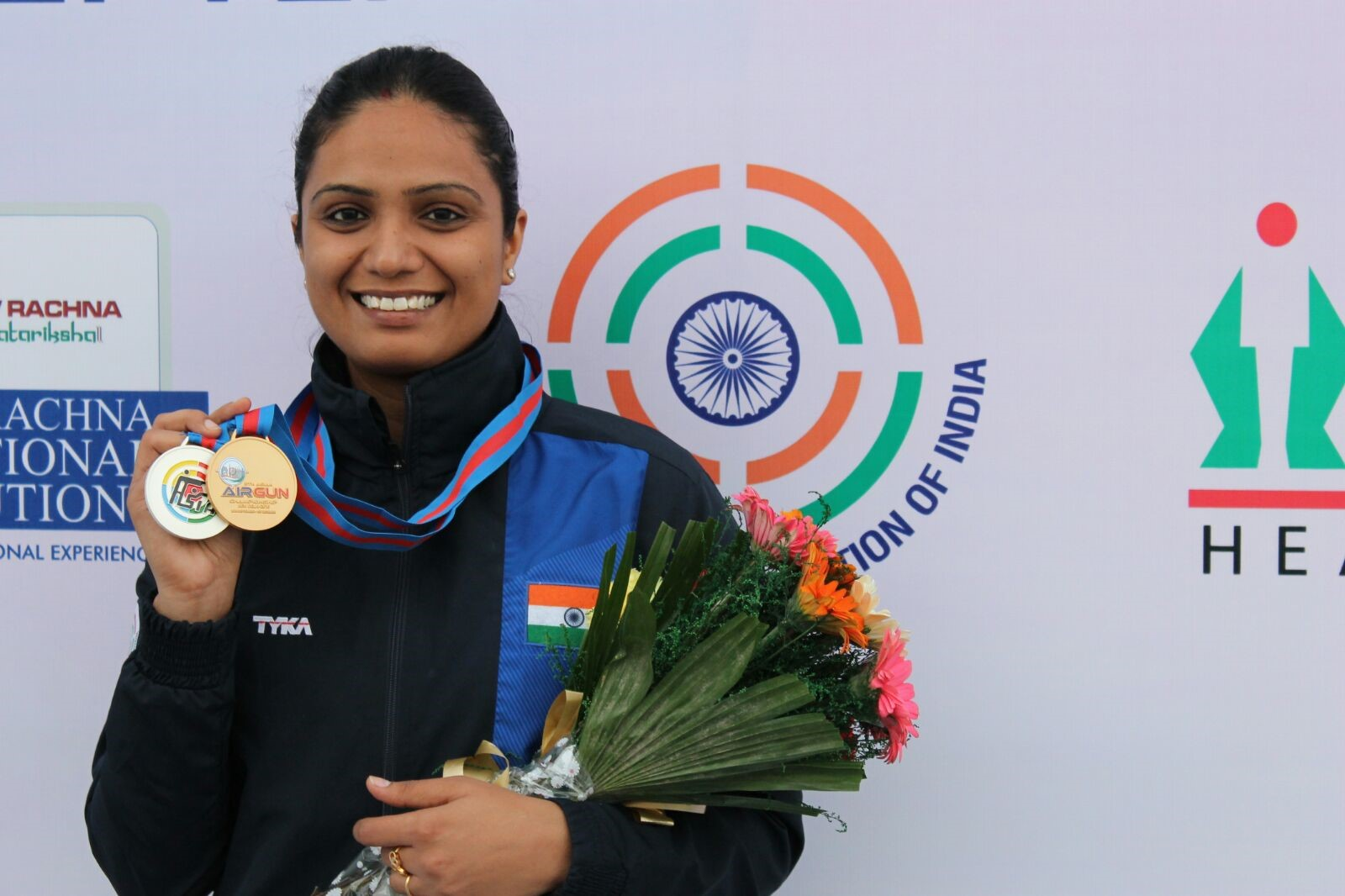
Chaudhary winning gold and silver medals at the 8th Asian Airgun Championship 2015

In 2014, at the 2014 Asian Games in Incheon, Chaudhary won the bronze medal in the women's air pistol event, having scored 176.4 points in the final, which was the first medal won by India in the games.

In 2009, at 2009 Asian Air Gun Championships in Doha, Chaudhary won a bronze medal in air pistol event having 381 points in the final.

== Career ==
Chaudhary has been a practicing shooter since 1997 when she was in 5th standard. Within a year, she made it to the senior national team. In 2000, at the age of 14, she became the senior national champion with a record breaking results. She played for Haryana state until she was supported by ONGC in 2006. Chaudhary, along with Sheila Kanungo, won a silver medal at the 2002 Commonwealth Games held in Manchester.

Chaudhary's other notable achievements include winning a silver medal (team) at the 15th Asian Games in 2006. She also won an individual bronze medal at the Asian Games held at Incheon in 2014. She won an individual silver medal at the 8th Asian Airgun Shooting Championship in New Delhi, India in September 2015.

Chaudhary is six-time national champion in air pistol and has accumulated about 117 national and 43 international medals, including 3 gold medals at the SAF Games 2004 in Pakistan, 3 gold medals at the 8th Commonwealth Shooting championship at New Delhi in 2010, where she won an individual gold medal, an individual badge medal, and a and pair event with Pushpanjali Rana. She won 2 gold medals (individual and team) at the 12th SAF Games 2016 in Guwahati, India. She has been supported by Olympic Gold Quest.

== Award ==
In 2004, the government of Haryana accredited Chaudhary with the Bhim Award for excellence in pistol shooting.
