= Eita Mori =

Japanese sports shooter

Personal information
- Born: 13 April 1983 (age 43)

Sport
- Sport: Sports shooting

Eita Mori (森 栄太, Mori Eita; born 13 April 1983) is a Japanese sports shooter. He competed in the men's 25 metre rapid fire pistol event at the 2016 Summer Olympics.
