= Yu Dan (sport shooter) =

Chinese sport shooter

Personal information
- Native name: 喻丹
- Nationality: China
- Born: August 18, 1987 (age 38) Neijiang, Sichuan, China
- Height: 1.58 m (5 ft 2 in)
- Weight: 50 kg (110 lb)

Sport
- Sport: Shooting
Medal record
Olympic Games
Bronze medal – third place	2012 London	10m air rifle

Yu Dan (Chinese: 喻丹; pinyin: Yù Dān; born August 18, 1987, in Sichuan, China) is a female Chinese sport shooter.

Yu won the bronze medal in the 10m air rifle at the 2012 Summer Olympics.

== See also ==
- China at the 2012 Summer Olympics
