= Kim Yun-mi (sport shooter) =

South Korean sport shooter

Medal record

Women's shooting

Representing South Korea

Asian Championships
Silver medal – second place	2007 Kuwait City	10 m air pistol team
Silver medal – second place	2012 Doha	25 m pistol team
Bronze medal – third place	2007 Kuwait City	25 m pistol team

Kim Yun-mi (Korean: 김윤미, born April 23, 1982) is a South Korean shooter. She is a member of the national shooting team. She won the gold medal in both the individual and the team competition of 10m air pistol at the 2010 Asian Games in Guangzhou. Her win of a gold medal this time was particularly notable as she was seven months pregnant at the time.

== Awards ==
- 2010 The 16th Guangzhou Asian Games Women's 10m Air Pistol gold medal
- 2010 The 16th Guangzhou Asian Games Women's 10m Air pistol Team gold medal
- 2008 The 1st Hanhwa national shooting championship Women's 10m air pistol winner
- 2008 Bonghwanggi national women's 25m pistol gold medal
- 2007 Asian Championship 10m air pistol team 3rd place
- 2007 Asian Championship 10m air pistol team 2nd place

== Career ==
- 2010 a member of the national shooting team for 16th Guangzhou Asian Games Women's shooting
- 2008 a member of the national shooting team for 29th Beijing Olympic Women's shooting
