= Pooja Ghatkar =

Indian sport shooter

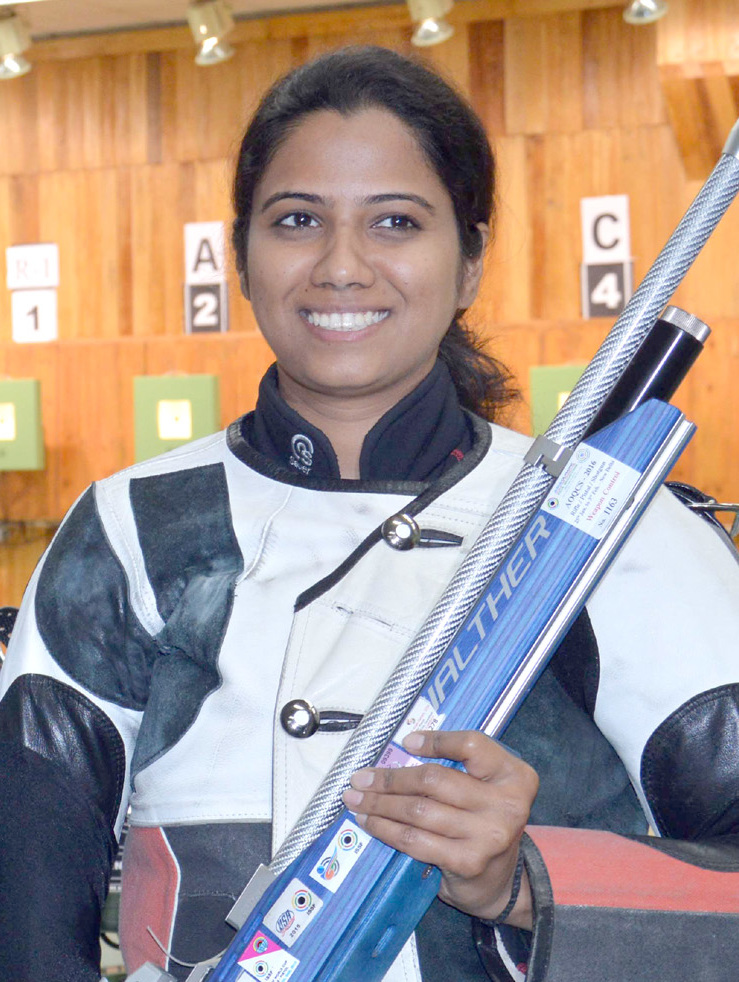
- Pooja Ghatkar at the 12th South Asian Games in 2016

Personal information
- Nationality: Indian
- Born: 1989 (age 36–37) Pune, Maharashtra, India
- Height: 165 cm (5 ft 5 in)
- Weight: 64 kg (141 lb)

Sport
- Country: India
- Sport: Shooting
Medal record
Women's shooting
Representing India
Commonwealth Championships
Gold medal – first place	2017 Brisbane	10 m air rifle
Bronze medal – third place	2017 Delhi	10 m air rifle

Pooja Ghatkar (born 1989) is an Indian professional sports shooter. She competes in the women's 10 meter air rifle event.

== Career ==
Ghatkar competed in the senior National Championships in 2013 in Delhi in the 10 meter air rifle event and won a gold medal. She won gold the following year at the Asian Championships in 2014 in Kuwait City. She scored 413.1 in the qualification round and 208.8 in the final to beat China's Du Bej's 207.2.

Competing at the Asian Olympic Qualifying Tournament in New Delhi to qualify for the 2016 Rio Olympics, a hit of 8.8 in the final cost her the spot after she lost it to fellow Indian Ayonika Paul, and won the bronze. Her first major international win came in 2017 when she won bronze at the 2017 New Delhi World Cup. She entered the final placed second having scored 418.0 in the qualification rounds. In the final, she managed 228.8. after falling behind China's Dong Lijie midway.
