= Mick Gault =

English sport shooter (born 1954)

Mick Gault OBE
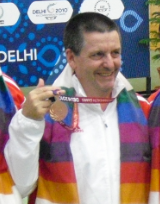
- Mick Gault with his bronze medal from the 2010 Commonwealth Games

Personal information
- Full name: Michael Gault
- Nickname: Mick
- National team: Great Britain; England
- Born: 2 May 1954 (age 72) Sheffield, England

Sport
- Country: England
- Sport: Shooting
- Event: Pistol
Medal record
Men's shooting
Representing United Kingdom
ISSF World Cup
Bronze medal – third place	1991 Zagreb	50m Pistol
Bronze medal – third place	1994 Fort Benning	10m Air Pistol
Representing England
Commonwealth Games
Gold medal – first place	1994 Victoria	50 m free pistol
Gold medal – first place	1998 Kuala Lumpur	50 m free pistol
Gold medal – first place	1998 Kuala Lumpur	50 m free pistol pairs
Gold medal – first place	1998 Kuala Lumpur	10 m air pistol
Gold medal – first place	1998 Kuala Lumpur	10 m air pistol pairs
Gold medal – first place	2002 Manchester	50 m free pistol
Gold medal – first place	2002 Manchester	10 m air pistol
Gold medal – first place	2002 Manchester	10 m air pistol pairs
Gold medal – first place	2006 Melbourne	25 m standard pistol
Silver medal – second place	1994 Victoria	25 m centre-fire pistol
Silver medal – second place	2006 Melbourne	50 m free pistol
Silver medal – second place	2006 Melbourne	10 m air pistol pairs
Silver medal – second place	2010 Delhi	10 m air pistol pairs
Bronze medal – third place	1994 Victoria	50 m free pistol pairs
Bronze medal – third place	2002 Manchester	25 m standard pistol
Bronze medal – third place	2006 Melbourne	50 m free pistol pairs
Bronze medal – third place	2010 Delhi	25 m air pistol pairs
Bronze medal – third place	2014 Glasgow	10 m air pistol

Michael Gault OBE (born 2 May 1954), is an English sport shooter. He has competed at the Commonwealth Games on six occasions winning eighteen medals, a record for athletes in any sport that he jointly holds with Australian shooter Phillip Adams, but has never been selected for the British Olympic team. Gault also won two ISSF World Cup bronze medals whilst representing Great Britain.

== Personal life ==
Gault was born in Sheffield and raised in Carlisle, Cumbria. He moved to Norfolk to work for the Royal Air Force as a radar engineer at RAF Marham. He is married to Janet and has two daughters and one son with five grandchildren.

== Career ==
In May 1994, Gault set two British records at the National Pistol Association meeting at Bisley. In the free pistol event he scored 570 ex600, surpassing Paul Leatherdale's record of 572. He also raised David Levene's record for centre-fire precision pistol by four points with a score of 296 ex300.

Gault first competed at the Commonwealth Games during the 1994 event held in Victoria, Canada, representing England. He won three medals; gold in the men's free pistol with a score of 654.1; silver in the men's centre fire pistol, with a score of 581; and bronze in the men's pairs free pistol, where he and partner Paul Leatherdale scored a combined 1082.

At the 1998 Commonwealth Games held in Kuala Lumpur, Malaysia, Gault won four gold medals. He won the individual men's 50 metre free pistol and 10 metre air pistol events and partnered Nick Baxter to win the pairs competitions in the same two events. He is one of only four English athletes to have won four gold medals at a single Commonwealth Games.

In 2002 Gault competed at the Manchester Games in his home country. He won three gold medals, successfully defending his titles in the individual 50 metre free pistol, individual 10 metre air pistol and pairs 10 metre air pistol with Nick Baxter, as well as a bronze medal in the men's individual 25 metre standard pistol.

Gault competed in his fourth Commonwealth Games in 2006 in Melbourne, Victoria, Australia. He won four medals, gold in the individual 25 metre standard pistol, silvers in the 50 metre free pistol and individual 10 metre air pistol and a bronze in the pairs 50 metre free pistol with Nick Baxter. His third medal of the Games took him to a total of 14 Commonwealth Games medals, surpassing the record of 13 by an English athlete that had been set by swimmer Karen Pickering. Following his achievement Gault carried the England flag during the closing ceremony. He was appointed OBE in the 2008 New Year Honours.

At the 2010 Commonwealth Games in Delhi, India, Gault won a further two medals taking his total in Commonwealth Games to 17. Competing with Nick Baxter he won silver in the 10 metre air pistol pairs and won bronze in the 25 metre standard pistol pairs alongside Iqbal Ubhi. Gault finished seventh in the 25 metre standard pistol singles, missing out on a medal by eight points, and leaving him one medal short of the Commonwealth Games record held by Australian shooter Phillip Adams.

After the 2010 Games he announced his retirement from the sport, citing the media pressure surrounding his medal record attempt, but reversed his decision with the aim of competing at his first Olympics at the 2012 Games in London. Gault achieved the qualifying mark for the free pistol event at the Olympics but was told by British Shooting that the only quota place available to Great Britain as the host nation was for the air pistol, an event in which he had not achieved the required qualification score. Under Olympic rules Gault would have been able to compete in both events if selected for the British team but despite former minister for Sport Kate Hoey petitioning on his behalf he was not selected.

Gault returned to the England team for the 2014 Commonwealth Games held in Glasgow, Scotland. He led the 10 metre air pistol event after 13 shots but eventually finished third with a score of 176.5. The bronze medal tied him with Adams record of 18. however Gault holds 9 Golds to Adams holding 7 Gold. Competing in the 50 metre pistol event he had an opportunity to break the medal record but finished 13th in the qualification round and missed out on the final. After being eliminated from the event he announced his retirement for the second time. On 25 December 2014 Gault suffered a minor stroke and has never shot since.
