= Omkar Singh =

Indian sport shooter (born 1984)

Master Chief Petty Officer Omkar Singh
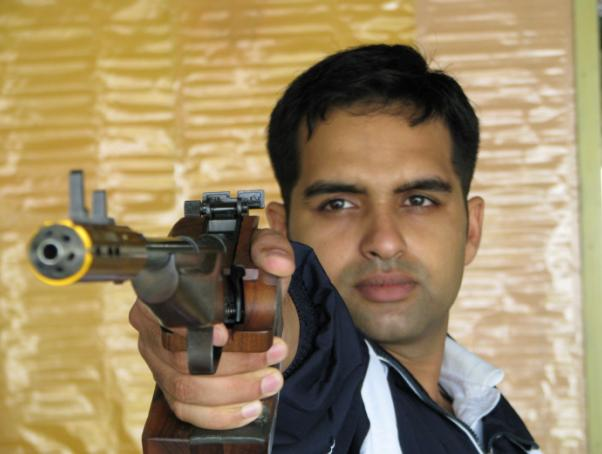

Personal information
- Nationality: Indian
- Born: 8 August 1984 (age 42) Kotma Colliery, Anuppur; Madhya Pradesh, India
- Height: 1.78 m (5 ft 10 in)
- Weight: 70 kg (154 lb)
- Military career
- Allegiance: India
- Branch: Indian Navy
- Rank: Master Chief Petty Officer 1st Class

Sport
- Country: India
- Sport: Shooting
- Club: Indian Navy
Medal record
Men's shooting
Representing India
Commonwealth Games
Gold medal – first place	2010 Delhi	10 m air pistol singles
Gold medal – first place	2010 Delhi	10 m air pistol pairs
Gold medal – first place	2010 Delhi	50 m air pistol singles
Silver medal – second place	2010 Delhi	50 m air pistol pairs
Commonwealth Championships
Gold medal – first place	2010 Delhi	10 m air pistol
Silver medal – second place	2017 Brisbane	10 m air pistol singles
World Cup
Silver medal – second place	2009 Australia	10 m air pistol badge
- Updated on 7 November 2017

Master Chief Petty Officer Omkar Singh (Hindi: ओमकार सिंह, born 8 August 1984) is an Indian sports shooter. He won three gold medals and a silver medal in shooting events at the 2010 Commonwealth Games held in Delhi. He hails from Anuppur district of Madhya Pradesh and is currently serving the Indian Navy.

On 5 October 2010, Omkar Singh and Deepak Sharma won a silver medal in the Men's 50 metre pistol pairs at the Commonwealth games. Omkar Singh won his first gold medal in the Men's 50 metre pistol singles on 6 October 2010. The next day, he paired up with Gurpreet Singh to win the gold medal in the Men's 10m Air Pistol (Pairs). On 8 October 2010, he won a gold medal in the Men's 10m Air Pistol (Single).

Omkar Singh belongs to the Kotma Colliery in the Anuppur district of Madhya Pradesh. His father was a teacher in the South Eastern Coal Fields Limited (SECL) School.

In 2012, he was given the Arjuna Award for outstanding performance in sport.

At the 55th World Military Shooting Championships in Norway, Singh won bronze in the 25m Centre Pistol event. In conjunction with the accumulated points from other events he won overall title of Best Male Pistol Shooter.
