= Lkhagvaagiin Undralbat =

Mongolian sports shooter (born 1965)

Personal information
- Nationality: Mongolian
- Born: 26 April 1965 (age 60)

Sport
- Sport: Sports shooting

Lkhagvaagiin Undralbat (born 26 April 1965) is a Mongolian sports shooter. He competed in two events at the 1988 Summer Olympics.
