= Wong Fai =

Hong Kong sport shooter

Personal information
- Nationality: Hong Kong
- Born: 6 January 1970 (age 56) Henan, China
- Height: 1.60 m (5 ft 3 in)
- Weight: 64 kg (141 lb)

Sport
- Sport: Shooting
- Event: 25 m rapid fire pistol (RFP)
- Club: Hong Kong Rifle Association
- Coached by: Tsui Yin Lam

Wong Fai (Chinese: 王輝; pinyin: Wáng Huī; Jyutping: wong^{4} fai^{1}; born January 6, 1970) is a Hong Kong sport shooter. Wong represented Hong Kong at the 2008 Summer Olympics in Beijing, where he competed in the men's 25 m rapid fire pistol. He finished only in eighteenth place by two points behind 47-year-old Australian sport shooter and two-time Olympian Bruce Quick, with a total score of 558 points (282 on the first stage, and 276 on the second).
