= Ayonika Paul =

Indian sport shooter (born 1992)

Ayonika Paul OLY
Personal information
- Nationality: Indian
- Born: 23 September 1992 (age 34) Mumbai, India
- Height: 163 cm (5 ft 4 in)

Sport
- Country: India
- Sport: Shooting
- Event: 10 metre air rifle
- Coached by: Thomas Farnik
Medal record
Women's shooting
Representing India
Asian Championships
Silver medal – second place	2012 Doha	10 m air rifle team
Commonwealth Games
Silver medal – second place	2014 Glasgow	10 m air rifle
- Updated on 26 July 2014

Ayonika Paul (born 23 September 1992) is an Indian shooter who competes in the 10 metre air rifle event. She won the silver medal in the 2014 Commonwealth Games in Glasgow.

Ayonika Paul was confirmed by the Selection Committee of NRAI to represent India at the Rio Olympics 2016, where she finished at 47th position in the qualification round out of 51 contestants.

== Early life ==
She was born in September 1992 at Mumbai, India and is the daughter of Ashim Paul, a Railway employee and Aparna Paul. She studied at Swami Vivekananda high school in Chembur, Mumbai. She graduated with a Bachelor of Engineering degree from Pillai's Institute of Information Technology Engineering, Media Studies & Research affiliated to University of Mumbai, — and has completed a Master's in Electronics Engineering. Ayonika Paul was once an excellent swimmer but slowly her interest developed in the rifle shooting. She had earlier won Bronze in ISSF World Cup 2014 in Slovenia.

She holds a BE Electronics degree and is a member of the National Rifle Association of India.

== Early Training ==
She started out as a swimming champion in her early days, with her father as the coach. However her interest turned to shooting in 2006, when she saw Rajyavardhan Singh Rathod at the Athens Olympics in 2004, where he won the silver medal for India.

She got her first rifle, an imported Feinwerkvan for Rs 1.2 lakh which her father provided for through loans and thus started her journey in shooting.

Her weekly practice was done at Pune, which had better training facilities and she had to juggle through her studies and shooting practice to achieve her goals.

== Career ==
2007- She won her first ever medal, double gold, at the international junior competition in Suhl, Germany.

2008- A gold medal at the International Junior Shooting Competition in Munich paved her way towards an international career and brought her into the limelight.

2011- She won a bronze medal at the Asian Junior Championships in Kuwait and was ranked third.

2012- She won the bronze medal at the Asian Airgun Championships in 2015 in the 10m for Women's 10m Air Rifle.

2014- As well as clinching the silver medal at the Commonwealth Games, held at Glasgow, Scotland she finished seventh in the women's 10-metre air rifle event at the 2014 Asian Games.

2015-She represents Maharashtra in the National Games and won the silver medal at the National Games held at Kerala.

2016- She won the silver medal at the Asia Olympic Qualifying Competition in New Delhi (IND) and thus became one of the qualifiers for shooting at the Rio Olympics, but had an early exit in the same. She was backed and supported by the NGO, Olympic Gold Quest for Rio.

2014-Bachelor in Electronics Engineering from Pillai's Institute of Information Technology Engineering, Media Studies & Research, New Panvel.

2018- Masters in Electronics Engineering specialising in Image Processing from University of Mumbai. Having worked on Real Time Adaptive Target Tracking using computer vision, her manuscript was published in Journal of Electronic Design Engineering.

== Accolades ==
She is a recipient of the Maharashtra government's Shiv Chhatrapati award.

== ISSF World Medal Tally ==
No.	Event	Championship	Year	Place	Medal
1	10m air rifle	ISSF World Cup	2014	Maribor	3rd place, bronze medalist(s)
