= Zhang Penghui =

Chinese sport shooter (born 1978)

Medal record

Men's shooting

Representing China

Asian Championships
Gold medal – first place	2007 Kuwait City	25 m rapid fire pistol
Gold medal – first place	2007 Kuwait City	25 m rapid fire pistol team
Silver medal – second place	2007 Kuwait City	25 m standard pistol team

Zhang Penghui (simplified Chinese: 张鹏辉; traditional Chinese: 張鵬輝; pinyin: Zhāng Pénghuī; born January 9, 1978, in Changzhou, Jiangsu) is a male Chinese sports shooter. He won the 2006 ISSF World Shooting Championships in 25 metre rapid fire pistol.

In the 2004 Summer Olympics, he finished seventh in the men's 25 metre rapid fire pistol competition. Four years later he competed, as the reigning World champion, on home soil in the 2008 Summer Olympics, but was disqualified during the second stage of the rapid fire pistol competition, for repeatedly violating the 45 degree rule, the rapid fire equivalent of a false start.

Current world records held in 25 metre rapid fire pistol
Men	Teams	1756	China (Zhang, Lin, Yao)	September 10, 2018	Changwon (KOR)
