= Tomohiro Kida =

Japanese sport shooter (born 1968)

Medal record

Men's shooting

Representing Japan

Asian Championships
Bronze medal – third place	2007 Kuwait City	25 m center fire pistol team
Bronze medal – third place	2007 Kuwait City	25 m rapid fire pistol team
Bronze medal – third place	2007 Kuwait City	25 m standard pistol team
Bronze medal – third place	2012 Doha	25 m standard pistol
Bronze medal – third place	2012 Doha	25 m standard pistol team

Tomohiro Kida (木田 知宏, Kida Tomohiro; born 5 January 1968) is a Japanese sport shooter who competed in the 1996 Summer Olympics.
