= Liu Zhongsheng =

Chinese sport shooter

Medal record

Men's shooting

Representing China

Asian Championships
Gold medal – first place	2007 Kuwait City	25 m rapid fire pistol team
Gold medal – first place	2007 Kuwait City	25 m standard pistol
Silver medal – second place	2007 Kuwait City	25 m standard pistol team

Liu Zhongsheng (born 1973-10-25 in Laiwu, Shandong) is a male Chinese sports shooter. He competed for Team China at the 2008 Summer Olympics.

== Major performances ==
- 1995 National Intercity Games - 1st rapid-fire pistol;
- 2006 World Cup Germany/Italy - 3rd rapid-fire pistol;
- 2006 World Championships - 1st team/2nd individual rapid-fire pistol;
- 2006 Asian Games - 1st rapid-fire pistol individual/team;
- 2007 Asian Championships - 1st standard pistol

== Records ==
Current world records held in 25 metre rapid fire pistol
Men	Teams	1756	China (Zhang, Lin, Yao)	September 10, 2018	Changwon (KOR)

- 2006 National Championships - 788.3, rapid-fire pistol team (NR)
- 2006 World Championships - 1743, rapid-fire pistol team (WR)
