= Jakkrit Panichpatikum =

Thai sports shooter (1973–2013)

Personal information
- Native name: จักรกฤษณ์ พณิชย์ผาติกรรม
- Nickname: X
- Nationality: Thai
- Born: January 31, 1973
- Died: October 19, 2013 (aged 40) Bangkok, Thailand
- Occupations: Sport shooter; actor
Medal record
Men's shooting
Representing Thailand
Asian Championships
Silver medal – second place	2012 Doha	25 m standard pistol team
Bronze medal – third place	2007 Kuwait City	50 m pistol
Bronze medal – third place	2012 Doha	25 m center fire pistol team

Jakkrit Panichpatikum (Thai: จักรกฤษณ์ พณิชย์ผาติกรรม; RTGS: Chakkrit Phanitphatikam; January 31, 1973 – October 19, 2013) was a Thai sport shooter who competed in the men's 10 metre air pistol, men's 50m pistol, and men's 25m rapid fire pistol.

At the 2012 Summer Olympics, he finished 37th in the qualifying round for the 10 metre air pistol event. He finished in 14th in the qualifying round for the 50 metre pistol competition and 15th in the qualifying round for the men's 25 metre rapid fire pistol.

== Assassination ==
He was shot dead on October 19, 2013, aged 40, after being attacked as he sat in his car, police said. On television the following month, his mother-in-law confessed responsibility for his assassination, which she said she had arranged in order to free her daughter, Dr. Nitiwadee Pucharoenyos, from spousal abuse which he had allegedly been inflicting for several years.

== Royal decoration ==
- 2005 - Commander (Third Class) of The Most Admirable Order of the Direkgunabhorn
