= Teruyoshi Akiyama =

Japanese sports shooter (born 1971)

Personal information
- Born: 25 December 1971 (age 54) Sendai, Japan

Sport
- Sport: Sports shooting
Medal record
Men's shooting
Representing Japan
Asian Championships
Bronze medal – third place	2007 Kuwait City	25 m center fire pistol team
Bronze medal – third place	2007 Kuwait City	25 m rapid fire pistol team
Bronze medal – third place	2007 Kuwait City	25 m standard pistol team
Bronze medal – third place	2012 Doha	25 m rapid fire pistol

Teruyoshi Akiyama (秋山 輝吉, Akiyama Teruyoshi; born 25 December 1971) is a Japanese sports shooter. He competed in the men's 25 metre rapid fire pistol event at the 2016 Summer Olympics.
