= Shooting at the 2006 Asian Games =

- Venue: Lusail Shooting Range
- Dates: 2–8 December 2006
- Competitors: 510 from 35 nations

Shooting was contested at the 2006 Asian Games in Doha, Qatar from December 2 to December 8, 2006. Men's and women's competitions were held in pistol, rifle, running target, and shotgun. All competition took place at the Lusail Shooting Range.

== Schedule ==
●	1st day	●	Final day	E	Elimination	Q	Qualification	F	Final

Event↓/Date →	2nd Sat		3rd Sun		4th Mon		5th Tue		6th Wed		7th Thu		8th Fri	
Men's 10 m air pistol			Q	F										
Men's 10 m air pistol team			●											
Men's 25 m center fire pistol													●	
Men's 25 m center fire pistol team													●	
Men's 25 m rapid fire pistol									Q	F				
Men's 25 m rapid fire pistol team									●					
Men's 25 m standard pistol											●			
Men's 25 m standard pistol team											●			
Men's 50 m pistol							Q	F						
Men's 50 m pistol team							●							
Men's 10 m air rifle	Q	F												
Men's 10 m air rifle team	●													
Men's 50 m rifle prone			E		Q	F								
Men's 50 m rifle prone team			●											
Men's 50 m rifle 3 positions											Q	F		
Men's 50 m rifle 3 positions team											●			
Men's 10 m running target							●							
Men's 10 m running target team							●							
Men's 10 m running target mixed									●					
Men's 10 m running target mixed team									●					
Men's trap	Q		Q	F										
Men's trap team	●		●											
Men's double trap							Q	F						
Men's double trap team							●							
Men's skeet											Q		Q	F
Men's skeet team											●		●	
Women's 10 m air pistol			Q	F										
Women's 10 m air pistol team			●											
Women's 25 m pistol							Q	F						
Women's 25 m pistol team							●							
Women's 10 m air rifle	Q	F												
Women's 10 m air rifle team	●													
Women's 50 m rifle prone					●									
Women's 50 m rifle prone team					●									
Women's 50 m rifle 3 positions									Q	F				
Women's 50 m rifle 3 positions team									●					
Women's 10 m running target					●									
Women's 10 m running target team					●									
Women's trap	Q	F												
Women's trap team	●													
Women's double trap							●							
Women's double trap team							●							
Women's skeet											Q	F		
Women's skeet team											●			

== Medalists ==
=== Men ===
Event	Gold	Silver	Bronze
10 m air pistol	Tan Zongliang; China	Kim Jong-su; North Korea	Jin Jong-oh; South Korea
10 m air pistol team	China; Lin Zhongzai; Pang Wei; Tan Zongliang	South Korea; Jin Jong-oh; Kim Young-wook; Lee Dae-myung	Vietnam; Hoàng Xuân Vinh; Nguyễn Mạnh Tường; Trần Quốc Cường
25 m center fire pistol	Jaspal Rana; India	Liu Guohui; China	Jakkrit Panichpatikum; Thailand
25 m center fire pistol team	India; Samaresh Jung; Vijay Kumar; Jaspal Rana	South Korea; Hong Seong-hwan; Jang Dae-kyu; Park Byung-taek	China; Liu Guohui; Liu Zhongsheng; Zhang Penghui
25 m rapid fire pistol	Liu Zhongsheng; China	Zhang Penghui; China	Vijay Kumar; India
25 m rapid fire pistol team	China; Liu Guohui; Liu Zhongsheng; Zhang Penghui	Japan; Teruyoshi Akiyama; Shigefumi Harada; Tomohiro Kida	Kazakhstan; Igor Shmotkin; Sergey Vokhmyanin; Vladimir Vokhmyanin
25 m standard pistol	Jaspal Rana; India	Park Byung-taek; South Korea	Vladimir Issachenko; Kazakhstan
25 m standard pistol team	South Korea; Hwang Yoon-sam; Jang Dae-kyu; Park Byung-taek	India; Samaresh Jung; Ronak Pandit; Jaspal Rana	Thailand; Pongpol Kulchairattana; Jakkrit Panichpatikum; Opas Ruengpanyawut
50 m pistol	Xu Kun; China	Rashid Yunusmetov; Kazakhstan	Kim Jong-su; North Korea
50 m pistol team	China; Pang Wei; Tan Zongliang; Xu Kun	North Korea; Kim Hyon-ung; Kim Jong-su; Ryu Myong-yon	South Korea; Jin Jong-oh; Kim Young-wook; Lee Sang-do
10 m air rifle	Liu Tianyou; China	Zhu Qinan; China	Yu Jae-chul; South Korea
10 m air rifle team	China; Li Jie; Liu Tianyou; Zhu Qinan	South Korea; Chae Keun-bae; Kim Hye-sung; Yu Jae-chul	India; Navanath Faratade; Gagan Narang; P. T. Raghunath
50 m rifle prone	Liu Gang; China	Igor Pirekeýew; Turkmenistan	Sergey Belyayev; Kazakhstan
50 m rifle prone team	Kazakhstan; Sergey Belyayev; Vitaliy Dovgun; Yuriy Melsitov	South Korea; Jeon Dong-ju; Lee Hyun-tae; Park Bong-duk	China; Liu Gang; Zhang Fu; Zhang Lei
50 m rifle 3 positions	Zhang Fu; China	Zhang Lei; China	Gagan Narang; India
50 m rifle 3 positions team	China; Liu Tianyou; Zhang Fu; Zhang Lei	Kazakhstan; Vitaliy Dovgun; Yuriy Melsitov; Yuriy Yurkov	India; Imran Hassan Khan; Gagan Narang; Sanjeev Rajput
10 m running target	Gan Lin; China	Rassim Mologly; Kazakhstan	Mohammed Amin Sobhi; Qatar
10 m running target team	Kazakhstan; Andrey Gurov; Bakhtiyar Ibrayev; Rassim Mologly	South Korea; Cho Se-jong; Hwang Young-do; Jeong You-jin	Qatar; Mohammed Abouteama; Khalid Al-Kuwari; Mohammed Amin Sobhi
10 m running target mixed	Gan Lin; China	Bakhtiyar Ibrayev; Kazakhstan	Andrey Gurov; Kazakhstan
10 m running target mixed team	Kazakhstan; Andrey Gurov; Bakhtiyar Ibrayev; Rassim Mologly	Qatar; Mohammed Abouteama; Khalid Al-Kuwari; Mohammed Amin Sobhi	Vietnam; Nguyễn Mạnh Cường; Nguyễn Văn Tùng; Trần Hoàng Vũ
Trap	Naser Al-Meqlad; Kuwait	Manavjit Singh Sandhu; India	Khaled Al-Mudhaf; Kuwait
Trap team	Kuwait; Abdulrahman Al-Faihan; Naser Al-Meqlad; Khaled Al-Mudhaf	India; Manavjit Singh Sandhu; Mansher Singh; Anwer Sultan	Lebanon; Talih Bou Kamel; Joseph Hanna; Joe Salem
Double trap	Wang Nan; China	Hu Binyuan; China	Rajyavardhan Singh Rathore; India
Double trap team	China; Hu Binyuan; Liu Anlong; Wang Nan	India; Vikram Bhatnagar; Rajyavardhan Singh Rathore; Ronjan Sodhi	Chinese Taipei; Chang Chien Ming-shan; Chen Shih-wei; Shih Wei-tin
Skeet	Salah Al-Mutairi; Kuwait	Saeed Al-Maktoum; United Arab Emirates	Jin Di; China
Skeet team	Kazakhstan; Sergey Kolos; Vladislav Mukhamediyev; Sergey Yakshin	Kuwait; Salah Al-Mutairi; Zaid Al-Mutairi; Abdullah Al-Rashidi	China; Jin Di; Li Xu; Qu Ridong

=== Women ===
Event	Gold	Silver	Bronze
10 m air pistol	Tao Luna; China	Guo Wenjun; China	Kim Byung-hee; South Korea
10 m air pistol team	China; Chen Ying; Guo Wenjun; Tao Luna	India; Shweta Chaudhary; Sonia Rai; Harveen Srao	South Korea; Boo Soon-hee; Kim Byung-hee; Lee Ho-lim
25 m pistol	Chen Ying; China	Tao Luna; China	Kim Byung-hee; South Korea
25 m pistol team	China; Cao Ying; Chen Ying; Tao Luna	Japan; Michiko Fukushima; Yoko Inada; Yukari Konishi	Mongolia; Otryadyn Gündegmaa; Gantömöriin Kherlentsetseg; Tsogbadrakhyn Mönkhzul
10 m air rifle	Du Li; China	Zhao Yinghui; China	Olga Dovgun; Kazakhstan
10 m air rifle team	China; Du Li; Wu Liuxi; Zhao Yinghui	Singapore; Adrienne Ser; Jasmine Ser; Vanessa Yong	India; Tejaswini Sawant; Suma Shirur; Avneet Sidhu
50 m rifle prone	Olga Dovgun; Kazakhstan	Thanyalak Chotphibunsin; Thailand	Wang Chengyi; China
50 m rifle prone team	Thailand; Thanyalak Chotphibunsin; Paramaporn Ponglaokham; Supamas Wankaew	China; Liu Bo; Wang Chengyi; Wu Liuxi	Kazakhstan; Olga Dovgun; Galina Korchma; Varvara Kovalenko
50 m rifle 3 positions	Wang Chengyi; China	Olga Dovgun; Kazakhstan	Na Yoon-kyung; South Korea
50 m rifle 3 positions team	China; Liu Bo; Wang Chengyi; Wu Liuxi	South Korea; Lee Hye-jin; Na Yoon-kyung; Yi Sang-soon	Kazakhstan; Olga Dovgun; Galina Korchma; Varvara Kovalenko
10 m running target	Xu Xuan; China	Natalya Gurova; Kazakhstan	Đặng Hồng Hà; Vietnam
10 m running target team	Kazakhstan; Yuliya Berner; Natalya Gurova; Anna Pushkaryova	Vietnam; Đặng Hồng Hà; Đỗ Thu Trà; Nguyễn Thị Thu Hằng	Qatar; Anisa Saleh Juma; Samsam Saleh Juma; Amal Mohammed
Trap	Chen Li; China	Zhu Mei; China	Lin Yi-chun; Chinese Taipei
Trap team	China; Chen Li; Wang Yujin; Zhu Mei	North Korea; Chae Hye-gyong; Kim Yong-bok; Pak Yong-hui	South Korea; Lee Bo-na; Lee Jung-a; Lee Myung-ae
Double trap	Son Hye-kyoung; South Korea	Janejira Srisongkram; Thailand	Lee Bo-na; South Korea
Double trap team	South Korea; Kim Mi-jin; Lee Bo-na; Son Hye-kyoung	China; Wang Yujin; Zhang Yafei; Zhu Mei	Thailand; Punnapa Asvanit; Supornpan Chewchalermmit; Janejira Srisongkram
Skeet	Kim Myong-hwa; North Korea	Wei Ning; China	Yu Xiumin; China
Skeet team	China; Wei Ning; Yu Xiumin; Zhang Donglian	North Korea; Kim Myong-hwa; Pak Jong-ran; Pak Kum-hui	South Korea; Kim Yeun-hee; Kwak Yu-hyun; Son Hye-kyoung

== Medal table ==
Rank	Nation	Gold	Silver	Bronze	Total
1	China (CHN)	27	12	6	45
2	Kazakhstan (KAZ)	6	6	7	19
3	South Korea (KOR)	3	7	10	20
4	India (IND)	3	5	6	14
5	Kuwait (KUW)	3	1	1	5
6	North Korea (PRK)	1	4	1	6
7	Thailand (THA)	1	2	3	6
8	Japan (JPN)	0	2	0	2
9	Qatar (QAT)	0	1	3	4
9	Vietnam (VIE)	0	1	3	4
11	Singapore (SIN)	0	1	0	1
11	Turkmenistan (TKM)	0	1	0	1
11	United Arab Emirates (UAE)	0	1	0	1
14	Chinese Taipei (TPE)	0	0	2	2
15	Lebanon (LIB)	0	0	1	1
15	Mongolia (MGL)	0	0	1	1
Totals (16 entries)		44	44	44	132

== Participating nations ==
A total of 510 athletes from 35 nations competed in shooting at the 2006 Asian Games:

- Bahrain (18)
- Bangladesh (5)
- China (40)
- Chinese Taipei (13)
- Hong Kong (8)
- India (33)
- Iran (11)
- Iraq (2)
- Japan (20)
- Kazakhstan (29)
- Kuwait (19)
- Kyrgyzstan (10)
- Lebanon (7)
- Macau (11)
- Malaysia (14)
- Maldives (6)
- Mongolia (12)
- Myanmar (1)
- Nepal (4)
- North Korea (13)
- Oman (8)
- Pakistan (12)
- Philippines (12)
- Qatar (45)
- Saudi Arabia (13)
- Singapore (9)
- South Korea (42)
- Sri Lanka (6)
- Syria (9)
- Tajikistan (5)
- Thailand (30)
- Turkmenistan (1)
- United Arab Emirates (8)
- Uzbekistan (5)
- Vietnam (29)
