= Shooting at the Asian Games =

- Governing bodies: ISSF (World) / ASC (Asia)
- Events: 28 (men: 12; women: 12; mixed: 4)

Games
- 1951; 1954; 1958; 1962; 1966; 1970; 1974; 1978; 1982; 1986; 1990; 1994; 1998; 2002; 2006; 2010; 2014; 2018; 2022; 2026
- Medalists; Records

Shooting sports events have been held at every Asian Games since 1954 Asian Games in Manila.

== Editions ==
Games	Year	Host city	Best nation
II	1954	Manila, Philippines	Philippines
III	1958	Tokyo, Japan	Japan
IV	1962	Jakarta, Indonesia	Japan
V	1966	Bangkok, Thailand	Japan
VI	1970	Bangkok, Thailand	Japan
VII	1974	Tehran, Iran	North Korea
VIII	1978	Bangkok, Thailand	China
IX	1982	New Delhi, India	China
X	1986	Seoul, South Korea	China
XI	1990	Beijing, China	China
XII	1994	Hiroshima, Japan	China
XIII	1998	Bangkok, Thailand	China
XIV	2002	Busan, South Korea	China
XV	2006	Doha, Qatar	China
XVI	2010	Guangzhou, China	China
XVII	2014	Incheon, South Korea	China
XVIII	2018	Jakarta–Palembang, Indonesia	China
XIX	2022	Hangzhou, China	China
XX	2026	Aichi–Nagoya, Japan	China

== Events ==
Legend

- M — Men
- MT — Men's team
- O — Open
- OT — Open's team
- W — Women
- WT — Women's team
- XT — Mixed team

=== Pistol ===
Event	54	58	62	66	70	74	78	82	86	90	94	98	02	06	10	14	18	22	26	Years
Pistol
10 m air pistol						O OT	O OT	O OT	M MT; W WT	M MT; W WT	M MT; W WT	M MT; W WT	M MT; W WT	M MT; W WT	M MT; W WT	M MT; W WT	M W XT	M MT; W WT; XT	M MT; W WT; XT	14
25 m center fire pistol				O OT	O OT	O OT	O OT	O OT	M MT	M MT	M MT	M MT	M MT	M MT	M MT	M MT				13
25 m rapid fire pistol	O	O	O	O OT	O OT	O OT	O OT	O OT	M MT	M MT	M MT	M MT	M MT	M MT	M MT	M MT	M	M MT	M MT	19
25 m sport pistol									W WT	W WT	W WT	W WT	W WT	W WT	W WT	W WT	W	W WT	W WT	11
25 m standard pistol						O OT	O OT	O OT	M MT	M MT	M MT	M MT	M MT	M MT	M MT	M MT				11
50 m free pistol	O	O	O	O OT	O OT	O OT	O OT	O OT	M MT	M MT	M MT	M MT	M MT	M MT	M MT	M MT				16
Rifle
10 m air rifle				O OT	O OT	O OT	O OT	O OT	M MT; W WT	M MT; W WT	M MT; W WT	M MT; W WT	M MT; W WT	M MT; W WT	M MT; W WT	M MT; W WT	M W XT	M MT; W WT; XT	M MT; W WT; XT	16
50 m rifle prone	O	O	O	O OT	O OT	O OT	O OT	O OT	M MT	M MT; W WT	M MT; W WT	M MT; W WT	M MT; W WT	M MT; W WT	M MT; W WT	M MT; W WT				16
50 m rifle kneeling											M									1
50 m rifle standing											M									1
50 m rifle 3 positions	O	O	O	O OT	O OT	O OT	O OT	O OT	M MT; W WT	M MT; W WT	M MT; W WT	M MT; W WT	M MT; W WT	M MT; W WT	M MT; W WT	M MT; W WT	M W	M MT; W WT	M MT; W WT	19
50 m standard rifle 3 positions				O OT	O OT	O OT	O OT	O OT	M MT											6
300 m rifle 3 positions	O	O	O																	3
300 m standard rifle																	M			1
Running target
10 m running target										M MT			M MT; W WT	M MT; W WT	M MT; W WT	M MT; W WT	M	M MT; W WT		7
10 m running target mixed														M MT	M MT	M MT	M	M MT		5
50 m running target										M MT										1
50 m running target mixed										M MT										1
Shotgun
Trap	O	O				O OT	O OT	O OT	O OT	M MT; W WT	M MT	M MT	M MT; W WT	M MT; W WT	M MT; W WT	M MT; W WT	M W XT	M MT; W WT	M MT; W WT; XT	16
Double trap											M W	M MT; W WT	M MT; W WT	M MT; W WT	M MT; W WT	M MT; W WT	M W			7
Skeet						O OT	O OT	O OT	O OT	M MT; W WT	M MT	M MT	M MT; W WT	M MT; W WT	M MT; W WT	M MT; W WT	M W	M MT; W WT; XT	M MT; W WT; XT	14
Total	6	6	5	14	14	22	22	22	30	40	34	34	42	44	44	44	20	33	28	

== Medal table ==
Rank	Nation	Gold	Silver	Bronze	Total
1	China (CHN)	221	134	84	439
2	South Korea (KOR)	68	98	103	269
3	Japan (JPN)	54	44	55	153
4	North Korea (PRK)	41	41	30	112
5	Kazakhstan (KAZ)	21	25	35	81
6	India (IND)	19	38	38	95
7	Kuwait (KUW)	14	14	5	33
8	Thailand (THA)	11	29	39	79
9	Chinese Taipei (TPE)	6	7	8	21
10	Philippines (PHI)	5	12	15	32
11	Qatar (QAT)	5	3	9	17
12	Mongolia (MGL)	3	4	8	15
13	Israel (ISR)	2	4	2	8
14	Indonesia (INA)	2	3	6	11
15	Turkmenistan (TKM)	2	2	0	4
16	Vietnam (VIE)	1	6	16	23
17	Uzbekistan (UZB)	1	4	5	10
18	Iran (IRI)	1	4	4	9
19	Singapore (SGP)	1	1	4	6
20	Lebanon (LBN)	1	1	3	5
21	Saudi Arabia (KSA)	1	1	0	2
22	Malaysia (MAS)	0	3	3	6
23	Kyrgyzstan (KGZ)	0	3	1	4
24	United Arab Emirates (UAE)	0	2	2	4
25	Myanmar (MYA)	0	0	4	4
26	Hong Kong (HKG)	0	0	3	3
27	Pakistan (PAK)	0	0	1	1
Totals (27 entries)		480	483	483	1,446
