= Shooting at the 2006 Asian Games – Women's 50 metre rifle three positions team =

Women's 50 metre rifle 3 positions team at the 2006 Asian Games
- Venue: Lusail Shooting Range
- Dates: 6 December 2006
- Competitors: 33 from 11 nations

Medalists
gold medal	China; Liu Bo, Wang Chengyi, Wu Liuxi
silver medal	South Korea; Lee Hye-jin, Na Yoon-kyung, Yi Sang-soon
bronze medal	Kazakhstan; Olga Dovgun, Galina Korchma, Varvara Kovalenko

The women's 50 metre rifle three positions team competition at the 2006 Asian Games in Doha, Qatar was held on 6 December at the Lusail Shooting Range.

== Schedule ==
All times are Arabia Standard Time (UTC+03:00)

Date	Time	Event
Wednesday, 6 December 2006	08:00	Final

== Records ==
Prior to this competition, the existing world, Asian and Games records were as follows.

World Record	China	1754	Barcelona, Spain	24 July 1998
Asian Record	China	1754	Barcelona, Spain	24 July 1998
Games Record	China	1754	Busan, South Korea	6 October 2002

== Results ==
Rank	Team	Prone		Standing		Kneeling		Total	Notes
Rank	Team	1	2	1	2	1	2	Total	Notes
1st place, gold medalist(s)	China (CHN)	297	297	286	287	289	288	1744	
	Liu Bo	99	99	93	96	97	97	581	
	Wang Chengyi	98	99	97	95	99	97	585	
	Wu Liuxi	100	99	96	96	93	94	578	
2nd place, silver medalist(s)	South Korea (KOR)	295	295	289	282	290	288	1739	
	Lee Hye-jin	99	100	98	92	95	97	581	
	Na Yoon-kyung	97	98	95	95	99	97	581	
	Yi Sang-soon	99	97	96	95	96	94	577	
3rd place, bronze medalist(s)	Kazakhstan (KAZ)	295	298	280	284	286	288	1731	
	Olga Dovgun	98	100	94	98	98	98	586	
	Galina Korchma	98	99	94	95	95	97	578	
	Varvara Kovalenko	99	99	92	91	93	93	567	
4	Thailand (THA)	296	292	283	273	292	283	1719	
	Ratchadaporn Plengsaengthong	99	97	92	91	98	96	573	
	Paramaporn Ponglaokham	98	97	93	92	96	96	572	
	Supamas Wankaew	99	98	98	90	98	91	574	
5	India (IND)	297	295	285	275	284	281	1717	
	Anjali Bhagwat	98	98	95	92	95	91	569	
	Deepali Deshpande	99	98	95	92	94	92	570	
	Tejaswini Sawant	100	99	95	91	95	98	578	
6	Vietnam (VIE)	291	294	280	280	280	284	1709	
	Đàm Thị Nga	94	98	94	92	93	94	565	
	Nguyễn Thị Hòa	98	99	94	93	92	96	572	
	Thẩm Thúy Hồng	99	97	92	95	95	94	572	
7	Uzbekistan (UZB)	291	290	282	281	279	282	1705	
	Yana Fatkhi	98	95	94	93	94	97	571	
	Elena Kuznetsova	97	98	94	95	92	93	569	
	Sakina Mamedova	96	97	94	93	93	92	565	
8	Mongolia (MGL)	291	286	281	278	282	284	1702	
	Zorigtyn Batkhuyag	98	98	92	95	95	91	569	
	Damdinsürengiin Lkhamsüren	95	92	94	91	93	96	561	
	Chuluunbadrakhyn Narantuyaa	98	96	95	92	94	97	572	
9	Malaysia (MAS)	289	289	269	274	277	276	1674	
	Nor Dalilah Abu Bakar	97	96	83	88	92	95	551	
	Mariani Rafali	96	95	89	90	89	89	548	
	Nur Suryani Taibi	96	98	97	96	96	92	575	
10	Bahrain (BRN)	290	285	257	260	269	270	1631	
	Ruqaya Al-Rowaiei	94	93	88	84	88	89	536	
	Lulwa Al-Zayani	98	96	85	85	91	94	549	
	Aysha Suwaileh	98	96	84	91	90	87	546	
11	Qatar (QAT)	286	282	255	255	269	261	1608	
	Mahbubeh Akhlaghi	95	93	88	89	89	84	538	
	Matara Al-Aseiri	94	94	77	79	94	91	529	
	Maytha Al-Kubaisi	97	95	90	87	86	86	541	
