= Shooting at the 2006 Asian Games – Men's 10 metre air rifle team =

Men's 10 metre air rifle team at the 2006 Asian Games
- Venue: Lusail Shooting Range
- Dates: 2 December 2006
- Competitors: 45 from 15 nations

Medalists
gold medal	China; Li Jie, Liu Tianyou, Zhu Qinan
silver medal	South Korea; Chae Keun-bae, Kim Hye-sung, Yu Jae-chul
bronze medal	India; Navanath Faratade, Gagan Narang, P. T. Raghunath

The men's 10 metre air rifle team competition at the 2006 Asian Games in Doha, Qatar was held on 2 December at the Lusail Shooting Range.

== Schedule ==
All times are Arabia Standard Time (UTC+03:00)

Date	Time	Event
Saturday, 2 December 2006	08:00	Final

== Records ==
Prior to this competition, the existing world, Asian and Games records were as follows.

World Record	China	1788	Busan, South Korea	2 October 2002
Asian Record	China	1788	Busan, South Korea	2 October 2002
Games Record	China	1788	Busan, South Korea	2 October 2002

== Results ==
Legend

- DNS — Did not start

Rank	Team	Series						Total	Notes
Rank	Team	1	2	3	4	5	6	Total	Notes
1st place, gold medalist(s)	China (CHN)	298	299	296	297	299	297	1786	
	Li Jie	98	100	98	99	100	99	594	
	Liu Tianyou	100	100	100	100	99	99	598	
	Zhu Qinan	100	99	98	98	100	99	594	
2nd place, silver medalist(s)	South Korea (KOR)	296	297	295	296	299	294	1777	
	Chae Keun-bae	98	99	99	99	100	96	591	
	Kim Hye-sung	98	100	97	98	99	98	590	
	Yu Jae-chul	100	98	99	99	100	100	596	
3rd place, bronze medalist(s)	India (IND)	294	300	295	297	297	293	1776	
	Navanath Faratade	97	100	99	98	100	95	589	
	Gagan Narang	99	100	99	99	98	100	595	
	P. T. Raghunath	98	100	97	100	99	98	592	
4	Japan (JPN)	296	296	297	292	293	295	1769	
	Tadashi Maki	100	98	99	97	98	97	589	
	Takayuki Matsumoto	98	99	99	99	98	99	592	
	Toshikazu Yamashita	98	99	99	96	97	99	588	
5	Singapore (SIN)	293	291	293	294	295	293	1759	
	Jonathan Koh	97	96	97	100	100	96	586	
	Ong Jun Hong	99	98	99	97	97	97	587	
	Zhang Jin	97	97	97	97	98	100	586	
6	Kazakhstan (KAZ)	292	290	297	290	295	294	1758	
	Vitaliy Dovgun	97	96	100	96	99	99	587	
	Yuriy Melsitov	97	97	99	97	98	96	584	
	Yuriy Yurkov	98	97	98	97	98	99	587	
7	Thailand (THA)	289	289	294	292	298	292	1754	
	Tevarit Majchacheep	98	95	98	97	99	100	587	
	Varavut Majchacheep	95	100	98	99	99	94	585	
	Thanapat Thananchai	96	94	98	96	100	98	582	
8	Kyrgyzstan (KGZ)	289	291	291	294	291	296	1752	
	Ruslan Ismailov	98	99	98	99	99	100	593	
	Tachir Ismailov	95	94	96	97	97	98	577	
	Yuri Lomov	96	98	97	98	95	98	582	
9	Kuwait (KUW)	287	292	289	296	293	287	1744	
	Husain Al-Ajmi	93	100	96	100	96	99	584	
	Khaled Al-Subaie	98	99	97	99	99	95	587	
	Meshal Al-Tahous	96	93	96	97	98	93	573	
10	Mongolia (MGL)	289	291	293	291	291	287	1742	
	Tömörbaataryn Bayarjargal	95	97	98	97	94	94	575	
	Olzodyn Enkhsaikhan	95	98	98	96	99	96	582	
	Tsedevdorjiin Mönkh-Erdene	99	96	97	98	98	97	585	
11	Bangladesh (BAN)	287	289	287	288	292	294	1737	
	Mohammad Imam Hossain	97	97	97	99	98	97	585	
	Asif Hossain Khan	98	100	96	97	97	100	588	
	Anjan Kumer Singha	92	92	94	92	97	97	564	
12	Saudi Arabia (KSA)	286	287	291	290	287	287	1728	
	Faiz Al-Anazi	95	94	98	97	94	91	569	
	Khalid Al-Anazi	97	96	95	97	97	99	581	
	Thunayan Al-Thunayan	94	97	98	96	96	97	578	
13	Qatar (QAT)	281	286	288	290	288	282	1715	
	Abdulla Al-Ahmad	96	98	99	99	95	95	582	
	Abdulaziz Al-Jabri	95	94	96	96	96	95	572	
	Abdulla Al-Madeed	90	94	93	95	97	92	561	
14	Pakistan (PAK)	278	281	286	284	288	282	1699	
	Muhammad Mushtaq	95	91	96	96	93	91	562	
	Ayaz Tahir	92	93	92	92	96	93	558	
	Siddique Umer	91	97	98	96	99	98	579	
—	Vietnam (VIE)							DNS	
	Nguyễn Tấn Nam							DNS	
	Trần Văn Ngọc							DNS	
	Vũ Khánh Hải							DNS	
