= Shooting at the 2006 Asian Games – Men's 10 metre air rifle =

Men's 10 metre air rifle at the 2006 Asian Games
- Venue: Lusail Shooting Range
- Dates: 2 December 2006
- Competitors: 54 from 23 nations

Medalists
gold medal	Liu Tianyou	China
silver medal	Zhu Qinan	China
bronze medal	Yu Jae-chul	South Korea

The men's 10 metre air rifle competition at the 2006 Asian Games in Doha, Qatar was held on 2 December at the Lusail Shooting Range.

== Schedule ==
All times are Arabia Standard Time (UTC+03:00)

Date	Time	Event
Saturday, 2 December 2006	08:00	Qualification
Saturday, 2 December 2006	14:15	Final

== Records ==
Prior to this competition, the existing world, Asian and Games records were as follows.

Qualification
World Record	Tevarit Majchacheep (THA)	600	Langkawi, Malaysia	27 January 2000
Asian Record	Tevarit Majchacheep (THA)	600	Langkawi, Malaysia	27 January 2000
Games Record	Masaru Yanagida (JPN)	597	Bangkok, Thailand	10 December 1998
Final
World Record	Thomas Farnik (AUT)	703.1	Granada, Spain	4 October 2006
Asian Record	Zhu Qinan (CHN)	702.7	Athens, Greece	16 August 2004
Games Record	Li Jie (CHN)	700.8	Busan, South Korea	2 October 2002

== Results ==
Legend

- DNS — Did not start

=== Qualification ===
Rank	Athlete	Series						Total	Notes
Rank	Athlete	1	2	3	4	5	6	Total	Notes
1	Liu Tianyou (CHN)	100	100	100	100	99	99	598	GR
2	Yu Jae-chul (KOR)	100	98	99	99	100	100	596	
3	Gagan Narang (IND)	99	100	99	99	98	100	595	
4	Li Jie (CHN)	98	100	98	99	100	99	594	
5	Zhu Qinan (CHN)	100	99	98	98	100	99	594	
6	Ruslan Ismailov (KGZ)	98	99	98	99	99	100	593	
7	Takayuki Matsumoto (JPN)	98	99	99	99	98	99	592	
8	P. T. Raghunath (IND)	98	100	97	100	99	98	592	
9	Chae Keun-bae (KOR)	98	99	99	99	100	96	591	
10	Vyacheslav Skoromnov (UZB)	98	98	99	98	99	98	590	
11	Kim Hye-sung (KOR)	98	100	97	98	99	98	590	
12	Tadashi Maki (JPN)	100	98	99	97	98	97	589	
13	Navanath Faratade (IND)	97	100	99	98	100	95	589	
14	Asif Hossain Khan (BAN)	98	100	96	97	97	100	588	
15	Toshikazu Yamashita (JPN)	98	99	99	96	97	99	588	
16	Mohd Hameleay Mutalib (MAS)	99	98	97	97	100	97	588	
17	Tevarit Majchacheep (THA)	98	95	98	97	99	100	587	
18	Vitaliy Dovgun (KAZ)	97	96	100	96	99	99	587	
19	Yuriy Yurkov (KAZ)	98	97	98	97	98	99	587	
20	Ong Jun Hong (SIN)	99	98	99	97	97	97	587	
21	Khaled Al-Subaie (KUW)	98	99	97	99	99	95	587	
22	Zhang Jin (SIN)	97	97	97	97	98	100	586	
23	Jonathan Koh (SIN)	97	96	97	100	100	96	586	
24	Mohammad Imam Hossain (BAN)	97	97	97	99	98	97	585	
25	Tsedevdorjiin Mönkh-Erdene (MGL)	99	96	97	98	98	97	585	
26	Varavut Majchacheep (THA)	95	100	98	99	99	94	585	
27	Husain Al-Ajmi (KUW)	93	100	96	100	96	99	584	
28	Yuriy Melsitov (KAZ)	97	97	99	97	98	96	584	
29	Igor Pirekeyev (TKM)	97	98	98	96	98	96	583	
30	Thanapat Thananchai (THA)	96	94	98	96	100	98	582	
31	Yuri Lomov (KGZ)	96	98	97	98	95	98	582	
32	Olzodyn Enkhsaikhan (MGL)	95	98	98	96	99	96	582	
33	Abdulla Al-Ahmad (QAT)	96	98	99	99	95	95	582	
34	Khalid Al-Anazi (KSA)	97	96	95	97	97	99	581	
35	Siddique Umer (PAK)	91	97	98	96	99	98	579	
36	Thunayan Al-Thunayan (KSA)	94	97	98	96	96	97	578	
37	Tachir Ismailov (KGZ)	95	94	96	97	97	98	577	
38	Tömörbaataryn Bayarjargal (MGL)	95	97	98	97	94	94	575	
39	Mangala Samarakoon (SRI)	93	97	95	95	97	97	574	
40	Meshal Al-Tahous (KUW)	96	93	96	97	98	93	573	
41	Salman Hasan Zaman (BRN)	95	93	97	95	95	97	572	
42	Abdulaziz Al-Jabri (QAT)	95	94	96	96	96	95	572	
43	Faiz Al-Anazi (KSA)	95	94	98	97	94	91	569	
44	Anjan Kumer Singha (BAN)	92	92	94	92	97	97	564	
45	Aseem Yadav (NEP)	91	95	91	94	97	96	564	
46	Jamal Al-Sebbah (BRN)	91	91	97	93	96	96	564	
47	Muhammad Mushtaq (PAK)	95	91	96	96	93	91	562	
48	Abdulla Al-Madeed (QAT)	90	94	93	95	97	92	561	
49	Qutaiba Yasin (IRQ)	90	94	91	93	95	96	559	
50	Ayaz Tahir (PAK)	92	93	92	92	96	93	558	
51	Karimkhon Boboev (TJK)	95	90	91	85	86	86	533	
—	Nguyễn Tấn Nam (VIE)							DNS	
—	Trần Văn Ngọc (VIE)							DNS	
—	Vũ Khánh Hải (VIE)							DNS	

=== Final ===
Rank	Athlete	Qual.	Final											Total	S-off	Notes
Rank	Athlete	Qual.	1	2	3	4	5	6	7	8	9	10	Total	Total	S-off	Notes
1st place, gold medalist(s)	Liu Tianyou (CHN)	598	9.3	10.5	10.6	10.2	10.3	10.2	10.4	10.1	10.7	10.5	102.8	700.8		
2nd place, silver medalist(s)	Zhu Qinan (CHN)	594	9.9	10.6	10.7	10.7	10.1	10.3	10.9	10.7	10.6	9.8	104.3	698.3		
3rd place, bronze medalist(s)	Yu Jae-chul (KOR)	596	9.8	10.4	10.7	10.1	10.3	10.0	10.5	10.0	9.7	10.4	101.9	697.9		
4	Li Jie (CHN)	594	10.4	10.2	10.2	10.8	10.8	10.1	10.3	10.0	10.2	10.6	103.6	697.6		
5	Gagan Narang (IND)	595	10.1	10.1	9.9	10.2	9.9	10.4	10.6	10.0	10.2	10.0	101.4	696.4		
6	Ruslan Ismailov (KGZ)	593	10.8	9.3	10.3	10.6	10.4	10.5	9.2	10.6	10.6	10.4	102.7	695.7		
7	Takayuki Matsumoto (JPN)	592	10.5	10.1	10.5	10.2	9.4	10.6	10.5	10.4	10.0	10.8	103.0	695.0		
8	P. T. Raghunath (IND)	592	9.8	9.9	10.9	9.8	10.5	10.3	10.4	10.2	10.4	9.7	101.9	693.9		
