= Shooting at the 2006 Asian Games – Women's 50 metre rifle three positions =

Women's 50 metre rifle 3 positions at the 2006 Asian Games
- Venue: Lusail Shooting Range
- Dates: 6 December 2006
- Competitors: 40 from 15 nations

Medalists
gold medal	Wang Chengyi	China
silver medal	Olga Dovgun	Kazakhstan
bronze medal	Na Yoon-kyung	South Korea

The women's 50 metre rifle three positions competition at the 2006 Asian Games in Doha, Qatar was held on 6 December at the Lusail Shooting Range.

== Schedule ==
All times are Arabia Standard Time (UTC+03:00)

Date	Time	Event
Wednesday, 6 December 2006	08:00	Qualification
Wednesday, 6 December 2006	11:30	Final

== Records ==
Prior to this competition, the existing world, Asian and Games records were as follows.

Qualification
World Record	Sonja Pfeilschifter (GER)	594	Munich, Germany	28 May 2006
Asian Record	Shan Hong (CHN)	592	Milan, Italy	28 May 1999
Games Record	Du Li (CHN)	588	Busan, South Korea	6 October 2002
Final
World Record	Sonja Pfeilschifter (GER)	698.0	Munich, Germany	28 May 2006
Asian Record	Liu Bo (CHN)	690.1	Guangzhou, China	30 March 2006
Games Record	Du Li (CHN)	685.5	Busan, South Korea	6 October 2002

== Results ==
Legend

- DNS — Did not start

=== Qualification ===
Rank	Athlete	Prone		Standing		Kneeling		Total	Notes
Rank	Athlete	1	2	1	2	1	2	Total	Notes
1	Olga Dovgun (KAZ)	98	100	94	98	98	98	586	
2	Wang Chengyi (CHN)	98	99	97	95	99	97	585	
3	Na Yoon-kyung (KOR)	97	98	95	95	99	97	581	
4	Liu Bo (CHN)	99	99	93	96	97	97	581	
5	Lee Hye-jin (KOR)	99	100	98	92	95	97	581	
6	Tejaswini Sawant (IND)	100	99	95	91	95	98	578	
7	Galina Korchma (KAZ)	98	99	94	95	95	97	578	
8	Wu Liuxi (CHN)	100	99	96	96	93	94	578	
9	Yi Sang-soon (KOR)	99	97	96	95	96	94	577	
10	Nur Suryani Taibi (MAS)	96	98	97	96	96	92	575	
11	Supamas Wankaew (THA)	99	98	98	90	98	91	574	
12	Ratchadaporn Plengsaengthong (THA)	99	97	92	91	98	96	573	
13	Chuluunbadrakhyn Narantuyaa (MGL)	98	96	95	92	94	97	572	
14	Paramaporn Ponglaokham (THA)	98	97	93	92	96	96	572	
15	Nguyễn Thị Hòa (VIE)	98	99	94	93	92	96	572	
16	Thẩm Thúy Hồng (VIE)	99	97	92	95	95	94	572	
17	Yoko Minamoto (JPN)	100	97	92	89	96	97	571	
18	Yana Fatkhi (UZB)	98	95	94	93	94	97	571	
19	Deepali Deshpande (IND)	99	98	95	92	94	92	570	
20	Elena Kuznetsova (UZB)	97	98	94	95	92	93	569	
21	Zorigtyn Batkhuyag (MGL)	98	98	92	95	95	91	569	
22	Anjali Bhagwat (IND)	98	98	95	92	95	91	569	
23	Elaheh Ahmadi (IRI)	97	96	96	94	90	94	567	
24	Varvara Kovalenko (KAZ)	99	99	92	91	93	93	567	
25	Seiko Iwata (JPN)	98	98	91	96	92	92	567	
26	Đàm Thị Nga (VIE)	94	98	94	92	93	94	565	
27	Sakina Mamedova (UZB)	96	97	94	93	93	92	565	
28	Damdinsürengiin Lkhamsüren (MGL)	95	92	94	91	93	96	561	
29	Devika Ranasinghe (SRI)	97	98	89	90	94	92	560	
30	Nor Dalilah Abu Bakar (MAS)	97	96	83	88	92	95	551	
31	Lulwa Al-Zayani (BRN)	98	96	85	85	91	94	549	
32	Priyanthi Kumari (SRI)	96	97	87	81	94	93	548	
33	Mariani Rafali (MAS)	96	95	89	90	89	89	548	
34	Yulia Kaleeva (KGZ)	94	99	82	92	90	90	547	
35	Aysha Suwaileh (BRN)	98	96	84	91	90	87	546	
36	Maytha Al-Kubaisi (QAT)	97	95	90	87	86	86	541	
37	Mahbubeh Akhlaghi (QAT)	95	93	88	89	89	84	538	
38	Ruqaya Al-Rowaiei (BRN)	94	93	88	84	88	89	536	
39	Matara Al-Aseiri (QAT)	94	94	77	79	94	91	529	
—	Cholpon Tumenbaeva (KGZ)							DNS	

=== Final ===
Rank	Athlete	Qual.	Final											Total	S-off	Notes
Rank	Athlete	Qual.	1	2	3	4	5	6	7	8	9	10	Total	Total	S-off	Notes
1st place, gold medalist(s)	Wang Chengyi (CHN)	585	10.1	9.9	10.1	10.1	10.6	10.1	9.9	9.2	10.5	9.9	100.4	685.4		
2nd place, silver medalist(s)	Olga Dovgun (KAZ)	586	9.3	9.8	9.8	9.8	10.3	9.8	9.4	8.9	10.2	9.0	96.3	682.3		
3rd place, bronze medalist(s)	Na Yoon-kyung (KOR)	581	10.1	10.2	9.1	10.5	9.5	9.7	10.8	8.4	10.2	10.7	99.2	680.2		
4	Wu Liuxi (CHN)	578	10.5	10.0	10.3	10.0	10.7	10.1	9.5	10.1	10.1	9.8	101.1	679.1		
5	Lee Hye-jin (KOR)	581	9.5	9.4	9.1	10.7	9.5	10.4	10.2	9.4	10.4	9.4	98.0	679.0		
6	Liu Bo (CHN)	581	10.7	8.7	10.1	8.8	10.5	9.6	9.8	9.6	9.8	9.6	97.2	678.2		
7	Tejaswini Sawant (IND)	578	7.9	10.5	9.0	10.1	9.9	9.0	9.5	9.0	9.9	10.1	94.9	672.9		
8	Galina Korchma (KAZ)	578	9.0	9.4	8.3	10.1	9.3	9.6	10.5	9.6	8.9	9.9	94.6	672.6		
