= Shooting at the 2006 Asian Games – Women's 50 metre rifle prone =

Women's 50 metre rifle prone at the 2006 Asian Games
- Venue: Lusail Shooting Range
- Dates: 4 December 2006
- Competitors: 40 from 15 nations

Medalists
gold medal	Olga Dovgun	Kazakhstan
silver medal	Thanyalak Chotphibunsin	Thailand
bronze medal	Wang Chengyi	China

The women's 50 metre rifle prone competition at the 2006 Asian Games in Doha, Qatar was held on 4 December at the Lusail Shooting Range.

== Schedule ==
All times are Arabia Standard Time (UTC+03:00)

Date	Time	Event
Monday, 4 December 2006	09:45	Final

== Records ==
Prior to this competition, the existing world, Asian and Games records were as follows.

World Record	Marina Bobkova (RUS)	597	Barcelona, Spain	19 July 1998
Asian Record	Olga Dovgun (KAZ)	597	Lahti, Finland	4 July 2002
Games Record	Olga Dovgun (KAZ)	597	Busan, South Korea	4 October 2002

== Results ==
Legend

- DNS — Did not start

Rank	Athlete	Series						Total	Notes
Rank	Athlete	1	2	3	4	5	6	Total	Notes
1st place, gold medalist(s)	Olga Dovgun (KAZ)	99	97	97	100	99	99	591	
2nd place, silver medalist(s)	Thanyalak Chotphibunsin (THA)	99	98	98	98	99	99	591	
3rd place, bronze medalist(s)	Wang Chengyi (CHN)	98	100	98	99	98	98	591	
4	Supamas Wankaew (THA)	96	98	100	98	99	99	590	
5	Na Yoon-kyung (KOR)	98	97	98	98	100	98	589	
6	Yi Sang-soon (KOR)	99	98	95	98	97	99	586	
7	Paramaporn Ponglaokham (THA)	97	100	97	98	98	96	586	
8	Galina Korchma (KAZ)	97	99	97	96	96	100	585	
9	Liu Bo (CHN)	98	99	98	98	96	96	585	
10	Wu Liuxi (CHN)	96	97	96	98	98	99	584	
11	Nur Suryani Taibi (MAS)	94	97	98	96	99	99	583	
12	Hwang Su-hyun (KOR)	94	97	97	100	94	100	582	
13	Yana Fatkhi (UZB)	98	92	96	98	99	98	581	
14	Varvara Kovalenko (KAZ)	98	97	97	94	97	98	581	
15	Tejaswini Sawant (IND)	98	98	96	97	95	97	581	
16	Lulwa Al-Zayani (BRN)	96	95	96	97	98	98	580	
17	Zorigtyn Batkhuyag (MGL)	96	98	95	98	94	98	579	
18	Nguyễn Thị Hòa (VIE)	97	98	96	97	95	96	579	
19	Mahbubeh Akhlaghi (QAT)	98	98	96	96	96	95	579	
20	Deepali Deshpande (IND)	97	96	97	94	95	99	578	
21	Anjali Bhagwat (IND)	96	99	95	96	96	96	578	
22	Matara Al-Aseiri (QAT)	97	98	95	96	97	95	578	
23	Elena Kuznetsova (UZB)	96	98	97	93	97	96	577	
24	Nor Dalilah Abu Bakar (MAS)	95	96	98	97	97	94	577	
25	Đàm Thị Nga (VIE)	97	96	94	96	97	96	576	
26	Thẩm Thúy Hồng (VIE)	98	97	95	93	98	95	576	
27	Devika Ranasinghe (SRI)	96	94	96	99	97	94	576	
28	Seiko Iwata (JPN)	99	94	94	96	96	96	575	
29	Priyanthi Kumari (SRI)	96	96	97	95	95	96	575	
30	Chuluunbadrakhyn Narantuyaa (MGL)	97	93	99	97	93	96	575	
31	Aysha Suwaileh (BRN)	98	93	97	98	93	95	574	
32	Mariani Rafali (MAS)	97	97	96	96	95	93	574	
33	Damdinsürengiin Lkhamsüren (MGL)	96	95	93	96	95	98	573	
34	Sakina Mamedova (UZB)	91	96	98	97	95	95	572	
35	Yoko Minamoto (JPN)	99	97	95	94	93	94	572	
36	Ruqaya Al-Rowaiei (BRN)	95	96	98	96	90	95	570	
37	Elaheh Ahmadi (IRI)	94	95	91	95	93	97	565	
38	Maytha Al-Kubaisi (QAT)	96	93	93	91	94	94	561	
39	Yulia Kaleeva (KGZ)	91	94	92	93	93	94	557	
—	Cholpon Tumenbaeva (KGZ)							DNS	
