= Shooting at the 2006 Asian Games – Men's 50 metre rifle three positions =

Men's 50 metre rifle 3 positions at the 2006 Asian Games
- Venue: Lusail Shooting Range
- Dates: 7 December 2006
- Competitors: 45 from 18 nations

Medalists
gold medal	Zhang Fu	China
silver medal	Zhang Lei	China
bronze medal	Gagan Narang	India

The men's 50 metre rifle three positions competition at the 2006 Asian Games in Doha, Qatar was held on 7 December at the Lusail Shooting Range.

The men's 50 metre rifle three positions consists of the prone, standing and kneeling positions, fired in that order, with 3×40 shots for men.

The men's match has separate commands and times for each position, giving each shooter 45 minutes to complete the prone part, 75 minutes for the standing part, and 60 minutes for the kneeling part, including sighting shots for each part.

The top eight competitors reach the final, where the score zones are divided into tenths, giving up to 10.9 points for each shot. The men's final consists of ten shots from the standing position, with a time limit of 75 seconds per shot. The competition is won by the shooter who reaches the highest aggregate score (qualification + final, maximum 1309.0).

Zhang Fu of China won the gold medal with a new Asian Games record, his teammate Zhang Lei finished second and Gagan Narang of India won the bronze medal.

== Schedule ==
All times are Arabia Standard Time (UTC+03:00)

Date	Time	Event
Thursday, 7 December 2006	08:00	Qualification
Thursday, 7 December 2006	12:30	Final

== Records ==
Prior to this competition, the existing world, Asian and Games records were as follows.

Qualification
World Record	Rajmond Debevec (SLO)	1186	Munich, Germany	29 August 1992
Asian Record	Liu Gang (CHN)	1180	Munich, Germany	11 June 2005
Games Record	Igor Pirekeýew (TKM)	1175	Busan, South Korea	7 October 2002
Final
World Record	Rajmond Debevec (SLO)	1287.9	Munich, Germany	29 August 1992
Asian Record	Liu Zhiwei (CHN)	1272.7	Changwon, South Korea	6 July 2003
Games Record	Igor Pirekeýew (TKM)	1266.9	Busan, South Korea	7 October 2002

== Results ==
=== Qualification ===
Rank	Athlete	Prone				Standing				Kneeling				Total	Notes
Rank	Athlete	1	2	3	4	1	2	3	4	1	2	3	4	Total	Notes
1	Zhang Fu (CHN)	99	97	99	100	94	96	99	96	98	100	95	97	1170	
2	Igor Pirekeýew (TKM)	100	100	99	100	97	92	95	95	97	95	97	98	1165	
3	Zhang Lei (CHN)	99	99	97	98	98	96	98	96	99	92	96	97	1165	
4	Vyacheslav Skoromnov (UZB)	99	100	96	97	94	95	95	94	97	96	100	99	1162	
5	Gagan Narang (IND)	99	98	99	100	97	99	97	98	90	91	98	96	1162	
6	Liu Tianyou (CHN)	99	100	96	95	94	93	96	97	97	96	97	99	1159	
7	Vitaliy Dovgun (KAZ)	99	99	95	100	96	92	95	97	95	98	96	96	1158	
8	Lee Hyun-tae (KOR)	98	97	97	100	94	96	95	95	97	93	99	94	1155	
9	Sanjeev Rajput (IND)	97	98	100	100	91	96	98	92	94	93	97	98	1154	
10	Tevarit Majchacheep (THA)	96	100	99	97	93	91	93	92	99	99	98	97	1154	
11	Yuriy Melsitov (KAZ)	99	99	99	100	89	95	88	97	95	95	98	97	1151	
12	Tsedevdorjiin Mönkh-Erdene (MGL)	99	98	99	99	96	90	93	95	95	95	97	95	1151	
13	Yuriy Yurkov (KAZ)	99	98	96	96	94	95	92	97	94	95	96	96	1148	
14	Park Bong-duk (KOR)	98	99	99	96	93	94	92	94	98	97	97	91	1148	
15	Toshikazu Yamashita (JPN)	96	99	98	97	92	97	96	93	97	93	95	94	1147	
16	Ruslan Ismailov (KGZ)	99	96	97	96	95	92	93	94	95	90	98	96	1141	
17	Abdulla Al-Ahmad (QAT)	97	95	95	96	95	94	93	92	97	95	96	96	1141	
18	Imran Hassan Khan (IND)	99	97	96	95	94	97	94	93	94	95	93	93	1140	
19	Yuri Lomov (KGZ)	97	98	98	99	89	92	95	92	95	91	97	96	1139	
20	Tadashi Maki (JPN)	99	98	99	99	93	94	92	93	92	92	94	94	1139	
21	Siddique Umer (PAK)	98	98	99	98	92	93	93	93	92	92	98	93	1139	
22	Olzodyn Enkhsaikhan (MGL)	98	95	100	99	94	94	91	95	95	94	91	92	1138	
23	Nguyễn Tấn Nam (VIE)	97	99	99	98	90	94	91	90	92	96	94	97	1137	
24	Jeon Dong-ju (KOR)	96	97	99	94	96	93	94	93	93	94	94	93	1136	
25	Takayuki Matsumoto (JPN)	96	99	93	93	93	95	94	97	96	94	93	93	1136	
26	Varavut Majchacheep (THA)	100	99	99	95	95	92	95	95	91	92	92	91	1136	
27	Nergüin Enkhbaatar (MGL)	98	99	98	98	89	93	91	93	95	96	91	94	1135	
28	Mangala Samarakoon (SRI)	99	99	100	97	88	92	91	89	94	97	97	92	1135	
29	Tachir Ismailov (KGZ)	98	100	97	99	90	92	89	95	93	96	90	95	1134	
30	Vũ Khánh Hải (VIE)	99	98	98	96	93	87	93	89	94	93	96	95	1131	
31	Khalaf Al-Khatri (OMA)	98	98	98	97	90	91	94	92	91	95	93	94	1131	
32	Muhammad Mushtaq (PAK)	100	100	97	95	96	91	92	91	92	93	92	90	1129	
33	Mohd Hameleay Mutalib (MAS)	98	96	97	96	93	94	92	91	93	93	92	93	1128	
34	Dadallah Al-Bulushi (OMA)	96	97	98	98	91	89	86	85	98	96	96	95	1125	
35	Trần Văn Ngọc (VIE)	97	99	97	98	85	91	92	93	89	93	93	94	1121	
36	Khalid Al-Anazi (KSA)	95	98	94	98	94	90	94	95	90	90	92	91	1121	
37	Ayaz Tahir (PAK)	94	96	97	98	84	94	96	92	93	87	92	96	1119	
38	Komkrit Kongnamchok (THA)	97	99	99	97	84	90	94	91	90	93	93	90	1117	
39	Ali Al-Qahtani (QAT)	98	97	99	95	89	86	89	94	94	86	89	94	1110	
40	Salman Hasan Zaman (BRN)	96	100	97	97	86	83	90	86	93	93	93	93	1107	
41	Jamal Al-Sebbah (BRN)	97	97	95	96	89	84	89	88	95	93	92	92	1107	
42	Abdullah Al-Bogami (KSA)	97	95	95	94	96	86	87	89	92	92	94	89	1106	
43	Mohammed Al-Hanai (OMA)	98	97	94	96	91	86	87	91	91	93	88	92	1104	
44	Abdulaziz Al-Jabri (QAT)	96	94	96	97	97	81	86	89	91	93	91	92	1103	
45	Khalid Al-Zamil (KSA)	96	96	93	96	87	84	89	90	86	92	89	83	1081	

=== Final ===
Rank	Athlete	Qual.	Final											Total	S-off	Notes
Rank	Athlete	Qual.	1	2	3	4	5	6	7	8	9	10	Total	Total	S-off	Notes
1st place, gold medalist(s)	Zhang Fu (CHN)	1170	10.7	9.2	9.7	9.1	10.6	8.9	10.2	10.2	9.6	9.8	98.0	1268.0		GR
2nd place, silver medalist(s)	Zhang Lei (CHN)	1165	10.7	9.8	9.8	10.6	10.9	10.0	10.1	10.2	9.5	10.2	101.8	1266.8		
3rd place, bronze medalist(s)	Gagan Narang (IND)	1162	9.3	10.5	9.8	9.8	10.4	9.3	10.1	9.4	10.7	10.6	99.9	1261.9		
4	Igor Pirekeýew (TKM)	1165	8.2	10.1	10.0	10.2	10.1	10.1	8.0	10.5	10.1	8.7	96.0	1261.0		
5	Liu Tianyou (CHN)	1159	10.2	10.6	10.6	9.6	9.5	10.7	9.2	9.5	10.7	10.5	101.1	1260.1		
6	Vitaliy Dovgun (KAZ)	1158	9.6	9.1	10.9	10.0	10.4	9.9	8.0	9.8	10.2	10.3	98.2	1256.2		
7	Vyacheslav Skoromnov (UZB)	1162	9.0	9.1	9.6	10.4	9.8	9.9	9.3	9.0	8.1	9.1	93.3	1255.3		
8	Lee Hyun-tae (KOR)	1155	10.2	9.2	8.0	10.2	9.8	10.1	10.1	10.3	9.9	9.7	97.5	1252.5		
