= Shooting at the 2006 Asian Games – Men's double trap team =

Men's double trap at the 2006 Asian Games
- Venue: Lusail Shooting Range
- Dates: 5 December 2006
- Competitors: 24 from 8 nations

Medalists
gold medal	China; Hu Binyuan, Liu Anlong, Wang Nan
silver medal	India; Vikram Bhatnagar, Rajyavardhan Singh Rathore, Ronjan Sodhi
bronze medal	Chinese Taipei; Chang Chien Ming-shan, Chen Shih-wei, Shih Wei-tin

The men's double trap team competition at the 2006 Asian Games in Doha, Qatar was held on 5 December at the Lusail Shooting Range.

== Schedule ==
All times are Arabia Standard Time (UTC+03:00)

Date	Time	Event
Tuesday, 5 December 2006	08:30	Final

== Records ==
Prior to this competition, the existing world, Asian and Games records were as follows.

World Record	Italy	429	Nicosia, Cyprus	11 June 1998
Asian Record	China	420	Hiroshima, Japan	10 October 1994
Games Record	China	418	Busan, South Korea	5 October 2002

== Results ==
Legend

- DNS — Did not start

Rank	Team	Round			Total	Notes
Rank	Team	1	2	3	Total	Notes
1st place, gold medalist(s)	China (CHN)	141	140	143	424	AR
	Hu Binyuan	49	46	48	143	
	Liu Anlong	44	46	47	137	
	Wang Nan	48	48	48	144	
2nd place, silver medalist(s)	India (IND)	138	133	138	409	
	Vikram Bhatnagar	47	43	44	134	
	Rajyavardhan Singh Rathore	46	43	50	139	
	Ronjan Sodhi	45	47	44	136	
3rd place, bronze medalist(s)	Chinese Taipei (TPE)	132	135	130	397	
	Chang Chien Ming-shan	45	44	43	132	
	Chen Shih-wei	43	46	43	132	
	Shih Wei-tin	44	45	44	133	
4	United Arab Emirates (UAE)	134	124	134	392	
	Saif Al-Shamsi	46	45	48	139	
	Ahmed Dhahi	43	39	44	126	
	Mohammed Dhahi	45	40	42	127	
5	Qatar (QAT)	127	135	128	390	
	Rashid Hamad Al-Athba	46	48	44	138	
	Hamad Al-Marri	41	40	41	122	
	Abdulbaset Mohsin	40	47	43	130	
6	South Korea (KOR)	130	120	134	384	
	Jung Yoon-kyun	41	40	47	128	
	Kim Byoung-jun	45	45	45	135	
	Song Nam-jun	44	35	42	121	
7	Kuwait (KUW)	133	129	119	381	
	Hamad Al-Afasi	43	45	35	123	
	Rashed Al-Manee	43	40	39	122	
	Mashfi Al-Mutairi	47	44	45	136	
—	Vietnam (VIE)				DNS	
	Dương Anh Trung				DNS	
	Lê Nghĩa	34	33	39	106	
	Nguyễn Hoàng Điệp	37	41	33	111	
