= Shooting at the 2006 Asian Games – Men's double trap =

Men's double trap at the 2006 Asian Games
- Venue: Lusail Shooting Range
- Dates: 5 December 2006
- Competitors: 28 from 11 nations

Medalists
gold medal	Wang Nan	China
silver medal	Hu Binyuan	China
bronze medal	Rajyavardhan Singh Rathore	India

The men's double trap competition at the 2006 Asian Games in Doha, Qatar was held on 5 December at the Lusail Shooting Range.

== Schedule ==
All times are Arabia Standard Time (UTC+03:00)

Date	Time	Event
Tuesday, 5 December 2006	08:30	Qualification
Tuesday, 5 December 2006	15:00	Final

== Records ==
Prior to this competition, the existing world, Asian and Games records were as follows.

Qualification
World Record	Michael Diamond (AUS)	147	Barcelona, Spain	19 July 1998
Asian Record	Fehaid Al-Deehani (KUW)	145	Hiroshima, Japan	10 October 1994
Games Record	Fehaid Al-Deehani (KUW)	145	Hiroshima, Japan	10 October 1994
Final
World Record	Daniele Di Spigno (ITA)	194	Tampere, Finland	7 July 1999
Asian Record	Li Shuangchun (CHN)	193	Lonato, Italy	22 October 2002
Games Record	Fehaid Al-Deehani (KUW)	187	Hiroshima, Japan	10 October 1994

== Results ==
Legend

- DNS — Did not start

=== Qualification ===
Rank	Athlete	Round			Total	S-off	Notes
Rank	Athlete	1	2	3	Total	S-off	Notes
1	Wang Nan (CHN)	48	48	48	144		
2	Hu Binyuan (CHN)	49	46	48	143		
3	Rajyavardhan Singh Rathore (IND)	46	43	50	139		
4	Saif Al-Shamsi (UAE)	46	45	48	139		
5	Rashid Hamad Al-Athba (QAT)	46	48	44	138		
6	Liu Anlong (CHN)	44	46	47	137		
7	Mashfi Al-Mutairi (KUW)	47	44	45	136		
8	Ronjan Sodhi (IND)	45	47	44	136		
9	Kim Byoung-jun (KOR)	45	45	45	135		
10	Vikram Bhatnagar (IND)	47	43	44	134		
11	Shih Wei-tin (TPE)	44	45	44	133		
12	Chen Shih-wei (TPE)	43	46	43	132		
13	Chang Chien Ming-shan (TPE)	45	44	43	132		
14	Abdulbaset Mohsin (QAT)	40	47	43	130		
15	Jung Yoon-kyun (KOR)	41	40	47	128		
16	Mohammed Dhahi (UAE)	45	40	42	127		
17	Ahmed Dhahi (UAE)	43	39	44	126		
18	Hamad Al-Afasi (KUW)	43	45	35	123		
19	Hamad Al-Marri (QAT)	41	40	41	122		
20	Rashed Al-Manee (KUW)	43	40	39	122		
21	Song Nam-jun (KOR)	44	35	42	121		
22	Francois Stephan (LIB)	36	38	39	113		
23	Saleem Al-Nasri (OMA)	38	36	38	112		
24	Nguyễn Hoàng Điệp (VIE)	37	41	33	111		
25	Mohammed Al-Habsi (OMA)	37	37	36	110		
26	Lê Nghĩa (VIE)	34	33	39	106		
27	Ivan Karpenko (KAZ)	33	35	34	102		
—	Dương Anh Trung (VIE)				DNS		

=== Final ===
Rank	Athlete	Qual.	Final	Total	S-off	Notes
1st place, gold medalist(s)	Wang Nan (CHN)	144	45	189		GR
2nd place, silver medalist(s)	Hu Binyuan (CHN)	143	45	188		
3rd place, bronze medalist(s)	Rajyavardhan Singh Rathore (IND)	139	46	185		
4	Saif Al-Shamsi (UAE)	139	45	184		
5	Rashid Hamad Al-Athba (QAT)	138	42	180		
6	Liu Anlong (CHN)	137	41	178		
