= Shooting at the 2006 Asian Games – Women's 10 metre air pistol team =

Women's 10 metre air pistol team at the 2006 Asian Games
- Venue: Lusail Shooting Range
- Dates: 3 December 2006
- Competitors: 51 from 17 nations

Medalists
gold medal	China; Chen Ying, Guo Wenjun, Tao Luna
silver medal	India; Shweta Chaudhary, Sonia Rai, Harveen Srao
bronze medal	South Korea; Boo Soon-hee, Kim Byung-hee, Lee Ho-lim

The women's 10 metre air pistol team competition at the 2006 Asian Games in Doha, Qatar was held on 3 December at the Lusail Shooting Range.

== Schedule ==
All times are Arabia Standard Time (UTC+03:00)

Date	Time	Event
Sunday, 3 December 2006	10:15	Final

== Records ==
Prior to this competition, the existing world, Asian and Games records were as follows.

World Record	Russia	1161	Brno, Czech Republic	5 August 1993
Asian Record	China	1156	Busan, South Korea	3 October 2002
Games Record	China	1156	Busan, South Korea	3 October 2002

== Results ==
Rank	Team	Series				Total	Notes
Rank	Team	1	2	3	4	Total	Notes
1st place, gold medalist(s)	China (CHN)	292	288	290	291	1161	AR
	Chen Ying	97	94	94	96	381	
	Guo Wenjun	98	96	98	97	389	
	Tao Luna	97	98	98	98	391	
2nd place, silver medalist(s)	India (IND)	287	289	282	284	1142	
	Shweta Chaudhary	94	98	94	92	378	
	Sonia Rai	98	93	94	96	381	
	Harveen Srao	95	98	94	96	383	
3rd place, bronze medalist(s)	South Korea (KOR)	285	288	283	284	1140	
	Boo Soon-hee	95	94	91	93	373	
	Kim Byung-hee	96	97	98	95	386	
	Lee Ho-lim	94	97	94	96	381	
4	North Korea (PRK)	281	290	283	283	1137	
	Kang Un-byol	92	97	95	95	379	
	Pak Sol-hwa	93	97	93	95	378	
	Ri Hyang-sun	96	96	95	93	380	
5	Chinese Taipei (TPE)	281	280	295	279	1135	
	Huang Yi-ling	94	94	99	93	380	
	Ma Yu-mei	93	93	98	94	378	
	Tsai Chia-hui	94	93	98	92	377	
6	Mongolia (MGL)	278	285	280	286	1129	
	Otryadyn Gündegmaa	93	97	95	96	381	
	Gantömöriin Kherlentsetseg	89	93	88	93	363	
	Tsogbadrakhyn Mönkhzul	96	95	97	97	385	
7	Thailand (THA)	280	282	281	284	1127	
	Chanyanuch Kobkuntnachai	94	95	94	94	377	
	Tanyaporn Prucksakorn	92	96	94	96	378	
	Wanwarin Yusawat	94	91	93	94	372	
8	Malaysia (MAS)	277	286	284	277	1124	
	Siti Nur Masitah Badrin	91	95	95	93	374	
	Joseline Cheah	93	96	94	94	377	
	Bibiana Ng	93	95	95	90	373	
9	Kazakhstan (KAZ)	283	284	282	273	1122	
	Zauresh Baibussinova	93	94	97	92	376	
	Assel Berkina	94	97	93	90	374	
	Yuliya Bondareva	96	93	92	91	372	
10	Japan (JPN)	277	281	281	282	1121	
	Michiko Fukushima	92	95	93	94	374	
	Yoko Inada	92	95	95	92	374	
	Yukari Konishi	93	91	93	96	373	
11	Vietnam (VIE)	276	274	284	286	1120	
	Đặng Lê Ngọc Mai	93	92	94	98	377	
	Nguyễn Thu Vân	91	94	91	96	372	
	Phạm Thị Hà	92	88	99	92	371	
12	Iran (IRI)	276	274	282	285	1117	
	Shokoufeh Akasheh	92	88	92	97	369	
	Nasim Hassanpour	95	94	97	93	379	
	Marzieh Mehrabi	89	92	93	95	369	
13	Hong Kong (HKG)	271	280	278	279	1108	
	Chan Lai Ping	91	93	89	92	365	
	Ip Pui Yi	89	91	95	94	369	
	Lo Ka Kay	91	96	94	93	374	
14	Kyrgyzstan (KGZ)	276	270	270	273	1089	
	Meri Ismailova	89	88	88	95	360	
	Elena Travas	92	85	89	87	353	
	Zabida Yrsalieva	95	97	93	91	376	
15	Macau (MAC)	267	263	267	271	1068	
	Chan Pou Pou	90	91	92	93	366	
	Iun Hang I	91	87	91	89	358	
	Vong Iok In	86	85	84	89	344	
16	Qatar (QAT)	261	266	261	268	1056	
	Souad Al-Jattal	82	84	81	90	337	
	Souad Al-Khater	90	94	91	91	366	
	Hanadi Salem	89	88	89	87	353	
17	Bahrain (BRN)	269	265	266	253	1053	
	Noora Ajoor	88	82	85	76	331	
	Fatima Al-Haddad	94	91	90	87	362	
	Naheed Mohamed	87	92	91	90	360	
