= Shooting at the 2006 Asian Games – Men's 50 metre rifle prone team =

Men's 50 metre rifle prone team at the 2006 Asian Games
- Venue: Lusail Shooting Range
- Dates: 3 December 2006
- Competitors: 42 from 14 nations

Medalists
gold medal	Kazakhstan; Sergey Belyayev, Vitaliy Dovgun, Yuriy Melsitov
silver medal	South Korea; Jeon Dong-ju, Lee Hyun-tae, Park Bong-duk
bronze medal	China; Liu Gang, Zhang Fu, Zhang Lei

The men's 50 metre rifle prone team competition at the 2006 Asian Games in Doha, Qatar was held on 3 December at the Lusail Shooting Range.

== Schedule ==
All times are Arabia Standard Time (UTC+03:00)

Date	Time	Event
Sunday, 3 December 2006	08:00	Final

== Records ==
Prior to this competition, the existing world, Asian and Games records were as follows.

World Record	Austria	1793	Plzeň, Czech Republic	19 July 2003
Asian Record	China	1782	Busan, South Korea	5 October 2002
Games Record	China	1782	Busan, South Korea	5 October 2002

== Results ==
Rank	Team	Series						Total	Notes
Rank	Team	1	2	3	4	5	6	Total	Notes
1st place, gold medalist(s)	Kazakhstan (KAZ)	293	295	295	292	293	294	1762	
	Sergey Belyayev	100	98	97	99	99	100	593	
	Vitaliy Dovgun	97	98	98	98	95	97	583	
	Yuriy Melsitov	96	99	100	95	99	97	586	
2nd place, silver medalist(s)	South Korea (KOR)	294	293	290	292	294	295	1758	
	Jeon Dong-ju	97	95	94	95	98	98	577	
	Lee Hyun-tae	99	98	99	99	100	98	593	
	Park Bong-duk	98	100	97	98	96	99	588	
3rd place, bronze medalist(s)	China (CHN)	292	293	291	291	292	293	1752	
	Liu Gang	98	98	98	98	98	99	589	
	Zhang Fu	98	99	97	97	96	99	586	
	Zhang Lei	96	96	96	96	98	95	577	
4	Japan (JPN)	292	293	293	290	287	293	1748	
	Tadashi Maki	95	97	98	97	95	96	578	
	Takayuki Matsumoto	98	97	97	95	94	98	579	
	Toshikazu Yamashita	99	99	98	98	98	99	591	
5	Mongolia (MGL)	289	293	292	292	293	287	1746	
	Olzodyn Enkhsaikhan	98	97	99	99	97	96	586	
	Tsedevdorjiin Mönkh-Erdene	97	96	97	96	97	94	577	
	Bayaryn Sain-Er	94	100	96	97	99	97	583	
6	Vietnam (VIE)	291	298	288	288	291	289	1745	
	Nguyễn Tấn Nam	95	98	98	93	97	97	578	
	Trần Văn Ngọc	98	100	95	97	99	97	586	
	Vũ Khánh Hải	98	100	95	98	95	95	581	
7	Thailand (THA)	291	288	293	290	290	291	1743	
	Komkrit Kongnamchok	95	94	97	94	95	93	568	
	Tevarit Majchacheep	99	97	98	98	100	99	591	
	Suphakorn Wisetchai	97	97	98	98	95	99	584	
8	Oman (OMA)	288	288	289	291	292	290	1738	
	Dadallah Al-Bulushi	95	93	94	98	96	95	571	
	Khalaf Al-Khatri	96	96	100	95	99	98	584	
	Sinan Al-Nasri	97	99	95	98	97	97	583	
9	Pakistan (PAK)	289	288	286	288	291	291	1733	
	Muhammad Mushtaq	94	98	96	96	97	99	580	
	Ayaz Tahir	98	95	97	98	99	97	584	
	Siddique Umer	97	95	93	94	95	95	569	
10	India (IND)	290	293	287	287	285	290	1732	
	Sushil Ghalay	94	99	97	97	94	97	578	
	Imran Hassan Khan	97	99	94	94	96	96	576	
	Surendra Singh Rathod	99	95	96	96	95	97	578	
11	Qatar (QAT)	288	289	285	294	284	288	1728	
	Abdulla Al-Ahmad	94	98	95	96	95	93	571	
	Ali Al-Qahtani	95	95	96	99	95	99	579	
	Abdulnasser Al-Shaiba	99	96	94	99	94	96	578	
12	Kyrgyzstan (KGZ)	292	286	287	282	289	287	1723	
	Ruslan Ismailov	96	93	95	92	94	96	566	
	Tachir Ismailov	99	95	94	94	97	97	576	
	Yuri Lomov	97	98	98	96	98	94	581	
13	Saudi Arabia (KSA)	292	281	287	288	290	284	1722	
	Khalid Al-Anazi	97	95	98	96	97	95	578	
	Abdullah Al-Bogami	98	96	96	95	96	94	575	
	Khalid Al-Zamil	97	90	93	97	97	95	569	
14	Maldives (MDV)	272	277	277	277	271	277	1651	
	Mohamed Abdulla	88	91	89	90	84	86	528	
	Ismail Mahdi	89	92	93	94	95	95	558	
	Ahmed Mumthaz	95	94	95	93	92	96	565	
