= Husayn ibn Ali (disambiguation) =

Husayn ibn Ali (Arabic: حسين بن علي) is the name of:

- Husayn ibn Ali, (625–680), the grandson of the Islamic prophet Muhammad, and the son of Ali, who can be regarded as the most famous one with this name.
- al-Husayn ibn Ali al-Abid (d. 786), leader of an anti-Abbasid rebellion, killed at the Battle of Fakhkh
- Hussein bin Ali, Sharif of Mecca (1853/1854–1931), was Sharif and Emir of Mecca from 1908 and King of the Hejaz from 1916 to 1924
- Al-Husayn I ibn Ali (1669–1740), the founder of the Husainid Dynasty, which ruled Tunisia until 1957.

== See also ==
- Mohammad Imam Hossain, Bangladeshi sport shooter
- al-Husayn (missile), Iraqi ballsitic missile
- Hussein
