= Shooting at the 2006 Asian Games – Men's 10 metre running target mixed =

Men's 10 metre running target mixed at the 2006 Asian Games
- Venue: Lusail Shooting Range
- Dates: 6 December 2006
- Competitors: 13 from 5 nations

Medalists
gold medal	Gan Lin	China
silver medal	Bakhtiyar Ibrayev	Kazakhstan
bronze medal	Andrey Gurov	Kazakhstan

The men's 10 metre running target mixed competition at the 2006 Asian Games in Doha, Qatar was held on 6 December at the Lusail Shooting Range.

== Schedule ==
All times are Arabia Standard Time (UTC+03:00)

Date	Time	Event
Wednesday, 6 December 2006	08:00	Final

== Records ==
Prior to this competition, the existing world, Asian and Games records were as follows.

World Record	Manfred Kurzer (GER)	391	Pontevedra, Spain	14 March 2001
Asian Record	Niu Zhiyuan (CHN)	390	Barcelona, Spain	20 July 1998
Games Record	—	—	—	—

== Results ==
Rank	Athlete	Stage 1		Stage 2		Total	S-off	Notes
Rank	Athlete	1	2	1	2	Total	S-off	Notes
1st place, gold medalist(s)	Gan Lin (CHN)	97	98	96	98	389		GR
2nd place, silver medalist(s)	Bakhtiyar Ibrayev (KAZ)	98	95	92	95	380		
3rd place, bronze medalist(s)	Andrey Gurov (KAZ)	95	90	95	96	376		
4	Rassim Mologly (KAZ)	96	95	92	91	374		
5	Khalid Al-Kuwari (QAT)	89	93	91	97	370		
6	Mohammed Amin Sobhi (QAT)	92	90	94	94	370		
7	Jeong You-jin (KOR)	95	91	95	88	369		
8	Mohammed Abouteama (QAT)	89	93	92	93	367		
9	Trần Hoàng Vũ (VIE)	90	94	94	88	366		
10	Cho Se-jong (KOR)	92	90	86	96	364		
11	Nguyễn Mạnh Cường (VIE)	89	90	94	90	363		
12	Nguyễn Văn Tùng (VIE)	90	91	88	92	361		
13	Hwang Young-do (KOR)	84	89	86	93	352		
