= Shooting at the 2006 Asian Games – Women's double trap team =

Women's double trap team at the 2006 Asian Games
- Venue: Lusail Shooting Range
- Dates: 5 December 2006
- Competitors: 18 from 6 nations

Medalists
gold medal	South Korea; Kim Mi-jin, Lee Bo-na, Son Hye-kyoung
silver medal	China; Wang Yujin, Zhang Yafei, Zhu Mei
bronze medal	Thailand; Punnapa Asvanit, Supornpan Chewchalermmit, Janejira Srisongkram

The women's double trap team competition at the 2006 Asian Games in Doha, Qatar was held on 5 December at the Lusail Shooting Range.

== Schedule ==
All times are Arabia Standard Time (UTC+03:00)

Date	Time	Event
Tuesday, 5 December 2006	08:30	Final

== Records ==
Prior to this competition, the existing world, Asian and Games records were as follows.

World Record	China	328	Cairo, Egypt	4 May 2001
Asian Record	China	328	Cairo, Egypt	4 May 2001
Games Record	China	325	Busan, South Korea	5 October 2002

== Results ==
Rank	Team	Round			Total	Notes
Rank	Team	1	2	3	Total	Notes
1st place, gold medalist(s)	South Korea (KOR)	104	106	93	303	
	Kim Mi-jin	34	36	27	97	
	Lee Bo-na	36	33	32	101	
	Son Hye-kyoung	34	37	34	105	
2nd place, silver medalist(s)	China (CHN)	101	93	94	288	
	Wang Yujin	34	31	31	96	
	Zhang Yafei	32	33	33	98	
	Zhu Mei	35	29	30	94	
3rd place, bronze medalist(s)	Thailand (THA)	97	88	90	275	
	Punnapa Asvanit	28	28	31	87	
	Supornpan Chewchalermmit	30	27	28	85	
	Janejira Srisongkram	39	33	31	103	
4	Kazakhstan (KAZ)	80	75	67	222	
	Anastassiya Davydova	30	26	22	78	
	Mariya Dmitriyenko	25	26	20	71	
	Yelena Struchayeva	25	23	25	73	
5	Vietnam (VIE)	68	64	57	189	
	Hoàng Thị Tuất	27	28	26	81	
	Nguyễn Thị Tuyết Mai	18	21	16	55	
	Nguyễn Thùy Dương	23	15	15	53	
6	Qatar (QAT)	59	48	42	149	
	Amna Al-Abdulla	18	12	8	38	
	Noora Al-Ali	25	17	21	63	
	Hanaa Hassan	16	19	13	48	
