= Taekwondo at the 2006 Asian Games – Women's 67 kg =

Taekwondo competition

Women's 67 kg at the 2006 Asian Games
- Venue: Qatar SC Indoor Hall
- Date: 8 December 2006
- Competitors: 7 from 7 nations

Medalists
gold medal	Hwang Kyung-seon	South Korea
silver medal	Toni Rivero	Philippines
bronze medal	Bùi Thu Hiền	Vietnam
bronze medal	Jiang Lingling	China

The women's welterweight (−67 kilograms) event at the 2006 Asian Games took place on 8 December 2006 at Qatar SC Indoor Hall, Doha, Qatar.

== Schedule ==
All times are Arabia Standard Time (UTC+03:00)

Date	Time	Event
Friday, 8 December 2006	14:00	Quarterfinals
Friday, 8 December 2006	14:00	Semifinals
Friday, 8 December 2006	14:00	Final

== Results ==
Quarterfinals		Semifinals		Final
		Bùi Thu Hiền (VIE)	−1
Liya Nurkina (KAZ)	1	Toni Rivero (PHI)	2
Toni Rivero (PHI)	2			Toni Rivero (PHI)	1
Sandra El-Chami (LIB)	0			Hwang Kyung-seon (KOR)	6
Jiang Lingling (CHN)	7	Jiang Lingling (CHN)	0
Hwang Kyung-seon (KOR)	7	Hwang Kyung-seon (KOR)	4
Rasha Al-Sadaga (JOR)	0
