= Shooting at the 2006 Asian Games – Women's 10 metre running target =

Women's 10 metre running target at the 2006 Asian Games
- Venue: Lusail Shooting Range
- Dates: 4 December 2006
- Competitors: 10 from 4 nations

Medalists
gold medal	Xu Xuan	China
silver medal	Natalya Gurova	Kazakhstan
bronze medal	Đặng Hồng Hà	Vietnam

The women's 10 metre running target competition at the 2006 Asian Games in Doha, Qatar was held on 4 December at the Lusail Shooting Range.

== Schedule ==
All times are Arabia Standard Time (UTC+03:00)

Date	Time	Event
Monday, 4 December 2006	08:00	Slow
Monday, 4 December 2006	09:30	Fast

== Records ==
Prior to this competition, the existing world, Asian and Games records were as follows.

World Record	Xu Xuan (CHN)	391	Lahti, Finland	6 July 2002
Asian Record	Xu Xuan (CHN)	391	Lahti, Finland	6 July 2002
Games Record	Xu Xuan (CHN)	389	Busan, South Korea	6 October 2002

== Results ==
Rank	Athlete	Slow		Fast		Total	S-off	Notes
Rank	Athlete	1	2	1	2	Total	S-off	Notes
1st place, gold medalist(s)	Xu Xuan (CHN)	98	96	94	98	386		
2nd place, silver medalist(s)	Natalya Gurova (KAZ)	96	95	93	87	371		
3rd place, bronze medalist(s)	Đặng Hồng Hà (VIE)	95	95	93	85	368		
4	Anna Pushkaryova (KAZ)	97	94	85	89	365		
5	Nguyễn Thị Thu Hằng (VIE)	95	81	86	90	352		
6	Yuliya Berner (KAZ)	85	89	87	86	347		
7	Đỗ Thu Trà (VIE)	87	89	78	90	344		
8	Amal Mohammed (QAT)	88	83	85	84	340		
9	Anisa Saleh Juma (QAT)	77	75	78	71	301		
10	Samsam Saleh Juma (QAT)	68	73	60	70	271		
