= Shooting at the 2006 Asian Games – Men's 10 metre running target team =

Men's 10 metre running target team at the 2006 Asian Games
- Venue: Lusail Shooting Range
- Dates: 5 December 2006
- Competitors: 12 from 4 nations

Medalists
gold medal	Kazakhstan; Andrey Gurov, Bakhtiyar Ibrayev, Rassim Mologly
silver medal	South Korea; Cho Se-jong, Hwang Young-do, Jeong You-jin
bronze medal	Qatar; Mohammed Abouteama, Khalid Al-Kuwari, Mohammed Amin Sobhi

The men's 10 metre running target team competition at the 2006 Asian Games in Doha, Qatar was held on 5 December at the Lusail Shooting Range.

== Schedule ==
All times are Arabia Standard Time (UTC+03:00)

Date	Time	Event
Tuesday, 5 December 2006	08:00	Slow
Tuesday, 5 December 2006	10:30	Fast

== Records ==
Prior to this competition, the existing world, Asian and Games records were as follows.

World Record	Germany	1733	Lahti, Finland	5 July 2002
Asian Record	China	1734	Kuala Lumpur, Malaysia	16 February 2004
Games Record	China	1720	Busan, South Korea	4 October 2002

== Results ==
Rank	Team	Slow			Fast			Total	Notes
Rank	Team	1	2	3	1	2	3	Total	Notes
1st place, gold medalist(s)	Kazakhstan (KAZ)	287	276	287	284	280	279	1693	
	Andrey Gurov	95	93	94	95	93	92	562	
	Bakhtiyar Ibrayev	95	88	97	96	92	96	564	
	Rassim Mologly	97	95	96	93	95	91	567	
2nd place, silver medalist(s)	South Korea (KOR)	284	282	285	274	273	281	1679	
	Cho Se-jong	97	99	93	88	89	97	563	
	Hwang Young-do	94	92	99	93	87	91	556	
	Jeong You-jin	93	91	93	93	97	93	560	
3rd place, bronze medalist(s)	Qatar (QAT)	275	282	284	272	278	275	1666	
	Mohammed Abouteama	91	92	96	87	94	93	553	
	Khalid Al-Kuwari	90	94	93	95	89	87	548	
	Mohammed Amin Sobhi	94	96	95	90	95	95	565	
4	Vietnam (VIE)	282	276	263	257	278	267	1623	
	Nguyễn Mạnh Cường	93	91	88	87	95	86	540	
	Nguyễn Văn Tùng	97	94	88	86	87	88	540	
	Trần Hoàng Vũ	92	91	87	84	96	93	543	
