= Shooting at the 2002 Asian Games – Women's 10 metre running target team =

Women's 10 metre running target team at the 2002 Asian Games
- Venue: Changwon International Shooting Range
- Dates: 6 October 2002
- Competitors: 9 from 3 nations

Medalists
gold medal	China; Qiu Wei, Wang Xia, Xu Xuan
silver medal	South Korea; Kim Deuk-nam, Kim Moon-sun, Park Jung-yun
bronze medal	Iran; Lida Fariman, Elham Hashemi, Raheleh Kheirollahzadeh

The women's 10 metre running target team competition at the 2002 Asian Games in Busan, South Korea was held on 6 October at the Changwon International Shooting Range.

== Schedule ==
All times are Korea Standard Time (UTC+09:00)

Date	Time	Event
Sunday, 6 October 2002	09:00	Final

== Records ==
Prior to this competition, the existing world, Asian and Games records were as follows.

World Record	China	1150	Lahti, Finland	6 July 2002
Asian Record	China	1150	Lahti, Finland	6 July 2002
Games Record	—	—	—	—

== Results ==
Rank	Team	Slow		Fast		Total	Notes
Rank	Team	1	2	1	2	Total	Notes
1st place, gold medalist(s)	China (CHN)	292	284	277	288	1141	GR
	Qiu Wei	97	92	89	95	373	
	Wang Xia	96	95	90	98	379	
	Xu Xuan	99	97	98	95	389	
2nd place, silver medalist(s)	South Korea (KOR)	284	276	270	277	1107	
	Kim Deuk-nam	94	94	89	93	370	
	Kim Moon-sun	92	92	97	88	369	
	Park Jung-yun	98	90	84	96	368	
3rd place, bronze medalist(s)	Iran (IRI)	130	118	47	63	358	
	Lida Fariman	53	63	15	28	159	
	Elham Hashemi	35	15	17	29	96	
	Raheleh Kheirollahzadeh	42	40	15	6	103	
