= Wang Nan (sport shooter) =

Chinese sport shooter (born 1978)

Medal record

Men's shooting

Representing China

Asian Championships
Gold medal – first place	2007 Kuwait City	Double trap team

Wang Nan (Chinese: 王楠; pinyin: Wáng Nán; born 22 July 1978 in Zhengzhou, Henan) is a male Chinese sports shooter.

At the 2008 Olympic Games he finished in twelfth place in the double trap qualification, missing a place among the top six, who progressed to the final round.

He also finished second at the 2005 World Championships and first at the 2006 Asian Games.

He belongs to the Henan Provincial Shooting and Archery Administrative Center.
