= Ronak Pandit =

Indian sport shooter (born 1985)

Personal information
- Citizenship: Indian
- Born: 12 April 1985 (age 41)
- Occupation: Sport shooter
- Spouse: Heena Sidhu (m. 2013)
Medal record
Representing India
Men's shooting
Commonwealth Games
Gold medal – first place	2006 Melbourne	Men's 25m Standard Pistol (Pairs)

Ronak Pandit (12 April 1985) is an Indian sport shooter. He won gold medal in the Men's 25m Standard Pistol (Pairs) with Samaresh Jung at the 2006 Commonwealth Games. He is married to Indian shooter Heena Sidhu and has a daughter named Reyah. He is also the coach of Indian pistol team preparing for Tokyo Olympics.
