= Harveen Srao =

Indian sport shooter

Personal information
- Nationality: Indian
- Born: 1986 (age 39–40)

Sport
- Country: India
- Sport: Shooting
Medal record
Women's shooting
Representing India
Asian Games
Silver medal – second place	2006 Doha	10 metre air pistol team
Summer Universiade
Gold medal – first place	2011 Shenzhen	10 metre air pistol
Gold medal – first place	2011 Shenzhen	10 metre air pistol team

Harveen Srao (born 1986) is an Indian sport shooter. She won a silver medal in the Women's 10 metre air pistol team in the 2006 Doha Asian Games.
