= Shooting at the 2006 Asian Games – Women's 10 metre running target team =

Women's 10 metre running target team at the 2006 Asian Games
- Venue: Lusail Shooting Range
- Dates: 4 December 2006
- Competitors: 9 from 3 nations

Medalists
gold medal	Kazakhstan; Yuliya Berner, Natalya Gurova, Anna Pushkaryova
silver medal	Vietnam; Đặng Hồng Hà, Đỗ Thu Trà, Nguyễn Thị Thu Hằng
bronze medal	Qatar; Anisa Saleh Juma, Samsam Saleh Juma, Amal Mohammed

The women's 10 metre running target team competition at the 2006 Asian Games in Doha, Qatar was held on 4 December at the Lusail Shooting Range.

== Schedule ==
All times are Arabia Standard Time (UTC+03:00)

Date	Time	Event
Monday, 4 December 2006	08:00	Slow
Monday, 4 December 2006	09:30	Fast

== Records ==
Prior to this competition, the existing world, Asian and Games records were as follows.

World Record	China	1150	Lahti, Finland	6 July 2002
Asian Record	China	1150	Lahti, Finland	6 July 2002
Games Record	China	1141	Busan, South Korea	6 October 2002

== Results ==
Rank	Team	Slow		Fast		Total	Notes
Rank	Team	1	2	1	2	Total	Notes
1st place, gold medalist(s)	Kazakhstan (KAZ)	278	278	265	262	1083	
	Yuliya Berner	85	89	87	86	347	
	Natalya Gurova	96	95	93	87	371	
	Anna Pushkaryova	97	94	85	89	365	
2nd place, silver medalist(s)	Vietnam (VIE)	277	265	257	265	1064	
	Đặng Hồng Hà	95	95	93	85	368	
	Đỗ Thu Trà	87	89	78	90	344	
	Nguyễn Thị Thu Hằng	95	81	86	90	352	
3rd place, bronze medalist(s)	Qatar (QAT)	233	231	223	225	912	
	Anisa Saleh Juma	77	75	78	71	301	
	Samsam Saleh Juma	68	73	60	70	271	
	Amal Mohammed	88	83	85	84	340	
