= Shooting at the 2006 Asian Games – Men's 10 metre running target mixed team =

Men's 10 metre running target mixed team at the 2006 Asian Games
- Venue: Lusail Shooting Range
- Dates: 6 December 2006
- Competitors: 12 from 4 nations

Medalists
gold medal	Kazakhstan; Andrey Gurov, Bakhtiyar Ibrayev, Rassim Mologly
silver medal	Qatar; Mohammed Abouteama, Khalid Al-Kuwari, Mohammed Amin Sobhi
bronze medal	Vietnam; Nguyễn Mạnh Cường, Nguyễn Văn Tùng, Trần Hoàng Vũ

The men's 10 metre running target mixed team competition at the 2006 Asian Games in Doha, Qatar was held on 6 December at the Lusail Shooting Range.

== Schedule ==
All times are Arabia Standard Time (UTC+03:00)

Date	Time	Event
Wednesday, 6 December 2006	08:00	Final

== Records ==
Prior to this competition, the existing world, Asian and Games records were as follows.

World Record	Russia	1158	Thessaloniki, Greece	22 March 2002
Asian Record	China	1145	Lahti, Finland	6 July 2002
Games Record	—	—	—	—

== Results ==
Rank	Team	Stage 1		Stage 2		Total	Notes
Rank	Team	1	2	1	2	Total	Notes
1st place, gold medalist(s)	Kazakhstan (KAZ)	289	280	279	282	1130	GR
	Andrey Gurov	95	90	95	96	376	
	Bakhtiyar Ibrayev	98	95	92	95	380	
	Rassim Mologly	96	95	92	91	374	
2nd place, silver medalist(s)	Qatar (QAT)	270	276	277	284	1107	
	Mohammed Abouteama	89	93	92	93	367	
	Khalid Al-Kuwari	89	93	91	97	370	
	Mohammed Amin Sobhi	92	90	94	94	370	
3rd place, bronze medalist(s)	Vietnam (VIE)	269	275	276	270	1090	
	Nguyễn Mạnh Cường	89	90	94	90	363	
	Nguyễn Văn Tùng	90	91	88	92	361	
	Trần Hoàng Vũ	90	94	94	88	366	
4	South Korea (KOR)	271	270	267	277	1085	
	Cho Se-jong	92	90	86	96	364	
	Hwang Young-do	84	89	86	93	352	
	Jeong You-jin	95	91	95	88	369	
