= Sonia Rai =

Indian sport shooter (born 1980)

Personal information
- Nationality: Indian
- Born: 13 November 1980 (age 44) Kangra, Himachal Pradesh, India

Sport
- Sport: Shooting
- Event: 10 m air pistol

Sonia Rai (born 13 November 1980) is an Indian sport shooter and coach, best known for her contributions in the 10 metre air pistol event. A multiple-time national champion and international medallist, she is presently associated with the Sports Authority of India as a national-level shooting coach.

== Early life ==
Sonia Rai was born in Kangra, Himachal Pradesh, India. Her interest in shooting emerged at an early age, and she began formal training in 1988. By 1990, she had entered competitive shooting, demonstrating a natural aptitude for precision and mental discipline—qualities that later defined her career.

== Shooting career ==
Rai represented India in several international competitions under the aegis of the International Shooting Sport Federation (ISSF). Her most notable achievements include:

- Winning a bronze medal at the 2006 ISSF World Cup in Resende, Brazil, in the women's 10 m air pistol event.
- Securing a silver medal in the team 10 m air pistol event at the 2010 Asian Games held in Guangzhou, China.

== Coaching career ==
After an illustrious competitive career, Rai transitioned into coaching to guide and mentor the next generation of Indian shooters. She joined the Sports Authority of India as a shooting coach, where she continues to contribute to the development of elite and junior pistol shooters.
