= Chae Keun-bae =

South Korean sport shooter (born 1970)

- Born: 20 June 1970 (age 55)
- Occupation: Sport shooter

Korean name
- Hangul: 채근배
- Hanja: 蔡根培
- RR: Chae Geunbae
- MR: Ch'ae Kŭnbae

Chae Keun-bae (born 20 June 1970) is a South Korean sport shooter who competed in the 1992 Summer Olympics.
