= Lee Hye-jin (sport shooter) =

South Korean sport shooter

Lee Hye-jin (born 16 November 1985) is a South Korean sport shooter who competed in the 2004 Summer Olympics.
