= Liu Anlong =

Chinese sport shooter (born 1980)

Personal information
- Nationality: Chinese
- Born: 11 March 1980 (age 46) Dalian, China
- Height: 1.78 m (5 ft 10 in)
- Weight: 65 kg (143 lb)

Sport
- Country: China
- Sport: Shooting
- Event: Double trap
- Club: Lianning
Medal record
World Championships
Silver medal – second place	2018 Changwon	Team double trap

Liu Anlong (simplified Chinese: 刘安龙; traditional Chinese: 劉安龍; pinyin: Liú Ānlóng; born 11 March 1980) is a Chinese sport shooter.

He participated at the 2018 ISSF World Shooting Championships, winning a medal.
