= Liu Tianyou =

Chinese sport shooter (born 1982)

Medal record

Men's shooting

Representing China

Asian Games
Gold medal – first place	2006 Doha	10 m air rifle

Asian Championships
Gold medal – first place	2012 Doha	10 m air rifle team
Silver medal – second place	2007 Kuwait City	10 m air rifle
Silver medal – second place	2007 Kuwait City	10 m air rifle team

World Cup
Bronze medal – third place	2005 Milan	10 m air rifle
Silver medal – second place	2006 Granada	10 m air rifle
Silver medal – second place	2006 Guanzhou	10 m air rifle
Bronze medal – third place	2007 Fort Benning	10 m air rifle

Liu Tianyou (born 1982 in Sichuan) is a male Chinese sport shooter. He won the gold medal at the 2006 Asian Games in the Men's 10 m Air Rifle event.

== Biography ==
Liu was born in 1982 in Sichuan, China. He is 170 cm tall and weighs 55 kg. Both Liu's dominant eye and hand are on the right. He has practiced shooting since 1998, and started officially competing in 2002, with Zhang Qiu Pin as his personal coach. Liu is currently enrolled a student at Tsinghua University, where he, like many Chinese athletes, strives to find a balance between training and schoolwork.

=== Competitions and awards ===
Liu's first medal, as a Junior, was at the 2002 ISSF World Shooting Championships in Lahti, Finland, where he won a bronze in the 50 metre rifle three positions event with a total of 1157 points. He won his second bronze in the 10-meter air rifle event at the ISSF World Cup meet in Milan, Italy, with 697.9 points.

In 2006, Liu won a silver medal in the men's 10-meter air rifle event at the ISSF World Cup meet in Guangzhou. He was the only Chinese qualifier for the final competition, with a total of 699.6 total points that got him the silver. He won another silver at the World Cup finals in Granada with 698.2 total points. That year, Liu also competed in Doha, Qatar, for the 2006 Asian Games, where he won his first gold medal in the Men's 10 m Air Rifle event, with 700.8 total points. This was the year that China dominated the Asian Games, winning 16 out of 20 gold medals on the first official day of competition. He, with Olympic champion Zhu Qinan and Li Jie, beat South Korea with 1,786 points to win the first gold of the Games.

In 2007, Liu won a silver medal in the men's 10-meter air rifle event in the 2007 Asian Championships at Kuwait City, with 700 points, and a bronze medal in the same event at the ISSF World Cup meet in Fort Benning, with 698.8 total points.
