= Liu Gang (sport shooter) =

Chinese sport shooter (born 1984)

Personal information
- Nationality: Chinese
- Born: 18 March 1984 (age 42) Shengyang, China
- Height: 1.68 m (5 ft 6 in)
- Weight: 78 kg (172 lb)

Sport
- Country: China
- Sport: Shooting
- Event: Rifle
Medal record
Men's shooting
Representing China
World Championships
Bronze medal – third place	2018 Changwon	50 m team rifle prone
Asian Championships
Gold medal – first place	2007 Kuwait City	50 m rifle prone team
Gold medal – first place	2019 Doha	50 m rifle prone team
Silver medal – second place	2019 Doha	50 m rifle prone

Liu Gang (born 19 March 1984) is a Chinese sport shooter.

He participated at the 2018 ISSF World Shooting Championships, winning a medal.
