= Mohammad Imam Hossain =

Bangladeshi sport shooter

Personal information
- Full name: Mohammad Imam Hossain
- Nationality: Bangladesh
- Born: 5 January 1984 (age 42)
- Height: 1.69 m (5 ft 6 1/2 in)
- Weight: 50 kg (110 lb)

Sport
- Sport: Shooting
- Event: 10 m air rifle

Mohammad Imam Hossain (Bengali: মোহাম্মদ ইমাম হোসেন, romanized: Mohāmmad Imām Hosen; born January 5, 1984) is a Bangladeshi sport shooter. Hossain represented Bangladesh at the 2008 Summer Olympics in Beijing, where he competed for the men's 10 m air rifle. He placed forty-sixth out of fifty-one shooters in the qualifying rounds, with a score of 581 points.
