= Na Yoon-kyung =

South Korean sports shooter

Personal information
- Born: 24 November 1982 (age 42); Seoul, South Korea

Sport
- Sport: Sports shooting

Na Yoon-kyung (born 24 November 1982) is a South Korean sports shooter. She competed in the Women's 10 metre air rifle and 50 metre rifle (3 positions) events at the 2012 Summer Olympics.
