= Wang Chengyi =

Chinese sport shooter (born 1983)

Olympic medal record

Women's shooting

Olympic Games
Bronze medal – third place	2004 Athens	50 m rifle 3 positions

Universiade
Gold medal – first place	2011 Shenzhen	50 m team rifle prone
Silver medal – second place	2011 Shenzhen	50 m rifle prone

Wang Chengyi (Chinese: 王成意; pinyin: Wáng Chéngyì; born July 17, 1983, in Xiangshan County, Zhejiang) is a female Chinese sports shooter who competed in the 2004 Summer Olympics.

She won the bronze medal in the women's 50 metre rifle three positions competition.
