= India at the 2006 Asian Games =

- IOC code: IND
- NOC: Indian Olympic Association

in Doha
- Competitors: 418
- Flag bearer: Jyoti Sunita Kullu
- Medals Ranked 8th: Gold 10 Silver 17 Bronze 26 Total 53

Asian Games appearances (overview)
- 1951; 1954; 1958; 1962; 1966; 1970; 1974; 1978; 1982; 1986; 1990; 1994; 1998; 2002; 2006; 2010; 2014; 2018; 2022; 2026

India competed at the 2006 Asian Games held in Doha, Qatar. India ranked 8th with 10 gold medals.

== Competitors ==
The following is a list of the number of competitors representing India in each sport at the Games:

Sport	Men	Women	Total
Aquatics – Swimming	4	1	5
Archery	4	4	8
Athletics	24	22	46
Badminton	8	2	10
Beach Volleyball	4	0	4
Boxing	10	0	10
Bowling	6	6	12
Canoeing	12	0	12
Chess	2	1	3
Cue Sports	13	4	17
Equestrian	5	0	5
Fencing	0	4	4
Football	20	0	20
Golf	4	3	7
Gymnastics – Artistic	6	0	6
Handball	16	16	32
Field hockey	16	16	32
Judo	6	5	11
Kabaddi	12	0	12
Rowing	8	4	12
Rugby	12	0	12
Sailing	9	0	9
Sepak takraw	12	13	25
Shooting	25	8	33
Squash	2	1	3
Table tennis	5	5	10
Taekwondo	4	2	6
Tennis – Lawn tennis	6	6	12
Triathlon	2	0	2
Volleyball	12	0	12
Wrestling	14	4	18
Wushu	7	1	8
Total	290	128	418

== Medal summary ==
=== Medal table ===
Sport	Gold	Silver	Bronze	Total
Shooting	3	5	6	14
Tennis	2	2	0	4
Chess	2	0	0	2
Athletics	1	4	4	9
Cue Sports	1	1	2	4
Kabaddi	1	0	0	1
Rowing	0	2	1	3
Wrestling	0	1	5	6
Sailing	0	1	1	2
Golf	0	1	0	1
Boxing	0	0	2	2
Archery	0	0	1	1
Equestrian	0	0	1	1
Hockey	0	0	1	1
Squash	0	0	1	1
Wushu	0	0	1	1
Total	10	17	26	53

== Medalists ==
=== Gold ===
Medal	Name	Sport	Event	Date
Gold	Pankaj Advani	Cue Sports	Men English Billiard Singles	
Gold	Humpy Koneru	Chess	Women's Rapid	
Gold	Jaspal Rana	Shooting	Men's 25 m Centre Fire Pistol	
Gold	Jaspal Rana	Shooting	Men's 25 m Standard Pistol	
Gold	Leander Paes; Mahesh Bhupathi	Tennis	Men's Doubles	
Gold	Leander Paes; Sania Mirza	Tennis	Mixed Doubles	
Gold	Sati Geetha Manjeet Kaur; Chitra Kulathummuriyal; Pinki Pramanik	Athletics	Women's 4 × 400 m Relay	
Gold	Men's team	Kabaddi		
Gold	Samresh Jung Vijay Kumar Jaspal Rana	Shooting	Men's 25 m Centre Fire Pistol Team	
Gold	Humpy Koneru Sasikiran Krishnan; Harikrishna Pantala	Chess	Mixed Team's Classical	

=== Silver ===
Medal	Name	Sport	Event	Date
Silver	Manjeet Kaur	Athletics	400 m	
Silver	Santhi Soudarajan	Athletics	800 m	
Silver	Anju Bobby George	Athletics	Long Jump	
Silver	Soma Biswas	Athletics	Heptathlon	
Silver	Ashok Shandiliya	Billiards	Singles	
Silver	Bajranglal Takhar	Rowing	Single Sculls	
Silver	Manavjit Singh Sandhu	Shooting	Trap	
Silver	Sania Mirza	Tennis	Singles	
Silver	Geetika Jakhar	Wrestling	63 kg Freestyle	
Silver	Men's team	Golf		
Silver	Men's team	Rowing	Coxless Fours	
Silver	Men's team	Sailing	Beneteau First class 7.5	
Silver	Men's team	Shooting	25 m Standard Pistol	
Silver	Men's team	Shooting	Trap	
Silver	Men's team	Shooting	Double Trap	
Silver	Women's team	Shooting	10 m Air Pistol	
Silver	Women's team	Tennis		

=== Bronze ===
Medal	Name	Sport	Event	Date
Bronze	Sinimol Paulose	Athletics	1500 m	
Bronze	O. P. Jaisha	Athletics	5000 m	
Bronze	J. J. Shobha	Athletics	Heptathlon	
Bronze	Krishna Punia	Athletics	Discus Throw	
Bronze	Geet Sethi & Ashok Shandiliya	Billiards	Doubles	
Bronze	Vijender Kumar	Boxing	Middleweight	
Bronze	Johnson Varghese	Boxing	Super Heavyweight	
Bronze	Bijender Singh & Kiran Yalamanchi	Rowing	Lightweight Double Sculls	
Bronze	Rajesh Choudhary	Sailing	Laser Radial	
Bronze	Rajyavardhan Singh Rathore	Shooting	Double Trap	
Bronze	Gagan Narang	Shooting	50 m Rifle 3 Positions	
Bronze	Vijay Kumar	Shooting	25m Rapid Fire Pistol	
Bronze	Saurav Ghosal	Squash	Singles	
Bronze	Vinayak Dalvi	Wrestling	55 kg Greco-Roman	
Bronze	Alka Tomar	Wrestling	55 kg Freestyle	
Bronze	Yogeshwar Dutt	Wrestling	60 kg Freestyle	
Bronze	Sushil Kumar	Wrestling	Men's Freestyle 66 kg	
Bronze	Palwinder Singh Cheema	Wrestling	Men's Freestyle 120 kg	
Bronze	Bimoljit Singh	Wushu	60 kg	
Bronze	Men's team	Archery		
Bronze		Equestrian	Eventing	
Bronze	Women team	Hockey		
Bronze	Men's team	Shooting	10 m Air Rifle	
Bronze	Women's team	Shooting	10 m Air Rifle	
Bronze	Men's team	Shooting	50 m Rifle 3 Positions	
Bronze	Men's team	Snooker		

== Medal Performance ==
Rank	NOC	Gold	Silver	Bronze	Total
08	India	10	17	26	53

== Aquatics - Swimming ==
Men

Event	Athletes	Heat		Final	
Event	Athletes	Time	Rank	Time	Rank
50 m freestyle	Virdhawal Khade	24.01	16th	Did not advance	
50 m freestyle	Ankur Poseria	24.70	24th	Did not advance	
100 m freestyle	Virdhawal Khade	52.12	10th	Did not advance	
100 m freestyle	Ankur Poseria	53.22	18th	Did not advance	
200 m freestyle	Virdhawal Khade	24.01	16th	Did not advance	
400 m freestyle	Rehan Poncha	4:07.72	14th	Did not advance	
50 m backstroke	Arjun Muralidharan	28.15	15th	Did not advance	
100 m backstroke	Arjun Muralidharan	1:01.64	19th	Did not advance	
50 m butterfly	Virdhawal Khade	25.59	15th	Did not advance	
50 m butterfly	Ankur Poseria	25.92	16th	Did not advance	
100 m butterfly	Ankur Poseria	57.14	18th	Did not advance	
100 m butterfly	Arjun Muralidharan	56.16	13th	Did not advance	
200 m butterfly	Arjun Muralidharan	2:07.96	10th	Did not advance	
200 m individual medley	Rehan Poncha	2:13.14	17th	Did not advance	
400 m individual medley	Rehan Poncha	4:40.69	11th	Did not advance	
4×100 m freestyle	Virdhawal Khade; Rehan Poncha; Ankur Poseria; Arjun Muralidharan	3:35.94	11th	Did not advance	
4×200 m freestyle	Virdhawal Khade; Rehan Poncha; Ankur Poseria; Arjun Muralidharan	8:10.12	12th	Did not advance	

Women

Event	Athletes	Heat		Final	
Event	Athletes	Time	Rank	Time	Rank
50 m freestyle	Shikha Tandon	27.40	13th	Did not advance	
100 m freestyle	Shikha Tandon	1:00.68	19th	Did not advance	

== Archery ==
=== Men ===
Athlete	Event	Ranking round		Round of 32	Round of 16	Quarterfinals	Semifinals	Final / BM	Rank
Athlete	Event	Score	Seed	Opposition Score	Opposition Score	Opposition Score	Opposition Score	Opposition Score	Rank
Mangal Singh Champia	Individual	1300	8	Manuja Kodikara (SRI); W 89–79	Tomokazu Wakino (JPN); L 102–98	did not advance			
Tarundeep Rai	Individual	1286	11	did not advance					
Vishwas (archer)	Individual	1262	22	did not advance					
Jayanta Talukdar	Individual	1287	10	Dambadondogiin Baatarjav (MGL); W 98–93	Wang Gang (CHN); L 102–108	did not advance			
Mangal Singh Champia; Tarundeep Rai Jayanta Talukdar; Vishwas (archer)	Team	3873	3	—N/a		Japan (JPN); W 219–206	Chinese Taipei (TPE); L 210–220	Malaysia (MAS); W 211–207	3rd place, bronze medalist(s)

=== Women ===
Athlete	Event	Ranking round		Round of 32	Round of 16	Quarterfinals	Semifinals	Final / BM	Rank
Athlete	Event	Score	Seed	Opposition Score	Opposition Score	Opposition Score	Opposition Score	Opposition Score	Rank
Reena Kumari	Individual	1291	12	Nurmanova (UZB); W 100–83	Novia Nuraini (INA); L 108–98	did not advance			
Chekrovolu Swuro	Individual	1236	25	did not advance					
Dola Banerjee	Individual	1286	16	Anbarasi Subramaniam (MAS); W 112–104	Kwon Un-sil (PRK); W 111–103	Yelena Plotnikova (KAZ); W 109–99	Yun Ok-hee (KOR); L 103–106	Zhao Ling (CHN); L 83–77	4
Punya Prabha	Individual	1229	31	did not advance					
Reena Kumari; Chekrovolu Swuro; Dola Banerjee	Team	3813	6	—N/a	Malaysia (MAS); W 197–166	China (CHN); L 201–199	did not advance		

== Athletics ==
=== Men ===
Track events

Event	Athletes	Heat Round 1		Final	
Event	Athletes	Result	Rank	Result	Rank
1500 m	Hamza Chatholi	3:44.35	5th QF	3:43.69	7th
5000 m	Sunil Kumar	—N/a		13:58.50	5th
5000 m	Surendra Singh	—N/a		13:59.05	6th
10000 m	Surendra Singh	—N/a		29:23.37	6th
4x400 m relay	Aboo Backer; Joseph Abraham; Bhupinder Singh; K.M. Binu	—N/a		3:06.65	2nd place, silver medalist(s)

Field events

Event	Athletes	Qualification		Final	
Event	Athletes	Result	Rank	Result	Rank
Long jump	Shiv Shankar Yadav	7.51	9th Q	7.64	7th
High jump	Hari Shankar Roy	—N/a		2.19	4th
Triple jump	Renjith Maheshwary	—N/a		16.54	4th
Shot put	Navpreet Singh	—N/a		18.99	4th
Shot put	Vikas Gowda	—N/a		18.09	7th
Discus throw	Vikas Gowda	—N/a		58.28	7th

Combined events

Decathlon
Event	P.J.Vinod		
Event	Results	Points	Rank
100 m	10.93	876	2nd
Long jump	7.11	840	5th'
Shot put	13.29	685	7th
High jump	1.91	723	7th
400 m	48.91	866	3rd
110 m hurdles	15.07	844	4th
Discus throw	33.35	531	10th
Pole vault	4.50	760	5th
Javelin throw	48.87	572	8th
1500 m	4:48.20	630	7th
Final Total		6th	

=== Women ===
Track events

Event	Athletes	Heat Round 1		Final	
Event	Athletes	Result	Rank	Result	Rank
200 m	Chitra Soman	24.74	4th	Did not advance	
400 m	Pinki Pramanik	53.90	2nd QF	53.06	4th
400 m	Manjeet Kaur	53.95	2nd QF	52.17	2nd place, silver medalist(s)
800 m	Santhi Soundarajan	DQ			
800 m	Sinimole Paulose	2:10.16	2nd QF	2:03.76	4th
1500 m	Orchatteri P. Jaisha	DNF			
1500 m	Sinimole Paulose			4:13.46	3rd place, bronze medalist(s)
5000 m	Preeja Sreedharan			15:51.89	5th
5000 m	Orchatteri P. Jaisha			15:41.91	3rd place, bronze medalist(s)
10000 m	Preeja Sreedharan			33.48.45	5th
4x100 m relay	Deepthi Jose; Nidhi Singh; Poonam Tomar; Jyothi Manjunath			46.29	5th
4x400 m relay	Manjeet Kaur; Sathi Geetha; Chitra Soman; Pinki Pramanik			3:32.95	1st place, gold medalist(s)

Field events

Event	Athletes	Final	
Event	Athletes	Result	Rank
Long jump	Anju Bobby George	6.52	2nd place, silver medalist(s)
Long jump	J.J. Shobha	6.13	8th
Triple jump	Anju Bobby George	DNS	
Discus throw	Krishna Poonia	61.53	3rd place, bronze medalist(s)
Pole vault	V.S. Surekha	3.8	6th
Hammer throw	Hardeep Kaur	56.41	6th

Combined events

Heptathlon
Event	Soma Biswas			J.J. Shobha		
Event	Results	Points	Rank	Results	Points	Rank
100 m hurdles	14.17	954	2nd	14.14	959	1st
High jump	1.62	759	6th	1.50	621	7th
Shot put	13.10	734	2nd	12.66	705	3rd
200 m	25.15	873	2nd	25.50	887	1st
Long jump	6.04	862	3rd	6.23	921	2nd
Javelin throw	43.73	739	3rd	45.09	765	2nd
800 m	2:23.05	783	1st	2:23.61	775	3rd
Final Total		5675	2nd place, silver medalist(s)		5662	3rd place, bronze medalist(s)

== Badminton ==
=== Men ===
Athlete	Event	Round of 32	Round of 16	Quarterfinal	Semifinal	Final / BM
Athlete	Event	Opposition Score	Opposition Score	Opposition Score	Opposition Score	Rank
Chetan Anand	Men's Singles	Olonbayaryn Enkhbat (MGL); W 2-0(21-5,21-6)	Lee Hyun-il (KOR); L 0-2(6-21,9-21)	did not advance		
Anup Sridhar	Men's Singles	Diluka Karunaratne (SRI); W 2-0(21-16,21-12)	Boonsak Ponsana (THA); L 1-2(17-21,21-19,16-21)	did not advance		
Rupesh Kumar K.T. Sanave Thomas	Men's doubles	Diluka Karunaratne/Dinuka Karunaratne (SRI); W 2-0(21-6,21-9)	Albertus Susanto / Yohan Hadikusumo (HKG); W 2-0(26-24,21-17)	Markis Kido / Hendra Setiawan (INA); L 1-2(21-18,9-21,11-21)	did not advance	
V Diju; J.B.S. Vidyadhar	Men's doubles	Hui Wai Ho/Wong Wai Hong (HKG); W 2-0(21-13,21-10)	Jung Jae-sung / Lee Yong-dae (KOR); L 0-2(16-21,14-21)	did not advance		

=== Women ===
Athlete	Event	Round of 32	Round of 16	Quarterfinal	Semifinal	Final / BM
Athlete	Event	Opposition Score	Opposition Score	Opposition Score	Opposition Score	Rank
Saina Nehwal	Women's Singles	Nadeesha Gayanthi (SRI); W 2-0(21-10,21-6)	Eriko Hirose (JPN); L 0-2(23-25,7-21)	did not advance		
Trupti Murgunde	Women's Singles	Julia Wong (MAS); L WO	did not advance			

== Bowling ==
=== Men ===
Athlete	Event	Games 1–6						Total	Grand total	Rank
Athlete	Event	1	2	3	4	5	6	Total	Grand total	Rank
Girish Ashok Gaba	Men's singles	171	189	200	217	182	195	1154		83rd
Sethu Madhavan	Men's singles	205	185	170	179	168	199	1106		92nd
Ajay Singh	Men's singles	179	175	162	222	167	164	1069		102nd
Aswathanarayana Srinath	Men's singles	199	164	171	186	185	163	1068		103rd
Vijay Punjabi	Men's singles	221	168	172	163	165	165	1054		107th
Dinesh Kumar	Men's singles	150	184	178	180	203	154	1049		108th
Aswathanarayana Srinath; Dinesh Kumar	Men's doubles	185	163	204	188	230	235	1205	2259	48th
Aswathanarayana Srinath; Dinesh Kumar	Men's doubles	172	170	170	180	179	183	1054	2259	48th
Vijay Punjabi; Girish Ashok Gaba	Men's doubles	195	167	184	180	138	202	1066	2170	50th
Vijay Punjabi; Girish Ashok Gaba	Men's doubles	224	198	169	187	153	173	1104	2170	50th
Ajay Singh; Sethu Madhavan	Men's doubles	178	185	185	179	167	166	1060	2114	52nd
Ajay Singh; Sethu Madhavan	Men's doubles	187	160	188	193	162	164	1054	2114	52nd
Vijay Punjabi; Aswathanarayana Srinath; Girish Ashok Gaba	Men's trios	221	157	212	266	195	186	1237	3469	30th
Vijay Punjabi; Aswathanarayana Srinath; Girish Ashok Gaba	Men's trios	224	148	161	207	193	179	1112	3469	30th
Vijay Punjabi; Aswathanarayana Srinath; Girish Ashok Gaba	Men's trios	166	192	189	159	247	167	1120	3469	30th
Dinesh Kumar; Ajay Singh; Sethu Madhavan	Men's trios	182	193	174	172	207	167	1095	3334	31st
Dinesh Kumar; Ajay Singh; Sethu Madhavan	Men's trios	184	188	157	218	203	183	1133	3334	31st
Dinesh Kumar; Ajay Singh; Sethu Madhavan	Men's trios	226	178	172	179	168	183	1106	3334	31st
Vijay Punjabi; Ajay Singh; Aswathanarayana Srinath; Dinesh Kumar; Girish Ashok Gaba; Sethu Madhavan	Men's team of five	195	201	165	169	195	164	1089	5480	17th
Vijay Punjabi; Ajay Singh; Aswathanarayana Srinath; Dinesh Kumar; Girish Ashok Gaba; Sethu Madhavan	Men's team of five	166	193	185	147	168	182	1041	5480	17th
Vijay Punjabi; Ajay Singh; Aswathanarayana Srinath; Dinesh Kumar; Girish Ashok Gaba; Sethu Madhavan	Men's team of five	202	182	213	164	191	176	1128	5480	17th
Vijay Punjabi; Ajay Singh; Aswathanarayana Srinath; Dinesh Kumar; Girish Ashok Gaba; Sethu Madhavan	Men's team of five				179	170	156	505	5480	17th
Vijay Punjabi; Ajay Singh; Aswathanarayana Srinath; Dinesh Kumar; Girish Ashok Gaba; Sethu Madhavan	Men's team of five	233	187	184	204	191	151	1150	5480	17th
Vijay Punjabi; Ajay Singh; Aswathanarayana Srinath; Dinesh Kumar; Girish Ashok Gaba; Sethu Madhavan	Men's team of five	199	199	169				567	5480	17th

All events

Athlete	Event	Singles	Doubles	Trío	Team	Total	Rank
Girish Ashok Gaba	Men's all events	1154	1104	1120	1150	4528	92nd
Aswathanarayana Srinath	Men's all events	1068	1205	1112	1128	4513	93rd
Vijay Punjabi	Men's all events	1054	1066	1237	1089	4446	97th
Sethu Madhavan	Men's all events	1106	1054	1106	1070	4336	102nd
Ajay Singh	Men's all events	1069	1060	1133	1041	4303	104th
Dinesh Kumar	Men's all events	1049	1054	1095	1080	4278	106th

== Chess ==
Athlete	Event	Win	Draw	Lost	Points	Rank
Pentala Harikrishna	Men's individual rapid	Tsegmediin Batchuluun (MGL); Ronald Dableo (PHI); Meylis Annaberdiyew (TKM); Ehsan Ghaemmaghami (IRI)	Elshan Moradi (IRI) Enamul Hossain (BAN); Reefat Bin Sattar (BAN)	Wang Yue (CHN); Dao Thien Hai (VIE)	5.5	11th
Krishnan Sasikiran	Men's individual rapid	Ahmad Samhouri (JOR); Wang Yue (CHN); Utut Adianto (INA)	Imad Hakki (SYR) Abdullah Hassan (UAE); Shinya Kojima (JPN)} Darwin Laylo (PHI); Mohammad Al-Sayed (QAT)	Murtas Kazhgaleyev (KAZ)	5.5	13th
Koneru Humpy	Women's individual rapid	Shamima Akter Liza (BAN); Nguyen Thi Thanh An (VIE); Olga Sabirova (UZB); Atousa Pourkashiyan (IRI) Zhu Chen (QAT); Irine Kharisma Sukandar (INA); Mahri Geldiyewa (TKM); Dana Aketayeva (KAZ)		Zhao Xue (CHN)	8	1st place, gold medalist(s)
Krishnan Sasikiran; Pendyala Harikrishna; Koneru Humpy	Mixed team standard	Mongolia (MGL); 2.5-0.5 Turkmenistan (TKM); 3.0-0; Qatar (QAT); 2-1; Vietnam (VIE); 2.5-0.5; China (CHN); 2-1; Uzbekistan (UZB); 3-0; Iran (IRI); 2.5-0.5; Indonesia (INA); 2.5-0.5	Kazakhstan (KAZ); 1.5-1.5	0	22.5	1st place, gold medalist(s)

== Cue Sports ==
Athlete	Event	Round of 64	Round of 32	Round of 16	Quarterfinals	Semifinals	Final
Athlete	Event	Opposition Result	Opposition Result	Opposition Result	Opposition Result	Opposition Result	Opposition Result
Balachandra Bhaskar	Men's Carom 3 Cushion Singles			Tatsuo Arai (JPN); W WO	Duong Anh Vu (VIE); L 14–40	Did not advance	
Ranjan Kosaraju	Men's Carom 3 Cushion Singles			Ly The Vinh (VIE); L 40–10	Did not advance		
Pankaj Advani	Men's English Billiards Singles		BYE	Nguyen Thanh (VIE); W 3–2	Praprut Chaithanasakun (THA); W 3–0	Aung San Oo (MYA); W 3–1	Ashok Shandilya (IND); W 3–1 (gold)
Ashok Shandilya	Men's English Billiards Singles		BYE	Ahmed Ghulam (BRN); W 3–0	Reynaldo Grandea (PHI); W 3–0	Peter Gilchrist (SIN); W 3–0	Pankaj Advani (IND); L 1–3 (silver)
Ashok Shandilya; Geet Sethi	Men's English Billiards Doubles			BYE	Lee Wansoo; Park Seungchil (KOR); W 3–0	Aung San Oo; Kyaw Oo (MYA); W 3–2	Vishan Gir; Sohail Shahzad (PAK); W 3–0 (bronze)
Dharminder Lilly	Men's Eight-ball Singles	BYE	Jalal Odetalah (JOR); L 7–9	Did not advance			
Alok Kumar	Men's Eight-ball Singles	BYE	Nayef Al-Jawini (KSA); W 9–7	Jeong Young-hwa (KOR); W 9–5	Antonio Gabica (PHI); L 6–9	Did not advance	
Mohammad Asim	Men's Nine-ball singles	BYE	Tepwin Arunnath (THA); L 7–11	Did not advance			
Sumit Talwar	Men's Nine-ball singles	BYE	Muhammad Zulfikri (INA); W 11–10	Wu Chiaching (TPE); L 1–11	Did not advance		
Yasin Merchant	Men's Snooker singles	Firas Kamel (IRQ); W 4–3	Munther Al-Basri (BRN); W 4–1	Nezar Aseeri (KSA); L 0–4	Did not advance		
Manan Chandra	Men's Snooker singles	Mubarak Al-Owais (KUW); W 4–1	Reenat Walem (IRQ); L 2–4	Did not advance			
Yasin Merchant Manan Chandra	Men's Snooker Doubles		BYE	Wela Henrige Jayawardena Prasanna Pushpakumara (SRI); W 3–0	Atthasit Mahitthi Phaitoon Phonbun (THA); L 1–3	Did not advance	
Rupesh Shah; Aditya Mehta; Yasin Merchant	Men's Snooker team		Singapore; W WO	Iraq; W 3–2	Pakistan; W 3–0	China; L 3–0	Malaysia; W 3–0 (bronze)
Chitra Magimairaj	Women's Eight-ball Singles		Rubilen Amit (PHI); L 2–7	Did not advance			
Anuja Thakur	Women's Eight-ball Singles		Zhou Mengmeng (CHN); L 3–7	Did not advance			
Vidya Pillai	Women's Nine-ball singles		BYE	Liu Shinmei (TPE); L 6–7	Did not advance		
Meenal Thakur	Women's Nine-ball singles		BYE	Zhou Mengmeng (CHN); W WO	Esther Kwan (MAS); L 2–7	Did not advance	

== Football ==
=== Men ===
==== Team ====
Coach: (England) Bob Houghton

No.	Pos.	Player	Date of birth (age)	Club
1	GK	Subrata Pal	24 November 1986 (aged 20)	(All India Football Federation) Mohun Bagan
2	DF	N. S. Manju	9 May 1987 (aged 19)	(All India Football Federation) Mahindra United
3	MF	Steven Dias	25 December 1983 (aged 22)	(All India Football Federation) Mahindra United
4	DF	Debabrata Roy	4 November 1986 (aged 20)	(All India Football Federation) East Bengal
5	DF	Irungbam Surkumar Singh	21 March 1983 (aged 23)	(All India Football Federation) Mahindra United
6	DF	Habibur Rehman Mondal	27 May 1986 (aged 20)	(All India Football Federation) Mohammedan Kolkata
7	DF	Pappachen Pradeep	28 April 1983 (aged 23)	(All India Football Federation) Mahindra United
9	FW	Sunil Chhetri	3 August 1984 (aged 22)	(All India Football Federation) JCT Mills
10	FW	Manjit Singh	25 January 1986 (aged 20)	(All India Football Federation) Mahindra United
11	FW	Syed Rahim Nabi	14 December 1985 (aged 20)	(All India Football Federation) East Bengal
12	FW	Subhas Sumbhu Chakrobarty	23 October 1985 (aged 21)	(All India Football Federation) Mohun Bagan
13	MF	Bungo Singh	2 March 1983 (aged 23)	(All India Football Federation) Churchill Brothers
14	DF	Anupam Sarkar	6 December 1985 (aged 20)	(All India Football Federation) East Bengal
15	FW	Bhaichung Bhutia	15 December 1976 (aged 29)	(All India Football Federation) Mohun Bagan
16	MF	Gouramangi Singh	25 January 1986 (aged 20)	(All India Football Federation) Sporting Goa
18	FW	Sushil Kumar Singh	1 April 1989 (aged 17)	(All India Football Federation) Mohun Bagan
20	GK	Subhasish Roy Chowdhury	27 September 1986 (aged 20)	(All India Football Federation) Mahindra United
21	MF	Chitrasen Chandam	7 February 1986 (aged 20)	(All India Football Federation) Churchill Brothers
22	MF	Climax Lawrence	16 January 1979 (aged 27)	(All India Football Federation) Dempo
24	GK	Sandip Nandy	15 January 1975 (aged 31)	(All India Football Federation) Mahindra United

==== Group D ====
Pos	Team	Pld	W	D	L	GF	GA	GD	Pts
1	Iran	3	3	0	0	7	2	+5	9
2	Hong Kong	3	1	1	1	3	3	0	4
3	India	3	1	1	1	3	4	−1	4
4	Maldives	3	0	0	3	2	6	−4	0

Source: RSSSF
29 November
17:15

India	1–1	Hong Kong
Pradeep 88'		Chan Siu Ki 90+2'

Al-Gharafa Stadium, Al-Rayyan
Attendance: 100
Referee: Jaafar Mahfoodh (Bahrain)

3 December
17:15

India	2–1	Maldives
I. Singh 34'; Chakrobarty 89'		Ashfaq 38'

Al-Sadd Stadium, Doha
Attendance: 800
Referee: Ali Al-Badwawi (United Arab Emirates)

6 December
17:15

Iran	2–0	India
Akbari 78'; Borhani 90+2'

Al-Sadd Stadium, Doha
Attendance: 3,500
Referee: Abdulrahman Abdou (Qatar)

== Kabaddi ==
All times are Indian Standard Time (UTC+05:30)

=== Round robin ===
Pos	Team	Pld	W	D	L	PF	PA	PD	Pts
1	India	4	4	0	0	153	83	+70	8
2	Pakistan	4	3	0	1	141	107	+34	6
3	Iran	4	1	1	2	122	146	−24	3
4	Bangladesh	4	1	0	3	129	165	−36	2
5	Japan	4	0	1	3	92	136	−44	1

Source: Official website

2 December; 12:30	India	40–21	Bangladesh	Aspire Hall 4, Doha
2 December; 12:30		(24–14)		Aspire Hall 4, Doha

2 December; 19:30	Japan	25–44	India	Aspire Hall 4, Doha
2 December; 19:30		(11–29)		Aspire Hall 4, Doha

4 December; 20:30	India	31–20	Pakistan	Aspire Hall 4, Doha
4 December; 20:30		(9–11)		Aspire Hall 4, Doha

5 December; 19:30	Iran	17–38	India	Aspire Hall 4, Doha
5 December; 19:30		(10–14)		Aspire Hall 4, Doha

=== Final round ===
==== Gold medal match ====
6 December; 20:30	India	35–23	Pakistan	Aspire Hall 4, Doha
6 December; 20:30		(21–14)		Aspire Hall 4, Doha

== Rowing ==
Men

Athlete	Event	Heats		Repechages		Semifinals		Final	
Athlete	Event	Time	Rank	Time	Rank	Time	Rank	Time	Rank
Bajrang Lal Takhar	Single Sculls	4:09.64	2nd F	auto advancement		3:20.11	2nd F	3:39.43	2nd place, silver medalist(s)
Anil Kumar Mehrolia; Bajrang Lal Takhar	Double Sculls	4:02.42	3rd	3:53.91	1st F	3:33.33	2nd F	3:25.90	4th
Jenil Krishnan; Dharmesh Sangwan; Sukhjeet Singh; Satish Joshi	Coxless Four	3:21.03	1st F	auto advancement		2:50.51	1st F	3:08.98	2nd place, silver medalist(s)
Anil Kumar Mehrolia	Lightweight Single Sculls	4:21.68	1st F	auto advancement		3:28.66	4th	3:58.46	5th
Bijender Singh; Kiran Yalamanchi	Lightweight Double Sculls	4:15.29	1st F	auto advancement		3:39.02	2nd F	3:26.01	3rd place, bronze medalist(s)

Women

Athlete	Event	Heats		Repechage		Semifinal		Final	
Athlete	Event	Time	Rank	Time	Rank	Time	Rank	Time	Rank
Munshadi Khatun; Mamata Jena; Swathy Sanjay; Pravasini Dwibedy	Coxless Four	4:43.29	2nd F	auto advancement		4:02.93	3rd	3:57.31	6th

== Shooting ==
Men

Event	Athlete	Qualification		Final	
Event	Athlete	Score	Rank	Score	Rank
Men's 10 m air pistol	Samaresh Jung	576	11th	Did not advance	
Men's 10 m air pistol	Deepak Sharma	571	22nd	Did not advance	
Men's 10 m air pistol	Ronak Pandit	565	33rd	Did not advance	
Men's 10 m air pistol team	Samaresh Jung; Deepak Sharma; Ronak Pandit			1712	7th
Men's 10 m air rifle	Gagan Narang	595	3rd	696.4	5th
Men's 10 m air rifle	P.T. Raghunath	592	8th	693.9	8th
Men's 10 m air rifle	Navanath Faratade	589	13th	Did not advance	
Men's 10 m air rifle team	Gagan Narang; P.T. Raghunath; Navanath Faratade			1776	3rd place, bronze medalist(s)
Men's 25 m standard pistol	Jaspal Rana			574	1st place, gold medalist(s)
Men's 25 m standard pistol	Ronak Pandit			558	18th
Men's 25 m standard pistol	Samaresh Jung			558	19th
Men's 25 m standard pistol team	Jaspal Rana; Ronak Pandit; Samaresh Jung			1690	2nd place, silver medalist(s)
Men's 25 m rapid fire pistol	Vijay Kumar	577	4th	775.3	3rd place, bronze medalist(s)
Men's 25 m rapid fire pistol	Pemba Tamang	574	9th	Did not advance	
Men's 25 m rapid fire pistol	Rahul Panwar	563	20th	Did not advance	
Men's 25 m rapid fire pistol team	Vijay Kumar; Pemba Tamang; Rahul Panwar			1714	4th
Men's 25 m center fire pistol	Jaspal Rana			590	1st place, gold medalist(s)
Men's 25 m center fire pistol	Vijay Kumar			580	9th
Men's 25 m center fire pistol	Samaresh Jung			578	12th
Men's 25 m center fire pistol team	Jaspal Rana; Vijay Kumar; Samaresh Jung			1748	1st place, gold medalist(s)
Men's 50 m pistol	Samaresh Jung	550	14th	Did not advance	
Men's 50 m pistol	Bapu Vanjare	545	19th	Did not advance	
Men's 50 m pistol	Zakir Khan	541	24th	Did not advance	
Men's 50 m pistol team	Samaresh Jung; Bapu Vanjare; Zakir Khan			1636	7th
Men's 50 m rifle prone	Sushil Ghalay	583	17th	Did not advance	
Men's 50 m rifle prone	Imran Hassan Khan	579	34th	Did not advance	
Men's 50 m rifle prone	Surendra Singh Rathod	586	12th	Did not advance	
Men's 50 m rifle prone team	Sushil Ghalay; Imran Hassan Khan; Surendra Singh Rathod			1732	10th
Men's 50 m rifle three positions	Gagan Narang	1162	5th	1261.9	3rd place, bronze medalist(s)
Men's 50 m rifle three positions	Imran Hassan Khan	1140	18th	Did not advance	
Men's 50 m rifle three positions	Sanjeev Rajput	1154	9th	Did not advance	
Men's 50 m rifle three positions team	Gagan Narang; Imran Hassan Khan; Sanjeev Rajput			3456	3rd place, bronze medalist(s)
Men's Trap	Manavjit Singh Sandhu	113	2nd	130	2nd place, silver medalist(s)
Men's Trap	Mansher Singh	99	23rd	Did not advance	
Men's Trap	Anwer Sultan	110	5th	122	6th
Men's Trap team	Manavjit Singh Sandhu; Mansher Singh; Anwer Sultan			322	2nd place, silver medalist(s)
Men's Double Trap	Rajyavardhan Singh Rathore	139	3rd	185	3rd place, bronze medalist(s)
Men's Double Trap	Ronjan Sodhi	136	8th	Did not advance	
Men's Double Trap	Vikram Bhatnagar	134	10th	Did not advance	
Men's Double Trap team	Rajyavardhan Singh Rathore; Ronjan Sodhi; Vikram Bhatnagar			409	2nd place, silver medalist(s)
Men's Skeet	Mairaj Ahmad Khan	112	28th	Did not advance	
Men's Skeet	Man Singh	112	29th	Did not advance	
Men's Skeet	Allan Daniel Peoples	110	32nd	Did not advance	
Men's Skeet team	Mairaj Ahmad Khan; Allan Daniel Peoples; Man Singh			334	9th

Women

Event	Athlete	Qualification		Final	
Event	Athlete	Score	Rank	Score	Rank
Women's 10 m air pistol	Harveen Srao	383	5th	484.5	4th
Women's 10 m air pistol	Sonia Rai	381	9th	Did not advance	
Women's 10 m air pistol	Shweta Chaudhary	378	17th	Did not advance	
Women's 10 m air pistol team	Harveen Srao; Sonia Rai; Shweta Chaudhary			1142	2nd place, silver medalist(s)
Women's 25 m air pistol	Sonia Rai	562	29th	Did not advance	
Women's 25 m air pistol	Shweta Chaudhary	569	21st	Did not advance	
Women's 10 m air rifle	Avneet Sidhu	396	6th	498.6	5th
Women's 10 m air rifle	Tejaswini Sawant	395	8th	497.1	8th
Women's 10 m air rifle	Suma Shirur	390	25th	Did not advance	
Women's 10 m air rifle team	Avneet Sidhu; Tejaswini Sawant; Suma Shirur			1181	3rd place, bronze medalist(s)
Women's 50 m rifle prone	Tejaswini Sawant			581	15th
Women's 50 m rifle prone	Deepali Deshpande			578	20th
Women's 50 m rifle prone	Anjali Bhagwat			578	21st
Women's 50 m rifle prone team	Anjali Bhagwat; Tejaswini Sawant; Deepali Deshpande			1737	5th
Women's 50 m rifle three positions	Tejaswini Sawant	578	6th	672.9	7th
Women's 50 m rifle three positions	Deepali Deshpande	570	19th	Did not advance	
Women's 50 m rifle three positions	Anjali Bhagwat	569	22nd	Did not advance	
Women's 50 m rifle three positions team	Tejaswini Sawant; Deepali Deshpande; Anjali Bhagwat			1717	5th

== Tennis ==
Athlete	Event	Round of 64	Round of 32	Round of 16	Quarterfinals	Semifinals	Final
Athlete	Event	Opposition Result	Opposition Result	Opposition Result	Opposition Result	Opposition Result	Opposition Result
Karan Rastogi	Men's singles	BYE	Baataryn Oyuunbat (MGL); W 6-0, 6-1	Jimmy Wang (TPE); L 6-2, 5-7, 5-7	Did not advance		
Rohan Bopanna	Men's singles	BYE	Sun Peng (CHN); L 3-6, 3-6	Did not advance			
Leander Paes; Mahesh Bhupathi	Men's doubles		Yu Hiu Tung (HKG) and Wayne Wong (HKG); W 6-0, 6-4	Mohammad Ghareeb (KUW) and Ahmad Al-Rabee (KUW); W 6-1, 6-1	Aisam-ul-Haq Qureshi (PAK) and Aqeel Khan (PAK); W 6-2, 6-4	Cecil Mamiit (PHI) and Eric Taino (PHI); W 6-2,6-4	Sanchai Ratiwatana (THA) and Sonchat Ratiwatana (THA); W 7-5, 6-7,6-3 (gold)
Mustafa Ghouse; Rohan Bopanna	Men's doubles		Abdulrahman Shehbab (BRN) and Abdul latif Mohamed (BRN); W 6-2, 6-1	Lee Hsin-han (TPE) and Hseih Wang-cheng (TPE); W 6-1, 7-6	Jun Woong-sun (KOR) and Kim Sun-yong (KOR); L 6-7, 1-6	Did not advance	
Karan Rastogi; Rohan Bopanna; Leander Paes; Mahesh Bhupathi	Men's team			Chinese Taipei (TPE); L 1-2 (0-2, 2-1, 0-2)	Did not advance		
Sania Mirza	Women's singles		BYE	Yoo Mi (KOR); W 6-1, 6-4	Suchanun Viratprasert (THA); W 6-3, 6-2	Li Na (CHN); W 6-2, 6-2	Zheng Jie (CHN); L 4-6, 6-1,6-1 (silver)
Shikha Uberoi	Women's singles		Linda Abu-Mushref (BRN); W 6-3, 6-7,7-5	Zheng Jie (CHN); L 0r-4	Did not advance		
Sania Mirza; Shikha Uberoi	Women's doubles		BYE	Ryoko Fuda (JPN) and Tomoko Yonemura (JPN); L 3-6, 6-7	Did not advance		
Rushmi Chakravarthi; Ankita Bhambri	Women's doubles		Huynh Mai Huynh (VIE) and Ngo Viet Ha (VIE); W 6-3, 6-3	Akiko Morigami (JPN) and Aiko Nakamura (JPN); L 3-6, 4-6	Did not advance		
Sania Mirza; Shikha Uberoi; Ankita Bhambri; Isha Lakhani	Women's team			BYE	Thailand (THA); W 2-1 (2-0, 2-0, 0-2)	Uzbekistan (UZB); W 2-0 (2-1, 2-0)	Chinese Taipei (TPE); L 1-2 (0-2, 2-0, 0-2) (silver)
Sania Mirza; Leander Paes	Mixed doubles		BYE	Murad Inoyatov (UZB) and Dilyara Saidkhodjayeva (UZB); W 6-1, 6-3	Sonchat Ratiwatana (THA) and Montinee Tangphong (THA); W 6-4, 6-3	Yu Xinyuan (CHN) and Sun Tiantian (CHN); W 6-3, 2-6, 6-1	Satoshi Iwabuchi (JPN) and Akiko Morigami (JPN); W 7-5, 5-7, 6-2 (gold)
Mahesh Bhupathi; Shikha Uberoi	Mixed doubles		BYE	Sanchai Ratiwatana (THA) and Suchanun Viratprasert (THA); L 4-6, 4-6	Did not advance		

== Volleyball ==
=== Men ===
Team

- Yejju Subba Rao
- Mandeep Singh
- Siva Rajan
- M. N. Vikram
- Guttikonda Pradeep
- K. J. Kapil Dev
- Tom Joseph
- Jitendra Singh
- Raveendra Rajeev
- Sanjay Kumar
- Balwinder Singh
- P. S. Srikanth

==== Pool A ====
Pos	Team	Pld	W	L	Pts	SPW	SPL	SPR	SW	SL	SR
1	Saudi Arabia	4	4	0	8	362	285	1.270	12	3	4.000
2	India	4	3	1	7	330	272	1.213	10	3	3.333
3	Kuwait	4	1	3	5	338	352	0.960	7	9	0.778
4	Lebanon	4	1	3	5	323	371	0.871	4	11	0.364
5	United Arab Emirates	4	1	3	5	241	314	0.768	3	10	0.300

Source: Results

Date	Time		Score		Set 1	Set 2	Set 3	Set 4	Set 5	Total
03 Dec	20:00	India	3–0	Lebanon	25–18	39–37	25–23			89–78
04 Dec	20:00	Saudi Arabia	3–1	India	25–21	25–22	23–25	25–23		98–91
07 Dec	12:00	India	3–0	Kuwait	25–17	25–16	25–18			75–51
09 Dec	14:00	United Arab Emirates	0–3	India	12–25	14–25	19–25			45–75
