= Qatar at the 2006 Asian Games =

- IOC code: QAT
- NOC: Qatar Olympic Committee

in Doha
- Flag bearer: Ahmed Saad Al-Saad
- Medals Ranked 9th: Gold 9 Silver 12 Bronze 11 Total 32

Asian Games appearances (overview)
- 1978; 1982; 1986; 1990; 1994; 1998; 2002; 2006; 2010; 2014; 2018; 2022; 2026

Qatar hosted and competed in the 15th Asian Games, officially known as the XV Asiad held in Doha from December 1 to December 15, 2006. Qatar ranked 9th with 9 gold medals in this edition of the Asiad.

== Medalists ==
Medal	Name	Sport	Event	Date
Gold	Awad Al-Qahtani; Rashid Al-Marri; Ali Al-Marri; Abdulla Al-Ejail	Equestrian	Team eventing	8
Gold	Abdulqader Hikmat	Taekwondo	Men's 78 kg	8
Gold	Kamal Abdulsalam	Bodybuilding	Men's 85 kg	9
Gold	Ali Tabrizi	Bodybuilding	Men's 90 kg	9
Gold	Daham Najim Bashir	Athletics	Men's 1500 metres	10
Gold	Mubarak Hassan Shami	Athletics	Men's marathon	10
Gold	James Kwalia	Athletics	Men's 5000 metres	12
Gold	Ali Al-Rumaihi	Equestrian	Individual jumping	12
Gold	Mohamed Saqr; Abdulrahman Mesbeh; Abdulla Al-Berik; Majdi Siddiq; Ali Nasser; Mesaad Al-Hamad; Hussein Yasser; Magid Mohamed; Ibrahim Al-Ghanim; Talal Al-Bloushi; Adel Lami; Wesam Rizik; Waleed Jassem; Yusef Ahmed; Abdullah Koni; Qasem Burhan; Sebastián Soria; Khalfan Ibrahim; Younes Ali; Bilal Mohammed	Football	Men	15
Silver	Abdulla Al-Qattan; Saeed Al-Hajri	Bowling	Men's doubles	4
Silver	Mohammed Abou-Teama; Khalid Al-Kuwari; Mohammed Amin Sobhi	Shooting	Men's 10 metre running target mixed team	6
Silver	Jaber Saeed Salem	Weightlifting	Men's +105 kg	6
Silver	Gamal Belal Salem	Athletics	Men's 3000 metres steeplechase	8
Silver	Abdulla Al-Ejail	Equestrian	Individual eventing	8
Silver	Essa Ismail Rashed	Athletics	Men's 10,000 metres	9
Silver	Jassim Abdulla	Bodybuilding	Men's +90 kg	9
Silver	Rashid Shafi Al-Dosari	Athletics	Men's discus throw	10
Silver	Khalid Habash Al-Suwaidi	Athletics	Men's shot put	11
Silver	Waleed Al-Sharshani	Sailing	Laser 4.7	12
Silver	Anas Al-Suweidan; Adnan Al-Ali; Khalid Al-Hashmi; Rashid Al-Remaihi; Samir Hashim; Abdulla Saad Al-Saad; Mohamed Bajawi; Mohammed Walid Ghazal; Ahmed Saad Al-Saad; Mubarak Bilal Al-Ali; Mohsin Yafai; Yousef Ashoor; Fawaz Al-Moadhadi; Khalid Al-Marri; Yousef Al-Maalem; Badi Johar	Handball	Men	14
Silver	Khalid Masoud; Malek Saleem; Saad Abdulrahman; Daoud Musa; Khalid Suliman; Ali Turki; Yasseen Ismail; Erfan Ali Saeed; Mohammed Saleem; Mohammed Salaheldin; Hashim Zaidan; Omer Abdelqader	Basketball	Men	15
Bronze	Zhu Chen	Chess	Women's individual rapid	4
Bronze	Anisa Saleh Juma; Samsam Saleh Juma; Amal Mohammed	Shooting	Women's 10 metre running target team	4
Bronze	Mohammed Amin Sobhi	Shooting	Men's 10 metre running target	5
Bronze	Mohammed Abou-Teama; Khalid Al-Kuwari; Mohammed Amin Sobhi	Shooting	Men's 10 metre running target team	5
Bronze	Bakhit Sharif Badr	Wrestling	Men's Greco-Roman 74 kg	9
Bronze	Abdulqader Al-Adhami	Taekwondo	Men's +84 kg	10
Bronze	Sultan Khamis Zaman	Athletics	Men's 5000 metres	12
Bronze	Abdullah Dalloul	Karate	Men's kumite 60 kg	12
Bronze	Huzam Nabaah	Boxing	Men's 81 kg	13
Bronze	Magid Adwan	Karate	Men's kumite 65 kg	13
Bronze	Fahad Al-Hajri; Mohammed Al-Thani; Essa Al-Mannai; Ali Al-Malki	Equestrian	Team endurance	14
