= Vietnam at the 2006 Asian Games =

- IOC code: VIE
- NOC: Vietnam Olympic Committee

in Doha 1–5 December
- Flag bearer: Nguyễn Trọng Cường
- Medals Ranked 19th: Gold 3 Silver 13 Bronze 7 Total 23

Asian Games appearances (overview)
- 1954; 1958; 1962; 1966; 1970; 1974; 1978; 1982; 1986; 1990; 1994; 1998; 2002; 2006; 2010; 2014; 2018; 2022; 2026

Vietnam participated at the 2006 Asian Games, held in Doha, Qatar from December 1 to December 15, 2006. Vietnam ranked 19th with 3 gold medals in this edition of the Asiad.

== Medalists ==
Medal	Name	Sport	Event	Date
Gold	Nguyễn Đức Thu Hiền; Lưu Thị Thanh; Nguyễn Thị Thúy An; Nguyễn Thị Hoa; Nguyễn Thị Bích Thủy; Nguyễn Thịnh Thu Ba; Nguyễn Hải Thảo; Lê Thị Hạnh; Đỗ Thị Thu Hiền; Cao Thị Yến; Nguyễn Bạch Vân	Sepak takraw	Women's team regu	6
Gold	Vũ Thị Nguyệt Ánh	Karate	Women's kumite 48 kg	12
Gold	Nguyễn Đức Thu Hiền; Lưu Thị Thanh; Nguyễn Hải Thảo	Sepak takraw	Women's doubles	13
Silver	Hoàng Anh Tuấn	Weightlifting	Men's 56 kg	2
Silver	Đào Thiên Hải	Chess	Men's individual rapid	4
Silver	Đặng Hồng Hà; Đỗ Thu Trà; Nguyễn Thị Thu Hằng	Shooting	Women's 10 metre running target team	4
Silver	Phạm Văn Mách	Bodybuilding	Men's 60 kg	8
Silver	Dương Anh Vũ	Cue sports	Men's three-cushion singles	8
Silver	Hoàng Hà Giang	Taekwondo	Women's 55 kg	9
Silver	Lưu Thị Thanh; Nguyễn Thị Thúy An; Nguyễn Thị Bích Thủy; Nguyễn Thịnh Thu Ba; Nguyễn Hải Thảo	Sepak takraw	Women's regu	10
Silver	Nguyễn Thị Hoài Thu	Taekwondo	Women's 59 kg	10
Silver	Nguyễn Hoàng Ngân	Karate	Women's kata	12
Silver	Nguyễn Thị Hải Yến	Karate	Women's kumite 60 kg	13
Silver	Phạm Quốc Khánh	Wushu	Men's nanquan	14
Silver	Phan Quốc Vinh	Wushu	Men's sanda 52 kg	14
Silver	Nguyễn Đức Trung	Wushu	Men's sanda 65 kg	14
Bronze	Hoàng Xuân Vinh; Nguyễn Mạnh Tường; Trần Quốc Cường	Shooting	Men's 10 metre air pistol team	3
Bronze	Đặng Hồng Hà	Shooting	Women's 10 metre running target	4
Bronze	Nguyễn Mạnh Cường; Nguyễn Văn Tùng; Trần Hoàng Vũ	Shooting	Men's 10 metre running target mixed team	6
Bronze	Đỗ Thị Bích Hạnh	Taekwondo	Women's 51 kg	8
Bronze	Bùi Thu Hiền	Taekwondo	Women's 67 kg	8
Bronze	Vũ Anh Tuấn	Taekwondo	Men's 62 kg	9
Bronze	Phạm Trần Nguyên	Karate	Men's kumite 55 kg	12
