= Shooting at the 2010 Asian Games – Men's trap =

Men's trap at the 2010 Asian Games
- Venue: Guangzhou Shotgun Centre
- Dates: 18–19 November 2010
- Competitors: 37 from 15 nations

Medalists
gold medal	Naser Al-Meqlad	Athletes from Kuwait
silver medal	Khaled Al-Mudhaf	Athletes from Kuwait
bronze medal	Joe Salem	Lebanon

The men's trap competition at the 2010 Asian Games in Guangzhou, China was held on 18 and 19 November at the Guangzhou Shotgun Centre.

== Schedule ==
All times are China Standard Time (UTC+08:00)

Date	Time	Event
Thursday, 18 November 2010	09:00	Qualification day 1
Friday, 19 November 2010	09:00	Qualification day 2
Friday, 19 November 2010	14:00	Final

== Records ==
Prior to this competition, the existing world, Asian and Games records were as follows.

Qualification
World Record	Giovanni Pellielo (ITA)	125	Nicosia, Cyprus	1 April 1994
Asian Record	Khaled Al-Mudhaf (KUW)	124	Atlanta, United States	14 May 1998
Games Record	Fahad Al-Deehani (KUW)	123	Hiroshima, Japan	8 October 1994
Final
World Record	Karsten Bindrich (GER)	149	Nicosia, Cyprus	9 July 2008
Asian Record	Manavjit Singh Sandhu (IND)	146	New Delhi, India	24 February 2010
Games Record	Naser Al-Meqlad (KUW)	133	Doha, Qatar	3 December 2006

== Results ==
=== Qualification ===
Rank	Athlete	Day 1			Day 2		Total	S-off	Notes
Rank	Athlete	1	2	3	4	5	Total	S-off	Notes
1	Joe Salem (LIB)	24	24	25	24	24	121		
2	Khaled Al-Mudhaf (IOC)	25	22	25	23	25	120		
3	Naser Al-Meqlad (IOC)	23	24	24	23	24	118		
4	Manavjit Singh Sandhu (IND)	23	24	23	24	25	119		
5	Savate Sresthaporn (THA)	23	24	25	24	20	116		
6	Abdo Al-Yazgie (LIB)	23	24	23	23	22	115	+1	
7	Zhang Yongjie (CHN)	24	23	24	23	21	115	+0	
8	Joseph Hanna (LIB)	24	24	22	25	20	115	+0	
9	Chen Seong Fook (MAS)	23	21	23	23	24	114		
10	Andrey Mogilevskiy (KAZ)	23	22	22	23	24	114		
11	Jung Chang-hee (KOR)	23	22	23	23	23	114		
12	Abdulrahman Al-Faihan (IOC)	20	24	25	22	23	114		
13	Yu Xiaokai (CHN)	22	23	24	23	22	114		
14	Mohammed Al-Rumaihi (QAT)	21	22	23	22	25	113		
15	Jethro Dionisio (PHI)	25	23	19	22	24	113		
16	Choo Choon Seng (SIN)	22	22	23	24	22	113		
17	Mansher Singh (IND)	22	23	22	24	22	113		
18	Hagen Topacio (PHI)	24	23	25	23	18	113		
19	Alexandr Gorun (KAZ)	25	19	24	21	22	111		
20	Li Yajun (CHN)	23	22	23	22	21	111		
21	Bernard Yeoh (MAS)	21	23	22	19	25	110		
22	Eric Ang (PHI)	21	21	23	23	22	110		
23	Viktor Khassyanov (KAZ)	22	20	23	23	22	110		
24	Usman Sadiq (PAK)	23	22	22	22	21	110		
25	Lee Young-sik (KOR)	20	22	20	24	23	109		
26	Zain Amat (SIN)	21	22	21	22	23	109		
27	Song Nam-jun (KOR)	20	23	21	23	22	109		
28	Zoravar Singh Sandhu (IND)	19	22	23	24	21	109		
29	Rashid Hamad Al-Athba (QAT)	23	24	21	20	21	109		
30	Lee Wung Yew (SIN)	19	24	20	20	22	105		
31	Mohammed Al-Shrideh (KSA)	20	22	21	21	20	104		
32	Lê Nghĩa (VIE)	19	21	19	22	21	102		
33	Hamad Al-Athba (QAT)	19	21	20	22	19	101		
34	Anjum Shehzad Noor (PAK)	20	18	20	20	22	100		
35	Ong Chee Kheng (MAS)	17	19	23	21	18	98		
36	Aamer Iqbal (PAK)	20	21	18	20	18	97		
37	Pu Hsien-chung (TPE)	16	19	19	21	19	94		

=== Final ===
Rank	Athlete	Qual.	Final	Total	S-off	Notes
1st place, gold medalist(s)	Naser Al-Meqlad (IOC)	118	20	138		GR
2nd place, silver medalist(s)	Khaled Al-Mudhaf (IOC)	120	17	137		
3rd place, bronze medalist(s)	Joe Salem (LIB)	121	15	136	+2	
4	Abdo Al-Yazgie (LIB)	115	21	136	+1	
5	Manavjit Singh Sandhu (IND)	119	17	136	+0	
6	Savate Sresthaporn (THA)	116	13	129		
