= Shooting at the 2014 Asian Games – Men's trap =

Men's trap at the 2014 Asian Games
- Venue: Gyeonggido Shooting Range
- Dates: 20–21 September 2014
- Competitors: 46 from 20 nations

Medalists
| gold medal | Gao Bo | China |
| silver medal | Fehaid Al-Deehani | Kuwait |
| bronze medal | Andrey Mogilevskiy | Kazakhstan |

The men's trap competition at the 2014 Asian Games in Incheon, South Korea was held on 20 and 21 September at the Gyeonggido Shooting Range.

== Schedule ==
All times are Korea Standard Time (UTC+09:00)

| Date | Time | Event |
|---|---|---|
| Saturday, 20 September 2014 | 09:00 | Qualification day 1 |
| Sunday, 21 September 2014 | 09:00 | Qualification day 2 |
| Sunday, 21 September 2014 | 14:15 | Semifinal |
| Sunday, 21 September 2014 | 14:15 | Finals |

== Records ==
Prior to this competition, the existing world, Asian and Games records were as follows.

| World Record | Giovanni Pellielo (ITA) | 125 | Nicosia, Cyprus | 1 April 1994 |
| Asian Record | Khaled Al-Mudhaf (KUW) | 124 | Atlanta, United States | 14 May 1998 |
| Games Record | Fahad Al-Deehani (KUW) | 123 | Hiroshima, Japan | 8 October 1994 |

== Results ==
=== Qualification ===
| Rank | Athlete | Day 1 | | | Day 2 | | Total | S-off | Notes |
| Rank | Athlete | 1 | 2 | 3 | 4 | 5 | Total | S-off | Notes |
|---|---|---|---|---|---|---|---|---|---|
| 1 | Fehaid Al-Deehani (KUW) | 25 | 25 | 24 | 24 | 24 | 122 | | |
| 2 | Du Yu (CHN) | 24 | 24 | 24 | 24 | 24 | 120 | | |
| 3 | Walid El-Najjar (LIB) | 25 | 23 | 24 | 24 | 24 | 120 | | |
| 4 | Gao Bo (CHN) | 24 | 22 | 25 | 24 | 24 | 119 | | |
| 5 | Andrey Mogilevskiy (KAZ) | 25 | 24 | 25 | 21 | 24 | 119 | | |
| 6 | Hamad Al-Kendi (UAE) | 23 | 24 | 25 | 25 | 22 | 119 | | |
| 7 | Zhang Yiyao (CHN) | 23 | 24 | 21 | 25 | 25 | 118 | | |
| 8 | Jung Chang-hee (KOR) | 23 | 22 | 25 | 23 | 25 | 118 | | |
| 9 | Rashid Hamad Al-Athba (QAT) | 23 | 25 | 23 | 23 | 24 | 118 | | |
| 10 | Savate Sresthaporn (THA) | 22 | 25 | 24 | 21 | 25 | 117 | | |
| 11 | Mansher Singh (IND) | 21 | 23 | 25 | 24 | 24 | 117 | | |
| 12 | Abdulrahman Al-Faihan (KUW) | 24 | 24 | 24 | 23 | 22 | 117 | | |
| 13 | Huang I-chieh (TPE) | 23 | 23 | 23 | 24 | 23 | 116 | | |
| 14 | Manavjit Singh Sandhu (IND) | 24 | 23 | 25 | 21 | 23 | 116 | | |
| 15 | Alain Moussa (LIB) | 23 | 20 | 24 | 23 | 25 | 115 | | |
| 16 | Khaled Al-Mudhaf (KUW) | 23 | 22 | 24 | 22 | 24 | 115 | | |
| 17 | Zain Amat (SIN) | 25 | 22 | 23 | 22 | 23 | 115 | | |
| 18 | Lee Young-sik (KOR) | 22 | 23 | 22 | 23 | 24 | 114 | | |
| 19 | Viktor Khassyanov (KAZ) | 23 | 23 | 23 | 21 | 24 | 114 | | |
| 20 | Choo Choon Seng (SIN) | 23 | 23 | 23 | 22 | 23 | 114 | | |
| 21 | Mohammed Al-Afasi (UAE) | 22 | 22 | 23 | 25 | 22 | 114 | | |
| 22 | Mohammed Ali Khejaim (QAT) | 23 | 24 | 20 | 22 | 24 | 113 | | |
| 23 | Shigetaka Oyama (JPN) | 21 | 23 | 22 | 24 | 23 | 113 | | |
| 24 | Dlaim Al-Qahtani (KSA) | 25 | 19 | 22 | 24 | 23 | 113 | | |
| 25 | Babak Yeganeh (IRI) | 22 | 22 | 24 | 23 | 22 | 113 | | |
| 26 | Shin Hyun-woo (KOR) | 24 | 23 | 22 | 23 | 21 | 113 | | |
| 27 | Waleed Al-Eryani (UAE) | 20 | 23 | 21 | 24 | 24 | 112 | | |
| 28 | Hagen Topacio (PHI) | 22 | 21 | 22 | 23 | 24 | 112 | | |
| 29 | Shih Jung-hung (TPE) | 21 | 24 | 22 | 21 | 24 | 112 | | |
| 30 | Saleem Al-Nasri (OMA) | 22 | 23 | 21 | 23 | 21 | 110 | | |
| 31 | Aamer Iqbal (PAK) | 21 | 23 | 21 | 20 | 24 | 109 | | |
| 32 | Mohammed Al-Rumaihi (QAT) | 20 | 21 | 21 | 24 | 23 | 109 | | |
| 33 | Joe Salem (LIB) | 22 | 23 | 19 | 23 | 22 | 109 | | |
| 34 | Mohammed Al-Shrideh (KSA) | 22 | 23 | 20 | 22 | 22 | 109 | | |
| 35 | Fakhar-ul-Islam Qureshi (PAK) | 20 | 23 | 23 | 23 | 20 | 109 | | |
| 36 | Kynan Chenai (IND) | 23 | 23 | 19 | 21 | 22 | 108 | | |
| 37 | Eric Ang (PHI) | 21 | 21 | 21 | 24 | 21 | 108 | | |
| 38 | Maxim Kolomoyets (KAZ) | 20 | 23 | 22 | 19 | 23 | 107 | | |
| 39 | Tsai Yen-chen (TPE) | 21 | 20 | 22 | 24 | 20 | 107 | | |
| 40 | Usman Chand (PAK) | 21 | 23 | 22 | 20 | 20 | 106 | | |
| 41 | Quaysoor Miah (BAN) | 19 | 17 | 20 | 21 | 24 | 101 | | |
| 42 | Lê Nghĩa (VIE) | 20 | 17 | 20 | 20 | 24 | 101 | | |
| 43 | Dhawi Al-Harbi (KSA) | 21 | 21 | 16 | 21 | 22 | 101 | | |
| 44 | Shukhrat Khudayberdiev (UZB) | 19 | 24 | 22 | 16 | 20 | 101 | | |
| 45 | Georgiy Popov (UZB) | 20 | 16 | 21 | 22 | 21 | 100 | | |
| 46 | Sherzod Mamadjanov (UZB) | 19 | 14 | 20 | 19 | 15 | 87 | | |

=== Semifinal ===
| Rank | Athlete | Score | S-off |
|---|---|---|---|
| 1 | Fehaid Al-Deehani (KUW) | 14 | |
| 2 | Gao Bo (CHN) | 13 | |
| 3 | Walid El-Najjar (LIB) | 12 | |
| 4 | Andrey Mogilevskiy (KAZ) | 11 | |
| 5 | Du Yu (CHN) | 10 | |
| 6 | Hamad Al-Kendi (UAE) | 8 | |

=== Finals ===
==== Bronze medal match ====
| Rank | Athlete | Score | S-off |
|---|---|---|---|
| 3rd place, bronze medalist(s) | Andrey Mogilevskiy (KAZ) | 14 | |
| 4 | Walid El-Najjar (LIB) | 8 | |

==== Gold medal match ====
| Rank | Athlete | Score | S-off |
|---|---|---|---|
| 1st place, gold medalist(s) | Gao Bo (CHN) | 15 | |
| 2nd place, silver medalist(s) | Fehaid Al-Deehani (KUW) | 12 | |
