= Shooting at the 2006 Asian Games – Men's trap =

Men's trap at the 2006 Asian Games
- Venue: Lusail Shooting Range
- Dates: 2–3 December 2006
- Competitors: 34 from 15 nations

Medalists
gold medal	Naser Al-Meqlad	Kuwait
silver medal	Manavjit Singh Sandhu	India
bronze medal	Khaled Al-Mudhaf	Kuwait

The men's trap competition at the 2006 Asian Games in Doha, Qatar was held on 2 and 3 December at the Lusail Shooting Range.

== Schedule ==
All times are Arabia Standard Time (UTC+03:00)

Date	Time	Event
Saturday, 2 December 2006	08:00	Qualification day 1
Sunday, 3 December 2006	08:00	Qualification day 2
Sunday, 3 December 2006	12:00	Final

== Records ==
Prior to this competition, the existing world, Asian and Games records were as follows.

Qualification
World Record	Giovanni Pellielo (ITA)	125	Nicosia, Cyprus	1 April 1994
Asian Record	Khaled Al-Mudhaf (KUW)	124	Atlanta, United States	14 May 1998
Games Record	Fahad Al-Deehani (KUW)	123	Hiroshima, Japan	8 October 1994
Final
World Record	Aleksey Alipov (RUS)	147	Belgrade, Serbia & Montenegro	12 July 2005
Asian Record	Manavjit Singh Sandhu (IND)	143	Belgrade, Serbia & Montenegro	18 July 2005
Games Record	—	—	—	—

== Results ==
=== Qualification ===
Rank	Athlete	Day 1			Day 2		Total	S-off	Notes
Rank	Athlete	1	2	3	4	5	Total	S-off	Notes
1	Naser Al-Meqlad (KUW)	22	24	24	21	23	114		
2	Manavjit Singh Sandhu (IND)	23	23	24	22	21	113		
3	Amir Abri Lavasani (IRI)	19	25	23	21	23	111		
4	Jethro Dionisio (PHI)	23	19	24	21	23	110		
5	Anwer Sultan (IND)	22	21	22	23	22	110		
6	Khaled Al-Mudhaf (KUW)	20	23	21	23	21	108		
7	Lee Wung Yew (SIN)	21	20	24	21	21	107		
8	Talih Bou Kamel (LIB)	21	21	23	21	21	107		
9	Ivan Karpenko (KAZ)	24	23	20	20	20	107		
10	Joe Salem (LIB)	23	22	20	23	19	107		
11	Bernard Yeoh (MAS)	22	21	24	24	15	106		
12	Abdulrahman Al-Faihan (KUW)	21	22	19	24	19	105		
13	Zhang Bing (CHN)	22	22	24	21	16	105		
14	Lê Nghĩa (VIE)	23	23	17	20	21	104		
15	Joseph Hanna (LIB)	22	21	22	20	17	102		
16	Zain Amat (SIN)	19	20	21	21	20	101		
17	Choo Choon Seng (SIN)	20	20	23	19	19	101		
18	Hamad Al-Athba (QAT)	19	23	21	21	17	101		
19	Song Nam-jun (KOR)	23	21	21	20	16	101		
20	Eric Ang (PHI)	21	19	19	22	19	100		
21	Atig Kitcharoen (THA)	17	20	20	22	20	99		
22	Jaime Recio (PHI)	22	18	20	21	18	99		
23	Mansher Singh (IND)	21	24	17	19	18	99		
24	Ali Al-Kuwari (QAT)	21	21	21	21	15	99		
25	Lee Jong-suk (KOR)	22	16	20	21	19	98		
26	Li Yajun (CHN)	21	19	20	19	19	98		
27	Leong Wei Heng (MAS)	18	22	19	18	20	97		
28	Lee Young-sik (KOR)	18	23	20	19	17	97		
29	Hiroshi Susuki (JPN)	20	20	20	23	13	96		
30	Khalid Al-Dosari (QAT)	20	18	16	19	20	93		
31	Salaheddin Al-Khatib (SYR)	16	17	18	19	22	92		
32	Ng Beng Chong (MAS)	19	18	17	18	18	90		
33	Nguyễn Hoàng Điệp (VIE)	16	18	18	19	16	87		
34	Dương Anh Trung (VIE)	16	15	23	17	16	87		

=== Final ===
Rank	Athlete	Qual.	Final	Total	S-off	Notes
1st place, gold medalist(s)	Naser Al-Meqlad (KUW)	114	19	133		GR
2nd place, silver medalist(s)	Manavjit Singh Sandhu (IND)	113	17	130		
3rd place, bronze medalist(s)	Khaled Al-Mudhaf (KUW)	108	20	128		
4	Amir Abri Lavasani (IRI)	111	14	125	+3	
5	Jethro Dionisio (PHI)	110	15	125	+2	
6	Anwer Sultan (IND)	110	12	122		
