= Shooting at the 2026 Asian Games – Men's trap team =

Men's trap team at the 2026 Asian Games
- Venue: Aichi Prefectural General Shooting Gallery
- Dates: 27–29 September 2026
- Competitors: 30 from 10 nations

Medalists
gold medal	Kuwait; Khaled Al-Mudhaf, Talal Al-Rashidi, Abdulrahman Al-Faihan
silver medal	Qatar; Mohammed Al-Rumaihi, Angelo Scalzone, Saeed Abu Sharib
bronze medal	Kazakhstan; Daniil Pochivalov, Alisher Aisalbayev, Mark Pochivalov

The men's trap team competition in Shooting at the 2026 Asian Games was held from 27 to 29 September 2026 at the Aichi Prefectural General Shooting Gallery in Aichi Prefecture, Japan. The event was competed by 30 competitors from 10 nations. The Kuwaiti team consisting of Khaled Al-Mudhaf, Talal Al-Rashidi and Abdulrahman Al-Faihan, won the gold medal with a score of 355 points. Qatar won the silver medal with 349 points, while Kazakhstan won the bronze medal with 348 points.

== Background ==
Shooting was first introduced in the Asian Games programme at the 1954 edition at Manila, with trap shooting making its debut in the same edition. The men's trap team event made its debut at the 1974 Asian Games at Tehran.

India was the defending champion, having won the gold medal in the men's trap team event at the 2022 Asian Games in Hangzhou. The Indian team consisted of Zoravar Singh Sandhu, Kynan Chenai, and Prithviraj Tondaiman, who combined for a total score of 361, while setting a new Asian Games record. The Kuwait team, consisting of Abdulrahman Al-Faihan, Khaled Al-Mudhaf, and Talal Al-Rashidi, won the silver medal with 359 points, while the Chinese team, consisting of Guo Yuhao, Qi Ying, and Wang Yuhao, won the bronze medal with 354 points. Of the medalists from the previous Games, the Kuwaiti trio returned to compete in the 2026 Asian Games, while only Chenai and Qi Ying were part of their respective national teams for the 2026 edition.

The men's trap team event was not contested at the 2018 Asian Games in Jakarta, as team shooting events were removed from the competition programme. At the 2014 Asian Games in Incheon, China had won the gold medal, while Kuwait won the silver, and South Korea won the bronze. Historically Kuwait had been the most successful team, having won four gold medals.

In the 2025 Asian Shooting Championships held at Shymkent, the Kuwait team, comprising of Naser Almeqled, Al-Faihan, and Al-Rashidi, had won the gold medal with a score of 352 points. China's Qi Ying, Chen Pengyu and Yu Haicheng won the silver medal with 343 points, while Qatar's Angelo Scalzone, Mohammed Al-Rumaihi, and Saeed Abu Sharib won the bronze medal with 340 points. India and Kazakhstan finished fourth and fifth respectively.

== Schedule ==
The men's individual trap team event was held between 27 and 29 September 2026 held at the Aichi Prefectural General Shooting Gallery in Aichi Prefecture.

All times are Japan Standard Time (UTC+09:00)

Date	Time	Event
Sunday, 27 September 2026	10:00	Day 1
Monday, 28 September 2026	10:00	Day 2
Tuesday, 29 September 2026	10:00	Day 3

== Records ==
Prior to this competition, the existing world, Asian and Games records were as follows.

World Record	Italy	371	Osijek, Croatia	24 September 2023
Asian Record	Kuwait	368	Nicosia, Cyprus	6 September 2007
Games Record	India	361	Hangzhou, China	1 October 2023

== Summary ==
The event was competed by ten teams. Each team, consisting of three shooters. The score of each of the shooters from the five qualifying rounds for the individual men's trap event was totaled to determine the medal positions for the team event.

The Kuwait team, consisting of Al-Mudhaf, Al-Rashidi, and Al-Faihan, won the gold medal with a total score of 355 points. Al-Rashidi top scored with 120 points, followed by Al-Mudhaf with 119 points and Al-Faihan with 116 points. Kuwait held the lead at the end of each of the rounds to eventually secure the gold medal.

The Qatar team, consisting of Abu Sharib, Al-Rumaihi, and Scalzone won the silver medal with 349 points. Abu Sharib top scored with 119 points while Al-Rumaihi contributed 117 and Scalzone added 113 points. Kazakhstan claimed the bronze medal with 348 points. For the Kazakh team, Alisher Aisalbayev scored 117 points, Daniil Pochivalov added 116 points, and Mark Pochivalov contributed 115 points.

== Results ==
Rank	Team	Day 1			Day 2		Total	Notes
Rank	Team	1	2	3	4	5	Total	Notes
1st place, gold medalist(s)	Kuwait (KUW)	72	71	75	69	68	355	
	Khaled Al-Mudhaf	25	24	25	22	23	119	
	Talal Al-Rashidi	24	24	25	23	24	120	
	Abdulrahman Al-Faihan	23	23	25	24	21	116	
2nd place, silver medalist(s)	Qatar (QAT)	71	69	69	70	70	349	
	Mohammed Al-Rumaihi	24	24	22	23	24	117	
	Angelo Scalzone	23	23	23	22	22	113	
	Saeed Abusharib	24	22	24	25	24	119	
3rd place, bronze medalist(s)	Kazakhstan (KAZ)	68	70	71	69	70	348	
	Daniil Pochivalov	23	25	23	22	23	116	
	Alisher Aisalbayev	23	24	24	23	23	117	
	Mark Pochivalov	22	21	24	24	24	115	
4	China (CHN)	68	67	70	70	67	342	
	Qi Ying	24	25	24	24	25	122	
	Yu Haicheng	22	21	22	25	23	113	
	He Weidong	22	21	24	21	19	107	
5	Lebanon (LBN)	68	65	69	69	68	339	
	Ghassan Baaklini	25	21	23	24	23	116	
	Mario Kozhaya	22	23	23	21	23	112	
	Alain Moussa	21	21	23	24	22	111	
6	India (IND)	69	64	71	69	66	339	
	Kynan Chenai	25	22	22	22	24	115	
	Shapath Bharadwaj	24	21	25	25	22	117	
	Ahvar Rizvi	20	21	24	22	20	107	
7	Uzbekistan (UZB)	65	68	68	71	66	338	
	Azamat Kayumov	24	24	24	22	24	118	
	Okhunjon Abdukodirov	22	22	21	25	24	114	
	Timur Enaliev	19	22	23	24	18	106	
8	Philippines (PHI)	63	69	66	65	65	328	
	Eric Ang	24	24	21	21	19	109	
	Hagen Topacio	20	24	23	21	23	111	
	Antonio Joseph Javines	19	21	22	23	23	108	
9	Thailand (THA)	65	62	62	62	63	314	
	Savate Sresthaporn	22	24	22	21	22	111	
	Jintapat Hongchintakul	23	20	20	22	21	106	
	Yodchai Phachonyut	20	18	20	19	20	97	
10	Japan (JPN)	59	59	67	66	57	308	
	Michihide Tamura	20	22	22	23	18	105	
	Takuya Tamura	20	20	23	21	22	106	
	Hiroyuki Inoue	19	17	22	22	17	97	
