= Shooting at the 2010 Asian Games – Men's trap team =

Men's trap team at the 2010 Asian Games
- Venue: Guangzhou Shotgun Centre
- Dates: 18–19 November 2010
- Competitors: 33 from 11 nations

Medalists
gold medal	Athletes from Kuwait; Abdulrahman Al-Faihan, Naser Al-Meqlad, Khaled Al-Mudhaf
silver medal	Lebanon; Abdo Al-Yazgie, Joseph Hanna, Joe Salem
bronze medal	India; Manavjit Singh Sandhu, Zoravar Singh Sandhu, Mansher Singh

The men's trap team competition at the 2010 Asian Games in Guangzhou, China was held on 18 and 19 November at the Guangzhou Shotgun Centre.

== Schedule ==
All times are China Standard Time (UTC+08:00)

Date	Time	Event
Thursday, 18 November 2010	09:00	Day 1
Friday, 19 November 2010	09:00	Day 2

== Records ==
Prior to this competition, the existing world, Asian and Games records were as follows.

World Record	Italy	368	Nicosia, Cyprus	17 June 1995
Asian Record	Kuwait	368	Nicosia, Cyprus	6 September 2007
Games Record	Kuwait	357	Hiroshima, Japan	8 October 1994

== Results ==
Rank	Team	Day 1			Day 2		Total	Notes
Rank	Team	1	2	3	4	5	Total	Notes
1st place, gold medalist(s)	Athletes from Kuwait (IOC)	68	70	74	68	72	352	
	Abdulrahman Al-Faihan	20	24	25	22	23	114	
	Naser Al-Meqlad	23	24	24	23	24	118	
	Khaled Al-Mudhaf	25	22	25	23	25	120	
2nd place, silver medalist(s)	Lebanon (LIB)	71	72	70	72	66	351	
	Abdo Al-Yazgie	23	24	23	23	22	115	
	Joseph Hanna	24	24	22	25	20	115	
	Joe Salem	24	24	25	24	24	121	
3rd place, bronze medalist(s)	India (IND)	64	69	68	72	68	341	
	Manavjit Singh Sandhu	23	24	23	24	25	119	
	Zoravar Singh Sandhu	19	22	23	24	21	109	
	Mansher Singh	22	23	22	24	22	113	
4	China (CHN)	69	68	71	68	64	340	
	Li Yajun	23	22	23	22	21	111	
	Yu Xiaokai	22	23	24	23	22	114	
	Zhang Yongjie	24	23	24	23	21	115	
5	Philippines (PHI)	70	67	67	68	64	336	
	Eric Ang	21	21	23	23	22	110	
	Jethro Dionisio	25	23	19	22	24	113	
	Hagen Topacio	24	23	25	23	18	113	
6	Kazakhstan (KAZ)	70	61	69	67	68	335	
	Alexandr Gorun	25	19	24	21	22	111	
	Viktor Khassyanov	22	20	23	23	22	110	
	Andrey Mogilevskiy	23	22	22	23	24	114	
7	South Korea (KOR)	63	67	64	70	68	332	
	Jung Chang-hee	23	22	23	23	23	114	
	Lee Young-sik	20	22	20	24	23	109	
	Song Nam-jun	20	23	21	23	22	109	
8	Singapore (SIN)	62	68	64	66	67	327	
	Zain Amat	21	22	21	22	23	109	
	Choo Choon Seng	22	22	23	24	22	113	
	Lee Wung Yew	19	24	20	20	22	105	
9	Qatar (QAT)	63	67	64	64	65	323	
	Hamad Al-Athba	19	21	20	22	19	101	
	Rashid Hamad Al-Athba	23	24	21	20	21	109	
	Mohammed Al-Rumaihi	21	22	23	22	25	113	
10	Malaysia (MAS)	61	63	68	63	67	322	
	Chen Seong Fook	23	21	23	23	24	114	
	Ong Chee Kheng	17	19	23	21	18	98	
	Bernard Yeoh	21	23	22	19	25	110	
11	Pakistan (PAK)	63	61	60	62	61	307	
	Aamer Iqbal	20	21	18	20	18	97	
	Anjum Shehzad Noor	20	18	20	20	22	100	
	Usman Sadiq	23	22	22	22	21	110	
