= Shooting at the 2006 Asian Games – Men's trap team =

Men's trap at the 2006 Asian Games
- Venue: Lusail Shooting Range
- Dates: 2–3 December 2006
- Competitors: 27 from 9 nations

Medalists
gold medal	Kuwait; Abdulrahman Al-Faihan, Naser Al-Meqlad, Khaled Al-Mudhaf
silver medal	India; Manavjit Singh Sandhu, Mansher Singh, Anwer Sultan
bronze medal	Lebanon; Talih Bou Kamel, Joseph Hanna, Joe Salem

The men's trap team competition at the 2006 Asian Games in Doha, Qatar was held on 2 and 3 December at the Lusail Shooting Range.

== Schedule ==
All times are Arabia Standard Time (UTC+03:00)

Date	Time	Event
Saturday, 2 December 2006	08:00	Day 1
Sunday, 3 December 2006	08:00	Day 2

== Records ==
Prior to this competition, the existing world, Asian and Games records were as follows.

World Record	Italy	368	Nicosia, Cyprus	17 June 1995
Asian Record	China	364	Jakarta, Indonesia	4 October 1995
Games Record	Kuwait	357	Hiroshima, Japan	8 October 1994

== Results ==
Rank	Team	Day 1			Day 2		Total	Notes
Rank	Team	1	2	3	4	5	Total	Notes
1st place, gold medalist(s)	Kuwait (KUW)	63	69	64	68	63	327	
	Abdulrahman Al-Faihan	21	22	19	24	19	105	
	Naser Al-Meqlad	22	24	24	21	23	114	
	Khaled Al-Mudhaf	20	23	21	23	21	108	
2nd place, silver medalist(s)	India (IND)	66	68	63	64	61	322	
	Manavjit Singh Sandhu	23	23	24	22	21	113	
	Mansher Singh	21	24	17	19	18	99	
	Anwer Sultan	22	21	22	23	22	110	
3rd place, bronze medalist(s)	Lebanon (LIB)	66	64	65	64	57	316	
	Talih Bou Kamel	21	21	23	21	21	107	
	Joseph Hanna	22	21	22	20	17	102	
	Joe Salem	23	22	20	23	19	107	
4	Philippines (PHI)	66	56	63	64	60	309	
	Eric Ang	21	19	19	22	19	100	
	Jethro Dionisio	23	19	24	21	23	110	
	Jaime Recio	22	18	20	21	18	99	
5	Singapore (SIN)	60	60	68	61	60	309	
	Zain Amat	19	20	21	21	20	101	
	Choo Choon Seng	20	20	23	19	19	101	
	Lee Wung Yew	21	20	24	21	21	107	
6	South Korea (KOR)	63	60	61	60	52	296	
	Lee Jong-suk	22	16	20	21	19	98	
	Lee Young-sik	18	23	20	19	17	97	
	Song Nam-jun	23	21	21	20	16	101	
7	Malaysia (MAS)	59	61	60	60	53	293	
	Leong Wei Heng	18	22	19	18	20	97	
	Ng Beng Chong	19	18	17	18	18	90	
	Bernard Yeoh	22	21	24	24	15	106	
8	Qatar (QAT)	60	62	58	61	52	293	
	Hamad Al-Athba	19	23	21	21	17	101	
	Khalid Al-Dosari	20	18	16	19	20	93	
	Ali Al-Kuwari	21	21	21	21	15	99	
9	Vietnam (VIE)	55	56	58	56	53	278	
	Dương Anh Trung	16	15	23	17	16	87	
	Lê Nghĩa	23	23	17	20	21	104	
	Nguyễn Hoàng Điệp	16	18	18	19	16	87	
