= Shooting at the 2022 Asian Games – Men's trap =

Men's trap at the 2022 Asian Games
- Venue: Fuyang Yinhu Sports Centre
- Dates: 30 September – 1 October 2023
- Competitors: 41 from 17 nations

Medalists
gold medal	Qi Ying	China
silver medal	Talal Al-Rashidi	Kuwait
bronze medal	Kynan Chenai	India

The men's trap competition at the 2022 Asian Games in Hangzhou, China was held on 30 September and 1 October 2023 at Fuyang Yinhu Sports Centre.

== Schedule ==
All times are China Standard Time (UTC+08:00)

Date	Time	Event
Saturday, 30 September 2023	09:00	Qualification day 1
Sunday, 1 October 2023	09:00	Qualification day 2
Sunday, 1 October 2023	16:00	Final

== Records ==
Prior to this competition, the existing world, Asian and Games records were as follows.

Qualification
World Record	Giovanni Pellielo (ITA)	125	Nicosia, Cyprus	1 April 1994
Asian Record	Khaled Al-Mudhaf (KUW)	124	Atlanta, United States	14 May 1998
Games Record	Fahad Al-Deehani (KUW)	123	Hiroshima, Japan	8 October 1994
Final
World Record	Nathan Hales (GBR)	49	Lonato, Italy	16 July 2023
Asian Record	Yang Kun-pi (TPE)	48	Palembang, Indonesia	20 August 2018
Games Record	Yang Kun-pi (TPE)	48	Palembang, Indonesia	20 August 2018

== Results ==
=== Qualification ===
Rank	Athlete	Day 1			Day 2		Total	S-off	Notes
Rank	Athlete	1	2	3	4	5	Total	S-off	Notes
1	Kynan Chenai (IND)	25	23	25	24	25	122		
2	Zoravar Singh Sandhu (IND)	25	23	24	25	23	120	+10	
3	Talal Al-Rashidi (KUW)	24	25	24	23	24	120	+9	
4	Khaled Al-Mudhaf (KUW)	24	24	24	25	23	120	+2	
5	Mohammed Al-Rumaihi (QAT)	23	24	24	25	24	120	+0	
6	Qi Ying (CHN)	25	22	24	24	24	119	+18	
7	Alisher Aisalbayev (KAZ)	25	23	24	24	23	119	+17	
8	Alain Moussa (LBN)	22	24	24	24	25	119	+5	
9	Ahn Dae-myeong (KOR)	23	24	24	23	25	119	+5	
10	Yang Kun-pi (TPE)	24	25	22	25	23	119	+2	
11	Prithviraj Tondaiman (IND)	24	23	23	25	24	119		
12	Abdulrahman Al-Faihan (KUW)	24	24	24	24	23	119		
13	Wang Yuhao (CHN)	24	23	23	23	25	118		
14	Kim Su-yeong (KOR)	25	23	24	23	23	118		
15	Saeed Abusharib (QAT)	22	22	24	25	24	117		
16	Mohammad Beiranvand (IRI)	23	23	24	23	24	117		
17	Guo Yuhao (CHN)	24	24	23	22	24	117		
18	Hagen Topacio (PHI)	24	25	25	22	21	117		
19	Daniil Pochivalov (KAZ)	22	23	21	25	25	116		
20	Chuang Han-lin (TPE)	22	21	24	25	24	116		
21	Maxim Bedarev (KAZ)	24	23	22	23	24	116		
22	Rashid Hamad Al-Athba (QAT)	23	24	22	24	23	116		
23	Walid El-Najjar (LBN)	24	24	23	22	23	116		
24	Fahad Al-Mutairi (KSA)	25	22	24	23	22	116		
25	Carlos Carag (PHI)	24	23	22	25	20	114		
26	Bernard Yeoh (MAS)	24	22	23	23	21	113		
27	Yahya Al-Mheiri (UAE)	24	22	23	19	24	112		
28	Jung Chang-hee (KOR)	21	23	23	23	22	112		
29	Nguyễn Hoàng Điệp (VIE)	22	22	22	22	23	111		
30	Mohammed Al-Shrideh (KSA)	23	22	22	24	20	111		
31	Chen Kuei-peng (TPE)	23	22	22	21	22	110		
32	Elie Bejjani (LBN)	22	22	24	20	22	110		
33	Savate Sresthaporn (THA)	22	23	23	22	20	110		
34	Ahmad Al-Trabeishi (JOR)	24	20	24	21	20	109		
35	Lê Nghĩa (VIE)	19	21	21	24	23	108		
36	Waleed Al-Eryani (UAE)	23	22	22	20	21	108		
37	Saeed Hasan (BRN)	23	21	22	19	22	107		
38	Eric Ang (PHI)	20	21	21	24	21	107		
39	Yodchai Phachonyut (THA)	22	23	17	19	21	102		
40	Faisal Al-Dajani (KSA)	19	16	21	20	21	97		
41	Fuad Al-Madi (JOR)	18	19	19	21	20	97		

=== Final ===
Rank	Athlete	1st stage				2nd stage – Elimination						S-off	Notes
Rank	Athlete	1	2	3	4	1	2	3	4	5	6	S-off	Notes
1st place, gold medalist(s)	Qi Ying (CHN)	3	8	13	18	23	27	31	36	41	46		
2nd place, silver medalist(s)	Talal Al-Rashidi (KUW)	5	10	15	20	23	28	32	37	40	45		
3rd place, bronze medalist(s)	Kynan Chenai (IND)	4	8	13	18	22	25	29	32				
4	Mohammed Al-Rumaihi (QAT)	4	9	13	18	22	26	29					
5	Zoravar Singh Sandhu (IND)	4	8	12	17	21	23						
6	Khaled Al-Mudhaf (KUW)	5	10	13	18	21							
