= Shooting at the 2014 Asian Games – Men's trap team =

Men's trap team at the 2014 Asian Games
- Venue: Gyeonggido Shooting Range
- Dates: 20–21 September 2014
- Competitors: 36 from 12 nations

Medalists
gold medal	China; Du Yu, Gao Bo, Zhang Yiyao
silver medal	Kuwait; Fehaid Al-Deehani, Abdulrahman Al-Faihan, Khaled Al-Mudhaf
bronze medal	South Korea; Jung Chang-hee, Lee Young-sik, Shin Hyun-woo

The men's trap team competition at the 2014 Asian Games in Incheon, South Korea was held on 20 and 21 September at the Gyeonggido Shooting Range.

== Schedule ==
All times are Korea Standard Time (UTC+09:00)

Date	Time	Event
Saturday, 20 September 2014	09:00	Day 1
Sunday, 21 September 2014	09:00	Day 2

== Records ==
Prior to this competition, the existing world, Asian and Games records were as follows.

World Record	Italy	369	Belgrade, Serbia	6 September 2011
Asian Record	Kuwait	368	Nicosia, Cyprus	6 September 2007
Games Record	Kuwait	357	Hiroshima, Japan	8 October 1994

== Results ==
Rank	Team	Day 1			Day 2		Total	Notes
Rank	Team	1	2	3	4	5	Total	Notes
1st place, gold medalist(s)	China (CHN)	71	70	70	73	73	357	
	Du Yu	24	24	24	24	24	120	
	Gao Bo	24	22	25	24	24	119	
	Zhang Yiyao	23	24	21	25	25	118	
2nd place, silver medalist(s)	Kuwait (KUW)	72	71	72	69	70	354	
	Fehaid Al-Deehani	25	25	24	24	24	122	
	Abdulrahman Al-Faihan	24	24	24	23	22	117	
	Khaled Al-Mudhaf	23	22	24	22	24	115	
3rd place, bronze medalist(s)	South Korea (KOR)	69	68	69	69	70	345	
	Jung Chang-hee	23	22	25	23	25	118	
	Lee Young-sik	22	23	22	23	24	114	
	Shin Hyun-woo	24	23	22	23	21	113	
4	United Arab Emirates (UAE)	65	69	69	74	68	345	
	Mohammed Al-Afasi	22	22	23	25	22	114	
	Waleed Al-Eryani	20	23	21	24	24	112	
	Hamad Al-Kendi	23	24	25	25	22	119	
5	Lebanon (LIB)	70	66	67	70	71	344	
	Walid El-Najjar	25	23	24	24	24	120	
	Alain Moussa	23	20	24	23	25	115	
	Joe Salem	22	23	19	23	22	109	
6	India (IND)	68	69	69	66	69	341	
	Kynan Chenai	23	23	19	21	22	108	
	Manavjit Singh Sandhu	24	23	25	21	23	116	
	Mansher Singh	21	23	25	24	24	117	
7	Qatar (QAT)	66	70	64	69	71	340	
	Rashid Hamad Al-Athba	23	25	23	23	24	118	
	Mohammed Al-Rumaihi	20	21	21	24	23	109	
	Mohammed Ali Khejaim	23	24	20	22	24	113	
8	Kazakhstan (KAZ)	68	70	70	61	71	340	
	Viktor Khassyanov	23	23	23	21	24	114	
	Maxim Kolomoyets	20	23	22	19	23	107	
	Andrey Mogilevskiy	25	24	25	21	24	119	
9	Chinese Taipei (TPE)	65	67	67	69	67	335	
	Huang I-chieh	23	23	23	24	23	116	
	Shih Jung-hung	21	24	22	21	24	112	
	Tsai Yen-chen	21	20	22	24	20	107	
10	Pakistan (PAK)	62	69	66	63	64	324	
	Usman Chand	21	23	22	20	20	106	
	Aamer Iqbal	21	23	21	20	24	109	
	Fakhar-ul-Islam Qureshi	20	23	23	23	20	109	
11	Saudi Arabia (KSA)	68	63	58	67	67	323	
	Dhawi Al-Harbi	21	21	16	21	22	101	
	Dlaim Al-Qahtani	25	19	22	24	23	113	
	Mohammed Al-Shrideh	22	23	20	22	22	109	
12	Uzbekistan (UZB)	58	54	63	57	56	288	
	Shukhrat Khudayberdiev	19	24	22	16	20	101	
	Sherzod Mamadjanov	19	14	20	19	15	87	
	Georgiy Popov	20	16	21	22	21	100	
