= Shooting at the 2002 Asian Games – Men's trap =

Men's trap at the 2002 Asian Games
- Venue: Changwon International Shooting Range
- Dates: 2–3 October 2002
- Competitors: 33 from 13 nations

Medalists
| gold medal | Li Hui | China |
| silver medal | Zhang Yongjie | China |
| bronze medal | Jethro Dionisio | Philippines |

The men's trap competition at the 2002 Asian Games in Busan, South Korea was held on 2 and 3 October at the Changwon International Shooting Range.

== Schedule ==
All times are Korea Standard Time (UTC+09:00)

| Date | Time | Event |
|---|---|---|
| Wednesday, 2 October 2002 | 09:30 | Qualification day 1 |
| Thursday, 3 October 2002 | 09:30 | Qualification day 2 |
| Thursday, 3 October 2002 | 16:00 | Final |

== Records ==
Prior to this competition, the existing world, Asian and Games records were as follows.

Qualification
| World Record | Giovanni Pellielo (ITA) | 125 | Nicosia, Cyprus | 1 April 1994 |
| Asian Record | Khaled Al-Mudhaf (KUW) | 124 | Atlanta, United States | 14 May 1998 |
| Games Record | Fahad Al-Deehani (KUW) | 123 | Hiroshima, Japan | 8 October 1994 |
Final
| World Record | Marcello Tittarelli (ITA) | 150 | Suhl, Germany | 11 June 1996 |
| Asian Record | Zhang Bing (CHN) | 149 | Jakarta, Indonesia | 4 October 1995 |
| Games Record | Zhang Bing (CHN) | 144 | Hiroshima, Japan | 8 October 1994 |

== Results ==
=== Qualification ===
| Rank | Athlete | Day 1 | | | Day 2 | | Total | S-off | Notes |
| Rank | Athlete | 1 | 2 | 3 | 4 | 5 | Total | S-off | Notes |
|---|---|---|---|---|---|---|---|---|---|
| 1 | Zhang Yongjie (CHN) | 23 | 25 | 23 | 24 | 24 | 119 | | |
| 2 | Li Hui (CHN) | 23 | 23 | 23 | 25 | 24 | 118 | | |
| 3 | Jethro Dionisio (PHI) | 22 | 25 | 24 | 23 | 23 | 117 | | |
| 4 | Huang Lixin (CHN) | 22 | 24 | 24 | 24 | 22 | 116 | | |
| 5 | Mansher Singh (IND) | 23 | 23 | 22 | 25 | 22 | 115 | +2 | |
| 6 | Manavjit Singh Sandhu (IND) | 22 | 22 | 23 | 24 | 24 | 115 | +1 | |
| 7 | Atsushi Otake (JPN) | 22 | 23 | 24 | 24 | 22 | 115 | +0 | |
| 8 | Ahmed Al-Maktoum (UAE) | 22 | 23 | 23 | 24 | 22 | 114 | | |
| 9 | Chen Wei-tao (TPE) | 22 | 23 | 25 | 20 | 23 | 113 | | |
| 10 | Yousef Al-Mannaei (KUW) | 21 | 23 | 23 | 23 | 21 | 111 | | |
| 10 | Khaled Al-Mudhaf (KUW) | 23 | 24 | 22 | 21 | 21 | 111 | | |
| 12 | Anwer Sultan (IND) | 23 | 23 | 20 | 21 | 23 | 110 | | |
| 13 | Eric Ang (PHI) | 19 | 21 | 22 | 23 | 24 | 109 | | |
| 13 | Byun Kyung-soo (KOR) | 19 | 20 | 24 | 23 | 23 | 109 | | |
| 13 | Fahad Al-Deehani (KUW) | 24 | 21 | 23 | 22 | 19 | 109 | | |
| 16 | Hsu Ching-huang (TPE) | 22 | 20 | 21 | 21 | 23 | 107 | | |
| 16 | O Hae-ryong (PRK) | 19 | 24 | 23 | 21 | 20 | 107 | | |
| 18 | Tsai Wen-chieh (TPE) | 23 | 20 | 18 | 23 | 22 | 106 | | |
| 18 | Joe Salem (LIB) | 24 | 20 | 22 | 20 | 20 | 106 | | |
| 20 | Jaime Recio (PHI) | 19 | 18 | 22 | 22 | 24 | 105 | | |
| 20 | Pae Won-guk (PRK) | 22 | 20 | 22 | 23 | 18 | 105 | | |
| 22 | Saif Al-Shamsi (UAE) | 20 | 24 | 16 | 21 | 23 | 104 | | |
| 22 | Abdulla Al-Kendi (UAE) | 21 | 24 | 22 | 17 | 20 | 104 | | |
| 24 | Ahmed Al-Rumaihi (QAT) | 21 | 22 | 19 | 22 | 19 | 103 | | |
| 25 | Lee Jong-suk (KOR) | 21 | 20 | 17 | 22 | 21 | 101 | | |
| 26 | Ali Al-Kuwari (QAT) | 18 | 18 | 21 | 21 | 21 | 99 | | |
| 27 | Ri Nam-ik (PRK) | 20 | 15 | 21 | 22 | 19 | 97 | | |
| 28 | Usman Sadiq (PAK) | 23 | 17 | 19 | 19 | 18 | 96 | | |
| 29 | Munir Hussain (PAK) | 16 | 20 | 17 | 23 | 18 | 94 | | |
| 30 | Saleem Al-Nasri (OMA) | 21 | 17 | 16 | 17 | 22 | 93 | | |
| 31 | Song Nam-jun (KOR) | 17 | 17 | 16 | 17 | 20 | 87 | | |
| 31 | Sultan Mahmood (PAK) | 22 | 16 | 15 | 17 | 17 | 87 | | |
| 33 | Abdulla Al-Kuwari (QAT) | 19 | 17 | 18 | 16 | 16 | 86 | | |

=== Final ===
| Rank | Athlete | Qual. | Final | Total | S-off | Notes |
|---|---|---|---|---|---|---|
| 1st place, gold medalist(s) | Li Hui (CHN) | 118 | 25 | 143 | | |
| 2nd place, silver medalist(s) | Zhang Yongjie (CHN) | 119 | 23 | 142 | | |
| 3rd place, bronze medalist(s) | Jethro Dionisio (PHI) | 117 | 22 | 139 | | |
| 4 | Huang Lixin (CHN) | 116 | 22 | 138 | | |
| 5 | Mansher Singh (IND) | 115 | 22 | 137 | | |
| 6 | Manavjit Singh Sandhu (IND) | 115 | 21 | 136 | | |
