= Shooting at the 2026 Asian Games – Men's trap =

Men's trap at the 2026 Asian Games
- Venue: Aichi Prefectural General Shooting Gallery
- Dates: 27–29 September 2026
- Competitors: 41 from 19 nations

Medalists
gold medal	Khaled Al-Mudhaf	Kuwait
silver medal	Yang Kun-pi	Chinese Taipei
bronze medal	Qi Ying	China

The men's trap competition in Shooting at the 2026 Asian Games was held from 27 to 29 September 2026 at the Aichi Prefectural General Shooting Gallery in Aichi Prefecture, Japan. The event was competed by 41 competitors from 19 nations. Khaled Al-Mudhaf of Kuwait won the gold medal, while Yang Kun-pi of Chinese Taipei and Qi Ying of China won the silver and bronze medals respectively.

== Background ==
Shooting was first introduced in the Asian Games programme at the 1954 edition at Manila, with trap shooting making its debut in the same edition. Shooting has been part of every Asian Games since then.

China's Qi Ying was the defending champion, having won the gold medal in the men's trap event at the 2022 Asian Games in Hangzhou. Kuwait's Talal Al-Rashidi won the silver medal, while India's Kynan Chenai had won the bronze medal. All three of the medalists from the previous Games were part of the competition roster at the 2026 Asian Games.

Qi was the top ranked trap shooter in the world, and had won the silver medal at the 2024 Summer Olympics in Paris in the men's trap event, finishing behind Britain's Nathan Hales. He had also won the gold medal at the 2023 and the 2025 Asian Shooting Championships, and the 2024 ISSF World Cup finals. Chinese Taipei's Yang Kun-pi had won the gold medal in the men's trap event at the 2018 Asian Games in Jakarta. He had also won the bronze medal at the 2022 ISSF World Shooting Championships in Osijek and taken part in three Summer Olympics.

Kuwait's Khaled Al-Mudhaf had represented his nation at four Summer Olympics since 2000. He had won the gold medal at the 2002 ISSF World Shooting Championships and bronze medals at the 2019 and 2023 ISSF World Shooting Championships. At the 2000 Summer Olympics in Sydney, he had finished fourth in the men's trap event. He had also won a silver medal at the 2010 Asian Games and a bronze medal at the 2006 Asian Games.

Al-Rashidi, the silver medalist from the previous edition, had won the gold medal at the 2011 ISSF Junior World Championships and the 2019 Asian Shooting Championships in Doha. Chenai, the bronze medallist at the 2022 Asian Games, had won a bronze medal in the 2017 Asian Shooting Championships and represented India at the 2016 Summer Olympics. Other competitors included India's Shapath Bharadwaj, who won the gold medal in the men's junior trap team event at the 2023 ISSF Junior World Championships, and Uzbekistan's Azamat Kayumov, who finished sixth in the junior category at the 2024 Asiang Shooting Championships.

== Schedule ==
The men's individual trap event was held between 27 and 29 September 2026 held at the Aichi Prefectural General Shooting Gallery in Aichi Prefecture.

All times are Japan Standard Time (UTC+09:00)

Date	Time	Event
Sunday, 27 September 2026	10:00	Qualification day 1
Monday, 28 September 2026	10:00	Qualification day 2
Tuesday, 29 September 2026	10:00	Qualification day 3
Tuesday, 29 September 2026	15:30	Final

== Records ==
Prior to this competition, the existing world, Asian and Games records were as follows.

Qualification
World Record	Giovanni Pellielo (ITA)	125	Nicosia, Cyprus	1 April 1994
Asian Record	Khaled Al-Mudhaf (KUW)	124	Atlanta, United States	14 May 1998
Games Record	Fahad Al-Deehani (KUW)	123	Hiroshima, Japan	8 October 1994
Final
World Record	Erminio Frasca (ITA)	30	Lonato, Italy	11 July 2026
Asian Record	Muhammad Farrukh Nadeem (PAK)	27	Doha, Qatar	20 January 2026
Games Record	—	—	—	—

== Summary ==
The event was competed by 41 competitors from 19 nations. The top eight competitors from the qualification rounds advance to the finals. The qualification rounds consisted of five rounds of 25 shots each held over two days. Yang Kun-pi topped the qualification round with a score of 123 out of 125 targets, equaling the Asian Games qualification record. Qi Ying finished second with 122, while Alrashidi placed third with a score of 120. Saeed Abusharib of Qatar won a shoot-off against Al-Mudhaf for the fourth place after being tied at 119 points, and Kayumov finished sixth. Alisher Aisalbayev of Kazakhstan and Bharadwaj took the last two qualifying places after being involved in a three men shoot-off with Qatar's Mohammed Al-Rumaihi.

In the final, two of the least placed competitors were eliminated after the first two rounds consisting of five shots each, which were Aisalbayev and Bharadwaj. Two more were eliminated after the next round, which included Abu Sharib and Al-Rashidi with 11 points each. Kayumov was eliminated after the next round with a score of 15 points. Qi Ying secured the bronze with 20 points before the final round where Al-Mudhaf and Kun-pi were the remaining contestants. Both of them shot four out of five targets in the final round. However, Al-Mudhaf won the gold medal with a total score of 26 points and set a new Asian Games record, while Yang Kun-pi won the silver medal with 25 points.

== Results ==
=== Qualification ===
Rank	Athlete	Day 1			Day 2		Total	S-off	Notes
Rank	Athlete	1	2	3	4	5	Total	S-off	Notes
1	Yang Kun-pi (TPE)	24	24	25	25	25	123		Q
2	Qi Ying (CHN)	24	25	24	24	25	122		Q
3	Talal Al-Rashidi (KUW)	24	24	25	23	24	120		Q
4	Saeed Abu Sharib (QAT)	24	22	24	25	24	119	+1	Q
5	Khaled Al-Mudhaf (KUW)	25	24	25	22	23	119	+0	Q
6	Azamat Kayumov (UZB)	24	24	24	22	24	118		Q
7	Alisher Aisalbayev (KAZ)	23	24	24	23	23	117	+2	Q
8	Shapath Bharadwaj (IND)	24	21	25	25	22	117	+1	Q
9	Mohammed Al-Rumaihi (QAT)	24	24	22	23	24	117	+0	
10	Bati Humaid Ali Al-Shibli (OMA)	22	23	25	22	24	116		
11	Ghassan Baaklini (LBN)	25	21	23	24	23	116		
12	Daniil Pochivalov (KAZ)	23	25	23	22	23	116		
13	Abdulrahman Al-Faihan (KUW)	23	23	25	24	21	116		
14	Mohammad Beiranvand (IRI)	22	24	20	25	24	115		
15	Mark Pochivalov (KAZ)	22	21	24	24	24	115		
16	Kynan Chenai (IND)	25	22	22	22	24	115		
17	Okhunjon Abdukodirov (UZB)	22	22	21	25	24	114		
18	Ahn Dae-myeong (KOR)	23	22	23	25	21	114		
19	Yu Haicheng (CHN)	22	21	22	25	23	113		
20	Angelo Scalzone (QAT)	23	23	23	22	22	113		
21	Mohammed Al-Maktoum (UAE)	24	24	23	24	18	113		
22	Andreas Yunus Boki (INA)	22	22	21	23	24	112		
23	Mario Kozhaya (LBN)	22	23	23	21	23	112		
24	Yahya Al-Mheiri (UAE)	23	21	22	24	22	112		
25	Hagen Topacio (PHI)	20	24	23	21	23	111		
26	Alain Moussa (LBN)	21	21	23	24	22	111		
27	Savate Sresthaporn (THA)	22	24	22	21	22	111		
28	Saeed Hasan (BRN)	23	22	22	20	22	109		
29	Eric Ang (PHI)	24	24	21	21	19	109		
30	Antonio Joseph Javines (PHI)	19	21	22	23	23	108		
31	Bagus Sholeh Aristyawan (INA)	23	20	19	22	23	107		
32	Ahvar Rizvi (IND)	20	21	24	22	20	107		
33	He Weidong (CHN)	22	21	24	21	19	107		
34	Takuya Tamura (JPN)	20	20	23	21	22	106		
35	Jintapat Hongchintakul (THA)	23	20	20	22	21	106		
36	Timur Enaliev (UZB)	19	22	23	24	18	106		
37	Michihide Tamura (JPN)	20	22	22	23	18	105		
38	Yodchai Phachonyut (THA)	20	18	20	19	20	97		
39	Hiroyuki Inoue (JPN)	19	17	22	22	17	97		
40	Wssam Jafaar (SYR)	20	18	19	19	16	92		
—	Muhammad Farrukh Nadeem (PAK)	DNS						DNS	

Rank	Athlete	1st stage		2nd stage – Elimination				S-off	Notes
Rank	Athlete	1	2	3	4	5	6	S-off	Notes
1st place, gold medalist(s)	Khaled Al-Mudhaf (KUW)	3	5	4	5	4	26		GR
2nd place, silver medalist(s)	Yang Kun-pi (TPE)	4	4	5	4	4	25		
3rd place, bronze medalist(s)	Qi Ying (CHN)	4	4	5	4	20			
4	Azamat Kayumov (UZB)	4	4	4	15				
5	Talal Al-Rashidi (KUW)	4	4	11					
6	Saeed Abu Sharib (QAT)	3	4	11					
7	Alisher Aisalbayev (KAZ)	4	7						
8	Shapath Bharadwaj (IND)	3	7						
