= Shooting at the 2002 Asian Games – Men's trap team =

Men's trap team at the 2002 Asian Games
- Venue: Changwon International Shooting Range
- Dates: 2–3 October 2002
- Competitors: 30 from 10 nations

Medalists
| gold medal | China; Huang Lixin, Li Hui, Zhang Yongjie |
| silver medal | India; Manavjit Singh Sandhu, Mansher Singh, Anwer Sultan |
| bronze medal | Philippines; Eric Ang, Jethro Dionisio, Jaime Recio |

The men's trap team competition at the 2002 Asian Games in Busan, South Korea was held on 2 and 3 October at the Changwon International Shooting Range.

== Schedule ==
All times are Korea Standard Time (UTC+09:00)

| Date | Time | Event |
|---|---|---|
| Wednesday, 2 October 2002 | 09:30 | Day 1 |
| Thursday, 3 October 2002 | 09:30 | Day 2 |

== Records ==
Prior to this competition, the existing world, Asian and Games records were as follows.

| World Record | Italy | 368 | Nicosia, Cyprus | 17 June 1995 |
| Asian Record | China | 364 | Jakarta, Indonesia | 4 October 1995 |
| Games Record | Kuwait | 357 | Hiroshima, Japan | 8 October 1994 |

== Results ==
| Rank | Team | Day 1 | | | Day 2 | | Total | Notes |
| Rank | Team | 1 | 2 | 3 | 4 | 5 | Total | Notes |
|---|---|---|---|---|---|---|---|---|
| 1st place, gold medalist(s) | China (CHN) | 68 | 72 | 70 | 73 | 70 | 353 | |
| | Huang Lixin | 22 | 24 | 24 | 24 | 22 | 116 | |
| | Li Hui | 23 | 23 | 23 | 25 | 24 | 118 | |
| | Zhang Yongjie | 23 | 25 | 23 | 24 | 24 | 119 | |
| 2nd place, silver medalist(s) | India (IND) | 68 | 68 | 65 | 70 | 69 | 340 | |
| | Manavjit Singh Sandhu | 22 | 22 | 23 | 24 | 24 | 115 | |
| | Mansher Singh | 23 | 23 | 22 | 25 | 22 | 115 | |
| | Anwer Sultan | 23 | 23 | 20 | 21 | 23 | 110 | |
| 3rd place, bronze medalist(s) | Philippines (PHI) | 60 | 64 | 68 | 68 | 71 | 331 | |
| | Eric Ang | 19 | 21 | 22 | 23 | 24 | 109 | |
| | Jethro Dionisio | 22 | 25 | 24 | 23 | 23 | 117 | |
| | Jaime Recio | 19 | 18 | 22 | 22 | 24 | 105 | |
| 4 | Kuwait (KUW) | 68 | 68 | 68 | 66 | 61 | 331 | |
| | Fahad Al-Deehani | 24 | 21 | 23 | 22 | 19 | 109 | |
| | Yousef Al-Mannaei | 21 | 23 | 23 | 23 | 21 | 111 | |
| | Khaled Al-Mudhaf | 23 | 24 | 22 | 21 | 21 | 111 | |
| 5 | Chinese Taipei (TPE) | 67 | 63 | 64 | 64 | 68 | 326 | |
| | Chen Wei-tao | 22 | 23 | 25 | 20 | 23 | 113 | |
| | Hsu Ching-huang | 22 | 20 | 21 | 21 | 23 | 107 | |
| | Tsai Wen-chieh | 23 | 20 | 18 | 23 | 22 | 106 | |
| 6 | United Arab Emirates (UAE) | 63 | 71 | 61 | 62 | 65 | 322 | |
| | Abdulla Al-Kendi | 21 | 24 | 22 | 17 | 20 | 104 | |
| | Ahmed Al-Maktoum | 22 | 23 | 23 | 24 | 22 | 114 | |
| | Saif Al-Shamsi | 20 | 24 | 16 | 21 | 23 | 104 | |
| 7 | North Korea (PRK) | 61 | 59 | 66 | 66 | 57 | 309 | |
| | O Hae-ryong | 19 | 24 | 23 | 21 | 20 | 107 | |
| | Pae Won-guk | 22 | 20 | 22 | 23 | 18 | 105 | |
| | Ri Nam-ik | 20 | 15 | 21 | 22 | 19 | 97 | |
| 8 | South Korea (KOR) | 57 | 57 | 57 | 62 | 64 | 297 | |
| | Byun Kyung-soo | 19 | 20 | 24 | 23 | 23 | 109 | |
| | Lee Jong-suk | 21 | 20 | 17 | 22 | 21 | 101 | |
| | Song Nam-jun | 17 | 17 | 16 | 17 | 20 | 87 | |
| 9 | Qatar (QAT) | 58 | 57 | 58 | 59 | 56 | 288 | |
| | Abdulla Al-Kuwari | 19 | 17 | 18 | 16 | 16 | 86 | |
| | Ali Al-Kuwari | 18 | 18 | 21 | 21 | 21 | 99 | |
| | Ahmed Al-Rumaihi | 21 | 22 | 19 | 22 | 19 | 103 | |
| 10 | Pakistan (PAK) | 61 | 53 | 51 | 59 | 53 | 277 | |
| | Munir Hussain | 16 | 20 | 17 | 23 | 18 | 94 | |
| | Sultan Mahmood | 22 | 16 | 15 | 17 | 17 | 87 | |
| | Usman Sadiq | 23 | 17 | 19 | 19 | 18 | 96 | |
