= Shooting at the 2022 Asian Games – Men's trap team =

Men's trap team at the 2022 Asian Games
- Venue: Fuyang Yinhu Sports Centre
- Dates: 30 September – 1 October 2023
- Competitors: 30 from 10 nations

Medalists
gold medal	India; Kynan Chenai, Zoravar Singh Sandhu, Prithviraj Tondaiman
silver medal	Kuwait; Abdulrahman Al-Faihan, Khaled Al-Mudhaf, Talal Al-Rashidi
bronze medal	China; Guo Yuhao, Qi Ying, Wang Yuhao

The men's trap team competition at the 2022 Asian Games in Hangzhou, China was held on 30 September and 1 October 2023 at Fuyang Yinhu Sports Centre.

== Schedule ==
All times are China Standard Time (UTC+08:00)

Date	Time	Event
Saturday, 30 September 2023	09:00	Day 1
Sunday, 1 October 2023	09:00	Day 2

== Records ==
Prior to this competition, the existing world, Asian and Games records were as follows.

World Record	Italy	369	Belgrade, Serbia	6 September 2011
Asian Record	Kuwait	368	Nicosia, Cyprus	6 September 2007
Games Record	Kuwait	357	Hiroshima, Japan	8 October 1994

== Results ==
Rank	Team	Day 1			Day 2		Total	Notes
Rank	Team	1	2	3	4	5	Total	Notes
1st place, gold medalist(s)	India (IND)	74	69	72	74	72	361	GR
	Kynan Chenai	25	23	25	24	25	122	
	Zoravar Singh Sandhu	25	23	24	25	23	120	
	Prithviraj Tondaiman	24	23	23	25	24	119	
2nd place, silver medalist(s)	Kuwait (KUW)	72	73	72	72	70	359	
	Abdulrahman Al-Faihan	24	24	24	24	23	119	
	Khaled Al-Mudhaf	24	24	24	25	23	120	
	Talal Al-Rashidi	24	25	24	23	24	120	
3rd place, bronze medalist(s)	China (CHN)	73	69	70	69	73	354	
	Guo Yuhao	24	24	23	22	24	117	
	Qi Ying	25	22	24	24	24	119	
	Wang Yuhao	24	23	23	23	25	118	
4	Qatar (QAT)	68	70	70	74	71	353	
	Saeed Abusharib	22	22	24	25	24	117	
	Mohammed Al-Rumaihi	23	24	24	25	24	120	
	Rashid Hamad Al-Athba	23	24	22	24	23	116	
5	Kazakhstan (KAZ)	71	69	67	72	72	351	
	Alisher Aisalbayev	25	23	24	24	23	119	
	Maxim Bedarev	24	23	22	23	24	116	
	Daniil Pochivalov	22	23	21	25	25	116	
6	South Korea (KOR)	69	70	71	69	70	349	
	Ahn Dae-myeong	23	24	24	23	25	119	
	Jung Chang-hee	21	23	23	23	22	112	
	Kim Su-yeong	25	23	24	23	23	118	
7	Lebanon (LBN)	68	70	71	66	70	345	
	Elie Bejjani	22	22	24	20	22	110	
	Walid El-Najjar	24	24	23	22	23	116	
	Alain Moussa	22	24	24	24	25	119	
8	Chinese Taipei (TPE)	69	68	68	71	69	345	
	Chen Kuei-peng	23	22	22	21	22	110	
	Chuang Han-lin	22	21	24	25	24	116	
	Yang Kun-pi	24	25	22	25	23	119	
9	Philippines (PHI)	68	69	68	71	62	338	
	Eric Ang	20	21	21	24	21	107	
	Carlos Carag	24	23	22	25	20	114	
	Hagen Topacio	24	25	25	22	21	117	
10	Saudi Arabia (KSA)	67	60	67	67	63	324	
	Faisal Al-Dajani	19	16	21	20	21	97	
	Fahad Al-Mutairi	25	22	24	23	22	116	
	Mohammed Al-Shrideh	23	22	22	24	20	111	
