= 2016 Asian Shotgun Championships =

- Host city: Abu Dhabi, United Arab Emirates
- Dates: 1–9 November 2016
- Main venue: Al-Forsan International Sports Resort

The 2016 Asian Shotgun Championships were held at Al-Forsan International Sports Resort, Abu Dhabi, United Arab Emirates between 1 and 9 November 2016.

== Medal summary ==
=== Men ===
Event	Gold	Silver	Bronze
Trap	Khaled Al-Mudhaf; ISSF	Talal Al-Rashidi; ISSF	Abdulrahman Al-Faihan; ISSF
Trap team	ISSF; Abdulrahman Al-Faihan; Khaled Al-Mudhaf; Talal Al-Rashidi	India; Kynan Chenai; Zoravar Singh Sandhu; Prithviraj Tondaiman	Lebanon; Jad Hamade; Hicham Jabr; Alain Moussa
Double trap	Ahmad Al-Afasi; ISSF	Saif Al-Shamsi; United Arab Emirates	Ankur Mittal; India
Double trap team	ISSF; Ahmad Al-Afasi; Hamad Al-Afasi; Saad Al-Mutairi	India; Sangram Dahiya; Ankur Mittal; Yoginder Pal Singh	United Arab Emirates; Khaled Al-Kaabi; Juma Al-Maktoum; Saif Al-Shamsi
Skeet	Saeed Al-Maktoum; United Arab Emirates	Saud Habib; ISSF	Mairaj Ahmad Khan; India
Skeet team	ISSF; Naser Al-Deehani; Zaid Al-Mutairi; Saud Habib	Kazakhstan; Andrey Frolov; Vladislav Mukhamediyev; Alexandr Yechshenko	India; Mairaj Ahmad Khan; Gurjoat Khangura; Sheeraz Sheikh

=== Women ===
Event	Gold	Silver	Bronze
Trap	Sarah Al-Hawal; ISSF	Seema Tomar; India	Ray Bassil; Lebanon
Trap team	India; Rajeshwari Kumari; Shreyasi Singh; Seema Tomar	ISSF; Sarah Al-Hawal; Shahad Al-Hawal; Asmaa Al-Qatami	Qatar; Amna Al-Abdulla; Kholoud Al-Khalaf; Bana Haji
Skeet	Afrah Bin Hussain; ISSF	Isarapa Imprasertsuk; Thailand	Eman Al-Shamaa; ISSF
Skeet team	Qatar; Reem Al-Sharshani; Hajar Ghulam Mohammed; Sarah Ghulam Mohammed	ISSF; Shaikhah Al-Rashidi; Eman Al-Shamaa; Afrah Bin Hussain	Thailand; Isarapa Imprasertsuk; Sutiya Jiewchaloemmit; Nutchaya Sutarporn

== Medal table ==
Rank	Nation	Gold	Silver	Bronze	Total
1	International Shooting Sport Federation	7	4	2	13
2	India	1	3	3	7
3	United Arab Emirates	1	1	1	3
4	Qatar	1	0	1	2
5	Thailand	0	1	1	2
6	Kazakhstan	0	1	0	1
7	Lebanon	0	0	2	2
Totals (7 entries)		10	10	10	30

- Athletes from Kuwait competed as International Shooting Sport Federation (ISP) due to the suspension of the country's Olympic Committee.
