= Kuwait at the 2022 Asian Games =

- IOC code: KUW
- NOC: Kuwait Olympic Committee
- Website: www.kuwaitolympic.org

in Hangzhou 23 September 2023 – 8 October 2023
- Competitors: 133 in 25 sports
- Flag bearers: Khaled Al-Mudhaf & Eman Al-Shamaa (opening); Abdullah Shaaban (closing)
- Medals Ranked 23rd: Gold 3 Silver 4 Bronze 4 Total 11

Asian Games appearances (overview)
- 1974; 1978; 1982; 1986; 1990; 1994; 1998; 2002; 2006; 2010; 2014; 2018; 2022; 2026

Other related appearances
- Athletes from Kuwait (2010)

Kuwait competed at the 2022 Asian Games in Hangzhou. Originally scheduled to take place in 2022, the Games were postponed and rescheduled to 23 September until 8 October 2023, due to the COVID-19 pandemic. Shooters Khaled Al-Mudhaf and Eman Al-Shamaa were chosen as the flag bearers for the opening ceremony as Crown Prince Mishal Al-Ahmad attended the ceremony.

== Medalists ==
The following Kuwait competitors won medals at the Games.

| Medal | Name | Sport | Event | Date |
|---|---|---|---|---|
| Gold | Abdullah Al-Rashidi | Shooting | Men's skeet | 27 September |
| Gold | Yaqoub Al-Youha | Athletics | Men's 110 metres hurdles | 2 October |
| Gold | Fahad Al-Ajmi | Karate | Men's 67 kg kumite | 7 October |
| Silver | Abdullah Al-Rashidi; Eman Al-Shamaa | Shooting | Mixed skeet team | 28 September |
| Silver | Abdulrahman Al-Faihan; Khaled Al-Mudhaf; Talal Al-Rashidi | Shooting | Men's trap team | 1 October |
| Silver | Talal Al-Rashidi | Shooting | Men's trap | 1 October |
| Silver | Abdullah Shaaban | Karate | Men's 60 kg kumite | 6 October |
| Bronze | Yousef Al-Shamlan | Fencing | Men's individual sabre | 25 September |
| Bronze | Men's Handball Team | Handball | Men's Handball | 5 October |
| Bronze | Sayed Salman Al-Mosawi | Karate | Men's kata | 5 October |
| Bronze | Mohammed Husain; Sayed Mohammed Al-Mosawi; Sayed Salman Al-Mosawi | Karate | Men's team kata | 8 October |

By sport events

Medals by sport
| Sport | 1st place, gold medalist(s) | 2nd place, silver medalist(s) | 3rd place, bronze medalist(s) | Total |
| Athletics | 1 | 0 | 0 | 1 |
| Fencing | 0 | 0 | 1 | 1 |
| Handball | 0 | 0 | 1 | 1 |
| Karate | 1 | 1 | 2 | 4 |
| Shooting | 1 | 3 | 0 | 4 |
| Total | 3 | 4 | 4 | 11 |

Timeline

Medals by day
| Date | 1st place, gold medalist(s) | 2nd place, silver medalist(s) | 3rd place, bronze medalist(s) | Total |
| September 25 | 0 | 0 | 1 | 1 |
| September 27 | 1 | 0 | 0 | 1 |
| September 28 | 0 | 1 | 0 | 1 |
| October 1 | 0 | 2 | 0 | 2 |
| October 2 | 1 | 0 | 0 | 1 |
| October 5 | 0 | 0 | 2 | 2 |
| October 6 | 0 | 1 | 0 | 1 |
| October 7 | 1 | 0 | 0 | 1 |
| October 8 | 0 | 0 | 1 | 1 |
| Total | 3 | 4 | 4 | 11 |

== Competitors ==
Kuwait sent 133 athletes, 111 men and 22 women, in 25 sports.

| Sport | Men | Women | Total |
|---|---|---|---|
| Aquatics | 2 | 0 | 2 |
| Athletics | 5 | 2 | 7 |
| Archery | 5 | 4 | 9 |
| Boxing | 3 | 1 | 4 |
| Chess | 1 | 1 | 2 |
| Cycling | 2 | 2 | 4 |
| Equestrian | 4 | 0 | 4 |
| Esports | 2 | 0 | 2 |
| Fencing | 9 | 0 | 9 |
| Football | 18 | 0 | 18 |
| Golf | 1 | 0 | 1 |
| Gymnastics | 0 | 1 | 1 |
| Handball | 16 | 0 | 16 |
| Ju-jitsu | 5 | 0 | 5 |
| Judo | 2 | 0 | 2 |
| Karate | 6 | 1 | 7 |
| Kurash | 3 | 0 | 3 |
| Rowing | 3 | 2 | 5 |
| Shooting | 12 | 7 | 19 |
| Sport Climbing | 1 | 0 | 1 |
| Squash | 4 | 0 | 4 |
| Taekwondo | 2 | 0 | 2 |
| Tennis | 3 | 0 | 3 |
| Tirathlon | 1 | 1 | 2 |
| Wrestling | 1 | 0 | 1 |
| Total | 111 | 22 | 133 |

== Football ==
Kuwait under-23 men team were drawn in Group E the Asian Games.

Summary

Key:

- A.E.T – After extra time.
- P – Match decided by penalty-shootout.

| Team | Event | Group Stage | | | | Round of 16 | Quarterfinal | Semifinal | Final / BM | |
| Team | Event | Opposition Score | Opposition Score | Opposition Score | Rank | Opposition Score | Opposition Score | Opposition Score | Opposition Score | Rank |
|---|---|---|---|---|---|---|---|---|---|---|
| Kuwait men's | Men's football | South Korea; L 0–9 | Bahrain; D 1–1 | Thailand; D 1–1 | 4 | Did not advance | | | | |

=== Men's tournament ===
Roster

The following 21 players list is the Kuwait squad for the 2022 Asian Games. Originally named in the final squad, Salman Al-Bose withdrew and was not replaced.

Head Coach: (Portugal) Emílio Peixe

| No. | Pos. | Player | Date of birth (age) | Club |
|---|---|---|---|---|
| 1 | GK | Abdulrahman Al-Fadhli | 23 March 2001 (aged 22) | (Kuwait Football Association) Al-Salmiya |
| 2 | DF | Abdulrahman Al-Daihani | 21 January 2001 (aged 22) | (Kuwait Football Association) Al-Qadsia |
| 3 | DF | Faisal Al-Shatti | 19 May 2002 (aged 21) | (Kuwait Football Association) Al-Qadsia |
| 4 | DF | Youssef Al-Haqqan | 5 February 2002 (aged 21) | (Kuwait Football Association) Al-Qadsia |
| 5 | DF | Khaled Al-Fadhli | 23 February 2002 (aged 21) | (Kuwait Football Association) Al-Qadsia |
| 6 | DF | Abdulaziz Mahran | 19 August 2001 (aged 22) | (Kuwait Football Association) Al-Nasr |
| 7 | MF | Hamad Al-Taweel | 26 July 2001 (aged 22) | (Kuwait Football Association) Khaitan |
| 8 | MF | Fahad Al-Fadhli | 4 February 2001 (aged 22) | (Kuwait Football Association) Kazma |
| 9 | FW | Salman Al-Awadi | 21 May 2001 (aged 22) | (Kuwait Football Association) Al-Arabi |
| 10 | MF | Bandar Al Salamah | 28 October 2002 (aged 20) | (Kuwait Football Association) Al-Arabi |
| 11 | DF | Othman Al-Dosari | 29 May 2002 (aged 21) | (Kuwait Football Association) Al-Salmiya |
| 12 | DF | Mohsen Falah | 11 November 2004 (aged 18) | (Kuwait Football Association) Al-Kuwait |
| 13 | DF | Sultan Al-Faraj | 16 June 2001 (aged 22) | (Kuwait Football Association) Al-Kuwait |
| 14 | MF | Badr Jamal | 16 August 2002 (aged 21) | (Kuwait Football Association) Fahaheel |
| 15 | DF | Muhammad Al-Rashed | 2 April 2003 (aged 20) | (Kuwait Football Association) Al-Kuwait |
| 17 | FW | Talal Al-Qaissi | 21 June 2002 (aged 21) | (Kuwait Football Association) Kazma |
| 18 | MF | Bader Al-Mutairi | 26 September 2003 (aged 19) | (Kuwait Football Association) Al-Arabi |
| 19 | MF | Fahd Al-Harbi | 16 November 2002 (aged 20) | (Kuwait Football Association) Al-Kuwait |
| 21 | FW | Fahad Al-Azmi | 1 January 2003 (aged 20) | (Kuwait Football Association) Al-Salmiya |
| 22 | GK | Dhari Al-Otaibi | 31 March 2002 (aged 21) | (Kuwait Football Association) Al-Kuwait |
| 23 | GK | Abdulaziz Al-Bahr | 19 September 2001 (aged 22) | (Kuwait Football Association) Al-Qadsia |

Group E

| Pos | Team | Pld | W | D | L | GF | GA | GD | Pts | Qualification |
|---|---|---|---|---|---|---|---|---|---|---|
| 1 | South Korea | 3 | 3 | 0 | 0 | 16 | 0 | +16 | 9 | Knockout stage |
| 2 | Bahrain | 3 | 0 | 2 | 1 | 2 | 5 | −3 | 2 | Knockout stage |
| 3 | Thailand | 3 | 0 | 2 | 1 | 2 | 6 | −4 | 2 | Knockout stage |
| 4 | Kuwait | 3 | 0 | 2 | 1 | 2 | 11 | −9 | 2 | |

Source: Football – Men – Groups
Rules for classification: Group stage tiebreakers
19 September 2023
19:30

| South Korea | 9–0 | Kuwait |
|---|---|---|
| Jeong Woo-yeong 3', 45', 48'; Cho Young-wook 19', 74'; Paik Seung-ho 44'; Um Won-sang 52'; Park Jae-yong 80'; An Jae-jun 90+6' | Report |

Jinhua Stadium, Jinhua
Attendance: 2,936
Referee: Hasan Akrami (Iran)

21 September 2023
16:00

| Kuwait | 1–1 | Bahrain |
|---|---|---|
| Al-Awadi 74' | Report | Redha 52' |

Jinhua Stadium, Jinhua
Attendance: 1,250
Referee: Yudai Yamamoto (Japan)

24 September 2023
19:30

| Thailand | 1–1 | Kuwait |
|---|---|---|
| Jakkapong 9' | Report | Al-Haqqan 90' |

Zhejiang Normal University East Stadium, Jinhua
Attendance: 2,419
Referee: Alex King (Australia)

== Handball ==
Summary

Key:

- ET – After extra time
- P – Match decided by penalty-shootout.

| Team | Event | Preliminary | Standing | Main / Class. | Rank / standing | Semifinals / Pl. | Final / BM / Pl. | |
| Team | Event | Opposition score | Standing | Opposition score | Rank / standing | Opposition score | Opposition score | Rank |
|---|---|---|---|---|---|---|---|---|
| Kuwait men's | Men's tournament | Group A Thailand: W 49–19; China: W 27–24 | 1 Q | Group I Iran: W 24–22; South Korea: W 25–24; Bahrain: L 25–34 | 2 Q | Qatar; L 24–29 | Japan; W 31–30 | 3rd place, bronze medalist(s) |

=== Men’s tournament ===
Team roster
- Abdulaziz Al-Shammari
- Abdulaziz Naseeb
- Abdulaziz Salmin
- Abdullah Al-Khamees
- Abdulrahman Safar
- Fahad Al-Salboukh
- Fawaz Mubarak
- Hassan Safar
- Haider Dashti
- Mishal Al-Harbi
- Mohammed Al-Hendal
- Mohammed Al-Sanea
- Mohammed Buyabes
- Mohammed Qambar
- Saleh Ali
- Yousef Najim

Preliminary round – Group A

| Pos | Team | Pld | W | D | L | GF | GA | GD | Pts | Qualification |
|---|---|---|---|---|---|---|---|---|---|---|
| 1 | Kuwait | 2 | 2 | 0 | 0 | 76 | 43 | +33 | 4 | Main round |
| 2 | China | 2 | 1 | 0 | 1 | 64 | 44 | +20 | 2 | Main round |
| 3 | Thailand | 2 | 0 | 0 | 2 | 36 | 89 | −53 | 0 | |

Source: AHF

| 25 September; 12:00 | Kuwait | 49–19 | Thailand | ZJSU Sports Centre, Hangzhou; Referees: Al-Marhoon, Al-Mawt (BHR) |
| 25 September; 12:00 | Al-Hendal 8 | (24–8) | Saengsan 6 | ZJSU Sports Centre, Hangzhou; Referees: Al-Marhoon, Al-Mawt (BHR) |
| 25 September; 12:00 | 1× (yellow card) 6× (suspension) | | 4× (suspension) | ZJSU Sports Centre, Hangzhou; Referees: Al-Marhoon, Al-Mawt (BHR) |

| 27 September; 18:00 | China | 24–27 | Kuwait | ZJSU Sports Centre, Hangzhou; Referees: Furukawa, Murata (JPN) |
| 27 September; 18:00 | Zhang J., Rao 5 | (13–14) | Al-Khamees 6 | ZJSU Sports Centre, Hangzhou; Referees: Furukawa, Murata (JPN) |
| 27 September; 18:00 | 1× (yellow card) 3× (suspension) | | 1× (yellow card) 5× (suspension) 1× (red card) | ZJSU Sports Centre, Hangzhou; Referees: Furukawa, Murata (JPN) |

Main round – Group I

| Pos | Team | Pld | W | D | L | GF | GA | GD | Pts | Qualification |
|---|---|---|---|---|---|---|---|---|---|---|
| 1 | Bahrain | 3 | 3 | 0 | 0 | 92 | 71 | +21 | 6 | Semifinals |
| 2 | Kuwait | 3 | 2 | 0 | 1 | 74 | 80 | −6 | 4 | Semifinals |
| 3 | South Korea | 3 | 1 | 0 | 2 | 75 | 78 | −3 | 2 | |
| 4 | Iran | 3 | 0 | 0 | 3 | 66 | 78 | −12 | 0 | |

Source: AHF

| 29 September; 12:00 | Iran | 22–24 | Kuwait | ZJSU Sports Centre, Hangzhou; Referees: Ismoilov, Ismoilov (UZB) |
| 29 September; 12:00 | Taheri, Behnamnia 5 | (10–10) | Al-Musawi 5 | ZJSU Sports Centre, Hangzhou; Referees: Ismoilov, Ismoilov (UZB) |
| 29 September; 12:00 | 2× (suspension) | | 3× (suspension) | ZJSU Sports Centre, Hangzhou; Referees: Ismoilov, Ismoilov (UZB) |

| 30 September; 18:00 | Kuwait | 25–24 | South Korea | ZJSU Sports Centre, Hangzhou; Referees: Cheng, Zhou (CHN) |
| 30 September; 18:00 | Al-Hendal 7 | (9–13) | Jang 6 | ZJSU Sports Centre, Hangzhou; Referees: Cheng, Zhou (CHN) |
| 30 September; 18:00 | 1× (yellow card) 4× (suspension) | | 1× (yellow card) 5× (suspension) 1× (red card) | ZJSU Sports Centre, Hangzhou; Referees: Cheng, Zhou (CHN) |

| 1 October; 18:00 | Kuwait | 25–34 | Bahrain | ZJSU Sports Centre, Hangzhou; Referees: Ismoilov, Ismoilov (UZB) |
| 1 October; 18:00 | Abdula. Al-Shammari, Al-Harbi 7 | (11–21) | Naser 8 | ZJSU Sports Centre, Hangzhou; Referees: Ismoilov, Ismoilov (UZB) |
| 1 October; 18:00 | 2× (suspension) | | 1× (yellow card) 5× (suspension) | ZJSU Sports Centre, Hangzhou; Referees: Ismoilov, Ismoilov (UZB) |

Semifinal

| 3 October; 18:00 | Qatar | 29–24 | Kuwait | ZJSU Sports Centre, Hangzhou; Referees: Murata, Furukawa (JPN) |
| 3 October; 18:00 | Carol 7 | (12–12) | Al-Musawi, Salmeen 4 | ZJSU Sports Centre, Hangzhou; Referees: Murata, Furukawa (JPN) |
| 3 October; 18:00 | 1× (yellow card) 3× (suspension) | | 1× (yellow card) 7× (suspension) 1× (red card) | ZJSU Sports Centre, Hangzhou; Referees: Murata, Furukawa (JPN) |

Bronze medal match

| 5 October; 15:00 | Japan | 30–31 | Kuwait | ZJSU Sports Centre, Hangzhou; Referees: Cheng, Zhou (CHN) |
| 5 October; 15:00 | Yoshino 9 | (14–14) | Abdula. Al-Shammari 7 | ZJSU Sports Centre, Hangzhou; Referees: Cheng, Zhou (CHN) |
| 5 October; 15:00 | 1× (yellow card) 3× (suspension) | | 1× (yellow card) 4× (suspension) | ZJSU Sports Centre, Hangzhou; Referees: Cheng, Zhou (CHN) |

== Shooting ==
The Kuwait Olympic Committee announced that it has sent 19 shooters to the Asian Games.

Men
Individual

| Athlete | Event | Qualification | | Final | |
| Athlete | Event | Score | Rank | Score | Rank |
|---|---|---|---|---|---|
| Abdullah Al-Harbi | 10m air pistol | 615.3 | 48 | Did not advance | |
| Ali Al-Mutairi | 10m air pistol | 618.3 | 41 | Did not advance | |
| Saud Al-Subaie | 10m air pistol | 613.6 | 51 | Did not advance | |
| Abdullah Al-Rashidi | Skeet | 120 | 6 Q | 60 | 1st place, gold medalist(s) |
| Mansour Al-Rashidi | Skeet | 116 | 19 | Did not advance | |
| Abdulaziz Al-Saad | Skeet | 113 | 26 | Did not advance | |
| Abdulrahman Al-Faihan | Trap | 119 | 12 | Did not advance | |
| Khaled Al-Mudhaf | Trap | 120 | 4 | 21 | 6 |
| Talal Al-Rashidi | Trap | 120 | 3 | 45 | 2nd place, silver medalist(s) |

Women
Individual

| Athlete | Event | Qualification | | Final | |
| Athlete | Event | Score | Rank | Score | Rank |
|---|---|---|---|---|---|
| Amerah Awad | 25m pistol | 268-7x | 42 | Did not advance | |
| Afrah Mohammed | Skeet | 108 | 19 | Did not advance | |
| Eman Al-Shamaa | Skeet | 113 | 10 | Did not advance | |
| Fatima Al-Zaabi | Skeet | 95 | 23 | Did not advance | |
| Hajar Abdulmalik | Trap | 102 | 21 | Did not advance | |
| Shahad Al-Hawal | Trap | 114 | 6 | 21 | 5 |
| Sarah Al-Hawal | Trap | 102 | 22 | Did not advance | |

Team

| Athlete | Event | Final | |
| Athlete | Event | Score | Rank |
|---|---|---|---|
| Abdullah Al-Harbi; Ali Al-Mutairi; Saud Al-Subaie | 10m Men's air pistol | 1847.2-122x | 14 |
| Abdullah Al-Rashidi; Mansour Al-Rashidi; Abdulaziz Al-Saad | Men's Skeet team | 349 | 6 |
| Afrah Mohammed; Eman Al-Shamaa; Fatima Al-Zaabi | Women's Skeet team | 316 | 7 |
| Abdulrahman Al-Faihan; Khaled Al-Mudhaf; Talal Al-Rashidi | Men's Trap team | 359 | 2nd place, silver medalist(s) |
| Hajar Abdulmalik; Shahad Al-Hawal; Sarah Al-Hawal | Women's Skeet team | 318 | 7 |

Mixed team

| Athlete | Event | Qualification | | Final | |
| Athlete | Event | Score | Rank | Score | Rank |
|---|---|---|---|---|---|
| Abdullah Al-Rashidi; Eman Al-Shamaa | Skeet team | 149 | 1 | 35 | 2nd place, silver medalist(s) |

== Sport climbing ==
Speed

| Athlete | Event | Qualification | | Round of 16 | Quarter-finals | Semi-finals | Final / BM | |
| Athlete | Event | Best | Rank | Opposition Time | Opposition Time | Opposition Time | Opposition Time | Rank |
|---|---|---|---|---|---|---|---|---|
| Nasser Abuergeeb | Men's | 8.474 | 23 | Did not advance | | | | |

Combined

| Athlete | Event | Qualification | | | | Semi-finals | | | | Final | | | |
| Athlete | Event | Boulder Point | Lead Point | Total | Rank | Boulder Point | Lead Point | Total | Rank | Boulder Point | Lead Point | Total | Rank |
|---|---|---|---|---|---|---|---|---|---|---|---|---|---|
| Nasser Abuergeeb | Men's | 9.7 | 10 | 19.7 | 22 | Did not advance | | | | | | | |

== Tennis ==
Men

| Athlete | Event | Round of 64 | Round of 32 | Round of 16 | Quarter-finals | Semi-finals | Final | |
| Athlete | Event | Opposition Score | Opposition Score | Opposition Score | Opposition Score | Opposition Score | Opposition Score | Rank |
|---|---|---|---|---|---|---|---|---|
| Bader Alqahtani | Singles | Fomin (UZB); L 0–6, 4–6 | Did not advance | | | | | |
| Essa Qabazard | Singles | Samrej (THA); L 1–6, 4–6 | Did not advance | | | | | |
| Bader Alqahtani; Essa Qabazard | Doubles | —N/a | Fomin / Sultanov (UZB); L 3–6, 1–6 | Did not advance | | | | |

== See also ==
- Kuwait at the Asian Games
- Kuwait at the 2022 Asian Para Games
