= Maheshwari Chauhan =

Indian sport shooter (born 1996)

Personal information
- Born: 4 July 1996 (age 30) Siyana, Rajasthan, India
- Education: Lady Shri Ram College
- Height: 1.56 m (5 ft 1 in)
- Weight: 47 kg (104 lb)

Sport
- Sport: Shooting
- Event: Skeet
- Coached by: Amardeep Rai; Ennio Falco; Riccardo Filippelli
Medal record
Women's skeet shooting
Representing India
Asian Games
Bronze medal – third place	2026 Aichi–Nagoya	Team
Asian Championships
Gold medal – first place	2024 Kuwait	Team
Silver medal – second place	2017 Astana	Team
Bronze medal – third place	2017 Astana	Individual
Bronze medal – third place	2024 Kuwait	Individual
Bronze medal – third place	2025 Shymkent	Team

Maheshwari Chauhan (born 4 July 1996) is an Indian skeet shooter. Chauhan finished fourth in the mixed skeet event at the 2024 Paris Olympics, losing the bronze medal by a point, with a scoreline of 43–44. She also competed in the Women's individual event, placing 14th with a score of 118.

== Early life ==
Chauhan was born in Siana, Jalore district, Rajasthan. She completed her studies at Lady Shri Ram College, New Delhi. She used to shoot for fun along with her grandfather Ganpat Singh, father Pradeep Singh and brother Daksheshwar Singh at the family's private range in Siana.

== Personal life ==
She married hotelier Adhiraj Singh in 2023.

== Career ==
Chauhan was the first Indian to win an individual medal in women's skeet at an international event. She was trained under national coach Vikram Singh Chopra.

The 21-year-old secured the bronze on Day 5 at the 7th Asian Championship Shotgun in Astana, Kazakhstan. India won two gold, one silver, and three bronze medals at the event. The young shooter also led her country to the team silver alongside compatriots Rashmi Rathore and Saniya Shaikh. The triad of Indian eves shot a total of 190, narrowly losing out to gold medallists China, who shot 195. Hosts Kazakhstan secured the bronze with a score of 185.

== See also ==
- Shooting in India
