= David McMath =

Scottish sport shooter

Personal information
- Full name: David Alexander McMath
- Born: 31 August 1996 (age 29) Dumfries, Scotland
- Height: 181 cm (5 ft 11 in)
- Weight: 80 kg (176 lb)

Sport
- Country: Scotla nd
- Sport: Shooting
- Event: Double Trap
Medal record
Shooting
Representing Scotland
Commonwealth Games
Gold medal – first place	2018 Gold Coast	Men's double trap

David Alexander McMath (born 31 August 1996) is a Scottish sport shooter. He competed in the men's double trap event at the 2018 Commonwealth Games, winning the gold medal. McMath was born in Dumfries but brought up in Castle Douglas attending the high school there.
