= Ankur Mittal =

Indian sport shooter

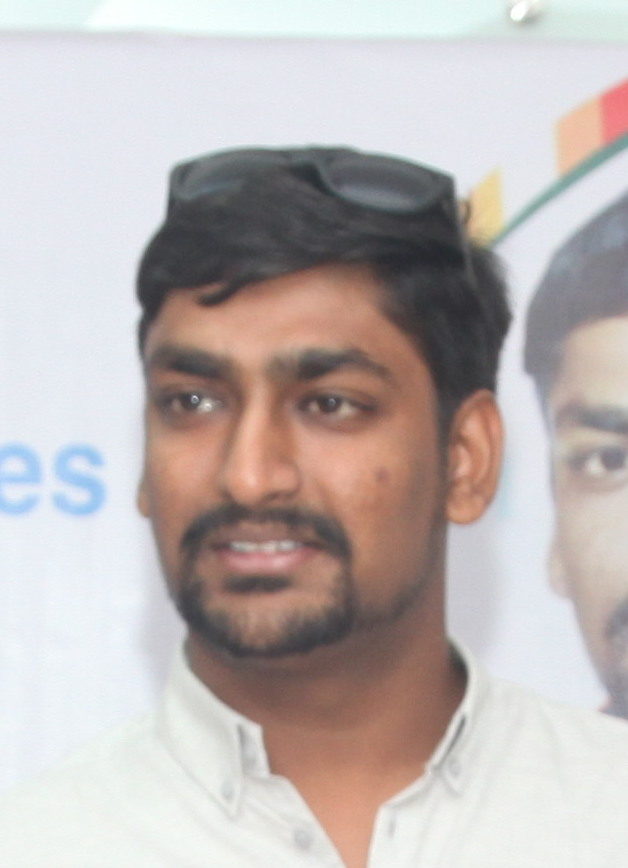
- Mittal in 2017

Personal information
- Nationality: Indian
- Born: 30 March 1992 (age 34) Sonipat, Haryana, India

Sport
- Country: India
- Sport: Sport shooter
- Rank: Former World No. 1
- Event: Double trap/Trap

Achievements and titles
- Highest world ranking: 1
- Personal best: 145/150, 75/80(World Record)
Medal record
Men's shooting
Representing India
World Championships
Gold medal – first place	2018 Changwon	Double trap
Silver medal – second place	2017 Moscow	Double trap
Bronze medal – third place	2018 Changwon	Team double trap
Asian Championships
Gold medal – first place	2014 Al-Ain	Double trap
Gold medal – first place	2017 Astana	Double trap
Gold medal – first place	2017 Astana	Double trap team
Gold medal – first place	2025 Shymkent	Double Trap
Silver medal – second place	2016 Abu Dhabi	Double trap team
Bronze medal – third place	2014 Al-Ain	Double trap team
Bronze medal – third place	2016 Abu Dhabi	Double trap
Bronze medal – third place	2025 Shymkent	Double Trap team
Commonwealth Games
Bronze medal – third place	2018 Gold Coast	Double trap
Commonwealth Championships
Gold medal – first place	2017 Brisbane	Double trap

Ankur Mittal (born 30 March 1992) is an Indian shooter. He has won gold in the Double Trap event at the 2018 ISSF World Shooting Championships at Changwon, South Korea and a silver medal at the 2017 ISSF World Shotgun Championships at Moscow, Russia. He has received Bheem Award from Haryana State and Arjuna Award from President of India in 2018.

== Early life and education ==
Mittal was born on 30 March 1992 in Sonipat, Haryana. He is the son of a former double trap shooter, Ashok Mittal and younger brother of Ajay Mittal who have been into Indian Shooting Team and won several medal including Gold in Asian Championships at Kuwait in 2017. He went to St. Margaret Sr. Sec. School and he was an Arts student at Hansraj College, Delhi and did his MBA from Manav Rachna International University, Faridabad.

== Career ==
On 27 July, at Glasgow, Scotland in the Commonwealth Games in the Men's Double trap event, Ankur secured second position in the qualification round with a score of 132 points. He made it to the semi-final where he placed 5th with a score of 25 points.

In Delhi, India at the ISSF World Cup, Ankur participated in Double Trap Shooting event and won a silver medal.

In Acapulco, Mexico at the ISSF World Cup in Double Trap Shooting event, Ankur won the Gold Medal creating a World Record.

In Astana, Kazakhstan at the 7th Asian Shotgun Championship, Ankur won a gold medal in Double Trap Shooting event as well as a team gold medal.

In Moscow, Russia at the ISSF Shotgun World Championships, Ankur participated in Double Trap Shooting event and won a silver medal.

Ankur Mittal has been ranked as World No. 1 in Double Trap Shooting (Men) and only the second Indian shooter to achieve this feat.

In Gold Coast, Queensland at the Commonwealth Games, Ankur won a bronze medal in the Double Trap Shooting event with a score of 53 points.
