= Saud Habib =

Kuwaiti sport shooter

Personal information
- Full name: Saud Habib
- Nationality: Kuwait
- Born: 4 January 1979 (age 47) Kuwait City, Kuwait
- Height: 175 cm (5 ft 9 in)
- Weight: 69 kg (152 lb)

Sport
- Sport: Shooting
- Event: Skeet (SK125)
- Club: Kuwait City Shooting Club
- Coached by: Petr Málek
Medal record
Men's shooting
Representing Kuwait
Asian Championships
Gold medal – first place	2007 Kuwait City	Skeet team
Gold medal – first place	2015 Kuwait City	Skeet
Silver medal – second place	2015 Kuwait City	Skeet team
Silver medal – second place	2019 Doha	Skeet team
Bronze medal – third place	2019 Doha	Skeet
Asian Shotgun Championships
Gold medal – first place	2014 Al-Ain	Skeet team
Gold medal – first place	2016 Abu Dhabi	Skeet team
Gold medal – first place	2018 Kuwait City	Skeet team
Silver medal – second place	2016 Abu Dhabi	Skeet
Silver medal – second place	2024 Kuwait City	Skeet team

Saud Habib (Arabic: سعود حبيب; born January 4, 1979, in Kuwait City) is a Kuwaiti sport shooter. He represented his nation Kuwait in two editions of the Olympic Games (2000 and 2016), and also won a bronze medal in men's skeet shooting at the 2000 ISSF World Cup meet in New Delhi, India. Habib is also a member of the Kuwait City Shooting Club, where he trains full-time under Czech-born coach and 2000 Olympic silver medalist Petr Málek.

== Career ==
Habib made his Olympic debut for Kuwait in shooting at the 2000 Summer Olympics. There, he tallied 117 clay pigeons out of a possible 125 to share a thirty-fifth place tie with three other shooters in the men's skeet.

Sixteen years after his Olympic debut, Habib qualified for his second Kuwaiti team, as a 37-year-old and a member of the Independent Olympic Participants, at the 2016 Summer Olympics in Rio de Janeiro. Despite his defeat 12–13 to United Arab Emirates' Saif bin Futtais in the gold medal match, he consoled himself with a minimum qualifying score of 121 and the first of four available slots at the 2016 Asian Olympic Qualifying Tournament in New Delhi, India.
