= Khaled Al-Kaabi =

Emirati sport shooter

Personal information
- Nationality: Emirati
- Born: June 25, 1985 (age 41)

Sport
- Sport: Shooting
Medal record
Men's shooting
Representing United Arab Emirates
Asian Championships
Silver medal – second place	2017 Astana	Double trap
Silver medal – second place	2017 Astana	Double trap team
Bronze medal – third place	2016 Abu Dhabi	Double trap team

Khaled Al-Kaabi (born June 25, 1985) is an Emirati sport shooter. An Abu Dhabi Police First Warrant Officer. Al Kaabi placed seventh in the men's double trap event at the 2016 Summer Olympics. Al Kaabi gained a gold medal in Olympic Qualifier Asian Championship, India, which qualified him for the Olympics by winning the double trap gold at the Asian Shooting Qualifier ahead of Kuwait's Fehaid Al Deehani, a bronze medal winner at the 2000 Sydney and 2012 London Games. Al Kaabi has received a major "morale boost" ahead of his double trap. The latest Asian rankings, which see him climb to No2 in the men's double trap. Al Kaabi Won Gold Medal (Individuals) in Pan Arab Shooting Championship, Morocco 2015. Al Kaabi who is seeded 7th in the Olympic Ranking, won gold medal of Cyprus Grand Prix in Shogun 2017.
