= 2017 Asian Shotgun Championships =

- Host city: Astana, Kazakhstan
- Dates: 3–14 August 2017
- Main venue: Target Shooting Club

The 2017 Asian Shotgun Championships were held in Astana, Kazakhstan between August 3 and 14, 2017.

== Medal summary ==
=== Men ===
Event	Gold	Silver	Bronze
Trap	Abdulrahman Al-Faihan; Kuwait	Talal Al-Rashidi; Kuwait	Kynan Chenai; India
Trap team	Kuwait; Abdulrahman Al-Faihan; Khaled Al-Mudhaf; Talal Al-Rashidi	Lebanon; Hicham Jabr; Alain Moussa; Roger Slaiby	United Arab Emirates; Hamad Al-Kendi; Saif Al-Shamsi; Abdulla Buhaliba
Double trap	Ankur Mittal; India	Khaled Al-Kaabi; United Arab Emirates	Saif Al-Shamsi; United Arab Emirates
Double trap team	India; Mohammed Asab; Sangram Dahiya; Ankur Mittal	United Arab Emirates; Khaled Al-Kaabi; Yahya Al-Mheiri; Saif Al-Shamsi	China; Chen Xinyu; Hu Binyuan; Huang Xianghua
Skeet	Saif Bin Futtais; United Arab Emirates	Alexandr Yechshenko; Kazakhstan	Makoto Yokouchi; Japan
Skeet team	Kuwait; Abdullah Al-Rashidi; Mansour Al-Rashidi; Abdulaziz Al-Saad	Kazakhstan; Vitaliy Kulikov; Vladislav Mukhamediyev; Alexandr Yechshenko	India; Angad Vir Singh Bajwa; Mairaj Ahmad Khan; Sheeraz Sheikh

=== Women ===
Event	Gold	Silver	Bronze
Trap	Zhang Xinqiu; China	Ray Bassil; Lebanon	Mariya Dmitriyenko; Kazakhstan
Trap team	China; Li Qingnian; Wang Xiaojing; Zhang Xinqiu	North Korea; Kim Yong-bok; Pak Yong-hui; Yang Sol-i	Kazakhstan; Anastassiya Davydova; Mariya Dmitriyenko; Aizhan Dosmagambetova
Skeet	Wei Meng; China	Sutiya Jiewchaloemmit; Thailand	Maheshwari Chauhan; India
Skeet team	China; Gao Jinmei; Wei Meng; Yu Xiumin	India; Maheshwari Chauhan; Rashmmi Rathore; Saniya Shaikh	Kazakhstan; Anastassiya Molchanova; Assem Orynbay; Olga Panarina

=== Mixed ===
Event	Gold	Silver	Bronze
Trap team	Kuwait; Abdulrahman Al-Faihan; Sarah Al-Hawal	South Korea; Oh Tae-keun; Kang Gee-eun	India; Kynan Chenai; Shreyasi Singh

== Medal table ==
Rank	Nation	Gold	Silver	Bronze	Total
1	Kuwait	4	1	0	5
2	China	4	0	1	5
3	India	2	1	4	7
4	United Arab Emirates	1	2	2	5
5	Kazakhstan	0	2	3	5
6	Lebanon	0	2	0	2
7	North Korea	0	1	0	1
7	South Korea	0	1	0	1
7	Thailand	0	1	0	1
10	Japan	0	0	1	1
Totals (10 entries)		11	11	11	33
