= Shooting at the 2018 Commonwealth Games – Men's double trap =

Shooting – Men's double trap at the 2018 Commonwealth Games
- Venue: Belmont Shooting Centre, Brisbane
- Dates: 11 April 2018
- Competitors: 27 from 15 nations

Medalists
gold medal	David McMath	Scotland
silver medal	Tim Kneale	Isle of Man
bronze medal	Ankur Mittal	India

The Men's double trap took place on 11 April 2018 at the Belmont Shooting Centre. There was a qualification in which the top 6 athletes qualified for the finals.

== Results ==
=== Qualification ===
Rank	Name	1	2	ex 60	3	ex 90	4	ex 120	5	Total	Notes
1	David McMath (SCO)	29	25	54	29	83	25	108	29	137+6	Q
2	Mohammed Asab (IND)	30	27	57	29	86	26	112	25	137+5	Q
3	Tim Kneale (IOM)	25	28	53	26	79	26	105	30	135	Q
4	James Willett (AUS)	25	28	53	28	81	26	107	27	134	Q
5	Ankur Mittal (IND)	28	25	53	27	80	26	106	27	133	Q
6	Aamer Iqbal (PAK)	27	26	53	27	80	26	106	26	132	Q
7	Stephen Theodotou (CYP)	27	26	53	22	75	30	105	26	131	
8	Matthew French (ENG)	24	28	52	21	73	29	102	28	130	
9	William Chetcuti (MLT)	26	25	51	25	76	26	102	28	130	
10	Calum Fraser (SCO)	26	26	52	26	78	24	102	27	129	
11	Scott Wilson (NZL)	25	23	48	25	73	26	99	28	127	
12	Nathan-Lee Xuereb (MLT)	24	29	53	24	77	26	103	22	125	
13	Steven Scott (ENG)	24	24	48	27	75	29	104	20	124	
14	Muhammad Farrukh Nadeem (PAK)	25	27	52	22	74	24	98	24	122	
15	Benjamin Cheng Jie Khor (MAS)	27	20	47	26	73	24	97	22	119	
16	Eng Wei Jin (MAS)	22	25	47	23	70	22	92	25	117	
17	Jake Keeling (IOM)	23	21	44	23	67	21	88	23	111	
18	Brancker South (NFI)	23	20	43	22	65	20	85	22	107	
19	Francis Caffarelli (SAM)	22	19	41	18	59	18	77	21	98	
20	Swee Phua (FIJ)	22	17	39	18	57	20	77	20	97	
21	Clinton Judd (NFI)	15	20	35	17	52	20	72	19	91	
22	Morgan Magatogia (NIU)	21	18	39	18	57	19	76	12	88	
23	Quintyn Stephen (FIJ)	17	17	34	19	53	14	67	17	84	
24	Graham Didlick (FAI)	17	14	31	17	48	15	63	16	79	
25	Ioane Galuvao (SAM)	12	17	29	17	46	16	62	13	75	
26	Toutu Talaiti (NIU)	16	15	31	12	43	16	59	15	74	
27	Glen Smith (FAI)	15	12	27	14	41	13	54	15	69	

=== Finals ===
Rank	Name	Stage 1 & ex 30	Stage 2	ex 40	Stage 3	ex 50	Stage 4	ex 60	Stage 5	ex 80	Final Score	Notes
1st place, gold medalist(s)	David McMath (SCO)	26	10	36	10	46	9	55	19	74	74	GR
2nd place, silver medalist(s)	Tim Kneale (IOM)	26	8	34	10	44	9	53	17	70	70	
3rd place, bronze medalist(s)	Ankur Mittal (IND)	28	9	37	9	46	7	53	—	—	53	
4	Mohammed Asab (IND)	24	10	34	9	43	—	—	—	—	43	
5	Aamer Iqbal (PAK)	24	7	31	—	—	—	—	—	—	31	
6	James Willett (AUS)	23	—	—	—	—	—	—	—	—	23	
