= Siyana, Rajasthan =

Siyana (सियाना)
- Village
- Location in Rajasthan, India Siyana (सियाना) (India)
- Coordinates: 25.117°N 72.66°E
- Country: India
- State: Rajasthan
- District: Jalore
- Talukas: Jalore

Government
  - Body: Siana Gram Panchayat

Population (2011)
  - Total: 11,004

Languages
  - Official: Hindi, Marwari
- Time zone: UTC+5:30 (IST)
- PIN: 343024
- Telephone code: 02973
- ISO 3166 code: RJ-IN
- Vehicle registration: RJ-16
- Sex ratio: 952 ♂/♀
- Lok Sabha constituency: Jalore (Lok Sabha Constituency)
- Vidhan Sabha constituency: Jalore
- Civic agency: Siana Gram Panchayat

Siana (also spelt as Siyana) is a village in the Jalore district of Rajasthan. It is located 36km south east of district headquarters Jalore town. Two important tourist destinations of Rajasthan Mount Abu and Jodhpur are 125 km and 180 km from Siana.

== Demographics ==
As of 2001 India census, Siana had a population of 9,994. Males constitute 5,032 of the population and females 4,962.
