= Qi Ying (sport shooter) =

Chinese sport shooter

Personal information
- Nationality: China
- Born: 23 January 1997 (age 29) Zibo, Shandong, China
- Height: 1.8 m (5 ft 11 in)
- Weight: 90 kg (198 lb)

Sport
- Sport: Shooting
- Event: Trap
Medal record
Men's trap shooting
Representing China
Olympic Games
Silver medal – second place	2024 Paris	Trap
World Championships
Silver medal – second place	2018 Changwon	Double trap team
Bronze medal – third place	2026 Doha	Trap
Asian Games
Gold medal – first place	2022 Hangzhou	Trap
Bronze medal – third place	2022 Hangzhou	Trap team
Bronze medal – third place	2026 Aichi-Nagoya	Trap
Bronze medal – third place	2026 Aichi–Nagoya	Trap mixed team
Asian Championships
Gold medal – first place	2022 Almaty	Trap team
Gold medal – first place	2023 Changwon	Trap
Gold medal – first place	2025 Shymkent	Trap
Bronze medal – third place	2022 Almaty	Trap mixed team
Bronze medal – third place	2023 Changwon	Trap mixed team

Qi Ying (simplified Chinese: 齐迎; traditional Chinese: 齊迎; pinyin: Qí Yíng; born 23 January 1997) is a Chinese sport shooter.
