= Saniya Shaikh =

Indian sport shooter

Personal information
- National team: India
- Citizenship: India
- Born: 25 April 1992 (age 34) Meerut, Uttar Pradesh
- Education: Lady Shri Ram College for Women
- Height: 169 cm (5 ft 7 in) (As of October 2017)
- Weight: 54 kg (119 lb) (As of October 2017)

Sport
- Sport: Women's Skeet, Shooting
Medal record
Women's shooting
Representing India
Asian Championships
Silver medal – second place	2017 Astana	Skeet team
Bronze medal – third place	2019 Doha	Skeet team

Saniya Shaikh (born 25 April 1992) is an international shooter, representing India in Women Skeet (SK75) (SK125) event in International Shooting Sport Federation.

== Family ==
Sanya is the 3rd generation shooter in the family, starting with her grandfather Lt. Mohammed Mateen Shaikh who was a hunter in early days, her father Mohammed Sualeyheen Sheikh, who also acts as her coach. Saniya's brother Hamaza Shaikh is also a shooter, her cousins are also international shooters Mohammed Saif Sheikh and Mohammed Sheeraz Sheikh.

Together, the family has even created their own Gun house, known as "Mateen Gun House" in the town of Meerut.

== Achievements ==
Rk	Cs City Year	Event	Cat	Comp	Final	Total	Record			
8	WCH NICOSIA 2007	SK75	Junior	65		65				
13	WCH MARIBOR 2009	SK75	Junior	63		63				
54	WCH MOSCOW 2017	SK75		60						
9	WC ACAPULCO 2013	SK75		66						
22	WC MINSK 2009	SK75		54		54				
23	WC MARIBOR 2007	SK75		63		63				
24	WC CONCEPCION 2011	SK75		64		64				
25	WC TUCSON 2014	SK75		64						
25	WC BEIJING 2010	SK75		45		45				
25	WC CAIRO 2009	SK75		59		59				
27	WC NEW DELHI 2017	SK75		60						
30	WC NICOSIA 2013	SK75		64						
31	WC NICOSIA 2016	SK75		65						
33	WC ACAPULCO 2015	SK75		55						
34	WC MUNICH 2009	SK75		59		59				
37	WC LONATO 2007	SK75		61		61				
38	WC AL AIN 2015	SK75		65						
39	WC GRANADA 2013	SK75		61						
42	WC AL AIN 2013	SK75		63						
43	WC BEIJING 2011	SK75		59		59				
45	WC SYDNEY 2011	SK75		56		56				
50	WC MUNICH 2014	SK75		57						
3	ASC JAIPUR 2008	SK75		62	20	82				
4	ASC PATIALA 2012	SK75		65	21	86				
6	ASC MANILA 2007	SK75		63	19	82				
15	ASC ASTANA 2017	SK75		58						
16	ASC DOHA 2012	SK75		61		61				
17	ASC ABU DHABI 2016	SK75		61						
17	ASC KUWAIT 2007	SK75		59		59	4	CWG2018	SK75	11

She has won a number of events for the country, however she didn't qualify for the 2020 Olympic Games at Tokyo, missing out on a potential quota place for India at the Asian Olympic Qualifying Championships.

== See also ==
Heena Sidhu
