= Shapath Bharadwaj =

Indian sport shooter (born 2002)

Personal information
- Full name: Shapath Bharadwaj
- Nationality: Indian
- Born: 2002 (age 22–23); Meerut, India
- Height: 1.8 m (5 ft 11 in)
- Weight: 80 kg (180 lb)

Sport
- Country: India
- Sport: Shooting
- Event: Double Trap

Shapath Bharadwaj (born 2 January 2002) is an Indian sport shooter. He won the bronze medal at the ISSF World Championship in Jr. Men's Double Trap Category at the age of 16. He currently holds a Senior World Rank 18 & Asian Ranking 8 in Double Trap Shooting.
