= Prithviraj Tondaiman =

Indian sport shooter

Medal record

Men's shooting

Representing India

Asian Championships
Gold medal – first place	2012 Patiala	Trap team
Gold medal – first place	2023 Changwon	Mixed trap team
Silver medal – second place	2016 Abu Dhabi	Trap team
Silver medal – second place	2019 Doha	Trap team
Silver medal – second place	2023 Changwon	Trap team
Bronze medal – third place	2015 Kuwait City	Trap team

Prithviraj Tondaiman (born 6 June 1987) is an Indian sport shooter from Tamil Nadu. He competes in the trap discipline. He was a part of the Indian shooting team at the 2022 Asian Games, Hangzhou, China.

== Early life and education ==
Tondaiman is from Pukukkottai, Tamil Nadu. His father Rajagopala Tondaiman is also a shooter and comes from a lineage of Maharaja of Pudukkottai. He completed his MBA at SRM Institute of Technology and Science, Vadapalani campus, in 2012.

== Career ==
In July 2023, he won the bronze medal in the men's trap event at the ISSF World Cup Shotgun in Lonato, Italy. He is the only Indian to ever get a medal at this event. Earlier, in March 2023, he also won a bronze at the ISSF Shotgun World Cup at Doha.
