= Zoravar Singh Sandhu =

Indian trap shooter (born 1977)

Personal information
- Born: 7 August 1977 (age 48) Muchhal, Amritsar, Punjab, India
- Education: The Lawrence School
- Height: 1.83 m (6 ft 0 in)

Sport
- Sport: Shooting
- Event: Trap
Medal record
Men's shooting
Representing India
World Championships
Bronze medal – third place	2025 Athens	Trap
World Cup
Silver medal – second place	2022 Nicosia	Trap team
Asian Games
Gold medal – first place	2022 Hangzhou	Trap team
Silver medal – second place	1998 Bangkok	Trap team
Bronze medal – third place	2010 Guangzhou	Trap team
Asian Championships
Gold medal – first place	2013 Almaty	Trap team
Silver medal – second place	2016 Abu Dhabi	Trap team
Silver medal – second place	2023 Changwon	Trap team
South Asian Games
Gold medal – first place	2004 Islamabad	Trap
Gold medal – first place	2004 Islamabad	Trap team

Zoravar Singh Sandhu (born 7 August 1977) is an Indian trap shooter. He was part of the Indian trap team that won gold at the 2013 Asian Championships and the 2022 Asian Games. He won a bronze medal in the trap event at the 2025 World Championships, in his 13th appearance at the event since his debut in 1998.
