= Zain Amat =

Singaporean sport shooter

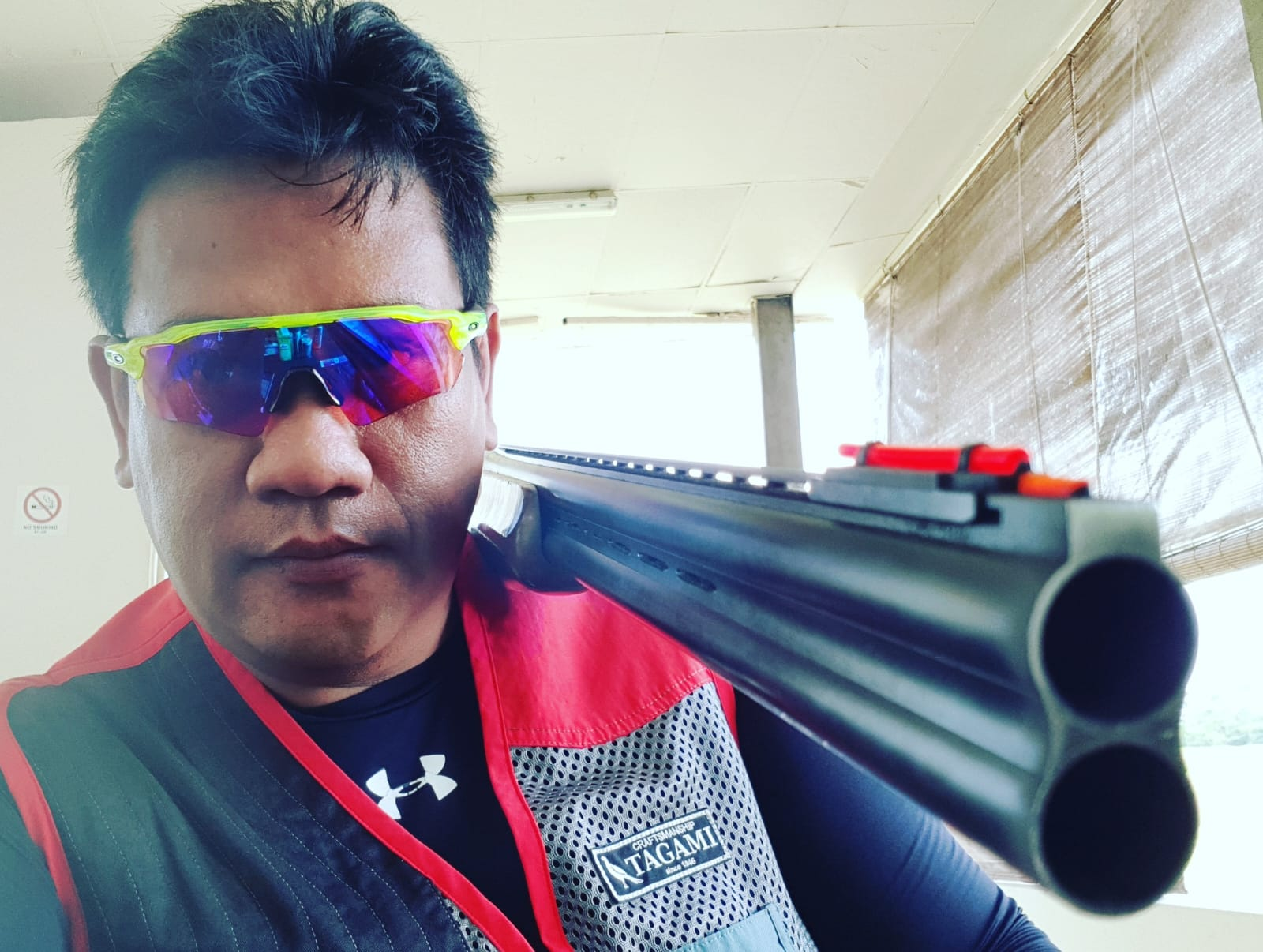
- Born: May 10, 1975 (age 51); Singapore
- Known for: Representing Singapore in shooting in numerous international competitions
- Height: 1.80 m (5 ft 11 in)

Zain Amat (born May 10, 1975) is a retired Singaporean trap shooter, formerly specializing in the Olympic Double Trap. He has represented Singapore since 2004 as part of the Singapore Clay Shooting Team.

== Education ==
Amat studied at Raffles Institution and Nanyang Junior College.

== Career ==
At the 2005 Southeast Asian Games, Amat won an individual gold medal in Double Trap.

In the 2007 Southeast Asian Games, having switched to Olympic Trap from mid-2006, he won the individual and team Olympic Trap event; beating teammate Lee Wung Yew and Thailand's Atig Kitcharoen for the individual gold medal. Amat was also in the team that won the Olympic Double Trap team gold medal. Together with teammates Lee Wung Yew and Choo Choon Seng, Amat became a select group of SEA Games shooting athlete who have won both individual trap and double trap titles.

Amat won the Meritorious Award for Sports in 2006 and 2008.

In 2015, Amat, alongside Choo Choon Seng and Lin Hejun, won the gold medal at the men's team trap during the 2015 SEA Games.

As of March 2018, he has retired from the Singapore Shooting Team.
