= Kynan Chenai =

Indian shooter in the Trap discipline

Kynan Chenai OLY
Personal information
- Full name: Kynan Darius Chenai
- National team: India
- Born: 29 January 1991 (age 35) Hyderabad, India

Sport
- Sport: Shooting
- Event: Trap
Medal record
Men's shooting
Representing India
Asian Games
Gold medal – first place	2022 Hangzhou	Team
Gold medal – first place	2026 Aichi–Nagoya	Mixed team
Bronze medal – third place	2022 Hangzhou	Team
World Cup
Bronze medal – third place	2025 Nicosia	Mixed team
Asian Championships
Silver medal – second place	2012 Doha	Team
Silver medal – second place	2019 Doha	Team
Silver medal – second place	2023 Changwon	Team
Bronze medal – third place	2015 Kuwait City	Team
Asian Shotgun Championships
Silver medal – second place	2016 Abu Dhabi	Team
Bronze medal – third place	2017 Astana	Individual
Bronze medal – third place	2017 Astana	Mixed team
Commonwealth Youth Games
Gold medal – first place	2008 Pune	Individual

Kynan Darius Chenai (born 29 January 1991) is an Indian sport shooter specializing in trap shooting. He has represented India in multiple international competitions, including the Olympics and the Asian Games. He competed in the 2016 Summer Olympics, where he finished 19th in the men's trap event. At the 2022 Asian Games, Chenai won a gold medal in the men's trap team event and a bronze medal in the individual trap event, contributing significantly to India's record-breaking medal tally in shooting in that edition.

== Early life ==
Kynan was born to a reputed Parsi family in Hyderabad, India. His father Darius Chenai is a former national shooting champion in Trap discipline and a businessman. He studied in Hebron School in Ooty, Tamil Nadu with German as elected foreign language. During his school days, he was part of the Field Hockey Team and Football Team, and also the school's freestyle swimming champion for three years. He spent 1 year at Brunel where he tried to play hockey

== Athletic career ==
In 2003, he took up shooting and was initially coached by his father. Later he was coached by four-time Olympic champion Mansher Singh. He won the gold medal in Junior Men's Trap shooting event at the 50th and the 51st National Shooting Championship in India. He also won a gold medal in the Trap event in the 2008 Commonwealth Youth Games.

Kynan achieved an Olympic quota for the 2016 Summer Olympics after finishing fourth in the Asia Olympic Shooting qualifiers in Delhi on 28 January 2016, where he finished 19th in the men's trap qualification round.
