= Joe Salem (sport shooter) =

Lebanese sports shooter

Personal information
- Nationality: Lebanese
- Born: 29 September 1960 (age 65) Beirut, Lebanon

Sport
- Sport: Sports shooting
Medal record
Men's shooting
Representing Lebanon
Asian Games
Silver medal – second place	2010 Guangzhou	Trap team
Bronze medal – third place	2006 Doha	Trap team
Bronze medal – third place	2010 Guangzhou	Trap

Joe Salem (born 29 September 1960) is a Lebanese sports shooter. He competed in the men's trap event at the 2000 Summer Olympics.

He participated at the Asian Games from 1998 to 2014 and won three medals.
