= Lee Wung Yew =

Singaporean sport shooter (born 1966)

Personal information
- Nationality: Singapore
- Born: 19 March 1966 (age 60) Singapore
- Height: 1.88 m (6 ft 2 in)
- Weight: 90 kg (198 lb)

Sport
- Sport: Shooting
- Event(s): Trap, double trap
- Club: Safra Shooting Club
- Coached by: Zhu Chang Fu
Medal record
Men's shooting
Representing Singapore
Asian Games
Bronze medal – third place	1998 Bangkok	Double trap team
Asian Championships
Bronze medal – third place	2007 Kuwait City	Trap
Southeast Asian Games
Gold medal – first place	1995 Bangkok	Trap
Gold medal – first place	1997 Jakarta	Trap
Gold medal – first place	1997 Jakarta	Double trap
Gold medal – first place	2003 Hanoi	Double trap
Silver medal – second place	2003 Hanoi	Trap
Silver medal – second place	2005 Manila	Trap
Bronze medal – third place	2007 Bangkok	Trap

Lee Wung Yew, PBM BBM (Chinese: 李宏耀; pinyin: Lǐ Hóngyào; born 19 March 1966) is a Singaporean sport shooter. He is a three-time Olympian, a six-time Asian Games competitor, and a thirteen-time Southeast Asian Games medalist (1985–2009). Because of his long-term success and full commitment to the sport, Lee was named Singapore's Sportsman of the Year in 1990 and in 1998. He was also conferred the Public Service Medal and Public Service Star for his contribution to sports. He is currently a Senior Teacher at Assumption English School teaching Physical Education.

== Shooting career ==
Lee started his sporting career at the age of fifteen, when his father Lee Eng Hong convinced him to shoot a gun. Four years later, Lee qualified for the 1985 Southeast Asian Games in Bangkok, Thailand, where he won a gold medal, as a member of the Singaporean shooting team, in men's trap shooting. At the 1989 Southeast Asian Games in Kuala Lumpur, Malaysia, Lee captured his first ever individual gold medal in the same discipline, striking a total of 181 clay pigeons. In 1992, Lee graduated from Nanyang Technological University, with a bachelor's degree in physical education and a master of business administration degree major in sports management.

Lee made his official debut for the 1996 Summer Olympics in Atlanta, Georgia, where he became the nation's flag bearer in the opening ceremonies. He placed twentieth in the first ever men's trap shooting, with a score of 119 clay pigeons, tying his position with ten other shooters including United States' Bret Erickson and Kuwait's Fehaid Al Deehani. The following year, Lee reached his breakthrough season in shooting, when he captured four gold medals in both trap and double trap at the Southeast Asian Games in Jakarta, Indonesia. At the 1998 Asian Games in Thailand, Lee won a bronze medal in the double trap team event alongside Chng Seng Mok and Tan Chee Keong, giving Singapore its first medal of the Games. Lee also competed for the second time in the men's trap at the 2004 Summer Olympics in Athens, where he placed twenty-first out of thirty-five shooters in the preliminary rounds, striking a total of 115 clay pigeons.

Twelve years after competing in his first Olympics, Lee qualified for his third Singaporean team, as a 42-year-old, at the 2008 Summer Olympics in Athens, by placing third from the 2007 Asian Shooting Championships in Kuwait City, Kuwait, with a total of 133 birds. He scored a total of 110 clay pigeons in the preliminary rounds of the men's trap, by three points ahead of Ireland's Derek Burnett from the final attempt, finishing only in twenty-eighth place.
