= Talal Al-Rashidi =

Kuwaiti sport shooter

Personal information
- Nationality: Kuwaiti
- Born: 24 July 1993 (age 33) Kuwait City, Kuwait
- Height: 1.80 m (5 ft 11 in)
- Weight: 75 kg (165 lb)

Sport
- Country: Kuwait
- Sport: Shooting
- Event: Trap
- Club: Kuwait Shooting Club
Medal record
Men's shooting
Representing Kuwait
World Championships
| Gold medal – first place | 2018 Changwon | Trap team |
| Gold medal – first place | 2026 Doha | Trap team |
| Silver medal – second place | 2014 Granada | Trap team |
World Shotgun Championships
| Silver medal – second place | 2019 Lonato del Garda | Trap team |
Asian Games
| Gold medal – first place | 2026 Asian Games | Trap team |
| Silver medal – second place | 2022 Hangzhou | Trap |
| Silver medal – second place | 2022 Hangzhou | Trap team |
Asian Championships
| Gold medal – first place | 2012 Doha | Trap team |
| Gold medal – first place | 2015 Kuwait City | Trap team |
| Gold medal – first place | 2019 Doha | Trap |
| Gold medal – first place | 2019 Doha | Trap team |
| Gold medal – first place | 2025 Shymkent | Trap team |
| Silver medal – second place | 2012 Doha | Trap |
| Bronze medal – third place | 2015 Kuwait City | Trap |
| Bronze medal – third place | 2023 Changwon | Mixed trap team |
Asian Shotgun Championships
| Gold medal – first place | 2017 Astana | Trap team |
| Gold medal – first place | 2018 Kuwait City | Trap team |
| Gold medal – first place | 2022 Almaty | Mixed trap team |
| Silver medal – second place | 2016 Abu Dhabi | Trap |
| Silver medal – second place | 2017 Astana | Trap |
| Silver medal – second place | 2022 Almaty | Trap team |
| Bronze medal – third place | 2014 Al-Ain | Trap team |
| Bronze medal – third place | 2024 Kuwait City | Trap team |
Islamic Solidarity Games
| Silver medal – second place | 2021 Konya | Trap |
| Silver medal – second place | 2021 Konya | Mixed trap team |

Talal Al-Rashidi (born 24 July 1993) is a Kuwaiti professional target shooter. He competed in the trap event at the 2012 Summer Olympics.

Al-Rashidi qualified for the 2012 Summer Olympics shooting events when he won a silver medal at the 2012 Asian Shooting Championships.
