= Bernard Yeoh =

Malaysian sport shooter

Personal information
- Full name: Bernard Yeoh Cheng Han
- Nationality: Malaysia
- Born: 24 August 1970 (age 55) Kuala Lumpur, Malaysia
- Height: 1.75 m (5 ft 9 in)
- Weight: 95 kg (209 lb)

Sport
- Sport: Shooting
- Event: Trap (TR125)
- Club: A1 Shooting Ground
- Coached by: Claudio Capaldo
Medal record
Representing Malaysia
Men's shooting
Southeast Asian Games
Silver medal – second place	2015 Singapore	Trap team
Silver medal – second place	2017 Kuala Lumpur	Trap
Silver medal – second place	2019 Philippines	Trap team

Bernard Yeoh Cheng Han (born August 24, 1970 in Kuala Lumpur) is a Malaysian sport shooter and restaurateur. He was selected to compete for Malaysia in trap shooting at the 2004 Summer Olympics, finishing in thirty-fourth place. Yeoh is a member of the A1 Shooting Ground in Barnet, England, United Kingdom, where he trains full-time under Italian-born coach Claudio Capaldo.

Yeoh qualified for the Malaysian squad, as a 35-year-old, in the men's trap at the 2004 Summer Olympics in Athens after having accepted a wildcard entry invitation from the International Shooting Sport Federation. He fired 107 out of 125 targets to finish thirty-fourth in the qualifying phase, failing to advance to the final.

Yeoh is also the proprietor of Kai Mayfair in London, a fine dining Chinese restaurant which has held 1 Michelin star since 2009. He opened the restaurant in 1993.
