= Lee Young-sik =

South Korean sport shooter

Medal record

Men's shooting

Representing South Korea

Asian Championships
Gold medal – first place	2007 Kuwait City	Trap
Gold medal – first place	2007 Kuwait City	Trap team
Gold medal – first place	2015 Kuwait City	Trap

Lee Young-Sik (born 1 March 1973) is a South Korean sport shooter who specializes in the trap.

At the 2008 Olympic Games he finished in joint thirteenth place in the trap qualification, missing a place among the top six, who progressed to the final round.
