= Manavjit Singh Sandhu =

Indian sport shooter

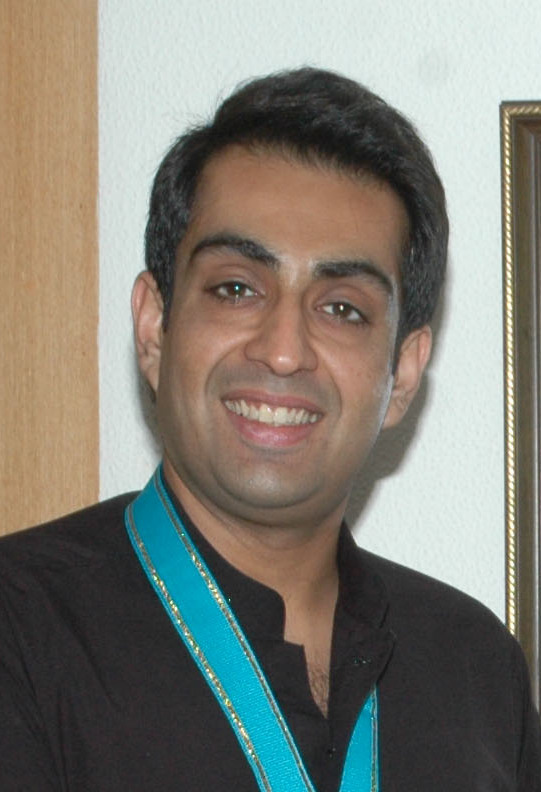
- Sandhu in 2009

Personal information
- Born: 3 November 1976 (age 49) Amritsar, Punjab
- Height: 6 ft 4 in (193 cm)
- Weight: 198 lb (90 kg)
Medal record
Men's shooting
Representing India
World Championships
Gold medal – first place	2006 Zagreb	Trap
Silver medal – second place	2006 Zagreb	Trap team)
Asian Games
Silver medal – second place	1998 Bangkok	Trap team
Silver medal – second place	2002 Busan	Trap team
Silver medal – second place	2006 Doha	Trap
Silver medal – second place	2006 Doha	Trap team
Bronze medal – third place	2010 Guangzhou	Trap team
Asian Championships
Gold medal – first place	2012 Doha	Trap
Silver medal – second place	2012 Doha	Trap team
Silver medal – second place	2019 Doha	Trap team
Bronze medal – third place	2015 Kuwait City	Trap team
Asian Shotgun Championships
Gold medal – first place	2009 Almaty	Trap
Gold medal – first place	2012 Patiala	Trap
Gold medal – first place	2012 Patiala	Trap team
Gold medal – first place	2013 Almaty	Trap team
Silver medal – second place	2009 Almaty	Trap team
Silver medal – second place	2011 Kuala Lumpur	Trap team
Bronze medal – third place	2013 Almaty	Trap
Commonwealth Games
Gold medal – first place	1998 Kuala Lumpur	Trap team
Silver medal – second place	2002 Busan	Trap team
Silver medal – second place	2010 Delhi	Trap team
Bronze medal – third place	2006 Melbourne	Trap
Bronze medal – third place	2010 Delhi	Trap
Bronze medal – third place	2014 Glasgow	Trap

Manavjit Singh Sandhu (born 3 November 1976) is an Indian sport shooter who specializes in trap shooting. He is a Rajiv Gandhi Khel Ratna Awardee in 2006 and Arjuna Awardee in 1998. He is a 4 time Olympian, having represented India at the Athens 2004 Summer Olympics, Beijing 2008 Summer Olympics the London 2012 Summer Olympics and the Rio 2016 Summer Olympics. He is former World No. 1 ranked Trap Shooter.

In November 2016, Perazzi announced Manavjit Singh Sandhu as their brand ambassador.

Sandhu was educated at the Lawrence School, Sanawar. and Delhi Public School, R. K. Puram.

He belongs to the village Ratta Khera Punjab Singh Wala in the district of Firozpur, Punjab. His father is Gurbir Singh and his uncles are Randhir Singh and Parambir Singh.

He won the gold medal at the 2006 ISSF World Shooting Championships, becoming the first Indian shotgun shooter to be crowned World Champion.

He has won four silver medals at 1998 Asian Games, 2002 Asian Games and 2006 Asian Games.

He won the gold medal at 1998 Commonwealth Games and the bronze medal in the trap event at the 2006 Commonwealth Games.

He has won six gold medals at the Asian Clay Shooting Championships.

At the 2008 Olympics he finished in 12th place, having finished tied 19th at the 2004 Olympics.

In 2010, he won the Commonwealth Shooting Championship gold and the very next week won gold at the World Cup 2010 in Mexico.

As of 2 April 2010, he is ranked #3 in the world. His highest ranking has been World #1 in 2006.

His career in shooting started early and his interest developed mainly due to his father Gurbir Singh Sandhu who is an Olympian and Arjuna Awardee. His education is from the Lawrence School Sanawar. He further has studied at the YPS Chandigarh, Delhi Public School, R. K. Puram and the Venkateswara College, Delhi University.

He was awarded Rajiv Gandhi Khel Ratna award for 2006–2007, Indian's highest honour given for achievements in sports.

He won the gold medal at the World Cup 2014, Tucson, US, on 11 April 2014.

Sandhu competed at the Rio 2016 Summer Olympics, where he finished at 16th place in the men's trap qualification round.

He holds the Asian Record of 124/125 Targets.
