= Jethro Dionisio =

Filipino sport shooter

Jethro Dionisio (born January 24, 1972, in Manila, National Capital Region) is a shooter from the Philippines. Nicknamed The Jet, he represented the country in the 2004 Summer Olympics. He is also a famous practical shooter, having won the country's nationals several times starting at the age of 16. At 18, he competed, and won the U.S. Steel Challenge World Speed Shooting Competition (1990). He would go on and win two more times, 1992-1993. He is only 1 of 5 people, male and female, to have won the competition more than 2 times.

== See also ==
- Philippines at the 2004 Summer Olympics
- Steel Challenge
