= Khaled Al-Mudhaf =

Kuwaiti sport shooter (born 1978)

Personal information
- Nationality: Kuwaiti
- Born: 12 June 1978 (age 48) Kuwait City, Kuwait
- Height: 1.63 m (5 ft 4 in)
- Weight: 105 kg (231 lb)

Sport
- Country: Kuwait
- Sport: Shooting
- Event: Trap (TR125)
- Club: Kuwait City Shooting Club
- Coached by: Rustam Yambulatov
Medal record
Men's shooting
Representing Kuwait
World Championships
Gold medal – first place	2002 Lahti	Trap
Gold medal – first place	2007 Nicosia	Trap team
Gold medal – first place	2018 Changwon	Trap team
Gold medal – first place	2026 Doha	Trap team
Silver medal – second place	2019 Lonato del Garda	Trap team
Bronze medal – third place	2019 Lonato del Garda	Trap
Bronze medal – third place	2023 Baku	Trap
Asian Games
Gold medal – first place	1998 Bangkok	Trap team
Gold medal – first place	2006 Doha	Trap team
Gold medal – first place	2026 Aichi-Nagoya	Trap
Gold medal – first place	2026 Aichi-Nagoya	Trap team
Silver medal – second place	2014 Incheon	Trap team
Silver medal – second place	2022 Hangzhou	Trap team
Bronze medal – third place	2006 Doha	Trap
Asian Championships
Gold medal – first place	2012 Doha	Trap team
Gold medal – first place	2019 Doha	Trap team
Silver medal – second place	2007 Kuwait City	Trap team
Silver medal – second place	2019 Doha	Trap
Asian Shotgun Championships
Gold medal – first place	2009 Almaty	Trap team
Gold medal – first place	2016 Abu Dhabi	Trap
Gold medal – first place	2017 Astana	Trap team
Gold medal – first place	2018 Kuwait City	Trap team
Silver medal – second place	1996 Shanghai	Trap
Silver medal – second place	1997 Brunei	Trap
Silver medal – second place	1999 Kuwait City	Trap
Silver medal – second place	2001 Bangkok	Trap
Silver medal – second place	2003 New Delhi	Trap
Silver medal – second place	2005 Bangkok	Trap
Silver medal – second place	2007 Manila	Trap
Silver medal – second place	2009 Almaty	Trap
Silver medal – second place	2013 Almaty	Trap team
Silver medal – second place	2019 Almaty	Trap team
Bronze medal – third place	2004 Kuala Lumpur	Trap
Bronze medal – third place	2011 Kuala Lumpur	Trap
Bronze medal – third place	2011 Kuala Lumpur	Trap team
Representing the Athletes from Kuwait
Asian Games
Gold medal – first place	2010 Guangzhou	Trap team
Silver medal – second place	2010 Guangzhou	Trap

Khaled Al-Mudhaf (Arabic: خالد المضف; born 12 June 1978) is a Kuwaiti sport shooter. He captured the men's trap title at the 2002 ISSF World Championships in Lahti, Finland, and finished in the top six respectively on two successive editions of the Olympic Games (2000 and 2004). Apart from his World championship title, Al-Mudhaf also collected fourteen more medals to his career record, including two from the Asian Games (a silver in Guangzhou 2010 and a bronze in Doha 2006). Al-Mudhaf is a member of the Kuwait City Shooting Club, where he trains full-time under Russian-born coach Rustam Yambulatov.

== Career ==
Al-Mudhaf's Olympic debut came at the 2000 Summer Olympics in Sydney, where he placed fourth in the men's trap with a total score of 139, just a single clay away from the bronze medal won by Italy's Giovanni Pellielo.

Two years later, Al-Mudhaf reached the peak of his sporting career by claiming his first individual gold in a major international competition at the 2002 ISSF World Championships in Lahti, Finland. He hit a total of 146 targets to outplay the rest of the finalists field, including Pellielo and Olympic champion Michael Diamond for the trap title. Coming atop the podium, Al-Mudhaf also assured an Olympic quota for his native Kuwait, and was eventually selected to compete in his second Games.

At the 2004 Summer Olympics in Athens, Al-Mudhaf qualified for his second Kuwaiti team in the men's trap, after having achieved a minimum qualifying score of 122 from his top finish at the Worlds two years earlier. As one of the favorites vying for the Olympic medal in the sporting event, Al-Mudhaf put up another top-level effort with a qualifying score of 121 to take the fourth seed in the six-man finals, but fell out of the medals dismally to last under pressure after missing more targets than any other shooter in the field, finishing only with 141 hits.

After a disappointing Olympic feat, Al-Mudhaf came back to his noble form to pick up the bronze medal in the individual trap at the 2006 Asian Games in Doha, Qatar, and then upgraded to silver at the 2010 Asian Games in Guangzhou, attaining total scores of 128 and 137 clay pigeons respectively.
