= Mansher Singh =

Indian sport shooter (born 1965)

Mansher Singh OLY
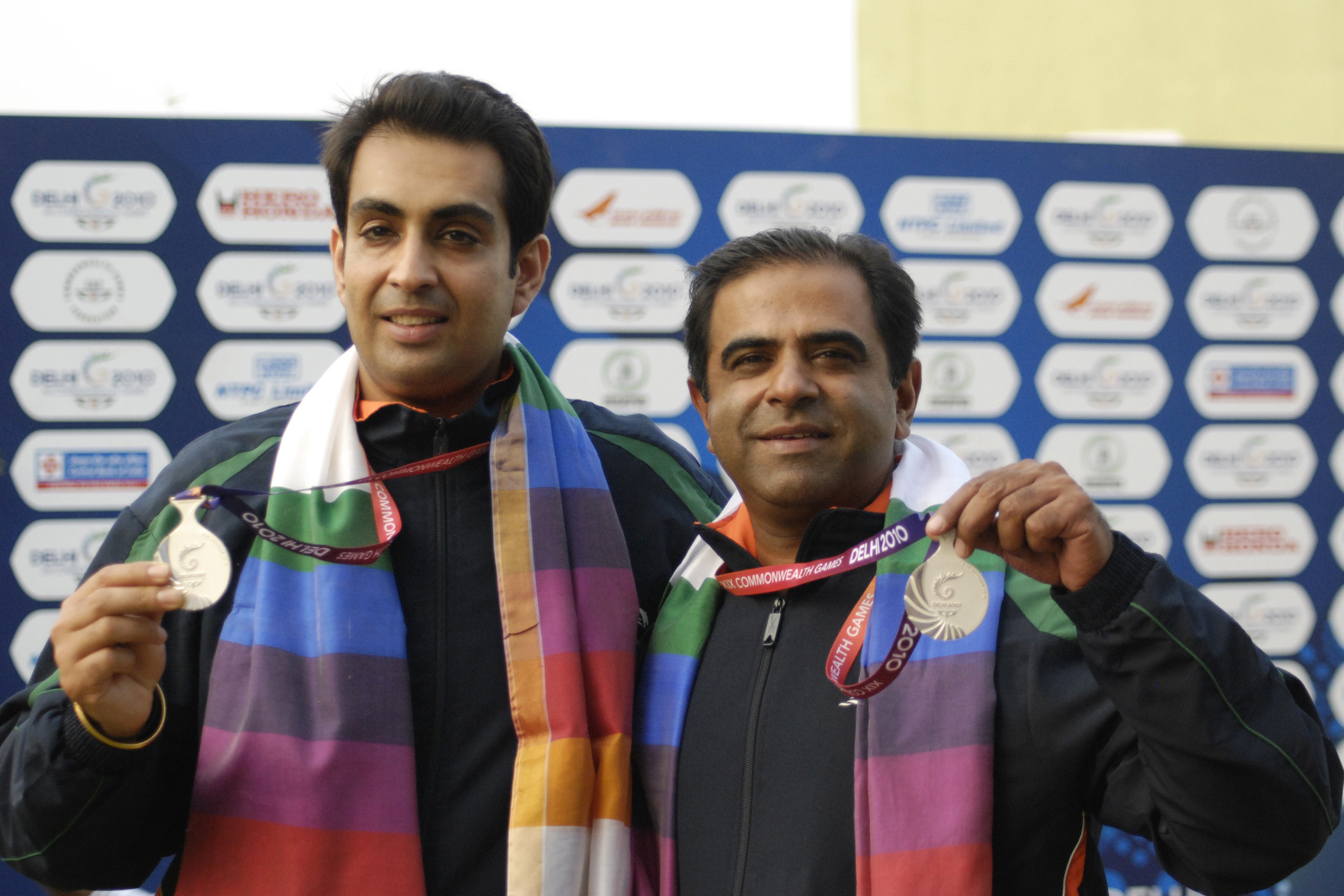
- Mansher Singh (right) with Manavjit Singh Sandhu at the Commonwealth Games in 2010.

Personal information
- Nickname: "Joey"
- National team: India
- Born: 1 December 1965 (age 60) Calcutta, India
- Education: St. Stephen's College, Delhi (BA)
- Occupation(s): Chief Shotgun Coach, Indian Olympic Team
- Years active: 1982 – present (44 years)
- Children: 2 (including Jaisal Singh)
- Parent: K.K. Singh (father)

Sport
- Sport: Sport Shooting
- Turned pro: 1982
- Coached by: Marcello Dradi
- Now coaching: Kynan Chenai
Medal record
Men's shooting
Representing India
Commonwealth Games
Gold medal – first place	1994 Victoria	Trap
Silver medal – second place	2010 New Delhi	Trap doubles
Asian Games
Silver medal – second place	1998 Bangkok	Trap team
Silver medal – second place	2002 Busan	Trap team
Silver medal – second place	2006 Doha	Trap team
Bronze medal – third place	2010 Guangzhou	Trap team
Asian Championships
Silver medal – second place	2012 Doha	Trap team
Asian Shotgun Championships
Gold medal – first place	2004 Bangkok	Trap
Gold medal – first place	2004 Kuala Lumpur	Trap
Gold medal – first place	2011 Kuala Lumpur	Trap
Gold medal – first place	2013 Almaty	Trap team
Silver medal – second place	1993 Manila	Trap
Silver medal – second place	2006 Singapore	Trap
Silver medal – second place	2009 Almaty	Trap team
Bronze medal – third place	1995 Jakarta	Trap
Bronze medal – third place	1995 Chendu City	Trap
Bronze medal – third place	2008 Jaipur	Trap
Bronze medal – third place	2009 Almaty	Trap

Mansher "Joey" Singh (born 1 December 1965 in Calcutta) is an Indian sport shooter who specializes in double trap and trap.

At the 2008 Olympic Games, he finished in first place in the trap qualification. He also came first at the 2004 Olympic Games. In addition, he has medals from the Asian Games and the Commonwealth Games. In the 1994 Commonwealth Games in Victoria, British Columbia, he won a gold medal in the trap event.

He also won the Arjuna Award in 1993.

== Education ==
Singh graduated from St. Columba's School, Delhi in 1985, before studying at St. Stephen's College, Delhi.

== Olympic Results ==
Olympic results
Event	1984	1996	2004	2008
Trap (200 birds)	35th 176/200	Event Style Changed		
Trap (125 birds)	Different; Event Style	31st 118/125	21st 115/125	8th 117/125
