= Mohammed Al-Rumaihi =

Qatari sports shooter

Mohammed Al Rumaihi
Personal information
- Nationality: Qatari
- Born: 3 March 1989 (age 37) Doha, Qatar
- Height: 187 cm (6 ft 2 in)

Sport
- Sport: Sports shooting
- Event: Trap
Medal record
Men's shooting
Representing Qatar
Asian Games
Silver medal – second place	2026 Aichi-Nagoya	Trap team
Silver medal – second place	2026 Aichi–Nagoya	Mixed trap team
Asian Championships
Gold medal – first place	2023 Changwon	Trap team
Silver medal – second place	2014 Al-Ain	Trap team
Silver medal – second place	2024 Kuwait City	Trap team
Silver medal – second place	2025 Shymkent	Double Trap team
Bronze medal – third place	2019 Doha	Trap team

Mohammed Al Rumaihi (Arabic: محمد الرميحي; born 3 March 1989) is a Qatari sports shooter. He finished 13th in the men's trap event at the 2020 Summer Olympics.
