= Abdulrahman Al-Faihan =

Kuwaiti sport shooter (born 1986)

Personal information
- Nationality: Kuwaiti
- Born: 24 June 1986 (age 40)

Sport
- Country: Kuwait
- Sport: Shooting
- Event: Trap
Medal record
Men's shooting
Representing Kuwait
World Championships
Gold medal – first place	2007 Nicosia	Trap team
Gold medal – first place	2018 Changwon	Trap team
Gold medal – first place	2026 Doha	Trap team
Gold medal – first place	2026 Doha	Trap
Silver medal – second place	2014 Granada	Trap team
Silver medal – second place	2019 Lonato del Garda	Trap team
Bronze medal – third place	2018 Changwon	Trap
Asian Games
Gold medal – first place	2006 Doha	Trap team
Gold medal – first place	2026 Aichi-Nagoya	Trap team
Silver medal – second place	2014 Incheon	Trap team
Silver medal – second place	2022 Hangzhou	Trap team
Asian Championships
Gold medal – first place	2015 Kuwait City	Trap team
Gold medal – first place	2019 Doha	Mixed trap team
Gold medal – first place	2025 Shymkent	Trap team
Silver medal – second place	2007 Kuwait City	Trap team
Asian Shotgun Championships
Gold medal – first place	2008 Jaipur	Trap
Gold medal – first place	2009 Almaty	Trap team
Gold medal – first place	2014 Al Ain	Trap
Gold medal – first place	2017 Astana	Trap
Gold medal – first place	2017 Astana	Trap team
Gold medal – first place	2018 Kuwait City	Trap team
Silver medal – second place	2012 Patiala	Trap team
Silver medal – second place	2013 Almaty	Trap team
Silver medal – second place	2018 Kuwait City	Mixed trap team
Silver medal – second place	2019 Almaty	Trap team
Silver medal – second place	2022 Almaty	Trap team
Bronze medal – third place	2016 Abu Dhabi	Trap
Bronze medal – third place	2024 Kuwait City	Trap team
Islamic Solidarity Games
Gold medal – first place	2021 Konya	Trap
Representing the Athletes from Kuwait
Asian Games
Gold medal – first place	2010 Guangzhou	Trap team

Abdulrahman Al Faihan (born 24 June 1986) is a Kuwaiti sport shooter who competed in the Men's Trap Shooting competition in the 2016 Summer Olympics. He participated within the Independent Olympic Athletes team.

== Career ==
In January 2016 he won a gold medal and an Olympic quota place while competing under the ISSF flag at the 2016 Asian Olympic Qualifying Tournament in New Delhi, India. The IOC had imposed a suspension on the Kuwait Olympic Committee in October 2015 as a result of legislation brought in by the Kuwaiti government that could have affected the autonomy of sporting organizations in the country.
