= Eric Ang =

Filipino sport shooter (born 1971)

Eric Ang (born February 2, 1971) is a shooter from the Philippines. He represented the country in the 2008 Summer Olympics. He lost in the contention for any medal by placing 30th on the qualifying rounds for Men's Trap on the second day of the games.

== See also ==
- Philippines at the 2008 Summer Olympics
