= Basketball at the 2026 Asian Games =

- Venue: Aichi International Arena
- Location: Nagoya, Aichi Prefecture, Japan
- Dates: 10 – 26 September 2026
- Nations: 16

Basketball at the 2026 Asian Games was held between 10 and 26 September at Aichi International Arena, in Kita-ku, Nagoya, Aichi Prefecture, Japan.

The men's tournament was the first event to be held during the Games, beginning on September 10, nine days ahead of the opening ceremony.

== Schedule ==
The schedule is as follows:

P	Preliminary round	¼	Quarterfinals	½	Semifinals	B	Bronze medal match	F	Gold medal match

Event↓/Date →	10th Thu	11th Fri	12th Sat	13th Sun	14th Mon	15th Tue	16th Wed	17th Thu	18th Fri	19th Sat	20th Sun		21st Mon	22nd Tue	23rd Wed	24th Thu	25th Fri	26th Sat	
Men	P					—N/a	¼	—N/a	½	—N/a	B	F	—N/a						
Women	—N/a							P							—N/a	¼	½	B	F

== Medal summary ==
=== Medal table ===
* Host nation (Japan)

Rank	Nation	Gold	Silver	Bronze	Total
1	South Korea	2	0	0	2
2	Japan*	0	2	0	2
3	China	0	0	1	1
3	Iran	0	0	1	1
Totals (4 entries)		2	2	2	6

=== Medalists ===
Event	Gold	Silver	Bronze
Men	South Korea; Lee Hyun-jung; Choi Jun-yong; Byeon Jun-hyeong; Lee Jung-hyun; Yu Ki-sang; Lee Woo-suk; Moon Jeong-hyeon; Yeo Jun-seok; Moon Yu-hyeon; Jang Jae-seok; Lee Seoung-hyun; Daniel Edi	Japan; Kotetsu Kurokawa; John Harper Jr. Ren Kanechika; Toyoshige Kano; Ibu Yamazaki; Yuto Kawashima; Kazuma Tsuya; Atsuya Ogawa; Avi Schafer; Jaheru Yamauchi; Alex Kirk; Shinji Takashima	Iran; Piter Girgoorian; Alireza Sharifi; Mobin Sheikhi; Navid Rezaeifar; Khashayar Aliakbarinamghi; Mohammad Heydari; Arman Zangeneh; Mohammad Jamshidi; Arsalan Kazemi; Matin Aghajanpour; Salar Monji; Mahdi Jafari
Women	South Korea; Heo Ye-eun; Kang Lee-seul; An He-ji; Choi I-saem; Jeong Hyun; Lee So-hee; Kang Yoo-lim; Park So-hee; Lee Hae-ran; Hong Yu-sun; Jin An	Japan; Riho Akagi; Miyu Okamoto; Maika Miura; Nana Santa; Mona Tateyama; Ami Tsuneta; Takako Sato; Mio Shiraishi; Ufuoma Tanaka; Maho Awatani; Suzuno Higuchi; Haru Owaki	China; Zhang Manman; Wang Siyu; Yang Shuyu; Deng Yuting; Tang Ziting; Luo Xinyu; Chen Yujie; Chen Mingling; Zhang Ziyu; Sun Yu; Liu Yutong; Jia Saiqi

== Draw ==
The participating teams and their groups were decided on 7 August 2026.

=== Men ===
Pool A

- Japan (hosts)
- South Korea
- Saudi Arabia
- Indonesia

Pool B

- Iran
- Jordan
- Chinese Taipei
- Qatar

Pool C

- China
- Philippines
- Bahrain
- Kazakhstan

=== Women ===
Pool A

- China
- Indonesia
- Thailand

Pool B

- Japan
- Philippines
- Kazakhstan
- Hong Kong

Pool C

- South Korea
- Chinese Taipei
- Mongolia
- Malaysia

== Participating teams ==
Nation	5x5	
Nation	Men	Women
Bahrain	Yes	—N/a
China	Yes	Yes
Chinese Taipei	Yes	Yes
Hong Kong	—N/a	Yes
Indonesia	Yes	Yes
Iran	Yes	—N/a
Japan	Yes	Yes
Jordan	Yes	—N/a
Kazakhstan	Yes	Yes
Malaysia	—N/a	Yes
Mongolia	—N/a	Yes
Philippines	Yes	Yes
Qatar	Yes	—N/a
Saudi Arabia	Yes	—N/a
South Korea	Yes	Yes
Thailand	—N/a	Yes
Total: 16 NOCs	12/12	11/11
