= Basketball at the 2026 Asian Games – Women's tournament =

Women's basketball at the 2026 Asian Games
- Venues: Aichi International Arena
- Dates: 17 – 26 September 2026
- Nations: 11

Medalists
gold medal	South Korea
silver medal	Japan
bronze medal	China

The women's 5-on-5 basketball tournament at the 2026 Asian Games was held in Kita-ku, Nagoya, Aichi Prefecture, Japan from 17 to 26 September 2026.

== Schedule ==
The schedule of the tournament is as follows.

G	Group phase	¼	Quarterfinals	½	Semifinals	B	Bronze medal match	F	Gold medal match

17th Thu	18th Fri	19th Sat	20th Sun	21st Mon	22nd Tue	23rd Wed	24th Thu	25th Fri	26th Sat	
G	G	G	G	G	G		¼	½	B	F

== Draw ==
The participating teams and matchups for the basketball competition were announced on 7 August 2026.

Group A
Pos	Team
A1	China
A2	Indonesia
A3	Thailand

Group B
Pos	Team
B1	Japan
B2	Philippines
B3	Kazakhstan
B4	Hong Kong

Group C
Pos	Team
C1	South Korea
C2	Chinese Taipei
C3	Mongolia
C4	Malaysia

== Squads ==
China	Chinese Taipei	Hong Kong	Indonesia
Zhang Manman; Wang Siyu; Yang Shuyu; Deng Yuting; Tang Ziting; Luo Xinyu; Chen Yujie; Chen Mingling; Zhang Ziyu; Sun Yu; Liu Yutong; Jia Saiqi	Chen Yen-Ju; Liu Hui-Ju; Lin Wen-Yu; Han Ya-En; Hsiao Yu-Wen; Huang Hsiang-Ting; Cheng I-Hsiu; Huang Ling-Chuan; Lin Yu-Ting; Peng Szu-Chin; Lin Tieh; Peng Hsiao-Tong	Chiu Ka Yu; Ng Yan Tung; Cheung Chor Ying; Yam Hui Yin; Tong Hiu Lui; Kwan Hoi Pui; Lau Sheung Hok; Li Tsz Kwan; Tsui Wing Yu; Christy Wong; Wong Nga Ting; Ma Tan Fung	Lea Kahol; Agustin Retong; Erinindita Madafa; Yualita Novia; Dewa Kusuma; Priscilla Karen; Faizzatus Shoimah; Jesslyn Aritonang; Nathania Orville; Kimberley Pierre-Louis; Nicole Lukito; Kartika Mahanani
Japan	Kazakhstan	Malaysia	Mongolia
Riho Akagi; Miyu Okamoto; Maika Miura; Nana Santa; Mona Tateyama; Ami Tsuneta; Takako Sato; Mio Shiraishi; Ufuoma Tanaka; Maho Awatani; Suzuno Higuchi; Haru Owaki	Alexandra Petelina; Tamara Noiok; Anastassiya Alishauskaite; Oxana Nurbayeva; Anna Bezgodova; Kamila Amanzholova; Nadezhda Yakovleva; Daria Koroleva; Adelya Mustafina; Milana Krutevich; Valeriya Kapitonova; Darya Tsukanova	Tan Sin Jie; Sammi Tan; Chia Mun Yi; Tan Pei Jei; Magdelene Low; Sandra Choe; Lim Jing Zhe; Trixie Teo; Foo Suet Ying; Chong Yin Yin; Yap Fook Yee; Joey Sim	Bat-erdene Ariuntsetseg; Battogtokh Unurzaya; Murat Bulbul; Bayarmaa Tsatsral; Tsendjav Bolortsetseg; Tuvshinjargal Ulemj; Onolbaatar Khulan; Baatar Bolor-erdene; Battsooj Bolor-erdene; Erdenebayan Narangoo; Amari Robinson; Baatar-erdene Anungoo
Philippines	South Korea	Thailand	
Afril Bernardino; Kent Pastrana; Janine Pontejos; Angelica Surada; Hazelle Yam; Stefanie Berberabe; Monique Del Carmen; Jhazmin Joson; Karl Pingol; Camille Clarin; Elizabeth Means; Camille Malagar	Heo Ye-eun; Kang Lee-seul; An He-ji; Choi I-saem; Jeong Hyun; Lee So-hee; Kang Yoo-lim; Park So-hee; Lee Hae-ran; Hong Yu-sun; Jin An	Pattanamon Patthanauckkaranon; Phantira Phanbot; Supavadee Kunchuan; Rattika Tojaruen; Yanisa Thankhokkruad; Sasiporn Wongtapha; Sarah Tuukkanen; Worakarn Wongwisetsak; Mathurot Dangdee; Chosita Sakaret; Laksamee Hewchaiyaphum; Priscilla Jensen	

== Group phase ==
All times are local, Japan Standard Time (UTC+9).

=== Group A ===
Pos	Team	Pld	W	L	PF	PA	PD	Pts	Qualification
1	China	2	2	0	221	87	+134	4	Quarterfinals
2	Indonesia	2	1	1	102	162	−60	3	Quarterfinals
3	Thailand	2	0	2	98	172	−74	2	Quarterfinals

Source: aichi-nagoya2026.org

17 September 2026
13:00

Report
Result

Indonesia	61–52	Thailand
Scoring by quarter: 14–13, 22–13, 13–11, 12–15
Pts: Pierre-Louis 14; Rebs: Pierre-Louis 16; Asts: Pierre-Louis 6		Pts: Kunchuan 20; Rebs: Jensen 6 Asts: Kunchuan 4

Aichi International Arena, Nagoya
Attendance: 4,488
Referees: Ami Takano (JPN), Yuen Chun Yip (HKG), Yana Nikogossyan (KAZ)

19 September 2026
10:00

Report
Result

Thailand	46–111	China
Scoring by quarter: 14–33, 14–24, 10–24, 8–30
Pts: Wongtapha 18; Rebs: Jensen 5 Asts: Wongtapha 3		Pts: Luo, Chen Y.J. 16; Rebs: Chen M.L. 9 Asts: Zhang 6

Aichi International Arena, Nagoya
Attendance: 4,382
Referees: Mahsa Kargari (IRN), Mandy Ngieng (MAS), Ami Takano (JPN)

21 September 2026
19:00

Report

China	110–41	Indonesia
Scoring by quarter: 19–13, 34–5, 27–9, 30–14
Pts: Zhang Ziyu 22; Rebs: Yang, Liu 10; Asts: Zhang Manman 10		Pts: Kusuma 8 Rebs: Kusuma 6 Asts: three players 2

Aichi International Arena, Nagoya
Referees: Mandy Ngieng (MAS), Yana Nikogossyan (KAZ), Rakesh Ramalingaiah (IND)

=== Group B ===
Pos	Team	Pld	W	L	PF	PA	PD	Pts	Qualification
1	Japan (H)	3	3	0	291	127	+164	6	Quarterfinals
2	Philippines	3	2	1	243	220	+23	5	Quarterfinals
3	Kazakhstan	3	1	2	161	251	−90	4	
4	Hong Kong	3	0	3	187	284	−97	3	

Source: aichi-nagoya2026.org
(H) Hosts

17 September 2026
16:00

Report
Results

Philippines	86–58	Kazakhstan
Scoring by quarter: 25–9, 24–23, 27–8, 10–18
Pts: Means 23; Rebs: Surada 5 Asts: Berberabe 8		Pts: Noiok 11; Rebs: Bezgodova 15; Asts: Koroleva 5

Aichi International Arena, Nagoya
Attendance: 1,549
Referees: Hu Jing (CHN), Budi Marfan (INA), Chuang Chih-Chun (TPE)

17 September 2026
19:00

Report
Results

Japan	114–37	Hong Kong
Scoring by quarter: 32–11, 37–6, 20–7, 25–13
Pts: Tateyama 26; Rebs: Okamoto 9 Asts: Higuchi 7		Pts: Kwan 10; Rebs: Tong 5 Asts: Li, Tsui 2

Aichi International Arena, Nagoya
Attendance: 1,549
Referees: Lee Ji-youn (KOR), Mandy Ngieng (MAS), Mahsa Kargari (IRI)

20 September 2026
10:00

Report
Results

Hong Kong	73–90	Philippines
Scoring by quarter: 21–21, 19–25, 20–23, 13–21
Pts: Li 30; Rebs: 3 players 5 Asts: Tsui 9		Pts: Berberabe 21; Rebs: Bernardino 11; Asts: Bernardino 4

Aichi International Arena, Nagoya
Attendance: 7,360
Referees: Lee Ji-youn (KOR), Budi Marfan (INA), Mandy Ngieng (MAS)

20 September 2026
13:50

Report
Results

Kazakhstan	23–88	Japan
Scoring by quarter: 9–23, 6–25, 5–23, 3–17
Pts: Amanzholova 6 Rebs: Bezgodova 6 Asts: Amanzholova 2		Pts: Owaki 16; Rebs: Okamoto, Tateyama 4 Asts: Akagi, Tsuneta 6

Aichi International Arena, Nagoya
Attendance: 7,360
Referees: Wissam Zein (SYR), Chuang Chih-Chun (TPE), Hu Jing (CHN)

22 September 2026
10:00

Report
Results

Kazakhstan	80–77 (OT)	Hong Kong
Scoring by quarter: 12–10, 17–19, 11–14, 25–28, Overtime: 12–9
Pts: Alishauskaite 22; Rebs: Bezgodova 15; Asts: Bezgodova 6		Pts: Li 32; Rebs: Li 9 Asts: Tong, Tsui 6

Aichi International Arena, Nagoya
Attendance: 5,993
Referees: Abdullah Alhejaili (KSA), Mahsa Kargari (IRI), Budi Marfan (INA)

22 September 2026
13:00

Report
Results

Japan	89–67	Philippines
Scoring by quarter: 24–11, 28–21, 16–18, 21–17
Pts: Okamoto 19; Rebs: Tanaka 8 Asts: Miura, Higuchi 5		Pts: Means 16; Rebs: Means 9 Asts: Berberabe 5

Aichi International Arena, Nagoya
Attendance: 5,897
Referees: Lee Jiyoun (KOR), Rabah Noujaim (LBN), Hu Jing (CHN)

=== Group C ===
Pos	Team	Pld	W	L	PF	PA	PD	Pts	Qualification
1	South Korea	3	3	0	267	160	+107	6	Quarterfinals
2	Chinese Taipei	3	2	1	233	199	+34	5	Quarterfinals
3	Mongolia	3	1	2	217	245	−28	4	Quarterfinals
4	Malaysia	3	0	3	180	293	−113	3	

Source: aichi-nagoya2026.org

18 September 2026
10:00

Report

South Korea	106–40	Malaysia
Scoring by quarter: 22–10, 37–12, 22–10, 25–8
Pts: Lee S. 21; Rebs: Hong 12; Asts: An 10		Pts: Chong 9 Rebs: Phey Chyi, Yap 4 Asts: Foo 6

Aichi International Arena, Nagoya
Attendance: 7,791
Referees: Mohammad Taha (JOR), Hu Jing (CHN), Abdullah Al-Hejaili (KSA)

18 September 2026
13:00

Report

Chinese Taipei	76–67	Mongolia
Scoring by quarter: 23–19, 18–27, 18–10, 17–11
Pts: Peng S. 15; Rebs: Hsiao 11; Asts: Peng H. 6		Pts: Robinson 25; Rebs: Robinson 13; Asts: O. Khulan 3

Aichi International Arena, Nagoya
Attendance: 7,791
Referees: Shigeyuki Arisawa (JPN), Mahsa Kargari (IRI), Rakesh RamalingaiaH (IND)

21 September 2026
13:00

Report

Mongolia	61–88	South Korea
Scoring by quarter: 9–28, 10–23, 19–16, 23–21
Pts: Robinson 22; Rebs: Robinson 4 Asts: Bayarmaa, Onolbaatar 4		Pts: Lee H. 20; Rebs: Hong Y. 4 Asts: Heo Y. 8

Aichi International Arena, Nagoya
Attendance: 3,863
Referees: Hu Jing (CHN), Glenn Cornelio (PHI), Abdullah Al-Hejaili (KSA)

21 September 2026
16:00

Report

Malaysia	59–98	Chinese Taipei
Scoring by quarter: 13–18, 11–32, 16–25, 19–23
Pts: Tan P. J. 19; Rebs: Sammi, Chia 5 Asts: Foo, Chong 3		Pts: Han 14; Rebs: Hsiao 14; Asts: Lin Y. T. 11

Aichi International Arena, Nagoya
Attendance: 3,863
Referees: Budi Marfan (INA), Ami Takano (JPN), Mahsa Kargari (IRI)

22 September 2026
16:00

Report

South Korea	73–59	Chinese Taipei
Scoring by quarter: 20–17, 22–12, 17–12, 14–18
Pts: Choi 17; Rebs: Lee S.-h. 9 Asts: Heo 6		Pts: Lin Y. T. 12; Rebs: Hsiao 6 Asts: Lin Y. T. 6

Aichi International Arena, Nagoya
Attendance: 5,883
Referees: Yana Nikogossyan (KAZ), Wissam Zein (SYR), Shigeyuki Arisawa (JPN)

22 September 2026
19:00

Report

Mongolia	89–81	Malaysia
Scoring by quarter: 18–14, 28–26, 20–9, 23–32
Pts: O. Khulan 31; Rebs: O. Khulan 12; Asts: Bat-erdene 7		Pts: Yap 16; Rebs: Tan S. 7 Asts: Tan S. 8

Aichi International Arena, Nagoya
Attendance: 5,883
Referees: Yuen Chun Yip (HKG), Mohammad Taha (JOR), Nattapong Jontapa (THA)

=== Ranking of third-place teams ===
Pos	Grp	Team	Pld	W	L	PF	PA	PD	Pts	Qualification
1	C	Mongolia	2	0	2	128	164	−36	2	Quarterfinals
2	A	Thailand	2	0	2	98	172	−74	2	Quarterfinals
3	B	Kazakhstan	2	0	2	81	174	−93	2	

Source: AsianGames2026.org

== Knockout stage ==
The record of each team will be compared to the records of other groups' teams that have the same group ranking as theirs. All teams will be ranked 1 to 11, with the first-placed teams from each group being 1–3, the second-place teams being 4–6, the third-place teams being 7–9, and the last-placed teams being 10–11. Only the top 8 teams qualify for the knockout stage. The top two teams (1 and 2) will play against one of the two best third-placed teams (7 and 8). The remaining matchups between ranks 3/4 and ranks 5/6 will be determined by a draw. Teams from the same group cannot play one another in the quarterfinals.

Since there were only 3 teams in group A, the result of the teams from groups B and C against the lowest-ranked teams in their group were disregarded.

=== Ranking ===
Pos	Grp	Team	Pld	W	L	PF	PA	PD	Pts	Qualification
1	A1	China	2	2	0	221	87	+134	4	Seeded (No draw)
2	B1	Japan	2	2	0	177	90	+87	4	Seeded (No draw)
3	C1	South Korea	2	2	0	161	120	+41	4	Seeded (Draw)
4	B2	Philippines	2	1	1	153	147	+6	3	Seeded (Draw)
5	C2	Chinese Taipei	2	1	1	135	140	−5	3	Unseeded (Draw)
6	A2	Indonesia	2	1	1	102	162	−60	3	Unseeded (Draw)
7	C3	Mongolia	2	0	2	128	164	−36	2	Unseeded (No draw)
8	A3	Thailand	2	0	2	98	172	−74	2	Unseeded (No draw)

Source: AsianGames2026.org
Rules for classification: 1) points; 2) points difference; 3) points scored.

=== Bracket ===
Quarterfinals
24 September
Chinese Taipei	83
Philippines	71
24 September
Japan	86
Thailand	29
24 September
China	89
Mongolia	63
24 September
South Korea	101
Indonesia	59

Semifinals
25 September
Chinese Taipei	52
Japan	80
25 September
China	80
South Korea	85

Gold medal
26 September
Japan	70
South Korea	75
Bronze medal
26 September
Chinese Taipei	64
China	77

=== Quarterfinals ===
24 September 2026
10:00

Report

South Korea	101–59	Indonesia
Scoring by quarter: 28–18, 24–12, 19–13, 30–16
Pts: Choi 16; Rebs: three players 5 Asts: Heo 8		Pts: Retong 14; Rebs: three players 4 Asts: Madafa 5

Aichi International Arena, Nagoya
Attendance: 3,922
Referees: Chuang Chih-Chun (TPE), Yuen Chun Yip (HKG), Ami Takano (JPN)

24 September 2026
13:00

Report

China	89–63	Mongolia
Scoring by quarter: 24–23, 25–5, 20–15, 20–20
Pts: Yang 21; Rebs: Zhang Z. 9 Asts: three players 5		Pts: Robinson 18; Rebs: Bulbul 9 Asts: four players 3

Aichi International Arena, Nagoya
Attendance: 3,686
Referees: Rakesh Ramalingaiah (IND), Glenn Cornelio (PHI), Mandy Ngieng (MAS)

24 September 2026
16:00

Report

Chinese Taipei	83–71	Philippines
Scoring by quarter: 15–9, 27–25, 23–22, 18–15
Pts: Hsiao 14; Rebs: Hsiao 17; Asts: Peng S. 5		Pts: Bernardino 23; Rebs: Bernardino 7 Asts: Berberabe 4

Aichi International Arena, Nagoya
Attendance: 2,137
Referees: Rabah Noujaim (LBN), Yana Nikogossyan (KAZ), Abdullah Alhejaili (KSA)

24 September 2026
19:20

Report

Japan	86–29	Thailand
Scoring by quarter: 20–6, 21–10, 22–6, 23–7
Pts: three players 13; Rebs: Tanaka 11; Asts: Miura, Higuchi 4		Pts: Wongtapha 10; Rebs: Jensen, Wongtapha 7 Asts: Kunchuan 4

Aichi International Arena, Nagoya
Attendance: 2,137
Referees: Lee Jiyoun (KOR), Hu Jing (CHN), Mahsa Kargari (IRI)

=== Semifinals ===
25 September 2026
16:00

Report

China	80–85	South Korea
Scoring by quarter: 19–17, 22–19, 24–25, 15–24
Pts: Zhang Z. 22; Rebs: Chen 10; Asts: Wang 10		Pts: Lee S. 23; Rebs: Lee H., Lee S. 6 Asts: Heo 9

Aichi International Arena, Nagoya
Attendance: 3,593
Referees: Mohammad Taha (JOR), Glenn Cornelio (PHI), Yana Nikogossyan (KAZ)

25 September 2026
19:20

Report

Chinese Taipei	52–80	Japan
Scoring by quarter: 11–20, 16–19, 13–23, 12–18
Pts: Lin Y. T. 9 Rebs: Hsiao Y. W. 7 Asts: Lin Y. T. 4		Pts: Miura 16; Rebs: Tanaka 10; Asts: Akagi 7

Aichi International Arena, Nagoya
Attendance: 3,593
Referees: Mahsa Kargari (IRN), Budi Marfan (INA), Mandy Ngieng (MAS)

=== Bronze medal game ===
26 September 2026
16:00

Report

Chinese Taipei	64–77	China
Scoring by quarter: 20–17, 16–19, 12–24, 16–17
Pts: Li Y. T. 15; Rebs: Hsiao 7 Asts: three players 3		Pts: Chen M. 20; Rebs: Luo 9 Asts: Luo, Yang 6

Aichi International Arena, Nagoya
Attendance: 7,089
Referees: Glenn Cornelio (PHI), Ami Takano (JPN), Abdullah Alhejaili (KSA)

=== Gold medal game ===
26 September 2026
19:20

Report

Japan	70–75	South Korea
Scoring by quarter: 15–27, 8–15, 28–21, 19–12
Pts: Owaki 23; Rebs: Owaki 13; Asts: Higuchi, Owaki 5		Pts: Lee H. 24; Rebs: Lee H. 9 Asts: An 7

Aichi International Arena, Nagoya
Attendance: 7,089
Referees: Wissam Zein (SYR), Mahsa Kargari (IRI), Mandy Ngieng (MAS)

== Final standing ==
Rank	Team	Pld	W	L
1st place, gold medalist(s)	South Korea	6	6	0
2nd place, silver medalist(s)	Japan	6	5	1
3rd place, bronze medalist(s)	China	5	4	1
4	Chinese Taipei	6	3	3
5	Philippines	4	2	2
6	Indonesia	3	1	2
7	Mongolia	4	1	3
8	Thailand	3	0	3
9	Kazakhstan	3	1	2
10	Hong Kong	3	0	3
11	Malaysia	3	0	3
