= Basketball at the 2021 Summer World University Games =

Basketball at the Chengdu 2021 FISU World University Games
- Venues: Various
- Dates: 28 July–6 August 2023
- Teams: 15 (men); 12 (women)

Basketball was contested at the 2021 Summer World University Games from 28 July to 6 August 2023 at 4 venues, which are listed in below, in Chengdu.

== Venue ==
Venue	City
Fenghuangshan Sports Park Gymnasium	Chengdu
Qingshuihe Campus Gymnasium	Chengdu
Sichuan Gymnasium	Chengdu
Qingbaijiang Sports Centre Gymnasium	Chengdu

== Qualification ==
Following the FISU regulations, The maximum of 16 teams in basketball events where the number of entries is larger than the authorised participation level will be selected by:

- The entry and the payment of guarantee;
- Those 8 teams who finishing top rankings of the previous edition will be automatically qualified;
- Those 4 teams finishing bottom rankings of the previous edition could be replaced by new applying teams;
- The host is automatically qualified;
- The remaining teams will be selected by wild card system according to geographical, continental representation, FISU ranking and FIBA ranking.

== Draw ==
Men's competition				Women's competition			
Pool A	Pool B	Pool C	Pool D	Pool A	Pool B	Pool C	Pool D
China	Argentina	Czech Republic	Azerbaijan	Japan	Chinese Taipei	Finland	China
Brazil	Mongolia	Japan	Finland	Argentina	Czech Republic	Brazil	Poland
Lithuania	Romania	Poland	South Korea	Hungary	Slovakia	Romania	Portugal
Chinese Taipei	South Africa	United States					

== Medal summary ==
=== Medal table ===
* Host nation (China)

Rank	Nation	Gold	Silver	Bronze	Total
1	China (CHN)*	1	0	0	1
1	Czech Republic (CZE)	1	0	0	1
3	Brazil (BRA)	0	1	0	1
3	Japan (JPN)	0	1	0	1
5	Finland (FIN)	0	0	1	1
5	United States (USA)	0	0	1	1
Totals (6 entries)		2	2	2	6

=== Medal events ===
Event	Gold	Silver	Bronze
Men	Czech Republic (CZE); Dalibor Vlk; Patrick Samoura; Matěj Burda; Vojtěch Sýkora; Nikolaos Noumeros; Tomáš Janša; František Fuxa; Luboš Kovář; Jan Zidek; Pavel Novák; Marek Vyroubal; Martin Svoboda	Brazil (BRA); Felipe Ruivo; Paulo Júnior; Lucas Siewert; Adyel Borges; Jonas Buffat; Caio Pacheco; Rafael Munford; João Pereira; Guilherme Abreu; Daniel Onwenu; Victor da Silva; Dikembe André	United States (USA); Sion James; Gregg Glenn; Mier Panoam; Spencer Elliot; Collin Holloway; Jordan Wood; Kolby King; Marvin Williams III; Asher Woods; Percy Daniels; Kevin Cross Jr. Jaylen Forbes
Women	China (CHN); Li Shuangfei; Zhang Jingyi; Li Yifan; Su Yuanyuan; Zhang Tao; Tang Ziting; Cao Boyi; Zhang Mao; Han Xu; Liu Yutong; Jia Saiqi; Song Kexin	Japan (JPN); Yua Emura; Maho Hayashi; Mona Tateyama; Azusa Asahina; Saori Yasue; Maika Miura; Ufuoma Tanaka; Minami Ikematsu; Maho Awatani; Sayaka Suzuoki; Miyu Okamoto; Nanami Morioka	Finland (FIN); Ebba Pekonen; Sara Bejedi; Veera Pirttinen; Elina Koskimies; Roosa Lehtoranta; Lotta Lahtinen; Lotta Vehka-Aho; Roosa Kosonen; Teresa Seppälä; Helmi Tulonen; Janette Aarnio; Saana Kujala
