= Kazakhstan at the 2026 Asian Games =

- IOC code: KAZ
- NOC: National Olympic Committee of the Republic of Kazakhstan

in Aichi–Nagoya, Japan September 19 – October 4, 2026
- Competitors: 559 in 42 sports
- Medals Ranked 8th: Gold 12 Silver 24 Bronze 48 Total 84

Asian Games appearances (overview)
- 1994; 1998; 2002; 2006; 2010; 2014; 2018; 2022; 2026

Kazakhstan is scheduled to compete at the 2026 Asian Games in Aichi Prefecture and Nagoya, Japan from September 19 to October 4, 2026.

== Competitors ==
The following is the list of the number of competitors participating at the Games per sport/discipline.

Sport	Men	Women	Total
Swimming	7	3	10
Diving	2	0	2
Artistic swimming	1	9	10
Water polo	15	15	30
Archery	6	6	12
Athletics	11	19	30
Badminton	4	5	9
Basketball	12	12	24
3x3 basketball	4	4	8
Boxing	6	5	11
Breaking	2	2	4
Canoe sprint	8	8	16
Canoe slalom	3	2	5
Ju-jitsu	10	5	15
Kurash	3	4	7
Mixed martial arts	3	1	4
Cycling – Track	9	1	10
Cycling – Road	3	3	6
Cycling – Mountain bike	2	2	4
Equestrian	1	3	4
Esports	24	1	25
Fencing	11	11	22
Golf	2	2	4
Artistic gymnastics	5	5	10
Rhythmic gymnastics	0	7	7
Trampoline gymnastics	2	1	3
Handball	16	15	31
Hockey	0	20	20
Judo	7	7	14
Karate	3	3	6
Modern pentathlon	4	3	7
Padel	4	4	8
Rowing	10	7	17
Rugby sevens	13	13	26
Sailing	3	3	6
Shooting	15	15	30
Skateboarding	2	1	3
Sport climbing	2	2	4
Table tennis	5	5	10
Taekwondo	5	3	8
Tennis	4	4	8
Triathlon	3	3	6
Volleyball	12	12	24
Beach volleyball	4	4	8
Weightlifting	5	5	10
Wrestling	12	6	18
Wushu	4	2	6
Total	288	271	559

== Medalists ==
The following Kazakhstan competitors won medals at the Games.

Medal	Name	Sport	Event	Date
Gold	Alexey Lutsenko	Cycling	Men's individual time trial	20 Sep
Gold	Rinata Sultanova	Cycling	Women's individual time trial	20 Sep
Gold	Rinata Sultanova	Cycling	Women's road race	September 20
Gold	Alexey Lutsenko	Cycling	Men's road event	September 20
Gold	Zholaman Bigabyl	Karate	Men's kumite	September 20
Gold	Sofya Berultseva	Karate	Women's kumite	September 20
Gold	Yerkingali Burkutalin	Mixed martial arts	Men's Traditional 77 kg	September 22
Gold	Kadyrbek Shynbayev	Mixed martial arts	Men's Modern 71 kg	September 22
Silver	TBD	TBD	TBD	September 21
Silver	Kristina Morozova	Athletics	Women's half marathon race walk	September 23
Silver	Milad Karimi	Gymnastics	Men's floor	September 24
Bronze	Sanzhar Adilov	Mixed martial arts	Men's traditional 65 kg	September 21
Bronze	Arlan Zhanabay	Triathlon	Men's individual	September 20

Medals by sport
Sport	1st place, gold medalist(s)	2nd place, silver medalist(s)	3rd place, bronze medalist(s)	Total
Cycling	2	0	0	2
Karate	2	0	0	2
Modern pentathlon	0	0	1	1
Triathlon	0	0	1	1

Medals by day
Day	Date	1st place, gold medalist(s)	2nd place, silver medalist(s)	3rd place, bronze medalist(s)	Total
1	20 Sep	4	0	2	6

== Archery ==
Kazakhstan entered 12 archers (six men and six women) for the 2026 Asian Games.

=== Recurve ===
Men

Athlete
Ilfat Abdullin
Dauletkeldy Zhangyrbay
Dastan Karimov

Women

Athlete
Alexandra Zemlyanova
Medina Murat
Samira Zhumagulova

=== Compound ===
Men

Athlete
Andrey Tyutyun
Akbarali Karabayev
Musa Dilmukhamet

Women

Athlete
Viktoriya Lyan
Adel Zheksenbinova
Roxana Yunusova

== Athletics ==
Kazakhstan entered 30 athletes (11 men and 19 women) for the 2026 Asian Games.

Men

Athlete	Event
Georgiy Sheiko	Marathon race walk
Shedrack Kimutai	Marathon
Ivan Ivanov	Shot put
Aleksey Khlystov	Javelin throw
David Yefremov	110 m hurdles
Maksim Frolovskiy	5000 m, 10,000 m
Andrey Sokolov	400 m, mixed 4 × 400 m relay
Mikhail Litvin	Mixed 4 × 400 m relay
Elnor Mukhitdinov	400 m, mixed 4 × 400 m relay
Vyacheslav Zems	400 m hurdles, mixed 4 × 400 m relay
Yefim Tarasov	Mixed 4 × 400 m relay

Women

Athlete	Event
Yasmina Toksanbayeva	Marathon race walk
Kristina Morozova	Half marathon race walk
Elmira Kalimullina	Half marathon race walk
Norah Jeruto	3000 m steeplechase, 5000 m
Daisy Jepkemei	5000 m, 10,000 m
Adelina Zems	400 m hurdles, 4 × 400 m relay, mixed 4 × 400 m relay
Mariya Shuvalova	400 m hurdles, 4 × 400 m relay, mixed 4 × 400 m relay
Aleksandra Zalyubovskaya	4 × 400 m relay, mixed 4 × 400 m relay
Ayana Bolatbekkyzy	800 m, 1500 m
Nadezhda Dubovitskaya	High jump
Kristina Ovchinnikova	High jump
Mariya Yefremova	Triple jump
Anastasiya Rypakova	Long jump
Polina Ivanova	Pole vault
Anna Cherkashina	Pole vault
Alina Chistyakova	Heptathlon
Sofya Kidenko	4 × 400 m relay, mixed 4 × 400 m relay
Anna Shumilo	4 × 400 m relay, mixed 4 × 400 m relay
Milana Zubareva	4 × 400 m relay, mixed 4 × 400 m relay

== Basketball ==
Summary

Team	Event	Group Stage				Quarterfinals	Semifinals	Final / BM	
Team	Event	Opposition Score	Opposition Score	Opposition Score	Rank	Opposition Score	Opposition Score	Opposition Score	Rank
Kazakhstan men's	Men's 5x5 tournament	China; L 61–99	Philippines; L 78–109	Bahrain; L 78–101	4	Did not advance			11
Kazakhstan women's	Women's 5x5 tournament	Philippines; L 58–86	Japan; L 23–88	Hong Kong; W 80–77	3	Did not advance			9

=== Men's 5x5 tournament ===
Team roster

- Abat Marat
- Shaim Kuanov
- Nikita Fedchenko
- Vladimir Ivanov
- Rustam Murzagaliyev
- Anton Bykov
- Konstantin Neff
- Roman Marchuk
- Daniil Severgin
- Bogdan Rabchenyuk
- Stanislav Sakhipov
- Askar Maydekin

Preliminary Rounds – Group B

Pos	Team	Pld	W	L	PF	PA	PD	Pts	Qualification
1	China	3	3	0	309	181	+128	6	Quarterfinals
2	Bahrain	3	2	1	249	268	−19	5	Quarterfinals
3	Philippines	3	1	2	255	272	−17	4	
4	Kazakhstan	3	0	3	217	309	−92	3	

Source: AsianGames2026.org

11 September 2026
10:00

Report
Box score

China	99–61	Kazakhstan
Scoring by quarter: 31–12, 27–19, 21–13, 20–17
Pts: Pang, Yu 17; Rebs: Li H. 9 Asts: Liao 9		Pts: Maydekin 11; Rebs: Ivanov 7 Asts: Murzagaliyev 4

Aichi International Arena, Nagoya
Referees: Wissam Zein (SYR), Abdullah Al-Hejaili (KSA), Ami Takano (JPN)

12 September 2026
19:00

Report
Box score

Kazakhstan	78–109	Philippines
Scoring by quarter: 15–18, 22–32, 29–32, 12–27
Pts: Bykov 15; Rebs: Bykov 10; Asts: Fedchenko, Rabchenyuk 5		Pts: Ahanmisi 22; Rebs: Bates, Lucero 9 Asts: Barefield 5

Aichi International Arena, Nagoya
Attendance: 8,026
Referees: Mohammad Taha (JOR), Chuang Chih-chun (TPE), Abdullah Al-Hejaili (KSA)

14 September 2026
10:00

Report
Box score

Bahrain	101–78	Kazakhstan
Scoring by quarter: 28–15, 27–24, 22–17, 24–22
Pts: Sampson 23; Rebs: Sampson 9 Asts: M. Rashed 8		Pts: Severgin 16; Rebs: Bykov 10; Asts: Neff 6

Aichi International Arena, Nagoya
Attendance: 6,360
Referees: Mohammad Tama (JOR), Shigeyuki Arisawa (JPN), Abdullah Al-Hejaili (KSA)

=== Women's 5x5 tournament ===
Team roster

- Alexandra Petelina
- Tamara Noiok
- Anastassiya Alishauskaite
- Oxana Nurbayeva
- Anna Bezgodova
- Kamila Amanzholova
- Nadezhda Yakovleva
- Daria Koroleva
- Adelya Mustafina
- Milana Krutevich
- Valeriya Kapitonova
- Darya Tsukanova

Preliminary Rounds – Group B

Pos	Team	Pld	W	L	PF	PA	PD	Pts	Qualification
1	Japan (H)	3	3	0	291	127	+164	6	Quarterfinals
2	Philippines	3	2	1	243	220	+23	5	Quarterfinals
3	Kazakhstan	3	1	2	161	251	−90	4	
4	Hong Kong	3	0	3	187	284	−97	3	

Source: aichi-nagoya2026.org
(H) Hosts

17 September 2026
16:00

Report
Results

Philippines	86–58	Kazakhstan
Scoring by quarter: 25–9, 24–23, 27–8, 10–18
Pts: Means 23; Rebs: Surada 5 Asts: Berberabe 8		Pts: Noiok 11; Rebs: Bezgodova 15; Asts: Koroleva 5

Aichi International Arena, Nagoya
Attendance: 1,549
Referees: Hu Jing (CHN), Budi Marfan (INA), Chuang Chih-Chun (TPE)

20 September 2026
13:50

Report
Results

Kazakhstan	23–88	Japan
Scoring by quarter: 9–23, 6–25, 5–23, 3–17
Pts: Amanzholova 6 Rebs: Bezgodova 6 Asts: Amanzholova 2		Pts: Owaki 16; Rebs: Okamoto, Tateyama 4 Asts: Akagi, Tsuneta 6

Aichi International Arena, Nagoya
Attendance: 7,360
Referees: Wissam Zein (SYR), Chuang Chih-Chun (TPE), Hu Jing (CHN)

22 September 2026
10:00

Report
Results

Kazakhstan	80–77 (OT)	Hong Kong
Scoring by quarter: 12–10, 17–19, 11–14, 25–28, Overtime: 12–9
Pts: Alishauskaite 22; Rebs: Bezgodova 15; Asts: Bezgodova 6		Pts: Li 32; Rebs: Li 9 Asts: Tong, Tsui 6

Aichi International Arena, Nagoya
Attendance: 5,993
Referees: Abdullah Alhejaili (KSA), Mahsa Kargari (IRI), Budi Marfan (INA)

== Cycling ==
=== Road ===
Kazakhstan entered six cyclists (three men and three women) in the road cycling events.

Athlete	Event	Time	Rank
Alexey Lutsenko	Men's road race	4:13:11	1st place, gold medalist(s)
Alexey Lutsenko	Men's individual time trial	41:24.05	1st place, gold medalist(s)
Yevgeniy Fedorov	Men's road race	4:15:09	2nd place, silver medalist(s)
Nicolas Vinokurov	Men's road race	4:19:27	7
Rinata Sultanova	Women's road race	2:52:41	8
Rinata Sultanova	Women's individual time trial	36:23.72	1st place, gold medalist(s)
Violetta Kazakova	Women's road race	2:58:00	23
Yelizaveta Sklyarova	Women's road race	2:55:52	15

=== Track ===
Kazakhstan entered ten cyclists (nine men and one woman) in the track cycling events.

Sprint

Athlete	Event	Qualification		Round 1	Repechage 1	Round 2	Repechage 2	Quarterfinals	Semifinals	Finals / BM	
Athlete	Event	Time Speed (km/h)	Rank	Opposition Time Speed (km/h)	Opposition Time Speed (km/h)	Opposition Time Speed (km/h)	Opposition Time Speed (km/h)	Opposition Time Speed (km/h)	Opposition Time Speed (km/h)	Opposition Time Speed (km/h)	Rank
Daniyar Shayakhmetov	Men's sprint	10.082	17	Did not advance							17
Kirill Kurdidi	Men's sprint	9.807	7 Q	Choi T-h (KOR); L 10.220; 10.195	Laitonjam (IND); W 10.510; 10.669	Awang (MAS); L 10.984; 10.576	Choi T-h (KOR); Yung TH (HKG); W 10.321; 10.447	Ota (JPN); L, L	Did not advance		6
Andrey Chugay; Daniyar Shayakhmetov; Dmitriy Rezanov; Kirill Kurdidi	Men's team sprint	44.328	3 Q	—N/a					Malaysia; L 44.221; 44.210	Did not advance	

Keirin

Athlete	Event	Round 1	Repechage	Semifinals	Final
Athlete	Event	Rank	Rank	Rank	Rank
Andrey Chugay	Men's keirin				
Kirill Kurdidi	Men's keirin				

Qualification legend: Q=Qualified for next round; R=Advanced to repechage

Pursuit

Athlete	Event	Qualification		Semifinals		Final	
Athlete	Event	Time	Rank	Opponent Time	Rank	Opponent Time	Rank
Alisher Zhumakan; Dmitriy Noskov; Ilya Karabutov; Maxim Khoroshavin; Ramis Dinmukhametov	Men's team pursuit	3:54.001	3 Q	China; L 3:51.589; 3:49.845	3 FB	South Korea; L 3:58.718; 3:55.933	4

Qualification legend: Q – Qualify to semifinal for gold medal; q – Qualify to classification semifinal; FA – Gold medal final; FB – Bronze medal final

Omnium

Athlete	Event	Scratch race		Tempo race		Elimination race		Points race		Total	
Athlete	Event	Points	Rank	Points	Rank	Points	Rank	Points	Rank	Points	Rank
Alisher Zhumakan	Men's omnium	26	8	40	1	16	13	56	3	138	4
Rinata Sultanova	Women's omnium	40	1								

Madison

Athlete	Event	Points	Laps	Rank
Ilya Karabutov; Maxim Khoroshavin; Ramis Dinmukhametov	Men's madison			

=== Mountain biking ===
Kazakhstan entered four cyclists (two men and two women) in the mountain biking events.

Athlete	Event	Time	Rank
Denis Sergiyenko	Men's cross-country	1:26:25	5
Yevgeniy Fedorov	Men's cross-country	-4 LAP	13
Tatyana Geneleva	Women's cross-country	-1 LAP	8
Yuliya Li	Women's cross-country	-4 LAP	14

== Equestrian ==
Kazakhstan entered four equestrians in the show jumping competition at the Games.

Show jumping

Athlete	Event
Oleg Sokolenko	Show jumping
Raisa Sokolenko	Show jumping
Nurila Turysbekova	Show jumping
Kseniya Batalova	Show jumping

== Field hockey ==
Summary

Key:

- s.o. – Match decided by penalty-shootout.

Team	Event	Group Stage						Semi-final	Pl	
Team	Event	Opposition Result	Opposition Result	Opposition Result	Opposition Result	Opposition Result	Rank	Opposition Result	Opposition Result	Rank
Women's team	Women's	Malaysia; L 0–5	South Korea; L 0–7	Chinese Taipei; L 1–4	Bangladesh; D 3–3	China; L 0–16	6	Did not advance	Uzbekistan; D 1–1 (4–2 s.o.)	11

=== Women's tournament ===
Team squads

The following is the Kazakhstan roster in the women's field hockey tournament of the 2026 Asian Games.

Head coach: (Kazakhstan) Serik Kalimbayev

1. Guzal Bakhavaddin (C,GK)
2. Viktoriya Shaimardanova
3. Dilnaz Khairusheva
4. Albina Dymchan
5. Natalya Sazontova
7. Viktoriya Lyapina
9. Uilbolsyn Zhetkergenova
10. Vera Domasheva
11. Ismira Apsatarova
12. Karlygash Bolganbayeva
14. Munira Temirgaliyeva
15. Natalya Gataulina
16. Dilnaz Olzhabayeva (GK)
17. Zhanel Izbassar
18. Viktoriya Lobanova
19. Assel Omirkhankyzy
20. Azkhan Yersultan
22. Gulsina Izbassarova
24. Eteliya Mailyan
29. Elvira Lutsenko

Preliminary round

Pos	Team	Pld	W	D	L	GF	GA	GD	Pts	Qualification
1	China	5	5	0	0	46	0	+46	15	Semi-finals
2	South Korea	5	4	0	1	20	5	+15	12	Semi-finals
3	Malaysia	5	3	0	2	14	7	+7	9	Fifth place classification
4	Chinese Taipei	5	2	0	3	8	21	−13	6	Fifth place classification
5	Bangladesh	5	0	1	4	6	30	−24	1	Ninth place game
6	Kazakhstan	5	0	1	4	4	35	−31	1	Eleventh place game

Source: FIH
Rules for classification: 1) points; 2) matches won; 3) goal difference; 4) goals for; 5) head-to-head result; 6) field goals for.

18 September 2026
19:00

Malaysia	5–0	Kazakhstan
Zulkifli 9', 21'; Mohd 12'; Azhar 17', 49'	Report

Gifu Prefectural Green Stadium
Umpires:
Liu Xiaoying (CHN)
Rama Potnis (IND)

21 September 2026
09:00

South Korea	7–0	Kazakhstan
Park Mi. 1'; An 28'; Kim J. 29'; L. Yu-ri 31'; Choi 39'; Park Seu. 39'; Jung 40'	Report

Gifu Prefectural Green Stadium
Umpires:
Rinky See (HKG)
Valerie Koh (SGP)

23 September 2026
13:00

Kazakhstan	1–4	Chinese Taipei
Lobanova 31'	Report	Huang 5', 60'; Fan 32'; Wang Y. 58'

Gifu Prefectural Green Stadium
Umpires:
Kelly Hudson (NZL)
Yu Tian (CHN)

25 September 2026
09:00

Kazakhstan	3–3	Bangladesh
Lobanova 21', 32', 37'	Report	Riya 2'; Akter 40'; Pal 47'

Gifu Prefectural Green Stadium
Umpires:
Shahiela Johari (MAS)
Kelly Hudson (NZL)

27 September 2026
09:00

China	16–0	Kazakhstan
Yu 8', 28', 29'; Chen Ya. 16'; Zhang 23', 24', 24'; Zhong 23', 27'; Dan 44', 49'; Chen Yi 51', 59'; Li H. 56'; Zou 57'; Fan 58'	Report

Gifu Prefectural Green Stadium
Umpires:
Emi Yamada (JPN)
Binish Hayat (PAK)

Eleventh place match

30 September 2026
09:00

Kazakhstan	1–1	Uzbekistan
Lobanova 9'	Report; SO Report	Demina 33'
Penalties
Gataulina (penalty shoot-out scored); Gataulina (penalty shoot-out scored); Lobanova (penalty shoot-out scored); Domashneva (penalty shoot-out scored)	4–2	(penalty shoot-out scored) Demina; (penalty shoot-out scored) Khaytboeva; (penalty shoot-out missed) Semyonova; (penalty shoot-out missed) Zaripova

Gifu Prefectural Green Stadium
Umpires:
Rinky See (HKG)
Shahiela Johari (MAS)

== Gymnastics ==
Kazakhstan entered 20 gymnasts for the 2026 Asian Games across artistic gymnastics, rhythmic gymnastics and trampoline.

=== Artistic gymnastics ===
Men

Athlete
Nariman Kurbanov
Milad Karimi
Ilyas Azizov
Nurtan Idrisov
Dmitriy Patanin

Women

Athlete
Darya Yasinskaya
Amina Khalimarden
Ameli Mukusheva
Radmilla Tarasova
Evelina Yezhova

=== Rhythmic gymnastics ===
Individual

Athlete
Akmaral Yerekesheva
Aibota Yertaikyzy

Group

Athlete
Kristina Chepulskaya
Jasmine Junusbayeva
Aida Khakimzhanova
Madina Myrzabay
Aizere Nurmagambetova

=== Trampoline ===
Men

Athlete
Roman Barkov
Yerlan Tasmagambetov

Women

Athlete
Viktoriya Butolina

== Handball ==
Summary

Team	Event	Group stage							Quarterfinal	Semifinal	Final / BM	
Team	Event	Opposition Score	Opposition Score	Opposition Score	Opposition Score	Opposition Score	Opposition Score	Rank	Opposition Score	Opposition Score	Opposition Score	Rank
Kazakhstan men's	Men's tournament	Bahrain	Kuwait	Iran	South Korea	—N/a						
Kazakhstan women's	Women's tournament	China; L 24–34	South Korea; L 18–42	Vietnam	Hong Kong	Japan	Uzbekistan	—N/a				

=== Men's tournament ===
Team rosters

- Assylkhan Nabiyev (1)
- Daulet Muratov (3)
- Ravil Osmanov (7)
- Mikhail Salmov (8)
- Aksan Oxikbayev (10)
- Odilzhan Gaziyev (13)
- Adam Makhmudov (16)
- Dauren Tilekkabyl (17)
- Asset Kali (20)
- Rustam Andrussyak (23)
- Nikita Yakubovich (71)
- Daniil Yakubovich (77)
- Ilya Pobochenko (79)
- Daviatbek Nadyrbekov (88)
- Azizzhan Rakimzhanov (98)
- Daniyar Irismetov (99)

Group play

Pos	Team	Pld	W	D	L	GF	GA	GD	Pts	Qualification
1	Bahrain	4	4	0	0	135	86	+49	8	Quarterfinals
2	South Korea	4	2	1	1	117	101	+16	5	Quarterfinals
3	Kuwait	4	2	0	2	117	97	+20	4	Quarterfinals
4	Iran	4	1	1	2	98	109	−11	3	Quarterfinals
5	Kazakhstan	4	0	0	4	84	158	−74	0	

Source: asiangames2026.org

20 September 2026; 12:30	Kazakhstan	20–43	Bahrain	Toyoda Gosei Memorial Gymnasium; Referees: Kawai, Usui (JPN)
20 September 2026; 12:30	Andrussyak, Oxikbayev 4	(8–20)	Al-Showaikh 9	Toyoda Gosei Memorial Gymnasium; Referees: Kawai, Usui (JPN)
20 September 2026; 12:30	5× (suspension)	Report	1× (suspension)	Toyoda Gosei Memorial Gymnasium; Referees: Kawai, Usui (JPN)

22 September 2026; 15:00	Kuwait	43–19	Kazakhstan	Toyoda Gosei Memorial Gymnasium; Referees: Abo, Al-Rashed (JOR)
22 September 2026; 15:00	Al-Mutawa 10	(20–12)	Salmov, D. Yakubovich 4	Toyoda Gosei Memorial Gymnasium; Referees: Abo, Al-Rashed (JOR)
22 September 2026; 15:00	2× (suspension)	Report	3× (suspension)	Toyoda Gosei Memorial Gymnasium; Referees: Abo, Al-Rashed (JOR)

23 September 2026; 12:30	Kazakhstan	23–28	Iran	Toyoda Gosei Memorial Gymnasium; Referees: Furukawa, Murata (JPN)
23 September 2026; 12:30	Oxikbayev 6	(13–16)	Ghalandari 5	Toyoda Gosei Memorial Gymnasium; Referees: Furukawa, Murata (JPN)
23 September 2026; 12:30	3× (suspension)	Report	1× (yellow card) 3× (suspension)	Toyoda Gosei Memorial Gymnasium; Referees: Furukawa, Murata (JPN)

25 September 2026; 17:30	Kazakhstan	22–44	South Korea	Kasugai City Gymnasium; Referees: Furukawa, Murata (JPN)
25 September 2026; 17:30	Oxikbayev, Tilekkabyl 5	(10–23)	Kim Y. 7	Kasugai City Gymnasium; Referees: Furukawa, Murata (JPN)
25 September 2026; 17:30	3× (suspension) 1× (red card)	Report	2× (suspension)	Kasugai City Gymnasium; Referees: Furukawa, Murata (JPN)

=== Women's tournament ===
Team rosters

- Damira Zhaparova (1)
- Mariya Sitnikova (3)
- Sevara Rejemetova (4)
- Aiym Tursyn (5)
- Aida Zhaparova (7)
- Veronika Khardina (9)
- Kristina Radayeva (10)
- Ziata Zvyagina (11)
- Zhannat Aitenova (12)
- Arailym Abdikhamit (14)
- Irina Khassakhanova (15)
- Zhanerke Seitkassym (17)
- Madina Myrzamseiitova (22)
- Kristina Stepanova (55)
- Zhanerke Kuandykova (72)

Group play

Pos	Team	Pld	W	D	L	GF	GA	GD	Pts
1st place, gold medalist(s)	South Korea	6	6	0	0	243	105	+138	12
2nd place, silver medalist(s)	Japan (H)	6	5	0	1	217	120	+97	10
3rd place, bronze medalist(s)	China	6	4	0	2	189	154	+35	8
4	Kazakhstan	6	3	0	3	164	187	−23	6
5	Uzbekistan	6	2	0	4	116	206	−90	4
6	Hong Kong	6	1	0	5	131	209	−78	2
7	Vietnam	6	0	0	6	128	207	−79	0

Source: asiangames2026.org
(H) Hosts

19 September 2026; 10:00	Kazakhstan	24–34	China	Kasugai City Gymnasium; Referees: Lee, Lee (KOR)
19 September 2026; 10:00	Khassakhanova 9	(12–17)	Liu C. 4	Kasugai City Gymnasium; Referees: Lee, Lee (KOR)
19 September 2026; 10:00	2× (suspension)	Report	1× (yellow card) 2× (suspension)	Kasugai City Gymnasium; Referees: Lee, Lee (KOR)

20 September 2026; 13:30	South Korea	42–18	Kazakhstan	Kasugai City Gymnasium; Referees: Al-Enezi, Al-Naseem (KUW)
20 September 2026; 13:30	Woo 10	(18–8)	Khassakhanova 7	Kasugai City Gymnasium; Referees: Al-Enezi, Al-Naseem (KUW)
20 September 2026; 13:30	1× (suspension)	Report	2× (suspension) 2× (red card)	Kasugai City Gymnasium; Referees: Al-Enezi, Al-Naseem (KUW)

22 September 2026; 13:30	Vietnam	25–29	Kazakhstan	Kasugai City Gymnasium; Referees: Lee, Lee (KOR)
22 September 2026; 13:30	Nguyễn T.A. 8	(14–14)	Seitkassym, Zhaparova 6	Kasugai City Gymnasium; Referees: Lee, Lee (KOR)
22 September 2026; 13:30	4× (suspension)	Report	1× (suspension)	Kasugai City Gymnasium; Referees: Lee, Lee (KOR)

23 September 2026; 13:30	Hong Kong	27–34	Kazakhstan	Kasugai City Gymnasium; Referees: Usui, Kawai (JPN)
23 September 2026; 13:30	Wong 6	(13–21)	Khassakhanova 8	Kasugai City Gymnasium; Referees: Usui, Kawai (JPN)
23 September 2026; 13:30	1× (suspension)	Report	2× (suspension)	Kasugai City Gymnasium; Referees: Usui, Kawai (JPN)

25 September 2026; 15:00	Kazakhstan	24–39	Japan	Toyoda Gosei Memorial Gymnasium; Referees: Mozafari, Mazaheri (IRI)
25 September 2026; 15:00	Abdikhamit 5	(12–15)	Aizawa 7	Toyoda Gosei Memorial Gymnasium; Referees: Mozafari, Mazaheri (IRI)
25 September 2026; 15:00	2× (suspension)	Report	2× (suspension)	Toyoda Gosei Memorial Gymnasium; Referees: Mozafari, Mazaheri (IRI)

26 September 2026; 12:30	Kazakhstan	35–20	Uzbekistan	Toyoda Gosei Memorial Gymnasium; Referees: Lee, Lee (KOR)
26 September 2026; 12:30	three players 6	(15–9)	Ruzieva 5	Toyoda Gosei Memorial Gymnasium; Referees: Lee, Lee (KOR)
26 September 2026; 12:30	4× (suspension)	Report	3× (suspension)	Toyoda Gosei Memorial Gymnasium; Referees: Lee, Lee (KOR)

== Judo ==
Kazakhstan entered 14 judokas (7 men and 7 women) for the 2026 Asian Games.

Men

Weight category	Athlete
−60 kg	Yeldos Smetov
−66 kg	Gusman Kyrgyzbayev
−73 kg	Bakytzhan Abdurakhmanov
−81 kg	Almat Adilet
−90 kg	Aidar Arapov
−100 kg	Marat Baikamurov
+100 kg	Yerassyl Kazhybayev

Women

Weight category	Athlete
−48 kg	Abiba Abuzhakynova
−52 kg	Meruert Sarsenova
−57 kg	Dana Abdirova
−63 kg	Esmigul Kuyulova
−70 kg	Azhar Askhat
−78 kg	Yekaterina Tokareva
+78 kg	Aida Toishybekova

== Karate ==
Kazakhstan entered six karateka (three men and three women) for the 2026 Asian Games.

Men

Athlete	Event	Round of 16	Quarterfinals	Semifinals	Repechage	Final / BM	
Athlete	Event	Opposition Result	Opposition Result	Opposition Result	Opposition Result	Opposition Result	Rank
Zholaman Bigabyl	–55 kg	—N/a	Muminov (TJK); W 7–0	Januar (INA); W 6–1	—N/a	Khalimov (UZB); W 9–1	1st place, gold medalist(s)
Olzhas Altynbek	–67 kg	Chrun (CAM); W 3–2	Al-Masatfa (JOR); L 7–8	Did not advance			
Nurkanat Azhikanov	–75 kg	Bye	Nemati (IRI); L 0–8	Did not advance	—N/a	Batican (PHI); W 10–1	3rd place, bronze medalist(s)

Women

Athlete	Event	Round of 16	Quarterfinals	Semifinals	Repechage	Final / BM	
Athlete	Event	Opposition Result	Opposition Result	Opposition Result	Opposition Result	Opposition Result	Rank
Bella Samasheva	–55 kg	Bye	Ku T-p (TPE); W 2–0	Robert (MAS); L 4–5	—N/a	Rakhimova (UZB); W 0–0	3rd place, bronze medalist(s)
Assel Kanay	–61 kg	Antora (BAN); W 9–1	Pürevjav (MGL); W 9–1	Vann (CAM); W 3–0	—N/a	Gong L (CHN); L 2–8	2nd place, silver medalist(s)
Sofya Berultseva	+68 kg	—N/a	Mostafa (KSA); W 9–6	Gurung (NEP); W 2–1	—N/a	Butsuwan (THA); W 8–0	1st place, gold medalist(s)

== Modern pentathlon ==
Kazakhstan entered seven pentathletes to compete at the Games.

Individual

Athlete	Event	Fencing ranking round (épée one touch)		Semi-finals													Final												
Athlete	Event	Fencing ranking round (épée one touch)		Fencing		Obstacles			Swimming (100 m freestyle)			Laser-run (10 m laser pistol / 3000 m cross-country)			Total points	Final rank	Fencing		Obstacles			Swimming			Laser-run			Total points	Final rank
Athlete	Event	V–D	Rank	Rank	MP points	Time	Rank	MP points	Time	Rank	MP points	Time	Rank	MP points	Total points	Final rank	Rank	MP points	Time	Rank	MP points	Time	Rank	MP points	Time	Rank	MP points	Total points	Final rank
Temirlan Abdraimov	Men	27–8	2	1	250	0:27.28	10	364	1:01.18	13	295	11:42.24	10	598	1507	6 Q	1	250	00:26.65	12	366	01:01.57	16	293	10:45.61	6	655	1564	7
Lev Chuvashov	Men	20–15	13	10	216	0:23.20	4	376	0:56.72	7	317	11:29.37	5	611	1520	5 Q	13	210	00:22.91	7	377	00:57.09	11	315	11:13.21	13	627	1529	13
Kirill Stadnik	Men	20–15	16	7	226	0:24.12	5	373	0:56.74	8	317	12:10.78	8	570	1486	8 Q	15	206	EL		0	00:57.39	12	314	11:22.35	14	618	1138	18
Tikhon Varyokhin	Men	20–15	14	4	236	0:22.91	4	377	0:58.28	11	309	11:42.09	9	598	1520	4 Q	8	224	00:22.29	4	379	00:57.40	13	313	11:02.61	9	638	1554	9
Diana Chshedrova	Women	19–13	12	1	250	0:38.73	7	329	1:03.19	4	285	13:28.45	10	492	1356	5 Q	8	224	0:42.07	16	319	1:02.95	11	286	14:48.21	18	412	241	18
Ayana Kazbekova	Women	17–15	16	10	216	0:35.50	5	339	1:06.40	9	268	12:40.41	1	540	1363	5 Q	17	198	0:38.31	13	331	1:05.93	16	271	12:51.37	13	529	1329	17
Yuliana Petrova	Women	14–18	22	8	224	0:38.22	7	331	1:03.13	4	285	13:15.24	8	505	1345	9 Q	16	204	0:35.33	12	339	1:03.05	12	285	12:59.77	15	521	1349	14

Team

Athlete	Event	Fencing	Obstacle	Swimming	Laser Run	Total	Rank
Temirlan Abdraimov; Tikhon Varyokhin; Lev Chuvashov	Men	684	1122	921	1910	4647	3rd place, bronze medalist(s)
Yuliana Petrova; Ayana Kazbekova; Diana Chshedrova	Women	626	989	842	1462	3919	4

== Shooting ==
Kazakhstan entered 16 sport shooters for the 2026 Asian Games.

=== Men ===
Individual

Athlete	Event	Qualification		Final	
Athlete	Event	Points	Rank	Points	Rank
Eldar Imankulov	10 m air pistol	554-7x	57	Did not advance	
Kirill Fedkin	10 m air pistol	569-15x	33	Did not advance	
Valeriy Rakhimzhan	10 m air pistol	582-25x	4 Q	177.6	5
Artemiy Kabakov	25 m rapid fire pistol	563-5x	23	Did not advance	
Kirill Tsukanov	25 m rapid fire pistol	570-15x	14	Did not advance	
Nikita Chiryukin	25 m rapid fire pistol	578-20x	5 Q	7	8
Islam Satpayev	10 m air rifle	624.1	24	Did not advance	
Islam Satpayev	50 m rifle 3 position	584-34x	10 Q	348.3	3rd place, bronze medalist(s)
Konstantin Malinovskiy	10 m air rifle	623.9	26	Did not advance	
Konstantin Malinovskiy	50 m rifle 3 position	583-27x	13	Did not advance	
Nikita Shakhtorin	10 m air rifle	623.4	29	Did not advance	
Nikita Shakhtorin	50 m rifle 3 position	579-18x	20	Did not advance	
Alisher Aisalbayev	Trap	117	7 Q	7	7
Daniil Pochivalov	Trap	116	12	Did not advance	
Mark Pochivalov	Trap	115	15	Did not advance	
Alexander Mukhamediyev	Skeet	119	6 Q	19	6
Artyom Sedelnikov	Skeet	112	28	Did not advance	
David Pochivalov	Skeet	115	17	Did not advance	

Team

Athlete	Event	Final	
Athlete	Event	Points	Rank
Eldar Imankulov; Kirill Fedkin; Valeriy Rakhimzhan	10 m air pistol	1705-47x	10
Artemiy Kabakov; Kirill Tsukanov; Nikita Chiryukin	25 m rapid fire pistol	1711-40x	4
Islam Satpayev; Konstantin Malinovskiy; Nikita Shakhtorin	10 m air rifle	1871.4	7
Islam Satpayev; Konstantin Malinovskiy; Nikita Shakhtorin	50 m rifle 3 position	1746-79x	5
Alisher Aisalbayev; Daniil Pochivalov; Mark Pochivalov	Trap	348	3rd place, bronze medalist(s)
Alexander Mukhamediyev; Artyom Sedelnikov; David Pochivalov	Skeet	346	4

=== Women ===
Individual

Athlete	Event	Qualification		Final	
Athlete	Event	Points	Rank	Points	Rank
Nina Starova	10 m air pistol	557-8x	43	Did not advance	
Nina Starova	25 m pistol	566-11x	37	Did not advance	
Saule Alimbek	10 m air pistol	549-9x	48	Did not advance	
Saule Alimbek	25 m pistol	562-9x	40	Did not advance	
Valeriya Popelova	10 m air pistol	575-19x	8 Q	139.8	7
Valeriya Popelova	25 m pistol	575-13x	18	Did not advance	
Alexandra Le	10 m air rifle	628.5	15	Did not advance	
Sofiya Shulzhenko	10 m air rifle	624.6	28	Did not advance	
Sofiya Shulzhenko	50 m rifle 3 position	585-31x	14	Did not advance	
Yelizaveta Bezrukova	10 m air rifle	626.8	22	Did not advance	
Yelizaveta Bezrukova	50 m rifle 3 position	582-26x	22	Did not advance	
Arina Malinovskaya	50 m rifle 3 position	587-32x	9 Q	316.7	6
Eleonora Ibragimova	Trap	110	9 Q	6	8
Milana Papchikhina	Trap	104	21	Did not advance	
Nargiza Sarmanova	Trap	105	19	Did not advance	
Adel Sadakbayeva	Skeet	106	17	Did not advance	
Assem Orynbay	Skeet	117	4 Q	28	3rd place, bronze medalist(s)
Zoya Piskun	Skeet	113	6 Q	18	6

Team

Athlete	Event	Final	
Athlete	Event	Points	Rank
Nina Starova; Saule Alimbek; Valeriya Popelova	10 m air pistol	1681-36x	10
Nina Starova; Saule Alimbek; Valeriya Popelova	25 m pistol	1703-33x	9
Alexandra Le; Sofiya Shulzhenko; Yelizaveta Bezrukova	10 m air rifle	1879.9	6
Arina Malinovskaya; Sofiya Shulzhenko; Yelizaveta Bezrukova	50 m rifle 3 position	1754-89x	3rd place, bronze medalist(s)
Eleonora Ibragimova; Milana Papchikhina; Nargiza Sarmanova	Trap	319	6
Adel Sadakbayeva; Assem Orynbay; Zoya Piskun	Skeet	336	2nd place, silver medalist(s)

=== Mixed ===
Team

Athlete	Event	Qualification		Final	
Athlete	Event	Points	Rank	Points	Rank
Valeriy Rakhimzhan; Valeriya Popelova	10 m air pistol	569-16x	16	Did not advance	
Alexandra Le; Islam Satpayev	10 m air rifle	629.1	5	Did not advance	
Aizhan Dosmagambetova; Mark Pochivalov	Trap	134	6	Did not advance	
Alexandr Mukhamediyev; Assem Orynbay	Skeet	134	6	Did not advance	

== Table tennis ==
Men

Athlete	Event	Round of 32	Round of 16	Quarterfinal	Semifinal	Final / BM	
Athlete	Event	Opposition Result	Opposition Result	Opposition Result	Opposition Result	Opposition Result	Rank
Alan Kurmangaliyev	Singles	Gubran (YEM); W 4–0	Harimoto (JPN); L 0–4	Did not advance			
Kirill Gerassimenko	Singles	Tancharoen (THA); W 4–3	Lin Y-j (TPE); L 0–4	Did not advance			
Aidos Kenzhigulov; Sanzhar Zhubanov	Doubles	Alamian / Alamiyan (IRI); L 2–3	Did not advance				
Alan Kurmangaliyev; Kirill Gerassimenko	Doubles	Faraji / Ghaffari (IRI); W 3–1	Feng / Kuo (TPE); L 0–3	Did not advance			

Women

Athlete	Event	Round of 64	Round of 32	Round of 16	Quarterfinal	Semifinal	Final / BM	
Athlete	Event	Opposition Result	Opposition Result	Opposition Result	Opposition Result	Opposition Result	Opposition Result	Rank
Sarvinoz Mirkadirova	Singles	Pyon S-g (PRK); L 1–4	Did not advance					
Zauresh Akasheva	Singles	Bye	Kamalova (UZB); W 4–0	Shin Y-b (KOR); L 0–4	Did not advance			
Albina Zhaxylykova; Angelina Romanovskaya	Doubles	Bye	Kuai M / Wang MY (CHN); L 0–3	Did not advance				
Sarvinoz Mirkadirova; Zauresh Akasheva	Doubles	Bye	Putri / Rasmi (INA); L 2–3	Did not advance				

Mixed

Athlete	Event	Round of 64	Round of 32	Round of 16	Quarterfinal	Semifinal	Final / BM	
Athlete	Event	Opposition Result	Opposition Result	Opposition Result	Opposition Result	Opposition Result	Opposition Result	Rank
Iskender Kharki; Sarvinoz Mirkadirova	Doubles	Bye	Zheng HW / Leong ON (MAC); W 3–2	Lim J-h / Shin Y-b (KOR); L 0–3	Did not advance			
Kirill Gerassimenko; Zauresh Akasheva	Doubles	Feng Y-h / Yeh Y-t (TPE); L 1–3	Did not advance					

Team

Athlete	Event	Group stage				Round of 16	Quarterfinal	Semifinal	Final	
Athlete	Event	Opposition Score	Opposition Score	Opposition Score	Rank	Opposition Score	Opposition Score	Opposition Score	Opposition Score	Rank
Aidos Kenzhigulov; Alan Kurmangaliyev; Iskender Kharki; Kirill Gerassimenko; Sanzhar Zhubanov	Men's	Bangladesh; W 3–0	Singapore; W 3–1	Laos; W 3–1	1 Q	Bahrain; W 3–0	Japan; L 0–3	Did not advance		
Albina Zhaxylykova; Angelina Romanovskaya; Sarvinoz Mirkadirova; Zauresh Akasheva; Zhanerke Koshkumbayeva	Women's	South Korea; L 0–3	Maldives; W 3–1	—N/a	2 Q	Uzbekistan; L 2–3	Did not advance			

== Triathlon ==
Individual

Athlete	Event	Time						Rank
Athlete	Event	Swim (0.75 km)	Trans 1	Bike (20 km)	Trans 2	Run (5 km)	Total	Rank
Arlan Zhanabay	Men	9:03	0:33	28:15	0:19	15:01	53:11	3rd place, bronze medalist(s)
Ayan Beisenbayev	Men	9:08	0:36	28:50	0:18	16:04	54:56	9
Diana Yerzhanova	Women	10:46	0:43	33:39	0:20	18:45	1:04:13	17

Relay

Athlete	Event	Time						Rank
Athlete	Event	Swim (300 m)	Trans 1	Bike (6.6 km)	Trans 2	Run (1 km)	Total	Rank
Diana Yerzhanova	Mixed	4:21	0:43	10:28	0:27	7:53	23:52	—N/a
Yegor Krupyakov	Mixed	3:58	0:41	9:59	0:24	6:36	21:38	—N/a
Aida Kim	Mixed	4:47	0:51	11:23	0:28	7:40	25:09	—N/a
Ayan Beisenbayev	Mixed	4:06	0:44	9:55	0:22	5:59	21:06	—N/a
Total	Mixed	—N/a					1:26:45	7

== Volleyball ==
Kazakhstan qualified both its men's and women's national volleyball teams for the 2026 Asian Games.

=== Beach ===
Athletes	Event	Preliminary round				Round of 16	Quarterfinal	Semifinal	Final / BM	
Athletes	Event	Opposition Score	Opposition Score	Opposition Score	Rank	Opposition Score	Opposition Score	Opposition Score	Opposition Score	Rank
Abdulmajid Mokhammad; Dmitriy Yakovlev	Men's	Junsuke / Ishijima (JPN); L 1–2 (20–22, 21–19, 12–15)	Dauilbaev / Tolibaev (UZB); L 0–2 (21–14, 16–21, 12–15)	Song JY / Wang YW (CHN); L INJ	4	Did not advance				
Sergey Bogatu; Kirill Gurin	Men's	Faisal / Bayhaqly (INA); W 2–1 (22–24, 21–19, 15–12)	Bae I-h / Yeo M-s (KOR); W 2–0 (21–10, 21–10)	Lee CH / Lee LF (HKG); W 2–0 (21–15, 21–18)	1 Q	Khakizadeh / Ghalehnovi (IRI); W 2–1 (21–15, 18–21, 15–11)	Taovato / Tipjan (THA); L 0–2 (19–21, 13–21)	Did not advance		5
Kristina Karimova; Yekaterina Ryukhova	Women's	Bahmanzadeh / Ashraf Abuissa (QAT); W 2–0 (21–7, 21–6)	Ito / Sawame (JPN); L 0–2 (12–21, 7–21)	—N/a	2 Q	Naraphornrapat / Kongphopsarutawadee (THA); L 0–2 (8–21, 7–21)	Did not advance			9
Laura Kabulbekova; Merey Kozhakhmet	Women's	M.L. Khatun / M.S. Khatun (BAN); W 2–0 (21–6, 21–2)	Pons / Rondina (PHI); W 2–1 (21–17, 10–21, 15–10)	—N/a	1 Q	To WT / To WM (HKG); W 2–0 (21–19, 21–19)	Xia / Yan (CHN); L 0–2 (12–21, 15–21)	Did not advance		5

=== Indoor ===
Summary

Team	Event	Group stage				Quarterfinal / 9th-14th classification	Semifinal / 5th-8th classification	Final / BM / 7th classification	
Team	Event	Opposition Score	Opposition Score	Opposition Score	Rank	Opposition Score	Opposition Score	Opposition Score	Rank
Kazakhstan men's	Men's tournament	Pakistan; L 1–3	Japan; L 0–3	Uzbekistan; W 3–1	3	Hong Kong; W 3–2	Chinese Taipei; W 1–3	11th place match Indonesia; W 3–1	11
Kazakhstan women's	Women's tournament	Philippines; W 3–1	China; L 0–3	—N/a	2 Q	South Korea; L 0–3	Chinese Taipei; L 2–3	Vietnam; L 0–3	8

==== Men's tournament ====
Team roster

- Anton Kuznetsov
- Murojon Khavazmatov
- Nurlibek Nurmakhambetov
- Ilya Tavolzhanskiy
- Nurlybek Maksat
- Vladislav Mastikhin
- Aibek Zhaxylykov
- Klim Ryukhov
- Vladislav Kunchenko
- Dinmukhammed Kabdulov
- Azamat Seilkhanov
- Assyikhan Izbergenuly

Group play

Pos	Team	Pld	W	L	Pts	SW	SL	SR	SPW	SPL	SPR	Qualification
1	Japan (H)	3	3	0	9	9	0	MAX	229	173	1.324	Quarterfinals
2	Pakistan	3	2	1	6	6	4	1.500	236	218	1.083	Quarterfinals
3	Kazakhstan	3	1	2	3	4	7	0.571	221	253	0.874	Classification 9th–16th
4	Uzbekistan	3	0	3	0	1	9	0.111	196	238	0.824	Classification 9th–16th

Source: asiangames2026.org
Rules for classification: Tiebreakers
(H) Host

==== Women's tournament ====
Team roster

- Perizat Nurbergenova
- Natalya Khazova
- Yuliya Fomenko
- Polina Ufimtseva
- Margarita Belchenko
- Kristina Belova
- Zhanna Syroyeshkina
- Madina Beket
- Tatyana Nikitina
- Aigul Mulkibayeva
- Tatyana Yatskiv
- Irina Kuznetsova

Group play

Pos	Team	Pld	W	L	Pts	SW	SL	SR	SPW	SPL	SPR	Qualification
1	China	2	2	0	6	6	0	MAX	150	86	1.744	Quarterfinals
2	Kazakhstan	2	1	1	3	3	4	0.750	141	170	0.829	Quarterfinals
3	Philippines	2	0	2	0	1	6	0.167	143	178	0.803	Classification 9th–14th

Source: asiangames2026.org
Rules for classification: Tiebreakers

== Wrestling ==
Kazakhstan entered 18 wrestlers (12 men and 6 women) for the 2026 Asian Games.

=== Men's freestyle ===
Weight category	Athlete
−57 kg	Nurdanat Aitanov
−65 kg	Nachyn Kuular
−74 kg	Nurkhoja Kaipanov
−86 kg	Azamat Dauletbekov
−97 kg	Rizabek Aitmukhan
−125 kg	Yedige Kassymbek

=== Men's Greco-Roman ===
Weight category	Athlete
−60 kg	Yernur Fidakhmetov
−67 kg	Meyirzhan Shermakhanbet
−77 kg	Demeu Zhadrayev
−87 kg	Shamil Ozhayev
−97 kg	Islam Yevloyev
−130 kg	Olzhas Syrlybay

=== Women's freestyle ===
Weight category	Athlete
−50 kg	Zeynep Bayanova
−53 kg	Shugyla Omirbek
−57 kg	Nilufar Raimova
−62 kg	Irina Kuznetsova
−68 kg	Zhamila Bakbergenova
−76 kg	Elmira Syzdykova

== Wushu ==
=== Sanda ===
Men

Athlete	Event	Round of 16	Quarter-finals	Semi-finals	Final	
Athlete	Event	Opposition Score	Opposition Score	Opposition Score	Opposition Score	Rank
Karim Iminzhanov	–60 kg	Hứa (VIE); L 0–2	Did not advance			
Bexultan Koskenov	–65 kg	Marbun (INA); L 0–2	Did not advance			
Alizhan Ablagatov	–70 kg	Bye	–	–	–	
Abdulrashid Abdullayev	–75 kg	Teunchaleun (LAO); W 2–0	–	–	–	

Women

Athlete	Event	Round of 16	Quarter-finals	Semi-finals	Final	
Athlete	Event	Opposition Score	Opposition Score	Opposition Score	Opposition Score	Rank
Ayan Tursyn	–52 kg	Akmuhammedowa (TKM); W 2–0	–	–	–	
Alina Shossova	–60 kg	Nguyễn (VIE); L 0–2	Did not advance			
