= Shooting at the 2022 Asian Games – Women's trap =

Women's trap at the 2022 Asian Games
- Venue: Fuyang Yinhu Sports Centre
- Dates: 30 September – 1 October 2023
- Competitors: 27 from 13 nations

Medalists
gold medal	Zhang Xinqiu	China
silver medal	Wu Cuicui	China
bronze medal	Mariya Dmitriyenko	Kazakhstan

The women's trap competition at the 2022 Asian Games in Hangzhou, China was held on 30 September and 1 October 2023 at Fuyang Yinhu Sports Centre.

== Schedule ==
All times are China Standard Time (UTC+08:00)

Date	Time	Event
Saturday, 30 September 2023	09:00	Qualification day 1
Sunday, 1 October 2023	09:00	Qualification day 2
Sunday, 1 October 2023	15:00	Final

== Records ==
Prior to this competition, the existing world, Asian and Games records were as follows.

Qualification
World Record	Zuzana Rehák-Štefečeková (SVK)	125	Tokyo, Japan	29 July 2021
Asian Record	Ray Bassil (LBN)	121	Al-Ain, United Arab Emirates	8 April 2019
Games Record	Mariya Dmitriyenko (KAZ); Ray Bassil (LBN)	119	Palembang, Indonesia	20 August 2018
Final
World Record	Ashley Carroll (USA)	48	Guadalajara, Mexico	5 March 2018
Asian Record	Deng Weiyun (CHN)	46	Changwon, South Korea	15 May 2019
Games Record	Zhang Xinqiu (CHN)	45	Palembang, Indonesia	20 August 2018

== Results ==
Legend

- DNS — Did not start

=== Qualification ===
Rank	Athlete	Day 1			Day 2		Total	S-off	Notes
Rank	Athlete	1	2	3	4	5	Total	S-off	Notes
1	Wu Cuicui (CHN)	25	25	25	25	24	124		AR
2	Zhang Xinqiu (CHN)	25	24	23	23	23	118		
3	Li Qingnian (CHN)	20	25	24	24	22	115		
4	Mariya Dmitriyenko (KAZ)	22	23	25	23	22	115		
5	Manisha Keer (IND)	24	23	19	25	23	114	+2	
6	Shahad Al-Hawal (KUW)	25	24	21	20	24	114	+1+1	
7	Aizhan Dosmagambetova (KAZ)	24	21	23	22	24	114	+1+0	
8	Cho Seon-ah (KOR)	20	25	22	24	22	113		
9	Preeti Rajak (IND)	24	22	23	20	23	112		
10	Lea Korban (LBN)	24	21	23	22	22	112		
11	Rajeshwari Kumari (IND)	23	22	20	22	24	111		
12	Lin Yi-chun (TPE)	19	22	24	23	22	110		
13	Lee Bo-na (KOR)	24	20	21	23	22	110		
14	Marwa Buarki (BRN)	24	23	20	20	21	108		
15	Anastassiya Prilepina (KAZ)	22	22	21	21	21	107		
16	Kang Gee-eun (KOR)	22	23	23	19	20	107		
17	Marzieh Parvareshnia (IRI)	17	21	22	22	23	105		
18	Adylia Safitri (INA)	20	21	22	19	22	104		
19	Liu Wan-yu (TPE)	21	20	21	19	22	103		
20	Hoàng Thị Tuất (VIE)	19	22	22	21	19	103		
21	Hajar Abdulmalik (KUW)	20	23	19	19	21	102		
22	Sarah Al-Hawal (KUW)	22	19	20	21	20	102		
23	Kholoud Al-Khalaf (QAT)	21	21	16	20	22	100		
24	Nguyễn Thị Tuyết Mai (VIE)	20	19	17	18	22	96		
25	Ayesha Al-Yassi (UAE)	17	18	19	19	19	92		
—	Metha Al-Binali (QAT)						DNS		
—	Ray Bassil (LBN)						DNS		

=== Final ===
Rank	Athlete	1st stage				2nd stage – Elimination						S-off	Notes
Rank	Athlete	1	2	3	4	1	2	3	4	5	6	S-off	Notes
1st place, gold medalist(s)	Zhang Xinqiu (CHN)	5	10	14	19	23	28	32	37	42	47		AR
2nd place, silver medalist(s)	Wu Cuicui (CHN)	4	9	14	17	22	26	30	34	39	43		
3rd place, bronze medalist(s)	Mariya Dmitriyenko (KAZ)	4	9	14	19	23	27	30	34				
4	Aizhan Dosmagambetova (KAZ)	4	8	12	14	19	23	27					
5	Shahad Al-Hawal (KUW)	3	7	11	15	19	21						
6	Manisha Keer (IND)	3	6	8	12	16							
