= Shooting at the 2026 Asian Games – Women's trap =

Women's trap at the 2026 Asian Games
- Venue: Aichi Pref. General Shooting Gallery
- Dates: 29 September 2026
- Competitors: 27 from 11 nations

Medalists
gold medal	Neeru Dhanda	India
silver medal	Sun Yunong	China
bronze medal	Hajar Abdulmalik	Kuwait

The women's trap competition at the 2026 Asian Games in Aichi Prefecture, Japan was held on 29 September 2026 at the Aichi Pref. General Shooting Gallery.

== Schedule ==
All times are Japan Standard Time (UTC+09:00)

Date	Time	Event
Tuesday, 29 September 2026	10:00	Qualification
Tuesday, 29 September 2026	14:00	Final

== Records ==
Prior to this competition, the existing world, Asian and Games records were as follows.

Qualification
World Record	Zuzana Rehák Štefečeková (SVK)	125	Tokyo, Japan	29 July 2021
Asian Record	Wu Cuicui (CHN)	124	Hangzhou, China	1 October 2023
Games Record	Wu Cuicui (CHN)	124	Hangzhou, China	1 October 2023
Final
World Record	Penny Smith (AUS)	30	Almaty, Kazakhstan	9 May 2026
Asian Record	Liu Wan-Yu (TPE)	24	Doha, Qatar	20 January 2026
Games Record	—	—	—	—

== Results ==
=== Qualification ===
Rank	Athlete	Rounds					Total	S-off	Notes
Rank	Athlete	1	2	3	4	5	Total	S-off	Notes
1	Neeru (IND)	24	24	24	23	23	118	+2	Q
2	Ray Bassil (QAT)	25	23	23	23	24	118	+1	Q
3	Zhu Jingyu (CHN)	23	22	25	23	24	117		Q
4	Sun Yunong (CHN)	21	24	23	25	23	116		Q
5	Lin Yi-Chun (TPE)	21	24	24	24	22	115	+2	Q
6	Liu Wan-Yu (TPE)	20	25	22	25	23	115	+1	Q
7	Liu Shanshan (CHN)	21	25	22	24	21	113		
8	Hajar Abdulmalik (KUW)	22	23	23	23	20	111		Q
9	Eleonora Ibragimova (KAZ)	20	22	22	23	23	110		Q
10	Riyo Kiyoshi (JPN)	22	20	22	23	22	109		
11	Sarah Alhawal (KUW)	21	21	24	23	20	109		
12	Lee Bo-na (KOR)	24	22	20	24	19	109		
13	Marziyeh Parvaresh Nia (IRI)	19	21	23	23	22	108		
14	Chattaya Kitcharoen (THA)	22	21	20	24	21	108		
15	Marwa Buarki (BRN)	20	22	23	20	22	107		
16	Aashima Ahlawat (IND)	20	22	23	19	22	106		
17	Chiemi Kojima (JPN)	21	18	22	21	23	105		
18	Nanami Miyasaka (JPN)	22	21	20	21	21	105		
19	Nargiza Sarmanova (KAZ)	21	22	20	22	20	105		
20	Shahad Alhawal (KUW)	22	21	20	22	20	105		
21	Milana Papchikhina (KAZ)	22	17	22	21	22	104		
22	Fany Febriana Wulandari (INA)	19	22	20	23	20	104		
23	Manisha Keer (IND)	19	21	22	22	20	104		
24	Maryam Fadhel Abdulla Mejren Sulaiti (BRN)	23	19	21	22	19	104		
25	Kholoud Hassan Al-Khalaf (QAT)	19	24	20	19	21	103		
26	Metha Hamad Albinali (QAT)	20	19	23	23	18	103		
27	Adylia Safitri (INA)	22	19	19	21	18	99		

=== Final ===
Rank	Athlete	1st stage		2nd stage – Elimination				S-off	Notes
Rank	Athlete	1	2	3	4	5	6	S-off	Notes
1st place, gold medalist(s)	Neeru Dhanda (IND)	5	4	5	5	4	28		AR
2nd place, silver medalist(s)	Sun Yunong (CHN)	5	5	4	3	4	26		
3rd place, bronze medalist(s)	Hajar Abdulmalik (KUW)	5	5	4	4	21			
4	Ray Bassil (QAT)	5	4	4	16				
5	Zhu Jingyu (CHN)	4	4	13					
6	Lin Yi-chun (TPE)	4	4	12					
7	Liu Wan-yu (TPE)	2	6						
8	Eleonora Ibragimova (KAZ)	3	6						
