= Shooting at the 2018 Asian Games – Mixed trap team =

Mixed trap team at the 2018 Asian Games
- Venue: Jakabaring Shooting Range
- Dates: 21 August 2018
- Competitors: 22 from 11 nations

Medalists
gold medal	Alain Moussa; Ray Bassil	Lebanon
silver medal	Yang Kun-pi; Lin Yi-chun	Chinese Taipei
bronze medal	Du Yu; Wang Xiaojing	China

The mixed trap team event at the 2018 Asian Games in Palembang, Indonesia took place on 21 August at the Jakabaring International Shooting Range.

== Schedule ==
All times are Western Indonesia Time (UTC+07:00)

Date	Time	Event
Tuesday, 21 August 2018	10:30	Qualification
Tuesday, 21 August 2018	16:00	Final

== Records ==
Prior to this competition, the existing world, Asian and Games records were as follows.

Qualification
World Record	Kuwait	145	Changwon, South Korea	25 April 2018
Asian Record	Kuwait	145	Changwon, South Korea	25 April 2018
Games Record	—	—	—	—
Final
World Record	Italy	47	Leobersdorf, Austria	5 August 2018
Asian Record	China	41	Guadalajara, Mexico	7 March 2018
Games Record	—	—	—	—

== Results ==
=== Qualification ===
Rank	Team	Round			Total	S-off	Notes
Rank	Team	1	2	3	Total	S-off	Notes
1	Chinese Taipei (TPE)	48	49	49	146	+3	WR
	Yang Kun-pi	24	25	25	74		
	Lin Yi-chun	24	24	24	72		
2	China (CHN)	50	48	48	146	+2	WR
	Du Yu	25	25	24	74		
	Wang Xiaojing	25	23	24	72		
3	Lebanon (LBN)	48	46	49	143	+11	
	Alain Moussa	25	24	25	74		
	Ray Bassil	23	22	24	69		
4	South Korea (KOR)	48	48	47	143	+10	
	Ahn Dae-myeong	24	24	24	72		
	Kang Gee-eun	24	24	23	71		
5	India (IND)	46	49	47	142		
	Lakshay Sheoran	23	24	25	72		
	Shreyasi Singh	23	25	22	70		
6	Kuwait (KUW)	47	46	45	138	+2	
	Khaled Al-Mudhaf	24	24	24	72		
	Sarah Al-Hawal	23	22	21	66		
7	Qatar (QAT)	43	47	48	138	+1	
	Mohammed Al-Rumaihi	23	24	24	71		
	Kholoud Al-Khalaf	20	23	24	67		
8	Kazakhstan (KAZ)	43	48	42	133		
	Andrey Mogilevskiy	22	23	20	65		
	Oxana Sereda	21	25	22	68		
9	Thailand (THA)	44	47	41	132		
	Savate Sresthaporn	24	24	22	70		
	Chattaya Kitcharoen	20	23	19	62		
10	Iran (IRI)	43	43	42	128		
	Mohammad Hossein Parvareshnia	23	24	22	69		
	Sepideh Sirani	20	19	20	59		
11	Indonesia (INA)	41	40	42	123		
	Slamet Riadi	23	18	21	62		
	Sylvia Silimang	18	22	21	61		

=== Final ===
Rank	Team	1st stage				2nd stage – Elimination						S-off	Notes
Rank	Team	1	2	3	4	1	2	3	4	5	6	S-off	Notes
1st place, gold medalist(s)	Lebanon (LBN); Alain Moussa; Ray Bassil	4	8	12	17	20	25	30	34	38	43		AR
2nd place, silver medalist(s)	Chinese Taipei (TPE); Yang Kun-pi; Lin Yi-chun	5	10	14	18	21	25	29	34	38	42		
3rd place, bronze medalist(s)	China (CHN); Du Yu; Wang Xiaojing	4	9	12	15	20	24	28	31				
4	Kuwait (KUW); Khaled Al-Mudhaf; Sarah Al-Hawal	2	7	12	15	19	24	26					
5	South Korea (KOR); Ahn Dae-myeong; Kang Gee-eun	4	7	10	15	19	22						
6	India (IND); Lakshay Sheoran; Shreyasi Singh	4	5	8	11	16							
