= Shooting at the 2026 Asian Games – Women's trap team =

Women's trap team at the 2026 Asian Games
- Venue: Aichi Pref. General Shooting Gallery
- Dates: 29 September 2026
- Competitors: 18 from 6 nations

Medalists
gold medal	China; Liu Shanshan, Sun Yunong, Zhu Jingyu
silver medal	India; Neeru Dhanda, Aashima Ahlawat, Manisha Keer
bronze medal	Kuwait; Hajar Abdulmalik, Shahad Alhawal, Sarah Alhawal

The women's trap team competition at the 2026 Asian Games in Aichi Prefecture, Japan was held on 29 September 2026 at the Aichi Pref. General Shooting Gallery.

== Schedule ==
All times are Japan Standard Time (UTC+09:00)

Date	Time	Event
Sunday, 27 September 2026	6:30	Final
Monday, 28 September 2026	6:30	Final
Tuesday, 29 September 2026	6:30	Final

== Records ==
Prior to this competition, the existing world, Asian and Games records were as follows.

World Record	China	357	Hangzhou, China	1 October 2023
Asian Record	China	357	Hangzhou, China	1 October 2023
Games Record	China	357	Hangzhou, China	1 October 2023

== Results ==
Rank	Team	Rounds					Total	Notes
Rank	Team	1	2	3	4	5	Total	Notes
1st place, gold medalist(s)	China (CHN)	65	71	70	72	68	346	
	Liu Shanshan	21	25	22	24	21	113	
	Sun Yunong	21	24	23	25	23	116	
	Zhu Jingyu	23	22	25	23	24	117	
2nd place, silver medalist(s)	India (IND)	63	67	69	64	65	328	
	Neeru Dhanda	24	24	24	23	23	118	
	Aashima Ahlawat	20	22	23	19	22	106	
	Manisha Keer	19	21	22	22	20	104	
3rd place, bronze medalist(s)	Kuwait (KUW)	65	65	67	68	60	325	
	Hajar Abdulmalik	22	23	23	23	20	111	
	Shahad Alhawal	22	21	20	22	20	105	
	Sarah Alhawal	21	21	24	23	20	109	
4	Qatar (QAT)	64	66	66	65	63	324	
	Ray Bassil	25	23	23	23	24	118	
	Kholoud Hassan Al-Khalaf	19	24	20	19	21	103	
	Metha Hamad Albinali	20	19	23	23	18	103	
5	Japan (JPN)	65	59	64	65	66	319	
	Nanami Miyasaka	22	21	20	21	21	105	
	Riyo Kiyoshi	22	20	22	23	22	109	
	Chiemi Kojima	21	18	22	21	23	105	
6	Kazakhstan (KAZ)	63	61	64	66	65	319	
	Nargiza Sarmanova	21	22	20	22	20	105	
	Eleonora Ibragimova	20	22	22	23	23	110	
	Milana Papchikhina	22	17	22	21	22	104	
