= Aashima Ahlawat =

Indian sport shooter (born 2003)

Personal information
- Nationality: Indian
- Born: 27 September 2003 (age 23) Kharkara, Haryana, India
- Education: Lady Shri Ram College for Women

Sport
- Sport: Sport shooting
- Event: Trap
Medal record
Women's trap
Representing India
Asian Games
Silver medal – second place	2026 Aichi–Nagoya	Team
Asian Shooting Championships
Gold medal – first place	2025 Shymkent	Team
Bronze medal – third place	2025 Shymkent	Individual

Aashima Ahlawat (born 27 September 2003) is an Indian sport shooter from Haryana. She is representing India in the women's trap individual and team events at the 2026 Asian Games in Japan. Along with Neeru Dhanda and Manisha Keer, she won a silver medal in Women's trap team event.

== Early life ==
Ahlawat is from Kharkara village, Rohtak district, Haryana. She took up shooting at the age of 18 after fulfilling a condition set by her mother to score well in her board exams. She scored 98.6 per cent marks in her Class 12 board examinations and her mother Sumitra Ahlawat, not only allowed her to take up the sport but relocated to Delhi to encourage and support her daughter's training. She completed her graduation in economics at the Lady Shri Ram College for women, Delhi.

== Career ==
In April 2026, she represented India and in the skeet event at the ISSF Shotgun World Cup in Tangier, Morocco. She finished 32nd with a score of 107 (20, 22, 23, 21, 21).

In 2025, she won a team gold and an individual bronze in the women's trap event at the Asian Shooting Championships in Shymkent, Kazakhstan. She shot 25 in the final and later won the team gold along with Neeru Dhanda and Preeti Rajak.

In July 2023, Ahlawat represented India in the women's skeet event at the ISSF World Championship Juniors in Changwon, Korea, and entered the final but could only finish sixth. In October 2024, she finished fourth in the ISSF Junior World Championship in Lima, Peru. She trapped 25 targets in the six-women final. She finished fourth after a miscalculation, and missed a medal due to her higher bib number.
