= Shooting at the 2018 Asian Games – Men's trap =

Men's trap at the 2018 Asian Games
- Venue: Jakabaring Shooting Range
- Dates: 19–20 August 2018
- Competitors: 30 from 16 nations

Medalists
| gold medal | Yang Kun-pi | Chinese Taipei |
| silver medal | Lakshay Sheoran | India |
| bronze medal | Ahn Dae-myeong | South Korea |

The men's trap event at the 2018 Asian Games in Palembang, Indonesia took place on 19–20 August at the Jakabaring International Shooting Range.

== Schedule ==
All times are Western Indonesia Time (UTC+07:00)

| Date | Time | Event |
|---|---|---|
| Sunday, 19 August 2018 | 09:00 | Qualification day 1 |
| Monday, 20 August 2018 | 09:00 | Qualification day 2 |
| Monday, 20 August 2018 | 16:00 | Final |

== Records ==
Prior to this competition, the existing world, Asian and Games records were as follows.

Qualification
| World Record | Giovanni Pellielo (ITA) | 125 | Nicosia, Cyprus | 1 April 1994 |
| Asian Record | Khaled Al-Mudhaf (KUW) | 124 | Atlanta, United States | 14 May 1998 |
| Games Record | Fahad Al-Deehani (KUW) | 123 | Hiroshima, Japan | 8 October 1994 |
Final
| World Record | Alberto Fernández (ESP) | 48 | New Delhi, India | 29 October 2017 |
| Asian Record | Abdulrahman Al-Faihan (KUW) | 39 | Astana, Kazakhstan | 8 August 2017 |
| Games Record | — | — | — | — |

== Results ==
=== Qualification ===
| Rank | Athlete | Day 1 | | | Day 2 | | Total | S-off | Notes |
| Rank | Athlete | 1 | 2 | 3 | 4 | 5 | Total | S-off | Notes |
|---|---|---|---|---|---|---|---|---|---|
| 1 | Manavjit Singh Sandhu (IND) | 25 | 23 | 24 | 22 | 25 | 119 | +12 | |
| 2 | Eum Ji-won (KOR) | 23 | 25 | 23 | 25 | 23 | 119 | +11 | |
| 3 | Ahn Dae-myeong (KOR) | 24 | 23 | 24 | 25 | 23 | 119 | +10 | |
| 4 | Lakshay Sheoran (IND) | 22 | 25 | 24 | 25 | 23 | 119 | +0 | |
| 5 | Hagen Topacio (PHI) | 21 | 25 | 25 | 23 | 24 | 118 | +5 | |
| 6 | Yang Kun-pi (TPE) | 23 | 24 | 24 | 22 | 25 | 118 | +4 | |
| 7 | Alain Moussa (LBN) | 25 | 23 | 23 | 21 | 25 | 117 | | |
| 8 | Khaled Al-Mudhaf (KUW) | 22 | 23 | 23 | 25 | 24 | 117 | | |
| 9 | Abdulrahman Al-Faihan (KUW) | 22 | 24 | 22 | 25 | 24 | 117 | | |
| 10 | Du Yu (CHN) | 23 | 24 | 22 | 24 | 24 | 117 | | |
| 11 | Mohammed Al-Rumaihi (QAT) | 24 | 22 | 24 | 23 | 24 | 117 | | |
| 12 | Viktor Khassyanov (KAZ) | 23 | 23 | 24 | 24 | 23 | 117 | | |
| 13 | Shih Jung-hung (TPE) | 23 | 24 | 23 | 24 | 23 | 117 | | |
| 14 | Muhammad Farrukh Nadeem (PAK) | 24 | 23 | 23 | 24 | 23 | 117 | | |
| 15 | Hamad Al-Kendi (UAE) | 22 | 24 | 24 | 22 | 24 | 116 | | |
| 16 | Han Fei (CHN) | 24 | 23 | 23 | 22 | 24 | 116 | | |
| 17 | Andrey Mogilevskiy (KAZ) | 20 | 21 | 25 | 24 | 25 | 115 | | |
| 18 | Aamer Iqbal (PAK) | 24 | 25 | 23 | 21 | 22 | 115 | | |
| 19 | Savate Sresthaporn (THA) | 23 | 23 | 25 | 23 | 21 | 115 | | |
| 20 | Mohammed Ali Khejaim (QAT) | 21 | 23 | 24 | 23 | 23 | 114 | | |
| 21 | Nguyễn Hoàng Điệp (VIE) | 21 | 23 | 24 | 23 | 22 | 113 | | |
| 22 | Elie Bejjani (LBN) | 23 | 20 | 22 | 23 | 24 | 112 | | |
| 23 | Mohammad Hossein Parvareshnia (IRI) | 23 | 24 | 22 | 19 | 24 | 112 | | |
| 24 | Saif Al-Shamsi (UAE) | 22 | 24 | 21 | 24 | 21 | 112 | | |
| 25 | Lê Nghĩa (VIE) | 22 | 23 | 22 | 23 | 21 | 111 | | |
| 26 | Chen Seong Fook (MAS) | 22 | 24 | 22 | 22 | 20 | 110 | | |
| 27 | Chartchai Ularnwiriyakul (THA) | 19 | 21 | 23 | 19 | 22 | 104 | | |
| 28 | Ali Hafezi (IRI) | 19 | 20 | 23 | 20 | 21 | 103 | | |
| 29 | Slamet Riadi (INA) | 20 | 18 | 21 | 22 | 20 | 101 | | |
| 30 | Bagus Sholeh Aristyawan (INA) | 17 | 20 | 16 | 14 | 17 | 84 | | |

=== Final ===
| Rank | Athlete | 1st stage | | | | 2nd stage – Elimination | | | | | | S-off | Notes |
| Rank | Athlete | 1 | 2 | 3 | 4 | 1 | 2 | 3 | 4 | 5 | 6 | S-off | Notes |
|---|---|---|---|---|---|---|---|---|---|---|---|---|---|
| 1st place, gold medalist(s) | Yang Kun-pi (TPE) | 5 | 10 | 14 | 19 | 23 | 28 | 33 | 38 | 43 | 48 | | AR |
| 2nd place, silver medalist(s) | Lakshay Sheoran (IND) | 4 | 9 | 14 | 18 | 21 | 26 | 29 | 34 | 39 | 43 | | |
| 3rd place, bronze medalist(s) | Ahn Dae-myeong (KOR) | 4 | 9 | 14 | 18 | 21 | 25 | 27 | 30 | | | | |
| 4 | Manavjit Singh Sandhu (IND) | 3 | 8 | 12 | 16 | 21 | 24 | 26 | | | | | |
| 5 | Eum Ji-won (KOR) | 4 | 7 | 12 | 17 | 20 | 23 | | | | | | |
| 6 | Hagen Topacio (PHI) | 2 | 6 | 8 | 13 | 18 | | | | | | | |
