= Shooting at the 2026 Asian Games – Mixed trap team =

Mixed trap team at the 2026 Asian Games
- Venue: Aichi Pref. General Shooting Gallery
- Dates: 30 September 2026
- Competitors: 24 from 12 nations

Medalists
gold medal	India; Kynan Chenai, Neeru Dhanda
silver medal	Qatar; Mohammed Al-Rumaihi, Ray Bassil
bronze medal	China; Qi Ying, Sun Yunong

The mixed trap team competition at the 2026 Asian Games in Aichi Prefecture, Japan was held on 30 September 2026 at the Aichi Pref. General Shooting Gallery.

== Schedule ==
All times are Japan Standard Time (UTC+09:00)

Date	Time	Event
Wednesday, 30 September 2026	10:00	Qualification
Wednesday, 30 September 2026	14:30	Final

== Records ==
Prior to this competition, the existing world, Asian and Games records were as follows.

Qualification
World Record	Australia	149	Acapulco, Mexico	20 March 2019
Asian Record	Kuwait	147	Doha, Qatar	8 November 2019
Games Record	—	—	—	—
Final
World Record	Australia	37	Lonato, Italy	12 July 2026
Asian Record	Qatar	30	Doha, Qatar	21 January 2026
Games Record	—	—	—	—

== Results ==
=== Qualification ===
Rank	Team	Rounds			Total	Notes
Rank	Team	1	2	3	Total	Notes
1	China (CHN)	49	47	46	142	GR
	Qi Ying	25	23	25	73	
	Sun Yunong	24	24	21	69	
2	Qatar (QAT)	48	46	45	139	
	Mohammed Al-Rumaihi	23	22	22	67	
	Ray Bassil	25	24	23	72	
3	Iran (IRI)	47	43	48	138	
	Mohammad Beiranvand	22	23	24	69	
	Marziyeh Parvaresh Nia	25	20	24	69	
4	India (IND)	46	46	44	136	
	Kynan Chenai	24	24	25	73	
	Neeru Dhanda	22	22	19	63	
5	Chinese Taipei (TPE)	44	45	45	134	
	Yang Kun-pi	24	24	24	72	
	Liu Wan-Yu	20	21	21	62	
6	Kazakhstan (KAZ)	49	42	43	134	
	Daniil Pochivalov	25	22	19	66	
	Nargiza Sarmanova	24	20	24	68	
7	South Korea (KOR)	43	45	45	133	
	Ahn Dae-myeong	22	22	23	67	
	Lee Bo-na	21	23	22	66	
8	Japan (JPN)	43	46	44	133	
	Michihide Tamura	23	24	21	68	
	Nanami Miyasaka	20	22	23	65	
9	Kuwait (KUW)	41	45	45	131	
	Talal Al-Rashidi	21	23	24	68	
	Hajar Abdulmalik	20	22	21	63	
10	Thailand (THA)	39	46	45	130	
	Savate Sresthaporn	20	24	24	68	
	Chattaya Kitcharoen	19	22	21	62	
11	Bahrain (BRN)	43	43	44	130	
	Saeed Hasan	20	22	21	63	
	Marwa Buarki	23	21	23	67	
12	Indonesia (INA)	41	41	40	122	
	Andreas Yunus Boki	21	22	22	65	
	Adylia Safitri	20	19	18	57	

=== Final ===
Rank	Team / Athletes	series				Total	S-off	Notes
Rank	Team / Athletes	1	2	3	4	Total	S-off	Notes
1st place, gold medalist(s)	India	6	10	10	8	34		AsR, GR
1st place, gold medalist(s)	Kynan Chenai	4	5	5	5	19		
1st place, gold medalist(s)	Neeru Dhanda	2	5	5	3	15		
2nd place, silver medalist(s)	Qatar	7	9	8	8	32		
2nd place, silver medalist(s)	Mohammed Al-Rumaihi	2	5	4	5	16		
2nd place, silver medalist(s)	Ray Bassil	5	4	4	3	16		
3rd place, bronze medalist(s)	China	6	8	9		23		
3rd place, bronze medalist(s)	Qi Ying	4	4	4		12		
3rd place, bronze medalist(s)	Sun Yunong	2	4	5		11		
4	Iran	6	6			12		
4	Mohammad Beyranvand	3	2			5		
4	Marziyeh Parvaresh Nia	3	4			7		
