= Shooting at the 2022 Asian Games – Women's trap team =

Shooting tournament

Women's trap team at the 2022 Asian Games
- Venue: Fuyang Yinhu Sports Centre
- Dates: 30 September – 1 October 2023
- Competitors: 15 from 5 nations

Medalists
| gold medal | China; Li Qingnian, Wu Cuicui, Zhang Xinqiu |
| silver medal | India; Manisha Keer, Rajeshwari Kumari, Preeti Rajak |
| bronze medal | Kazakhstan; Mariya Dmitriyenko, Aizhan Dosmagambetova, Anastassiya Prilepina |

The women's trap team competition at the 2022 Asian Games in Hangzhou, China was held on 30 September and 1 October 2023 at Fuyang Yinhu Sports Centre.

== Schedule ==
All times are China Standard Time (UTC+08:00)

| Date | Time | Event |
|---|---|---|
| Saturday, 30 September 2023 | 09:00 | Day 1 |
| Sunday, 1 October 2023 | 09:00 | Day 2 |

== Records ==
Prior to this competition, the existing world, Asian and Games records were as follows.

| World Record | United States | 354 | Guadalajara, Mexico | 5 November 2018 |
| Asian Record | China | 344 | Kuwait City, Kuwait | 9 November 2018 |
| Games Record | — | — | — | — |

== Results ==
| Rank | Team | Day 1 | | | Day 2 | | Total | Notes |
| Rank | Team | 1 | 2 | 3 | 4 | 5 | Total | Notes |
|---|---|---|---|---|---|---|---|---|
| 1st place, gold medalist(s) | China (CHN) | 70 | 74 | 72 | 72 | 69 | 357 | WR |
| | Li Qingnian | 20 | 25 | 24 | 24 | 22 | 115 | |
| | Wu Cuicui | 25 | 25 | 25 | 25 | 24 | 124 | |
| | Zhang Xinqiu | 25 | 24 | 23 | 23 | 23 | 118 | |
| 2nd place, silver medalist(s) | India (IND) | 71 | 67 | 62 | 67 | 70 | 337 | |
| | Manisha Keer | 24 | 23 | 19 | 25 | 23 | 114 | |
| | Rajeshwari Kumari | 23 | 22 | 20 | 22 | 24 | 111 | |
| | Preeti Rajak | 24 | 22 | 23 | 20 | 23 | 112 | |
| 3rd place, bronze medalist(s) | Kazakhstan (KAZ) | 68 | 66 | 69 | 66 | 67 | 336 | |
| | Mariya Dmitriyenko | 22 | 23 | 25 | 23 | 22 | 115 | |
| | Aizhan Dosmagambetova | 24 | 21 | 23 | 22 | 24 | 114 | |
| | Anastassiya Prilepina | 22 | 22 | 21 | 21 | 21 | 107 | |
| 4 | South Korea (KOR) | 66 | 68 | 66 | 66 | 64 | 330 | |
| | Cho Seon-ah | 20 | 25 | 22 | 24 | 22 | 113 | |
| | Kang Gee-eun | 22 | 23 | 23 | 19 | 20 | 107 | |
| | Lee Bo-na | 24 | 20 | 21 | 23 | 22 | 110 | |
| 5 | Kuwait (KUW) | 67 | 66 | 60 | 60 | 65 | 318 | |
| | Hajar Abdulmalik | 20 | 23 | 19 | 19 | 21 | 102 | |
| | Sarah Al-Hawal | 22 | 19 | 20 | 21 | 20 | 102 | |
| | Shahad Al-Hawal | 25 | 24 | 21 | 20 | 24 | 114 | |
