= Neeru Dhanda =

Indian sport shooter (born 2000)

Personal information
- Born: May 25, 2000 (age 26) Jind, Haryana

Sport
- Country: India
- Sport: Shooting
- Event: Trap
- Coached by: Peter Wilson
Medal record
Trap shooting
Representing India
Event	1st	2nd	3rd
Asian Games	2	1	0
Asian Championships	2	0	0
World Cup	1	0	1
Total	5	1	1
Asian Games
Gold medal – first place	2026 Aichi–Nagoya	Individual
Gold medal – first place	2026 Aichi–Nagoya	Mixed team
Silver medal – second place	2026 Aichi–Nagoya	Team
Asian Championships
Gold medal – first place	2025 Shymkent	Individual
Gold medal – first place	2025 Shymkent	Team
World Cup
Gold medal – first place	2026 Lonato del Garda	Individual
Bronze medal – third place	2026 Almaty	Mixed team

Neeru Dhanda (born 25 May 2000) is an Indian sport shooter who competes in trap shooting. She won the women's trap individual and team gold medals at the 2025 Asian Shooting Championships. In 2026, she won the women's trap gold medal at the ISSF Shotgun World Cup in Lonato del Garda, becoming the first Indian woman to win a World Cup gold medal in the event. She also won two gold and a silver medal in 2026 Asian Games.

== Early life ==
Dhanda hails from Jind district, Haryana. Her family moved from Jind to Shivpuri, Madhya Pradesh, when she later took up shooting. She developed an interest in shooting after watching her maternal cousin Lakshay Sheoran win the silver medal in the men's trap event at the 2018 Asian Games. She initially practiced by shooting at tin cans with a family-owned double-barrel gun and later trained with Sheoran before joining the Madhya Pradesh State Shooting Academy after clearing its selection trials.

== Career ==
Dhanda competed at the 2022 ISSF World Championships in Osijek, Croatia, where she finished 29th in the women's trap event.

In May 2025, Dhanda won the women's trap event at the Second Shotgun National Trials in New Delhi, defeating Aashima Ahlawat 40–39 in the final. She won the gold medal in the women's trap event at the 38th National Games. In August 2025, she won gold medals in the women's trap individual and team events at the 2025 Asian Shooting Championships in Shymkent, Kazakhstan.

Dhanda and Vivaan Kapoor won the bronze medal in the mixed team trap event at the ISSF Shotgun World Cup in Almaty, Kazakhstan in 2026. Later in July 2026, she won the women's trap gold medal at the ISSF Shotgun World Cup in Lonato del Garda, Italy, becoming the first Indian woman to win a World Cup gold medal in the event.

== Military career ==
Dhanda joined the Corps of Military Police after the Indian Army opened rank-and-file recruitment to women. She later became a Naib Subedar and trains at the Army Marksmanship Unit in Mhow, Madhya Pradesh.
