= Shooting at the 2018 Asian Games – Women's trap =

Women's trap at the 2018 Asian Games
- Venue: Jakabaring Shooting Range
- Dates: 19–20 August 2018
- Competitors: 25 from 14 nations

Medalists
gold medal	Zhang Xinqiu	China
silver medal	Kang Gee-eun	South Korea
bronze medal	Ray Bassil	Lebanon

The women's trap event at the 2018 Asian Games in Palembang, Indonesia took place on 19–20 August at the Jakabaring International Shooting Range.

== Schedule ==
All times are Western Indonesia Time (UTC+07:00)

Date	Time	Event
Sunday, 19 August 2018	08:00	Qualification day 1
Monday, 20 August 2018	08:00	Qualification day 2
Monday, 20 August 2018	14:00	Final

== Records ==
Prior to this competition, the existing world, Asian and Games records were as follows.

Qualification
World Record	Alessandra Perilli (SMR)	122	Changwon, South Korea	23 April 2018
Asian Record	Wang Xiaojing (CHN)	119	Changwon, South Korea	23 April 2018
Games Record	—	—	—	—
Final
World Record	Ashley Carroll (USA)	48	Guadalajara, Mexico	5 March 2018
Asian Record	Wang Xiaojing (CHN)	45	Larnaca, Cyprus	5 May 2017
Games Record	—	—	—	—

== Results ==
=== Qualification ===
Rank	Athlete	Day 1			Day 2		Total	S-off	Notes
Rank	Athlete	1	2	3	4	5	Total	S-off	Notes
1	Mariya Dmitriyenko (KAZ)	24	25	25	22	23	119	+2	GR
2	Ray Bassil (LBN)	24	24	22	24	25	119	+1	GR
3	Liu Wan-yu (TPE)	24	23	24	24	23	118		
4	Zhang Xinqiu (CHN)	21	24	24	24	24	117		
5	Kang Gee-eun (KOR)	23	24	24	20	25	116	+4	
6	Seema Tomar (IND)	24	23	24	23	22	116	+3	
7	Shreyasi Singh (IND)	22	24	25	20	25	116	+0	
8	Wang Xiaojing (CHN)	22	24	23	23	24	116	+0	
9	Lee Bo-na (KOR)	20	24	23	23	24	114		
10	Pak Yong-hui (PRK)	22	22	24	22	22	112		
11	Amna Al-Abdulla (QAT)	22	24	21	22	22	111		
12	Lin Yi-chun (TPE)	23	23	20	24	21	111		
13	Shahad Al-Hawal (KUW)	22	18	24	23	23	110		
14	Shiva Farahpour (IRI)	21	25	19	22	23	110		
15	Sarah Al-Hawal (KUW)	24	20	21	19	25	109		
16	Chattaya Kitcharoen (THA)	23	23	18	23	21	108		
17	Anastassiya Davydova (KAZ)	22	21	22	21	21	107		
18	Napapha Pramuanchok (THA)	22	22	21	21	21	107		
19	Sepideh Sirani (IRI)	20	23	24	19	21	107		
20	Yukie Nakayama (JPN)	24	22	19	20	21	106		
21	Kim Yong-bok (PRK)	20	22	22	21	20	105		
22	Kholoud Al-Khalaf (QAT)	21	24	20	21	19	105		
23	Sylvia Silimang (INA)	19	18	22	19	18	96		
24	Sarmunah (INA)	19	21	16	15	19	90		
25	Zorigoogiin Namduun (MGL)	6	2	2	1	1	12		

=== Final ===
Rank	Athlete	1st stage				2nd stage – Elimination						S-off	Notes
Rank	Athlete	1	2	3	4	1	2	3	4	5	6	S-off	Notes
1st place, gold medalist(s)	Zhang Xinqiu (CHN)	4	9	14	17	22	27	31	36	40	45		GR
2nd place, silver medalist(s)	Kang Gee-eun (KOR)	5	10	13	17	22	26	31	36	40	44		
3rd place, bronze medalist(s)	Ray Bassil (LBN)	4	7	12	17	22	26	31	34				
4	Mariya Dmitriyenko (KAZ)	4	8	13	17	18	23	27					
5	Liu Wan-yu (TPE)	5	8	10	12	16	19						
6	Seema Tomar (IND)	0	4	6	10	12							
