= Zhang Xinqiu =

Chinese sport shooter

Medal record

Women's shooting

Asian Games
Gold medal – first place	2018 Jakarta	Trap
Gold medal – first place	2022 Hangzhou	Trap

Asian Championships
Gold medal – first place	2017 Astana	Trap
Gold medal – first place	2017 Astana	Trap team
Gold medal – first place	2018 Kuwait City	Trap team
Gold medal – first place	2019 Almaty	Trap team
Gold medal – first place	2023 Changwon	Trap team
Gold medal – first place	2024 Kuwait City	Trap team
Silver medal – second place	2024 Kuwait City	Trap
Bronze medal – third place	2018 Kuwait City	Trap

Zhang Xinqiu (simplified Chinese: 张鑫秋; traditional Chinese: 張鑫秋; pinyin: Zhāng Xīnqiū) is a Chinese sport shooter. She won a gold medal in trap shooting at the 2018 Asian Games.
