= Lakshay Sheoran =

Indian sport shooter

Personal information
- Nationality: Indian
- Born: 4 November 1998 (age 27) Jind, Haryana, India

Sport
- Country: India
- Sport: Shooting
- Event: Trap Shooting
Medal record
Men's shooting
Representing India
Asian Games
| Silver medal – second place | 2018 Palembang | Trap |
Asian Championships
| Bronze medal – third place | 2024 Kuwait City | Trap |
- Updated on 20 August 2018

Lakshay Sheoran (born 4 November 1998) is an Indian sport shooter. He won silver medal in trap shooting at the 2018 Asian Games.

== Early life ==
Sheoran was born in Jind, Haryana, on 4 November 1998. He is the son of a former wrestling national champion, Somveer pehalwan.

== Career ==
Sheoran started training for shooting in 2014. He initially started air pistol shooting but later switched to shotgun shooting after visiting Dr. Karni Singh Shooting Range.

Representing Haryana state, he became national junior champion in the 2016 National Shooting Championships after defeating Manavaditya Singh Rathore of Rajasthan in the men's trap event. He won his second junior national title in 2017 after defeating Rajasthan's Vivaan Kapoor by 41–39.

=== International ===
At the 2017 ISSF Junior World Cup in Italy, Sheoran was paired with Manisha Keer for the mixed team event. The pair scored 84 out of 100 to qualify for the final round. In the final, they won bronze medal after defeating Sevin Edward Layer and Emma Lee Williams of United States by 34–33. Paired with Vivaan Kapoor and Ali Aman Elahi for the men's trap team event at the 2018 ISSF Junior World Cup, he won bronze medal after the trio scored 328. The gold and silver medallist teams of China and Australia scored 335 and 331 respectively. He achieved country's apex ranking in trap shooting after defeating Manavjit Singh Sandhu and Kynan Chenai in the trials for 2018 Asian Games.

At his maiden appearance in the Asian Games in 2018, he won silver medal (with a score of 43) after losing to Chinese Taipei's Yang Kun-pi's world record-equalling score of 48 in the final. He is one of the three Asian Games silver medallists in the men's trap event from India. The other two were Karni Singh (in 1974) and Manavjit Singh Sandhu (in 2006).

He missed the Olympic quota berth at the Asian Olympic Qualification Tournament in Kuwait City on 15 January, despite winning a bronze as there were only two berths. After leading the field, he missed the berth at the fag end.
