= Preeti Rajak =

Indian sport shooter (born 2002)

Personal information
- Born: 6 November 2002 (age 23) Itarsi, Madhya Pradesh, India
- Education: Indira Gandhi National Open University
- Military career
- Branch: Indian Army
- Service years: 2022–present
- Rank: Subedar
- Unit: Corps of Military Police

Sport
- Sport: Shooting
- Event: Trap
Medal record
Women's shooting
Representing India
Asian Games
| Silver medal – second place | 2022 Hangzhou | Trap team |
Asian Championships
| Gold medal – first place | 2025 Shymkent | Trap team |
Junior World Cup
| Silver medal – second place | 2022 Suhl | Trap team |

Preeti Rajak (born 6 November 2002) is an Indian sport shooter who specializes in the trap event. She is a Junior Commissioned Officer in the Indian Army, where she became the first woman to attain the rank of Subedar. Rajak has represented India in various international shooting competitions.

== Early life ==
Preeti family in Itarsi in Narmadapuram district of Madhya Pradesh. Her mother Jyotsna Rajak is a social worker. Her father took interest in her sports and admitted her at the Madhya Pradesh Shooting Academy in 2015. She learnt her basics from coach Indrajeet. Preeti has another sister. In 2023, Preeti secured employment with the Indian Army and now she trains at the Indian Army Range. In January 2024, she became the first woman to reach subedar rank in the Indian Army.

== Career ==
Rajak represented the senior Indian team from 2022. In August 2023, she represented Indian trap team in the World Shotgun Championship at Baku, Azerbaijan. Earlier on May 27 and 28, she participated in the Shotgun World Cup at Almaty, Kazakhstan. In May 2023, she also took part in the Shotgun World Cup in Cairo, Egypt and also represented India at the Shotgun World Cup at Doha in March 2023.

In September 2022, she took part in the trap event at the Junior World Shotgun Championships at Osijek, Croatia. In July 2022, she represented India in the trap events of the World Shotgun Championships at Changwon, South Korea. In May 2022, she was part of the Senior India team that won silver in the ISSF Junior World Cup in Suhl, Germany.

In July 2019, she was part of the Indian team at the Junior World Shotgun Championships at Lonato, Italy.
