= Takako Sato =

Japanese basketball player

No. 25 – Prestige International Aranmare
- Position: Small forward
- League: Women's Japan Basketball League

Personal information
- Born: 19 July 2002 (age 24) Sano, Tochigi, Japan
- Listed height: 176 cm (5 ft 9 in)

Career information
- College: Hakuoh University

Career history
- 2025–present: Prestige International Aranmare
Medals
Women's basketball
Representing Japan
Asian Games
| Silver medal – second place | 2026 Aichi–Nagoya | Team |

Takako Sato (Japanese: 佐藤 多伽子, born 19 July 2002) is a Japanese professional basketball player who plays as a small forward for Prestige International Aranmare in the Women's Japan Basketball League. She has represented Japan in international competitions, including the FIBA Under-19 Women's Basketball World Cup and the Summer World University Games. She was also a member of Japan's women's basketball team that won the silver medal at the 2026 Asian Games.

== Early life and education ==
Sato was born on 19 July 2002 in Sano, Tochigi Prefecture, Japan. She attended Ōka Gakuen High School before enrolling at Hakuoh University, where she played for the university's women's basketball team. During her university career, she helped Hakuoh compete in national collegiate competitions.

== Career ==
Sato represented Japan at the 2021 FIBA Under-19 Women's Basketball World Cup. She played seven games in the tournament, averaging 6 points and 3.6 rebounds per game. Japan finished ninth in the competition.

While attending Hakuoh University, Sato continued to develop as a forward and competed in Japanese collegiate basketball. In November 2024, the university announced that she would join Prestige International Aranmare through the Women's Japan Basketball League's early-entry system for the 2024–25 season. She subsequently became part of the professional club based in Akita Prefecture, wearing jersey number 25 and using the court name Lara.

In 2024, Sato was part of Hakuoh University's team that won the All-Japan Intercollegiate Basketball Championship. She was recognised as the tournament's most valuable player, according to the club's published team programme.

Sato represented Japan at the 2025 Summer World University Games in Germany. Japan finished fifth in the women's basketball competition. Her performances at the university and professional levels led to further involvement with the senior national-team programme.

In 2026, Sato was selected for Japan's senior women's national team and represented the country at the Asian Games in Aichi and Nagoya. Japan reached the women's basketball final and won the silver medal. The Japanese Olympic Committee lists Sato among the members of the team that finished second in the competition.
