= Mio Shiraishi =

Japanese basketball player

No. 30 – Denso Iris
- Position: Small forward / Center
- League: Women's Japan Basketball League

Personal information
- Born: April 17, 2006 (age 20) Hiroshima Prefecture, Japan
- Listed height: 184 cm (6 ft 0 in)

Career history
- 2025–: Denso Iris
Medals
Women's basketball
Representing Japan
Asian Games
| Silver medal – second place | 2026 Aichi–Nagoya | Team |

Mio Shiraishi (Japanese: 白石 弥桜; born 17 April 2006) is a Japanese basketball player who plays for Denso Iris in the Women's Japan Basketball League. She has represented Japan in international basketball, including at the FIBA Under-19 Women's Basketball World Cup and the women's basketball tournament at the 2026 Asian Games, where she won a silver medal.

== Career ==
Shiraishi was born on 17 April 2006 in Hiroshima Prefecture, Japan. She attended Oka Gakuen High School, where she developed as a basketball player. She plays primarily as a small forward for Denso Iris and has also been listed as a center in international competition.

In 2025, Shiraishi represented Japan at the FIBA Under-19 Women's Basketball World Cup in Brno, Czech Republic. She appeared in six games, averaging 2.8 points, 2.7 rebounds and 1.2 assists per game.

Shiraishi was selected for Japan's women's national basketball team for the 2026 Asian Games in Aichi and Nagoya. Japan finished second in the tournament, earning the silver medal. Shiraishi was one of the players named in the national team's final roster and subsequently reflected on the team's performance through the Japan Basketball Association.
