= Yang Kun-pi =

Taiwanese sport shooter

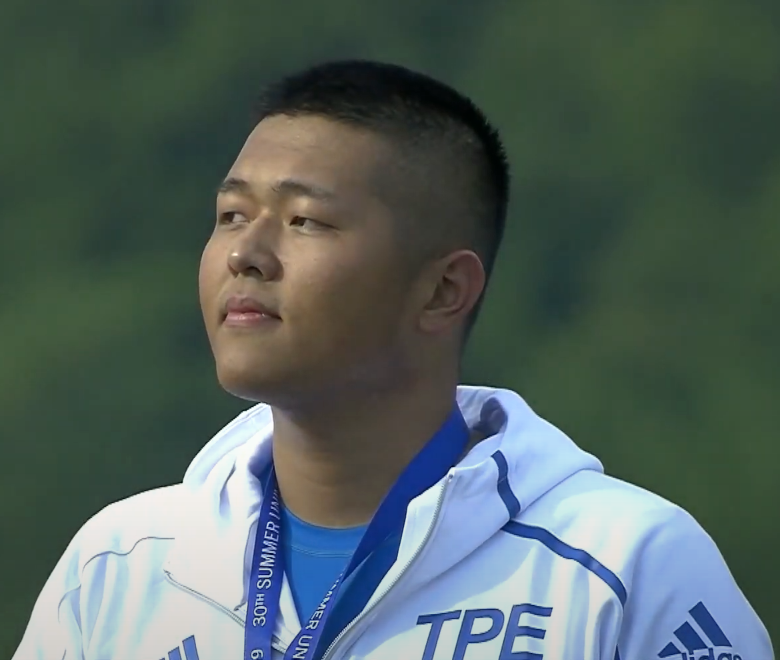
- Yang Kun-pi as the winner of trap event at the 2019 Summer Universiade

Personal information
- Nationality: Taiwanese
- Born: 11 August 1998 (age 28)

Sport
- Country: Chinese Taipei
- Sport: Shooting
- Event: Trap
Medal record
Men's shooting
Representing Chinese Taipei
World Championships
Bronze medal – third place	2022 Osijek	Trap
Asian Games
Gold medal – first place	2018 Jakarta-Palembang	Trap
Silver medal – second place	2018 Jakarta-Palembang	Mixed team trap
Silver medal – second place	2026 Aichi-Nagoya	Trap
Asian Championships
Bronze medal – third place	2019 Doha	Mixed team trap
Bronze medal – third place	2025 Shymkent	Mixed team trap

Yang Kun-pi (born August 11, 1998) is a Taiwanese sport shooter. He placed 25th in the men's trap event at the 2016 Summer Olympics.
