= Du Yu (sport shooter) =

Chinese sport shooter (born 1986)

Medal record

Men's shooting

Representing China

Asian Championships
Gold medal – first place	2011 Kuala Lumpur	Trap team
Gold medal – first place	2018 Kuwait City	Trap
Silver medal – second place	2011 Kuala Lumpur	Trap
Silver medal – second place	2018 Kuwait City	Trap team
Bronze medal – third place	2018 Kuwait City	Mixed trap team

Du Yu (Chinese: 杜宇; pinyin: Dù Yǔ; born 19 October 1986 in Henan) is a Chinese trap shooter. He competed in the trap event at the 2012 Summer Olympics and placed 30th in the qualification round.
