= Suzuno Higuchi =

Japanese basketball player

No. 18 – Hitachi High-Tech Cougars
- Position: Point guard
- League: Women's Japan Basketball League

Personal information
- Born: June 12, 2001 (age 25) Fukuoka, Japan
- Listed height: 164 cm (5 ft 5 in)
Medals
Women's basketball
Representing Japan
Asian Games
Silver medal – second place	2026 Aichi–Nagoya	Team

Suzuno Higuchi (Japanese: 樋口 鈴乃, romanized: Higuchi Suzuno; born 12 June 2001) is a Japanese professional basketball player who plays as a point guard for the Hitachi High-Tech Cougars in the Women's Japan Basketball League. She represented Japan at the 2026 Asian Games, where she won a silver medal in the women's basketball tournament.

== Career ==
Higuchi was born in Fukuoka, Japan. She attended Seika Girls' High School before playing college basketball at Hakuoh University. She joined the Prestige International Aranmare team in 2024 and moved to the Hitachi High-Tech Cougars in 2025.

During the 2024–25 season, Higuchi played for Aranmare Akita in the W League. She was named Rookie of the Year and led the league in scoring, averaging 17.1 points per game. She also won the league's Future League scoring title and was recognised for her playmaking in the following season. At the end of the 2024–25 season, Aranmare announced that she would leave the club before joining Hitachi High-Tech.

Higuchi represented Japan at the 2025 Summer World University Games in Rhine-Ruhr, Germany. The Japanese women's basketball team finished fifth in the tournament.

In September 2026, Higuchi competed for Japan at the 2026 Asian Games in Aichi and Nagoya. Japan reached the women's basketball final against South Korea and won the silver medal. The Japanese Olympic Committee lists the result in Higuchi's athlete profile.
