= Nana Santa =

Japanese basketball player

No. 17 – ENEOS Sunflowers
- Position: Small forward
- League: Women's Japan Basketball League

Personal information
- Born: October 2, 2002 (age 24) Niigata Prefecture, Japan
- Listed height: 179 cm (5 ft 10 in)

Career history
- 2021–: ENEOS Sunflowers
Medals
Women's basketball
Representing Japan
Asian Games
Silver medal – second place	2026 Aichi–Nagoya	Team

Nana Santa (Japanese: 三田 七南, romanized: Santa Nana; born 2 October 2002) is a Japanese basketball player who plays as a small forward for ENEOS Sunflowers in the Women's Japan Basketball League. She has represented Japan in international competition, including the FIBA Under-19 Women's Basketball World Cup and the women's basketball tournament at the 2026 Asian Games, where she won a silver medal.

== Early life ==
Santa was born on 2 October 2002 in Niigata Prefecture, Japan. She played youth basketball with Sakaiwa MBC and Niigata Ryuto Junior High School before attending Showa Gakuin High School in Chiba Prefecture. While at high school, she competed in national tournaments, including the Winter Cup, Japan's national high school basketball championship.

== Club career ==
In April 2021, Santa joined ENEOS Sunflowers as a rookie after graduating from Showa Gakuin High School. She plays as a small forward and wears number 17 for the team in the Women's Japan Basketball League.

During her time with ENEOS, Santa has continued to develop as a forward and has been included in the club's senior roster. In the 2023–24 season, she was described in Japanese basketball coverage as part of the team's emerging generation of players, with opportunities in the starting lineup.

== International career ==
=== Youth national team ===
Santa represented Japan at the FIBA Under-19 Women's Basketball World Cup in 2021, held in Debrecen, Hungary. She played in all seven games, averaging 4 points and 3.4 rebounds per game. Japan finished the tournament in ninth place. Her selection for the tournament was also announced by ENEOS Sunflowers.

=== Senior national team ===
In August 2026, Santa was selected for Japan's women's five-a-side basketball team for the 2026 Asian Games in Aichi and Nagoya. She was listed as a 179 cm small forward in the squad announcement by ENEOS and the Japan Basketball Association.

Japan advanced to the final, where it lost to South Korea 75–70 and finished with the silver medal. Santa's participation and medal were recorded by the Japanese Olympic Committee. Following the tournament, she expressed pride in the team and disappointment at narrowly missing the gold medal.
