= Manisha Keer =

Indian sport shooter

Personal information
- Nationality: Indian

Sport
- Country: India
- Sport: shooting
Medal record
Women's shooting
Representing India
Asian Games
Silver medal – second place	2022 Hangzhou	Trap team
Silver medal – second place	2026 Aichi–Nagoya	Trap team
Asian Championships
Silver medal – second place	2024 Kuwait City	Trap team

Manisha Keer is an Indian sport shooter. She won a silver medal at the ISSF World Cup shotgun in Cairo in the team trap shooting along with Kirti Gupta and Rajeshwari Kumari. She won the Silver medal in the Women's trap team event in the 2022 Asian Games.
