= Maika Miura =

Japanese basketball player

Toyota Antelopes
- Position: Shooting guard
- League: W League

Personal information
- Born: August 13, 2001 (age 25) Miyagi Prefecture, Japan
- Listed height: 1.70 m (5 ft 7 in)

Career information
- College: Hakuoh University
- Playing career: 2024–present

Career history
- 2024–present: Toyota Antelopes
Medals
Representing Japan
Women's basketball
Asian Games
Silver medal – second place	2026 Aichi–Nagoya	Team
Summer World University Games
Silver medal – second place	2021 Chengdu	Team

Maika Miura (Japanese: 三浦 舞華, born 13 August 2001) is a Japanese basketball player who plays as a shooting guard for the Toyota Antelopes in the W League. She has represented Japan in international competitions, including the FIBA U17 Women's Basketball World Cup and the Asian Games.

== Career ==
Miura was born in Miyagi Prefecture, Japan, and began playing basketball during elementary school. She attended Seika Girls' High School in Fukuoka Prefecture before enrolling at Hakuoh University in Tochigi Prefecture. In 2019, she helped her high school team reach the quarter-finals of the All Japan High School Basketball Championship.

While at Hakuoh University, Miura helped the team win the All Japan Intercollegiate Basketball Championship in 2023. That year, she was selected for Japan's university national team and won a silver medal at the 2023 Summer World University Games. She also represented Japan at the 2017 FIBA U16 Women's Asia Championship and the 2018 FIBA U17 Women's Basketball World Cup.

After graduating from university, Miura joined the Toyota Antelopes, a club competing in Japan's W League. She also represented Japan at the 2025 Summer World University Games, where the team finished fifth. In the 2025–26 W League season, Toyota finished as runners-up.

In 2026, Miura represented Japan in the women's basketball tournament at the Aichi–Nagoya Asian Games, where the Japanese team won the silver medal.
