= Ami Tsuneta =

Japanese basketball player

No. 13 – Denso Iris
- Position: Point guard
- League: Women's Japan Basketball League

Personal information
- Born: 18 September 1999 (age 27) Fukuoka Prefecture, Japan
- Listed height: 165 cm (5 ft 5 in)

Career information
- College: Tokyo Healthcare University

Career history
- 2022–present: Denso Iris
Medals
Women's basketball
Representing Japan
Asian Games
Silver medal – second place	2026 Aichi–Nagoya	Team
FIBA Asia Under-16 Championship for Women
Silver medal – second place	2015 Medan	Team

Ami Tsuneta (Japanese: 常田 亜美, born 18 September 1999), also known as Ami Kimura (Japanese: 木村 亜美), is a Japanese professional basketball player who plays as a point guard for Denso Iris in the Women's Japan Basketball League. She represents Japan in international basketball competitions under the name Ami Tsuneta and was a member of the Japanese women's team that won the silver medal at the 2026 Asian Games.

== Early life and education ==
Tsuneta was born on 18 September 1999 in Fukuoka Prefecture, Japan. She attended Tokyo Seitoku University High School before enrolling at Tokyo Healthcare University, where she played for the university's women's basketball team. During her university career, she served as team captain and helped the team compete in national collegiate tournaments.

== Career ==
Tsuneta represented Japan at the 2015 FIBA Asia Under-16 Championship for Women, where the Japanese team finished as runners-up. She subsequently continued her development at Tokyo Healthcare University and was considered for Japan's university national team programme.

In December 2021, Denso Iris announced that Kimura would join the club as an early-entry player from January 2022. She subsequently became a regular member of the Denso Iris roster in the Women's Japan Basketball League. Playing as a point guard, she has been involved in organising the team's offence and distributing the ball to teammates. Her club profile lists her height as 165.5 cm and her court nickname as Rimi.

Kimura has also taken part in Japan's senior women's national-team programme. In May 2025, she was named among the players invited to the national-team selection camp. The following year, Denso Iris announced her selection for Japan's squad for the 2026 Asian Games, noting that she would compete internationally under the registered name Ami Tsuneta.

At the 2026 Asian Games in Aichi and Nagoya, Tsuneta represented Japan in the women's basketball competition. Japan reached the final but lost to South Korea, earning the silver medal. The Japanese Olympic Committee records her as a member of the silver-medal-winning team.
