= Ufuoma Tanaka =

Japanese basketball player

Toyota Antelopes
- Position: Power forward
- League: Women's Japan Basketball League

Personal information
- Born: 10 February 2002 (age 24) Saitama Prefecture, Japan
- Listed height: 181 cm (5 ft 11 in)

Career information
- College: Hakuoh University

Career history
- 2024–present: Toyota Antelopes
Medals
Women's basketball
Representing Japan
Asian Games
Silver medal – second place	2026 Aichi–Nagoya	Team
Summer World University Games
Silver medal – second place	2023 Chengdu	Team

Ufuoma Tanaka (Japanese: 田中 平和, born 10 February 2002) is a Japanese basketball player who plays as a power forward for the Toyota Antelopes in the Women's Japan Basketball League. She has represented Japan in international basketball competitions, including the FIBA Under-19 Women's Basketball World Cup, the Summer World University Games and the Asian Games. She won silver medals with Japan at the 2023 Summer World University Games and the 2026 Asian Games.

== Early life and education ==
Tanaka was born on 10 February 2002 in Saitama Prefecture, Japan. She attended Kamiaoki Junior High School and Ōka Gakuen High School before enrolling at Hakuoh University, where she played collegiate basketball.

== Career ==
Tanaka represented Japan at the 2021 FIBA Under-19 Women's Basketball World Cup. She appeared in seven games and averaged 5.9 points and 5.4 rebounds per game. Japan finished ninth in the tournament's final classification.

While attending Hakuoh University, Tanaka competed in university basketball and represented Japan at the 2023 Summer World University Games in Chengdu, China. The Japanese women's team won the silver medal in the basketball competition.

Tanaka joined the Toyota Antelopes, a Japanese women's professional basketball club, after completing her university career in 2024. She plays as a power forward and has continued to compete in domestic league basketball while participating in Japan's national-team programme.

In 2025, Tanaka was selected to represent Japan at the FIBA 3x3 U23 World Cup. She had also competed at the 2023 World University Games, where Japan won silver, and the 2025 World University Games, where the team finished fifth. Her participation in these competitions reflected her involvement in both Japan's five-on-five and 3x3 basketball programmes.

Tanaka was selected for Japan's women's basketball team at the 2026 Asian Games in Aichi and Nagoya. Japan advanced to the final, where it lost 75–70 to South Korea to finish with the silver medal. Tanaka was listed by the Japanese Olympic Committee as a member of the silver-medal-winning team.
