= Maho Awatani =

Japanese basketball player

No. 45 – Hitachi High-Tech Cougars
- Position: Power forward

Personal information
- Born: December 6, 2002 (age 23) Ibaraki Prefecture, Japan
- Listed height: 182 cm (6 ft 0 in)

Career information
- College: Tsukuba University

Career history
- 2025–: Hitachi High-Tech Cougars
Medals
Women's basketball
Representing Japan
Asian Games
Silver medal – second place	2026 Aichi–Nagoya	Team

Maho Awatani (Japanese: 粟谷 真帆; born 6 December 2002) is a Japanese basketball player who plays as a power forward for the Hitachi High-Tech Cougars. She represented Japan in international competition, including the women's basketball tournament at the 2026 Asian Games, where Japan won the silver medal.

== Career ==
Awatani was born on 6 December 2002 in Ibaraki Prefecture, Japan. She attended Yakumo Gakuen High School before studying at the University of Tsukuba, where she played for the university's women's basketball team. During her university career, she also represented Japan at youth and university-level basketball events.

In 2021, Awatani represented Japan at the FIBA Under-19 Women's Basketball World Cup. She appeared in all seven of Japan's games, averaging 3.7 points and 3.6 rebounds per game.

After graduating from the University of Tsukuba, Awatani joined the Hitachi High-Tech Cougars, a Japanese women's basketball club. She plays as a power forward and wears number 45.

Awatani was selected for Japan's women's basketball team at the 2026 Asian Games in Aichi and Nagoya. Japan finished second in the tournament, earning the silver medal after losing the final to South Korea, 75–70.
