= Ray Bassil =

Qatari trap shooter

Personal information
- Native name: راي باسيل
- Born: Ray Jacques Bassil; 20 October 1988 (age 37) Dlebta, Lebanon
- Education: Notre Dame University–Louaize
- Height: 1.76 m (5 ft 9 in)
- Weight: 63 kg (139 lb)

Sport
- Country: Qatar
- Sport: Shooting
- Event: Trap
- Turned pro: 2006
- Coached by: Daniele Di Spigno
Medal record
Women's trap shooting
Representing Qatar
Asian Games
Silver medal – second place	2026 Aichi–Nagoya	Mixed trap team
Asian Championships
Silver medal – second place	2025 Shymkent	Trap
Representing Lebanon
World Cup Final
Bronze medal – third place	2017 New Delhi	Trap
World Cup
Gold medal – first place	2016 Nicosia	Trap
Silver medal – second place	2016 Rio de Janeiro	Trap
Silver medal – second place	2016 Baku	Trap
Silver medal – second place	2017 Larnaka	Trap
Asian Games
Gold medal – first place	2018 Jakarta-Palembang	Mixed trap
Bronze medal – third place	2018 Jakarta-Palembang	Trap
Asian Championships
Gold medal – first place	2019 Doha	Trap
Gold medal – first place	2019 Almaty	Mixed trap
Gold medal – first place	2023 Changwon	Trap
Silver medal – second place	2009 Almaty	Trap
Silver medal – second place	2015 Kuwait City	Trap
Silver medal – second place	2017 Astana	Trap
Bronze medal – third place	2016 Abu Dhabi	Trap
Junior World Championships
Bronze medal – third place	2007 Nicosia	Trap

Ray Bassil (Arabic: راي باسيل; born 20 October 1988) is a Qatari trap shooter. She previously represented Lebanon, competing in four consecutive Olympic Games— 2012, 2016, 2020, and 2024.

== Career ==
Bassil started trap-shooting aged eight, encouraged by her father Jacques. She began her competitive career in 2006. In 2007, Bassil won her first medal at the ISSF Junior World Championships held in Nicosia, Cyprus, winning bronze. She represented Lebanon at the 2012 Summer Olympics in London, finishing 18th, and at the 2016 Summer Olympics in Rio de Janeiro, where she finished 14th.

Bassil won her first career gold medal at the 2016 ISSF World Cup held in Nicosia. With her gold medal win at the 2019 Asian Shooting Championships in Doha, Qatar, she qualified to the 2020 Summer Olympics in Tokyo. Bassil was Lebanon's flag bearer at the 2020 Olympics; she finished the women's trap event in 21st place.

She was the only person to compete for Lebanon through qualification at the 2024 Summer Olympics in Paris. She trained in Lebanon and Italy.

== Personal life ==
Bassil graduated with a bachelor's degree in Food and Beverage Management from Notre Dame University–Louaize. She speaks three languages: Arabic, English and French.

== Olympic results ==
Olympic results
Event	2012	2016	2020	2024
Trap	18th 64	14th 65	21st 114	21st 114
