= Riho Akagi =

Japanese basketball player

No. 9 – Fujitsu Red Wave
- Position: Shooting guard
- League: Women's Japan Basketball League

Personal information
- Born: 4 August 1998 (age 28) Ōita Prefecture, Japan
- Listed height: 167 cm (5 ft 6 in)

Career information
- College: Tokyo Healthcare University
Medals
Women's basketball
Representing Japan
Asian Games
Silver medal – second place	2026 Aichi–Nagoya	Team

Riho Akagi (Japanese: 赤木 里帆, born 4 August 1998) is a Japanese professional basketball player who plays as a guard for Fujitsu Red Wave in the Women's Japan Basketball League. She has represented Japan in international competitions at both youth and senior levels, including the FIBA Under-17 World Championship for Women, the FIBA Asia Under-18 Championship for Women and the 2026 Asian Games.

== Early life and education ==
Akagi was born on 4 August 1998 in Ōita Prefecture, Japan. She attended Hōfu Elementary School, Hetsugi Junior High School and Ōka Gakuen High School before studying at Tokyo Healthcare University. She subsequently joined Fujitsu Red Wave, continuing her basketball career in the Women's Japan Basketball League.

== Career ==
Akagi developed her basketball career through school and university competitions in Japan. During her youth career, she represented Japan at the 2014 FIBA Under-17 World Championship for Women, where the national team finished seventh. She later competed at the 2016 FIBA Asia Under-18 Championship for Women, helping Japan finish as runners-up.

Akagi joined Fujitsu Red Wave in 2021 after playing for Tokyo Healthcare University. She plays in the guard position and wears number 9 for the club. In an interview published by Fujitsu in June 2021, she discussed her intention to attack the paint and use her scoring ability to contribute to the team.

With Fujitsu, Akagi has competed in domestic league play and international club tournaments. She appeared for the team in the 2024 and 2025 editions of the FIBA Women's Basketball League Asia. Fujitsu reached the final of the 2025 competition and finished as runner-up.

In 2025, Akagi participated in Japan's senior national-team programme, including the Mitsui Fudosan Cup. She was subsequently selected for Japan's women's basketball team at the 2026 Asian Games in Aichi and Nagoya. Japan won the silver medal after losing 75–70 to South Korea in the final.
