= Miyu Okamoto =

Japanese basketball player

Toyota Antelopes
- Position: Power forward
- League: W League

Personal information
- Born: April 23, 2001 (age 25) Hokkaido, Japan
- Listed height: 1.79 m (5 ft 10 in)

Career information
- College: Tokyo Healthcare University
- Playing career: 2024–present

Career history
- 2024–present: Toyota Antelopes
Medals
Representing Japan
Women's basketball
Asian Games
Silver medal – second place	2026 Aichi–Nagoya	Team
Summer World University Games
Silver medal – second place	2023 Chengdu	Team

Miyu Okamoto (Japanese: 岡本 美優, born 23 April 2001) is a Japanese basketball player who plays as a power forward for the Toyota Antelopes in the W League. She previously played for Tokyo Healthcare University and Sakuragaoka High School. Okamoto has represented Japan in international basketball, winning silver medals at the 2023 Summer World University Games and the 2026 Asian Games.

== Career ==
Okamoto was born in Hokkaido, Japan, on 23 April 2001. She began playing basketball as a child and attended Sakuragaoka High School, where she developed into a frontcourt player. In 2019, she helped Sakuragaoka win the girls' title at the All Japan High School Basketball Championship, commonly known as the Winter Cup. She was also selected for the tournament's Best Five, recognising her performances during the championship.

Okamoto went on to study at Tokyo Healthcare University, where she continued playing competitive basketball. She was part of the university's women's team during its participation in national university competitions. In the 2023 Kanto Women's Basketball League, she ranked among the leading scorers, finishing with 195 points in the league's scoring list. She also played in the All Japan Intercollegiate Basketball Championship, where Tokyo Healthcare University competed among Japan's leading university teams.

During her university career, Okamoto was selected to represent Japan at the 2023 Summer World University Games in Chengdu, China. Japan's women's basketball team won the silver medal. In the semi-final against Finland, Okamoto scored 20 points, including five three-point shots, helping Japan secure a place in the final. She later represented Japan at the 2025 Summer World University Games.

After graduating from Tokyo Healthcare University in 2024, Okamoto joined the Toyota Antelopes, a professional team in Japan's W League. She plays as a power forward and is listed at 179 cm tall. Her club profile identifies her previous teams and schools, including her youth basketball experience in Hokkaido, Sakuragaoka High School and Tokyo Healthcare University.

In 2026, Okamoto was selected for Japan's women's national team for the Aichi–Nagoya Asian Games. Japan advanced to the women's basketball final and won the silver medal after losing 75–70 to South Korea. The Japanese Olympic Committee recorded Okamoto's final result as second place in the women's competition. The Japan Basketball Association also published her comments following the tournament, in which she thanked supporters for their encouragement throughout the national team's campaign.
