= Mona Tateyama =

Japanese basketball player

No. 19 – Hitachi High-Tech Cougars
- Position: Small forward
- League: Women's Japan Basketball League

Personal information
- Born: November 6, 2002 (age 24) Hokkaido, Japan
- Listed height: 178 cm (5 ft 10 in)

Career information
- College: Hakuoh University

Career history
- 2025–: Hitachi High-Tech Cougars
Medals
Women's basketball
Representing Japan
Asian Games
Silver medal – second place	2026 Aichi–Nagoya	Team
Summer Universiade
Silver medal – second place	2021 Chengdu	Team

Mona Tateyama (Japanese: 舘山 萌菜; born 6 November 2002) is a Japanese basketball player who plays as a small forward for the Hitachi High-Tech Cougars in the Women's Japan Basketball League. She has represented Japan in international competition, including at the FIBA Under-19 Women's Basketball World Cup and the 2026 Asian Games, where she won a silver medal.

== Career ==
Tateyama was born on 6 November 2002 in Hokkaido, Japan. She attended Sapporo Yamanote High School before studying at Hakuoh University, where she played university basketball.

In 2021, Tateyama represented Japan at the FIBA Under-19 Women's Basketball World Cup in Debrecen, Hungary. She played in all seven of Japan's games, averaging 7 points and 4.1 rebounds per game as the team finished ninth.

Tateyama joined the Hitachi High-Tech Cougars in 2025. During the 2025–26 WJBL season, she averaged 10.46 points, 3.88 rebounds and 2.46 assists per game in the regular season. She received the Rookie of the Year award, was named to the W League Future's Best Five, and won the league's free-throw percentage award.

Tateyama was selected for Japan's senior women's national team and competed at the 2026 Asian Games in Aichi and Nagoya. Japan finished second in the women's basketball tournament, earning the silver medal. Tateyama appeared in six games and averaged 10.8 points and 4.3 rebounds per game during the tournament.
