= Shooting at the 2006 Asian Games – Men's skeet =

Men's skeet at the 2006 Asian Games
- Venue: Lusail Shooting Range
- Dates: 7–8 December 2006
- Competitors: 39 from 16 nations

Medalists
gold medal	Salah Al-Mutairi	Kuwait
silver medal	Saeed Al-Maktoum	United Arab Emirates
bronze medal	Jin Di	China

The men's skeet competition at the 2006 Asian Games in Doha, Qatar was held on 7 and 8 December at the Lusail Shooting Range.

== Schedule ==
All times are Arabia Standard Time (UTC+03:00)

Date	Time	Event
Thursday, 7 December 2006	08:30	Qualification day 1
Friday, 8 December 2006	08:30	Qualification day 2
Friday, 8 December 2006	15:00	Final

== Records ==
Prior to this competition, the existing world, Asian and Games records were as follows.

Qualification
World Record	Vincent Hancock (USA)	124	Changwon, South Korea	16 April 2005
Asian Record	Jin Di (CHN); Qu Ridong (CHN)	124	Qingyuan, China	10 April 2006
Games Record	—	—	—	—
Final
World Record	Vincent Hancock (USA)	149	Changwon, South Korea	16 April 2005
Asian Record	Qu Ridong (CHN); Sergey Yakshin (KAZ)	148	Qingyuan, China	10 April 2006
Games Record	—	—	—	—

== Results ==
=== Qualification ===
Rank	Athlete	Day 1			Day 2		Total	S-off	Notes
Rank	Athlete	1	2	3	4	5	Total	S-off	Notes
1	Saeed Al-Maktoum (UAE)	24	25	24	25	25	123		GR
2	Salah Al-Mutairi (KUW)	24	25	25	24	25	123		GR
3	Sergey Yakshin (KAZ)	24	24	24	25	25	122		
4	Vladislav Mukhamediyev (KAZ)	24	25	25	24	24	122		
5	Qu Ridong (CHN)	25	25	25	24	23	122		
6	Jin Di (CHN)	25	23	25	25	23	121	+5	
7	Amin Karamat (PAK)	25	23	24	24	25	121	+4	
8	Saif Bin Futtais (UAE)	24	23	24	25	24	120		
9	Nasser Al-Attiyah (QAT)	23	25	25	23	24	120		
10	Hwang Jung-soo (KOR)	22	25	24	24	24	119		
11	Zaid Al-Mutairi (KUW)	23	24	25	24	23	119		
12	Abdullah Al-Rashidi (KUW)	23	24	24	24	23	118		
13	Kenji Orihara (JPN)	22	23	24	23	25	117		
14	Masoud Saleh Al-Athba (QAT)	24	24	22	22	25	117		
15	Majed Al-Tamimi (KSA)	22	23	25	23	24	117		
16	Mohamed Al-Mannai (QAT)	23	23	24	23	24	117		
17	Sergey Kolos (KAZ)	21	24	24	25	23	117		
18	Li Xu (CHN)	22	23	24	25	23	117		
19	Hiromitsu Aoki (JPN)	24	23	24	25	21	117		
20	Saeed Al-Mutairi (KSA)	24	23	24	22	23	116		
21	Roger Dahi (SYR)	24	23	24	24	21	116		
22	Cho Yong-seong (KOR)	20	23	22	25	25	115		
23	Cho Kwang-soo (KOR)	22	21	24	25	23	115		
24	Khurram Inam (PAK)	22	23	22	25	23	115		
25	Ziad Richa (LIB)	22	22	24	22	24	114		
26	Mohamed Hussain Ahmed (UAE)	22	23	23	24	22	114		
27	Isao Tamabuchi (JPN)	24	20	23	24	22	113		
28	Mairaj Ahmad Khan (IND)	22	24	23	19	24	112		
29	Man Singh (IND)	21	23	20	25	23	112		
30	Patricio Bernardo (PHI)	20	21	22	23	25	111		
31	Chen Te-wei (TPE)	22	22	20	22	25	111		
32	Allan Daniel Peoples (IND)	21	23	23	22	21	110		
33	Ricky Teh (MAS)	19	20	22	25	23	109		
34	Paul Brian Rosario (PHI)	21	21	22	23	22	109		
35	Raja Muhammad Shafiq (PAK)	19	24	23	21	22	109		
36	Wasim Karboutly (SYR)	21	22	19	20	24	106		
37	Alexis Hizon (PHI)	22	18	19	24	23	106		
38	Bader Al-Zahli (OMA)	22	18	21	19	21	101		
39	Abdulaziz Al-Hamlan (KSA)	20	20	19	22	17	98		

=== Final ===
Rank	Athlete	Qual.	Final	Total	S-off	Notes
1st place, gold medalist(s)	Salah Al-Mutairi (KUW)	123	24	147	+4	GR
2nd place, silver medalist(s)	Saeed Al-Maktoum (UAE)	123	24	147	+3	GR
3rd place, bronze medalist(s)	Jin Di (CHN)	121	25	146		
4	Qu Ridong (CHN)	122	23	145		
5	Sergey Yakshin (KAZ)	122	22	144	+4	
6	Vladislav Mukhamediyev (KAZ)	122	22	144	+3	
