= Shooting at the 2006 Asian Games – Men's skeet team =

Men's skeet team at the 2006 Asian Games
- Venue: Lusail Shooting Range
- Dates: 7–8 December 2006
- Competitors: 33 from 11 nations

Medalists
| gold medal | Kazakhstan; Sergey Kolos, Vladislav Mukhamediyev, Sergey Yakshin |
| silver medal | Kuwait; Salah Al-Mutairi, Zaid Al-Mutairi, Abdullah Al-Rashidi |
| bronze medal | China; Jin Di, Li Xu, Qu Ridong |

The men's skeet team competition at the 2006 Asian Games in Doha, Qatar was held on 7 and 8 December at the Lusail Shooting Range.

== Schedule ==
All times are Arabia Standard Time (UTC+03:00)

| Date | Time | Event |
|---|---|---|
| Thursday, 7 December 2006 | 08:30 | Day 1 |
| Friday, 8 December 2006 | 08:30 | Day 2 |

== Records ==
Prior to this competition, the existing world, Asian and Games records were as follows.

| World Record | Italy | 365 | Zagreb, Croatia | 3 August 2006 |
| Asian Record | Kuwait | 355 | Zagreb, Croatia | 3 August 2006 |
| Games Record | — | — | — | — |

== Results ==
| Rank | Team | Day 1 | | | Day 2 | | Total | Notes |
| Rank | Team | 1 | 2 | 3 | 4 | 5 | Total | Notes |
|---|---|---|---|---|---|---|---|---|
| 1st place, gold medalist(s) | Kazakhstan (KAZ) | 69 | 73 | 73 | 74 | 72 | 361 | AR |
| | Sergey Kolos | 21 | 24 | 24 | 25 | 23 | 117 | |
| | Vladislav Mukhamediyev | 24 | 25 | 25 | 24 | 24 | 122 | |
| | Sergey Yakshin | 24 | 24 | 24 | 25 | 25 | 122 | |
| 2nd place, silver medalist(s) | Kuwait (KUW) | 70 | 73 | 74 | 72 | 71 | 360 | |
| | Salah Al-Mutairi | 24 | 25 | 25 | 24 | 25 | 123 | |
| | Zaid Al-Mutairi | 23 | 24 | 25 | 24 | 23 | 119 | |
| | Abdullah Al-Rashidi | 23 | 24 | 24 | 24 | 23 | 118 | |
| 3rd place, bronze medalist(s) | China (CHN) | 72 | 71 | 74 | 74 | 69 | 360 | |
| | Jin Di | 25 | 23 | 25 | 25 | 23 | 121 | |
| | Li Xu | 22 | 23 | 24 | 25 | 23 | 117 | |
| | Qu Ridong | 25 | 25 | 25 | 24 | 23 | 122 | |
| 4 | United Arab Emirates (UAE) | 70 | 71 | 71 | 74 | 71 | 357 | |
| | Mohamed Hussain Ahmed | 22 | 23 | 23 | 24 | 22 | 114 | |
| | Saeed Al-Maktoum | 24 | 25 | 24 | 25 | 25 | 123 | |
| | Saif Bin Futtais | 24 | 23 | 24 | 25 | 24 | 120 | |
| 5 | Qatar (QAT) | 70 | 72 | 71 | 68 | 73 | 354 | |
| | Masoud Saleh Al-Athba | 24 | 24 | 22 | 22 | 25 | 117 | |
| | Nasser Al-Attiyah | 23 | 25 | 25 | 23 | 24 | 120 | |
| | Mohamed Al-Mannai | 23 | 23 | 24 | 23 | 24 | 117 | |
| 6 | South Korea (KOR) | 64 | 69 | 70 | 74 | 72 | 349 | |
| | Cho Kwang-soo | 22 | 21 | 24 | 25 | 23 | 115 | |
| | Cho Yong-seong | 20 | 23 | 22 | 25 | 25 | 115 | |
| | Hwang Jung-soo | 22 | 25 | 24 | 24 | 24 | 119 | |
| 7 | Japan (JPN) | 70 | 66 | 71 | 72 | 68 | 347 | |
| | Hiromitsu Aoki | 24 | 23 | 24 | 25 | 21 | 117 | |
| | Kenji Orihara | 22 | 23 | 24 | 23 | 25 | 117 | |
| | Isao Tamabuchi | 24 | 20 | 23 | 24 | 22 | 113 | |
| 8 | Pakistan (PAK) | 66 | 70 | 69 | 70 | 70 | 345 | |
| | Khurram Inam | 22 | 23 | 22 | 25 | 23 | 115 | |
| | Amin Karamat | 25 | 23 | 24 | 24 | 25 | 121 | |
| | Raja Muhammad Shafiq | 19 | 24 | 23 | 21 | 22 | 109 | |
| 9 | India (IND) | 64 | 70 | 66 | 66 | 68 | 334 | |
| | Mairaj Ahmad Khan | 22 | 24 | 23 | 19 | 24 | 112 | |
| | Allan Daniel Peoples | 21 | 23 | 23 | 22 | 21 | 110 | |
| | Man Singh | 21 | 23 | 20 | 25 | 23 | 112 | |
| 10 | Saudi Arabia (KSA) | 66 | 66 | 68 | 67 | 64 | 331 | |
| | Abdulaziz Al-Hamlan | 20 | 20 | 19 | 22 | 17 | 98 | |
| | Saeed Al-Mutairi | 24 | 23 | 24 | 22 | 23 | 116 | |
| | Majed Al-Tamimi | 22 | 23 | 25 | 23 | 24 | 117 | |
| 11 | Philippines (PHI) | 63 | 60 | 63 | 70 | 70 | 326 | |
| | Patricio Bernardo | 20 | 21 | 22 | 23 | 25 | 111 | |
| | Alexis Hizon | 22 | 18 | 19 | 24 | 23 | 106 | |
| | Paul Brian Rosario | 21 | 21 | 22 | 23 | 22 | 109 | |
