= Shooting at the 2002 Asian Games – Men's skeet =

Men's skeet at the 2002 Asian Games
- Venue: Changwon International Shooting Range
- Dates: 7–8 October 2002
- Competitors: 33 from 13 nations

Medalists
gold medal	Masoud Saleh Al-Athba	Qatar
silver medal	Jin Di	China
bronze medal	Alexey Ponomarev	Kazakhstan

The men's skeet competition at the 2002 Asian Games in Busan, South Korea was held on 7 and 8 October at the Changwon International Shooting Range.

== Schedule ==
All times are Korea Standard Time (UTC+09:00)

Date	Time	Event
Monday, 7 October 2002	09:30	Qualification day 1
Tuesday, 8 October 2002	09:30	Qualification day 2
Tuesday, 8 October 2002	15:00	Final

== Records ==
Prior to this competition, the existing world, Asian and Games records were as follows.

Qualification
World Record	Jan-Henrik Heinrich (GER)	125	Lonato, Italy	5 June 1996
Asian Record	Abdullah Al-Rashidi (KUW)	125	Lima, Peru	15 November 1997
Games Record	Sergey Yakshin (KAZ)	124	Bangkok, Thailand	8 December 1998
Final
World Record	Jan-Henrik Heinrich (GER)	150	Lonato, Italy	5 June 1996
Asian Record	Abdullah Al-Rashidi (KUW)	149	Lima, Peru	15 November 1997
Games Record	Sergey Yakshin (KAZ)	149	Bangkok, Thailand	8 December 1998

== Results ==
=== Qualification ===
Rank	Athlete	Day 1			Day 2		Total	S-off	Notes
Rank	Athlete	1	2	3	4	5	Total	S-off	Notes
1	Masoud Saleh Al-Athba (QAT)	24	24	25	25	24	122		
2	Jin Di (CHN)	24	25	25	25	23	122		
3	Nasser Al-Attiyah (QAT)	24	25	23	24	25	121		
4	Saeed Al-Maktoum (UAE)	25	23	25	22	25	120		
5	Sergey Yakshin (KAZ)	24	25	24	24	22	119	+2	
6	Alexey Ponomarev (KAZ)	25	24	25	23	22	119	+2	
7	Lee Suk-tae (KOR)	23	23	24	24	25	119	+1	
8	Abdullah Al-Mutairi (KUW)	22	23	24	24	25	118		
9	Sin Nam-ho (PRK)	22	23	25	24	24	118		
10	Pak Nam-su (PRK)	23	25	23	21	25	117		
10	Ahmed Al-Kuwari (QAT)	23	24	22	24	24	117		
10	Sergey Kolos (KAZ)	25	23	23	22	24	117		
13	Chen Dong (CHN)	23	23	23	23	24	116		
13	Naser Shafee (KUW)	22	24	23	24	23	116		
13	Kenji Orihara (JPN)	23	23	24	24	22	116		
16	Hwang Jung-soo (KOR)	21	23	24	24	22	114		
16	Zhang Kaiyan (CHN)	24	23	25	20	22	114		
16	Saeed Al-Mutairi (KSA)	23	23	23	24	21	114		
19	Ra Sang-uk (PRK)	23	23	21	23	23	113		
19	Mohamed Hussain Ahmed (UAE)	23	23	21	24	22	113		
19	Richard Cheong (MAS)	23	22	23	23	22	113		
22	Zaid Al-Mutairi (KUW)	22	21	23	22	24	112		
23	Saif Bin Futtais (UAE)	22	24	20	22	22	110		
23	Ahmed Sultan (PAK)	23	23	22	24	18	110		
25	Rahoul Rai (IND)	21	22	23	22	21	109		
25	Jeon Chan-sik (KOR)	22	22	21	22	22	109		
27	Harinder Singh Bedi (IND)	20	22	22	21	22	107		
27	Majed Al-Tamimi (KSA)	22	22	22	21	20	107		
29	Naveen Jindal (IND)	22	23	20	18	20	103		
29	Amin Karamat (PAK)	22	21	21	22	17	103		
31	Khaled Al-Nasri (OMA)	18	21	18	20	17	94		
32	Saoud Al-Abadi (OMA)	18	21	17	18	19	93		
33	Munir Hussain (PAK)	5	9	11	11	11	47		

=== Final ===
Rank	Athlete	Qual.	Final	Total	S-off	Notes
1st place, gold medalist(s)	Masoud Saleh Al-Athba (QAT)	122	24	146		
2nd place, silver medalist(s)	Jin Di (CHN)	122	22	144		
3rd place, bronze medalist(s)	Alexey Ponomarev (KAZ)	119	24	143		
4	Nasser Al-Attiyah (QAT)	121	21	142	+12	
5	Saeed Al-Maktoum (UAE)	120	22	142	+11	
6	Sergey Yakshin (KAZ)	119	23	142	+9	
