= Shooting at the 2010 Asian Games – Men's skeet team =

Men's skeet team at the 2010 Asian Games
- Venue: Guangzhou Shotgun Centre
- Dates: 23–24 November 2010
- Competitors: 33 from 11 nations

Medalists
gold medal	Qatar; Masoud Saleh Al-Athba, Abdulaziz Al-Attiyah, Nasser Al-Attiyah
silver medal	Athletes from Kuwait; Salah Al-Mutairi, Zaid Al-Mutairi, Abdullah Al-Rashidi
bronze medal	China; Jin Di, Qu Ridong, Tang Shuai

The men's skeet team competition at the 2010 Asian Games in Guangzhou, China was held on 23 and 24 November at the Guangzhou Shotgun Centre.

== Schedule ==
All times are China Standard Time (UTC+08:00)

Date	Time	Event
Tuesday, 23 November 2010	09:00	Day 1
Wednesday, 24 November 2010	09:00	Day 2

== Records ==
Prior to this competition, the existing world, Asian and Games records were as follows.

World Record	United States	366	Maribor, Slovenia	16 August 2009
Asian Record	Kazakhstan	361	Doha, Qatar	8 December 2006
Games Record	Kazakhstan	361	Doha, Qatar	8 December 2006

== Results ==
Legend

- DNS — Did not start

Rank	Team	Day 1		Day 2			Total	Notes
Rank	Team	1	2	3	4	5	Total	Notes
1st place, gold medalist(s)	Qatar (QAT)	72	71	73	67	70	353	
	Masoud Saleh Al-Athba	24	24	24	23	25	120	
	Abdulaziz Al-Attiyah	24	24	24	21	21	114	
	Nasser Al-Attiyah	24	23	25	23	24	119	
2nd place, silver medalist(s)	Athletes from Kuwait (IOC)	67	72	70	68	68	345	
	Salah Al-Mutairi	20	25	21	21	21	108	
	Zaid Al-Mutairi	22	24	24	23	23	116	
	Abdullah Al-Rashidi	25	23	25	24	24	121	
3rd place, bronze medalist(s)	China (CHN)	71	68	70	69	67	345	
	Jin Di	24	20	22	24	22	112	
	Qu Ridong	22	24	25	22	23	116	
	Tang Shuai	25	24	23	23	22	117	
4	South Korea (KOR)	68	69	66	71	69	343	
	Cho Kwang-soo	19	24	23	24	23	113	
	Cho Yong-seong	25	21	24	22	24	116	
	Jeon Chan-sik	24	24	19	25	22	114	
5	United Arab Emirates (UAE)	68	66	67	72	67	340	
	Mohamed Hussain Ahmed	23	21	22	23	21	110	
	Saeed Al-Maktoum	21	22	23	25	23	114	
	Saif Bin Futtais	24	23	22	24	23	116	
6	Kazakhstan (KAZ)	72	72	67	65	64	340	
	Sergey Kolos	24	23	23	22	21	113	
	Vladislav Mukhamediyev	24	25	23	23	22	117	
	Sergey Yakshin	24	24	21	20	21	110	
7	India (IND)	70	68	66	63	69	336	
	Mairaj Ahmad Khan	23	23	22	21	24	113	
	Allan Daniel Peoples	23	23	23	21	22	112	
	Smit Singh	24	22	21	21	23	111	
8	Pakistan (PAK)	65	59	68	66	66	324	
	Khurram Inam	21	20	22	23	21	107	
	Amin Karamat	23	18	22	21	22	106	
	Abdul Sattar Satti	21	21	24	22	23	111	
9	Chinese Taipei (TPE)	55	64	65	64	65	313	
	Chang Chien Ming-shan	22	22	22	21	23	110	
	Lee Meng-yuan	12	22	19	20	20	93	
	Tsai I-hsuan	21	20	24	23	22	110	
10	Singapore (SIN)	61	66	62	60	57	306	
	David Chan	19	22	23	20	17	101	
	Eugene Chiew	18	20	19	19	19	95	
	Lee Yee	24	24	20	21	21	110	
—	Saudi Arabia (KSA)						DNS	
	Saeed Al-Mutairi	22	22	22	23	23	112	
	Abdullah Al-Shahrani						DNS	
	Majed Al-Tamimi	22	21	20	23	21	107	
