= Shooting at the 2014 Asian Games – Men's skeet =

Men's skeet at the 2014 Asian Games
- Venue: Gyeonggido Shooting Range
- Dates: 29–30 September 2014
- Competitors: 40 from 16 nations

Medalists
gold medal	Abdullah Al-Rashidi	Kuwait
silver medal	Xu Ying	China
bronze medal	Jin Di	China

The men's skeet competition at the 2014 Asian Games in Incheon, South Korea was held on 29 and 30 September at the Gyeonggido Shooting Range.

== Schedule ==
All times are Korea Standard Time (UTC+09:00)

Date	Time	Event
Monday, 29 September 2014	09:30	Qualification day 1
Tuesday, 30 September 2014	09:30	Qualification day 2
Tuesday, 30 September 2014	14:30	Semifinal
Tuesday, 30 September 2014	14:30	Finals

== Records ==
Prior to this competition, the existing world, Asian and Games records were as follows.

World Record	Valerio Luchini (ITA)	125	Beijing, China	9 July 2014
Asian Record	Vladislav Mukhamediyev (KAZ)	124	Al-Ain, United Arab Emirates	23 April 2013
Games Record	—	—	—	—

== Results ==
Legend

- DNS — Did not start

=== Qualification ===
Rank	Athlete	Day 1			Day 2		Total	S-off	Notes
Rank	Athlete	1	2	3	4	5	Total	S-off	Notes
1	Zhang Fan (CHN)	25	25	25	24	24	123		GR
2	Jin Di (CHN)	24	25	25	24	24	122		
3	Abdullah Al-Rashidi (KUW)	25	24	23	24	25	121		
4	Xu Ying (CHN)	23	25	25	23	25	121		
5	Hwang Jung-soo (KOR)	23	25	24	23	25	120		
6	Mairaj Ahmad Khan (IND)	23	24	25	22	25	119	+4	
7	Vladislav Mukhamediyev (KAZ)	25	22	25	23	24	119	+3	
8	Saud Habib (KUW)	24	25	24	22	23	118		
9	Rashid Saleh Al-Athba (QAT)	23	22	25	23	24	117		
10	Saif Bin Futtais (UAE)	25	24	21	23	23	116		
11	Cho Min-ki (KOR)	23	23	25	22	23	116		
12	Nasser Al-Attiyah (QAT)	22	22	23	24	24	115		
13	Mohamed Hussain Ahmed (UAE)	24	22	22	24	23	115		
14	Usman Chand (PAK)	23	24	21	24	23	115		
15	Lee Jong-jun (KOR)	23	25	22	22	23	115		
16	Tsai I-hsuan (TPE)	23	23	25	22	22	115		
17	Alexandr Yechshenko (KAZ)	23	25	23	23	21	115		
18	Salah Al-Mutairi (KUW)	21	23	22	24	24	114		
19	Saeed Al-Mutairi (KSA)	23	21	22	24	24	114		
20	Vitaliy Kulikov (KAZ)	23	21	23	25	22	114		
21	Chang Chien Ming-shan (TPE)	25	22	23	23	21	114		
22	Masoud Saleh Al-Athba (QAT)	22	22	25	22	22	113		
23	Khurram Inam (PAK)	23	23	21	23	22	112		
24	Parampal Singh Guron (IND)	24	20	22	22	22	110		
25	Saeed Al-Dhraif (UAE)	24	21	21	23	21	110		
26	Arozepal Sandhu (IND)	18	21	24	21	25	109		
27	Hasan Majed Mohamed (BRN)	21	22	22	22	22	109		
28	Nooruddin Salim (BAN)	22	21	21	23	21	108		
29	Chang Chia-hao (TPE)	19	21	22	22	23	107		
30	Iqbal Islam (BAN)	20	20	22	22	21	105		
31	Yasir Al-Nasseri (OMA)	20	22	22	21	20	105		
32	Eugene Chiew (SIN)	18	20	23	20	21	102		
33	Bekzod Abdurakhimov (UZB)	21	20	20	22	18	101		
34	Low Jiang Hao (SIN)	19	16	23	20	22	100		
35	Salimkhon Abzalkhanov (UZB)	19	18	23	17	22	99		
36	Abdullah Al-Shahrani (KSA)	17	19	19	23	18	96		
37	Ruslan Utaganov (UZB)	19	16	18	19	22	94		
38	Sabbir Hasan (BAN)	16	20	21	17	17	91		
39	Bat-Ölziin Gan-Erdene (MGL)	18	17	22	16	16	89		
—	Majed Al-Tamimi (KSA)						DNS		

=== Semifinal ===
Rank	Athlete	Score	S-off
1	Abdullah Al-Rashidi (KUW)	15	
1	Xu Ying (CHN)	15	
3	Zhang Fan (CHN)	14	
4	Jin Di (CHN)	13	
5	Mairaj Ahmad Khan (IND)	11	
6	Hwang Jung-soo (KOR)	11	

=== Finals ===
==== Bronze medal match ====
Rank	Athlete	Score	S-off
3rd place, bronze medalist(s)	Jin Di (CHN)	15	
4	Zhang Fan (CHN)	13	

==== Gold medal match ====
Rank	Athlete	Score	S-off
1st place, gold medalist(s)	Abdullah Al-Rashidi (KUW)	16	
2nd place, silver medalist(s)	Xu Ying (CHN)	12	
