= Shooting at the 2022 Asian Games – Men's skeet =

Men's skeet at the 2022 Asian Games
- Venue: Fuyang Yinhu Sports Centre
- Dates: 26–27 September 2023
- Competitors: 39 from 18 nations

Medalists
gold medal	Abdullah Al-Rashidi	Kuwait
silver medal	Anantjeet Singh Naruka	India
bronze medal	Nasser Al-Attiyah	Qatar

The men's skeet competition at the 2022 Asian Games in Hangzhou, China was held on 26 and 27 September 2023 at Fuyang Yinhu Sports Centre.

== Schedule ==
All times are China Standard Time (UTC+08:00)

Date	Time	Event
Tuesday, 26 September 2023	09:00	Qualification day 1
Wednesday, 27 September 2023	09:00	Qualification day 2
Wednesday, 27 September 2023	15:30	Final

== Records ==
Prior to this competition, the existing world, Asian and Games records were as follows.

Qualification
World Record	Valerio Luchini (ITA)	125	Beijing, China	9 July 2014
Asian Record	Vladislav Mukhamediyev (KAZ)	124	Al-Ain, United Arab Emirates	23 April 2013
Games Record	Vladislav Mukhamediyev (KAZ)	124	Palembang, Indonesia	26 August 2018
Final
World Record	Angad Vir Singh Bajwa (IND)	60	Kuwait City, Kuwait	6 November 2018
Asian Record	Angad Vir Singh Bajwa (IND)	60	Kuwait City, Kuwait	6 November 2018
Games Record	Jin Di (CHN); Mansour Al-Rashidi (KUW)	52	Palembang, Indonesia	26 August 2018

== Results ==
Legend

- DNS — Did not start

=== Qualification ===
Rank	Athlete	Day 1			Day 2		Total	S-off	Notes
Rank	Athlete	1	2	3	4	5	Total	S-off	Notes
1	Wu Yunxuan (CHN)	25	24	25	25	25	124		
2	Lee Meng-yuan (TPE)	25	25	24	25	24	123		
3	Nasser Al-Attiyah (QAT)	25	25	24	24	24	122		
4	Anantjeet Singh Naruka (IND)	25	25	23	24	24	121		
5	Liu Jiangchi (CHN)	24	25	24	23	24	120	+10	
6	Abdullah Al-Rashidi (KUW)	24	24	23	24	25	120	+9	
7	Masoud Saleh Al-Athba (QAT)	24	24	24	23	24	119		
8	Alexandr Yechshenko (KAZ)	25	25	22	23	24	119		
9	David Pochivalov (KAZ)	22	25	24	23	24	118		
10	Cho Min-ki (KOR)	25	24	24	21	24	118		
11	Eduard Yechshenko (KAZ)	25	23	23	24	23	118		
12	Usman Chand (PAK)	24	24	24	23	23	118		
13	Han Xu (CHN)	25	23	25	23	22	118		
14	Rashid Saleh Al-Athba (QAT)	25	23	24	25	21	118		
15	Cho Yong-seong (KOR)	24	24	25	24	21	118		
16	Gurjoat Siingh Khangura (IND)	22	22	23	25	25	117		
17	Angad Vir Singh Bajwa (IND)	22	23	24	23	25	117		
18	Kim Min-su (KOR)	24	24	22	24	23	117		
19	Mansour Al-Rashidi (KUW)	22	24	23	23	24	116		
20	Shotaro Toguchi (JPN)	23	23	25	21	24	116		
21	Hatim Al-Shammari (KSA)	25	23	22	25	21	116		
22	Ahmad Usman Sadiq (PAK)	23	24	23	22	22	114		
23	Tanapat Jangpanich (THA)	25	23	22	23	21	114		
24	Pitipoom Phasee (THA)	20	22	24	23	24	113		
25	Saeed Al-Mutairi (KSA)	24	21	23	22	23	113		
26	Abdulaziz Al-Saad (KUW)	21	22	24	24	22	113		
27	Tammar Al-Watt (BRN)	22	22	24	24	21	113		
28	Saud Al-Saud (KSA)	21	22	21	25	23	112		
29	Joseph Lee (MAS)	23	22	23	21	23	112		
30	Saif Bin Futtais (UAE)	21	22	24	23	22	112		
31	Samer Sarkis (LBN)	21	24	22	23	22	112		
32	Low Jiang Hao (SGP)	20	23	23	22	21	109		
33	Al-Sharif Al-Ghaleb (JOR)	22	23	23	20	21	109		
34	Mohammad Al-Qasem (JOR)	21	23	21	21	20	106		
35	Imam Haroon (PAK)	23	24	18	22	18	105		
36	Enrique Enriquez (PHI)	21	19	22	20	22	104		
37	Paul Brian Rosario (PHI)	20	23	21	18	22	104		
38	Jake Ancheta (PHI)	19	20	19	20	21	99		
—	Hasan Majed Mohamed (BRN)						DNS		

=== Final ===
Rank	Athlete	Elimination						S-off	Notes
Rank	Athlete	1	2	3	4	5	6	S-off	Notes
1st place, gold medalist(s)	Abdullah Al-Rashidi (KUW)	10	20	30	40	50	60		GR
2nd place, silver medalist(s)	Anantjeet Singh Naruka (IND)	10	20	30	40	48	58		
3rd place, bronze medalist(s)	Nasser Al-Attiyah (QAT)	9	19	29	38	46			
4	Wu Yunxuan (CHN)	8	18	26	35				
5	Lee Meng-yuan (TPE)	8	18	25					
6	Liu Jiangchi (CHN)	10	18						
