= Shooting at the 2002 Asian Games – Men's skeet team =

Men's skeet team at the 2002 Asian Games
- Venue: Changwon International Shooting Range
- Dates: 7–8 October 2002
- Competitors: 27 from 9 nations

Medalists
gold medal	Qatar; Masoud Saleh Al-Athba, Nasser Al-Attiyah, Ahmed Al-Kuwari
silver medal	Kazakhstan; Sergey Kolos, Alexey Ponomarev, Sergey Yakshin
bronze medal	China; Chen Dong, Jin Di, Zhang Kaiyan

The men's skeet team competition at the 2002 Asian Games in Busan, South Korea was held on 7 and 8 October at the Changwon International Shooting Range.

== Schedule ==
All times are Korea Standard Time (UTC+09:00)

Date	Time	Event
Monday, 7 October 2002	09:30	Day 1
Tuesday, 8 October 2002	09:30	Day 2

== Records ==
Prior to this competition, the existing world, Asian and Games records were as follows.

World Record	Italy	368	Tampere, Finland	7 July 1999
Asian Record	Kuwait	359	Tampere, Finland	7 July 1999
Games Record	Kazakhstan	356	Hiroshima, Japan	8 October 1994

== Results ==
Rank	Team	Day 1			Day 2		Total	Notes
Rank	Team	1	2	3	4	5	Total	Notes
1st place, gold medalist(s)	Qatar (QAT)	71	73	70	73	73	360	
	Masoud Saleh Al-Athba	24	24	25	25	24	122	
	Nasser Al-Attiyah	24	25	23	24	25	121	
	Ahmed Al-Kuwari	23	24	22	24	24	117	
2nd place, silver medalist(s)	Kazakhstan (KAZ)	74	72	72	69	68	355	
	Sergey Kolos	25	23	23	22	24	117	
	Alexey Ponomarev	25	24	25	23	22	119	
	Sergey Yakshin	24	25	24	24	22	119	
3rd place, bronze medalist(s)	China (CHN)	71	71	73	68	69	352	
	Chen Dong	23	23	23	23	24	116	
	Jin Di	24	25	25	25	23	122	
	Zhang Kaiyan	24	23	25	20	22	114	
4	North Korea (PRK)	68	71	69	68	72	348	
	Pak Nam-su	23	25	23	21	25	117	
	Ra Sang-uk	23	23	21	23	23	113	
	Sin Nam-ho	22	23	25	24	24	118	
5	Kuwait (KUW)	66	68	70	70	72	346	
	Abdullah Al-Mutairi	22	23	24	24	25	118	
	Zaid Al-Mutairi	22	21	23	22	24	112	
	Naser Shafee	22	24	23	24	23	116	
6	United Arab Emirates (UAE)	70	70	66	68	69	343	
	Mohamed Hussain Ahmed	23	23	21	24	22	113	
	Saeed Al-Maktoum	25	23	25	22	25	120	
	Saif Bin Futtais	22	24	20	22	22	110	
7	South Korea (KOR)	66	68	69	70	69	342	
	Hwang Jung-soo	21	23	24	24	22	114	
	Jeon Chan-sik	22	22	21	22	22	109	
	Lee Suk-tae	23	23	24	24	25	119	
8	India (IND)	63	67	65	61	63	319	
	Harinder Singh Bedi	20	22	22	21	22	107	
	Naveen Jindal	22	23	20	18	20	103	
	Rahoul Rai	21	22	23	22	21	109	
9	Pakistan (PAK)	50	53	54	57	46	260	
	Munir Hussain	5	9	11	11	11	47	
	Amin Karamat	22	21	21	22	17	103	
	Ahmed Sultan	23	23	22	24	18	110	
