= Shooting at the 2018 Asian Games – Men's skeet =

Men's skeet at the 2018 Asian Games
- Venue: Jakabaring Shooting Range
- Dates: 25–26 August 2018
- Competitors: 30 from 17 nations

Medalists
| gold medal | Mansour Al-Rashidi | Kuwait |
| silver medal | Jin Di | China |
| bronze medal | Saif Bin Futtais | United Arab Emirates |

The men's skeet event at the 2018 Asian Games in Palembang, Indonesia took place on 25–26 August at the Jakabaring International Shooting Range.

== Schedule ==
All times are Western Indonesia Time (UTC+07:00)

| Date | Time | Event |
|---|---|---|
| Saturday, 25 August 2018 | 08:30 | Qualification day 1 |
| Sunday, 26 August 2018 | 09:00 | Qualification day 2 |
| Sunday, 26 August 2018 | 16:00 | Final |

== Records ==
Prior to this competition, the existing world, Asian and Games records were as follows.

Qualification
| World Record | Valerio Luchini (ITA) | 125 | Beijing, China | 9 July 2014 |
| Asian Record | Vladislav Mukhamediyev (KAZ) | 124 | Al-Ain, United Arab Emirates | 23 April 2013 |
| Games Record | Zhang Fan (CHN) | 123 | Incheon, South Korea | 30 September 2014 |
Final
| World Record | Ben Llewellin (GBR); Riccardo Filippelli (ITA) | 59 | New Delhi, India | 26 October 2017 |
| Asian Record | Lee Jong-jun (KOR) | 54 | Tucson, United States | 13 July 2018 |
| Games Record | — | — | — | — |

== Results ==
=== Qualification ===
| Rank | Athlete | Day 1 | | | Day 2 | | Total | S-off | Notes |
| Rank | Athlete | 1 | 2 | 3 | 4 | 5 | Total | S-off | Notes |
|---|---|---|---|---|---|---|---|---|---|
| 1 | Vladislav Mukhamediyev (KAZ) | 25 | 25 | 25 | 24 | 25 | 124 | | GR |
| 2 | Mansour Al-Rashidi (KUW) | 24 | 24 | 25 | 25 | 25 | 123 | | |
| 3 | Usman Chand (PAK) | 25 | 25 | 25 | 23 | 24 | 122 | +2 | |
| 4 | Saeed Al-Mutairi (KSA) | 25 | 25 | 24 | 24 | 24 | 122 | +1 | |
| 5 | Jin Di (CHN) | 23 | 24 | 24 | 25 | 25 | 121 | +12 | |
| 6 | Saif Bin Futtais (UAE) | 25 | 23 | 25 | 24 | 24 | 121 | +11 | |
| 7 | Abdullah Al-Rashidi (KUW) | 24 | 24 | 23 | 24 | 24 | 121 | +9 | |
| 8 | Nasser Al-Attiyah (QAT) | 23 | 24 | 25 | 25 | 24 | 121 | +5 | |
| 9 | Jiranunt Hathaichukiat (THA) | 24 | 24 | 25 | 23 | 25 | 121 | +1 | |
| 10 | Alexandr Yechshenko (KAZ) | 22 | 25 | 24 | 24 | 25 | 120 | | |
| 11 | Kenji Orihara (JPN) | 24 | 25 | 23 | 23 | 25 | 120 | | |
| 12 | Mohamed Hussain Ahmed (UAE) | 25 | 23 | 24 | 24 | 24 | 120 | | |
| 13 | Sheeraz Sheikh (IND) | 24 | 23 | 25 | 25 | 23 | 120 | | |
| 14 | Angad Vir Singh Bajwa (IND) | 24 | 25 | 23 | 22 | 25 | 119 | | |
| 15 | Hwang Jung-soo (KOR) | 25 | 25 | 21 | 24 | 24 | 119 | | |
| 16 | Rashid Saleh Al-Athba (QAT) | 25 | 23 | 25 | 24 | 22 | 119 | | |
| 17 | Hasan Majed Mohamed (BRN) | 24 | 22 | 23 | 25 | 24 | 118 | | |
| 18 | Tsai I-hsuan (TPE) | 24 | 24 | 23 | 23 | 24 | 118 | | |
| 19 | Lee Jong-jun (KOR) | 24 | 23 | 24 | 22 | 24 | 117 | | |
| 20 | Yang Jiang (CHN) | 24 | 25 | 22 | 22 | 24 | 117 | | |
| 21 | Ali Dousti (IRI) | 23 | 24 | 22 | 25 | 22 | 116 | | |
| 22 | Lee Meng-yuan (TPE) | 25 | 22 | 21 | 21 | 24 | 113 | | |
| 23 | Abdul Sattar Satti (PAK) | 21 | 20 | 24 | 23 | 24 | 112 | | |
| 24 | Tanapat Jangpanich (THA) | 21 | 23 | 24 | 21 | 22 | 111 | | |
| 25 | Makoto Yokouchi (JPN) | 22 | 20 | 18 | 23 | 24 | 107 | | |
| 26 | Jake Ancheta (PHI) | 20 | 20 | 24 | 20 | 23 | 107 | | |
| 27 | Ramtin Besharati (IRI) | 20 | 23 | 22 | 22 | 20 | 107 | | |
| 28 | Sabbir Hasan (BAN) | 18 | 23 | 17 | 19 | 18 | 95 | | |
| 29 | Anas Muhsinun Joko Santoso (INA) | 17 | 16 | 13 | 17 | 15 | 78 | | |
| 30 | Hilmansyah (INA) | 16 | 17 | 15 | 14 | 14 | 76 | | |

=== Final ===
| Rank | Athlete | Elimination | | | | | | S-off | Notes |
| Rank | Athlete | 1 | 2 | 3 | 4 | 5 | 6 | S-off | Notes |
|---|---|---|---|---|---|---|---|---|---|
| 1st place, gold medalist(s) | Mansour Al-Rashidi (KUW) | 10 | 16 | 25 | 34 | 44 | 52 | +4 | GR |
| 2nd place, silver medalist(s) | Jin Di (CHN) | 9 | 17 | 26 | 35 | 44 | 52 | +3 | GR |
| 3rd place, bronze medalist(s) | Saif Bin Futtais (UAE) | 9 | 17 | 25 | 35 | 43 | | | |
| 4 | Saeed Al-Mutairi (KSA) | 9 | 14 | 24 | 31 | | | | |
| 5 | Usman Chand (PAK) | 7 | 14 | 21 | | | | | |
| 6 | Vladislav Mukhamediyev (KAZ) | 7 | 12 | | | | | | |
