= Shooting at the 2014 Asian Games – Men's skeet team =

Men's skeet team at the 2014 Asian Games
- Venue: Gyeonggido Shooting Range
- Dates: 29–30 September 2014
- Competitors: 33 from 11 nations

Medalists
gold medal	China; Jin Di, Xu Ying, Zhang Fan
silver medal	Kuwait; Salah Al-Mutairi, Abdullah Al-Rashidi, Saud Habib
bronze medal	South Korea; Cho Min-ki, Hwang Jung-soo, Lee Jong-jun

The men's skeet team competition at the 2014 Asian Games in Incheon, South Korea was held on 29 and 30 September at the Gyeonggido Shooting Range.

== Schedule ==
All times are Korea Standard Time (UTC+09:00)

Date	Time	Event
Monday, 29 September 2014	09:30	Day 1
Tuesday, 30 September 2014	09:30	Day 2

== Records ==
Prior to this competition, the existing world, Asian and Games records were as follows.

World Record	Italy	367	Tatárszentgyörgy, Hungary	26 June 2014
Asian Record	Kazakhstan	361	Almaty, Kazakhstan	4 October 2013
Games Record	—	—	—	—

== Results ==
Legend

- DNS — Did not start

Rank	Team	Day 1			Day 2		Total	Notes
Rank	Team	1	2	3	4	5	Total	Notes
1st place, gold medalist(s)	China (CHN)	72	75	75	71	73	366	AR
	Jin Di	24	25	25	24	24	122	
	Xu Ying	23	25	25	23	25	121	
	Zhang Fan	25	25	25	24	24	123	
2nd place, silver medalist(s)	Kuwait (KUW)	70	72	69	70	72	353	
	Salah Al-Mutairi	21	23	22	24	24	114	
	Abdullah Al-Rashidi	25	24	23	24	25	121	
	Saud Habib	24	25	24	22	23	118	
3rd place, bronze medalist(s)	South Korea (KOR)	69	73	71	67	71	351	
	Cho Min-ki	23	23	25	22	23	116	
	Hwang Jung-soo	23	25	24	23	25	120	
	Lee Jong-jun	23	25	22	22	23	115	
4	Kazakhstan (KAZ)	71	68	71	71	67	348	
	Vitaliy Kulikov	23	21	23	25	22	114	
	Vladislav Mukhamediyev	25	22	25	23	24	119	
	Alexandr Yechshenko	23	25	23	23	21	115	
5	Qatar (QAT)	67	66	73	69	70	345	
	Masoud Saleh Al-Athba	22	22	25	22	22	113	
	Rashid Saleh Al-Athba	23	22	25	23	24	117	
	Nasser Al-Attiyah	22	22	23	24	24	115	
6	United Arab Emirates (UAE)	73	67	64	70	67	341	
	Mohamed Hussain Ahmed	24	22	22	24	23	115	
	Saeed Al-Dhraif	24	21	21	23	21	110	
	Saif Bin Futtais	25	24	21	23	23	116	
7	India (IND)	65	65	71	65	72	338	
	Parampal Singh Guron	24	20	22	22	22	110	
	Mairaj Ahmad Khan	23	24	25	22	25	119	
	Arozepal Sandhu	18	21	24	21	25	109	
8	Chinese Taipei (TPE)	67	66	70	67	66	336	
	Chang Chia-hao	19	21	22	22	23	107	
	Chang Chien Ming-shan	25	22	23	23	21	114	
	Tsai I-hsuan	23	23	25	22	22	115	
9	Bangladesh (BAN)	58	61	64	62	59	304	
	Sabbir Hasan	16	20	21	17	17	91	
	Iqbal Islam	20	20	22	22	21	105	
	Nooruddin Salim	22	21	21	23	21	108	
10	Uzbekistan (UZB)	59	54	61	58	62	294	
	Bekzod Abdurakhimov	21	20	20	22	18	101	
	Salimkhon Abzalkhanov	19	18	23	17	22	99	
	Ruslan Utaganov	19	16	18	19	22	94	
—	Saudi Arabia (KSA)						DNS	
	Saeed Al-Mutairi	23	21	22	24	24	114	
	Abdullah Al-Shahrani	17	19	19	23	18	96	
	Majed Al-Tamimi						DNS	
