= Kuwait at the 2006 Asian Games =

- IOC code: KUW
- NOC: Kuwait Olympic Committee

in Doha
- Medals Ranked 17th: Gold 6 Silver 5 Bronze 2 Total 13

Asian Games appearances (overview)
- 1974; 1978; 1982; 1986; 1990; 1994; 1998; 2002; 2006; 2010; 2014; 2018; 2022; 2026

Other related appearances
- Athletes from Kuwait (2010)

Kuwait participated in the 15th Asian Games, officially known as the XV Asiad held in Doha, Qatar from December 1 to December 15, 2006. Kuwait ranked 17th with 6 gold medals in this edition of the Asiad.

== Medalists ==
Medal	Name	Sport	Event	Date
Gold	Naser Al-Meqlad	Shooting	Men's trap	3
Gold	Abdulrahman Al-Faihan; Naser Al-Meqlad; Khaled Al-Mudhaf	Athletics	Men's trap team	3
Gold	Salah Al-Mutairi	Shooting	Men's skeet	8
Gold	Abdullah Al-Otaibi	Karate	Men's kumite 70 kg	13
Gold	Ahmad Munir	Karate	Men's kumite 80 kg	13
Gold	Torki Al-Khalidi; Bader Abbas; Abdulaziz Al-Zoabi; Faisal Al-Mutairi; Saleh Al-Jaimaz; Husain Siwan; Fahad Rabie; Abdullah Al-Theyab; Yousef Al-Fadhli; Ali Al-Haddad; Mahdi Al-Qallaf; Meshal Swailem; Hamad Al-Rashidi; Ali Al-Mithin; Saad Al-Azemi; Ali Murad	Handball	Men	14
Silver	Ali Al-Zinkawi	Athletics	Men's hammer throw	8
Silver	Salah Al-Mutairi; Zaid Al-Mutairi; Abdullah Al-Rashidi	Shooting	Men's skeet team	8
Silver	Saleh Al-Haddad	Athletics	Men's long jump	9
Silver	Mohammad Al-Azemi	Athletics	Men's 800 metres	11
Silver	Ahmad Munir	Karate	Men's kumite +80 kg	13
Bronze	Khaled Al-Mudhaf	Shooting	Men's trap	3
Bronze	Fawzi Al-Shammari	Athletics	Men's 400 metres	10
