= Shooting at the 1998 Asian Games – Men's skeet =

Men's skeet at the 1998 Asian Games
- Venue: Hua Mark Shooting Range
- Dates: 8 December 1998 – 9 December 1998
- Competitors: 35 from 12 nations

Medalists
gold medal	Sergey Yakshin	Kazakhstan
silver medal	Abdullah Al-Rashidi	Kuwait
bronze medal	Li Xu	China

The men's skeet competition at the 1998 Asian Games in Bangkok, Thailand was held on 8 and 9 December at the Hua Mark Shooting Range.

== Schedule ==
All times are Thailand Standard Time (UTC+07:00)

Date	Time	Event
Tuesday, 8 December 1998	09:30	Qualification day 1
Wednesday, 9 December 1998	09:30	Qualification day 2
Wednesday, 9 December 1998	16:00	Final

== Records ==
Prior to this competition, the existing world, Asian and Games records were as follows.

Qualification
World Record	Jan-Henrik Heinrich (GER)	125	Lonato, Italy	5 June 1996
Asian Record	Abdullah Al-Rashidi (KUW)	125	Lima, Peru	15 November 1997
Games Record	Zhang Xindong (CHN)	123	Hiroshima, Japan	October 1994
Final
World Record	Jan-Henrik Heinrich (GER)	150	Lonato, Italy	5 June 1996
Asian Record	Abdullah Al-Rashidi (KUW)	149	Lima, Peru	15 November 1997
Games Record	Saeed Al-Mutairi (KSA)	145	Hiroshima, Japan	October 1994

== Results ==
=== Final ===
Rank	Athlete	Qual.	Final	Total	S-off	Notes
1st place, gold medalist(s)	Sergey Yakshin (KAZ)	124	25	149		GR
2nd place, silver medalist(s)	Abdullah Al-Rashidi (KUW)	121	24	145		
3rd place, bronze medalist(s)	Li Xu (CHN)	121	24	145		
4	Ha Jong-han (KOR)	120	24	144		
5	Tami Al-Rashidi (KUW)	119	24	143		
6	Zhang Xindong (CHN)	119	23	142		
