= Shagun Chowdhary =

Indian sport shooter (born 1983)

Personal information
- Born: Shagun Chowdhary; 26 June 1983 (age 43) Jaipur, Rajasthan, India
- Education: Maharani Gayatri Devi Girls School, Jaipur and graduated from Jesus and Mary College, Delhi University. She is currently employed with ONGC as Chief Manager (Corporate Communications)
- Years active: 1983–present
- Height: 172 cm (5 ft 8 in)
Medal record
Women's shooting
Representing India
Asian Games
Bronze medal – third place	2014 Incheon	Double trap team
Asian Championships
Gold medal – first place	2012 Patiala	Trap team
Gold medal – first place	2014 Al-Ain	Trap team
Silver medal – second place	2011 Kuala Lumpur	Trap team
Silver medal – second place	2012 Patiala	Trap
Silver medal – second place	2013 Almaty	Trap team
Bronze medal – third place	2009 Almaty	Trap team

Shagun Chowdhary (born 26 June 1983) is an Indian shooter from Jaipur, Rajasthan. She did her schooling from Maharani Gayatri Devi Girls School, Jaipur and graduated from Jesus and Mary College, Delhi University. Shagun Chowdhary became the first Indian woman to qualify for the Olympics in clay pigeon shooting. She finished in 20th place in the trap shooting event at the 2012 Summer Olympics taking place in London.

Shagun, a player of ONGC, attributes her success to coach Marcello Dradi and Daniele DiSpigno from Italy and her sports psychologist Vaibhav Agashe. In 2005 Shagun Chowdhary also made a bold move of shifting from double trap to trap. Her father, Sushil Chowdhary, introduced her to Skeet Shooting when she was just 2-years old.

She is the first Indian woman to qualify for the Olympic trap shooting event. In London 2012 with a score of 61 in the qualifying round she stood at the 20th position and was unable to move to the finals. Shagun Chowdhary has been crowned National Champion multiple times. She won the national championship at the women's trap event at the 61st National Shooting Championship on Thursday 16 November 2017.She is an Asian Games Medalist and the current National Games Champion.
