= Naoko Ishihara =

Japanese sports shooter

Personal information
- Born: 22 October 1974 (age 51)
- Height: 157 cm (5 ft 2 in)
- Weight: 64 kg (141 lb)

Sport
- Sport: Sports shooting
Medal record
Women's shooting
Representing Japan
Asian Championships
| Bronze medal – third place | 2014 Al-Ain | Skeet |

Naoko Ishihara (石原 奈央子, Ishihara Naoko; born 22 October 1974) is a Japanese sports shooter from Kanuma. Her father was also a sports shooter. She competed in the women's skeet event at the 2016 Summer Olympics.
