= Mariya Dmitriyenko =

Kazakh sport shooter

Personal information
- Born: 24 March 1988 (age 38) Shymkent, Kazakh SSR, Soviet Union
- Height: 167 cm (5 ft 6 in)
- Weight: 56 kg (123 lb)
Medal record
Women's shooting
Representing Kazakhstan
World Championships
Bronze medal – third place	2023 Baku	Trap mixed team
Asian Games
Bronze medal – third place	2018 Jakarta-Palembang	Double trap
Bronze medal – third place	2022 Hangzhou	Trap
Bronze medal – third place	2022 Hangzhou	Trap team
Asian Championships
Gold medal – first place	2019 Doha	Trap team
Bronze medal – third place	2007 Kuwait City	Trap team
Bronze medal – third place	2023 Changwon	Trap team
Asian Shotgun Championships
Bronze medal – third place	2015 Kuwait City	Trap team
Gold medal – first place	2019 Almaty	Mixed trap team
Gold medal – first place	2024 Kuwait City	Mixed trap team
Silver medal – second place	2014 Al-Ain	Trap
Silver medal – second place	2018 Kuwait City	Trap team
Silver medal – second place	2019 Almaty	Trap team
Silver medal – second place	2022 Almaty	Mixed trap team
Bronze medal – third place	2017 Astana	Trap
Bronze medal – third place	2017 Astana	Trap team
Bronze medal – third place	2022 Almaty	Trap team
Bronze medal – third place	2024 Kuwait City	Trap
Bronze medal – third place	2024 Kuwait City	Trap team

Mariya Dmitriyenko (Russian: Мария Александровна Дмитриенко; Kazakh: Maria Dmitrienko; born 24 March 1988) is a Kazakhstani sports shooter. She competed in the women's trap event at the 2016 Summer Olympics. Dmitriyenko also competed for Kazakhstan at the 2024 Summer Olympics in the women's skeet event.

In March 2012, she won the Amir of Kuwait International Shooting Grand Prix, but at the award ceremony, "O Kazakhstan"—the parody national anthem from the 2006 film Borat, was mistakenly played instead of the State Anthem of the Republic of Kazakhstan. The team complained, and the award ceremony was restaged. The incident resulted from the wrong song being downloaded from the internet.
