= Zhang Donglian =

Chinese sport shooter

Personal information
- Nationality: Chinese
- Born: 11 October 1982 (age 43) Jingdezhen, China

Sport
- Sport: Shooting
Medal record
Women's shooting
Representing China
Asian Championships
Gold medal – first place	2012 Doha	Skeet team
Gold medal – first place	2019 Doha	Skeet team
Silver medal – second place	2019 Doha	Skeet
Asian Shotgun Championships
Gold medal – first place	2013 Almaty	Skeet team
Gold medal – first place	2019 Almaty	Skeet team
Silver medal – second place	2018 Kuwait City	Skeet team

Zhang Donglian is a Chinese sport shooter. She represents China at the 2020 Summer Olympics in Tokyo.
