= Anwer Sultan =

Indian sports shooter (born 1962)

Personal information
- National team: India
- Born: 19 July 1962 (age 63)

Sport
- Sport: Shooting
Medal record
Men's shooting
Representing India
Asian Championships
Silver medal – second place	2009 Almaty	Trap team
Silver medal – second place	2011 Kuala Lumpur	Trap team

Anwer Sultan (born 19 July 1962) is an Indian sport shooter. He competed at the 2000 Summer Olympics in Sydney, in the men's trap.
