= Seema Tomar =

Indian sport shooter

Personal information
- Nationality: Indian
- Citizenship: Indian
- Born: 3 July 1982 (age 43) Johri, Baghpat, Uttar Pradesh, India
- Years active: 2000 – Present

Sport
- Country: India
- Sport: Trap shooter, Shotgun
Medal record
Women's shooting
Representing India
Asian Championships
Gold medal – first place	2014 Al-Ain	Trap
Gold medal – first place	2014 Al-Ain	Trap team
Gold medal – first place	2016 Abu Dhabi	Trap team
Silver medal – second place	2011 Kuala Lumpur	Trap team
Silver medal – second place	2013 Almaty	Trap team
Silver medal – second place	2016 Abu Dhabi	Trap
Bronze medal – third place	2009 Almaty	Trap team

Seema Tomar (born 3 July 1982) is an Indian trap shooter. She is the only Indian woman to win shotgun Silver Medal at the International Shooting Sport Federation (ISSF) World Cup. She was born in Johri village of Uttar Pradesh.

== Early life ==
Tomar was born on 3 July 1982 in Johri, Baghpat district, Uttar Pradesh. She learned shooting at a range set up in her village in 1998. Tomar was initially discouraged by the expectations of the society around her, which expected her to get married and become a housewife. She felt that she could not enter this field unless an elder from her family went into shooting.

Initially, Tomar was afraid to go shooting range without her mother, who encouraged and accompanied her to the range. Tomar's mother, Prakashi Tomar, started shooting and participating in events, soon becoming an award-winning shooter, the second-oldest woman shooter in India, also known as Revolver Dadi. Prakashi and her sister-in-law Chandro Tomar's participation allowed Tomar to enter shooting competitions. Tomar started shooting in 2001 at the 10m range in the village.

Tomar is still a proponent of equality across genders in Indian villages, and has led to many young girls taking up shooting in her hometown.

Tomar has seven siblings. Her sister Rekha is also a shooter. Prakashi also runs a shooting range in the village where many girls come to learn shooting.

== Career ==
Seema Tomar started with shooting the air rifle in 2004, but later switched to the shotgun event. She currently specializes in Trap shooting.

2010 was a milestone in Seema Tomar's career when she won a Silver Medal in 2010 ISSF World Cup.

In 2014, Tomar won two golds at the Asian Shotgun Championships held in the United Arab Emirates in November 2014.

== Medals ==
- Silver Medal- ISSF World Cup held at England (Dorset), 2010 in Trap Event.
- Bronze Medal- Asian Clay Shooting Championships held at Bangkok, 2010 in Trap event (Team).
- Gold Medal- 53rd National Shooting Championships held at Patiala, 2009 in Trap event.
- Silver medal- 53rd National Shooting Championships held at Patiala, 2009 in Double Trap event.
- Bronze Medal- Asian Clay Shooting Championships held at Kazakhstan, 2009 in Trap event (Team).
- Gold medal- 52nd National Shooting Championships held at Jaipur, 2008 in Trap event.
- Gold medal- 51st National Shooting Championships held at Jaipur, 2007 in Trap event.
- Silver medal- Asian Shooting Championships held at Jaipur, 2007 in Double Trap event.
- Gold medal- 50th National Shooting Championships held at Delhi, 2006 in Double Trap event.
- Gold medal- 49th National Shooting Championships held at Hyderabad, 2005 in Double Trap event.
- Silver medal- 48th National Shooting Championships held at Delhi, 2004 in 12 Bore Double Trap event.
- Gold medal- 47th National Shooting Championships held at Hyderabad, 2003 in 12 Bore trap event.

=== Other events ===
- Commonwealth Games held at New Delhi- 2010.
- ISSF World Cup held at England (Dorset) – 2010.
- ISSF World Cup held at Mexico-2010.
- Asian Clay Shooting Championship held at Bangkok – 2010.
- Asian Clay Shooting Championship held at Kazakhstan- 2009.
- 53rd National Shooting Championship held at Patiala- 2009.
- ISSF World Cup held at United States- 2008.
- ISSF World Cup held in China- 2008.
- 52nd National Shooting Championship held at Jaipur- 2008.
- Asian Shooting Championship held at Jaipur- 2007.
- ISSF World Cup held at Slovenia- 2007.
- ISSF World Cup held in Italy- 2007.
- 51st National Shooting Championship held at Jaipur- 2007.
- ISSF World Cup held in Egypt- 2006.
- ISSF World Cup held at United States- 2006.
- ISSF World Cup held in China- 2006.
- 50th National Shooting Championship held at Delhi – 2006.
- 49th National Shooting Championship held at Hyderabad – 2005.
- 48th National Shooting Championship held at Delhi – 2004.
- 47th National Shooting Championship held at Hyderabad – 2003.
