= Rashid Hamad Al-Athba =

Qatari sport shooter (born 1980)

Rashid Al-Athba
Personal information
- Born: August 18, 1980 (age 45)
Medal record
Men's shooting
Representing Qatar
Asian Games
Gold medal – first place	2014 Incheon	Double trap team
Asian Championships
Gold medal – first place	2023 Changwon	Trap team
Bronze medal – third place	2012 Doha	Trap
Bronze medal – third place	2015 Kuwait City	Double trap team
Bronze medal – third place	2019 Doha	Trap team
Asian Shotgun Championships
Gold medal – first place	2011 Kuala Lumpur	Double trap team
Gold medal – first place	2019 Almaty	Double trap team
Silver medal – second place	2009 Almaty	Double trap
Silver medal – second place	2014 Al-Ain	Trap team
Silver medal – second place	2022 Almaty	Trap
Silver medal – second place	2024 Kuwait City	Trap team
Silver medal – second place	2025 Shymkent	Double Trap team
Bronze medal – third place	2005 Bangkok	Double trap
Bronze medal – third place	2006 Singapore	Double trap
Bronze medal – third place	2007 Manila	Double trap
Bronze medal – third place	2009 Jaipur	Double trap
Bronze medal – third place	2009 Almaty	Double trap team
Bronze medal – third place	2011 Kuala Lumpur	Double trap
Islamic Solidarity Games
Bronze medal – third place	2021 Konya	Trap
Arab Games
Silver medal – second place	2011 Doha	Double trap
Bronze medal – third place	2011 Doha	Trap team
West Asian Games
Silver medal – second place	2005 Doha	Double trap team

Rashid Al-Athba (born 18 August 1980) is a Qatari shooter. He competed in the men's double trap at the 2004 Summer Olympics and the trap and double trap events at the 2012 Summer Olympics.
