= Jin Di (sport shooter) =

Chinese sports shooter (born 1978)

Personal information
- Born: 15 December 1978 (age 47)
- Height: 183 cm (6 ft 0 in)
- Weight: 95 kg (209 lb)

Sport
- Sport: Sports shooting
Medal record
Men's shooting
Representing China
World Championships
Silver medal – second place	2003 Nicosia	Skeet team
Bronze medal – third place	2003 Nicosia	Skeet
Bronze medal – third place	2019 Lonato del Garda	Mixed skeet team
Asian Games
Gold medal – first place	2014 Incheon	Skeet team
Silver medal – second place	2002 Busan	Skeet
Silver medal – second place	2018 Jakarta–Palembang	Skeet
Bronze medal – third place	2002 Busan	Skeet team
Bronze medal – third place	2006 Doha	Skeet
Bronze medal – third place	2006 Doha	Skeet team
Bronze medal – third place	2010 Guangzhou	Skeet team
Bronze medal – third place	2014 Incheon	Skeet
Asian Championships
Gold medal – first place	2000 Vigan	Skeet
Gold medal – first place	2015 Kuwait City	Skeet team
Gold medal – first place	2019 Almaty	Skeet
Gold medal – first place	2019 Almaty	Skeet team
Silver medal – second place	2018 Kuwait City	Skeet
Bronze medal – third place	2000 Langkawi	Skeet
Bronze medal – third place	2013 Almaty	Skeet team
Bronze medal – third place	2018 Kuwait City	Skeet team

Jin Di (Chinese: 金迪; pinyin: Jīn Dí; born 15 December 1978 in Shanghai) is a male Chinese sports shooter who competed in Olympic skeet at the 2000 Summer Olympics, the 2004 Summer Olympics and the 2008 Summer Olympics.

Olympic results
Event	2000	2004	2008
Skeet	46th 113	15th 120	7th 118
