= 2018 Asian Shotgun Championships =

- Host city: Kuwait City, Kuwait
- Dates: 2–12 November 2018
- Main venue: Sheikh Sabah Al-Ahmad Olympic Shooting Complex

The 2018 Asian Shotgun Championships were held in Sheikh Sabah Al-Ahmad Olympic Shooting Complex Kuwait City, Kuwait between November 2 and 12, 2018.

== Medal summary ==
=== Men ===
Event	Gold	Silver	Bronze
Trap	Du Yu; China	He Weidong; China	Viktor Khassyanov; Kazakhstan
Trap team	Kuwait; Abdulrahman Al-Faihan; Khaled Al-Mudhaf; Talal Al-Rashidi	China; He Weidong; Du Yu; Zhou Feixiang	Lebanon; Elie Bejjani; Walid El-Najjar; Alain Moussa
Double trap	Saad Al-Mutairi; Kuwait	Ahmad Al-Afasi; Kuwait	Ahmed Al-Hatmi; Oman
Double trap team	Oman; Ammar Al-Hanai; Ahmed Al-Hatmi; Hussein Al-Shuhoumi	Kuwait; Ahmad Al-Afasi; Saad Al-Mutairi; Jarrah Al-Showaier	Kazakhstan; Alexandr Fedorov; Maxim Kolomoyets; Andrey Mogilevskiy
Skeet	Angad Vir Singh Bajwa; India	Jin Di; China	Saeed Al-Maktoum; United Arab Emirates
Skeet team	Kuwait; Abdullah Al-Rashidi; Mansour Al-Rashidi; Saud Habib	United Arab Emirates; Mohamed Hussain Ahmed; Saeed Al-Maktoum; Saif Bin Futtais	China; Jin Di; Yang Jiang; Zhang Fan

=== Women ===
Event	Gold	Silver	Bronze
Trap	Wang Xiaojing; China	Sarah Al-Hawal; Kuwait	Zhang Xinqiu; China
Trap team	China; Deng Weiyun; Wang Xiaojing; Zhang Xinqiu	Kazakhstan; Anastassiya Davydova; Mariya Dmitriyenko; Aizhan Dosmagambetova	Kuwait; Sarah Al-Hawal; Shahad Al-Hawal; Sumaiah Al-Juhail
Skeet	Sutiya Jiewchaloemmit; Thailand	Assem Orynbay; Kazakhstan	Sarah Ghulam Mohammed; Qatar
Skeet team	Thailand; Isarapa Imprasertsuk; Sutiya Jiewchaloemmit; Nutchaya Sutarporn	China; Che Yufei; Wei Meng; Zhang Donglian	Kazakhstan; Angelina Michshuk; Assem Orynbay; Olga Panarina

=== Mixed ===
Event	Gold	Silver	Bronze
Trap team	Chinese Taipei; Shih Jung-hung; Liu Wan-yu	Kuwait; Abdulrahman Al-Faihan; Sarah Al-Hawal	China; Du Yu; Wang Xiaojing

== Medal table ==
Rank	Nation	Gold	Silver	Bronze	Total
1	China	3	4	3	10
2	Kuwait	3	4	1	8
3	Thailand	2	0	0	2
4	Oman	1	0	1	2
5	Chinese Taipei	1	0	0	1
5	India	1	0	0	1
7	Kazakhstan	0	2	3	5
8	United Arab Emirates	0	1	1	2
9	Lebanon	0	0	1	1
9	Qatar	0	0	1	1
Totals (10 entries)		11	11	11	33
