= 2009 Asian Clay Shooting Championships =

International sport shooting competition

- Host city: Almaty, Kazakhstan
- Dates: September 24 – October 3, 2009

The 2009 Asian Clay Shooting Championships were held in Almaty, Kazakhstan between September 24 and October 3, 2009.

== Medal summary ==
=== Men ===
Event	Gold	Silver	Bronze
Trap	Manavjit Singh Sandhu; India	Khaled Al-Mudhaf; Kuwait	Mansher Singh; India
Trap team	Kuwait; Khaled Al-Mudhaf; Naser Al-Meqlad; Abdulrahman Al-Faihan	India; Manavjit Singh Sandhu; Mansher Singh; Anwer Sultan	China; Tian Anyinan; He Kangtai; Ma Guofu
Double trap	Ronjan Sodhi; India	Rashid Hamad Al-Athba; Qatar	Saif Alshamsy; United Arab Emirates
Double trap team	India; Ronjan Sodhi; Vikram Chopra; Vikram Bhatnagar	United Arab Emirates; Saif Alshamsy; Abdulla Alkendi; Juma Al-Maktoum	Qatar; Rashid Hamad Al-Athba; Hamad Al-Marri; Rashid Al Athbi
Skeet	Abdullah Al-Rashidi; Kuwait	Saeed Al Maktoum; United Arab Emirates	Sergey Yakshin; Kazakhstan
Skeet team	Kazakhstan; Sergey Yakshin; Vladislav Mukhamediyev; Sergey Kolos	Kuwait; Abdullah Al-Rashidi; Zaid Al-Mutairi; Salah Al-Mutairi	United Arab Emirates; Saeed Al Maktoum; Saif Bin Futtais; Mohamed Ahmad

=== Women ===
Event	Gold	Silver	Bronze
Trap	Gao E China	Ray Bassil; Lebanon	Bai Yiting; China
Trap team	China; Gao E Zhu Mei; Bai Yiting	Qatar; Noora Al Ali; Nawal Hassan Al Khalaf; Amna Al Abdulla	India; Shagun Chowdhary; Seema Tomar; Varsha Tomar
Double Trap	Wu Yunxia; China	Zhang Yafei; China	Janejira Srisongkram; Thailand
Skeet	Zhang Shan; China	Arti Singh Rao; India	Guo Wei; China
Skeet team	China; Zhang Shan; Guo Wei; Wang Guangping	Kazakhstan; Elvira Akchurina; Zhaniya Aidarhanova; Anastassiya Molchanova	Thailand; Isarapa Imprasertsuk; Nutchaya Sutarporn; Chalalai Na Sakul

=== Junior ===
Event	Gold	Silver	Bronze
Men's Trap	Mohammed Al-Rumaihi; Qatar	Talal Al-Rashidi; Kuwait	Omar Al-Daihani; Kuwait
Men's Double trap	Sangram Dahiya; India	Xuan Jialin; China	Sun Xuezhi; China
Men's Skeet	Ilya Zabudkin; Kazakhstan	Ali Ahmed Al-Ishaq; Qatar	Fawaz Al-Azemi; Kuwait

== Medal table ==
=== Senior ===
Rank	Nation	Gold	Silver	Bronze	Total
1	China	5	1	3	9
2	India	3	2	2	7
3	Kuwait	2	2	0	4
4	Kazakhstan	1	1	1	3
5	United Arab Emirates	0	2	2	4
6	Qatar	0	2	1	3
7	Lebanon	0	1	0	1
8	Thailand	0	0	2	2
Totals (8 entries)		11	11	11	33

=== Junior ===
Rank	Nation	Gold	Silver	Bronze	Total
1	Qatar	1	1	0	2
2	India	1	0	0	1
2	Kazakhstan	1	0	0	1
4	Kuwait	0	1	2	3
5	China	0	1	1	2
Totals (5 entries)		3	3	3	9
