= 2013 Asian Shotgun Championships =

- Host city: Almaty, Kazakhstan
- Dates: 1–10 October 2013
- Main venue: Asanov Shooting Club

The 2013 Asian Shotgun Championships were held in Almaty, Kazakhstan between October 1 and October 10, 2013 at the Asanov Shooting Club.

== Medal summary ==
=== Men ===
Event	Gold	Silver	Bronze
Trap	Hamad Al-Kendi; United Arab Emirates	Fehaid Al-Deehani; Kuwait	Manavjit Singh Sandhu; India
Trap team	India; Manavjit Singh Sandhu; Zoravar Singh Sandhu; Mansher Singh	Kuwait; Fehaid Al-Deehani; Abdulrahman Al-Faihan; Khaled Al-Mudhaf	United Arab Emirates; Dhaher Al-Aryani; Hamad Al-Kendi; Ahmed Mejren
Double trap	Pan Qiang; China	Hamad Al-Afasi; Kuwait	Wang Hao; China
Double trap team	Kuwait; Ahmad Al-Afasi; Hamad Al-Afasi; Fehaid Al-Deehani	Oman; Mohammed Al-Habsi; Salim Al-Hamidhi; Hussein Al-Shuhoumi	China; Pan Qiang; Wang Hao; Yang Yiyang
Skeet	Saif Bin Futtais; United Arab Emirates	Abdullah Al-Rashidi; Kuwait	Vitaliy Kulikov; Kazakhstan
Skeet team	Kazakhstan; Vitaliy Kulikov; Vladislav Mukhamediyev; Alexandr Yechshenko	Kuwait; Abdullah Al-Rashidi; Zaid Al-Mutairi; Saud Habib	China; Jin Di; Xu Ying; Zhang Fan

=== Women ===
Event	Gold	Silver	Bronze
Trap	Yu Yingping; China	Shahad Al-Hawal; Kuwait	Fatemeh Amiri; Iran
Trap team	China; Wang Yiwen; Yu Yingping; Zhang Dandan	India; Shagun Chowdhary; Shreyasi Singh; Seema Tomar	North Korea; Chae Hye-gyong; Pak Yong-hui; Yang Sol-i
Skeet	Huang Sixue; China	Yu Xiumin; China	Isarapa Imprasertsuk; Thailand
Skeet team	China; Huang Sixue; Yu Xiumin; Zhang Donglian	Kazakhstan; Zhaniya Aidarkhanova; Elvira Akchurina; Angelina Michshuk	Thailand; Isarapa Imprasertsuk; Chalalai Nasakul; Nutchaya Sutarporn

== Medal table ==
Rank	Nation	Gold	Silver	Bronze	Total
1	China	5	1	3	9
2	United Arab Emirates	2	0	1	3
3	Kuwait	1	6	0	7
4	India	1	1	1	3
4	Kazakhstan	1	1	1	3
6	Oman	0	1	0	1
7	Thailand	0	0	2	2
8	Iran	0	0	1	1
8	North Korea	0	0	1	1
Totals (9 entries)		10	10	10	30
