= 2012 Asian Shotgun Championships =

- Host city: Patiala, India
- Dates: 28 November – 9 December 2012
- Main venue: New Moti Bagh Gun Club

The 2012 Asian Shotgun Championships were held at New Moti Bagh Gun Club, Patiala, India between 28 November and 9 December 2012.

== Medal summary ==
=== Men ===
Event	Gold	Silver	Bronze
Trap	Manavjit Singh Sandhu; India	Shigetaka Oyama; Japan	Naser Al-Meqlad; Kuwait
Trap team	India; Manavjit Singh Sandhu; Anirudh Singh; Prithviraj Tondaiman	Kuwait; Fehaid Al-Deehani; Abdulrahman Al-Faihan; Naser Al-Meqlad	Japan; Shigetaka Oyama; Toshiaki Takenaka; Naoyuki Uematsu
Double trap	Juma Al-Maktoum; United Arab Emirates	Fehaid Al-Deehani; Kuwait	Rajyavardhan Singh Rathore; India
Double trap team	United Arab Emirates; Abdulla Al-Kendi; Juma Al-Maktoum; Saif Al-Shamsi	India; Sangram Dahiya; Rajyavardhan Singh Rathore; Ronjan Sodhi	Kuwait; Fehaid Al-Deehani; Saad Al-Mutairi; Jarrah Al-Showaier
Skeet	Abdullah Al-Rashidi; Kuwait	Saif Bin Futtais; United Arab Emirates	Zaid Al-Mutairi; Kuwait
Skeet team	Kuwait; Abdullah Al-Rashidi; Salah Al-Mutairi; Zaid Al-Mutairi	India; Mairaj Ahmad Khan; Man Singh; Smit Singh	Kazakhstan; Vitaliy Kulikov; Sergey Ponomarev; Alexandr Yechshenko

=== Women ===
Event	Gold	Silver	Bronze
Trap	Sarah Al-Hawal; Kuwait	Shagun Chowdhary; India	Sepideh Sirani; Iran
Trap team	India; Shagun Chowdhary; Shreyasi Singh; Varsha Tomar	Iran; Fatemeh Amiri; Narges Ranjbar; Sepideh Sirani	Thailand; Chattaya Kitcharoen; Janejira Srisongkram; Nanpapas Viravaidya
Skeet	Nutchaya Sutarporn; Thailand	Afrah Bin Hussain; Kuwait	Chalalai Nasakul; Thailand
Skeet team	Thailand; Isarapa Imprasertsuk; Chalalai Nasakul; Nutchaya Sutarporn	Kuwait; Shaikhah Al-Rashidi; Eman Al-Shamaa; Afrah Bin Hussain	Kazakhstan; Elvira Akchurina; Karina Pronichsheva; Anastassiya Molchanova

== Medal table ==
Rank	Nation	Gold	Silver	Bronze	Total
1	Kuwait	3	4	3	10
2	India	3	3	1	7
3	United Arab Emirates	2	1	0	3
4	Thailand	2	0	2	4
5	Iran	0	1	1	2
5	Japan	0	1	1	2
7	Kazakhstan	0	0	2	2
Totals (7 entries)		10	10	10	30
