= 2014 Asian Shotgun Championships =

International sport shooting competition

- Host city: Al-Ain, United Arab Emirates
- Dates: 1–10 November 2014
- Main venue: Equestrian, Shooting & Golf Club

The 2014 Asian Shotgun Championships were held at Equestrian, Shooting & Golf Club, Al-Ain, United Arab Emirates between 1 and 10 November 2014.

== Medal summary ==
=== Men ===
Event	Gold	Silver	Bronze
Trap	Abdulrahman Al-Faihan; Kuwait	Mohammed Ali Khejaim; Qatar	Abdulla Buhaliba; United Arab Emirates
Trap team	United Arab Emirates; Dhaher Al-Aryani; Hamad Al-Kendi; Abdulla Buhaliba	Qatar; Rashid Hamad Al-Athba; Mohammed Al-Rumaihi; Mohammed Ali Khejaim	Kuwait; Abdulrahman Al-Faihan; Naser Al-Meqlad; Talal Al-Rashidi
Double trap	Ankur Mittal; India	Ahmad Al-Afasi; Kuwait	Mohammed Asab; India
Double trap team	Kuwait; Ahmad Al-Afasi; Hamad Al-Afasi; Saad Al-Mutairi	United Arab Emirates; Khaled Al-Kaabi; Yahya Al-Mheiri; Saif Al-Shamsi	India; Mohammed Asab; Sangram Dahiya; Ankur Mittal
Skeet	Saif Bin Futtais; United Arab Emirates	Zaid Al-Mutairi; Kuwait	Vladislav Mukhamediyev; Kazakhstan
Skeet team	Kuwait; Zaid Al-Mutairi; Mansour Al-Rashidi; Saud Habib	United Arab Emirates; Mohamed Hussain Ahmed; Saeed Al-Maktoum; Saif Bin Futtais	Kazakhstan; Vitaliy Kulikov; Vladislav Mukhamediyev; Alexandr Yechshenko

=== Women ===
Event	Gold	Silver	Bronze
Trap	Seema Tomar; India	Mariya Dmitriyenko; Kazakhstan	Yukie Nakayama; Japan
Trap team	India; Shagun Chowdhary; Shreyasi Singh; Seema Tomar	Japan; Keiko Hattoril; Megumi Inoue; Yukie Nakayama	North Korea; Chae Hye-gyong; Pak Yong-hui; Yang Sol-i
Skeet	Angelina Michshuk; Kazakhstan	Deena Al-Tebaishi; Qatar	Naoko Ishihara; Japan
Skeet team	Kazakhstan; Zhaniya Aidarkhanova; Elvira Akchurina; Angelina Michshuk	North Korea; Kim Hyang-sun; Kim Myong-hwa; Kim Un-hye	Qatar; Amal Al-Rafeea; Reem Al-Sharshani; Deena Al-Tebaishi

== Medal table ==
Rank	Nation	Gold	Silver	Bronze	Total
1	Kuwait	3	2	1	6
2	India	3	0	2	5
3	United Arab Emirates	2	2	1	5
4	Kazakhstan	2	1	2	5
5	Qatar	0	3	1	4
6	Japan	0	1	2	3
7	North Korea	0	1	1	2
Totals (7 entries)		10	10	10	30
