= 2019 Asian Shotgun Championships =

- Host city: Almaty, Kazakhstan
- Dates: 20–30 September 2019
- Main venue: Asanov Shooting Club

The 2019 Asian Shotgun Championships ASC was the 9th Asian Shotgun Championships which took place from 20 to 30 September 2019, at Asanov Shooting Club, Almaty, Kazakhstan.

== Medal summary ==
=== Men ===
Event	Gold	Silver	Bronze
Trap	Naser Al-Meqlad; Kuwait	Viktor Khassyanov; Kazakhstan	Saleem Al-Nasri; Oman
Trap team	Kazakhstan; Alexandr Fedorov; Viktor Khassyanov; Andrey Mogilevskiy	Kuwait; Abdulrahman Al-Faihan; Naser Al-Meqlad; Khaled Al-Mudhaf	China; He Weidong; Liu Jie; Yu Haicheng
Double trap	Hamad Al-Marri; Qatar	Jarrah Al-Showaier; Kuwait	Alexandr Fedorov; Kazakhstan
Double trap team	Qatar; Masoud Hamad Al-Athba; Rashid Hamad Al-Athba; Hamad Al-Marri	Kazakhstan; Alexandr Fedorov; Maxim Kolomoyets; Shyngys Yegemkul	Kuwait; Naser Al-Meqlad; Saad Al-Mutairi; Jarrah Al-Showaier
Skeet	Jin Di; China	Saif Bin Futtais; United Arab Emirates	Rashid Saleh Al-Athba; Qatar
Skeet team	China; Dun Yueheng; Jin Di; Tang Shuai	Qatar; Masoud Saleh Al-Athba; Rashid Saleh Al-Athba; Abdulaziz Al-Attiyah	Kuwait; Abdullah Al-Rashidi; Mansour Al-Rashidi; Abdulaziz Al-Saad

=== Women ===
Event	Gold	Silver	Bronze
Trap	Sarah Al-Hawal; Kuwait	Anastassiya Davydova; Kazakhstan	Liu Yingzi; China
Trap team	China; Huang Xiaoman; Liu Yingzi; Zhang Xinqiu	Kazakhstan; Anastassiya Davydova; Mariya Dmitriyenko; Sarsenkul Rysbekova	Kuwait; Hajar Abdulmalik; Sarah Al-Hawal; Shahad Al-Hawal
Skeet	Wei Meng; China	Isarapa Imprasertsuk; Thailand	Assem Orynbay; Kazakhstan
Skeet team	China; Shi Hongyan; Wei Meng; Zhang Donglian	Thailand; Isarapa Imprasertsuk; Sutiya Jiewchaloemmit; Nutchaya Sutarporn	Kazakhstan; Angelina Michshuk; Assem Orynbay; Olga Panarina

=== Mixed ===
Event	Gold	Silver	Bronze
Trap team	Kazakhstan; Viktor Khassyanov; Mariya Dmitriyenko	Lebanon; Alain Moussa; Ray Bassil	China; Yu Haicheng; Liu Yingzi

== Medal table ==
Rank	Nation	Gold	Silver	Bronze	Total
1	China	5	0	3	8
2	Kazakhstan	2	4	3	9
3	Kuwait	2	2	3	7
4	Qatar	2	1	1	4
5	Thailand	0	2	0	2
6	Lebanon	0	1	0	1
6	United Arab Emirates	0	1	0	1
8	Oman	0	0	1	1
Totals (8 entries)		11	11	11	33
