= Mansour Al-Rashidi =

Kuwaiti sport shooter

Personal information
- Born: Mansour Al-Rashedi; April 12, 1984 (age 42) Kuwait

Sport
- Country: Kuwait
- Sport: Shooting
- Event: Skeet
Medal record
Representing Kuwait
Asian Games
Gold medal – first place	2018 Jakarta-Palembang	Skeet
Asian Championships
Gold medal – first place	2014 Al-Ain	Skeet team
Gold medal – first place	2017 Astana	Skeet team
Gold medal – first place	2018 Kuwait City	Skeet team
Gold medal – first place	2025 Shymkent	Skeet team
Silver medal – second place	2022 Almaty	Skeet team
Silver medal – second place	2025 Shymkent	Skeet
Bronze medal – third place	2014 Al-Ain	Skeet
Bronze medal – third place	2019 Almaty	Skeet team
Islamic Solidarity Games
Gold medal – first place	2021 Konya	Skeet
- Updated on 27 August 2018

Mansour Al-Rashidi (born 12 April 1984) is a Kuwaiti sport shooter. He was the 2018 Asian Games champion on the Men's skeet event.
