= Naser Al-Meqlad =

Kuwaiti sport shooter

Personal information
- Nationality: Kuwait
- Born: 12 August 1982 (age 43) Kuwait City, Kuwait
- Height: 1.76 m (5 ft 9 1/2 in)
- Weight: 120 kg (265 lb)

Sport
- Sport: Shooting
- Event: Trap
- Club: Kuwait Shooting Club
Medal record
Men's shooting
Representing Kuwait
Asian Games
Gold medal – first place	2006 Doha	Trap
Gold medal – first place	2006 Doha	Trap team
Gold medal – first place	2010 Guangzhou	Trap
Gold medal – first place	2010 Guangzhou	Trap team
Asian Championships
Gold medal – first place	2012 Doha	Trap team
Gold medal – first place	2019 Doha	Trap team
Silver medal – second place	2007 Kuwait City	Trap
Silver medal – second place	2007 Kuwait City	Trap team
Bronze medal – third place	2019 Doha	Trap
Asian Shotgun Championships
Gold medal – first place	2009 Almaty	Trap team
Gold medal – first place	2019 Almaty	Trap
Gold medal – first place	2019 Almaty	Trap team
Gold medal – first place	2022 Almaty	Trap
Silver medal – second place	2012 Patiala	Trap team
Silver medal – second place	2022 Almaty	Trap team
Bronze medal – third place	2011 Kuala Lumpur	Trap team
Bronze medal – third place	2012 Patiala	Trap
Bronze medal – third place	2014 Al-Ain	Trap team
Bronze medal – third place	2019 Almaty	Double trap team
Bronze medal – third place	2024 Kuwait City	Trap team
Bronze medal – third place	2024 Kuwait City	Mixed trap team

Naser Al-Meqlad (also Naser Meqlad, Arabic: ناصر المقلد; born August 12, 1982, in Kuwait City) is a Kuwaiti sport shooter. He won two gold medals for the individual trap shooting at the 2006 Asian Games in Doha, Qatar, and at the 2010 Asian Games in Guangzhou, China.

At age twenty-one, Meqlad made his official debut for the 2004 Summer Olympics in Athens, where he finished fourteenth out of thirty-five shooters in the qualifying rounds of the men's trap, with a score of 117 points, tying his position with five other shooters, including Germany's Karsten Bindrich.

At the 2008 Summer Olympics in Beijing, Meqlad competed for the second time in men's trap shooting, where was able to fire 71 targets on the first day, and 44 on the second day, for a total score of 115 points, finishing only in eighteenth place.
