= Lee Suk-tae (sport shooter) =

South Korean sport shooter

Personal information
- Born: 12 April 1973 (age 53) North Gyeongsang

Sport
- Sport: Sports shooting
- College team: Kyung Hee University

Korean name
- Hangul: 이석태
- Hanja: 李錫泰
- RR: I Seoktae
- MR: I Sŏkt'ae

Lee Suk-tae (born 12 April 1973) is a South Korean sport shooter who competed in the 2004 Summer Olympics.
