= Qu Ridong =

Chinese sport shooter (born 1968)

Medal record

Men's shooting

Representing China

Asian Championships
Silver medal – second place	2007 Kuwait City	Skeet

Qu Ridong (born 1968-12-22 in Guiyang, Guizhou) is a male Chinese sports shooter. He competed for Team China at the 2008 Summer Olympics in the Double Trap Men event. He belongs to the Henan Provincial Shooting and Archery Administrative Center.

== Major performances ==
- 2006 World Cup Guangzhou - 1st skeet;
- 2007 Asian Championships - 2nd skeet;
- 2008 World Cup Beijing - 1st skeet;
