= Jan-Henrik Heinrich =

German sports shooter

Jan-Henrik Heinrich (born 19 July 1963) is a German sport shooter who competed in the 1996 Summer Olympics and in the 2000 Summer Olympics. In 1996, he tied for 26th place in the men's skeet event. In 2000, he tied for 14th place in the men's skeet event.
