= Khurram Inam =

Pakistani sports shooter (born 1966)

Sport
- Club: Pakistan Navy Shooting Range
- Coached by: Razi Ahmed Khan

Khurram Inam (born 28 October 1966, in Karachi) is a Pakistani skeet shooter. He is a three time Olympian. He represented Pakistan at the 2000 Sydney Olympics, 2004 Athens Olympics and 2012 London Olympics.

== Olympic Games ==
Inam first participated at the 2000 Summer Olympics in Sydney, Australia where he placed 23T. At the 2004 Summer Olympics in Athens, Greece he placed 37T. He participated in his third Olympics in 2012 in London, UK, finishing 28th.
