= Zaid Al-Mutairi =

Kuwaiti sport shooter (born 1982)

Personal information
- Nationality: Kuwait
- Born: 25 March 1982 (age 44)
- Height: 1.69 m (5 ft 6 1/2 in)
- Weight: 64 kg (141 lb)

Sport
- Sport: Shooting
- Event: Skeet
- Club: Kuwait Shooting Club
- Coached by: Rustam Yambulatov
Medal record
Men's shooting
Representing Kuwait
Asian Games
Silver medal – second place	2006 Doha	Skeet team
Asian Championships
Gold medal – first place	2007 Kuwait City	Skeet team
Silver medal – second place	2012 Doha	Skeet team
Silver medal – second place	2015 Kuwait City	Skeet team
Asian Shotgun Championships
Gold medal – first place	2012 Patiala	Skeet team
Gold medal – first place	2014 Al-Ain	Skeet team
Gold medal – first place	2016 Abu Dhabi	Skeet team
Silver medal – second place	2009 Almaty	Skeet team
Silver medal – second place	2013 Almaty	Skeet team
Silver medal – second place	2014 Al-Ain	Skeet
Bronze medal – third place	2012 Patiala	Skeet

Zaid Al-Mutairi (Arabic: زيد المطيري; born March 25, 1982) is a Kuwaiti sport shooter. He won a silver medal, as a member of the Kuwaiti shooting team, at the 2006 Asian Games in Doha, Qatar. He also captured two more medals for skeet shooting at the ISSF World Cup circuit (2007 in Maribor, Slovenia, and 2009 in San Marino).

Al-Mutairi represented Kuwait at the 2008 Summer Olympics in Beijing, where he competed in the men's skeet shooting, along with four-time Olympian Abdullah Al-Rashidi. He finished only in tenth place by two points behind his teammate Al-Rashidi, for a total score of 118 targets in the two-day qualifying rounds, and one additional point from the shoot-off match.
