= Abdullah Al-Rashidi =

Kuwaiti sports shooter (born 1963)

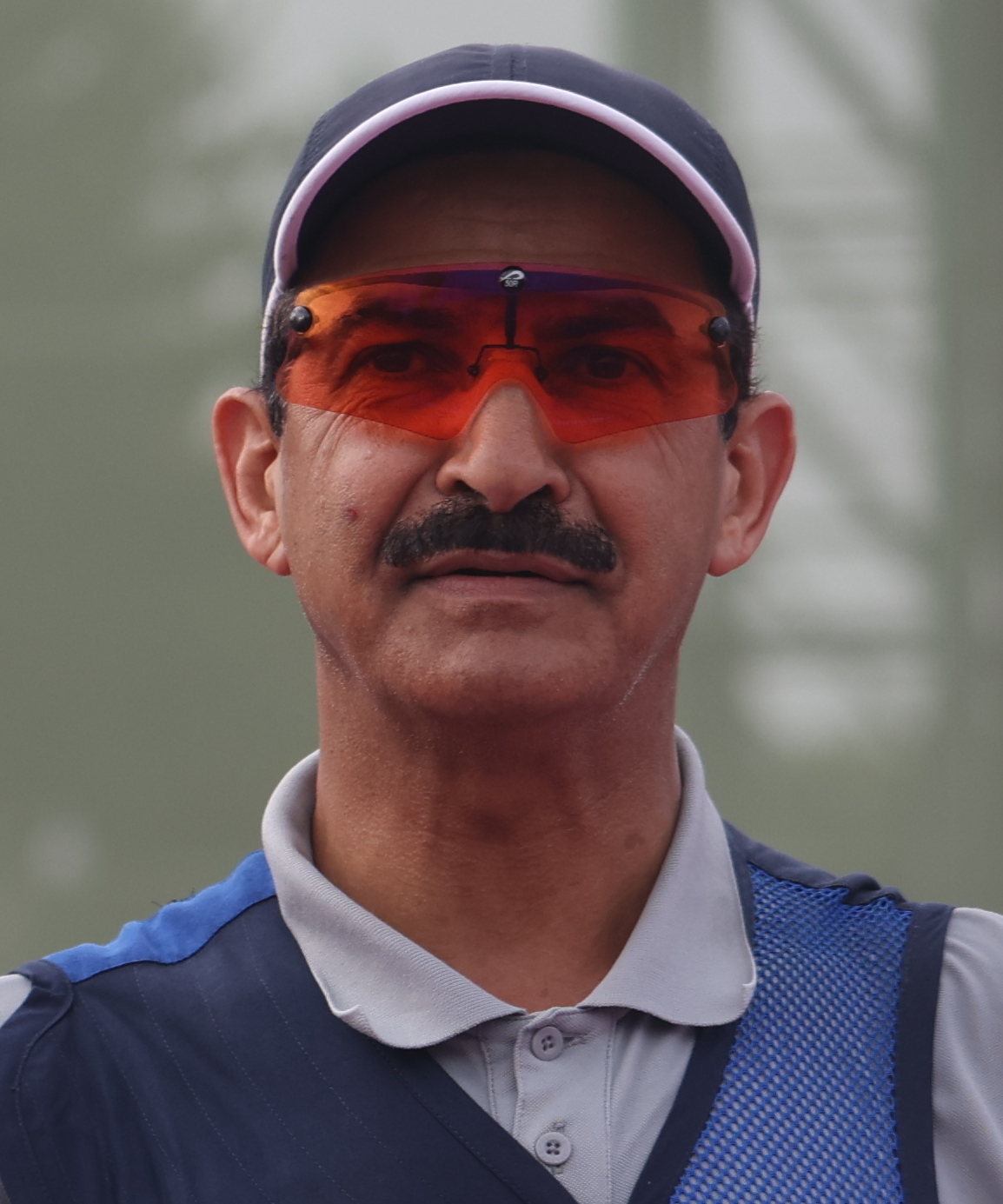
- Al-Rashidi at the 2020 Summer Olympic Games

Personal information
- Born: August 23, 1963 (age 63) Kuwait City, Kuwait
- Height: 1.83 m (6 ft 0 in)
- Weight: 84 kg (185 lb)

Sport
- Country: Kuwait
- Sport: Shooting
- Event: Skeet

Achievements and titles
- Olympic finals: Bronze medal at Rio Summer Olympics 2016
Medal record
Representing Kuwait
Olympic Games
Bronze medal – third place	2020 Tokyo	Skeet
World Championships
Gold medal – first place	1995 Nicosia	Skeet
Gold medal – first place	1997 Lima	Skeet
Gold medal – first place	1998 Barcelona	Skeet
Bronze medal – third place	2011 Belgrade	Skeet
Asian Games
Gold medal – first place	1998 Bangkok	Skeet team
Gold medal – first place	2014 Incheon	Skeet
Gold medal – first place	2022 Hangzhou	Skeet
Silver medal – second place	1998 Bangkok	Skeet
Silver medal – second place	2006 Doha	Skeet team
Silver medal – second place	2014 Incheon	Skeet team
Silver medal – second place	2022 Hangzhou	Skeet mixed team
Silver medal – second place	2026 Aichi–Nagoya	Skeet team
Bronze medal – third place	1994 Hiroshima	Skeet team
Asian Championships
Gold medal – first place	2007 Kuwait City	Skeet
Gold medal – first place	2007 Kuwait City	Skeet team
Gold medal – first place	2025 Shymkent	Skeet team
Silver medal – second place	2012 Doha	Skeet
Silver medal – second place	2012 Doha	Skeet team
Silver medal – second place	2015 Kuwait City	Skeet team
Silver medal – second place	2019 Doha	Skeet team
Asian Shotgun Championships
Gold medal – first place	2009 Almaty	Skeet
Gold medal – first place	2012 Patiala	Skeet
Gold medal – first place	2012 Patiala	Skeet team
Gold medal – first place	2017 Astana	Skeet team
Gold medal – first place	2018 Kuwait City	Skeet team
Silver medal – second place	2009 Almaty	Skeet team
Silver medal – second place	2013 Almaty	Skeet
Silver medal – second place	2013 Almaty	Skeet team
Silver medal – second place	2022 Almaty	Skeet team
Silver medal – second place	2024 Kuwait City	Skeet team
Bronze medal – third place	2019 Almaty	Skeet team
Bronze medal – third place	2022 Almaty	Mixed skeet team
Representing the Kuwait
Asian Games
Gold medal – first place	2010 Guangzhou	Skeet
Silver medal – second place	2010 Guangzhou	Skeet team
Representing the Independent Olympic Athletes
Olympic Games
Bronze medal – third place	2016 Rio de Janeiro	Skeet
- Updated on 28 July 2021

Abdullah Al-Rashidi (born August 23, 1963) is a Kuwaiti sport shooter and three-time world champion. He competed at the Summer Olympics in 1996, 2000, 2004, 2008, 2012, 2016, and 2020, winning bronze medals in men's skeet in both 2016 (as an Independent Olympic Athlete) and 2020.

== Achievements ==
Abdullah Al-Rashidi won three gold medals at the World Shooting Championships, in 1995, 1997 and 1998 and took a bronze medal in 2011. Competing since 1989, he is also the winner of four World cup events. He has six gold and three silver medals from Asian Shooting Championships and two Asian Games golds and one silver medal.

=== 2016 Olympic games ===
In the 2016 Summer Olympics, Al-Rashidi competed as an "independent Olympic athlete" because Kuwait was banned from the Olympics by the IOC over Kuwaiti government interference in sport. He won the qualification, finished fourth in the semifinals and won the bronze medal match against Ukraine's Mikola Milchev, the winner from Sydney in 2000.

As his status of being an independent Olympian did not enable the restriction of the uniform of his national team, he received media attention for competing whilst wearing the training shirt of Arsenal F.C. despite not being a supporter himself, leading to people on social media to draw comparison to him and the team's performance in the Premier League.

Al-Rashidi won his second Olympic bronze medal in the 2020 Summer Olympics in Tokyo, this time competing for Kuwait.

== Olympic results ==
Event	1996	2000	2004	2008	2012	2016	2020
Skeet (men)	T-42nd	T-14th	T-8th	T-7th	21st	3rd place, bronze medalist(s)	3rd place, bronze medalist(s)
