= Cho Yong-seong =

South Korean sport shooter

- Hangul: 조용성
- RR: Jo Yongseong
- MR: Cho Yongsŏng

Cho Yong-seong (born January 25, 1986) is a South Korean sport shooter. At the 2012 Summer Olympics he competed in the Men's skeet, finishing in 35th place.
