= Nasser al-Attiyah =

Qatari rally driver and sport shooter (born 1970)

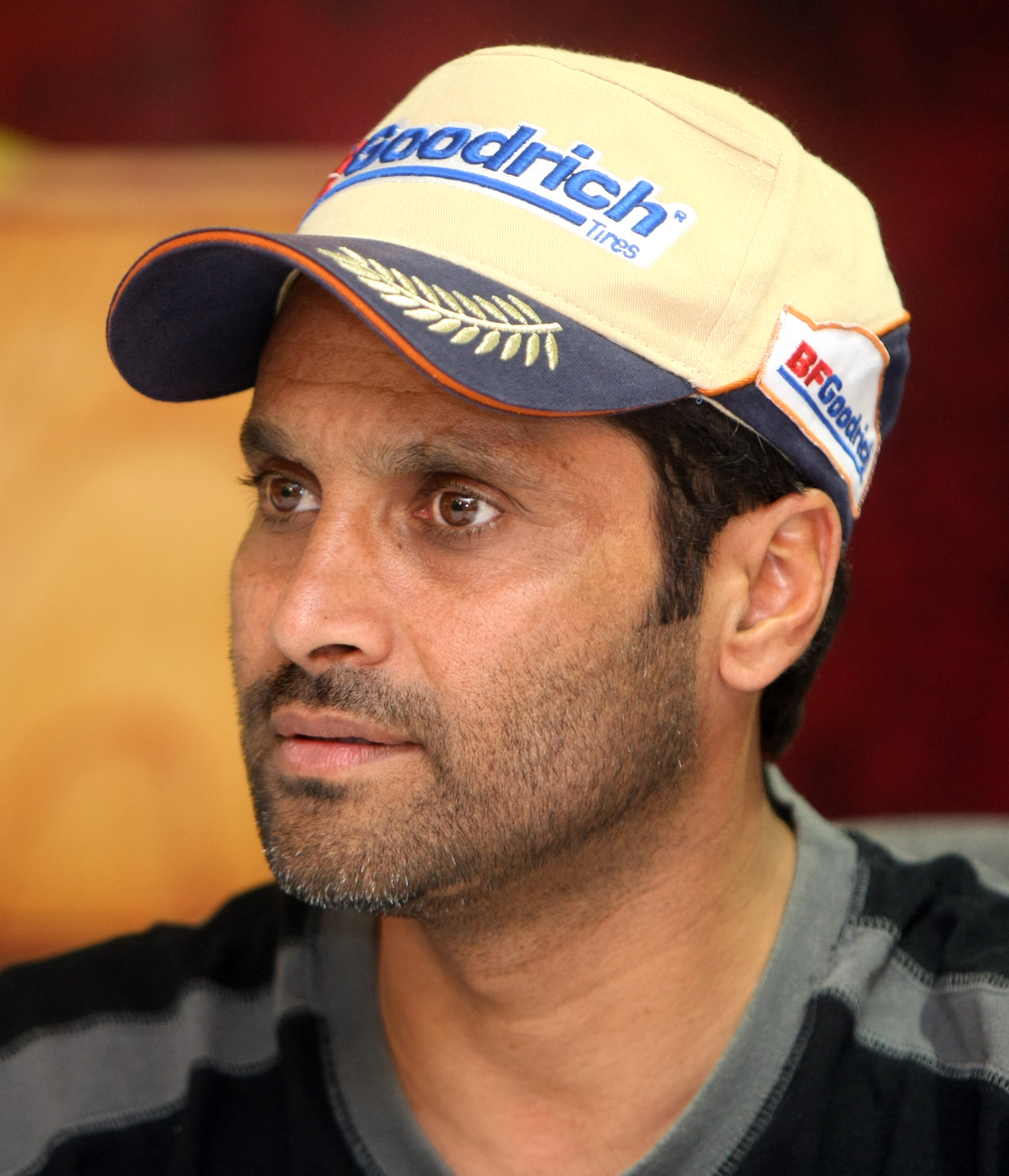

Personal information
- Full name: Nasser Saleh Nasser Abdullah al-Attiyah
- Born: 21 December 1970 (age 55) Doha, Qatar
- Height: 1.78 m (5 ft 10 in)
- Weight: 82 kg (181 lb)

Sport
- Country: Qatar
- Sport: Rallying; Rally raid Shooting

Achievements and titles
- World finals: CCB 2008; CCB 2023; CCR 2008; CCR 2015; CCR 2016; CCR 2017; CCR 2021; W2RC 2022; W2RC 2023; W2RC 2024; Dakar 2011; Dakar 2015; Dakar 2019; Dakar 2022; Dakar 2023; Dakar 2026; P-WRC 2006; WRC2 2014; WRC2 2015
Medal record
Men's shooting
Representing Qatar
Olympic Games
Bronze medal – third place	2012 London	Skeet
Asian Games
Gold medal – first place	2002 Busan	Skeet team
Gold medal – first place	2010 Guangzhou	Skeet team
Gold medal – first place	2026 Aichi–Nagoya	Skeet team
Silver medal – second place	2022 Hangzhou	Skeet team
Bronze medal – third place	2022 Hangzhou	Skeet
Bronze medal – third place	2010 Guangzhou	Skeet
Asian Championships
Gold medal – first place	2001 Bangkok	Skeet
Gold medal – first place	2006 Singapore	Skeet
Gold medal – first place	2012 Doha	Skeet
Gold medal – first place	2012 Doha	Skeet team
Gold medal – first place	2019 Doha	Skeet team
Silver medal – second place	1995 Jakarta	Skeet
Silver medal – second place	2003 Delhi	Skeet
Silver medal – second place	2007 Kuwait City	Skeet team
Cross country rally
Representing Qatar
World Rally-Raid Championship
Gold medal – first place	2008	Cross-country
Silver medal – second place	2014	Cross-country
Gold medal – first place	2015	Cross-country
Gold medal – first place	2016	Cross-country
Gold medal – first place	2017	Cross-country
Silver medal – second place	2019	Cross-country
Gold medal – first place	2021	Cross-country
Gold medal – first place	2022	Cross-country
Gold medal – first place	2023	Cross-country
Gold medal – first place	2024	Cross-country
FIA World Cup for Cross-Country Bajas
Bronze medal – third place	2005	Bajas
Gold medal – first place	2008	Bajas
Bronze medal – third place	2020	Bajas
Gold medal – first place	2023	Bajas

Nasser Salih Nasser Abdullah al-Attiyah (Arabic: نَاصِر صَالِح نَاصِر عَبْد الله الْعَطِيَّة : nāṣir ṣāliḥ nāṣir ʿabd allāh al-ʿaṭiyyah; born 21 December 1970) is a Qatari rally driver and sport shooter. He was the 2006 Production World Rally Champion, 2014 and 2015 WRC-2 champion, a 20-time Middle East Rally Champion, a five-time FIA World Cup for Cross-Country Rallies champion, a three-time World Rally-Raid Champion, and a six-time (2011, 2015, 2019, 2022, 2023, 2026) Dakar Rally winner. His six victories in the Dakar Rally make him the only Middle Easterner and West Asian to win the competition more than once.

In shooting, al-Attiyah won the bronze medal in the men's skeet event at the 2012 Summer Olympics in London.

== Career ==
=== Rallying ===
Having been inspired to start racing by Formula One world champion Jackie Stewart's book Winning Is Not Enough, al-Attiyah started competing in the Middle East Rally Championship in 2003, where he claimed 65 race wins and 13 titles. He drove a Subaru Impreza until 2009 and a Ford Fiesta since 2010, except in 2012 when he drove Peugeot 207 in two rounds, and in 2016 when he drove a Škoda Fabia.

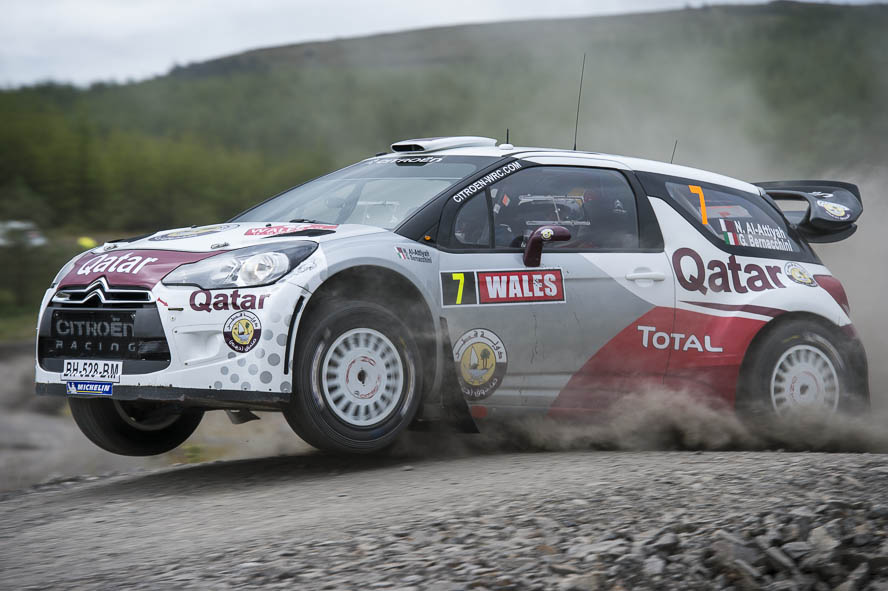
Al-Attiyah competing in the 2012 Wales Rally GB

Al-Attiyah also competed at the Production World Rally Championship from 2004 to 2009. He won the title in 2006, his third year in the championship alongside co-driver Chris Patterson, driving a Subaru Impreza. He gained the championship lead after finishing second in the PWRC class in the Rally Mexico and afterwards won the following two rounds, Rally Argentina and Acropolis Rally. He also finished runner-up in 2005 and third in 2009. He scored his first points during the 2009 season, finishing eighth overall in the Rally Argentina.

In 2010 and 2011, al-Attiyah drove in the Super 2000 World Rally Championship for the Barwa Rally Team, classifying seventh overall in both years. For the 2012 season, al-Attiyah moved to compete in the top division for the Qatar World Rally Team. He secured a career-best fourth place at the Rally de Portugal. In 2013, he switched to a Ford Fiesta WRC. He finished fifth overall at three races, and ranked 11th in the final standings.

Al-Attiyah stepped back to the WRC-2 in 2014. Driving a Ford Fiesta RRC, he scored four wins and won the championship. In 2015, he defended the championship with three wins.

In 2023, Al-Attyah claimed his 19th championship in the MERC. In an unprecedented case, he shared the title with Abdullah Al-Rawahi, as the pair had scored the same results across five events.

=== Cross-country rally ===
Al-Attiyah debuted at the Dakar Rally in 2004 with Mitsubishi, finishing tenth overall. He entered the next three editions with an X-Raid BMW, finishing sixth in 2007.

After winning the 2008 FIA Cross Country Rally World Cup in a BMW, al-Attiyah took part alongside Swedish female co-driver Tina Thörner in the 2009 Dakar Rally in Argentina. He was among the frontrunners until he got disqualified on 8 January 2009 after he had missed nine checkpoints, the rules stating that four missed checkpoints are the maximum. He finished second in the Rally dos Sertões from Goiânia to Natal in Brazil (24 June-3 July 2009) behind Carlos Sainz of Spain.

In the 2010 Dakar Rally, al-Attiyah finished second, 2'12" behind Carlos Sainz, the smallest gap in the history of the race. On 15 January 2011, al-Attiyah won the legendary Dakar race ahead of fellow Volkswagen drivers Sainz and Giniel de Villiers, making him the only Arab to ever win the difficult race.

Al-Attiyah claimed the 2015 FIA Cross Country Rally World Cup with five wins and the 2015 Dakar Rally, driving a Mini All4 Racing X-Raid, and the 2016 FIA Cross Country Rally World Cup for Toyota with six wins.

In 2019, al-Attiyah won the Silk Way Rally driving Toyota Hilux for the Toyota Gazoo Racing team. He finished second place in the 2019 Baja 1000. He also won the 2019 Dakar Rally.

In 2022, al-Attiyah won the 2022 Dakar Rally in Saudi Arabia, making him the only Arab to win the Dakar rally on Arab soil, ahead of nine-time World Rally Champion Sébastien Loeb (co-driver Fabian Lurquin). He would also win the inaugural FIA World Rally-Raid Championship title.

In 2023, al-Attiyah won 2023 Dakar Rally, winning the rally for the fifth time in his career, again finishing ahead of Sébastien Loeb. With two further victories, the Qatari would defend his W2RC title. During the same season, he and co-driver Mathieu Baumel would also clinch the World Cup for Cross-Country Bajas.

Ahead of the 2024 campaign, al-Attiyah would leave Toyota to partner Sébastien Loeb at Prodrive.

=== Extreme E ===
Al-Attiyah signed with Abt Cupra XE to race in the 2022 Extreme E Championship, first alongside 2001 Dakar Rally winner Jutta Kleinschmidt and later with Klara Andersson. The team scored a win in Chile and a third place in Chile, ranking sixth in points. Al-Attiyah and Andersson continued together at Abt Cupra for the 2023 season. Al-Attiyah raced the first four rounds of the season and was replaced by Sébastien Loeb and Adrien Tambay in Rounds 5–8 and 9–10 respectively as he focuses on the Baja World Cup.

=== Shooting ===
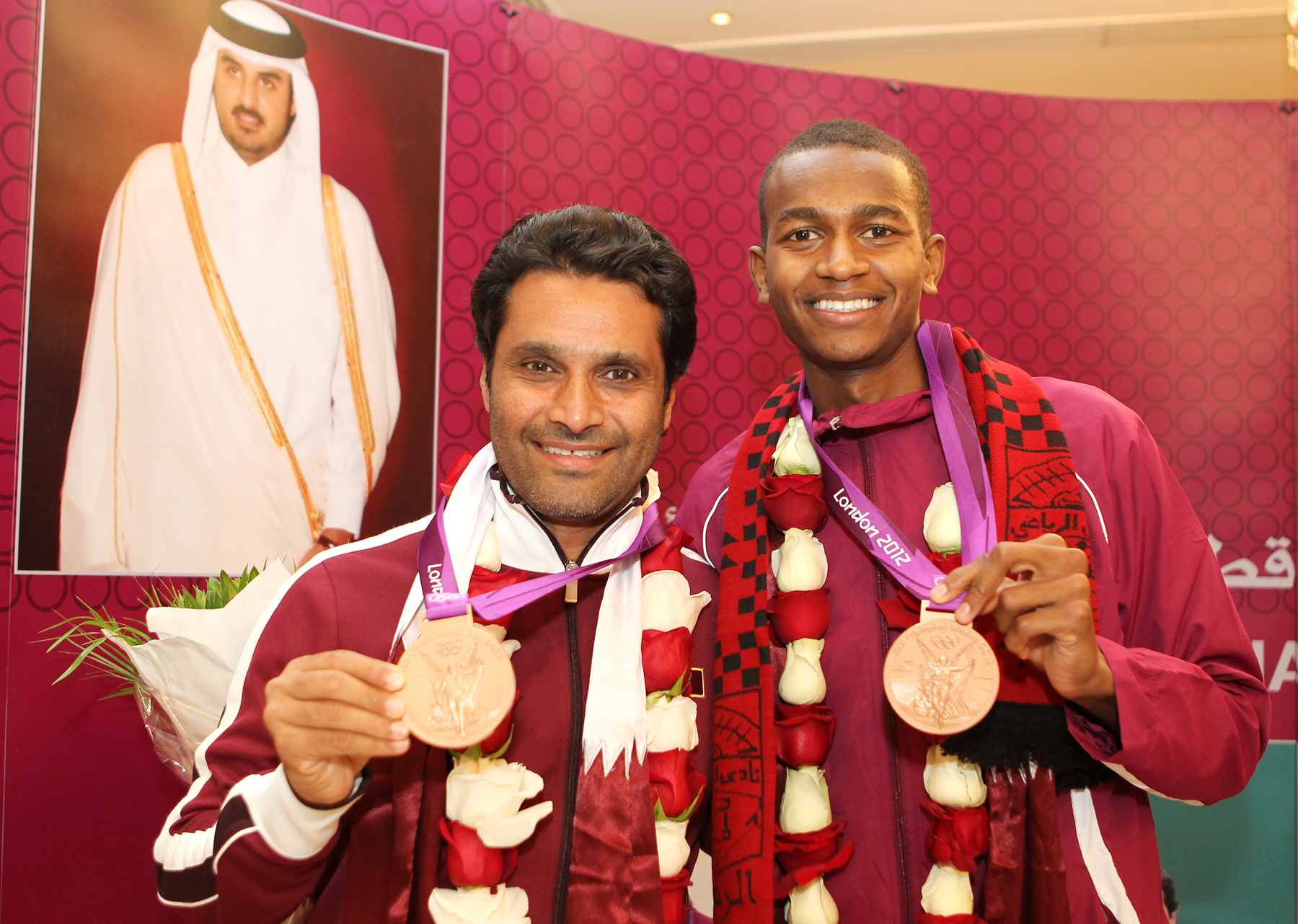
Nasser al-Attiyah (left) posing for a picture with Mutaz Essa Barshim after winning bronze at the 2012 Summer Olympics

In shooting, al-Attiyah came in fourth place in the 2004 Olympic Games in clay pigeon shooting and 15th overall in the 2008 Olympic Games, missing out on qualification for the final round by two points. In the 2012 Olympic Games, he won the bronze medal after a shoot-off against Valeriy Shomin.

Olympic results
Event	1996	2000	2004	2008	2012	2016
Skeet	15th 120	6th 122+23	4th 122+25	15th 117	3rd 121+23+6	31st 111

World records held in Skeet from 2005 to 2012
Men	Qualification	125	Vincent Hancock (USA); Tore Brovold (NOR); Mykola Milchev (UKR); Jan Sychra (CZE); Tore Brovold (NOR); Jan Sychra (CZE); Antonakis Andreou (CYP); Juan José Aramburu (ESP); Nasser Al-Attiyah (QAT); Anthony Terras (FRA); Efthimios Mitas (GRE)	14 June 2007; 13 July 2008; 9 May 2009; 20 May 2009; 25 July 2009; 7 March 2011; 22 April 2011; 13 September 2011; 17 January 2012; 26 March 2012; 26 March 2012	Lonato (ITA); Nicosia (CYP); Cairo (EGY); Munich (GER); Osijek (CRO); Concepción (CHI); Beijing (CHN); Belgrade (SER); Doha (QAT); Tucson (USA); Tucson (USA)
Men	Final	150	Vincent Hancock (USA) (125+25); Tore Brovold (NOR) (125+25); Tore Brovold (NOR) (125+25); Jan Sychra (CZE) (125+25); Nasser Al-Attiyah (QAT) (125+25); Efthimios Mitas (GRE) (125+25)	14 June 2007; 13 July 2008; 25 July 2009; 7 March 2011; 17 January 2012; 26 March 2012	Lonato (ITA); Nicosia (CYP); Osijek (CRO); Concepción (CHI); Doha (QAT); Tucson (USA)

== Personal life ==
Al-Attiyah is a distant relative of Tamim bin Hamad Al Thani, Emir of Qatar.

== Career results ==
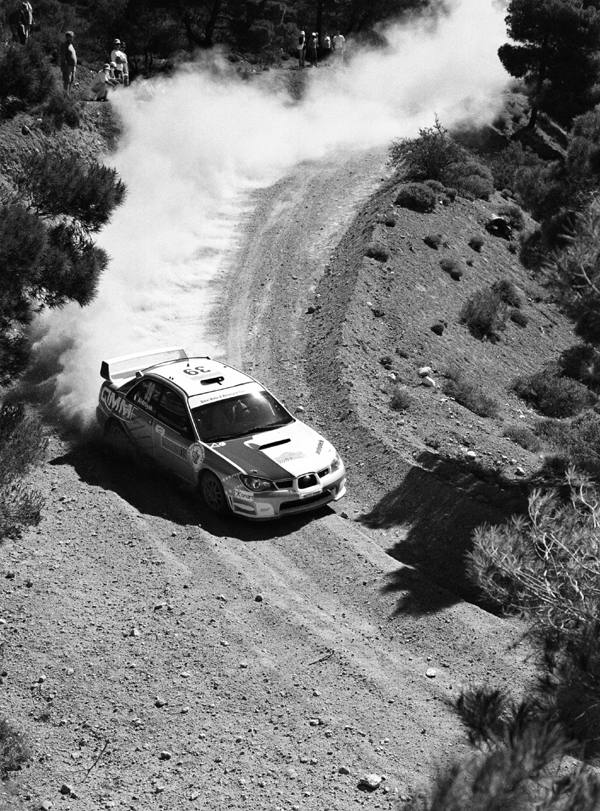
Al-Attiyah drives a Subaru Impreza WRX STI at the 2006 Acropolis Rally

=== Circuit racing career summary ===
Season	Series	Team	Races	Wins	Poles	F/Laps	Podiums	Points	Position
2008-09	Speedcar Series	Team Barwa	2	0	0	0	0	0	17th
2009	Qatar National Road Racing Championship		2	0	0	0	1	12	12th
2010	24 Hours of Nürburgring - AT	Volkswagen Motorsport	1	1	?	?	1	N/A	**1st**
2011	24 Hours of Nürburgring - AT	Volkswagen Motorsport	1	1	0	0	1	N/A	**1st**
2013-14	Porsche GT3 Cup Challenge Middle East		6	0	0	0	0	70	15th
2015	World Touring Car Championship	Campos Racing	2	0	0	0	0	0	NC

=== WRC results ===
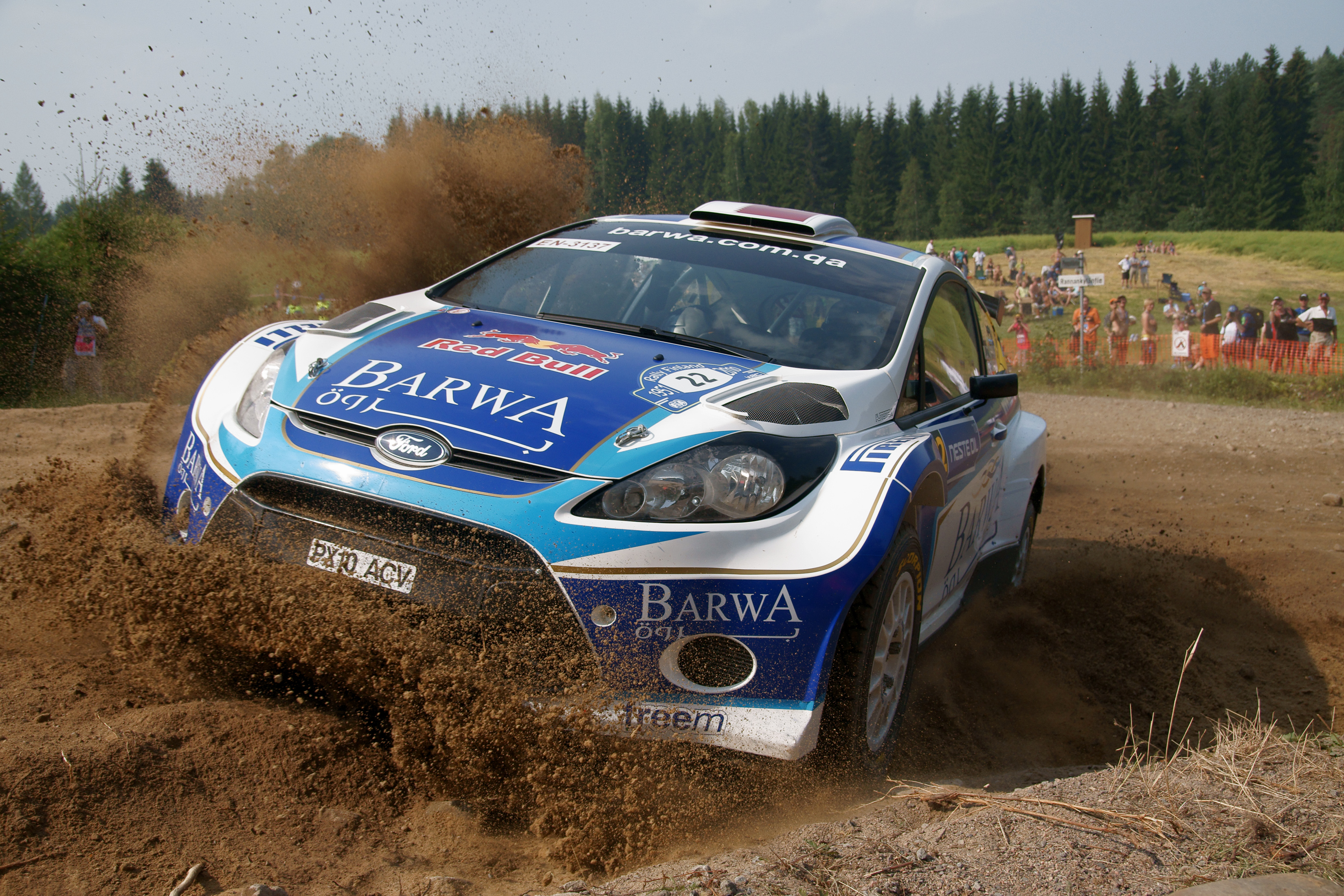
Al-Attiyah drives a Ford Fiesta S2000 at the 2010 Rally Finland

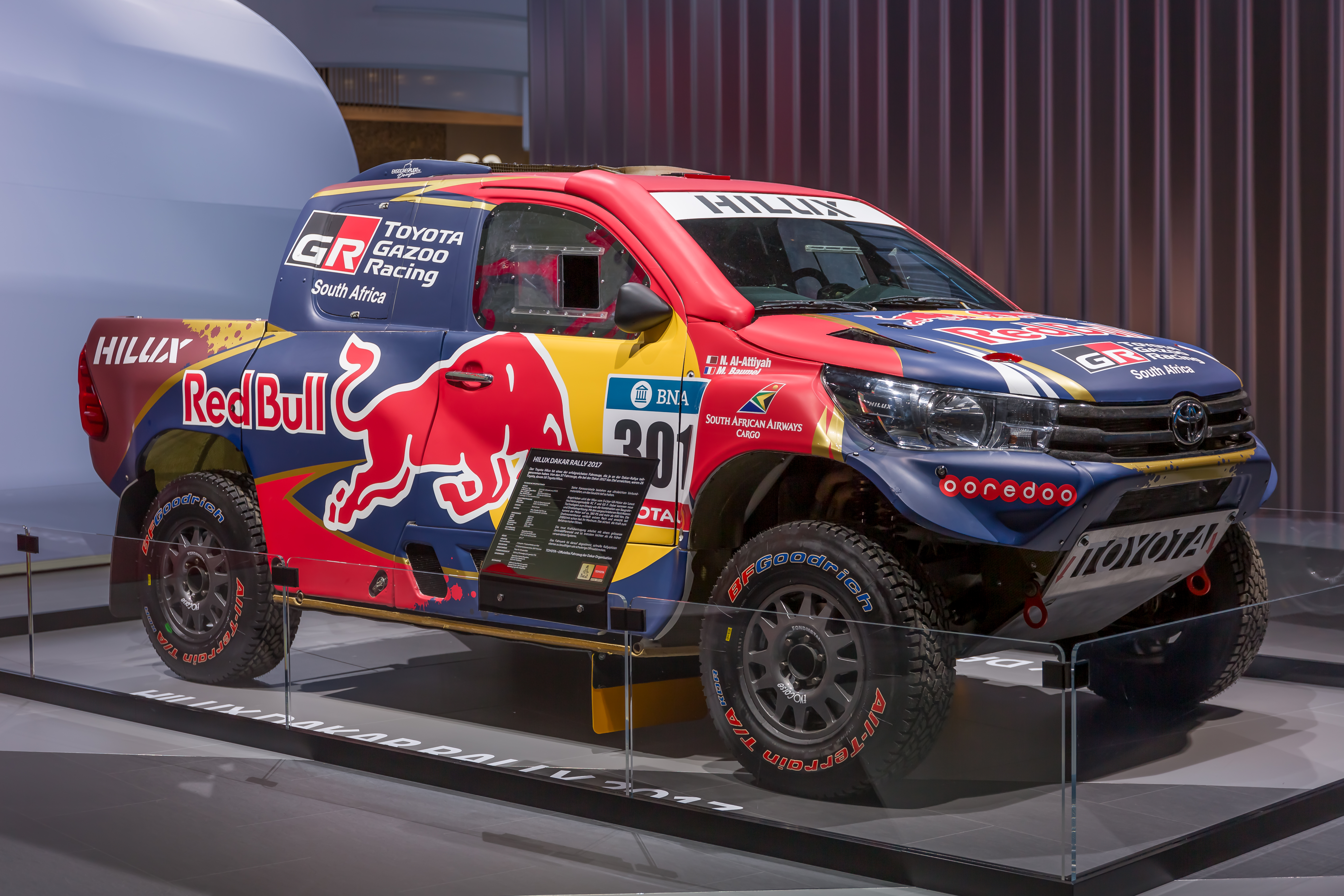
Al-Attiyah's Hilux from 2017

Year	Entrant	Car	1	2	3	4	5	6	7	8	9	10	11	12	13	14	15	16	WDC	Pts
2004	Nasser Al-Attiyah	Subaru Impreza WRX STi	MON	SWE; 32	MEX; Ret	NZL; 20	CYP	GRE	TUR	ARG; 14	FIN	GER	JPN	GBR	ITA	FRA; 22	ESP	AUS; 13	NC	0
2005	Nasser Al-Attiyah	Subaru Impreza WRX STi	MON	SWE	MEX	NZL; 16	ITA	CYP; 18	TUR; 16	GRE	ARG; 17	FIN	GER	GBR; 21	JPN	FRA	ESP	AUS; 13	NC	0
2006	QMMF	Subaru Impreza WRX Spec C	MON; 30	SWE	MEX; 10	ESP	FRA	ARG; 15	ITA	GRE; 17	GER	FIN	JPN	CYP; 19	TUR	AUS	NZL; 26	GBR	NC	0
2007	QMMF	Subaru Impreza WRX Spec C	MON	SWE; 27	NOR	MEX; Ret	POR	ARG; Ret	ITA	GRE; 19	FIN	GER	NZL	ESP	FRA	JPN	IRE; 17	GBR	NC	0
2008	QMMF	Subaru Impreza WRX STi	MON	SWE; 40	MEX	ARG; Ret	JOR	ITA	GRE; Ret										NC	0
2008	QMMF	Subaru Impreza STi N14								TUR; 23	FIN	GER	NZL	ESP	FRA	JPN	GBR; Ret		NC	0
2009	Autotek	Subaru Impreza STi N14	IRE	NOR	CYP; 11														18th	1
2009	Barwa Rally Team	Subaru Impreza STi N14				POR; 16	ARG; 8	ITA; 9	GRE; DSQ	POL	FIN	AUS	ESP	GBR; Ret					18th	1
2010	Barwa Rally Team	Škoda Fabia S2000	SWE	MEX; Ret	JOR; 18	TUR	NZL; 13												NC	0
2010	Barwa Rally Team	Ford Fiesta S2000						POR; 25	BUL	FIN; 29	GER	JPN	FRA	ESP	GBR				NC	0
2011	Barwa Rally Team	Ford Fiesta S2000	SWE	MEX; EX	POR	JOR; Ret	ITA; 11	ARG	GRE; 16	FIN	GER; 16	AUS	FRA; Ret	ESP; 11	GBR				NC	0
2012	Qatar World Rally Team	Citroën DS3 WRC	MON	SWE; 21	MEX; 6	POR; 4	ARG; 9	GRE; Ret	NZL	FIN	GER; 8	GBR; 10	FRA; Ret	ITA	ESP				12th	28
2013	Qatar World Rally Team	Ford Fiesta RS WRC	MON	SWE	MEX; 5	POR; 5	ARG	GRE; 5	ITA	FIN	GER; 13	AUS	FRA	ESP; Ret	GBR; WD				11th	30
2014	Nasser Al-Attiyah	Ford Fiesta RRC	MON	SWE	MEX	POR; 9		ITA; Ret	POL	FIN	GER; 17	AUS; 11	FRA	ESP; 10	GBR; 17				22nd	4
2014	Drive DMACK	Ford Fiesta RRC					ARG; 10												22nd	4
2015	Nasser Al-Attiyah	Ford Fiesta RRC	MON	SWE	MEX; 7	ARG	POR; 11	ITA; 12	POL; Ret	FIN		AUS; 10	FRA						16th	7
2015	Nasser Al-Attiyah	Škoda Fabia R5									GER; 17			ESP; 12	GBR				16th	7
2025	M-Sport Ford WRT	Ford Puma Rally1	MON	SWE	KEN	ESP	POR	ITA	GRE	EST	FIN	PAR	CHL	EUR	JPN	SAU; 15			NC	0

==== PWRC results ====
Year	Entrant	Car	1	2	3	4	5	6	7	8	PWRC	Points
2004	Nasser Al-Attiyah	Subaru Impreza WRX STi	SWE; 7	MEX; Ret	NZL; 7	ARG; 3	GER	FRA; 7	AUS; 5		7th	17
2005	Nasser Al-Attiyah	Subaru Impreza WRX STi	SWE	NZL; 4	CYP; 5	TUR; 3	ARG; 1	GBR; 3	JPN	AUS; 5	2nd	35
2006	QMMF	Subaru Impreza WRX Spec C	MON; 3	MEX; 2	ARG; 1	GRE; 1	JPN	CYP; 5	AUS	NZL; 7	1st	40
2007	QMMF	Subaru Impreza WRX Spec C	SWE; 7	MEX; Ret	ARG; Ret	GRE; 5	NZL	JPN	IRE; 3	GBR	9th	12
2008	QMMF	Subaru Impreza WRX STi	SWE; 17	ARG; Ret	GRE; Ret						NC	0
2008	QMMF	Subaru Impreza STi N14				TUR; 10	FIN	NZL	JPN	GBR; Ret	NC	0
2009	Autotek	Subaru Impreza STi N14	NOR	CYP; 3							3rd	31
2009	Barwa Rally Team	Subaru Impreza STi N14			POR; 4	ARG; 1	ITA; 1	GRE; DSQ	AUS	GBR; Ret	3rd	31

==== SWRC results ====
Year	Entrant	Car	1	2	3	4	5	6	7	8	9	10	SWRC	Points
2010	Barwa Rally Team	Škoda Fabia S2000	SWE	MEX; Ret	JOR; 4	NZL; 5							7th	34
2010	Barwa Rally Team	Ford Fiesta S2000					POR; 7	FIN; 7	GER	JPN	FRA	GBR	7th	34
2011	Barwa Rally Team	Ford Fiesta S2000	MEX; EX	JOR; Ret	ITA; 4	GRE; 6	FIN	GER; 2	FRA; Ret	ESP; 2			7th	56

==== WRC-2 Results ====
Year	Entrant	Car	1	2	3	4	5	6	7	8	9	10	11	12	13	WRC-2	Points
2014	Nasser Al-Attiyah	Ford Fiesta RRC	MON	SWE	MEX	POR; 1		ITA; Ret	POL	FIN	GER; 5	AUS; 1	FRA	ESP; 1	GBR; 6	1st	118
2014	Drive DMACK	Ford Fiesta RRC					ARG; 1									1st	118
2015	Nasser Al-Attiyah	Ford Fiesta RRC	MON	SWE	MEX; 1	ARG	POR; 1	ITA; 5	POL; Ret	FIN		AUS; 1	FRA			1st	112
2015	Nasser Al-Attiyah	Škoda Fabia R5									GER; 4			ESP; 3	GBR	1st	112

==== ERC results ====
Year	Entrant	Car	1	2	3	4	5	6	7	8	9	10	11	Pos.	Points
2014	Qatar World Rally Team	Ford Fiesta RRC	JÄN	LIE	GRE	IRE	AZO	YPR	EST	CZE	CYP; Ret	VAL	COR	NC	0
2017	Autotek Motorsport	Ford Fiesta R5	AZO	CAN	GRE; Ret	CYP; 1	POL	ZLI	RMC	LIE				8th	45
2018	Autotek Motorsport	Ford Fiesta R5	AZO	CAN	GRE	CYP; 4	RMC	ZLI	POL	LIE				23rd	16
2019	Autotek Motorsport	Volkswagen Polo GTI R5	AZO	CAN	LIE	POL	RMC	CZE	CYP; 1	HUN				8th	39

=== Dakar Rally results ===
Year	Class	Vehicle	Position	Stages won
2004	Car	(Japan) Mitsubishi	10th	0
2005	Car	(Germany) BMW	DNF	0
2006	Car	(Germany) BMW	DNF	0
2007	Car	(Germany) BMW	6th	1
2008	Event cancelled – replaced by the 2008 Central Europe Rally			
2009	Car	(Germany) BMW	DSQ	2
2010	Car	(Germany) Volkswagen	**2nd**	4
2011	Car	(Germany) Volkswagen	**1st**	4
2012	Car	(United States) Hummer	DNF	2
2013	Car	(United States) Demon Jefferies	DNF	3
2014	Car	(United Kingdom) Mini	**3rd**	2
2015	Car	(United Kingdom) Mini	**1st**	5
2016	Car	(United Kingdom) Mini	**2nd**	2
2017	Car	(Japan) Toyota	DNF	1
2018	Car	(Japan) Toyota	**2nd**	4
2019	Car	(Japan) Toyota	**1st**	3
2020	Car	(Japan) Toyota	**2nd**	1
2021	Car	(Japan) Toyota	**2nd**	6
2022	Car	(Japan) Toyota	**1st**	3
2023	Car	(Japan) Toyota	**1st**	3
2024	Car	(Bahrain) BRX	DNF	1
2025	Car	(Romania) Dacia	4th	1
2026	Car	(Romania) Dacia	**1st**	2

=== Complete World Touring Car Championship results ===
(key) (Races in bold indicate pole position) (Races in italics indicate fastest lap)

Year	Team	Car	1	2	3	4	5	6	7	8	9	10	11	12	13	14	15	16	17	18	19	20	21	22	23	24	DC	Points
2015	Campos Racing	Chevrolet RML Cruze TC1	ARG; 1	ARG; 2	MAR; 1	MAR; 2	HUN; 1	HUN; 2	GER; 1	GER; 2	RUS; 1	RUS; 2	SVK; 1	SVK; 2	FRA; 1	FRA; 2	POR; 1	POR; 2	JPN; 1	JPN; 2	CHN; 1	CHN; 2	THA; 1	THA; 2	QAT; 1; 16	QAT; 2; 14	NC	0

=== Complete World Rally-Raid Championship results ===
(key)

Year	Team	Car	Class	1	2	3	4	5	Pos.	Points
2022	Toyota Gazoo Racing	Toyota GR DKR Hilux	T1	DAK; 1	ABU; 11	MOR; 3	AND; 2		1st	169
2023	Toyota Gazoo Racing	Toyota GR DKR Hilux	T1+	DAK; 1	ABU; Ret	SON; 1	DES; 1	MOR; 15	1st	205
2024	Nasser Racing	Prodrive Hunter T1+	Ultimate	DAK; Ret	ABU; 1^{49}	PRT; 1^{45}	DES; 2^{44}		1st	202
2024	The Dacia Sandriders	Dacia Sandrider	Ultimate					MOR; 1^{46}	1st	202
2025	The Dacia Sandriders	Dacia Sandrider	Ultimate	DAK; 4^{48}	ABU; 1^{48}	ZAF; 10^{18}	PRT; 5^{26}	MOR; 15^{12}	2nd	152
2026	The Dacia Sandriders	Dacia Sandrider	Ultimate	DAK; 1^{73}	PRT; 38^{7}	DES; 3^{31}	MOR; 17^{4}	ABU	3rd*	115*

^{*}Season still in progress.

=== Complete Extreme E results ===
(key)

Year	Team	Car	1	2	3	4	5	6	7	8	9	10	Pos.	Points
2022	Abt Cupra XE	Spark ODYSSEY 21	DES; 8	ISL1; 9	ISL2; DSQ	COP; 3	ENE; 1						6th	46
2023	Abt Cupra XE	Spark ODYSSEY 21	DES; 1; 9	DES; 2; 4	HYD; 1; 10	HYD; 2; 8	ISL1; 1	ISL1; 2	ISL2; 1	ISL2; 2	COP; 1	COP; 2	16th	20

Sporting positions
Preceded by Mohammed bin Sulayem	Middle East Rally Championship; Champion; 2003	Succeeded by Khalid Al Qassimi
Preceded by Khalid Al Qassimi	Middle East Rally Championship; Champion; 2005–2009	Succeeded by Misfer Al-Marri
Preceded by Toshi Arai	Production World Rally Championship; Champion; 2006	Succeeded by Toshi Arai
Preceded by Carlos Sainz	Dakar Rally; Cars Winner; 2011	Succeeded by Stéphane Peterhansel
Preceded by Misfer Al-Marri	Middle East Rally Championship; Champion; 2011–2022	Succeeded by Incumbent
Preceded by Robert Kubica	World Rally Championship-2; Champion; 2014–2015	Succeeded by Esapekka Lappi
Preceded by Nani Roma	Dakar Rally; Cars Winner; 2015	Succeeded by Stéphane Peterhansel
Preceded by Carlos Sainz	Dakar Rally; Cars Winner; 2019	Succeeded by Carlos Sainz
Preceded by Stéphane Peterhansel	Dakar Rally; Cars Winner; 2022	Succeeded by Incumbent
Preceded by Inaugural	World Rally-Raid Championship; World Champion; 2022	Succeeded by Incumbent
Olympic Games
Preceded by Khaled Habash M. Al Suwaidi	Flagbearer for Qatar; Beijing 2008	Succeeded by Bahiya Mansour Al Hamad
