= Sergey Yakshin =

Kazakhstani sports shooter (born 1968)

Medal record

Men's shooting

Representing Kazakhstan

Asian Championships
Bronze medal – third place	2007 Kuwait City	Skeet team

Asian Shotgun Championships
Gold medal – first place	2009 Almaty	Skeet team
Bronze medal – third place	2009 Almaty	Skeet

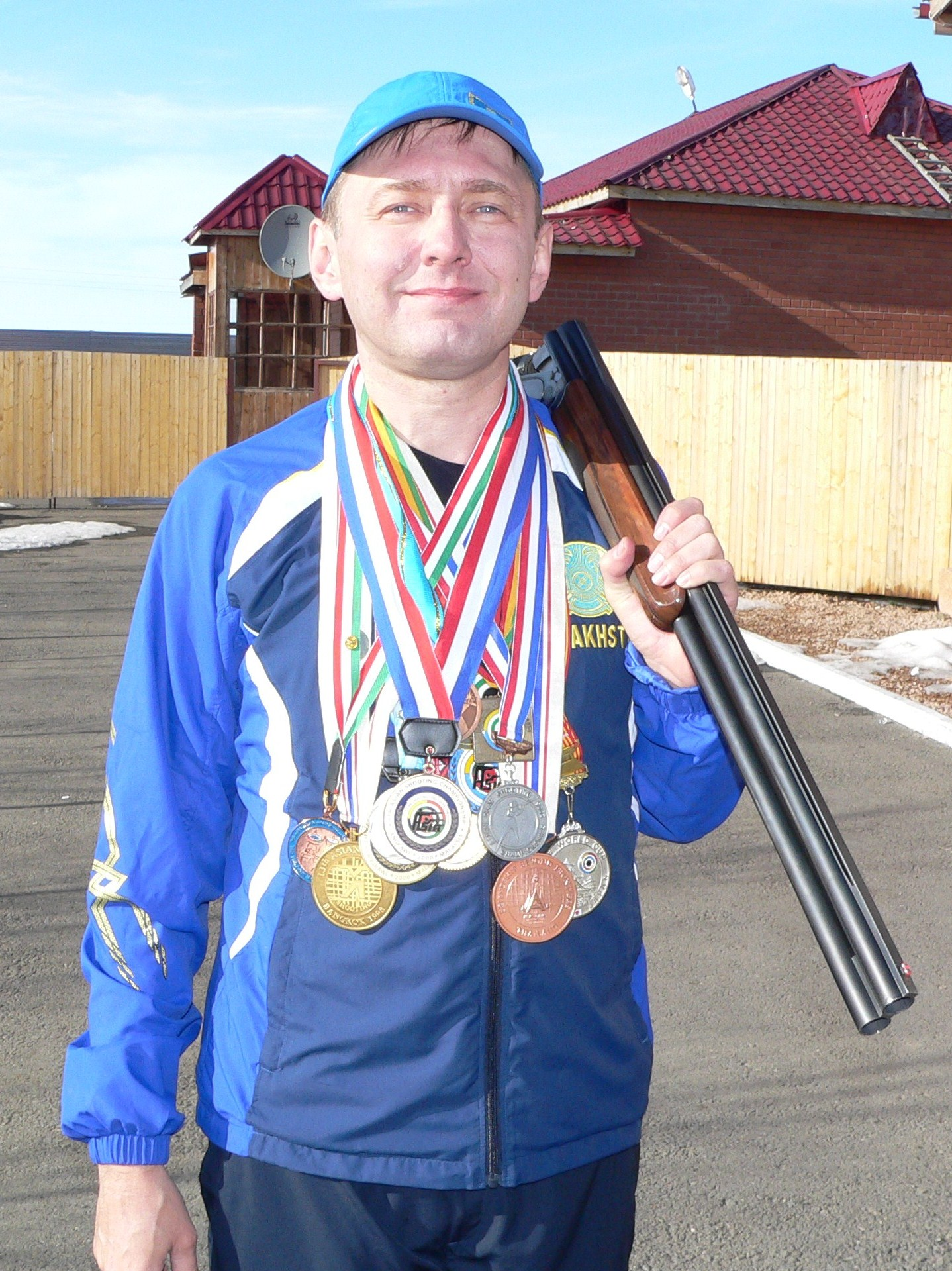

Sergey Yakshin (Сергей Александрович Якшин, born May 9, 1968 in Astana) is a Kazakhstani sport shooter. He competed at the 2000 Summer Olympics in the men's skeet event, in which he finished in 7th place.
