= Majed Al-Tamimi =

Saudi Arabian sport shooter

Majed Al-Tamimi (Arabic: ماجد التميمي; born August 21, 1971) is a Saudi Arabian sport shooter. At the 2012 Summer Olympics he competed in the Men's skeet, finishing in 29th place with a total of 111 points.
