= Saif Bin Futtais =

Emirati sport shooter

Medal record

Men's shooting

Representing United Arab Emirates

Asian Championships
Silver medal – second place	2015 Kuwait City	Skeet
Bronze medal – third place	2012 Doha	Skeet team
Bronze medal – third place	2015 Kuwait City	Skeet team

Asian Shotgun Championships
Gold medal – first place	2013 Almaty	Skeet
Gold medal – first place	2014 Al-Ain	Skeet
Gold medal – first place	2017 Astana	Skeet
Silver medal – second place	2011 Kuala Lumpur	Skeet
Silver medal – second place	2012 Patiala	Skeet
Silver medal – second place	2014 Al-Ain	Skeet team
Silver medal – second place	2018 Kuwait City	Skeet team
Silver medal – second place	2019 Almaty	Skeet
Bronze medal – third place	2009 Almaty	Skeet team

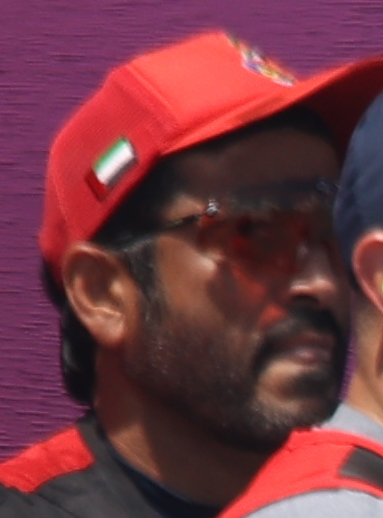
Saif Bin Futtais at the 2020 Summer Olympics

Saif bin Futtais Al-Mansoori (born September 2, 1973) is an Emirati sport shooter. He placed 29th in the men's skeet event at the 2016 Summer Olympics.
