= Saeed Al-Mutairi =

Saudi Arabian sports shooter (born 1968)

Personal information
- Full name: Saeed Al-Mutairi
- Nationality: Saudi Arabia
- Born: 24 September 1968 (age 57) Riyadh, Saudi Arabia
- Height: 1.72 m (5 ft 7 1/2 in)
- Weight: 65 kg (143 lb)

Sport
- Sport: Shooting
- Event: Skeet

Saeed Al-Mutairi (Arabic: سعيد بن مقبل المطيري; born September 24, 1968) is a Saudi Arabian sport shooter. Al-Mutairi made his official debut for the 1996 Summer Olympics in Atlanta, where he placed thirty-second in men's skeet shooting, with a hit of 117 targets, tying his position with five other shooters, including six-time Olympian and former silver medalist Eric Swinkels of the Netherlands. He managed to score 119 points for his category at the 2000 Summer Olympics in Sydney, and eventually achieved his best career result at the 2004 Summer Olympics in Athens, when he shot a total 120 targets in the qualifying rounds, finishing in seventeenth place.

At the 2008 Summer Olympics in Beijing, Al-Mutairi made his fourth appearance in men's skeet shooting. Unlike his three previous games, he struggled to attain a higher position in the qualifying rounds, shooting less than twenty-five clay targets in each of five successive attempts. Because of his poor performance and tough competition, Al-Mutairi finished only in thirty-ninth place at the end of two-day qualifying rounds, for a total score of 104 points.

At the 2020 Summer Olympics in Tokyo, Al-Mutairi made his fifth appearance in men's skeet shooting, but his final score of 119 was not enough to see him progress despite a second day of qualification that saw him claim a perfect score of 25 in the first round, and 23 in the second, for a total of 48 out of 50.
