= Asian Shooting Championships =

Shooting competition held every four years

The Asian Shooting Championships are governed by the Asian Shooting Confederation. Asian Shooting Championships began in 1967. These championships, including almost all ISSF shooting events, are held every four years.

== Asian Shooting Championships ==
#	Year	Venue	Date
1	1967	Tokyo, Japan	
2	1971	Seoul, South Korea	
3	1975	Kuala Lumpur, Malaysia	August 17–23, 1975
4	1980	Manila, Philippines	
5	1983	Jakarta, Indonesia	
6	1987	Beijing, China	
7	1991	Beijing, China	
8	1995	Jakarta, Indonesia	
9	2000	Langkawi, Malaysia	January 22–31, 2000
10	2004	Kuala Lumpur, Malaysia	February 6–19, 2004
11	2007	Kuwait City, Kuwait	December 3–13, 2007
12	2012	Doha, Qatar	January 11–22, 2012
13	2015	Kuwait City, Kuwait	November 1–12, 2015
14	2019	Doha, Qatar	November 3–14, 2019
15	2023	Changwon, South Korea	October 24 – November 1, 2023
16	2025	Shymkent, Kazakhstan	August 16–30, 2025

== Asian Airgun Championships ==
#	Year	Venue	Date
1	2005	Bangkok, Thailand	September 12–19, 2005
2	2008	Nanjing, China	April 4–9, 2008
3	2009	Doha, Qatar	December 16–22, 2009
4	2011	Kuwait City, Kuwait	October 17–23, 2011
5	2012	Nanchang, China	December 12–18, 2012
6	2013	Tehran, Iran	October 18–26, 2013
7	2014	Kuwait City, Kuwait	March 7–13, 2014
8	2015	New Delhi, India	September 25 – October 1, 2015
9	2016	Tehran, Iran	December 3–9, 2016
10	2017	Wako, Japan	December 6–12, 2017
11	2018	Kuwait City, Kuwait	November 2–12, 2018
12	2019	Taoyuan, Taiwan	March 25 – April 2, 2019
13	~~2020~~	~~TBD~~	Cancelled
14	2021	Shymkent, Kazakhstan	September 12–19, 2021
15	2022	Daegu, South Korea	November 9–19, 2022

== Asian Rifle/Pistol Championships ==
#	Year	Venue	Date
1	2024	Jakarta, Indonesia	January 8–17, 2024
2	2026	New Delhi, India	February 2–14, 2026

== Asian Shotgun Championships ==
Asian Clay Shooting Championships were first held in 1981. This kind of championship has been discontinued and new Asian Shotgun tournament starts in 2011.

Asian Clay Shooting Championships

#	Year	Venue	Date
1	1981	Nagoya, Japan	
2	1984	Singapore	
3	1986	Bangkok, Thailand	
4	1987	Hong Kong	
5	1989	Singapore	
6	1990	Seoul, South Korea	
7	1991	Fukuoka, Japan	
8	1992	Kuala Lumpur, Malaysia	
9	1993	Manila, Philippines	
10	1994	Bangkok, Thailand	
11	1995	Chengdu, China	
12	1996	Shanghai, China	
13	1997	Brunei	August 10–16, 1997
14	1999	Kuwait City, Kuwait	March 1–8, 1999
15	2000	Vigan, Philippines	June 1–10, 2000
16	2001	Bangkok, Thailand	
17	2002	Bangkok, Thailand	
18	2003	New Delhi, India	March 22–28, 2003
19	2004	Bangkok, Thailand	July 1–7, 2004
20	2005	Bangkok, Thailand	September 7–16, 2005
21	2006	Singapore	September 1–10, 2006
22	2007	Manila, Philippines	October 25–31, 2007
23	2008	Jaipur, India	February 21–29, 2008
24	2009	Almaty, Kazakhstan	September 24 – October 3, 2009
25	2010	Bangkok, Thailand	March 27 – April 6, 2010

Asian Shotgun Championships

#	Year	Venue	Date
1	2011	Kuala Lumpur, Malaysia	November 21 – December 1, 2011
2	2012	Patiala, India	November 28 – December 9, 2012
3	2013	Almaty, Kazakhstan	October 1–10, 2013
4	2014	Al-Ain, United Arab Emirates	November 1–10, 2014
5	~~2015~~	~~Tehran, Iran~~	Cancelled
6	2016	Abu Dhabi, United Arab Emirates	November 1–9, 2016
7	2017	Astana, Kazakhstan	August 3–14, 2017
8	2018	Kuwait City, Kuwait	November 2–12, 2018
9	2019	Almaty, Kazakhstan	September 20–30, 2019
10	2022	Almaty, Kazakhstan	July 30 – August 7, 2022
11	2024	Kuwait City, Kuwait	January 14–21, 2024
12	2026	Doha, Qatar	January 11–22, 2026
