= Shooting at the 2026 Asian Games =

- Venues: Aichi Prefectural Shooting Range
- Dates: 20 September – 1 October 2026
- Competitors: 431 from 32 nations

Shooting at the 2026 Asian Games was held between 20 September and 1 October 2026 at Aichi Prefectural Shooting Range. This is the sport's consecutive nineteenth appearance at the Games, since the 1954 edition.

== Schedule ==
The schedule is as follows:

●	1st day	●	Final day	Q	Qualification	F	Final

Date Event	September																					October	
Date Event	20 Sun		21 Mon		22 Tue		23 Wed		24 Thu		25 Fri		26 Sat		27 Sun	28 Mon		29 Tue		30 Wed		1 Thu	
Women's 10 m air rifle	Q	F	—N/a																				
Women's 10 m air rifle team	●		—N/a																				
Men's 10 m air rifle	—N/a		Q	F	—N/a																		
Men's 10 m air rifle team	—N/a		●		—N/a																		
Mixed 10 m air rifle team	—N/a				Q	F	—N/a																
Men's skeet	—N/a		Q				Q	F	—N/a														
Men's skeet team	—N/a		●				●		—N/a														
Women's skeet	—N/a		Q				Q	F	—N/a														
Women's skeet team	—N/a		●				●		—N/a														
Women's 10 m air pistol	—N/a						Q	F	—N/a														
Women's 10 m air pistol team	—N/a						●		—N/a														
Mixed skeet team	—N/a								Q	F	—N/a												
Men's 10 m air pistol	—N/a								Q	F	—N/a												
Men's 10 m air pistol team	—N/a								●		—N/a												
Men's 50 m rifle 3 positions	—N/a										Q	F	—N/a										
Men's 50 m rifle 3 positions team	—N/a										●		—N/a										
Mixed 10 m air pistol team	—N/a										Q	F	—N/a										
Women's 50 m rifle 3 positions	—N/a												Q	F	—N/a								
Women's 50 m rifle 3 positions team	—N/a												●		—N/a								
Women's 25 m pistol	—N/a														Q	Q	F	—N/a					
Women's 25 m pistol team	—N/a														●	●		—N/a					
Men's trap	—N/a														Q			Q	F	—N/a			
Men's trap team	—N/a														●			●		—N/a			
Women's trap	—N/a														Q			Q	F	—N/a			
Women's trap team	—N/a														●			●		—N/a			
Mixed trap team	—N/a																			Q	F	—N/a	
Men's 25 m air rapid fire pistol	—N/a																			Q		Q	F
Men's 25 m air rapid fire pistol team	—N/a																			●		●	

== Medal table ==
* Host nation (Japan)

Rank	Nation	Gold	Silver	Bronze	Total
1	China	16	8	4	28
2	India	3	8	4	15
3	South Korea	3	5	4	12
4	Qatar	2	2	0	4
5	Kuwait	2	1	2	5
6	Japan*	1	0	3	4
7	Uzbekistan	1	0	0	1
8	Kazakhstan	0	1	4	5
9	Chinese Taipei	0	1	2	3
10	Indonesia	0	1	1	2
11	Thailand	0	1	0	1
12	Iran	0	0	1	1
12	North Korea	0	0	1	1
12	Pakistan	0	0	1	1
12	Vietnam	0	0	1	1
Totals (15 entries)		28	28	28	84

== Medalists ==
=== Men ===
Individual

Event	Gold	Silver	Bronze
10 m air pistol	Vladimir Svechnikov; Uzbekistan	Hu Kai; China	Bu Shuaihang; China
25 m rapid fire pistol	Lee Gun-hyeok; South Korea	Su Lianbofan; China	Ghulam Mustafa Bashir; Pakistan
10 m air rifle	Sheng Lihao; China	Himanshu Dhillon; India	Rudrankksh Patil; India
50 m rifle 3 positions	Liu Yukun; China	Zhang Changhong; China	Islam Satpayev; Kazakhstan
Skeet	Rashid Saleh Al-Athba; Qatar	Lyu Jianlin; China	Lee Meng-yuan; Chinese Taipei
Trap	Khaled Al-Mudhaf; Kuwait	Yang Kun-pi; Chinese Taipei	Qi Ying; China

Team

Event	Gold	Silver	Bronze
10 m air pistol	China; Bu Shuaihang; Hu Kai; Xie Yu	Indonesia; Sukthanul Aulia Maruf; Muhamad Iqbal Raia Prabowo; Wira Sukmana	Japan; Masaki Iwasa; Seiji Morikawa; Junnosuke Nakayama
25 m rapid fire pistol	South Korea; Yoon Seo-yeong; Song Jong-ho; Lee Gun-hyeok	China; Su Lianbofan; He Shiyu; Yang Yuhao	Indonesia; Aris Febrianto; Dewa Putu Yadi Suteja; Muhamad Fawwaz Aditia Farrel
10 m air rifle	China; Zhang Changhong; Ma Sihan; Sheng Lihao	India; Rudrankksh Patil; Parth Mane; Himanshu Dhillon	South Korea; Shin Min-ki; Gwon Hyeop-jun; Park Ha-jun
50 m rifle 3 positions	China; Zhang Changhong; Liu Yukun; Sheng Lihao	India; Niraj Kumar; Rudrankksh Patil; Aishwary Pratap Singh Tomar	South Korea; Gwon Hyeop-jun; Joung Seung-woo; Park Sung-hyun
Skeet	Qatar; Nasser Al-Attiyah; Rashid Saleh Al-Athba; Ali Ahmed Al-Ishaq	Kuwait; Mohammad Al-Awaad; Mohammad Al-Daihani; Abdullah Al-Rashidi	India; Bhavtegh Singh Gill; Anantjeet Singh Naruka; Mairaj Ahmad Khan
Trap	Kuwait; Talal Al-Rashidi; Khaled Al-Mudhaf; Abdulrahman Al-Faihan	Qatar; Saeed Abu Sharib; Mohammed Al-Rumaihi; Angelo Scalzone	Kazakhstan; Mark Pochivalov; Alisher Aisalbayev; Daniil Pochivalov

=== Women ===
Individual

Event	Gold	Silver	Bronze
10 m air pistol	Choo Ga-eun; South Korea	Shen Yiyao; China	Jiang Ranxin; China
25 m pistol	Xiao Jiaruixuan; China	Esha Singh; India	Kim Hyon-suk; North Korea
10 m air rifle	Hinata Taichi; Japan	Elavenil Valarivan; India	Ban Hyo-jin; South Korea
50 m rifle 3 positions	Han Jiayu; China	Zhang Liyuan; China	Kim Ji-eun; South Korea
Skeet	Jiang Yiting; China	Isarapa Imprasertsuk; Thailand	Assem Orynbay; Kazakhstan
Trap	Neeru Dhanda; India	Sun Yunong; China	Hajar Abdulmalik; Kuwait

Team

Event	Gold	Silver	Bronze
10 m air pistol	China; Yao Qianxun; Jiang Ranxin; Shen Yiyao	South Korea; Choo Ga-eun; Kim Bo-mi; Oh Ye-jin	Vietnam; Bùi Thúy Thu Thủy; Trịnh Thu Vinh; Nguyễn Thùy Trang
25 m pistol	China; Yao Qianxun; Xiao Jiaruixuan; Shang Kaiyan	South Korea; Bong Seo-rin; Yang Ji-in; Oh Ye-jin	Chinese Taipei; Cheng Yen-ching; Tien Chia-chen; Chen Yu-ju
10 m air rifle	China; Wang Zifei; Du Yuchen; Han Jiayu	India; Elavenil Valarivan; Vidarsa Kochalumkal Vinod; Sonam Uttam Maskar	Japan; Hinata Taichi; Misaki Nobata; Shiori Hirata
50 m rifle 3 positions	China; Wang Zifei; Zhang Liyuan; Han Jiayu	India; Ashi Chouksey; Tilottama Sen; Vidarsa Vinod	Kazakhstan; Sofiya Shulzhenko; Arina Malinovskaya; Yelizaveta Bezrukova
Skeet	China; Che Yufei; Jiang Yiting; Jiang Chaoyu	Kazakhstan; Zoya Piskun; Assem Orynbay; Adel Sadakbayeva	India; Parinaaz Dhaliwal; Maheshwari Chauhan; Raiza Dhillon
Trap	China; Liu Shanshan; Sun Yunong; Zhu Jingyu	India; Aashima Ahlawat; Neeru Dhanda; Manisha Keer	Kuwait; Shahad Al-Hawal; Hajar Abdulmalik; Sarah Al-Hawal

=== Mixed team ===
Event	Gold	Silver	Bronze
10 m air pistol	India; Suruchi Singh; Kamaljeet	South Korea; Choo Gae-un; Hong Su-hyeon	Iran; Hanieh Rostamian; Vahid Golkhandan
10 m air rifle	China; Wang Zifei; Sheng Lihao	South Korea; Ban Hyo-jin; Park Ha-jun	Japan; Naoki Hanakawa; Misaki Nobata
Skeet	China; Jiang Yiting; Lyu Jianlin	South Korea; Jang Kook-hee; Lee Jong-jun	India; Parinaaz Dhaliwal; Anantjeet Singh Naruka
Trap	India; Neeru Dhanda; Kynan Chenai	Qatar; Ray Bassil; Mohammed Al-Rumaihi	China; Sun Yunong; Qi Ying

== Participating nations ==
- Bahrain (7)
- Bangladesh (12)
- China (30)
- Hong Kong (2)
- India (30)
- Indonesia (26)
- Iran (14)
- Japan (30) (host)
- Kazakhstan (30)
- Kuwait (12)
- Kyrgyzstan (6)
- Lebanon (4)
- Malaysia (7)
- Maldives (12)
- Mongolia (14)
- North Korea (6)
- Oman (8)
- Pakistan (9)
- Palestine (3)
- Philippines (11)
- Qatar (24)
- Saudi Arabia (7)
- Singapore (3)
- South Korea (30)
- Syria (2)
- Chinese Taipei (18)
- Tajikistan (7)
- Thailand (24)
- United Arab Emirates (14)
- Uzbekistan (12)
- Vietnam (15)
- Yemen (2)
