= Shooting at the 2022 Asian Games – Women's skeet =

Women's skeet at the 2022 Asian Games
- Venue: Fuyang Yinhu Sports Centre
- Dates: 26–27 September 2023
- Competitors: 23 from 8 nations

Medalists
gold medal	Jiang Yiting	China
silver medal	Gao Jinmei	China
bronze medal	Assem Orynbay	Kazakhstan

The women's skeet competition at the 2022 Asian Games in Hangzhou, China was held on 26 and 27 September 2023 at Fuyang Yinhu Sports Centre.

== Schedule ==
All times are China Standard Time (UTC+08:00)

Date	Time	Event
Tuesday, 26 September 2023	09:00	Qualification day 1
Wednesday, 27 September 2023	09:00	Qualification day 2
Wednesday, 27 September 2023	14:30	Final

== Records ==
Prior to this competition, the existing world, Asian and Games records were as follows.

Qualification
World Record	Francisca Crovetto (CHI)	125	Lonato, Italy	27 April 2022
Asian Record	Wei Meng (CHN)	124	Doha, Qatar	10 November 2019
Games Record	Zhang Donglian (CHN)	121	Palembang, Indonesia	26 August 2018
Final
World Record	Wei Meng (CHN)	59	Al-Ain, United Arab Emirates	12 October 2019
Asian Record	Wei Meng (CHN)	59	Al-Ain, United Arab Emirates	12 October 2019
Games Record	Sutiya Jiewchaloemmit (THA)	55	Palembang, Indonesia	26 August 2018

== Results ==
=== Qualification ===
Rank	Athlete	Day 1			Day 2		Total	S-off	Notes
Rank	Athlete	1	2	3	4	5	Total	S-off	Notes
1	Jiang Yiting (CHN)	24	24	25	25	25	123		GR
2	Assem Orynbay (KAZ)	23	24	23	24	25	119		
3	Sutiya Jiewchaloemmit (THA)	24	25	21	24	24	118		
4	Olga Panarina (KAZ)	24	23	24	23	23	117		
5	Gao Jinmei (CHN)	25	24	24	23	20	116		
6	Reem Al-Sharshani (QAT)	22	24	22	23	24	115		
7	Isarapa Imprasertsuk (THA)	21	24	22	23	24	114		
8	Darshna Rathore (IND)	24	23	22	22	23	114		
9	Zoya Kravchenko (KAZ)	23	23	24	22	22	114		
10	Eman Al-Shamaa (KUW)	23	20	22	23	25	113		
11	Parinaaz Dhaliwal (IND)	23	24	20	23	23	113		
12	Maryam Al-Asam (BRN)	23	23	22	22	23	113		
13	Sarah Ghulam Mohammed (QAT)	21	23	23	22	23	112		
14	Jang Kook-hee (KOR)	19	22	22	24	24	111		
15	Nutchaya Sutarporn (THA)	23	23	22	19	23	110		
16	An Il-ji (KOR)	21	23	21	24	21	110		
17	Ganemat Sekhon (IND)	22	21	22	23	21	109		
18	Huang Sixue (CHN)	23	20	23	22	21	109		
19	Afrah Bin Hussain (KUW)	21	23	20	22	22	108		
20	Maryam Hassani (BRN)	20	19	22	23	23	107		
21	Hajar Ghulam Mohammed (QAT)	22	20	20	24	21	107		
22	Latifa Al-Najem (BRN)	21	22	16	23	21	103		
23	Fatema Al-Zaabi (KUW)	22	19	19	18	17	95		

=== Final ===
Rank	Athlete	Elimination						S-off	Notes
Rank	Athlete	1	2	3	4	5	6	S-off	Notes
1st place, gold medalist(s)	Jiang Yiting (CHN)	10	20	28	37	47	57		GR
2nd place, silver medalist(s)	Gao Jinmei (CHN)	10	20	29	36	46	55		
3rd place, bronze medalist(s)	Assem Orynbay (KAZ)	8	18	27	36	45			
4	Olga Panarina (KAZ)	9	19	28	34				
5	Reem Al-Sharshani (QAT)	8	18	27					
6	Sutiya Jiewchaloemmit (THA)	10	17						
