= Shooting at the 2022 Asian Games – Women's skeet team =

Women's skeet team at the 2022 Asian Games
- Venue: Fuyang Yinhu Sports Centre
- Dates: 26–27 September 2023
- Competitors: 21 from 7 nations

Medalists
gold medal	Kazakhstan; Zoya Kravchenko, Assem Orynbay, Olga Panarina
silver medal	China; Gao Jinmei, Huang Sixue, Jiang Yiting
bronze medal	Thailand; Isarapa Imprasertsuk, Sutiya Jiewchaloemmit, Nutchaya Sutarporn

The women's skeet team competition at the 2022 Asian Games in Hangzhou, China was held on 26 and 27 September 2023 at Fuyang Yinhu Sports Centre.

== Schedule ==
All times are China Standard Time (UTC+08:00)

Date	Time	Event
Tuesday, 26 September 2023	09:00	Day 1
Wednesday, 27 September 2023	09:00	Day 2

== Records ==
Prior to this competition, the existing world, Asian and Games records were as follows.

World Record	United States	365	Baku, Azerbaijan	18 August 2023
Asian Record	China	363	Doha, Qatar	10 November 2019
Games Record	—	—	—	—

== Results ==
Rank	Team	Day 1			Day 2		Total	Notes
Rank	Team	1	2	3	4	5	Total	Notes
1st place, gold medalist(s)	Kazakhstan (KAZ)	70	70	71	69	70	350	GR
	Zoya Kravchenko	23	23	24	22	22	114	
	Assem Orynbay	23	24	23	24	25	119	
	Olga Panarina	24	23	24	23	23	117	
2nd place, silver medalist(s)	China (CHN)	72	68	72	70	66	348	
	Gao Jinmei	25	24	24	23	20	116	
	Huang Sixue	23	20	23	22	21	109	
	Jiang Yiting	24	24	25	25	25	123	
3rd place, bronze medalist(s)	Thailand (THA)	68	72	65	66	71	342	
	Isarapa Imprasertsuk	21	24	22	23	24	114	
	Sutiya Jiewchaloemmit	24	25	21	24	24	118	
	Nutchaya Sutarporn	23	23	22	19	23	110	
4	India (IND)	69	68	64	68	67	336	
	Parinaaz Dhaliwal	23	24	20	23	23	113	
	Darshna Rathore	24	23	22	22	23	114	
	Ganemat Sekhon	22	21	22	23	21	109	
5	Qatar (QAT)	65	67	65	69	68	334	
	Reem Al-Sharshani	22	24	22	23	24	115	
	Hajar Ghulam Mohammed	22	20	20	24	21	107	
	Sarah Ghulam Mohammed	21	23	23	22	23	112	
6	Bahrain (BRN)	64	64	60	68	67	323	
	Maryam Al-Asam	23	23	22	22	23	113	
	Latifa Al-Najem	21	22	16	23	21	103	
	Maryam Hassani	20	19	22	23	23	107	
7	Kuwait (KUW)	66	62	61	63	64	316	
	Eman Al-Shamaa	23	20	22	23	25	113	
	Fatema Al-Zaabi	22	19	19	18	17	95	
	Afrah Bin Hussain	21	23	20	22	22	108	
