= 2022 Asian Shotgun Championships =

- Host city: Almaty, Kazakhstan
- Dates: 30 July – 7 August 2022
- Main venue: Asanov Shooting Club

The 2022 Asian Shotgun Championships was the 10th Asian Shotgun Championships which took place from 30 July to 7 August 2022, at Asanov Shooting Club, Almaty, Kazakhstan.

== Medal summary ==
=== Men ===
Event	Gold	Silver	Bronze
Trap	Naser Al-Meqlad; Kuwait	Rashid Hamad Al-Athba; Qatar	Yu Haicheng; China
Trap team	China; Guo Yuhao; Qi Ying; Yu Haicheng	Kuwait; Abdulrahman Al-Faihan; Naser Al-Meqlad; Talal Al-Rashidi	Saudi Arabia; Faisal Al-Dajani; Fahad Al-Mutairi; Mohammed Al-Shrideh
Skeet	Abdulaziz Al-Saad; Kuwait	Alexandr Yechshenko; Kazakhstan	Eduard Yechshenko; Kazakhstan
Skeet team	Qatar; Masoud Saleh Al-Athba; Rashid Saleh Al-Athba; Abdulaziz Al-Attiyah	Kuwait; Abdullah Al-Rashidi; Mansour Al-Rashidi; Abdulaziz Al-Saad	Kazakhstan; David Pochivalov; Alexandr Yechshenko; Eduard Yechshenko

=== Women ===
Event	Gold	Silver	Bronze
Trap	Sarah Al-Hawal; Kuwait	Wu Cuicui; China	Sarsenkul Rysbekova; Kazakhstan
Trap team	China; Wang Xiaojing; Wang Xinyi; Wu Cuicui	Kuwait; Hajar Abdulmalik; Sarah Al-Hawal; Shahad Al-Hawal	Kazakhstan; Mariya Dmitriyenko; Aizhan Dosmagambetova; Sarsenkul Rysbekova
Skeet	Zoya Kravchenko; Kazakhstan	Wei Ning; China	Assem Orynbay; Kazakhstan
Skeet team	Kazakhstan; Anastassiya Molchanova; Assem Orynbay; Zoya Kravchenko	Thailand; Isarapa Imprasertsuk; Sutiya Jiewchaloemmit; Nutchaya Sutarporn	China; Che Yufei; Huang Sixue; Wei Ning

=== Mixed ===
Event	Gold	Silver	Bronze
Trap team	Kuwait; Talal Al-Rashidi; Sarah Al-Hawal	Kazakhstan; Viktor Khassyanov; Mariya Dmitriyenko	China; Yu Haicheng; Wang Xiaojing
Trap team	Kuwait; Talal Al-Rashidi; Sarah Al-Hawal	Kazakhstan; Viktor Khassyanov; Mariya Dmitriyenko	China; Qi Ying; Wu Cuicui
Skeet team	China; Yu Ziqing; Jiang Yiting	China; Dun Yueheng; Wei Ning	Kuwait; Abdullah Al-Rashidi; Eman Al-Shamaa
Skeet team	China; Yu Ziqing; Jiang Yiting	China; Dun Yueheng; Wei Ning	Kazakhstan; Alexandr Yechshenko; Anastassiya Molchanova

== Medal table ==
Rank	Nation	Gold	Silver	Bronze	Total
1	Kuwait	4	3	1	8
2	China	3	3	4	10
3	Kazakhstan	2	2	6	10
4	Qatar	1	1	0	2
5	Thailand	0	1	0	1
6	Saudi Arabia	0	0	1	1
Totals (6 entries)		10	10	12	32
