= List of Asian Games records in shooting =

This is the list of Asian Games records in shooting, current after the 2026 Asian Games.

== Men ==
=== Pistol ===
Event	Score	Athlete	Nation	Games	Date
10 metre air pistol
Qualification	590	Tan Zongliang	China	2002 Busan	3 October 2002
Final	244.3	Vladimir Svechnikov	Uzbekistan	2026 Aichi–Nagoya	24 September 2026
Team	1750	Tan Zongliang; Wang Yifu; Xu Dan	China	2002 Busan	3 October 2002
25 metre center fire pistol
Individual	590	Jaspal Rana	India	2006 Doha	8 December 2006
Team	1749	Kim Hyon-ung; Kim Jong-su; Ryu Myong-yon	North Korea	1998 Bangkok	13 December 1998
Team	1749	Kim Sung-jun; Lee Sang-hak; Park Byung-taek	South Korea	1998 Bangkok	13 December 1998
25 metre rapid fire pistol
Qualification	592	Su Lianbofan	China	2026 Aichi–Nagoya	1 October 2026
Final	32	Lee Gun-hyeok	South Korea	2026 Aichi–Nagoya	1 October 2026
Final	32	Su Lianbofan	China	2026 Aichi–Nagoya	1 October 2026
Team	1765	Li Yuehong; Liu Yangpan; Wang Xinjie	China	2022 Hangzhou	25 September 2023
25 metre standard pistol
Individual	579	Opas Ruengpanyawut	Thailand	2002 Busan	8 October 2002
Team	1724	Jin Yongde; Liu Guohui; Liu Yadong	China	2002 Busan	8 October 2002
50 metre pistol
Individual	571	Wang Yifu	China	2002 Busan	2 October 2002
Team	1692	Pang Wei; Pu Qifeng; Wang Zhiwei	China	2014 Incheon	20 September 2014

=== Rifle ===
Event	Score	Athlete	Nation	Games	Date
10 metre air rifle
Qualification	635.4	Sheng Lihao	China	2026 Aichi–Nagoya	21 September 2026
Final	254.2	Sheng Lihao	China	2026 Aichi–Nagoya	21 September 2026
Team	1899.0	Ma Sihan; Sheng Lihao; Zhang Changhong	China	2026 Aichi–Nagoya	21 September 2026
50 metre rifle prone
Individual	626.2	Zhao Shengbo	China	2014 Incheon	25 September 2014
Team	1876.0	Lan Xing; Liu Gang; Zhao Shengbo	China	2014 Incheon	25 September 2014
50 metre rifle three positions
Qualification	593	Zhang Changhong	China	2026 Aichi–Nagoya	25 September 2026
Final	360.5	Liu Yukun	China	2026 Aichi–Nagoya	25 September 2026
Team	1769	Swapnil Kusale; Akhil Sheoran; Aishwary Pratap Singh Tomar	India	2022 Hangzhou	29 September 2023

=== Running target ===
Event	Score	Athlete	Nation	Games	Date
10 metre running target
Individual	590	Zhai Yujia	China	2010 Guangzhou	16 November 2010
Team	1720	Niu Zhiyuan; Yang Ling; Zeng Guobin	China	2002 Busan	4 October 2002
10 metre running target mixed
Individual	389	Gan Lin	China	2006 Doha	6 December 2006
Team	1141	Jo Yong-chol; Kim Ji-song; Pak Myong-won	North Korea	2010 Guangzhou	17 November 2010

=== Shotgun ===
Event	Score	Athlete	Nation	Games	Date
Trap
Qualification	123	Fahad Al-Deehani	Kuwait	1994 Hiroshima	8 October 1994
Final	26	Khaled Al-Mudhaf	Kuwait	2026 Aichi–Nagoya	29 September 2026
Team	357	Fahad Al-Deehani; Fehaid Al-Deehani; Khalaf Al-Otaibi	Kuwait	1994 Hiroshima	8 October 1994
Double trap
Individual	142	Fehaid Al-Deehani	Kuwait	2014 Incheon	25 September 2014
Team	404	Hu Binyuan; Li Jun; Mo Junjie	China	2014 Incheon	25 September 2014
Team	404	Ahmad Al-Afasi; Hamad Al-Afasi; Fehaid Al-Deehani	Kuwait	2014 Incheon	25 September 2014
Team	404	Masoud Hamad Al-Athba; Rashid Hamad Al-Athba; Hamad Al-Marri	Qatar	2014 Incheon	25 September 2014
Skeet
Qualification	124	Vladislav Mukhamediyev	Kazakhstan	2018 Jakarta–Palembang	26 August 2018
Final	34	Rashid Saleh Al-Athba	Qatar	2026 Aichi–Nagoya	23 September 2026
Team	366	Jin Di; Xu Ying; Zhang Fan	China	2014 Incheon	30 September 2014

== Women ==
=== Pistol ===
Event	Score	Athlete	Nation	Games	Date
10 metre air pistol
Qualification	582	Choo Ga-eun	South Korea	2026 Aichi–Nagoya	23 September 2026
Final	246.3	Choo Ga-eun	South Korea	2026 Aichi–Nagoya	23 September 2026
Team	1736	Jiang Ranxin; Li Xue; Zhao Nan	China	2022 Hangzhou	29 September 2023
25 metre pistol
Qualification	593	Manu Bhaker	India	2018 Jakarta–Palembang	22 August 2018
Final	38	Liu Rui	China	2022 Hangzhou	27 September 2023
Final	38	Xiao Jiaruixuan	China	2026 Aichi–Nagoya	28 September 2026
Final	38	Esha Singh	India	2026 Aichi–Nagoya	28 September 2026
Team	1768	Chen Ying; Li Duihong; Tao Luna	China	2002 Busan	4 October 2002

=== Rifle ===
Event	Score	Athlete	Nation	Games	Date	Ref
10 metre air rifle
Qualification	636.8	Wang Zifei	China	2026 Aichi–Nagoya	20 September 2026	
Final	253	Hinata Taichi	Japan	2026 Aichi–Nagoya	20 September 2026	
Team	1904.2	Wang Zifei; Han Jiayu; Du Yuchen	China	2026 Aichi–Nagoya	20 September 2026	
50 metre rifle prone
Individual	624.1	Chuluunbadrakhyn Narantuyaa	Mongolia	2014 Incheon	24 September 2014	
Team	1855.5	Eum Bit-na; Jeong Mi-ra; Na Yoon-kyung	South Korea	2014 Incheon	24 September 2014	
50 metre rifle three positions
Qualification	594	Xia Siyu	China	2022 Hangzhou	27 September 2023	
Qualification	594	Sift Kaur Samra	India	2022 Hangzhou	27 September 2023	
Qualification	594	Han Jiayu	China	2026 Aichi–Nagoya	26 September 2026	
Final	359.0	Han Jiayu	China	2026 Aichi–Nagoya	26 September 2026	
Team	1773	Han Jiayu; Xia Siyu; Zhang Qiongyue	China	2022 Hangzhou	27 September 2023	
Team	1773	Zhang Liyuan; Wang Zifei; Han Jiayu	China	2026 Aichi–Nagoya	26 September 2026	

=== Running target ===
Event	Score	Athlete	Nation	Games	Date
10 metre running target
Individual	560	Zukhra Irnazarova	Kazakhstan	2022 Hangzhou	28 September 2023
Team	1148	Paek Ok-sim; Pang Myong-hyang; Ri Ji-ye	North Korea	2022 Hangzhou	28 September 2023

=== Shotgun ===
Event	Score	Athlete	Nation	Games	Date
Trap
Qualification	124	Wu Cuicui	China	2022 Hangzhou	1 October 2023
Final	28	Neeru Dhanda	India	2026 Aichi–Nagoya	29 September 2026
Team	357	Li Qingnian; Wu Cuicui; Zhang Xinqiu	China	2022 Hangzhou	1 October 2023
Double trap
Individual	136	Li Qingnian	China	2018 Jakarta–Palembang	23 August 2018
Skeet
Qualification	123	Jiang Yiting	China	2022 Hangzhou	27 September 2023
Final	35	Jiang Yiting	China	2026 Aichi–Nagoya	23 September 2026
Team	357	Che Yufei; Jiang Chaoyu; Jiang Yiting	China	2026 Aichi–Nagoya	23 September 2026

== Mixed ==
=== Pistol ===
Event	Score	Athlete	Nation	Games	Date
10 metre air pistol
Qualification	587	Suruchi Singh; Kamaljeet	India	2026 Aichi–Nagoya	25 September 2026
Final	484.6	Suruchi Singh; Kamaljeet	India	2026 Aichi–Nagoya	25 September 2026

=== Rifle ===
Event	Score	Athlete	Nation	Games	Date
10 metre air rifle
Qualification	638.9	Sheng Lihao; Wang Zifei	China	2026 Aichi–Nagoya	22 September 2026
Final	507.1	Sheng Lihao; Wang Zifei	China	2026 Aichi–Nagoya	22 September 2026

=== Shotgun ===
Event	Score	Athlete	Nation	Games	Date
Trap
Qualification	142	Qi Ying; Sun Yunong	China	2026 Aichi–Nagoya	30 September 2026
Final	34	Kynan Chenai; Neeru Dhanda	India	2026 Aichi–Nagoya	30 September 2026
Skeet
Qualification	149	Abdullah Al-Rashidi; Eman Al-Shamaa	Kuwait	2022 Hangzhou	28 September 2023
Final	52	Jiang Yiting; Lyu Jianlin	China	2026 Aichi–Nagoya	24 September 2026
