= Shooting at the 2026 Asian Games – Women's skeet =

Women's skeet at the 2026 Asian Games
- Venue: Aichi Pref. General Shooting Gallery
- Dates: 23 September 2026
- Competitors: 26 from 11 nations

Medalists
gold medal	Jiang Yiting	China
silver medal	Isarapa Imprasertsuk	Thailand
bronze medal	Assem Orynbay	Kazakhstan

The women's skeet competition at the 2026 Asian Games in Aichi Prefecture, Japan was held on 23 September 2026 at the Aichi Pref. General Shooting Gallery.

== Schedule ==
All times are Japan Standard Time (UTC+09:00)

Date	Time	Event
Monday, 21 September 2026	10:00	Qualification day 1
Tuesday, 22 September 2026	10:00	Qualification day 2
Wednesday, 23 September 2026	10:00	Qualification day 3
Wednesday, 23 September 2026	16:00	Final

== Records ==
Prior to this competition, the existing world, Asian and Games records were as follows.

Qualification
World Record	Francisca Crovetto (CHI)	125	Lonato, Italy	27 April 2022
Asian Record	Wei Meng (CHN)	124	Doha, Qatar	10 November 2019
Games Record	Jiang Yiting (CHN)	123	Hangzhou, China	27 September 2023
Final
World Record	Sara Bongini (ITA)	35	Lonato del Garda, Italy	7 July 2026
Asian Record	Adel Sadakbayeva (KAZ)	33	Doha, Qatar	15 January 2026
Games Record				

== Results ==
=== Qualification ===
Rank	Athlete	Qualification					Total	S-off	Notes
Rank	Athlete	1	2	3	4	5	Total	S-off	Notes
1	Che Yufei (CHN)	24	25	23	25	25	122		Q
2	Jiang Yiting (CHN)	23	25	24	24	22	118		Q
3	Jiang Chaoyu (CHN)	21	25	23	25	23	117		
4	Assem Orynbay (KAZ)	23	24	25	24	21	117		Q
5	Isarapa Imprasertsuk (THA)	23	24	20	24	23	114		Q
6	Zoya Piskun (KAZ)	25	22	22	22	22	113		Q
7	Jang Kook-hee (KOR)	21	25	19	25	22	112		Q
8	Raiza Dhillon (IND)	25	21	22	24	19	111	+11	Q
9	Parinaaz Dhaliwal (IND)	23	21	21	24	22	111	+10	Q
10	Reem Al-Sharshani (QAT)	24	21	22	22	22	111	+2	
11	Yuka Kojima (JPN)	21	21	23	23	22	110		
12	Maheshwari Chauhan (IND)	19	23	21	22	24	109		
13	Rika Kaiga (JPN)	23	22	21	21	22	109		
14	Eman Al-Shamaa (KUW)	21	22	22	21	22	108		
15	Kim Chae-eun (KOR)	22	20	24	18	23	107		
16	Fatema Al-Zaabi (KUW)	22	24	18	19	23	106		
17	Adel Sadakbayeva (KAZ)	22	22	21	22	19	106		
18	An Il-ji (KOR)	21	21	22	19	22	105		
19	Yemina Natalia Sinaga (INA)	21	20	21	23	20	105		
20	Maryam Hassani (BRN)	21	20	20	21	22	104		
21	Hajar Ghulam Mohammed (QAT)	20	22	20	19	21	102		
22	Mirano Suzuki (JPN)	22	22	19	18	21	102		
23	Sarah Ghulam Mohammed (QAT)	18	20	19	22	22	101		
24	Lo Chien-Ya (TPE)	18	22	17	22	20	99		
25	Maryam Al-Asam (BRN)	17	18	20	22	20	97		
26	Afrah Al-Mohammad (KUW)	18	21	17	21	19	96		

=== Final ===
Rank	Athlete	Nation	Series									Total	S-off	Notes
Rank	Athlete	Nation	1	2	3	4	5	6	7	8	9	Total	S-off	Notes
1st place, gold medalist(s)	Jiang Yiting	China	4	4	4	3	4	4	4	4	4	35		
2nd place, silver medalist(s)	Isarapa Imprasertsuk	Thailand	3	4	4	4	4	3	4	3	2	31		
3rd place, bronze medalist(s)	Assem Orynbay	Kazakhstan	3	4	3	4	4	3	4	3		28		
4	Raiza Dhillon	India	3	3	4	4	3	3	3			23		
5	Jang Kook-hee	South Korea	4	4	2	3	2	4				19		
6	Zoya Piskun	Kazakhstan	3	3	4	3	3	2				18		
7	Che Yufei	China	4	1	4							9		
8	Parinaaz Dhaliwal	India	2	4	2							8		
