= Shooting at the 2026 Asian Games – Mixed skeet team =

Mixed skeet team at the 2026 Asian Games
- Venue: Aichi Pref. General Shooting Gallery
- Dates: 24 September 2026
- Competitors: 22 from 11 nations

Medalists
gold medal	Jiang Yiting; Lyu Jianlin	China
silver medal	Jang Kook-hee; Lee Jong-jun	South Korea
bronze medal	Parinaaz Dhaliwal; Anant Jeet Singh Naruka	India

The mixed skeet team competition at the 2026 Asian Games in Aichi Prefecture, Japan was held on 24 September 2026 at the Aichi Pref. General Shooting Gallery.

== Schedule ==
All times are Japan Standard Time (UTC+09:00)

Date	Time	Event
Thursday, 24 September 2026	10:00	Qualification
Thursday, 24 September 2026	14:45	Final

== Records ==
Prior to this competition, the existing world, Asian and Games records were as follows.

World Record	United States	149	Baku, Azerbaijan	20 August 2023
Asian Record	Kuwait	149	Hangzhou, China	28 September 2023
Games Record	Kuwait	149	Hangzhou, China	28 September 2023

== Results ==
=== Qualification ===
Rank	Team	Round			Total	Notes
Rank	Team	1	2	3	Total	Notes
1	Qatar (QAT)	50	47	48	145	AR
	Rashid Saleh Al-Athba	25	24	24	73	
	Reem Al-Sharshani	25	23	24	72	
2	South Korea (KOR)	49	45	49	143	
	Lee Jong-jun	25	22	25	72	
	Jang Kook-hee	24	23	24	71	
3	China (CHN)	48	44	48	140	
	Lyu Jianlin	24	23	25	72	
	Jiang Yiting	24	21	23	68	
4	India (IND)	44	47	47	138	
	Anant Jeet Singh Naruka	22	24	24	70	
	Parinaaz Dhaliwal	22	23	23	68	
5	Kuwait (KUW)	48	48	41	137	
	Abdullah Al-Rashidi	25	24	21	70	
	Eman Al-Shamaa	23	24	20	67	
6	Kazakhstan (KAZ)	43	44	47	134	
	Alexandr Mukhamediyev	22	21	25	68	
	Assem Orynbay	21	23	22	66	
7	Japan (JPN)	46	45	41	132	
	Shotaro Toguchi	24	24	20	68	
	Yuka Kojima	22	21	21	64	
8	Thailand (THA)	41	44	45	130	
	Ekarut Rungsarutkanchana	20	20	24	64	
	Isarapa Imprasertsuk	21	24	21	66	
9	Bahrain (BRN)	46	40	44	130	
	Tammar Al-Watt	24	24	23	71	
	Maryam Hassani	22	16	21	59	
10	Chinese Taipei (TPE)	43	43	42	128	
	Lee Meng-Yuan	25	24	23	72	
	Lo Chien-Ya	18	19	19	56	
11	Indonesia (INA)	36	33	37	106	
	Woli Hamsan	18	20	17	55	
	Yemina Natalia Sinaga	18	13	20	51	

==== Finals ====
Rank	Team	Round							Total	S-off	Notes
Rank	Team	1	2	3	4	5	6	7	Total	S-off	Notes
1st place, gold medalist(s)	China (CHN)	8	8	7	8	8	4	9	52		
1st place, gold medalist(s)	Jiang Yiting	4	4	4	3	4	4	4	27		
1st place, gold medalist(s)	Lyu Jianlin	4	4	3	5	4	0	5	25		
2nd place, silver medalist(s)	South Korea (KOR)	8	6	8	8	8	3	10	51		
2nd place, silver medalist(s)	Jang Kook-hee	4	3	4	4	4	2	5	26		
2nd place, silver medalist(s)	Lee Jong-jun	4	3	4	4	4	1	5	25		
3rd place, bronze medalist(s)	India (IND)	7	6	7					44		
3rd place, bronze medalist(s)	Parinaaz Dhaliwal	3	4	3					22		
3rd place, bronze medalist(s)	Anant Jeet Singh Naruka	4	2	4					22		
4	Qatar (QAT)	3	1	3					18		
4	Reem Al-Sharshani	2	0	2					7		
4	Rashid Saleh Al-Athba	1	1	1					11		
