= Shooting at the 2022 Asian Games – Men's skeet team =

Men's skeet team at the 2022 Asian Games
- Venue: Fuyang Yinhu Sports Centre
- Dates: 26–27 September 2023
- Competitors: 27 from 9 nations

Medalists
gold medal	China; Han Xu, Liu Jiangchi, Wu Yunxuan
silver medal	Qatar; Masoud Saleh Al-Athba, Rashid Saleh Al-Athba, Nasser Al-Attiyah
bronze medal	India; Angad Vir Singh Bajwa, Gurjoat Siingh Khangura, Anantjeet Singh Naruka

The men's skeet team competition at the 2022 Asian Games in Hangzhou, China was held on 26 and 27 September 2023 at Fuyang Yinhu Sports Centre.

== Schedule ==
All times are China Standard Time (UTC+08:00)

Date	Time	Event
Tuesday, 26 September 2023	09:00	Day 1
Wednesday, 27 September 2023	09:00	Day 2

== Records ==
Prior to this competition, the existing world, Asian and Games records were as follows.

World Record	Italy	371	Lonato, Italy	10 July 2016
Asian Record	China	366	Incheon, South Korea	30 September 2014
Games Record	China	366	Incheon, South Korea	30 September 2014

== Results ==
Rank	Team	Day 1			Day 2		Total	Notes
Rank	Team	1	2	3	4	5	Total	Notes
1st place, gold medalist(s)	China (CHN)	74	72	74	71	71	362	
	Han Xu	25	23	25	23	22	118	
	Liu Jiangchi	24	25	24	23	24	120	
	Wu Yunxuan	25	24	25	25	25	124	
2nd place, silver medalist(s)	Qatar (QAT)	74	72	72	72	69	359	
	Masoud Saleh Al-Athba	24	24	24	23	24	119	
	Rashid Saleh Al-Athba	25	23	24	25	21	118	
	Nasser Al-Attiyah	25	25	24	24	24	122	
3rd place, bronze medalist(s)	India (IND)	69	70	70	72	74	355	
	Angad Vir Singh Bajwa	22	23	24	23	25	117	
	Gurjoat Siingh Khangura	22	22	23	25	25	117	
	Anantjeet Singh Naruka	25	25	23	24	24	121	
4	Kazakhstan (KAZ)	72	73	69	70	71	355	
	David Pochivalov	22	25	24	23	24	118	
	Alexandr Yechshenko	25	25	22	23	24	119	
	Eduard Yechshenko	25	23	23	24	23	118	
5	South Korea (KOR)	73	72	71	69	68	353	
	Cho Min-ki	25	24	24	21	24	118	
	Cho Yong-seong	24	24	25	24	21	118	
	Kim Min-su	24	24	22	24	23	117	
6	Kuwait (KUW)	67	70	70	71	71	349	
	Abdullah Al-Rashidi	24	24	23	24	25	120	
	Mansour Al-Rashidi	22	24	23	23	24	116	
	Abdulaziz Al-Saad	21	22	24	24	22	113	
7	Saudi Arabia (KSA)	70	66	66	72	67	341	
	Saeed Al-Mutairi	24	21	23	22	23	113	
	Saud Al-Saud	21	22	21	25	23	112	
	Hatim Al-Shammari	25	23	22	25	21	116	
8	Pakistan (PAK)	70	72	65	67	63	337	
	Usman Chand	24	24	24	23	23	118	
	Imam Haroon	23	24	18	22	18	105	
	Ahmad Usman Sadiq	23	24	23	22	22	114	
9	Philippines (PHI)	60	62	62	58	65	307	
	Jake Ancheta	19	20	19	20	21	99	
	Enrique Enriquez	21	19	22	20	22	104	
	Paul Brian Rosario	20	23	21	18	22	104	
