= Shooting at the 2022 Asian Games – Mixed skeet team =

Mixed skeet team at the 2022 Asian Games
- Venue: Fuyang Yinhu Sports Centre
- Dates: 28 September 2023
- Competitors: 16 from 8 nations

Medalists
gold medal	Eduard Yechshenko; Assem Orynbay	Kazakhstan
silver medal	Abdullah Al-Rashidi; Eman Al-Shamaa	Kuwait
bronze medal	Rashid Saleh Al-Athba; Reem Al-Sharshani	Qatar
bronze medal	Liu Jiangchi; Jiang Yiting	China

The mixed Skeet team competition at the 2022 Asian Games in Hangzhou, China was held on 28 September 2023 at Fuyang Yinhu Sports Centre.

== Schedule ==
All times are China Standard Time (UTC+08:00)

Date	Time	Event
Thursday, 28 September 2023	09:00	Qualification
Thursday, 28 September 2023	13:00	Bronze medal matches
Thursday, 28 September 2023	14:00	Gold medal match

== Records ==
Prior to this competition, the existing world, Asian and Games records were as follows.

World Record	United States	149	Baku, Azerbaijan	20 August 2023
Asian Record	India	146	Doha, Qatar	12 November 2019
Games Record	—	—	—	—

== Results ==
=== Qualification ===
Rank	Team	Round			Total	Notes
Rank	Team	1	2	3	Total	Notes
1	Kuwait (KUW)	49	50	50	149	AR
	Abdullah Al-Rashidi	24	25	25	74	
	Eman Al-Shamaa	25	25	25	75	
2	Kazakhstan (KAZ)	50	50	48	148	
	Eduard Yechshenko	25	25	24	74	
	Assem Orynbay	25	25	24	74	
3	Qatar (QAT)	48	49	47	144	
	Rashid Saleh Al-Athba	24	25	25	74	
	Reem Al-Sharshani	24	24	22	70	
4	China (CHN)	47	47	49	143	
	Liu Jiangchi	24	24	24	72	
	Jiang Yiting	23	23	25	71	
5	Bahrain (BRN)	47	46	48	141	
	Tammar Al-Watt	25	21	24	70	
	Maryam Al-Asam	22	25	24	71	
6	South Korea (KOR)	44	47	49	140	
	Cho Min-ki	23	24	24	71	
	Jang Kook-hee	21	23	25	69	
7	India (IND)	45	47	46	138	
	Anantjeet Singh Naruka	24	24	23	71	
	Ganemat Sekhon	21	23	23	67	
8	Thailand (THA)	45	47	46	138	
	Tanapat Jangpanich	23	24	24	71	
	Sutiya Jiewchaloemmit	22	23	22	67	

=== Finals ===
==== Bronze medal match 1 ====
Team	Round						Total	S-off
Team	1	2	3	4	5	6	Total	S-off
Qatar (QAT)	7	8	6	7	8	8	44	
Rashid Saleh Al-Athba	4	4	3	3	4	4	22	
Reem Al-Sharshani	3	4	3	4	4	4	22	
Bahrain (BRN)	5	7	6	8	6	5	37	
Tammar Al-Watt	1	4	4	4	3	3	19	
Maryam Al-Asam	4	3	2	4	3	2	18	

==== Bronze medal match 2 ====
Team	Round						Total	S-off
Team	1	2	3	4	5	6	Total	S-off
China (CHN)	7	8	5	8	8	6	42	+15
Liu Jiangchi	4	4	3	4	4	3	22	
Jiang Yiting	3	4	2	4	4	3	20	
South Korea (KOR)	6	7	7	6	8	8	42	+12
Cho Min-ki	3	4	4	3	4	4	22	
Jang Kook-hee	3	3	3	3	4	4	20	

==== Gold medal match ====
Team	Round						Total	S-off
Team	1	2	3	4	5	6	Total	S-off
Kazakhstan (KAZ)	6	8	7	7	7	5	40	
Eduard Yechshenko	3	4	3	3	4	3	20	
Assem Orynbay	3	4	4	4	3	2	20	
Kuwait (KUW)	6	5	5	7	5	7	35	
Abdullah Al-Rashidi	3	3	3	3	3	3	18	
Eman Al-Shamaa	3	2	2	4	2	4	17	
