= Shooting at the 2026 Asian Games – Men's skeet =

Men's skeet at the 2026 Asian Games
- Venue: Aichi Prefectural General Shooting Gallery
- Dates: 21–23 September 2026
- Competitors: 46 from 21 nations

Medalists
gold medal	Rashid Saleh Al-Athba	Qatar
silver medal	Lyu Jianlin	China
bronze medal	Lee Meng-yuan	Chinese Taipei

The men's skeet competition at the 2026 Asian Games in Aichi Prefecture, Japan was held from 21 to 23 September 2026 at the Aichi Prefectural General Shooting Gallery.

== Schedule ==
All times are Japan Standard Time (UTC+09:00)

Date	Time	Event
Monday, 21 September 2026	10:00	Qualification day 1
Tuesday, 22 September 2026	10:00	Qualification day 2
Wednesday, 23 September 2026	10:00	Qualification day 3
Wednesday, 23 September 2026	16:00	Final

== Records ==
Prior to this competition, the existing world, Asian and Games records were as follows.

Qualification
World Record	Valerio Luchini (ITA)	125	Beijing, China	9 July 2014
Asian Record	Vladislav Mukhamediyev (KAZ)	124	Al-Ain, United Arab Emirates	23 April 2013
Games Record	Vladislav Mukhamediyev (KAZ)	124	Palembang, Indonesia	26 August 2018
Final
World Record	Vincent Hancock (USA)	36	Lonato, Italy	7 July 2026
Asian Record	Eduard Yechshenko (KAZ)	33	Doha, Qatar	15 January 2026
Games Record	Mohammad Aldaihani (KUW)	33	Doha, Qatar	15 January 2026

== Results ==
Legend

- CB — Count back
- DNS — Did not start
- Q — Qualified
- S-off — Shoot-off

=== Qualification ===
Rank	Athlete	Day 1		Day 2		Day 3	Total	S-off	Notes
Rank	Athlete	1	2	3	4	Day 3	Total	S-off	Notes
1	Lyu Jianlin (CHN)	25	24	23	24	24	120	+8	
2	Lee Meng-yuan (TPE)	24	25	23	24	24	120	+7	
3	Nasser Al-Attiyah (QAT)	24	24	23	24	25	120	+3	
4	Rashid Saleh Al-Athba (QAT)	24	25	24	22	24	119	+18	
5	Anantjeet Singh Naruka (IND)	25	22	24	25	23	119	+17	
6	Alexandr Mukhamediyev (KAZ)	24	24	25	22	24	119	+13	
7	Tammar Al-Watt (BRN)	24	22	25	25	23	119	+3	
8	Mohammad Al-Awaad (KUW)	21	24	25	23	25	118	+2	
9	Lee Jong-jun (KOR)	23	25	24	23	23	118	+1	
10	Wan Antao (CHN)	23	24	23	23	24	117		
11	Saif Bin Futtais (UAE)	24	25	24	22	22	117		
12	Mairaj Ahmad Khan (IND)	23	22	23	23	25	116		
13	Lee Joon Kit Joseph (MAS)	23	21	23	25	24	116		
14	Samer Sarkis (LBN)	24	23	21	23	24	115		
15	Abdullah Al-Rashidi (KUW)	24	24	23	21	23	115		
16	Mohammad Aldaihani (KUW)	23	24	23	23	22	115		
17	David Pochivalov (KAZ)	24	23	23	23	22	115		
18	Shotaro Toguchi (JPN)	22	23	23	23	23	114		
19	Bekhruz Sharapov (UZB)	24	23	23	22	22	114		
20	Ali Ahmed Al-Ishaq (QAT)	25	23	22	23	21	114		
21	Jang Ja-yong (KOR)	24	24	21	21	23	113		
22	Zhang Feng-Qi (TPE)	23	24	22	23	21	113		
23	Mohammed Ahmed (UAE)	25	25	22	21	20	113		
24	Saeid Mugbel Al-Mutairi (KSA)	23	20	22	23	24	112		
25	Ekarut Rungsarutkanchana (THA)	24	23	19	23	23	112		
26	Wang Han-Tsun (TPE)	24	23	22	21	22	112		
27	Jorgeantonio Salhe (PLE)	23	21	23	25	20	112		
28	Artyom Sedelnikov (KAZ)	24	24	20	24	20	112		
29	Bhavtegh Singh Gill (IND)	21	23	20	22	25	111		
30	Bekzod Abdurakhimov (UZB)	22	22	23	20	24	111		
31	Marcelo Yarad (PLE)	23	21	24	21	22	111		
32	Saud bin Hassan Al Saud (KSA)	23	23	23	21	21	111		
33	Kim Min-su (KOR)	19	23	22	24	22	110		
34	Tanapat Jangpanich (THA)	21	23	21	22	22	109		
35	Enrique Enriquez (PHI)	21	23	23	21	20	108		
36	Fahad Alharbi (KSA)	20	21	21	21	23	106		
37	Kazunari Maruyama (JPN)	21	20	22	21	22	106		
38	Ruslan Utaganov (UZB)	23	20	20	21	22	106		
39	Pitipoom Phasee (THA)	19	20	22	20	23	104		
40	Low Jiang Hao (SGP)	22	21	21	20	20	104		CB:12
41	Naghmush Al Hattali (OMA)	22	21	21	20	20	104		CB:3
42	Woli Hamsan (INA)	23	18	23	20	17	101		
43	Johny Abujeries (PLE)	17	17	17	16	21	88		
—	Usman Chand (PAK)						DNS		
—	Imam Haroon (PAK)						DNS		
—	Paul Brian Rosario (PHI)						DNS		

=== Final ===
Rank	Athlete	Nation	Series									Total	S-off	Notes
Rank	Athlete	Nation	1	2	3	4	5	6	7	8	9	Total	S-off	Notes
1st place, gold medalist(s)	Rashid Saleh Al-Athba	Qatar	4	4	4	4	4	4	4	3	3	34		GR
2nd place, silver medalist(s)	Lyu Jianlin	China	3	4	4	4	4	4	4	3	3	33		
3rd place, bronze medalist(s)	Lee Meng-yuan	Chinese Taipei	4	4	3	4	4	4	3	3		29		
4	Anant Jeet Singh Naruka	India	2	4	4	4	4	3	4			25		
5	Nasser Al-Attiyah	Qatar	4	4	2	3	4	2				19		
6	Alexandr Mukhamediyev	Kazakhstan	3	4	3	2	4	3				19		
7	Mohammad Alawaad	Kuwait	3	4	3							10		
8	Tammar Al-Watt	Bahrain	2	4	3							9		
