= Shooting at the 2026 Asian Games – Men's skeet team =

Men's skeet team at the 2026 Asian Games
- Venue: Aichi Pref. General Shooting Gallery
- Dates: 23 September 2026
- Competitors: 30 from 10 nations

Medalists
gold medal	Qatar; Nasser Al-Attiyah, Ali Ahmed Al-Ishaq, Rashid Saleh Al-Athba
silver medal	Kuwait; Mohammad Al-Awaad, Mohammad Aldaihani, Abdullah Al-Rashidi
bronze medal	India; Mairaj Ahmad Khan, Anantjeet Singh Naruka, Bhavtegh Singh Gill

The men's skeet team competition at the 2026 Asian Games in Aichi Prefecture, Japan was held on 23 September 2026 at the Aichi Pref. General Shooting Gallery.

== Schedule ==
All times are Japan Standard Time (UTC+09:00)

Date	Time	Event
Monday, 21 September 2026	09:00	Day 1
Tuesday, 22 September 2026	09:00	Day 2
Wednesday, 23 September 2026	10:00	Day 3

== Records ==
Prior to this competition, the existing world, Asian and Games records were as follows.

World Record	Italy	371	Lonato, Italy	10 July 2016
Asian Record	China	366	Incheon, South Korea	30 September 2014
Games Record	China	366	Incheon, South Korea	30 September 2014

== Results ==
Rank	Team	Day 1		Day 2		Day 3	Total	Notes
Rank	Team	1	2	3	4	Day 3	Total	Notes
1st place, gold medalist(s)	Qatar (QAT)	73	72	69	69	70	353	
	Nasser Al-Attiyah	24	24	23	24	25	120	
	Ali Ahmed Al-Ishaq	25	23	22	23	21	114	
	Rashid Saleh Al-Athba	24	25	24	22	24	119	
2nd place, silver medalist(s)	Kuwait (KUW)	68	72	71	67	70	348	
	Mohammad Al-Awaad	21	24	25	23	25	118	
	Mohammad Aldaihani	23	24	23	23	22	115	
	Abdullah Al-Rashidi	24	24	23	21	23	115	
3rd place, bronze medalist(s)	India (IND)	69	67	67	70	73	346	
	Mairaj Ahmad Khan	23	22	23	23	25	116	
	Anantjeet Singh Naruka	25	22	24	25	23	119	
	Bhavtegh Singh Gill	21	23	20	22	25	111	
4	Kazakhstan (KAZ)	72	71	68	69	66	346	
	Alexandr Mukhamediyev	24	24	25	22	24	119	
	Artyom Sedelnikov	24	24	20	24	20	112	
	David Pochivalov	24	23	23	23	22	115	
5	Chinese Taipei (TPE)	71	72	67	68	67	345	
	Zhang Feng-Qi	23	24	22	23	21	113	
	Wang Han-Tsun	24	23	22	21	22	112	
	Lee Meng-yuan	24	25	23	24	24	120	
6	South Korea (KOR)	66	72	67	68	68	341	
	Lee Jong-jun	23	25	24	23	23	118	
	Kim Min-su	19	23	22	24	22	110	
	Jang Ja-yong	24	24	21	21	23	113	
7	Uzbekistan (UZB)	69	65	66	63	68	331	
	Bekzod Abdurakhimov	22	22	23	20	24	111	
	Bekhruz Sharapov	24	23	23	22	22	114	
	Ruslan Utaganov	23	20	20	21	22	106	
8	Saudi Arabia (KSA)	66	64	66	65	68	329	
	Saud Alhassan Al Saud	23	23	23	21	21	111	
	Saeid Mugbel Al-Mutairi	23	20	22	23	24	112	
	Fahad Alharbi	20	21	21	21	23	106	
9	Thailand (THA)	64	66	62	65	68	325	
	Ekarut Rungsarutkanchana	24	23	19	23	23	112	
	Pitipoom Phasee	19	20	22	20	23	104	
	Tanapat Jangpanich	21	23	21	22	22	109	
10	Palestine (PLE)	63	59	64	62	63	311	
	Marcelo Yarad	23	21	24	21	22	111	
	Jorgeantonio Salhe	23	21	23	25	20	112	
	Johny Abujeries	17	17	17	16	21	88	
