= Angad Vir Singh Bajwa =

Canadian skeet shooter (born 1995)

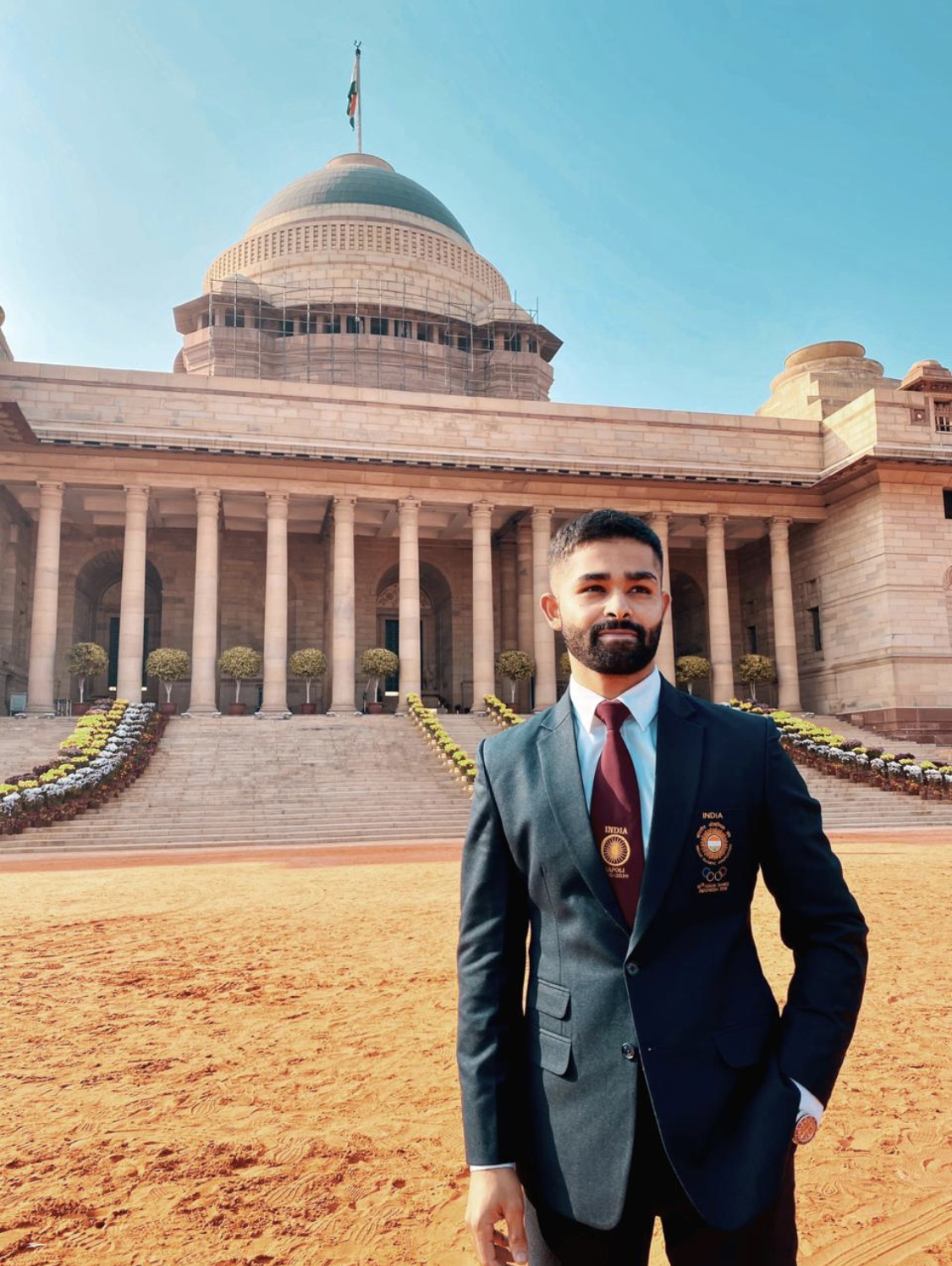
- Bajwa at the Rashtrapati Bhavan in 2020

Personal information
- Nationality: Canada
- Born: 29 November 1995 (age 30) Chandigarh, India

Sport
- Country: India (2013–2025); Canada (2026–)
- Sport: Shooting
- Event: Skeet

Achievements and titles
- Personal bests: 60/60 WR (2018); 123/125 (2019)
Medal record
Men's skeet shooting
Representing India
World Cup
Gold medal – first place	2021 New Delhi	Mixed team
Gold medal – first place	2021 New Delhi	Team
Bronze medal – third place	2017 New Delhi	Mixed team
Bronze medal – third place	2021 Cairo	Team
Asian Games
Bronze medal – third place	2022 Hangzhou	Team
Asian Championships
Gold medal – first place	2018 Kuwait City	Individual
Gold medal – first place	2019 Doha	Individual
Gold medal – first place	2023 Changwon	Team
Silver medal – second place	2019 Doha	Mixed team
Bronze medal – third place	2017 Astana	Team
Universiade
Bronze medal – third place	2019 Naples	Individual
Junior Asian Championships
Gold medal – first place	2015 Kuwait City	Individual
Gold medal – first place	2015 Kuwait City	Team

Angad Vir Singh Bajwa (born 29 November 1995) is a Canadian skeet shooter. In 2018, he became the first shooter to set the skeet final round world record of 60 out of 60.

== Early and personal life ==
Bajwa was born on 29 November 1995 in Chandigarh. He finished his schooling at the Sherwood College in 2013. He later moved to Vancouver and enrolled at the University of British Columbia, but left his studies midway to return to India and focus on shooting. In 2020, Bajwa went on to pursue a Bachelor of Business Administration degree at the Manav Rachna University.

In 2025, Bajwa switched his nationality from Indian to Canadian. His family is based in Canada, where his father, Gurpal, operates a hospitality business, which was one of the reasons that influenced his decision to relocate from India.

== Career ==
At the 2015 Asian Championships in Kuwait City, the trio of Bajwa, Anantjeet Singh Naruka and Arjun Mann won the gold medal in the men's skeet junior team event. Bajwa also won gold in the junior individual event.

Bajwa participated in the 2018 Asian Games in Jakarta where he shot 119 out of 125 and failed to qualify for the final. He won the gold medal at the 2018 Asian Championships in Kuwait City by shooting a world record 60 out of 60 in the final round of the men's skeet competition. This was India's first ever gold medal in the skeet discipline in a continental or world-level tournament.

Making a comeback after an illness, Bajwa won the bronze medal at the 2019 Universiade in Naples. At the 2019 Asian Championships in Doha, he won gold in the men's skeet event after a shoot-off with fellow Indian Mairaj Ahmad Khan, who settled for silver. As a result of this, both Bajwa and Khan bagged 2020 Tokyo Olympics quota places for India. Bajwa also won silver in the mixed team event, with Ganemat Sekhon, in the same competition.

At the 2021 World Cup in New Delhi, Bajwa won the gold medal in men's skeet team event with Mairaj Ahmad Khan and Gurjoat Siingh Khangura. Bajwa finished 18th in men's skeet event at the 2020 Tokyo Olympics with a score of 120/125.

At the 2022 Asian Games in Hangzhou, the trio of Bajwa, Anantjeet Singh Naruka and Gurjoat Siingh Khangura won the bronze medal in the men's skeet team event. Later at the 2023 Asian Championships in Changwon, the same trio won the gold medal in the men's skeet team event.

He last represented India at the international level at the 2025 Asian Championships in Shymkent, where he competed for ranking points only.
