= Yu Haicheng =

Chinese sport shooter

Personal information
- Nationality: Chinese
- Born: 5 April 1998 (age 28)

Sport
- Sport: Shooting
Medal record
Men's shooting
Representing China
Asian Championships
Gold medal – first place	2022 Almaty	Trap team
Gold medal – first place	2024 Kuwait City	Trap team
Bronze medal – third place	2019 Almaty	Trap team
Bronze medal – third place	2019 Almaty	Mixed trap team
Bronze medal – third place	2022 Almaty	Trap
Bronze medal – third place	2022 Almaty	Mixed trap team

Yu Haicheng is a Chinese sport shooter. He represents China at the 2020 Summer Olympics in Tokyo.
