= Shooting at the 2026 Asian Games – Women's skeet team =

Women's skeet team at the 2026 Asian Games
- Venue: Aichi Pref. General Shooting Gallery
- Dates: 23 September 2026
- Competitors: 21 from 7 nations

Medalists
gold medal	China; Che Yufei, Jiang Chaoyu, Jiang Yiting
silver medal	Kazakhstan; Assem Orynbay, Zoya Piskun, Adel Sadakbayeva
bronze medal	India; Maheshwari Chauhan, Parinaaz Dhaliwal, Raiza Dhillon

The women's skeet team competition at the 2026 Asian Games in Aichi Prefecture, Japan was held on 23 September 2026 at the Aichi Pref. General Shooting Gallery.

== Schedule ==
All times are Japan Standard Time (UTC+09:00)

Date	Time	Event
Wednesday, 23 September 2026	10:00	Final

== Records ==
Prior to this competition, the existing world, Asian and Games records were as follows.

World Record	United States	365	Baku, Azerbaijan	18 August 2023
Asian Record	China	363	Doha, Qatar	10 November 2019
Games Record	Kazakhstan	350	Hangzhou, China	26 September 2023

== Results ==
Rank	Team	Day 1		Day 2		Day 3	Total	Notes
Rank	Team	1	2	3	4	Day 3	Total	Notes
1st place, gold medalist(s)	China (CHN)	68	75	70	74	70	357	GR
	Che Yufei	24	25	23	25	25	122	
	Jiang Chaoyu	21	25	23	25	23	117	
	Jiang Yiting	23	25	24	24	22	118	
2nd place, silver medalist(s)	Kazakhstan (KAZ)	70	68	68	68	62	336	
	Assem Orynbay	23	24	25	24	21	117	
	Zoya Piskun	25	22	22	22	22	113	
	Adel Sadakbayeva	22	22	21	22	19	106	
3rd place, bronze medalist(s)	India (IND)	67	65	64	70	65	331	
	Maheshwari Chauhan	19	23	21	22	24	109	
	Parinaaz Dhaliwal	23	21	21	24	22	111	
	Raiza Dhillon	25	21	22	24	19	111	
4	South Korea (KOR)	64	66	65	62	67	324	
	An Il-ji	21	21	22	19	22	105	
	Jang Kook-hee	21	25	19	25	22	112	
	Kim Chae-eun	22	20	24	18	23	107	
5	Japan (JPN)	66	65	63	62	65	321	
	Rika Kaiga	23	22	21	21	22	109	
	Yuka Kojima	21	21	23	23	22	110	
	Mirano Suzuki	22	22	19	18	21	102	
6	Qatar (QAT)	62	63	61	63	65	314	
	Reem Al-Sharshani	24	21	22	22	22	111	
	Hajar Ghulam Mohammed	20	22	20	19	21	102	
	Sarah Ghulam Mohammed	18	20	19	22	22	101	
7	Kuwait (KUW)	61	67	57	61	64	310	
	Afrah Al-Mohammad	18	21	17	21	19	96	
	Eman Al-Shamaa	21	22	22	21	22	108	
	Fatema Al-Zaabi	22	24	18	19	23	106	
