= Wang Xiaojing =

Chinese sport shooter

Personal information
- Nationality: Chinese
- Born: 3 May 1992 (age 34) Hefei, China
- Height: 1.78 m (5 ft 10 in)
- Weight: 78 kg (172 lb)

Sport
- Country: China
- Sport: Shooting
- Event: Trap
- Club: Jie Fang Jun
Medal record
Women's shooting
Representing China
World Championships
Silver medal – second place	2018 Changwon	Trap
Silver medal – second place	2019 Lonato del Garda	Trap
Asian Championships
Gold medal – first place	2017 Astana	Trap team
Gold medal – first place	2018 Kuwait City	Trap
Gold medal – first place	2018 Kuwait City	Trap team
Gold medal – first place	2022 Almaty	Trap team
Gold medal – first place	2023 Changwon	Trap team
Gold medal – first place	2024 Kuwait City	Trap team
Silver medal – second place	2019 Doha	Trap team
Bronze medal – third place	2018 Kuwait City	Mixed trap team
Bronze medal – third place	2022 Almaty	Mixed trap team
Bronze medal – third place	2023 Changwon	Trap
Bronze medal – third place	2024 Kuwait City	Mixed trap team

Wang Xiaojing (born 3 May 1992) is a Chinese sport shooter.

She participated at the 2018 ISSF World Shooting Championships, winning a medal.
