= Shooting at the 2024 Summer Olympics – Mixed skeet team =

Mixed skeet team at the Games of the XXXIII Olympiad
- Venue: National Shooting Centre, Châteauroux
- Date: 5 August 2024
- Competitors: 30 from 13 nations
- Teams: 15

Medalists
1st place, gold medalist(s)		Diana Bacosi / Gabriele Rossetti	Italy
2nd place, silver medalist(s)		Austen Smith / Vincent Hancock	United States
3rd place, bronze medalist(s)		Jiang Yiting / Lyu Jianlin	China

The Mixed skeet team event at the 2024 Summer Olympics took place on 5 August 2024 at the National Shooting Centre, Châteauroux.

== Schedule ==
All times are Central European Time (UTC+2)

Date	Time	Round
Monday, August 5	09:00	Qualification
Monday, August 5	15:00	Medal matches

== Results ==
=== Qualification ===
Rank	Country	Athletes	1	2	3	Total	Grand Total	Shoot-off	Notes
1	Italy 1	Diana Bacosi	24	25	25	74	149		Q, =WR
1	Italy 1	Gabriele Rossetti	25	25	25	75	149		Q, =WR
2	United States 1	Austen Smith	25	23	25	73	148		Q
2	United States 1	Vincent Hancock	25	25	25	75	148		Q
3	China	Jiang Yiting	25	25	24	74	146	+4	Q
3	China	Lyu Jianlin	23	24	25	72	146	+4	Q
4	India	Maheshwari Chauhan	24	25	25	74	146	+3	Q
4	India	Anantjeet Singh Naruka	25	23	24	72	146	+3	Q
5	Italy 2	Martina Bartolomei	24	23	23	70	144		
5	Italy 2	Tammaro Cassandro	25	24	25	74	144		
6	United States 2	Dania Vizzi	24	25	23	72	144		
6	United States 2	Conner Prince	24	24	24	72	144		
7	South Korea	Jang Kook-hee	24	25	22	71	144		
7	South Korea	Kim Min-soo	25	24	24	73	144		
8	Czech Republic	Barbora Šumová	22	23	23	68	143		
8	Czech Republic	Jakub Tomeček	25	25	25	75	143		
9	France	Lucie Anastassiou	24	24	21	69	143		
9	France	Éric Delaunay	25	25	24	74	143		
10	Germany	Nele Wißmer	22	24	23	69	142		
10	Germany	Sven Korte	23	25	25	73	142		
11	Australia	Aislin Jones	24	23	21	68	141		
11	Australia	Joshua Bell	25	24	24	73	141		
12	Kazakhstan	Assem Orynbay	23	24	23	70	140		
12	Kazakhstan	Eduard Yechshenko	23	24	23	70	140		
13	Greece	Emmanouela Katzouraki	22	23	22	67	139		
13	Greece	Efthimios Mitas	24	24	24	72	139		
14	Peru	Daniella Borda	21	23	24	68	139		
14	Peru	Nicolás Pacheco	25	24	22	71	139		
15	Sweden	Victoria Larsson	21	23	23	67	136		
15	Sweden	Marcus Svensson	23	24	22	69	136		

=== Final ===
Rank	Country	Athletes	1	2	Total	Grand Total	Notes
Gold medal match
1st place, gold medalist(s)	Italy 1	Diana Bacosi	10	12	22	45	
1st place, gold medalist(s)	Italy 1	Gabriele Rossetti	12	11	23	45	
2nd place, silver medalist(s)	United States 1	Austen Smith	10	11	21	44	
2nd place, silver medalist(s)	United States 1	Vincent Hancock	11	12	23	44	
Bronze medal match
3rd place, bronze medalist(s)	China	Jiang Yiting	11	9	20	44	
3rd place, bronze medalist(s)	China	Lyu Jianlin	12	12	24	44	
4	India	Maheshwari Chauhan	11	10	21	43	
4	India	Anantjeet Singh Naruka	11	11	22	43	
