= Shooting at the 2002 Asian Games – Women's 25 metre pistol team =

Women's 25 metre pistol team at the 2002 Asian Games
- Venue: Changwon International Shooting Range
- Dates: 4 October 2002
- Competitors: 24 from 8 nations

Medalists
gold medal	China; Chen Ying, Li Duihong, Tao Luna
silver medal	Japan; Michiko Fukushima, Yukari Konishi, Yuki Yoshida
bronze medal	Kazakhstan; Zauresh Baibussinova, Galina Belyayeva, Yuliya Bondareva

The women's 25 metre pistol team competition at the 2002 Asian Games in Busan, South Korea was held on 4 October at the Changwon International Shooting Range.

== Schedule ==
All times are Korea Standard Time (UTC+09:00)

Date	Time	Event
Friday, 4 October 2002	09:00	Final

== Records ==
Prior to this competition, the existing world, Asian and Games records were as follows.

World Record	Soviet Union	1764	Zagreb, Yugoslavia	13 July 1989
Asian Record	China	1757	Beijing, China	25 September 1990
Games Record	China	1757	Beijing, China	25 September 1990

== Results ==
Rank	Athlete	Precision			Rapid			Total	Notes
Rank	Athlete	1	2	3	1	2	3	Total	Notes
1st place, gold medalist(s)	China (CHN)	291	298	296	294	296	293	1768	WR
	Chen Ying	96	99	97	100	100	100	592	
	Li Duihong	96	99	100	97	97	98	587	
	Tao Luna	99	100	99	97	99	95	589	
2nd place, silver medalist(s)	Japan (JPN)	286	288	295	287	290	293	1739	
	Michiko Fukushima	98	93	100	95	95	98	579	
	Yukari Konishi	92	99	98	95	98	99	581	
	Yuki Yoshida	96	96	97	97	97	96	579	
3rd place, bronze medalist(s)	Kazakhstan (KAZ)	293	285	289	288	291	291	1737	
	Zauresh Baibussinova	95	93	97	94	96	96	571	
	Galina Belyayeva	100	96	96	96	97	98	583	
	Yuliya Bondareva	98	96	96	98	98	97	583	
4	South Korea (KOR)	285	290	287	287	286	294	1729	
	Choi Kum-ran	93	97	98	94	96	97	575	
	Gang Eun-ra	95	98	96	96	95	97	577	
	Ko Jin-sook	97	95	93	97	95	100	577	
5	Mongolia (MGL)	277	288	285	293	293	290	1726	
	Otryadyn Gündegmaa	93	97	95	100	100	98	583	
	Tsogbadrakhyn Mönkhzul	93	97	96	98	97	98	579	
	Davaajantsangiin Oyuun	91	94	94	95	96	94	564	
6	North Korea (PRK)	288	289	287	285	287	280	1716	
	Kang Un-byol	95	96	95	97	98	93	574	
	Kim Hye-song	98	99	96	95	94	92	574	
	Pak Hye-gyong	95	94	96	93	95	95	568	
7	United Arab Emirates (UAE)	283	279	275	285	276	277	1675	
	Fatima Al-Booki	94	92	90	96	89	92	553	
	Shamma Al-Muhairi	94	93	92	92	96	95	562	
	Sumaya Mubarak	95	94	93	97	91	90	560	
8	Qatar (QAT)	250	249	260	263	259	267	1548	
	Hissa Al-Asiri	76	78	88	89	95	88	514	
	Banu Hijazi	93	89	91	89	86	94	542	
	Bahiya Jabir	81	82	81	85	78	85	492	
