= Shooting at the 2014 Asian Games – Men's double trap team =

Men's double trap team at the 2014 Asian Games
- Venue: Gyeonggido Shooting Range
- Dates: 25 September 2014
- Competitors: 24 from 8 nations

Medalists
| gold medal | Qatar; Masoud Hamad Al-Athba, Rashid Hamad Al-Athba, Hamad Al-Marri |
| silver medal | China; Hu Binyuan, Li Jun, Mo Junjie |
| bronze medal | Kuwait; Ahmad Al-Afasi, Hamad Al-Afasi, Fehaid Al-Deehani |

The men's double trap team competition at the 2014 Asian Games in Incheon, South Korea was held on 25 September at the Gyeonggido Shooting Range.

== Schedule ==
All times are Korea Standard Time (UTC+09:00)

| Date | Time | Event |
|---|---|---|
| Thursday, 25 September 2014 | 09:00 | Final |

== Records ==
Prior to this competition, the existing world, Asian and Games records were as follows.

| World Record | Italy | 424 | Suhl, Germany | 3 August 2013 |
| Asian Record | China | 418 | Granada, Spain | 14 September 2014 |
| Games Record | — | — | — | — |

== Results ==
Legend

- DNS — Did not start

| Rank | Team | Round | | | | | Total | Notes |
| Rank | Team | 1 | 2 | 3 | 4 | 5 | Total | Notes |
|---|---|---|---|---|---|---|---|---|
| 1st place, gold medalist(s) | Qatar (QAT) | 79 | 81 | 78 | 82 | 84 | 404 | GR |
| | Masoud Hamad Al-Athba | 26 | 28 | 28 | 26 | 29 | 137 | |
| | Rashid Hamad Al-Athba | 27 | 27 | 26 | 29 | 27 | 136 | |
| | Hamad Al-Marri | 26 | 26 | 24 | 27 | 28 | 131 | |
| 2nd place, silver medalist(s) | China (CHN) | 77 | 78 | 85 | 81 | 83 | 404 | GR |
| | Hu Binyuan | 26 | 27 | 28 | 28 | 29 | 138 | |
| | Li Jun | 25 | 26 | 28 | 25 | 28 | 132 | |
| | Mo Junjie | 26 | 25 | 29 | 28 | 26 | 134 | |
| 3rd place, bronze medalist(s) | Kuwait (KUW) | 82 | 79 | 83 | 79 | 81 | 404 | GR |
| | Ahmad Al-Afasi | 26 | 27 | 27 | 25 | 27 | 132 | |
| | Hamad Al-Afasi | 27 | 22 | 28 | 26 | 27 | 130 | |
| | Fehaid Al-Deehani | 29 | 30 | 28 | 28 | 27 | 142 | |
| 4 | South Korea (KOR) | 82 | 85 | 79 | 80 | 75 | 401 | |
| | Chun Hong-jae | 26 | 27 | 23 | 27 | 24 | 127 | |
| | Hwang Sung-jin | 27 | 29 | 27 | 27 | 25 | 135 | |
| | Shin Hyun-woo | 29 | 29 | 29 | 26 | 26 | 139 | |
| 5 | United Arab Emirates (UAE) | 80 | 77 | 80 | 80 | 83 | 400 | |
| | Khaled Al-Kaabi | 26 | 25 | 28 | 23 | 26 | 128 | |
| | Juma Al-Maktoum | 29 | 25 | 28 | 29 | 28 | 139 | |
| | Saif Al-Shamsi | 25 | 27 | 24 | 28 | 29 | 133 | |
| 6 | India (IND) | 79 | 78 | 81 | 78 | 82 | 398 | |
| | Mohammed Asab | 27 | 25 | 26 | 26 | 27 | 131 | |
| | Sangram Dahiya | 26 | 26 | 26 | 26 | 27 | 131 | |
| | Ankur Mittal | 26 | 27 | 29 | 26 | 28 | 136 | |
| 7 | Lebanon (LIB) | 78 | 78 | 82 | 79 | 77 | 394 | |
| | Elie Akiki | 25 | 26 | 27 | 28 | 25 | 131 | |
| | Elias Kaadi | 27 | 25 | 27 | 24 | 29 | 132 | |
| | Wissam Khalil | 26 | 27 | 28 | 27 | 23 | 131 | |
| — | Iran (IRI) | | | | | | DNS | |
| | Masoud Azizian | | | | | | DNS | |
| | Amir Chavoshi | 25 | 23 | 27 | 28 | 28 | 131 | |
| | Siavash Khoshnevis | 23 | 25 | 25 | 28 | 25 | 126 | |
