= 2024 Asian Shotgun Championships =

- Host city: Kuwait City, Kuwait
- Dates: 14–21 January 2024
- Main venue: Sheikh Sabah Al-Ahmad Olympic Shooting Complex

The 2024 Asian Shotgun Championships was the 11th Asian Shotgun Championships which took place from 14 to 21 January 2024, in Kuwait City, Kuwait.

It was the last Asian qualifying shooting tournament for the 2024 Summer Olympics in Paris.

== Medal summary ==
=== Men ===
Event	Gold	Silver	Bronze
Trap	Mohammad Beiranvand; Iran	Guo Yuhao; China	Lakshay Sheoran; India
Trap team	China; Guo Yuhao; Sun Chonglun; Yu Haicheng	Qatar; Rashid Hamad Al-Athba; Nasser Al-Hemaidi; Mohammed Al-Rumaihi	Kuwait; Abdulrahman Al-Faihan; Naser Al-Meqlad; Talal Al-Rashidi
Skeet	Lee Meng-yuan; Chinese Taipei	Anantjeet Singh Naruka; India	Mohammad Al-Daihani; Kuwait
Skeet team	China; Ma Chenglong; Wu Yunxuan; Zhang Yukun	Kuwait; Mohammad Al-Daihani; Abdullah Al-Rashidi; Saud Habib	India; Munek Battula; Gurjoat Siingh Khangura; Anantjeet Singh Naruka

=== Women ===
Event	Gold	Silver	Bronze
Trap	Liu Wan-yu; Chinese Taipei	Zhang Xinqiu; China	Mariya Dmitriyenko; Kazakhstan
Trap team	China; Hu Yue; Wang Xiaojing; Zhang Xinqiu	India; Manisha Keer; Shreyasi Singh; Bhavya Tripathi	Kazakhstan; Mariya Dmitriyenko; Aizhan Dosmagambetova; Anastassiya Prilepina
Skeet	Gao Jinmei; China	Raiza Dhillon; India	Maheshwari Chauhan; India
Skeet team	India; Maheshwari Chauhan; Raiza Dhillon; Ganemat Sekhon	China; Gao Jinmei; Jiang Yiting; Sun Yiling	Kazakhstan; Zoya Kravchenko; Assem Orynbay; Olga Panarina

=== Mixed ===
Event	Gold	Silver	Bronze
Trap team	Kazakhstan; Alisher Aisalbayev; Mariya Dmitriyenko	Iran; Mohammad Beiranvand; Marzieh Parvareshnia	China; Guo Yuhao; Wang Xiaojing
Trap team	Kazakhstan; Alisher Aisalbayev; Mariya Dmitriyenko	Iran; Mohammad Beiranvand; Marzieh Parvareshnia	Kuwait; Naser Al-Meqlad; Shahad Al-Hawal
Skeet team	China; Wu Yunxuan; Jiang Yiting	Kazakhstan; Eduard Yechshenko; Assem Orynbay	Bahrain; Tammar Al-Watt; Maryam Hassani
Skeet team	China; Wu Yunxuan; Jiang Yiting	Kazakhstan; Eduard Yechshenko; Assem Orynbay	India; Gurjoat Siingh Khangura; Raiza Dhillon

== Medal table ==
Rank	Nation	Gold	Silver	Bronze	Total
1	China	5	3	1	9
2	Chinese Taipei	2	0	0	2
3	India	1	3	4	8
4	Kazakhstan	1	1	3	5
5	Iran	1	1	0	2
6	Kuwait	0	1	3	4
7	Qatar	0	1	0	1
8	Bahrain	0	0	1	1
Totals (8 entries)		10	10	12	32
