= Bhavtegh Singh Gill =

Indian sport shooter (born 2003)

Personal information
- Nationality: Indian
- Born: 8 July 2003 (age 23)

Sport
- Sport: Sport shooting
- Event: Skeet
Medal record
Men's skeet
Representing India
Asian Games
Bronze medal – third place	2026 Aichi–Nagoya	Skeet team
National Shooting Championship
Gold medal – first place	2024 Delhi	Skeet

Bhavtegh Singh Gill (born 8 July 2003) is an Indian sport shooter. He won a bronze medal as part of the Indian men's skeet team at the 2026 Asian Games.

== Career ==
Gill partnered with Anantjeet Singh Naruka, Mairaj Ahmed Khan to claim a bronze medal for India in the men's skeet team event defeating Kazakhstan in a shoot-off after finishing level on 346 points each. Anantjeet top scored for India with 119 points out of 125. Mairaj Ahmed Khan garnered 116 while Bhavtegh Singh Gill shot 111.

In November 2024, he won a gold medal in skeet at the 2024 FISU World University Shooting Championship at New Delhi. He shot 58 in the final to beat Petros Englezoudis of Cyprus and teammate Abhay Singh Sekhon, who claimed a bronze. Earlier, he scored 119 out of 125 in the qualification rounds to enter the final. In December 2024, he won the gold in skeet event at the National Shooting Championship in Delhi beating Air India's Fatehbir Singh Shergill 54–51 in the final.

In October 2022, he partnered with Muffadal Zahra Deesawala to claim a bronze medal in the mixed team junior skeet event at the ISSF Shotgun World Championship in Osijek, Croatia.
