= Ahmad Al-Afasi =

Kuwaiti athlete

Ahmad Alafasi
Personal information
- Nationality: Kuwaiti
- Born: 10 January 1983 (age 43) Kuwait

Fencing career
- Sport: Fencing
- Country: Kuwait
Medal record
Men's shooting
Representing Kuwait
World Championships
Bronze medal – third place	2015 Lonato del Garda	Double trap
Asian Games
Bronze medal – third place	2014 Incheon	Double trap team
Asian Championships
Gold medal – first place	2013 Almaty	Double trap team
Gold medal – first place	2015 Kuwait City	Double trap team
Gold medal – first place	2016 Abu Dhabi	Double trap
Silver medal – second place	2014 Al Ain	Double trap
Silver medal – second place	2018 Kuwait City	Double trap
Silver medal – second place	2018 Kuwait City	Double trap team
Silver medal – second place	2019 Doha	Double trap team
ISSF Grand Prix
Silver medal – second place	2019 Lonato del Garda	Double trap team

Ahmad Alafasi (born 10 January 1983) is a Kuwait athlete who competed in the Men's Double Trap Shooting competition in the 2016 Summer Olympics. He participated within the Independent Olympic Athletes team.
