= Anantjeet Singh Naruka =

Indian skeet shooter (born 1998)

Personal information
- Born: 1 July 1998 (age 28) Jaipur, Rajasthan, India
- Height: 1.88 m (6 ft 2 in)

Sport
- Sport: Shooting
- Event: Skeet
- Coached by: Pietro Genga; Ennio Falco; Riccardo Filippelli
Medal record
Men's skeet shooting
Representing India
World Cup Final
Bronze medal – third place	2024 New Delhi	Individual
Asian Games
Silver medal – second place	2022 Hangzhou	Individual
Bronze medal – third place	2022 Hangzhou	Team
Bronze medal – third place	2026 Aichi–Nagoya	Team
Bronze medal – third place	2026 Aichi–Nagoya	Mixed team
Asian Championships
Gold medal – first place	2023 Changwon	Team
Gold medal – first place	2023 Changwon	Mixed team
Gold medal – first place	2025 Shymkent	Individual
Silver medal – second place	2024 Kuwait	Individual
Bronze medal – third place	2024 Kuwait	Team
Junior World Cup
Bronze medal – third place	2015 Suhl	Individual
Junior Asian Championships
Silver medal – second place	2014 Al-Ain	Individual

Anantjeet Singh Naruka (born 1 July 1998) is an Indian skeet shooter. He is a bronze medalist at the World Cup Final, and a silver and three-time bronze medalist at the Asian Games. He is a three-time gold medalist, as well as silver and bronze medalist at the Asian Championships. Naruka finished fourth in the mixed skeet event at the 2024 Paris Olympics, losing the bronze medal by a point, with a scoreline of 43–44.

== Early life ==
Naruka was born on 1 July 1998, in Jaipur, Rajasthan. He was initially coached by his father, who was also a skeet shooter.

== Career ==
His first major win in a senior tournament was in 2015, when he won the gold medal in men's skeet at the 2015 National Shotgun Championships in Jaipur. He participated at the 2023 ISSF World Cup in Almaty in the mixed skeet competition, with his partner being Ganemat Sekhon. They placed 6th in the final tally.

Naruka qualified for the 2023 Asian Games for two events, the individual men's skeet and the team men's skeet. He won a silver medal in the men's skeet competition, with a score of 58/60. He also won a bronze medal for the team competition, along with his teammates Gurjoat Siingh Khangura and Angad Vir Singh Bajwa.

He has been coached by names like Pietro Genga, Ennio Falco and Riccardo Filippelli.
