= Jiang Chaoyu =

Chinese sport shooter (born 2004)

Personal information
- Nationality: Chinese
- Born: 17 January 2004 (age 22)

Sport
- Sport: Shooting
- Event: Skeet
Medal record
Women's Shooting
Representing China
World Championships
Gold medal – first place	2026 Doha	Skeet team
Bronze medal – third place	2026 Doha	Skeet
Asian Games
Gold medal – first place	2026 Aichi–Nagoya	Skeet team
Asian Championships
Gold medal – first place	2025 Shymkent	Skeet team
Silver medal – second place	2025 Shymkent	Skeet

Jiang Chaoyu (Chinese: 蒋朝宇; born 17 January 2004) is a Chinese sport shooter competing in the skeet event.

== Career ==
In September 2026, she competed at the 2026 Asian Games and won a gold medal in the skeet team event, along with Jiang Yiting and Che Yufei, with an Asian Games record total of 357. In November 2026, she competed at the 2026 ISSF World Shooting Championships and won a gold medal in the skeet team event. She also won a bronze medal in the skeet event.
