= Qatar at the 2026 Asian Games =

- IOC code: QAT
- NOC: Qatar Olympic Committee

in Aichi–Nagoya, Japan September 19 – October 4, 2026
- Competitors: 254 in 28 sports
- Medals Ranked 14th: Gold 6 Silver 6 Bronze 6 Total 18

Asian Games appearances (overview)
- 1978; 1982; 1986; 1990; 1994; 1998; 2002; 2006; 2010; 2014; 2018; 2022; 2026

Qatar competed at the 2026 Asian Games in Aichi Prefecture and Nagoya, Japan from September 19 to October 4, 2026.

With Doha hosting the 2030 Asian Games, a Qatari segment was performed at the closing ceremony. Olympic and Asian Games champion Mutaz Barsham was featured at the handover segment.

== Medalists ==
The following Qatar competitors won medals at the Games.

Medal	Name	Sport	Event	Date
Gold	Rashid Saleh Al-Athba	Shooting	Men's skeet	23 September
Gold	Nasser Al-Attiyah; Rashid Saleh Al-Athba; Ali Ahmed Al-Ishaq	Shooting	Men's team skeet	23 September
Silver	Abdelrahman Abdelhamid	Karate	Men's 60 kg	20 September
Silver	Qatar men's national 3x3 team: Mohammed Abbasher; Mubarak Jama; Nazar Mahmoud; Hamad Mousa	3x3 basketball	Men	25 September
Bronze	Abdulla Babikr	Karate	Men's 84 kg	22 September

== Competitors ==
The following is a list of the number of competitors representing Qatar that will participate at the Asian Games:

Sport	Men	Women	Total
3x3 basketball	4	4	8
Archery	2	3	5
Athletics	39	7	46
Basketball	12	0	12
Beach volleyball	4	4	8
Boxing	2	0	2
Cycling	5	2	7
Equestrian	10	0	10
Esports	3	0	3
Fencing	8	1	9
Football	23	0	23
Golf	3	1	4
Gymnastics	2	1	3
Handball	16	0	16
Judo	0	2	2
Ju-jitsu	4	0	4
Karate	3	0	3
Padel	4	4	8
Sailing	1	0	1
Shooting	12	12	24
Squash	4	0	4
Swimming	8	0	8
Table tennis	5	5	10
Taewondo	0	2	2
Tennis	2	4	6
Volleyball	12	12	24
Weightlifting	2	1	3
Wrestling	2	0	2
Total	190	64	254

== Basketball ==
Summary

Team	Event	Group Stage				Quarterfinals	Semifinals	Final / BM	
Team	Event	Opposition Score	Opposition Score	Opposition Score	Rank	Opposition Score	Opposition Score	Opposition Score	Rank
Qatar men's	Men's 5x5 tournament	Iran; W 59–53	Jordan; L 65–76	Chinese Taipei; L 69–91	4	Did not advance			10
Qatar men's	Men's 3x3 tournament	Indonesia; W 10–7	Chinese Taipei; W 18–15	Bahrain; W 21–15	1 Q	Mongolia; W 18–14	Iran; W 14–11	South Korea; L 10–19	2nd place, silver medalist(s)
Qatar women's	Women's 3x3 tournament	Sri Lanka; L 16–19	China; L 3–21	Kazakhstan; L 8–17	4	Did not advance			14

=== Men's 5x5 tournament ===
Team roster

- Moustafa Fouda
- Mike Lewis II
- Mahmoud Darwish
- Abdulrahman Saad
- Seydou Ndoye
- Abdulla Mousa
- Mohammed Abbasher
- Ousmanediatta Dieng
- Abdelrahman Abdelhaleem
- Dejan Janjić
- Aladji Magassa
- Oussama Arfa

Preliminary Rounds – Group B

Pos	Team	Pld	W	L	PF	PA	PD	Pts	Qualification
1	Iran	3	2	1	206	196	+10	5 (Note: Iran 1–0 Chinese Taipei)	Quarterfinals
2	Chinese Taipei	3	2	1	243	221	+22	5	Quarterfinals
3	Jordan	3	1	2	224	229	−5	4 (Note: Jordan 1–0 Qatar)	Quarterfinals
4	Qatar	3	1	2	193	220	−27	4	

Source: AsianGames2026.org
Notes:

10 September 2026
10:00

Report
Box score

Iran	53–59	Qatar
Scoring by quarter: 10–10, 11–21, 13–13, 19–15
Pts: Aghajanpour 15; Rebs: Kazemi, Zangeneh 7 Asts: three players 3		Pts: Lewis 21; Rebs: Janjić 9 Asts: Janjić, Saad 3

Aichi International Arena, Nagoya
Referees: Rabah Noujaim (LBN), Nattapong Jontapa (THA), Shigeyuki Arisawa (JPN)

12 September 2026
13:00

Report
Box score

Qatar	65–76	Jordan
Scoring by quarter: 14–19, 16–23, 19–22, 16–12
Pts: Lewis 14; Rebs: Saad 6 Asts: Lewis 4		Pts: Buford 20; Rebs: Hussein 9 Asts: three players 5

Aichi International Arena, Nagoya
Attendance: 8,132
Referees: Rabah Noujaim (LIB), Yuen Chun Yip (HKG), Budi Marfan (INA)

13 September 2026
13:00

Report
Box score

Chinese Taipei	91–69	Qatar
Scoring by quarter: 26–12, 20–15, 22–18, 23–24
Pts: Lin 21; Rebs: Gilbeck 9 Asts: Chen Y. 9		Pts: Janjić 15; Rebs: Arfa, Janjić 9 Asts: Saad 4

Aichi International Arena, Nagoya
Attendance: 8,355
Referees: Wissam Zein (SYR) , Shigeyuki Arisawa (JPN), Lee Ji-youn (KOR)

=== Men's 3x3 tournament ===
Preliminary Rounds – Group C

Pos	Team	Pld	W	L	PF	PA	PD	Pts	Qualification
1	Qatar	3	3	0	49	37	+12	6	Quarterfinals
2	Chinese Taipei	3	2	1	58	37	+21	5	Play-ins
3	Indonesia	3	1	2	38	42	−4	4	Play-ins
4	Bahrain	3	0	3	27	56	−29	3	

Source: asiangames2026.org

21 September
18:30

Report

Qatar	10–7	Indonesia
Pts: Mousa 6		Pts: Junior 5

Kinjō-futō Station Square, Nagoya
Referees: Alexandr Rulyov (KAZ), Kim Gain (KOR)

21 September
20:10

Report

Qatar	18–15	Chinese Taipei
Pts: Mousa 10		Pts: Chang 9

Kinjō-futō Station Square, Nagoya
Referees: Alexandr Rulyov (KAZ), Neoh Yuen (MAS)

23 September
14:30

Report

Qatar	21–15	Bahrain
Pts: Mousa 8		Pts: Alansari 6

Kinjō-futō Station Square, Nagoya
Referees: Li Caiyan (CHN), Kim Gain (KOR)

Quarterfinals

24 September
20:10

Report

Qatar	18–14	Mongolia
Pts: Mousa 11		Pts: Gantsolmon 7

Kinjō-futō Station Square, Nagoya
Referees: Li Caiyan (CHN), Kim Ga-in (KOR)

Semifinals

25 September
14:15

Qatar	14–11	Iran
Pts: Mousa 12		Pts: Momeni 4

Kinjō-futō Station Square, Nagoya
Referees: Nie Cong (CHN), Alexandr Rulyov (KAZ)

Final

25 September
19:30

Report

South Korea	19–10	Qatar
Pts: Lee Ju-yeong 9		Pts: Mousa 4

Kinjō-futō Station Square, Nagoya
Referees: Su Yu-yen (TPE), Neoh Yuen (MAS)

=== Women's 3x3 tournament ===
Preliminary Rounds – Group A

Pos	Team	Pld	W	L	PF	PA	PD	Pts	Qualification
1	China	3	3	0	60	17	+43	6	Quarterfinals
2	Kazakhstan	3	2	1	50	34	+16	5	Play-ins
3	Sri Lanka	3	1	2	29	58	−29	4	Play-ins
4	Qatar	3	0	3	27	57	−30	3	

Source: 2026 Asian Games

22 September
18:05

Report

Qatar	16–19	Sri Lanka
Pts: Gasir 8		Pts: Dharmasena 10

Kinjō-futō Station Square, Nagoya
Referees: Li Caiyan, (CHN)Liu Chee (MAS)

22 September
19:20

Report

China	21–3	Qatar
Pts: Zhang 7		Pts: Taweel 2

Kinjō-futō Station Square, Nagoya
Referees: Kim Ga-in (KOR), Danusorn Laosaksam (THA)

23 September
19:45

Report

Kazakhstan	17–8	Qatar
Pts: Yerkebay 8		Pts: Al-Maadeed, Gasir 3

Kinjō-futō Station Square, Nagoya
Referees: Rina Nozaki (JPN), Liu Chee (MAS)

== Football ==
Summary

Key:

- A.E.T – After extra time.
- P – Match decided by penalty-shootout.

Team	Event	Group Stage			Quarterfinals	Semifinals	Final / BM	
Team	Event	Opposition Score	Opposition Score	Rank	Opposition Score	Opposition Score	Opposition Score	Rank
Qatar men's under-23	Men's tournament	South Korea; L 1–4	Saudi Arabia; L 0–2	3	Did not advance			

=== Men's tournament ===
Team squads

Qatar announced their final squad on 11 September.

Head coach: (Spain) José Ángel Ziganda

No.	Pos.	Player	Date of birth (age)	Caps	Goals	Club
	GK	Abubaker Osman	25 September 2005 (age 21)	1	0	(Qatar Football Association) Qatar U-23
	GK	Jalal Amir	26 February 2006 (age 20)	0	0	(Qatar Football Association) Qatar U-23
	GK	Mohamed Lingliz	9 March 2005 (age 21)	0	0	(Qatar Football Association) Al Ahli
	DF	Marwan Sherif	1 March 2006 (age 20)	4	0	(Qatar Football Association) Al-Arabi
	DF	Zaid Burhan	4 September 2005 (age 21)	0	0	(Qatar Football Association) Qatar U-23
	DF	Ghanem Al-Minhali	27 June 2006 (age 20)	0	0	(Qatar Football Association) Al-Ahli
	DF	Ali Shahabi	29 January 2006 (age 20)	0	0	(Qatar Football Association) Qatar U-23
	DF	Aatif El-Amin	21 February 2006 (age 20)	0	0	(Qatar Football Association) Qatar U-23
	DF	Yousef Al-Nizami	16 April 2006 (age 20)	0	0	(Qatar Football Association) Qatar U-23
	DF	Al-Waleed Al-Hausawi	1 October 2006 (age 20)	0	0	(Qatar Football Association) Qatar U-23
	DF	Qais Al-Rawi	5 January 2007 (age 19)	0	0	(Qatar Football Association) Al-Rayyan
	MF	Moath Taha	12 October 2005 (age 20)	7	1	(Qatar Football Association) Qatar U-23
	MF	Yamaan Jarrar	28 November 2005 (age 20)	2	0	(Qatar Football Association) Qatar U-23
	MF	Ziyad Fadi	3 July 2005 (age 21)	0	0	(Qatar Football Association) Lusail
	MF	Nawaf Al-Yahri	3 January 2006 (age 20)	0	0	(Qatar Football Association) Qatar U-23
	MF	Faisal Al-Mukahal	21 April 2006 (age 20)	0	0	(Qatar Football Association) Al-Sadd
	MF	Mohamed Ali Chakari	7 May 2006 (age 20)	0	0	(Qatar Football Association) Qatar U-23
	MF	Bassam Adel Eid	25 September 2006 (age 20)	0	0	(Qatar Football Association) Qatar U-23
	MF	Tameem Al-Qadi	19 May 2008 (age 18)	0	0	(Qatar Football Association) Al Sadd
	FW	Mohamed Khaled Gouda	26 January 2005 (age 21)	14	1	(Qatar Football Association) Al-Arabi
	FW	Mohamed Hani Faragalla	10 October 2005 (age 20)	1	0	(Qatar Football Association) Qatar U-23
	FW	Nasser Bahiker	26 August 2006 (age 20)	0	0	(Qatar Football Association) Qatar U-23
	FW	Jassem Al-Hamad	8 November 2006 (age 19)	0	0	(Qatar Football Association) Qatar U-23

Preliminary Rounds – Group D

Pos	Team	Pld	W	D	L	GF	GA	GD	Pts	Qualification
1	South Korea	2	2	0	0	6	1	+5	6	Advance to knockout stage
2	Saudi Arabia	2	1	0	1	2	2	0	3	Advance to knockout stage
3	Qatar	2	0	0	2	1	6	−5	0	

Source: Aichi–Nagoya 26
15 September 2026
19:30

Qatar	1–4	South Korea
Sherif 85'	Report	Eom Ji-sung 7', 20', 45+1'; Kim Myung-jun 66'

Paloma Mizuho Rugby Stadium, Nagoya
Attendance: 1,633
Referee: Adam Kersey (Australia)

18 September 2026
19:30

Saudi Arabia	2–0	Qatar
Barnawi 38'; Houssa 47'	Report

Paloma Mizuho Rugby Stadium, Nagoya
Attendance: 1,214
Referee: Sultan Al-Hammadi (United Arab Emirates)

== Handball ==
Team	Event	Group stage				Quarterfinal	Semifinal	Final / BM	
Team	Event	Opposition Score	Opposition Score	Opposition Score	Rank	Opposition Score	Opposition Score	Opposition Score	Rank
Qatar men's	Men's tournament	Hong Kong; W 40–17	China; W 30–25	Japan; W 37–28	1 Q	Iran; W 31–25	South Korea; W 32–30	Bahrain; L 32–33	2nd place, silver medalist(s)

=== Men's tournament ===
Team rosters

- Ahmad Madadi (7)
- Youssef Benali (41)
- Saifdinne Dhib (12)
- Malek Soussou (69)
- Abdelrahman Abdalla (22)
- Rafael Capote (9)
- Frankis Carol (10)
- Abdulrazzaq Murad (11)
- Eldar Memišević (13)
- Nasreddine Megdich (15)
- Firaz Zemzemi (19)
- Ahmed Abdelrhem (33)
- Amine Guehis (44)
- Mohamed Hamam (77)
- Ameen Zakkar (94)
- Ebrahim Ebaid (98)

Group Stage – Group A

Pos	Team	Pld	W	D	L	GF	GA	GD	Pts	Qualification
1	Qatar	3	3	0	0	107	70	+37	6	Quarterfinals
2	Japan (H)	3	2	0	1	103	81	+22	4	Quarterfinals
3	China	3	1	0	2	90	87	+3	2	Quarterfinals
4	Hong Kong	3	0	0	3	60	122	−62	0	Quarterfinals

Source: asiangames2026.org
(H) Hosts

20 September 2026; 17:30	Hong Kong	17–40	Qatar	Toyoda Gosei Memorial Gymnasium; Referees: Ali, Al-Aradi (BHR)
20 September 2026; 17:30	Lin 5	(8–19)	Marzo, Megdich 7	Toyoda Gosei Memorial Gymnasium; Referees: Ali, Al-Aradi (BHR)
20 September 2026; 17:30	1× (suspension)	Report	3× (suspension)	Toyoda Gosei Memorial Gymnasium; Referees: Ali, Al-Aradi (BHR)

21 September 2026; 19:30	China	25–30	Qatar	Toyoda Gosei Memorial Gymnasium; Referees: Pak, Cha (KOR)
21 September 2026; 19:30	Sun 6	(15–15)	Marzo 8	Toyoda Gosei Memorial Gymnasium; Referees: Pak, Cha (KOR)
21 September 2026; 19:30	1× (yellow card) 7× (suspension) 5× (red card)	Report	1× (yellow card) 6× (suspension)	Toyoda Gosei Memorial Gymnasium; Referees: Pak, Cha (KOR)

25 September 2026; 15:30	Qatar	37–28	Japan	Kasugai City Gymnasium; Referees: Ismoilov, Ismoilov (UZB)
25 September 2026; 15:30	Marzo 9	(18–13)	Tsutaya, Yoshino 5	Kasugai City Gymnasium; Referees: Ismoilov, Ismoilov (UZB)
25 September 2026; 15:30	4× (suspension)	Report	2× (suspension) 1× (red card)	Kasugai City Gymnasium; Referees: Ismoilov, Ismoilov (UZB)

Quarterfinals

26 September 2026; 16:00	Qatar	31–25	Iran	Kasugai City Gymnasium; Referees: Furukawa, Murata (JPN)
26 September 2026; 16:00	Guehis 7	(13–14)	Asari, Enayati 6	Kasugai City Gymnasium; Referees: Furukawa, Murata (JPN)
26 September 2026; 16:00	1× (yellow card) 4× (suspension)	Report	1× (yellow card) 4× (suspension) 1× (red card)	Kasugai City Gymnasium; Referees: Furukawa, Murata (JPN)

Semifinals

28 September 2026; 17:30	South Korea	30–32	Qatar	Toyoda Gosei Memorial Gymnasium; Referees: Gheisarian, Gheisarian (IRI)
28 September 2026; 17:30	Kim Jin-y. 7	(16–16)	Madadi 8	Toyoda Gosei Memorial Gymnasium; Referees: Gheisarian, Gheisarian (IRI)
28 September 2026; 17:30	1× (yellow card) 1× (suspension)	Report	1× (yellow card) 5× (suspension) 1× (red card)	Toyoda Gosei Memorial Gymnasium; Referees: Gheisarian, Gheisarian (IRI)

== Karate ==
Athlete	Event	Round of 16	Quarterfinals	Semifinals	Repechage	Final / BM	
Athlete	Event	Opposition Result	Opposition Result	Opposition Result	Opposition Result	Opposition Result	Rank
Abdelrahman Abdelhamid	Men's –60 kg	Turakhonov (UZB); W 4–1	Chu (VIE); W 10–4	Hari Sankar (MAS); W 7–1	—N/a	Shaaban (KUW); W 8–0	2nd place, silver medalist(s)
Yaman Al-Natsheh	Men's –67 kg	Islam (BAN); W 8–3	Shih C-c (TPE); L 5–6	Did not advance			
Abdulla Babikr	Men's –84 kg	—N/a	Asiabari (IRI); L 1–4	Did not advance	—N/a	Al-Khatib (PLE); W 8–0	3rd place, bronze medalist(s)

== Shooting ==
=== Men ===
Individual

Athlete	Event	Qualification		Final	
Athlete	Event	Points	Rank	Points	Rank
Khalid Al-Saiba	10 m air pistol	557-16x	52	Did not advance	
Mohammed Al-Yafei	10 m air pistol	555-9x	55	Did not advance	
Nasser Al-Senaid	10 m air pistol	558-11x	50	Did not advance	
Abdullah Al-Sunaidi	10 m air rifle	616.8	36	Did not advance	
Abdullah Al-Sunaidi	50 m rifle 3 position	568-20x	32	Did not advance	
Abdulrahman Al-Sulaiti	10 m air rifle	616.0	38	Did not advance	
Khalid Sharshani	10 m air rifle	616.8	37	Did not advance	
Khalid Sharshani	50 m rifle 3 position	561-18x	38	Did not advance	
Angelo Scalzone	Trap	113	20	Did not advance	
Mohammed Al-Rumaihi	Trap	117	9	Did not advance	
Saeed Abusharib	Trap	119	4 Q	11	6
Ali Al-Ishaq	Skeet	114	20	Did not advance	
Nasser Al-Attiyah	Skeet	120	3 Q	19	5
Rashid Saleh Al-Athba	Skeet	119	4 Q	34 AR	1st place, gold medalist(s)

Team

Athlete	Event	Final	
Athlete	Event	Points	Rank
Khalid Al-Saiba; Mohammed Al-Yafei; Nasser Al-Senaid	10 m air pistol	1670-36x	14
Abdullah Al-Sunaidi; Abdulrahman Al-Sulaiti; Khalid Sharshani	10 m air rifle	1849.6	12
Angelo Scalzone; Mohammed Al-Rumaihi; Saeed Abusharib	Trap	349	2nd place, silver medalist(s)
Ali Al-Ishaq; Nasser Al-Attiyah; Rashid Saleh Al-Athba	Skeet	353	1st place, gold medalist(s)

=== Women ===
Individual

Athlete	Event	Qualification		Final	
Athlete	Event	Points	Rank	Points	Rank
Aisha Al-Abdulla	10 m air pistol	DNS			
Duaa Habib	10 m air pistol	560-12x	39	Did not advance	
Duaa Habib	25 m pistol	571	25	Did not advance	
Salma Almass	10 m air pistol	DNS			
Almaha Al-Ali	10 m air rifle	613.5	51	Did not advance	
Almaha Al-Ali	50 m rifle 3 position	561-17x	44	Did not advance	
Dalal Al-Qebaisi	10 m air rifle	DNS		Did not advance	
Retaj Al-Yafei	10 m air rifle	620.8	39	Did not advance	
Kholoud Al-Khalaf	Trap	103	25	Did not advance	
Metha Al-Binali	Trap	103	26	Did not advance	
Ray Bassil	Trap	118	2 Q	16	4
Hajar Mohammed	Skeet	102	21	Did not advance	
Reem Al-Sharshani	Skeet	111	10	Did not advance	
Sarah Ghulam Mohammed	Skeet	101	23	Did not advance	

Team

Athlete	Event	Final	
Athlete	Event	Points	Rank
Aisha Al-Abdulla; Duaa Habib; Salma Almass	10 m air pistol	DNF	
Almaha Al-Ali; Dalal Al-Qebaisi; Retaj Al-Yafei	10 m air rifle	DNF	
Kholoud Al-Khalaf; Metha Al-Binali; Ray Bassil	Trap	324	4
Hajar Mohammed; Reem Al-Sharshani; Sarah Ghulam Mohammed	Skeet	314	6

=== Mixed ===
Team

Athlete	Event	Qualification		Final	
Athlete	Event	Points	Rank	Points	Rank
Duaa Habib; Khalid Al-Saiba	10 m air pistol	563-12x	15	Did not advance	
Abdullah Al-Sunaidi; Retaj Al-Yafei	10 m air rifle	621.6	10	Did not advance	
Mohammed Al-Rumaihi; Ray Bassil	Trap	139	2 Q	32	2nd place, silver medalist(s)
Rashid Saleh Al-Athba; Reem Al-Sharshani	Skeet	145	1 Q	18	4

== Table tennis ==
Men

Athlete	Event	Round of 64	Round of 32	Round of 16	Quarterfinal	Semifinal	Final	
Athlete	Event	Opposition Result	Opposition Result	Opposition Result	Opposition Result	Opposition Result	Opposition Result	Rank
Abdullah Abdulhussein	Singles	Vongsa (LAO); W 4–1	Quek (SGP); L 0–4	Did not advance				
Mohammed Ahussein	Singles	Junindra (INA); W 4–0	Harimoto (JPN); L 0–4	Did not advance				
Abdullah Abdulhussein; Mohammed Ahussein	Doubles	Pratama / Negara (INA); L 0–3	Did not advance					
Ahmed Korani; Sultan Al-Kuwari	Doubles	Ankhbayar / Myandal (MGL); W 3–1	Wong / Choong (MAS); L 2–3	Did not advance				

Women

Athlete	Event	Round of 32	Round of 16	Quarterfinal	Semifinal	Final	
Athlete	Event	Opposition Result	Opposition Result	Opposition Result	Opposition Result	Opposition Result	Rank
Aia Mohamed	Singles	Wang MY (CHN); L 0–4	Did not advance				
Maryam Ali	Singles	Sun YS (CHN); L 0–4	Did not advance				
Aia Mohamed; Maryam Ali	Doubles	Nagasaki / Mende (JPN); L 0–3	Did not advance				
Fawziya Al-Malki; Sarrinah Shaikh	Doubles	Kim N-y / Lee E-h (KOR); L 0–3	Did not advance				

Mixed

Athlete	Event	Round of 64	Round of 32	Round of 16	Quarterfinal	Semifinal	Final	
Athlete	Event	Opposition Result	Opposition Result	Opposition Result	Opposition Result	Opposition Result	Opposition Result	Rank
Abdullah Abdulhussein; Maryam Ali	Doubles	Kulappuwawadu / Swarna (SRI); L 1–3	Did not advance					
Aia Mohamed; Mohammed Ahussein	Doubles	Bye	Lim J-h / Shin Y-b (KOR); L 0–3	Did not advance				

Team

Athlete	Event	Group stage				Round of 16	Quarterfinal	Semifinal	Final	
Athlete	Event	Opposition Score	Opposition Score	Opposition Score	Rank	Opposition Score	Opposition Score	Opposition Score	Opposition Score	Rank
Abdullah Abdulhussein; Ahmed Korani; Mohammed Ahussein; Rawad Al-Naser; Sultan Al-Kuwari	Men's	China; L 0–3	Macau; W 3–2	—N/a	2 Q	Hong Kong; L 0–3	Did not advance			
Aia Mohamed; Fawziya Al-Makli; Maryam Ali; Noora Al-Abri; Sarrinah Shaikh	Women's	Thailand; L 0–3	Lebanon; L 2–3	Hong Kong; L 0–3	4	Did not advance				

== Volleyball ==
=== Beach ===
Athletes	Event	Preliminary round				Round of 16	Quarterfinal	Semifinal	Final / BM	
Athletes	Event	Opposition Score	Opposition Score	Opposition Score	Rank	Opposition Score	Opposition Score	Opposition Score	Opposition Score	Rank
Ahmed Tijan; Cherif Younousse	Men's	Abdilla / Francisco (PHI); W 2–0 (21–7, 21–10)	Al-Jalaboubi / Al-Hashimi (OMA); W 2–0 (21–19, 21–19)	—N/a	1 Q	Nguyen / Tran (VIE); W 2–0 (21–9, 21–16)	Pourasgari / Aghajanighasab (IRI); W 2–0 (21–13, 22–20)	Taovato / Tipjan (THA); W 2–0 (23–21, 21–12)	Efendi / Cahyono (INA); W 2–1 (19–21, 21–16, 15–8)	1st place, gold medalist(s)
Musa Alkeer Mou; Mohamed Zainelabedin	Men's	Oh J-t / Bae S-b (KOR); W 2–0 (21–13, 21–9)	Andibuduge / Randunu Pathirunnahalage (SRI); W 2–1 (21–10, 16–21, 15–10)	Taovato / Tipjan (THA); L 0–2 (14–21, 19–21)	2 Q	Song / Wang (CHN); L 0–2 (13–21, 16–21)	Did not advance			9
Haya Ashraf Abuissa; Leyla Bahmanzadeh	Women's	Ito / Sawame (JPN); L 0–2 (7–21, 3–21)	Karimova / Ryukhova (KAZ); L 0–2 (7–21, 6–21)	—N/a	3	Did not advance				
Malak Hashim; Sheqaf Ismail	Women's	Seehawong / Mungkhon (THA); L 0–2 (1–21, 1–21)	Wong MC / Tsang NL (HKG); L 0–2 (6–21, 11–21)	Alawaththage / Kumbure Gedara (SRI); L 0–2 (7–21, 8–21)	4	Did not advance				

=== Indoor ===
Summary

Team	Event	Group stage				Quarterfinals	Semifinals	Final / BM	
Team	Event	Opposition Score	Opposition Score	Opposition Score	Rank	Opposition Score	Opposition Score	Opposition Score	Rank
Qatar men's	Men's tournament	Hong Kong; W 3–1	Vietnam; W 3–0	India; L 2–3	2 Q	Japan; L 0–3	Classification 5th–8th Thailand; L 1–3	7th place match South Korea; L 0–3	8
Qatar women's	Women's tournament	Vietnam; L 0–3	South Korea; L 0–3	Hong Kong; L 0–3	4 C	Philippines; L 0–3	Did not advance	Kyrgyzstan; L 0–3	14

==== Men's tournament ====
Team roster

- Yousef Al-Yaffai
- Mohamed Waleed Widatalla
- Mohamed Ibrahim
- Naji Abukhiarah
- Mahdi Badreddin Sammoud
- Papemaguette Diagne
- Abdullah Hassanein
- Abdallah Ibrahim Nassim
- Abdelrahman Bakry
- Mubarak Musa Thiik Madut
- Ahmed Abdelrahim
- Mohammed Alsharshani

Group play

Pos	Team	Pld	W	L	Pts	SW	SL	SR	SPW	SPL	SPR	Qualification
1	India	3	3	0	8	9	2	4.500	275	246	1.118	Quarterfinals
2	Qatar	3	2	1	7	8	4	2.000	297	280	1.061	Quarterfinals
3	Vietnam	3	1	2	3	3	7	0.429	230	238	0.966	Classification 9th–16th
4	Hong Kong	3	0	3	0	2	9	0.222	234	272	0.860	Classification 9th–16th

Source: asiangames2026.org
Rules for classification: Tiebreakers

==== Women's tournament ====
Team roster

- Dana Aboueita (3)
- Ludan Elwaleed Eisa (10)
- Aisha Sultan Al-Alawi (2)
- Penda Fatma Gadiaga (25)
- Janna Mabrouk (22)
- Meriem Mouhoub (9)
- Tasneem Ali (18)
- Sumaia Al-Madhoun (15)
- Almayasa Deyab (14)
- Lamis Al-Salman (1)
- Nelly Shalaby (7)
- Lujain Mahmoud (16)

Group play

Pos	Team	Pld	W	L	Pts	SW	SL	SR	SPW	SPL	SPR	Qualification
1	South Korea	3	3	0	9	9	1	9.000	251	157	1.599	Quarterfinals
2	Vietnam	3	2	1	6	7	3	2.333	238	176	1.352	Quarterfinals
3	Hong Kong	3	1	2	3	3	6	0.500	177	179	0.989	Classification 9th–12th
4	Qatar	3	0	3	0	0	9	0.000	71	225	0.316	Classification 9th–14th

Source: asiangames2026.org
Rules for classification: Tiebreakers

== Wrestling ==
Qatar entered two male wrestlers.

Key:

- VT (ranking points: 5–0 or 0–5) – Victory by fall.
- VB (ranking points: 5–0 or 0–5) – Victory by injury (VF for forfeit, VA for withdrawal or disqualification)
- PP (ranking points: 3–1 or 1–3) – Decision by points – the loser with technical points.
- PO (ranking points: 3–0 or 0–3) – Decision by points – the loser without technical points.
- ST (ranking points: 4–0 or 0–4) – Great superiority – the loser without technical points and a margin of victory of at least 8 (Greco-Roman) or 10 (freestyle) points.
- SP (ranking points: 4–1 or 1–4) – Technical superiority – the loser with technical points and a margin of victory of at least 8 (Greco-Roman) or 10 (freestyle) points.

Greco-Roman

Athlete	Event	Round of 16	Quarterfinal	Semifinal	Repechage	Final / BM	
Athlete	Event	Opposition Result	Opposition Result	Opposition Result	Opposition Result	Opposition Result	Rank
Aref Mohammadi	Men's −60 kg						
Shahin Badaghimofrad	Men's −77 kg						
