= Darshna Rathore =

Indian sport shooter

Personal information
- Nationality: Indian
- Born: 3 September 2001 (age 25)
- Height: 1.67 m (5 ft 6 in)
Medal record
Women's shooting
Representing India
Asian Championships
Gold medal – first place	2023 Changwon	Mixed skeet team
Bronze medal – third place	2019 Doha	Skeet team

Darshna Rathore (born 3 September 2001) is an Indian sport shooter. She competes in the skeet discipline. She is part of the Indian shooting team at the Asian Games, Hangzhou, China. She was part of the Indian women's skeet team, along with Parinaaz Dhaliwal, and Ganemat Sekhon that finished fourth in the Asian Games shooting competitions.

Darshana won the bronze after equalling the National record score of 120 as she qualified for the six-woman final in her first World Cup at Almaty.

== Early life ==
Darshna hails from Rajasthan. She works with the Rajasthan Police.

== Career ==
- 2023: In May, she won bronze at the ISSF Astana Shotgun World Cup. In the qualifying, she made it to the six-woman final in second spot after equalling the national record of 120.
- 2023: She made her debut for senior India and won her first World Cup medal winning a bronze medal at the World Cup in Almaty.
- 2023: She took part in the skeet event at the Baku World Championship.
- 2023: In June, she took part in the Junior World Cup event at Suhl, Germany.
- 2022: She represented India in the skeet team event and individual event at the Osijek World Championship.
- 2021: In November, edged out India's top-ranked women's Skeet shooter Ganemat Sekhon of Punjab 50–46 to win her maiden National title.
- 2019: She took part in the Lonato Junior World Championships women's skeet and mixed skeet events.
