= Isarapa Imprasertsuk =

Thai sport shooter (born 1995)

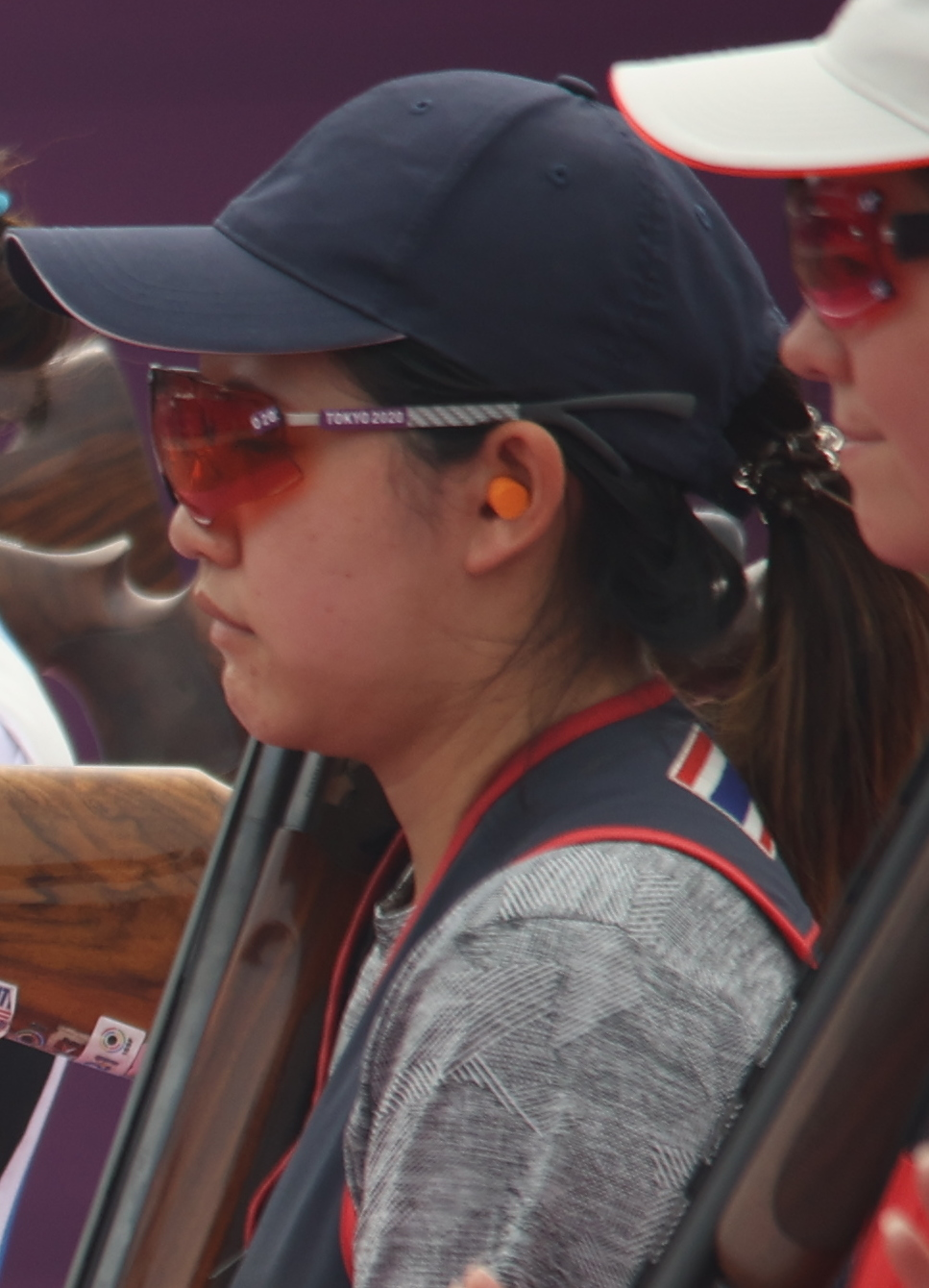
- Isarapa Imprasertsuk at the 2020 Summer Olympics

Personal information
- Nationality: Thai
- Born: 11 May 1995 (age 31) Bangkok, Thailand

Sport
- Sport: Shooting
Medal record
Women's shooting
Representing Thailand
Asian Games
Silver medal – second place	2026 Aichi–Nagoya	Skeet
Bronze medal – third place	2010 Guangzhou	Skeet team
Bronze medal – third place	2014 Incheon	Skeet team
Bronze medal – third place	2022 Hangzhou	Skeet team
Asian Championships
Gold medal – first place	2012 Patiala	Skeet team
Gold medal – first place	2015 Kuwait City	Skeet
Gold medal – first place	2015 Kuwait City	Skeet team
Gold medal – first place	2018 Kuwait City	Skeet team
Silver medal – second place	2016 Abu Dhabi	Skeet
Silver medal – second place	2019 Doha	Skeet team
Silver medal – second place	2019 Almaty	Skeet
Silver medal – second place	2019 Almaty	Skeet team
Silver medal – second place	2022 Almaty	Skeet team
Bronze medal – third place	2009 Almaty	Skeet team
Bronze medal – third place	2011 Kuala Lumpur	Skeet team
Bronze medal – third place	2013 Almaty	Skeet
Bronze medal – third place	2013 Almaty	Skeet team
Bronze medal – third place	2016 Abu Dhabi	Skeet team
Bronze medal – third place	2023 Changwon	Skeet team

Isarapa Imprasertsuk (born 11 May 1995) is a Thai sport shooter, born in Bangkok. She won a silver medal in skeet at the 2016 Asian Shotgun Championships.

She qualified to represent Thailand at the 2020 Summer Olympics in Tokyo 2021, where she placed fourth in women's skeet.
