= Gurjoat Siingh Khangura =

Indian sport shooter (born 1994)

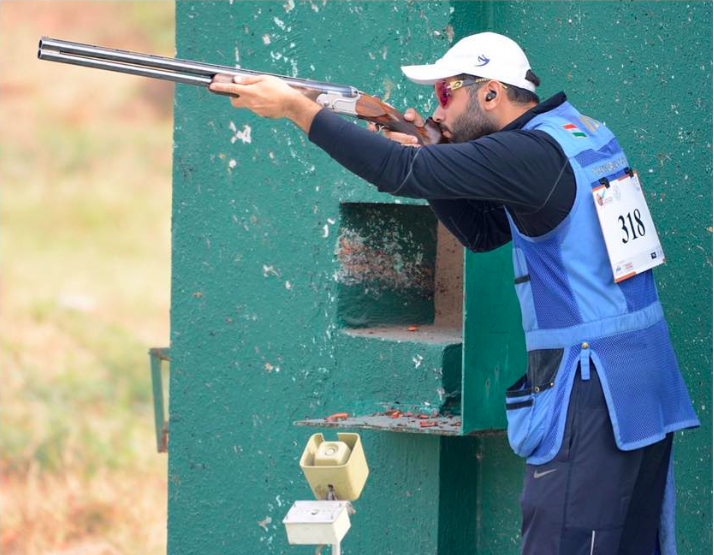

Personal information
- Nationality: Indian
- Born: 12 July 1994 (age 31) New Delhi, India

Sport
- Sport: Shooting
- Event: Skeet shooting
Medal record
Men's shooting
Representing India
Asian Championships
Gold medal – first place	2023 Changwon	Skeet team
Bronze medal – third place	2024 Kuwait City	Skeet team
Bronze medal – third place	2024 Kuwait City	Mixed skeet team

Gurjoat Siingh Khangura (born 12 July 1994) is an Indian sport shooter who competes in the skeet discipline.

== Personal ==
Khangura was born 12 July 1994 in New Delhi, India.

== Career ==
At the 2021 ISSF World Cup event in Cairo, Khangura won the bronze medal in the Men's Skeet Team Event with teammates Mairaj Ahmad Khan and Angad Vir Singh Bajwa. In New Delhi, at the ISSF Shooting World Cup 2021, Khangura won the gold medal in the Men's Skeet Team Event, once again shooting with teammates Khan and Bajwa.
