= Lyu Jianlin =

Chinese sport shooter (born 1996)

Personal information
- Born: 26 July 1996 (age 30) Sichuan, China

Sport
- Sport: Sports shooting
Medal record
Shooting
Representing China
Olympic Games
Bronze medal – third place	2024 Paris	Mixed skeet team
ISSF World Cup
Gold medal – first place	2024 Baku	Men's Skeet
Silver medal – second place	2022 Changwon	Men's Skeet team
Asian Games
Gold medal – first place	2026 Aichi–Nagoya	Mixed skeet team
Silver medal – second place	2026 Aichi–Nagoya	Skeet

Lyu Jianlin (born 26 July 1996) is a Chinese sport shooter. He is bronze medalist at the Summer Olympics.

== Career ==
Jianlin competed in the men's skeet event in 2024 and men's skeet team event in 2022 of the ISSF World Cup, where he won the gold and silver medal in these respective events.

He competed in the 2024 Summer Olympics, and with Jiang Yiting won a Bronze medal in mixed team skeet.
