= Zoya Kravchenko =

Kazakhstani sports shooter

Personal information
- Nationality: Kazakhstani
- Born: 24 May 1999 (age 27)

Sport
- Sport: Sports shooting
Medal record
Women's shooting
Representing Kazakhstan
Asian Games
Gold medal – first place	2022 Hangzhou	Skeet team
Asian Championships
Gold medal – first place	2022 Almaty	Skeet
Gold medal – first place	2022 Almaty	Skeet team
Silver medal – second place	2023 Changwon	Skeet team
Bronze medal – third place	2024 Kuwait City	Skeet team

Zoya Kravchenko (Зоя Алексеева Кравченко (Пискун), born 24 May 1999) is a Kazakhstani sports shooter. She competed in the women's skeet event at the 2020 Summer Olympics.
