= Assem Orynbay =

Kazakhstani sports shooter (born 1993)

Personal information
- Born: 7 September 1993 (age 33) Yntymak, Kazakhstan

Sport
- Sport: Sports shooting
Medal record
Women's shooting
Representing Kazakhstan
World Championships
Bronze medal – third place	2022 Osijek	Mixed skeet team
Asian Games
Gold medal – first place	2022 Hangzhou	Mixed skeet team
Gold medal – first place	2022 Hangzhou	Skeet team
Silver medal – second place	2026 Aichi–Nagoya	Skeet team
Bronze medal – third place	2022 Hangzhou	Skeet
Bronze medal – third place	2026 Aichi–Nagoya	Skeet
Asian Championships
Gold medal – first place	2022 Almaty	Team skeet
Silver medal – second place	2018 Kuwait City	Skeet
Silver medal – second place	2023 Changwon	Team skeet
Silver medal – second place	2024 Kuwait City	Mixed skeet team
Bronze medal – third place	2017 Astana	Team skeet
Bronze medal – third place	2018 Kuwait City	Team skeet
Bronze medal – third place	2019 Almaty	Skeet
Bronze medal – third place	2019 Almaty	Team skeet
Bronze medal – third place	2022 Almaty	Skeet
Bronze medal – third place	2024 Kuwait City	Team skeet

Assem Orynbay (Kazakh: Әсем Маратқызы Орынбай, born 7 September 1993) is a Kazakhstani sports shooter. She competed in the women's skeet event at the 2020 Summer Olympics. Orynbay also competed for Kazakhstan at the 2024 Summer Olympics in the women's skeet and mixed skeet team events.
