= Parinaaz Dhaliwal =

Indian skeet shooter (born 2001)

Personal information
- Born: 30 November 2001 (age 24) Barnala, Punjab, India

Sport
- Sport: Shooting
- Event: Skeet
Medal record
Women's skeet shooting
Representing India
Asian Games
Bronze medal – third place	2026 Aichi–Nagoya	Mixed team
Bronze medal – third place	2026 Aichi–Nagoya	Team

Parinaaz Dhaliwal (born 30 November 2001) is an Indian skeet shooter from Punjab. She won a bronze medal in the women's skeet team event along with Maheshwari Chauhan and Raiza Dhillon in the 2026 Asian Games.

== Career ==
In 2015, Dhaliwal expressed interest in shooting and asked her father Rattandeep Dhaliwal to get her a gun. Her father then, joined her for training at the New Moti Bagh Range at Patiala.

She is part of the Indian shooting team at the Asian Games, Hangzhou, China. She was part of the Indian women's skeet team, along with Darshna Rathore and Ganemat Sekhon that finished fourth in the Asian Games shooting competitions.

In November 2019, she became the Junior National champion in Skeet at the 63rd National Shooting Championship, New Delhi. In the same year, she was also part of the Indian team that won bronze at the Asian Shotgun Championships at Kazakhstan.

In 2021, she represented India in the ISSF World Cup at New Delhi. In May 2022, she was part of the Indian team that won the bronze at the ISSF Junior World Cup in Suhl, Germany.
