= Lee Jong-jun =

South Korean sport shooter

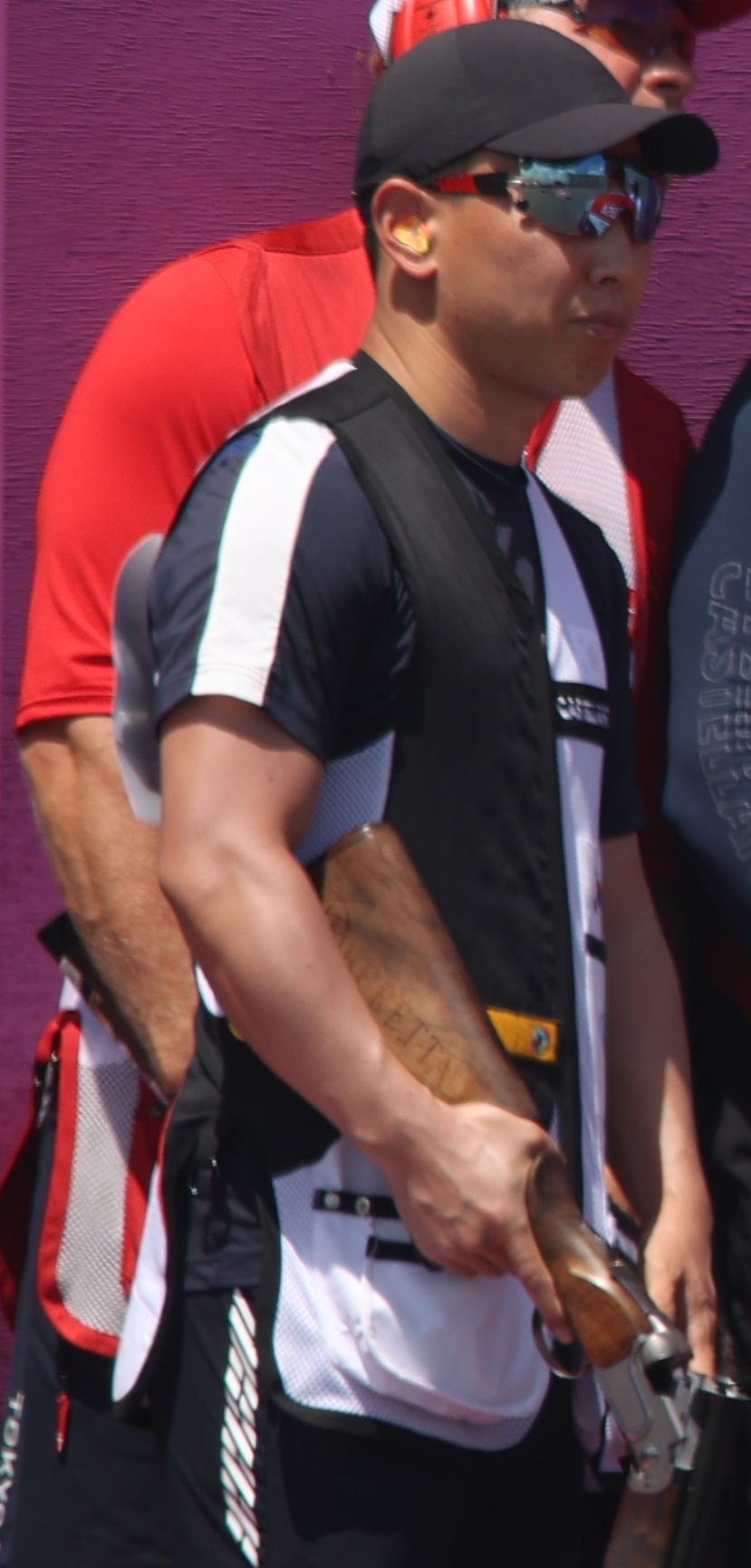
- Lee Jong-jun at the 2020 Summer Olympics

Personal information
- Born: 16 December 1989 (age 36) Seoul, South Korea

Sport
- Sport: Shooting
Medal record
Men's shooting
Representing South Korea
Asian Games
Silver medal – second place	2026 Aichi–Nagoya	Mixed team
Bronze medal – third place	2014 Incheon	Skeet team
Asian Championships
Silver medal – second place	2025 Shymkent	Skeet team

Lee Jong-jun (Korean: 이종준; Hanja: 李鍾準; born 16 December 1989) is a South Korean sport shooter. His achievements include a bronze medal in skeet team at the 2014 Asian Games. He represented South Korea at the 2020 Summer Olympics in Tokyo 2021, competing in men's skeet.
