= Rashid Saleh Al-Athba =

Qatari sport shooter (born 1987)

Rashid Hamad
Personal information
- Full name: Rashid Salih Hamad Al-Athba
- Nationality: Qatar
- Born: 18 October 1987 (age 38)
- Height: 1.82 m (6 ft 0 in)
- Weight: 78 kg (172 lb)

Sport
- Sport: Shooting
- Event: Skeet
Medal record
Men's shooting
Representing Qatar
World Championships
Bronze medal – third place	2022 Osijek	Skeet
Asian Games
Gold medal – first place	2026 Aichi–Nagoya	Skeet
Gold medal – first place	2026 Aichi–Nagoya	Skeet team
Silver medal – second place	2022 Hangzhou	Skeet team
Bronze medal – third place	2022 Hangzhou	Skeet mixed team
Asian Championships
Gold medal – first place	2012 Doha	Skeet team
Gold medal – first place	2019 Doha	Skeet team
Gold medal – first place	2023 Changwon	Skeet
Bronze medal – third place	2023 Changwon	Mixed skeet team
Bronze medal – third place	2025 Shymkent	Skeet team
Asian Shotgun Championships
Gold medal – first place	2022 Almaty	Skeet team
Silver medal – second place	2019 Almaty	Skeet team
Bronze medal – third place	2019 Almaty	Skeet

Rashid Salih Hamad Al-Athba (Arabic: راشد صالح حمد العتبه; born 18 October 1987) is a Qatari sport shooter. Hamad represented Qatar at the 2008 Summer Olympics in Beijing, where he competed in the men's skeet shooting, along with four-time Olympian Nasser Al-Attiyah. He finished only in thirty-seventh place for the two-day qualifying rounds, with a total score of 106 points. Hamad clinched a silver and a bronze in the skeet event at the 2022 Asian Games.
