= Maryam Hassani =

Bahraini sports shooter

Personal information
- Full name: Maryam Jamal Abdullatif Hassani
- Born: 8 October 1993 (age 32) Muharraq, Bahrain
- Height: 1.86 m (6 ft 1 in) (2022)
Medal record
Women's shooting
Representing Bahrain
Asian Championships
Bronze medal – third place	2024 Kuwait City	Mixed skeet team
Islamic Solidarity Games
Gold medal – first place	2017 Baku	Mixed skeet team
Bronze medal – third place	2021 Konya	Skeet

Maryam Hassani (Arabic: مريم حساني, born 8 October 1993) is a Bahraini sports shooter. She competed in the women's skeet event at the 2020 Summer Olympics.
