= Jiang Yiting =

Chinese sports shooter (born 2004)

Personal information
- Born: 1 August 2004 (age 22) Putian, Fujian, China

Sport
- Sport: Sports shooting
- Event: Skeet
Medal record
Women's shooting
Representing China
Olympic Games
Bronze medal – third place	2024 Paris	Mixed skeet team
World Championships
Gold medal – first place	2026 Doha	Skeet
Gold medal – first place	2026 Doha	Skeet team
Bronze medal – third place	2022 Osijek	Skeet team
World Cup
Gold medal – first place	2023 Cairo	Individual
Gold medal – first place	2025 Doha	Individual
Silver medal – second place	2026 Almaty	Individual
Bronze medal – third place	2025 Lonato	Individual
Asian Games
Gold medal – first place	2022 Hangzhou	Skeet
Gold medal – first place	2026 Aichi–Nagoya	Skeet
Gold medal – first place	2026 Aichi–Nagoya	Skeet team
Gold medal – first place	2026 Aichi–Nagoya	Mixed Skeet team
Silver medal – second place	2022 Hangzhou	Skeet team
Bronze medal – third place	2022 Hangzhou	Mixed Skeet team
Asian Championships
Gold medal – first place	2023 Changwon	Skeet team
Gold medal – first place	2024 Kuwait City	Mixed skeet team
Gold medal – first place	2025 Shymkent	Skeet
Gold medal – first place	2025 Shymkent	Skeet team
Gold medal – first place	2025 Shymkent	Mixed Skeet team
Silver medal – second place	2024 Kuwait City	Skeet team
Bronze medal – third place	2023 Changwon	Skeet

Jiang Yiting (Chinese: 江伊婷, romanized: Jiāng Yītíng; born 1 August 2004) is a Chinese sport shooter who competes in the skeet discipline. She has won multiple medals at the World Championships, Asian Championships, Asian Games and is a bronze medalist at the Summer Olympics.

== Career ==
Jiang competed in 2022 World Shotgun Championships and won a bronze medal in the women's team skeet event.

In April 2023, Jiang won her first World Cup gold by winning the women's skeet event at Cairo. In September 2023, she competed in the women's skeet, women's skeet team and mixed skeet team event of the Asian Games, where she won the gold, silver and bronze medal in these respective events. Two months later, she competed in the Asian Shooting Championships, where she won a gold medal in the skeet team event and a bronze medal in the skeet event.

In January 2024, Jiang competed at the Asian Shotgun Championships and won a silver medal in the skeet team and gold medal in the mixed skeet team. Several months later, she competed at the 2024 Summer Olympics and won a bronze medal alongside Lyu Jianlin in mixed team skeet.

In July 2025, Jiang won her second World Cup medal by winning the bronze medal at the Lonato round. The following month, she competed at the Asian Championships, where she won the gold medal in the At the World Cup Final, she won the gold medal with a perfect score.

In May 2026, Jiang won the silver medal World Cup round in Almaty. At the 2026 Asian Games in Aichi, she competed in the skeet, skeet team and mixed skeet team events and won a gold medal in all of them. At the 2026 ISSF World Shooting Championships in Doha, she won the gold medal in skeet.
