= Ganemat Sekhon =

Indian sport shooter

Personal information
- Full name: Ganemat Kaur Sekhon
- Nationality: India
- Born: 29 November 2000 (age 25) Chandigarh, India

Sport
- Sport: Shooting
- Event: Skeet shooting

Achievements and titles
- Personal best: 124 NR (2025)
Medal record
Women's skeet shooting
Representing India
World Cup
Gold medal – first place	2021 New Delhi	Mixed Team
Gold medal – first place	2023 Cairo	Mixed Team
Silver medal – second place	2021 New Delhi	Team
Silver medal – second place	2023 Almaty	Individual
Bronze medal – third place	2021 New Delhi	Individual
Asian Championships
Gold medal – first place	2024 Kuwait	Team
Silver medal – second place	2019 Doha	Mixed Team
Bronze medal – third place	2019 Doha	Team
Bronze medal – third place	2025 Shymkent	Mixed Team
Bronze medal – third place	2025 Shymkent	Team
Junior World Championships
Gold medal – first place	2021 Lima	Team
Silver medal – second place	2021 Lima	Individual
Junior World Cup
Bronze medal – third place	2018 Sydney	Individual

Ganemat Sekhon (born 29 November 2000) is an Indian skeet shooter. At the 2021 World Cup in New Delhi, Sekhon became the first Indian to win a medal in the women's skeet event of an World Cup.

== Career ==
Sekhon began shooting in 2015 on the instruction of her father Amrinder Singh when she was 15. She made her international debut at the ISSF Junior World Cup in 2016 at Suhl in which she placed 33.

In 2018, she become the first Indian female skeet shooter to win a medal at the ISSF Junior World Cup at Sydney, Australia when she won the bronze. She won the Asian Championships silver medal in 2019. Sekhon won bronze in the 2021 ISSF Shooting World Cup Women's Skeet event at New Delhi, the first for India in a women's event. She also won a gold in Skeet Mixed Team and a silver in Skeet Women Team at the same venue.

At the 2021 ISSF Junior World Championships, Sekhon won gold and silver in the Women's Skeet team and individual event, respectively.

Sekhon won gold in the Skeet Mixed Team event along with Mairaj Ahmad Khan at the 2023 ISSF World Cup in Cairo. This was followed by a silver medal in the Skeet Women event in Almaty.
