= Shooting at the 2004 Summer Olympics – Qualification =

== Qualification rules ==
A nation may earn up to 2 quota places per event, except for women's trap and skeet, which is entitled only to a maximum of one per NOC.

The qualification consists of two parts:

- A minimum qualification score (MQS) that each shooter has to perform in at least one ISSF championship to be eligible for the Olympics in that certain event. The MQS are set rather low.
- A number of quota places in each event, adding up to a total of 390. The quota places are won by the national federations when their shooters rank high in ISSF championships (at ISSF World Cups, only the best-ranking shooter yet without a Quota place gains one, while at the World Championships there are more places at stake). Some quota places are left as wild cards.

Each quota place gives the national federation the right to send one shooter to compete in that event. However, there is a maximum of two shooters per event and country. On the other hand, a shooter filling a quota place in one event may compete in other events as well, as long as the MQS have been fulfilled. Most shooters combine events in this way (apart from those in 25 metre rapid fire pistol and skeet, who generally do not, because there are no events similar to theirs on the program).

== Summary ==
Nation	Men										Women							Total	
Nation	FR 3x40	FR 60PR	AR 60	FP	RFP	AP 60	10 RT	TR 125	DT 150	SK 125	STR 3x20	AR 40	SP	AP 40	TR 75	DT 120	SK 75	Quotas	Athletes
Andorra								1										1	1
Argentina	2	2	2	1		1												8	3
Armenia				1		1												2	1
Australia	1	2	2	2	1	2	1	2	2	2	2	1	2	2	1	2	1	28	21
Austria	2	2	2								1	1						8	5
Azerbaijan													1	1			1	3	2
Bahrain						1												1	1
Bangladesh			1															1	1
Barbados										1								1	1
Belarus	2	2	1	2		2	2						2	2				15	9
Belgium												1						1	1
Bolivia						1												1	1
Bosnia and Herzegovina	1	1	1															3	1
Brazil								1										1	1
Bulgaria				1	1	1							1	1				5	3
Canada															2	2		4	2
Chile										1								1	1
China	2	2	2	2	2	2	2		2	1	2	2	2	2	1	2	1	29	26
Colombia								1		1			1	1				4	3
Costa Rica														1				1	1
Croatia													1	1				2	1
Cuba		1		2	1	1				2	1	1	1	1				11	8
Cyprus										2								2	2
Czech Republic	2	2		1		1	2			1	1	1	1	1				13	8
Denmark		1	1							1		1		1				5	5
Dominican Republic										1								1	1
Ecuador													1	1				2	1
Egypt			1							2		2						5	5
El Salvador												1						1	1
Estonia										1								1	1
Fiji								1										1	1
Finland	1	1	1					1	1	1	1	1					1	9	6
France				1		1		2		1	2	2	1	1	1			12	8
Georgia													1	1				2	1
Germany	2	2	2	2	2	2	2	2	1	1	2	2	2	2	1	1		28	20
Great Britain		1						2	1	1					1			6	6
Greece	1	1	2	1		1		1	1	1		2	1	1				13	11
Guatemala							1											1	1
Hong Kong														1				1	1
Hungary	1	1	1	1	1	1					2	2	2	2			1	15	8
India			2				2	1		2	2							9	8
Indonesia												1						1	1
Iran														1				1	1
Ireland								1										1	1
Israel		1		1		1												3	2
Italy	1	1	1	2		2		2	2	1	1	2			1		1	17	13
Jamaica												1						1	1
Japan	1	1	1	2		2				1	1	2	2	1	1			15	9
Kazakhstan				1		1	1				1	1	1	1				7	4
Kuwait								2	2	1								5	5
Kyrgyzstan	1	1	1															3	1
Latvia					1													1	1
Lebanon								1										1	1
Liechtenstein			1															1	1
Lithuania															1			1	1
Macedonia											1	1						2	1
Malaysia								1		1								2	2
Malta									1									1	1
Mexico	1		1															2	1
Moldova							1											1	1
Monaco												1						1	1
Mongolia													1	1				2	1
Namibia				1		1												2	1
Nepal			1															1	1
Netherlands	1	1	1							2								5	3
New Zealand		1														1		2	2
Nicaragua												1						1	1
Norway	2	2	2							2								8	5
Oman									1									1	1
Pakistan										1								1	1
Peru								1										1	1
Philippines								1										1	1
Poland				1		1				1	2	2						7	5
Portugal				1		1		1										3	2
Puerto Rico							1	1										2	1
Qatar								1	1									2	2
Romania				1	1	2												4	2
Russia	2	2	2	2	2	2	2	2	2	2	2	2	2	2	1	1	1	31	24
San Marino								1							1			2	2
Saudi Arabia										1								1	1
Serbia and Montenegro	1	1	1	1		1							1	1				7	3
Singapore								1										1	1
Slovakia	1	1	2														1	5	3
Slovenia	1	1	1															3	1
South Africa		1																1	1
South Korea	1	1	2	2	1	2				1	2	2	2	2	1	1	1	21	16
Spain				2		2							1	1	1	1		6	4
Sri Lanka											1	1						2	1
Sweden	2	2	2				2		1							1		10	8
Switzerland	1	1	1		1						1	1	2	2				10	5
Syria										1								1	1
Chinese Taipei				1		1									1			3	2
Tajikistan						1												1	1
Thailand	1	1	1	1		1												5	2
Trinidad and Tobago				1		1												2	1
Turkey								1										1	1
Turkmenistan	1	1																2	1
Ukraine	2	2	2	1	1	1	1			1	2	2	2	2	1			21	11
United Arab Emirates								1	1	1								3	2
United States	2	2	2	2		2	2	2	2	2	2	2	2	2	1	1	2	30	21
Uzbekistan	1	1	1								1	1						5	2
Venezuela													1	1				2	1
Vietnam						1												1	1
Virgin Islands				1		1												2	1
Zimbabwe									1									1	1
Total: 105 NOCs	40	46	47	42	17	47	19	35	25	41	33	44	37	41	17	15	12	558	390

== Timeline ==
Event	Date	Venue
2001 World Shotgun Championships	April 30 – May 8, 2001	(Egypt) Cairo
2002 ISSF World Cup #1	April 10–19, 2002	(Australia) Sydney
2002 ISSF World Cup #2	April 20–29, 2002	(China) Shanghai
2002 ISSF World Cup #3 Rifle & Pistol, & Running Target	May 18–26, 2002	(United States) Atlanta
2002 ISSF World Cup #4 Running Target	May 27–30, 2002	(Czech Republic) Plzeň
2002 ISSF World Cup #4 Rifle & Pistol	May 29 – June 3, 2002	(Italy) Milan
2002 ISSF World Cup #3 Shotgun	June 22–30, 2002	(Germany) Suhl
2002 ISSF World Shooting Championships	July 2–16, 2002	(Finland) Lahti
2002 ISSF World Cup #4 Shotgun	August 16–25, 2002	(Dominican Republic) Santo Domingo
2003 ISSF World Cup #1 Shotgun	March 3–15, 2003	(Australia) Perth
2003 ISSF World Cup #2 Shotgun	March 15–22, 2003	(India) New Delhi
2003 ISSF World Cup #1 Rifle & Pistol	May 3–11, 2003	(United States) Fort Benning
2003 ISSF World Cup #2 Rifle, Pistol, & Running Target	June 2–8, 2003	(Croatia) Zagreb
2003 ISSF World Cup #3 Rifle & Pistol, & Running Target	June 9–16, 2003	(Germany) Munich
2003 ISSF World Cup #3 Shotgun	June 22–28, 2003	(Spain) Granada
2003 ISSF World Cup #4 Rifle & Pistol, & Running Target	June 29 – July 7, 2003	(South Korea) Changwon
2003 ISSF World Cup #5 Running Target	July 24–26, 2003	(Germany) Suhl
2003 European Championships (Small-bore)	July 17 – August 6, 2003	(Czech Republic) Plzeň
2003 European Championships (Shotgun)	July 30 – August 6, 2003	(Czech Republic) Brno
2003 Pan American Games	August 2–9, 2003	(Dominican Republic) Santo Domingo
2003 ISSF World Cup #4 Shotgun	September 2–8, 2003	(Italy) Lonato
2003 World Shotgun Championships	September 10–17, 2003	(Cyprus) Nicosia
2003 African Continental Championships	September 21–27, 2003	(South Africa) Pretoria
2003 European Championships 10m events	November 4–12, 2003	(Sweden) Gothenburg
2003 Oceania Continental Championships	November 15–22, 2003	(New Zealand) Auckland
2004 Asian Continental Championships	February 6–19, 2004	(Malaysia) Kuala Lumpur

== 50 m rifle three positions men ==
Event	Quota places	Qualified athlete	Announced competitor
Host nation	Greece		Evangelos Liogris
2002 ISSF World Cup #1	Russia	Konstantin Prikhodtchenko	Sergei Kovalenko
2002 ISSF World Cup #2	Finland	Juha Hirvi	Juha Hirvi
2002 ISSF World Cup #3	United States	Matthew Emmons	Matthew Emmons
2002 ISSF World Cup #4	Slovenia	Rajmond Debevec	Rajmond Debevec
2002 World Championships	Switzerland	Marcel Bürge	Marcel Bürge
2002 World Championships	Hungary	Péter Sidi	Péter Sidi
2002 World Championships	United States	Michael Anti	Michael Anti
2002 World Championships	Norway	Harald Stenvaag	Harald Stenvaag
2002 World Championships	Slovakia	Jozef Gönci	Jozef Gönci
2003 ISSF World Cup #1	Sweden	Sven Haglund	Sven Haglund
2003 ISSF World Cup #2	Ukraine	Artur Ayvazyan	Artur Ayvazyan
2003 ISSF World Cup #3	Austria	Thomas Farnik	Thomas Farnik
2003 ISSF World Cup #4	China	Liu Zhiwei	Liu Zhiwei
2003 European Championships (Small-bore)	Russia	Viatcheslav Botchkarev	Artem Khadjibekov
2003 European Championships (Small-bore)	Serbia and Montenegro	Stevan Pletikosić	Stevan Pletikosić
2003 European Championships (Small-bore)	Ukraine	Yuriy Sukhorukov	Yuriy Sukhorukov
2003 Pan American Games	Argentina	Pablo Álvarez	Pablo Álvarez
2003 Oceania Championships	Australia	Timothy Lowndes	Timothy Lowndes
2004 Asian Championships	China	Yao Ye	Jia Zhanbo
2004 Asian Championships	South Korea	Bae Sung-duk	Park Bong-duk
Exchange of quota places	Germany		Christian Lusch
Re-allocation of unused quota	Mexico		Roberto José Elias
Re-allocation of unused quota	Turkmenistan		Igor Pirekeev
Athletes qualified in other events	Argentina		Ángel Velarte
Athletes qualified in other events	Austria		Christian Planer
Athletes qualified in other events	Belarus		Vitali Bubnovich
Athletes qualified in other events	Belarus		Sergei Martynov
Athletes qualified in other events	Bosnia and Herzegovina		Nedžad Fazlija
Athletes qualified in other events	Czech Republic		Václav Bečvář
Athletes qualified in other events	Czech Republic		Tomáš Jeřábek
Athletes qualified in other events	Germany		Maik Eckhardt
Athletes qualified in other events	Italy		Marco de Nicolo
Athletes qualified in other events	Japan		Masaru Yanagida
Athletes qualified in other events	Kyrgyzstan		Aleksandr Babchenko
Athletes qualified in other events	Netherlands		Dick Boschman
Athletes qualified in other events	Norway		Espen Berg-Knutsen
Athletes qualified in other events	Sweden		Roger Hansson
Athletes qualified in other events	Thailand		Tevarit Majchacheeap
Athletes qualified in other events	Uzbekistan		Vyacheslav Skoromnov
Total			40

== 50 m rifle prone men ==
Event	Quota places	Qualified athlete	Announced competitor
2002 ISSF World Cup #1	Austria	Mario Knögler	Mario Knögler
2002 ISSF World Cup #2	Belarus	Anatoli Klimenko	Yury Shcherbatsevich
2002 ISSF World Cup #3	Sweden	Jonas Edman	Jonas Edman
2002 ISSF World Cup #4	Great Britain	Michael Babb	Michael Babb
2002 World Championships	Norway	Espen Berg-Knutsen	Espen Berg-Knutsen
2002 World Championships	Italy	Marco de Nicolo	Marco de Nicolo
2002 World Championships	Belarus	Sergei Martynov	Sergei Martynov
2002 World Championships	Russia	Artem Khadjibekov	Artem Khadjibekov
2002 World Championships	Norway	Vebjørn Berg	Harald Stenvaag
2003 ISSF World Cup #1	United States	Eric Uptagrafft	Michael Anti
2003 ISSF World Cup #2	Czech Republic	Tomáš Jeřábek	Tomáš Jeřábek
2003 ISSF World Cup #3	Israel	Guy Starik	Guy Starik
2003 ISSF World Cup #4	Czech Republic	Václav Bečvář	Václav Bečvář
2003 European Championships (Small-bore)	Denmark	Torben Grimmel	Torben Grimmel
2003 European Championships (Small-bore)	Austria	Christian Planer	Wolfram Waibel
2003 European Championships (Small-bore)	Sweden	Roger Hansson	Roger Hansson
2003 Pan American Games	United States	Thomas Tamas	Matthew Emmons
2003 Pan American Games	Cuba	Reinier Estpinan	Reinier Estpinan
2003 African Championships	South Africa	Martin Senore	Martin Senore
2003 Oceania Championships	Australia	Morgan Henry	Warren Potent
2004 Asian Championships	Uzbekistan	Vyacheslav Skoromnov	Vyacheslav Skoromnov
2004 Asian Championships	China	Jia Zhanbo	Yao Ye
Exchange of quota places	New Zealand		Ryan Taylor
Athletes qualified in other events	Argentina		Pablo Álvarez
Athletes qualified in other events	Argentina		Ángel Velarte
Athletes qualified in other events	Australia		Timothy Lowndes
Athletes qualified in other events	Bosnia and Herzegovina		Nedžad Fazlija
Athletes qualified in other events	China		Jia Zhanbo
Athletes qualified in other events	Finland		Juha Hirvi
Athletes qualified in other events	Germany		Maik Eckhardt
Athletes qualified in other events	Germany		Christian Lusch
Athletes qualified in other events	Greece		Evangelos Liogris
Athletes qualified in other events	Hungary		Péter Sidi
Athletes qualified in other events	Japan		Masaru Yanagida
Athletes qualified in other events	Kyrgyzstan		Aleksandr Babchenko
Athletes qualified in other events	Netherlands		Dick Boschman
Athletes qualified in other events	Russia		Sergei Kovalenko
Athletes qualified in other events	Serbia and Montenegro		Stevan Pletikosić
Athletes qualified in other events	Slovakia		Jozef Gönci
Athletes qualified in other events	Slovenia		Rajmond Debevec
Athletes qualified in other events	South Korea		Park Bong-duk
Athletes qualified in other events	Switzerland		Marcel Bürge
Athletes qualified in other events	Thailand		Tevarit Majchacheeap
Athletes qualified in other events	Turkmenistan		Igor Pirekeev
Athletes qualified in other events	Ukraine		Artur Ayvazyan
Athletes qualified in other events	Ukraine		Yuriy Sukhorukov
Total			46

== 10 m air rifle men ==
Event	Quota places	Qualified athlete	Announced competitor
2002 ISSF World Cup #1	South Korea	Kim Byung-eun	Cheon Min-ho
2002 ISSF World Cup #2	China	Zhang Fu	Zhu Qinan
2002 ISSF World Cup #3	United States	Jason Parker	Jason Parker
2002 ISSF World Cup #4	Denmark	Peter Thuesen	Peter Thuesen
2002 World Championships	China	Li Jie	Li Jie
2002 World Championships	Russia	Yevgeni Aleinikov	Artem Khadjibekov
2002 World Championships	Netherlands	Dick Boschman	Dick Boschman
2002 World Championships	Thailand	Tevarit Majchacheeap	Tevarit Majchacheeap
2002 World Championships	Austria	Wolfram Waibel	Christian Planer
2002 World Championships	Sweden	Marcus Åkerholm	Marcus Åkerholm
2003 ISSF World Cup #1	Germany	Frank Köstel	Maik Eckhardt
2003 ISSF World Cup #2	Germany	Torsten Krebs	Torsten Krebs
2003 ISSF World Cup #3	India	Abhinav Bindra	Abhinav Bindra
2003 ISSF World Cup #4	South Korea	Yoon Tae-sook	Je Sung-tae
2003 Pan American Games	Argentina	Ángel Velarte	Ángel Velarte
2003 Pan American Games	United States	Bradley Wheeldon	Matthew Emmons
2003 European Championships 10m events	Russia	Sergei Kovalenko	Konstantin Prikhodtchenko
2003 European Championships 10m events	Slovakia	Matej Mészáros	Matej Mészáros
2003 European Championships 10m events	Belarus	Vitali Bubnovich	Vitali Bubnovich
2003 European Championships 10m events	Bosnia and Herzegovina	Nedžad Fazlija	Nedžad Fazlija
2003 African Championships	Egypt	Mohamed Abdellah	Mohamed Abdellah
2003 Oceania Championships	Australia	Matthew Inabinet	Matthew Inabinet
2004 Asian Championships	Japan	Masaru Yanagida	Masaru Yanagida
2004 Asian Championships	India	Gagan Narang	Gagan Narang
Exchange of quota places	Greece		Georgios Petsanis
Exchange of quota places	Greece		Konstantinos Savorgiannakis
Exchange of quota places	Norway		Leif Steinar Rolland
Tripartite Commission Invitation	Bangladesh		Asif Hossain Khan
Tripartite Commission Invitation	Nepal		Tika Shrestha
Re-allocation of unused quota	Kyrgyzstan		Aleksandr Babchenko
Re-allocation of unused quota	Liechtenstein		Oliver Geissmann
Athletes qualified in other events	Argentina		Pablo Álvarez
Athletes qualified in other events	Australia		Timothy Lowndes
Athletes qualified in other events	Austria		Thomas Farnik
Athletes qualified in other events	Finland		Juha Hirvi
Athletes qualified in other events	Hungary		Péter Sidi
Athletes qualified in other events	Italy		Marco de Nicolo
Athletes qualified in other events	Mexico		Roberto José Elias
Athletes qualified in other events	Norway		Espen Berg-Knutsen
Athletes qualified in other events	Serbia and Montenegro		Stevan Pletikosić
Athletes qualified in other events	Slovakia		Jozef Gönci
Athletes qualified in other events	Slovenia		Rajmond Debevec
Athletes qualified in other events	Sweden		Sven Haglund
Athletes qualified in other events	Switzerland		Marcel Bürge
Athletes qualified in other events	Ukraine		Artur Ayvazyan
Athletes qualified in other events	Ukraine		Yuriy Sukhorukov
Athletes qualified in other events	Uzbekistan		Vyacheslav Skoromnov
Total			47

== 50 m pistol men ==
Event	Quota places	Qualified athlete	Announced competitor
2002 ISSF World Cup #1	France	Franck Dumoulin	Franck Dumoulin
2002 ISSF World Cup #2	China	Wang Yifu	Tan Zongliang
2002 ISSF World Cup #3	Czech Republic	Martin Tenk	Martin Tenk
2002 ISSF World Cup #4	China	Xu Dan	Xu Dan
2002 World Championships	Russia	Vladimir Gontcharov	Mikhail Nestruyev
2002 World Championships	Israel	Alexander Danilov	Alexander Danilov
2002 World Championships	Russia	Boris Kokorev	Boris Kokorev
2002 World Championships	Germany	Frank Seeger	Frank Seeger
2002 World Championships	Portugal	João Costa	João Costa
2003 ISSF World Cup #1	Ukraine	Viktor Makarov	Viktor Makarov
2003 ISSF World Cup #2	Spain	Isidro Lorenzo	Isidro Lorenzo
2003 ISSF World Cup #3	Italy	Francesco Bruno	Francesco Bruno
2003 ISSF World Cup #4	Greece	Dionissios Georgakopoulos	Dionissios Georgakopoulos
2003 European Championships (Small-bore)	Hungary	Attila Simon	Attila Simon
2003 European Championships (Small-bore)	Germany	Holger Buchmann	Abdulla Ustaoglu
2003 Pan American Games	Cuba	Arseny Borrero	Arseny Borrero
2003 Pan American Games	Cuba	Norbelis Bárzaga	Norbelis Bárzaga
2003 African Championships	Namibia	Friedhelm Sack	Friedhelm Sack
2003 Oceania Championships	Australia	David Moore	David Moore
2004 Asian Championships	North Korea	Kim Hyon-ung	Kim Hyon-ung
2004 Asian Championships	Kazakhstan	Vladimir Issachenko	Vladimir Issachenko
Exchange of quota places	South Korea		Lee Sang-do
Athletes qualified in other events	Argentina		Maximo Modesti
Athletes qualified in other events	Armenia		Norayr Bakhtamyan
Athletes qualified in other events	Australia		Daniel Repacholi
Athletes qualified in other events	Belarus		Igor Basinski
Athletes qualified in other events	Belarus		Kanstantsin Lukashyk
Athletes qualified in other events	Bulgaria		Tanyu Kiryakov
Athletes qualified in other events	Italy		Vigilio Fait
Athletes qualified in other events	Japan		Masaru Nakashige
Athletes qualified in other events	North Korea		Kim Jong-su
Athletes qualified in other events	Poland		Wojciech Knapik
Athletes qualified in other events	Romania		Sorin Babii
Athletes qualified in other events	Serbia and Montenegro		Andrija Zlatić
Athletes qualified in other events	South Korea		Jin Jong-oh
Athletes qualified in other events	Spain		José Antonio Colado
Athletes qualified in other events	Chinese Taipei		Chang Yi-ning
Athletes qualified in other events	Thailand		Jakkrit Panichpatikum
Athletes qualified in other events	Trinidad and Tobago		Roger Daniel
Athletes qualified in other events	United States		Daryl Szarenski
Athletes qualified in other events	United States		Jason Turner
Athletes qualified in other events	Virgin Islands		Chris Rice
Total			42

== 25 m rapid fire pistol men ==
Event	Quota places	Qualified athlete	Announced competitor
2002 ISSF World Cup #1	Bulgaria	Emil Milev	Emil Milev
2002 ISSF World Cup #2	Germany	Marco Spangenberg	Marco Spangenberg
2002 ISSF World Cup #3	China	Zhang Penghui	Zhang Penghui
2002 ISSF World Cup #4	China	Liu Guohui	Chen Yongqiang
2002 World Championships	Germany	Ralf Schumann	Ralf Schumann
2002 World Championships	Switzerland	Niki Marty	Niki Marty
2003 ISSF World Cup #1	Ukraine	Oleh Tkachov	Oleh Tkachov
2003 ISSF World Cup #2	Latvia	Afanasijs Kuzmins	Afanasijs Kuzmins
2003 ISSF World Cup #3	Russia	Sergei Alifirenko	Sergei Alifirenko
2003 ISSF World Cup #4	South Korea	Lee Sang-hak	Kang Hyung-chul
2003 European Championships (Small-bore)	Hungary	Lajos Pálinkás	Lajos Pálinkás
2003 European Championships (Small-bore)	Russia	Sergei Polyakov	Sergei Polyakov
2003 Pan American Games	Cuba	Leuris Pupo	Leuris Pupo
2003 Oceania Championships	Australia	Sinisa Gnjatović	Bruce Quick
2004 Asian Championships	Japan	Shuji Tazawa	Shuji Tazawa
Additional places	Romania		Iulian Raicea
Athletes qualified in other events	North Korea		Kim Hyon-ung
Total			17

== 10 m air pistol men ==
Event	Quota places	Qualified athlete	Announced competitor
2002 ISSF World Cup #1	Russia	Vladimir Isakov	Vladimir Isakov
2002 ISSF World Cup #2	Bulgaria	Tanyu Kiryakov	Tanyu Kiryakov
2002 ISSF World Cup #3	China	Tan Zongliang	Tan Zongliang
2002 ISSF World Cup #4	Italy	Vigilio Fait	Vigilio Fait
2002 World Championships	Russia	Mikhail Nestruyev	Mikhail Nestruyev
2002 World Championships	Serbia and Montenegro	Andrija Zlatić	Andrija Zlatić
2002 World Championships	Armenia	Norayr Bakhtamyan	Norayr Bakhtamyan
2002 World Championships	United States	Daryl Szarenski	Daryl Szarenski
2002 World Championships	Chinese Taipei	Chang Yi-ning	Chang Yi-ning
2002 World Championships	South Korea	Jin Jong-oh	Jin Jong-oh
2003 ISSF World Cup #1	Germany	Artur Gevorgjan	Artur Gevorgjan
2003 ISSF World Cup #2	Belarus	Yury Dauhapolau	Kanstantsin Lukashyk
2003 ISSF World Cup #3	Japan	Masaru Nakashige	Masaru Nakashige
2003 ISSF World Cup #4	Poland	Wojciech Knapik	Wojciech Knapik
2003 Pan American Games	United States	Jason Turner	Jason Turner
2003 Pan American Games	Argentina	Maximo Modesti	Maximo Modesti
2003 European Championships 10m events	Belarus	Igor Basinski	Igor Basinski
2003 European Championships 10m events	Romania	Sorin Babii	Sorin Babii
2003 European Championships 10m events	Germany	Abdulla Ustaoglu	Abdulla Ustaoglu
2003 European Championships 10m events	Spain	José Antonio Colado	José Antonio Colado
2003 Oceania Championships	Australia	Daniel Repacholi	Daniel Repacholi
2004 Asian Championships	North Korea	Kim Jong-su	Kim Jong-su
2004 Asian Championships	China	Wang Jubao	Wang Yifu
Tripartite Commission Invitation	Bahrain		Khalid Mohamed
Tripartite Commission Invitation	Bolivia		Rudolf Knijnenburg
Re-allocation of unused quota	Tajikistan		Sergey Babikov
Re-allocation of unused quota	Trinidad and Tobago		Roger Daniel
Re-allocation of unused quota	Vietnam		Nguyễn Mạnh Tường
Re-allocation of unused quota	Virgin Islands		Chris Rice
Additional places	Thailand		Jakkrit Panichpatikum
Athletes qualified in other events	Australia		David Moore
Athletes qualified in other events	Cuba		Norbelis Bárzaga
Athletes qualified in other events	Czech Republic		Martin Tenk
Athletes qualified in other events	France		Franck Dumoulin
Athletes qualified in other events	Greece		Dionissios Georgakopoulos
Athletes qualified in other events	Hungary		Attila Simon
Athletes qualified in other events	Israel		Alexander Danilov
Athletes qualified in other events	Italy		Francesco Bruno
Athletes qualified in other events	Japan		Shuji Tazawa
Athletes qualified in other events	Kazakhstan		Vladimir Issachenko
Athletes qualified in other events	South Korea		Lee Sang-do
Athletes qualified in other events	Namibia		Friedhelm Sack
Athletes qualified in other events	North Korea		Kim Hyon-ung
Athletes qualified in other events	Portugal		João Costa
Athletes qualified in other events	Romania		Iulian Raicea
Athletes qualified in other events	Spain		Isidro Lorenzo
Athletes qualified in other events	Ukraine		Viktor Makarov
Total			47

== 10 m running target men ==
Event	Quota places	Qualified athlete	Announced competitor
2002 ISSF World Cup #1	Czech Republic	Miroslav Januš	Miroslav Januš
2002 ISSF World Cup #2	Germany	Manfred Kurzer	Manfred Kurzer
2002 ISSF World Cup #3	Russia	Dimitri Lykin	Dimitri Lykin
2002 ISSF World Cup #4	Russia	Igor Kolessov	Aleksandr Blinov
2002 World Championships	China	Yang Ling	Geng Hongbin
2002 World Championships	United States	Adam Saathoff	Adam Saathoff
2003 ISSF World Cup #2	China	Li Jie	Li Jie
2003 ISSF World Cup #3	Czech Republic	Tomáš Caknakis	Tomáš Caknakis
2003 ISSF World Cup #4	Germany	Michael Jakosits	Michael Jakosits
2003 ISSF World Cup #5	Sweden	Niklas Bergström	Niklas Bergström
2003 Pan American Games	United States	William Johnson	Koby Holland
2003 European Championships 10m events	Belarus	Andrei Vasilyeu	Andrei Vasilyeu
2003 European Championships 10m events	Belarus	Andrei Kazak	Andrei Kazak
2003 Oceania Championships	Australia	Adam Gitsham	Bryan Wilson
2004 Asian Championships	Kazakhstan	Andrey Gurov	Andrey Gurov
Exchange of quota places	Sweden		Emil Martinsson
Exchange of quota places	Ukraine		Vladyslav Prianishnikov
Re-allocation of unused quota	Guatemala		Attila Solti
Re-allocation of unused quota	Moldova		Oleg Moldovan
Total			19

== Trap men ==
Event	Quota places	Qualified athlete	Announced competitor
Host nation	Greece		Nikolaos Antoniadis
2001 World Shotgun Championships	Australia	Michael Diamond	Michael Diamond
2002 ISSF World Cup #1	United States	Lance Bade	Lance Bade
2002 ISSF World Cup #2	Italy	Giovanni Pellielo	Giovanni Pellielo
2002 ISSF World Cup #3	Russia	Alexey Alipov	Alexey Alipov
2002 World Championships	Kuwait	Khaled Al-Mudhaf	Khaled Al-Mudhaf
2002 World Championships	Finland	Tommi Andelin	Petri Nummela
2002 World Championships	Ireland	Derek Burnett	Derek Burnett
2002 ISSF World Cup #4	United States	Dominic Grazioli	Bret Erickson
2003 ISSF World Cup #1	Australia	Adam Vella	Adam Vella
2003 ISSF World Cup #2	Great Britain	Ian Peel	Ian Peel
2003 ISSF World Cup #3	Portugal	Custódio Ezequiel	Custódio Ezequiel
2003 European Championships (Shotgun)	France	Yves Tronc	Yves Tronc
2003 European Championships (Shotgun)	Germany	Olaf Kirchstein	Olaf Kirchstein
2003 European Championships (Shotgun)	Italy	Marco Venturini	Marco Venturini
2003 European Championships (Shotgun)	Turkey	Oğuzhan Tüzün	Oğuzhan Tüzün
2003 European Championships (Shotgun)	France	Stéphane Clamens	Stéphane Clamens
2003 Pan American Games	Brazil	Rodrigo Bastos	Rodrigo Bastos
2003 Pan American Games	Colombia	Danilo Caro	Danilo Caro
2003 ISSF World Cup #4	Great Britain	Edward Ling	Edward Ling
2003 World Shotgun Championships	Germany	Karsten Bindrich	Karsten Bindrich
2004 Asian Championships	India	Mansher Singh	Mansher Singh
2004 Asian Championships	Kuwait	Naser Meqlad	Naser Meqlad
2004 Asian Championships	India	Manavjit Singh Sandhu	Manavjit Singh Sandhu
Exchange of quota places	Russia		Maxim Kosarev
Tripartite Commission Invitation	Andorra		Francesc Repiso Romero
Tripartite Commission Invitation	Philippines		Jethro Dionisio
Tripartite Commission Invitation	Singapore		Lee Wung Yew
Re-allocation of unused quota	Fiji		Glenn Kable
Re-allocation of unused quota	Lebanon		Nidal Asmar
Additional places	San Marino		Francesco Amici
Additional places	Malaysia		Bernard Yeoh Cheng Han
Athletes qualified in other events	Peru		Francisco Boza
Athletes qualified in other events	Puerto Rico		Lucas Rafael Bennazar Ortiz
Athletes qualified in other events	United Arab Emirates		Ahmed Al-Maktoum
Total			35

== Double trap men ==
Event	Quota places	Qualified athlete	Announced competitor
2001 World Shotgun Championships	Kuwait	Hamed Al-Afasi	Fehaid Al-Deehani
2002 ISSF World Cup #1	Italy	Daniele di Spigno	Daniele di Spigno
2002 ISSF World Cup #2	Germany	Waldemar Schanz	Waldemar Schanz
2002 ISSF World Cup #3	United States	Walton Eller	Walton Eller
2002 World Championships	Finland	Joonas Olkkonen	Joonas Olkkonen
2002 World Championships	Great Britain	Richard Faulds	Richard Faulds
2002 ISSF World Cup #4	Italy	Marco Innocenti	Marco Innocenti
2003 ISSF World Cup #1	Australia	Russell Mark	Thomas Turner
2003 ISSF World Cup #2	United Arab Emirates	Ahmed Al-Maktoum	Ahmed Al-Maktoum
2003 ISSF World Cup #3	China	Hu Binyuan	Hu Binyuan
2003 European Championships (Shotgun)	Sweden	Håkan Dahlby	Håkan Dahlby
2003 Pan American Games	United States	Jeffrey Holguin	Bret Erickson
2003 Pan American Games	Puerto Rico	Lucas Rafael Bennazar Ortiz	Lucas Rafael Bennazar Ortiz
2003 ISSF World Cup #4	Qatar	Rashid Hamad Al-Athba	Rashid Hamad Al-Athba
2003 World Shotgun Championships	India	Rajyavardhan Singh Rathore	Rajyavardhan Singh Rathore
2003 Oceania Championships	Australia	Steve Haberman	Steve Haberman
2004 Asian Championships	Kuwait	Mashfi Al-Mutairi	Mashfi Al-Mutairi
Exchange of quota places	China		Wang Zheng
Exchange of quota places	Greece		Angelos Spiropoulos
Exchange of quota places	Russia		Vitaly Fokeev
Exchange of quota places	Russia		Vasily Mosin
Tripartite Commission Invitation	Oman		Saleem Al-Nasri
Re-allocation of unused quota	Malta		William Chetcuti
Re-allocation of unused quota	Peru		Francisco Boza
Re-allocation of unused quota	Zimbabwe		Sean Nicholson
Total			25

== Skeet men ==
Event	Quota places	Qualified athlete	Announced competitor
Host nation	Greece		Georgios Salavantakis
2001 World Shotgun Championships	United States	Shawn Dulohery	Shawn Dulohery
2001 World Shotgun Championships	Italy	Ennio Falco	Ennio Falco
2002 ISSF World Cup #1	Norway	Erik Watndal	Erik Watndal
2002 ISSF World Cup #2	Netherlands	Hennie Dompeling	Hennie Dompeling
2002 ISSF World Cup #3	Italy	Andrea Benelli	Andrea Benelli
2002 World Championships	Norway	Harald Jensen	Harald Jensen
2002 World Championships	Russia	Valeriy Shomin	Valeriy Shomin
2002 World Championships	Czech Republic	Jan Sychra	Jan Sychra
2002 ISSF World Cup #4	United States	James Graves	James Graves
2003 ISSF World Cup #1	Russia	Oleg Tishin	Sergey Aksyutin
2003 ISSF World Cup #2	Cyprus	Georgios Achilleos	Georgios Achilleos
2003 ISSF World Cup #3	Finland	Heikki Meriluoto	Marko Kemppainen
2003 European Championships (Shotgun)	Denmark	Michael Nielsen	Michael Nielsen
2003 European Championships (Shotgun)	Germany	Axel Wegner	Axel Wegner
2003 European Championships (Shotgun)	Great Britain	Richard Brickell	Richard Brickell
2003 European Championships (Shotgun)	Netherlands	Jan-Cor van der Greef	Jan-Cor van der Greef
2003 European Championships (Shotgun)	France	Franck Durbesson	Anthony Terras
2003 Pan American Games	Cuba	Guillermo Alfredo Torres	Guillermo Alfredo Torres
2003 Pan American Games	Colombia	Diego Duarte	Diego Duarte
2003 ISSF World Cup #4	Ukraine	Mykola Milchev	Mykola Milchev
2003 World Shotgun Championships	Poland	Andrzej Głyda	Andrzej Głyda
2003 World Shotgun Championships	China	Jin Di	Jin Di
2003 African Championships	Egypt	Amr El-Gaiar	Amr El-Gaiar
2003 Oceania Championships	Australia	Paul Rahman	Paul Rahman
2003 Oceania Championships	Australia	David Cunningham	George Barton
2004 Asian Championships	Saudi Arabia	Saied Al-Mutairi	Saied Al-Mutairi
2004 Asian Championships	Kuwait	Zaid Al-Mutairi	Zaid Al-Mutairi
2004 Asian Championships	South Korea	Lee Suk-tae	Lee Suk-tae
Exchange of quota places	Cuba		Juan Miguel Rodríguez
Exchange of quota places	Egypt		Mostafa Hamdy
Exchange of quota places	Cyprus		Antonis Nikolaidis
Tripartite Commission Invitation	Barbados		Michael Maskell
Tripartite Commission Invitation	Estonia		Andrei Inešin
Tripartite Commission Invitation	Malaysia		Ricky Teh Chee Fei
Re-allocation of unused quota	Chile		Jorge Atalah
Re-allocation of unused quota	Pakistan		Khurram Inam
Re-allocation of unused quota	Dominican Republic		Julio Elizardo Dujarric
Re-allocation of unused quota	Syria		Roger Dahi
Additional places	United Arab Emirates		Saeed Al-Maktoum
Additional places	Qatar		Nasser Al-Attiyah
Total			41

== 50 m rifle three positions women ==
Event	Quota places	Qualified athlete	Announced competitor
2002 ISSF World Cup #1	Russia	Lioubov Galkina	Lioubov Galkina
2002 ISSF World Cup #2	China	Shan Hong	Wang Chengyi
2002 ISSF World Cup #3	China	Wang Xian	Wu Liuxi
2002 ISSF World Cup #4	Germany	Karin Schade	Barbara Lechner
2002 World Championships	Germany	Petra Horneber	Sonja Pfeilschifter
2002 World Championships	Ukraine	Natallia Kalnysh	Natallia Kalnysh
2002 World Championships	Kazakhstan	Olga Dovgun	Olga Dovgun
2002 World Championships	France	Laurence Brize	Laurence Brize
2002 World Championships	South Korea	Kim Jung-mi	Kim Jung-mi
2003 ISSF World Cup #1	Hungary	Éva Joó	Éva Joó
2003 ISSF World Cup #2	United States	Jamie Beyerle	Morgan Hicks
2003 ISSF World Cup #3	Ukraine	Olena Davydova	Lessia Leskiv
2003 ISSF World Cup #4	Hungary	Beáta Krzyzewsky	Beáta Krzyzewsky
2003 European Championships (Small-bore)	Russia	Tatyana Yushkova	Tatiana Goldobina
2003 European Championships (Small-bore)	Switzerland	Oriana Scheuss	Gaby Bühlmann
2003 European Championships (Small-bore)	Poland	Sylwia Bogacka	Sylwia Bogacka
2003 Pan American Games	United States	Sarah Blakeslee	Sarah Blakeslee
2003 Oceania Championships	Australia	Robyn van Nus	Kim Frazer
2004 Asian Championships	South Korea	Lee Sun-hee	Lee Hye-jin
2004 Asian Championships	India	Deepali Deshpande	Deepali Deshpande
Exchange of quota places	Italy		Valentina Turisini
Tripartite Commission Invitation	Nicaragua		Svitlana Kashchenko
Athletes qualified in other events	Australia		Susan McCready
Athletes qualified in other events	Cuba		Eglis Yaima Cruz
Athletes qualified in other events	Czech Republic		Kateřina Kůrková
Athletes qualified in other events	Finland		Marjo Yli-Kiikka
Athletes qualified in other events	France		Valérie Bellenoue
Athletes qualified in other events	India		Anjali Bhagwat
Athletes qualified in other events	Japan		Hiromi Misaki
Athletes qualified in other events	Macedonia		Divna Pešić
Athletes qualified in other events	Poland		Renata Mauer-Różańska
Athletes qualified in other events	Sri Lanka		Pushpamali Ramanayake
Athletes qualified in other events	Uzbekistan		Alyona Aksyonova
Total			33

== 10 m air rifle women ==
Event	Quota places	Qualified athlete	Announced competitor
Host nation	Greece		Maria Faka
2002 ISSF World Cup #1	South Korea	Seo Sun-hwa	Seo Sun-hwa
2002 ISSF World Cup #2	China	Gao Jing	Zhao Yinghui
2002 ISSF World Cup #3	India	Anjali Bhagwat	Anjali Bhagwat
2002 ISSF World Cup #4	Germany	Sonja Pfeilschifter	Sonja Pfeilschifter
2002 World Championships	Czech Republic	Kateřina Kůrková	Kateřina Kůrková
2002 World Championships	China	Du Li	Du Li
2002 World Championships	United States	Emily Caruso	Emily Caruso
2002 World Championships	Poland	Renata Mauer-Różańska	Renata Mauer-Różańska
2002 World Championships	France	Valérie Bellenoue	Valérie Bellenoue
2002 World Championships	Denmark	Ann Spejlsgaard	Ann Spejlsgaard
2003 ISSF World Cup #1	Russia	Tatiana Goldobina	Tatiana Goldobina
2003 ISSF World Cup #2	South Korea	Kang Cho-hyun	Cho Eun-young
2003 ISSF World Cup #3	Poland	Agata Hatalska	Agnieszka Staroń
2003 ISSF World Cup #4	Japan	Hiromi Misaki	Hiromi Misaki
2003 Pan American Games	Cuba	Eglis Yaima Cruz	Eglis Yaima Cruz
2003 Pan American Games	United States	Melissa Mulloy	Hattie Johnson
2003 European Championships 10m events	Finland	Hanna Etula	Marjo Yli-Kiikka
2003 European Championships 10m events	Germany	Dorothee Bauer	Dorothee Bauer
2003 European Championships 10m events	Ukraine	Nataliya Omelyanenko	Lessia Leskiv
2003 European Championships 10m events	Belgium	Daisy de Bock	Daisy de Bock
2003 African Championships	Egypt	Shaimaa Abdel-Latif	Shaimaa Abdel-Latif
2003 Oceania Championships	Australia	Susannah Smith	Susan McCready
2004 Asian Championships	India	Suma Shirur	Suma Shirur
2004 Asian Championships	Uzbekistan	Alyona Aksyonova	Alyona Aksyonova
Exchange of quota places	Egypt		Dina Hosny
Exchange of quota places	Greece		Alexia Smirli
Exchange of quota places	Italy		Sabrina Sena
Tripartite Commission Invitation	Monaco		Fabienne Pasetti
Re-allocation of unused quota	El Salvador		Patricia Rivas
Re-allocation of unused quota	Indonesia		Yosheefin Prasasti
Re-allocation of unused quota	Jamaica		Dawn Kobayashi
Re-allocation of unused quota	Macedonia		Divna Pešić
Re-allocation of unused quota	Sri Lanka		Pushpamali Ramanayake
Additional places	Austria		Monika Haselsberger
Athletes qualified in other events	France		Laurence Brize
Athletes qualified in other events	Hungary		Éva Joó
Athletes qualified in other events	Hungary		Beáta Krzyzewsky
Athletes qualified in other events	Italy		Valentina Turisini
Athletes qualified in other events	Kazakhstan		Olga Dovgun
Athletes qualified in other events	Nicaragua		Svitlana Kashchenko
Athletes qualified in other events	Russia		Lioubov Galkina
Athletes qualified in other events	Switzerland		Gaby Bühlmann
Athletes qualified in other events	Ukraine		Natallia Kalnysh
Total			44

== 25 m pistol women ==
Event	Quota places	Qualified athlete	Announced competitor
Host nation	Greece		Agathi Kassoumi
2002 ISSF World Cup #1	China	Ren Jie	Cao Ying
2002 ISSF World Cup #2	China	Chen Ying	Chen Ying
2002 ISSF World Cup #3	Bulgaria	Mariya Grozdeva	Mariya Grozdeva
2002 ISSF World Cup #4	Belarus	Yuliya Alipava	Yuliya Alipava
2002 World Championships	Azerbaijan	Irada Ashumova	Irada Ashumova
2002 World Championships	United States	Elizabeth Callahan	Elizabeth Callahan
2002 World Championships	Kazakhstan	Galina Belyayeva	Galina Belyayeva
2002 World Championships	Russia	Irina Dolgatcheva	Galina Belyayeva
2003 ISSF World Cup #1	Mongolia	Otryadyn Gündegmaa	Otryadyn Gündegmaa
2003 ISSF World Cup #2	Spain	María Pilar Fernández	María Pilar Fernández
2003 ISSF World Cup #3	South Korea	Kang Eun-ra	Seo Joo-hyung
2003 ISSF World Cup #4	South Korea	Ko Jin-sook	Ahn Soo-kyeong
2003 European Championships (Small-bore)	Hungary	Dorottya Erdős	Dorottya Erdős
2003 European Championships (Small-bore)	Serbia and Montenegro	Jasna Šekarić	Jasna Šekarić
2003 European Championships (Small-bore)	Czech Republic	Lenka Hyková	Lenka Hyková
2003 Pan American Games	United States	Sandra Uptagrafft	Rebecca Snyder
2003 Pan American Games	Cuba	Margarita Tarradell	Margarita Tarradell
2003 Oceania Championships	Australia	Annette Woodward	Annette Woodward
2004 Asian Championships	Japan	Yukari Konishi	Yukari Konishi
2004 Asian Championships	Japan	Michiko Fukushima	Michiko Fukushima
Exchange of quota places	Germany		Claudia Verdicchio
Athletes qualified in other events	Australia		Lalita Yauhleuskaya
Athletes qualified in other events	Belarus		Viktoria Chaika
Athletes qualified in other events	Colombia		Amanda Mondol
Athletes qualified in other events	Croatia		Mirela Skoko-Ćelić
Athletes qualified in other events	Ecuador		Carmen Malo
Athletes qualified in other events	France		Brigitte Roy
Athletes qualified in other events	Georgia		Nino Salukvadze
Athletes qualified in other events	Germany		Munkhbayar Dorjsuren
Athletes qualified in other events	Hungary		Zsófia Csonka
Athletes qualified in other events	Russia		Natalia Paderina
Athletes qualified in other events	Switzerland		Cornelia Frölich
Athletes qualified in other events	Switzerland		Monika Rieder
Athletes qualified in other events	Ukraine		Yuliya Korostylova
Athletes qualified in other events	Ukraine		Olena Kostevych
Athletes qualified in other events	Venezuela		Francis Gorrin
Total			37

== 10 m air pistol women ==
Event	Quota places	Qualified athlete	Announced competitor
2002 ISSF World Cup #1	Ukraine	Olena Kostevych	Olena Kostevych
2002 ISSF World Cup #2	Georgia	Nino Salukvadze	Nino Salukvadze
2002 ISSF World Cup #3	China	Tao Luna	Tao Luna
2002 ISSF World Cup #4	Germany	Munkhbayar Dorjsuren	Munkhbayar Dorjsuren
2002 World Championships	Russia	Olga Kuznetsova	Olga Kuznetsova
2002 World Championships	Australia	Lalita Yauhleuskaya	Lalita Yauhleuskaya
2002 World Championships	Croatia	Mirela Skoko-Ćelić	Mirela Skoko-Ćelić
2002 World Championships	Belarus	Viktoria Chaika	Viktoria Chaika
2002 World Championships	South Korea	Kim Mi-jung	Park Ah-young
2003 ISSF World Cup #1	South Korea	Ahn Soo-kyeong	Ahn Soo-kyeong
2003 ISSF World Cup #2	Russia	Natalia Paderina	Natalia Paderina
2003 ISSF World Cup #3	Denmark	Susanne Meyerhoff	Susanne Meyerhoff
2003 ISSF World Cup #4	Hungary	Zsófia Csonka	Zsófia Csonka
2003 Pan American Games	Venezuela	Francis Gorrin	Francis Gorrin
2003 Pan American Games	Colombia	Amanda Mondol	Amanda Mondol
2003 European Championships 10m events	Switzerland	Angela Schuler	Monika Rieder
2003 European Championships 10m events	France	Nadine Lempegnat	Brigitte Roy
2003 European Championships 10m events	Switzerland	Cornelia Frölich	Cornelia Frölich
2003 Oceania Championships	Australia	Annemarie Forder	Linda Ryan
2004 Asian Championships	China	Wang Lina	Ren Jie
2004 Asian Championships	Japan	Yoko Inada	Yoko Inada
Exchange of quota places	Greece		Marina Karaflou
Exchange of quota places	Ukraine		Yuliya Korostylova
Tripartite Commission Invitation	Costa Rica		Grettel Barboza
Tripartite Commission Invitation	Iran		Nasim Hassanpour
Re-allocation of unused quota	Ecuador		Carmen Malo
Re-allocation of unused quota	Hong Kong		Lo Ka Kay
Athletes qualified in other events	Azerbaijan		Irada Ashumova
Athletes qualified in other events	Belarus		Yuliya Alipava
Athletes qualified in other events	Bulgaria		Mariya Grozdeva
Athletes qualified in other events	Cuba		Margarita Tarradell
Athletes qualified in other events	Czech Republic		Lenka Hyková
Athletes qualified in other events	Germany		Claudia Verdicchio
Athletes qualified in other events	Hungary		Dorottya Erdős
Athletes qualified in other events	Japan		Michiko Fukushima
Athletes qualified in other events	Kazakhstan		Galina Belyayeva
Athletes qualified in other events	Mongolia		Otryadyn Gündegmaa
Athletes qualified in other events	Serbia and Montenegro		Jasna Šekarić
Athletes qualified in other events	Spain		María Pilar Fernández
Athletes qualified in other events	United States		Elizabeth Callahan
Athletes qualified in other events	United States		Rebecca Snyder
Total			41

== Trap women ==
Event	Quota places	Qualified athlete	Announced competitor
2001 World Shotgun Championships	Russia	Irina Laricheva	Irina Laricheva
2002 ISSF World Cup #2	Germany	Susanne Kiermayer	Susanne Kiermayer
2002 ISSF World Cup #3	Italy	Roberta Pelosi	Roberta Pelosi
2002 World Championships	Lithuania	Daina Gudzinevičiūtė	Daina Gudzinevičiūtė
2003 ISSF World Cup #1	Great Britain	Sarah Gibbins	Sarah Gibbins
2003 ISSF World Cup #3	France	Delphine Racinet	Stéphanie Neau
2003 European Championships (Shotgun)	Spain	María Quintanal	María Quintanal
2003 Pan American Games	United States	Whitly Loper	Whitly Loper
2003 World Shotgun Championships	Ukraine	Viktoria Chuyko	Viktoria Chuyko
2003 Oceania Championships	Australia	Suzanne Balogh	Suzanne Balogh
2004 Asian Championships	China	Wang Yujin	Gao E
Exchange of quota places	Canada		Susan Nattrass
Re-allocation of unused quota	San Marino		Emanuela Felici
Additional places	Japan		Taeko Takeba
Athletes qualified in other events	Canada		Cynthia Meyer
Athletes qualified in other events	South Korea		Lee Bo-na
Athletes qualified in other events	Sweden		Pia Hansen
Total			17

== Double trap women ==
Event	Quota places	Qualified athlete	Announced competitor
2002 ISSF World Cup #2	Sweden	Pia Hansen	Pia Hansen
2002 ISSF World Cup #3	China	Wang Jinglin	Li Qingnian
2002 World Championships	Chinese Taipei	Lin Yi-chun	Lin Yi-chun
2003 ISSF World Cup #1	United States	Kimberly Rhode	Kimberly Rhode
2003 ISSF World Cup #3	Australia	Susan Trindall	Susan Trindall
2003 European Championships (Shotgun)	Russia	Yelena Rabaia	Yelena Dudnik
2003 Pan American Games	Canada	Cynthia Meyer	Cynthia Meyer
2003 World Shotgun Championships	South Korea	Lee Bo-na	Lee Bo-na
2003 Oceania Championships	New Zealand	Nadine Stanton	Nadine Stanton
2004 Asian Championships	Japan	Megumi Inoue	Megumi Inoue
Athletes qualified in other events	Australia		Suzanne Balogh
Athletes qualified in other events	Canada		Susan Nattrass
Athletes qualified in other events	China		Gao E
Athletes qualified in other events	Germany		Susanne Kiermayer
Athletes qualified in other events	Spain		María Quintanal
Total			15

== Skeet women ==
Event	Quota places	Qualified athlete	Announced competitor
2001 World Shotgun Championships	Azerbaijan	Zemfira Meftahatdinova	Zemfira Meftahatdinova
2002 ISSF World Cup #2	Slovakia	Andrea Stranovská	Andrea Stranovská
2002 ISSF World Cup #3	Finland	Maarit Lepomäki	Maarit Lepomäki
2002 World Championships	Hungary	Diána Igaly	Diána Igaly
2003 ISSF World Cup #1	Italy	Chiara Cainero	Chiara Cainero
2003 ISSF World Cup #3	China	Wei Ning	Wei Ning
2003 European Championships (Shotgun)	Russia	Svetlana Demina	Svetlana Demina
2003 Pan American Games	United States	Brandie Neal	Connie Smotek
2003 World Shotgun Championships	South Korea	Son Hye-kyoung	Kim Yeun-hee
2003 Oceania Championships	Australia	Natalia Rahman	Lauryn Mark
2004 Asian Championships	North Korea	Ri Hyon-ok	Ri Hyon-ok
Athletes qualified in other events	United States		Kimberly Rhode
Total			12
