= Shooting at the 2004 Summer Olympics – Women's 25 metre pistol =

Women's 25 metre pistol at the Games of the XXVIII Olympiad
- Venue: Markópoulo Olympic Shooting; Centre
- Date: August 18, 2004
- Competitors: 37 from 26 nations
- Winning score: 688.2 OR

Medalists
1st place, gold medalist(s)		Mariya Grozdeva	Bulgaria
2nd place, silver medalist(s)		Lenka Hyková	Czech Republic
3rd place, bronze medalist(s)		Irada Ashumova	Azerbaijan

The women's 25 metre pistol competition at the 2004 Summer Olympics was held on August 18 at the Markópoulo Olympic Shooting Centre near Athens, Greece.

The event consisted of two rounds: a qualifier and a final. In the qualifier, each shooter fired 60 shots with a pistol at 25 metres distance. Scores for each shot were in increments of 1, with a maximum score of 10. The first 30 shots were in the precision stage, with series of 5 shots being shot within 5 minutes. The second set of 30 shots gave shooters 3 seconds to take each shot.

The top 8 shooters in the qualifying round moved on to the final round. There, they fired an additional 20 shots. These shots scored in increments of .1, with a maximum score of 10.9. They were fired in four sets of 5 rapid fire shots.

Bulgaria's Mariya Grozdeva smashed a new Olympic record at 688.2 to defend her title in sport pistol shooting, putting her ahead of 19-year-old eventual silver medalist Lenka Hyková of the Czech Republic (687.8) by just a 0.4-point lead. Meanwhile, Azerbaijan's Irada Ashumova, who had notched the first seed earlier in the prelims, claimed the bronze with 687.3 points.

== Records ==
Prior to this competition, the existing world and Olympic records were as follows.

Qualification records
World record	Diana Iorgova (BUL)	594	Milan, Italy	31 May 1994
Olympic record	Tao Luna (CHN)	590	Sydney, Australia	22 September 2000

Final records
World record	Tao Luna (CHN)	695.9 (594+101.9)	Munich, Germany	23 August 2002
Olympic record	Mariya Grozdeva (BUL)	690.3 (589+101.3)	Sydney, Australia	22 September 2000

== Qualification round ==
Rank	Athlete	Country	1	2	3	PR	4	5	6	RF	Total	Notes
1	Irada Ashumova	Azerbaijan	99	96	96	291	100	98	99	297	588	Q
2	Lenka Hyková	Czech Republic	99	98	97	294	98	99	97	294	588	Q
3	Mariya Grozdeva	Bulgaria	96	99	99	294	97	97	97	291	585	Q
4	Chen Ying	China	95	94	98	287	100	99	98	297	584	Q
5	Munkhbayar Dorjsuren	Germany	97	95	94	286	100	99	98	297	583	Q
6	Otryadyn Gündegmaa	Mongolia	96	96	98	290	99	96	98	293	583	Q
7	Seo Joo-hyung	South Korea	95	95	98	288	99	97	98	294	582	Q
8	Nino Salukvadze	Georgia	96	95	95	286	97	98	99	294	580	Q
9	Jasna Šekarić	Serbia and Montenegro	96	96	98	290	99	97	93	289	579	
10	Cao Ying	China	95	97	98	290	93	96	99	288	578	
10	Brigitte Roy	France	95	100	97	292	95	94	97	286	578	
10	Lalita Yauhleuskaya	Australia	94	95	97	286	96	98	98	292	578	
13	Ahn Soo-kyeong	South Korea	94	96	96	286	96	98	97	291	577	
13	Galina Belyayeva	Kazakhstan	96	98	98	292	96	94	95	285	577	
13	María Pilar Fernández	Spain	96	97	96	289	97	92	99	288	577	
13	Michiko Fukushima	Japan	96	95	98	289	98	96	94	288	577	
13	Amanda Mondol	Colombia	97	97	99	293	94	97	93	284	577	
18	Annette Woodward	Australia	94	95	95	284	98	95	99	292	576	
19	Elizabeth Callahan	United States	95	97	94	286	95	98	96	289	575	
19	Yukari Konishi	Japan	94	96	93	283	96	98	98	292	575	
21	Agathi Kassoumi	Greece	92	96	95	283	98	95	98	291	574	
21	Rebecca Snyder	United States	97	96	99	292	89	96	97	282	574	
23	Natalia Paderina	Russia	97	97	94	288	96	96	92	284	572	
23	Claudia Verdicchio	Germany	97	96	95	288	95	91	98	284	572	
25	Yuliya Alipava	Belarus	99	93	94	286	91	96	98	285	571	
26	Yuliya Korostylova	Ukraine	96	95	92	283	91	97	99	287	570	
27	Olena Kostevych	Ukraine	97	92	93	282	95	98	94	287	569	
27	Mirela Skoko-Ćelić	Croatia	96	97	96	289	95	93	92	280	569	
29	Monika Rieder	Switzerland	95	99	99	293	88	93	94	275	568	
30	Zsófia Csonka	Hungary	95	95	94	284	93	95	95	283	567	
31	Galina Belyayeva	Russia	96	95	96	287	96	86	97	279	566	
32	Viktoria Chaika	Belarus	94	93	98	285	89	94	97	280	565	
33	Margarita Tarradell	Cuba	94	93	95	282	93	93	97	283	565	
34	Dorottya Erdős	Hungary	93	91	94	278	94	92	93	279	557	
34	Cornelia Frölich	Switzerland	96	93	93	282	96	86	93	275	557	
36	Carmen Malo	Ecuador	89	91	89	269	95	85	87	267	536	
37	Francis Gorrin	Venezuela	93	89	89	271	87	88	88	263	534	

PR — Precision stage; RF — Rapid fire stage

== Final ==
In 2001, 25 metre pistol final shooting switched to rapid fire style. During this single Olympiad, only two rapid fire series were fired in the finals.

Rank	Athlete	Qual	1	2	Final	Total	Notes
1st place, gold medalist(s)	Mariya Grozdeva (BUL)	585	51.0	52.2	103.2	688.2	OR
2nd place, silver medalist(s)	Lenka Hyková (CZE)	588	48.2	51.6	99.8	687.8	
3rd place, bronze medalist(s)	Irada Ashumova (AZE)	588	51.0	48.3	99.3	687.3	
4	Chen Ying (CHN)	584	50.9	51.3	102.2	686.2	
5	Munkhbayar Dorjsuren (GER)	583	51.0	50.6	101.6	684.6	
6	Otryadyn Gündegmaa (MGL)	583	51.3	49.1	100.4	683.4	
7	Seo Joo-hyung (KOR)	582	47.0	51.8	98.8	680.8	
8	Nino Salukvadze (GEO)	580	49.6	48.7	98.3	678.3	
