= Shooting at the 2004 Summer Olympics – Men's 50 metre pistol =

Men's 50 metre pistol at the Games of the XXVIII Olympiad
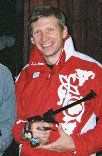
- Mikhail Nestruyev
- Venue: Markópoulo Olympic Shooting Centre
- Date: 17 August 2004
- Competitors: 42 from 31 nations
- Winning score: 663.3

Medalists
1st place, gold medalist(s)		Mikhail Nestruyev; Russia
2nd place, silver medalist(s)		Jin Jong-oh; South Korea
3rd place, bronze medalist(s)		Kim Jong-su; North Korea

The men's ISSF 50 meter pistol competition at the 2004 Summer Olympics was held on 17 August at the Markópoulo Olympic Shooting Centre near Athens, Greece. There were 42 competitors from 31 nations.

Russia's Mikhail Nestruyev, after winning air pistol silver medal, took gold in the event with a total of 663.3, just two points adrift of South Korea's Jin Jong-oh, who left only with the silver on 661.5. Meanwhile, North Korean shooter Kim Jong-su fired a total of 657.7 points to steadily round out the podium with a bronze. Nestruyev's gold was Russia's second victory in the event. Both South Korea and North Korea earned their first medals in the free pistol.

== Background ==
This was the 21st appearance of the ISSF 50 meter pistol event. The event was held at every Summer Olympics from 1896 to 1920 (except 1904, when no shooting events were held) and from 1936 to 2016; it was open to women from 1968 to 1980. 1896 and 1908 were the only Games in which the distance was not 50 metres; the former used 30 metres and the latter 50 yards.

Three of the eight finalists, the medalists, from the 2000 Games returned: gold medalist (and 1992 finalist) Tanyu Kiryakov of Bulgaria, two-time silver medalist (and 1988 bronze medalist) Igor Basinski of Belarus, and bronze medalist (and 1988 finalist) Martin Tenk of the Czech Republic. Tan Zongliang of China was the reigning (2002) world champion, with Tenk the runner-up.

Armenia and Serbia and Montenegro each made their debut in the event. The United States made its 19th appearance, most of any nation, having missed only the 1900 event and the boycotted 1980 Games.

Nestruyev used a Morini CM84E.

== Qualification ==
Each National Olympic Committee (NOC) could enter up to two shooters if the NOC earned enough quota sports or had enough crossover-qualified shooters. To compete, a shooter needed a quota spot and to achieve a Minimum Qualification Score (MQS). Once a shooter was using a quota spot in any shooting event, they could enter any other shooting event for which they had achieved the MQS as well (a crossover qualification). There were 21 quota spots available for the free pistol: 4 at the 2002 World Cup events, 5 at the 2002 World Championship, 4 at the 2003 World Cup events, 2 at each of the 2003 European Championships, 2003 Pan American Games, and 2004 Asian Championships, and 1 each at the 2003 Oceania Championships and 2003 African Championships. One additional quota place was added through the exchange system. There were also 20 shooters who double-started into the free pistol, primarily from the 10 metre air pistol event.

== Competition format ==
The competition featured two rounds, qualifying and final. The qualifying round was the same as the previous competitions: each shooter fired 60 shots, in 6 series of 10 shots each, at a distance of 50 metres. The target was round, 50 centimetres in diameter, with 10 scoring rings. Scoring for each shot was up to 10 points, in increments of 1 point. The maximum score possible was 600 points. The top 8 shooters advanced to a final; ties necessary for qualifying were broken by 6th-series score, while other ties were not broken. They shot an additional series of 10 shots, with the score added to their qualifying round score to give a 70-shot total. The 1996 competition had added decimal scoring to the final; shots could score up to 10.9 for the final. The total maximum was therefore 709.0. Ties were broken first by final round score. Any pistol was permitted.

== Records ==
Prior to this competition, the existing world and Olympic records were as follows.

Qualifying (60 shots)
World record	Aleksandr Melentiev (URS)	581	Moscow, Soviet Union	20 July 1980
Olympic record	Aleksandr Melentiev (URS)	581	Moscow, Soviet Union	20 July 1980

Final (70 shots)
World record	William Demarest (USA)	676.2 (577+99.2)	Milan, Italy	4 June 2000
Olympic record	Boris Kokorev (RUS)	666.4 (570+96.4)	Atlanta, United States	23 July 1996

No new world or Olympics records were set during the competition.

== Schedule ==
Date	Time	Round
Tuesday, 17 August 2004	9:00; 12:15	Qualifying; Final

== Results ==
=== Qualifying ===
Rank	Shooter	Nation	1	2	3	4	5	6	Total	Notes
1	Jin Jong-oh	South Korea	94	94	93	96	95	95	567	Q
2	Mikhail Nestruyev	Russia	92	92	94	93	98	96	565	Q
3	Kim Jong-su	North Korea	92	95	91	97	94	95	564	Q
4	Norayr Bakhtamyan	Armenia	91	96	94	96	93	94	564	Q
5	Isidro Lorenzo	Spain	95	93	90	92	98	94	562	Q
6	Tanyu Kiryakov	Bulgaria	92	96	95	93	94	92	562	Q
7	Vladimir Issachenko	Kazakhstan	96	92	93	92	95	93	561	Q
8	Boris Kokorev	Russia	94	92	90	95	93	96	560	Q
9	Martin Tenk	Czech Republic	91	96	92	92	95	93	559	
10	Viktor Makarov	Ukraine	95	94	94	92	91	92	558	
10	Tan Zongliang	China	96	90	94	92	96	90	558	
12	Francesco Bruno	Italy	94	91	97	91	93	90	556	
12	João Costa	Portugal	97	90	90	94	91	94	556	
12	Vigilio Fait	Italy	94	88	92	92	96	94	556	
15	Igor Basinski	Belarus	91	90	96	96	91	90	554	
15	Alexander Danilov	Israel	90	91	90	95	92	96	554	
15	Daryl Szarenski	United States	90	93	89	97	94	91	554	
18	Sorin Babii	Romania	91	92	95	93	89	93	553	
18	Kim Hyon-ung	North Korea	91	96	90	91	90	95	553	
18	Frank Seeger	Germany	91	92	97	88	94	91	553	
18	Jason Turner	United States	93	92	93	91	91	93	553	
18	Xu Dan	China	92	90	97	93	91	90	553	
23	Daniel Repacholi	Australia	97	91	93	93	87	90	551	
24	Franck Dumoulin	France	88	91	92	94	93	92	550	
24	Lee Sang-do	South Korea	92	91	96	90	88	93	550	
24	David Moore	Australia	86	95	86	92	96	95	550	
24	Abdulla Ustaoglu	Germany	93	93	96	91	85	92	550	
28	Dionissios Georgakopoulos	Greece	97	91	91	87	90	93	549	
28	Jakkrit Panichpatikum	Thailand	93	91	92	92	86	95	549	
30	Chang Yi-ning	Chinese Taipei	91	90	91	92	91	93	548	
30	Maximo Modesti	Argentina	92	88	91	90	92	95	548	
32	Andrija Zlatić	Serbia and Montenegro	90	92	91	92	89	92	546	
33	Roger Daniel	Trinidad and Tobago	92	91	91	89	93	89	545	
34	Norbelis Bárzaga	Cuba	90	86	90	93	88	95	542	
34	José Antonio Colado	Spain	90	88	90	92	91	91	542	
36	Attila Simon	Hungary	89	90	92	92	89	89	541	
37	Kanstantsin Lukashyk	Belarus	88	86	93	94	89	89	539	
38	Masaru Nakashige	Japan	90	86	94	89	87	91	537	
39	Wojciech Knapik	Poland	92	86	89	91	88	90	536	
40	Arseny Borrero	Cuba	87	90	89	90	91	88	535	
41	Chris Rice	Virgin Islands	88	86	93	90	88	84	529	
41	Friedhelm Sack	Namibia	86	86	88	92	87	90	529	

=== Final ===
Rank	Shooter	Nation	Qualifying	Final											Total
Rank	Shooter	Nation	Qualifying	1	2	3	4	5	6	7	8	9	10	Total	Total
1st place, gold medalist(s)	Mikhail Nestruyev	Russia	565	10.4	9.9	9.3	10.4	10.0	9.7	8.9	9.8	9.3	10.6	98.3	663.3
2nd place, silver medalist(s)	Jin Jong-oh	South Korea	567	9.8	10.5	7.6	9.9	10.1	10.4	6.9	9.8	9.7	9.8	94.5	661.5
3rd place, bronze medalist(s)	Kim Jong-su	North Korea	564	9.0	10.9	9.0	8.4	9.6	9.8	9.2	9.4	8.7	9.7	93.7	657.7
4	Norayr Bakhtamyan	Armenia	564	9.4	10.0	8.4	10.6	8.9	9.2	7.7	7.1	10.0	9.5	90.8	654.8
5	Boris Kokorev	Russia	560	10.8	9.1	9.2	9.9	9.3	10.4	10.0	7.9	8.9	9.1	94.6	654.6
6	Vladimir Issachenko	Kazakhstan	561	8.9	8.9	8.8	9.9	9.9	7.8	8.6	9.9	10.6	10.2	93.5	654.5
7	Tanyu Kiryakov	Bulgaria	562	9.4	9.4	10.6	7.8	9.9	8.7	9.5	8.7	8.5	9.8	92.3	654.3
8	Isidro Lorenzo	Spain	562	10.7	7.0	10.3	9.2	9.5	8.9	7.7	8.6	9.3	8.8	90.0	652.0
