= Susanne Meyerhoff =

Danish sports shooter (born 1974)

Personal information
- Full name: Susanne Maria Meyerhoff
- Nationality: Denmark
- Born: 7 July 1974 (age 52) Kalundborg, Denmark
- Height: 1.73 m (5 ft 8 in)
- Weight: 60 kg (132 lb)

Sport
- Sport: Shooting
- Events: 10 m air pistol (AP40); 25 m pistol (SP)
- Club: Hvidebæk Skytteforening
Medal record
Women's shooting
Representing Denmark
European Championships
Gold medal – first place	1999 Arnhem	AP40
Gold medal – first place	2002 Thessaloniki	AP40
Gold medal – first place	2003 Gothenburg	AP40
Gold medal – first place	2006 Moscow	AP40
Bronze medal – third place	1998 Tallinn	AP40
Bronze medal – third place	2004 Győr	AP40

Susanne Maria Meyerhoff (born 7 July 1974) is a Danish sport shooter. She has competed for Denmark in pistol shooting at three Olympics (1996 to 2004), and has recorded a career tally of eighteen medals in a major international competition, a total of seven (four golds, one silver, and two bronze) under both junior and senior categories at the European Championships, a total of ten (three golds, four silver, and three bronze) at numerous meets of the ISSF World Cup series, and a silver as a junior at the 1994 ISSF World Championships in Milan, Italy.

== Career ==
Meyerhoff started out as a successful junior at the age of eighteen, and eventually became a runner-up in air pistol shooting at the European Championships in Milan, Italy, when she was twenty. Two years later, Meyerhoff competed internationally on her senior debut for Denmark at the 1996 Summer Olympics in Atlanta, finishing fifteenth in the air pistol and thirty-fourth in the sport pistol with scores of 379 and 564 respectively.

Between 1997 and 1999, Meyerhoff was able to back up her performance from the Olympics by successfully claiming gold medals in air pistol at three meets of the ISSF World Cup series. She also simultaneously captured her first ever European title on the same discipline that marvelously culminated in a selection of being one of the favorites vying for an Olympic medal at the succeeding Games.

On her second appearance in Sydney 2000, Meyerhoff put up a dismal display from her outstanding pre-Olympic aim in shooting, as she stumbled down the leaderboard to a distant thirty-fifth in the air pistol with 372, and then shot a tally of 562 (289 in precision and 273 in the rapid-fire) to force in a two-way tie alongside Germany's Anke Schumann for thirty-ninth place in the sport pistol.

Meyerhoff showed her most potential form in bouncing back to the range at the 2002 European Championships in Thessaloniki, Greece, claiming the gold for the first time in air pistol after four years at 486.2 points. The next season contributed to a tremendous success for Meyerhoff, as she dominated the field to defend her European title in Gothenburg, Sweden with a personal best of 492.7. She had gone into the 2003 ISSF World Cup meet in Munich, Germany, having registered a minimum qualifying score of 384 to assure an Olympic quota place for Denmark on her third Games.

At the 2004 Summer Olympics in Athens, Meyerhoff decided to focus on her signature event, the women's 10 m air pistol. She fired a substandard 379 out of a possible 400 to force in a four-way tie with South Korea's Park Ah-young, Hungary's Dorottya Erdős, and Australia's Lalita Yauhleuskaya for twenty-first place in the qualifying round, finishing five points below the Olympic final cutoff.

== Personal life ==
Meyerhoff is the mother of 4 children: Julie (1997), Viktoria (2001), William (2008) and August (2012). and married to skeet shooter and 2004 Olympian Michael Nielsen.

== Olympic results ==
Event	1992	1996	2004
25 metre pistol	34th 564	39th 562	—N/a
10 metre air pistol	15th 379	35th 372	21st 379
