= Maria Faka =

Greek sport shooter

Personal information
- Full name: Maria Faka
- Nationality: Greece
- Born: 25 October 1983 (age 42) Thessaloniki, Greece
- Height: 1.63 m (5 ft 4 in)
- Weight: 75 kg (165 lb)

Sport
- Sport: Shooting
- Event: 10 m air rifle (AR40)
- Club: Arhelaos Katerinis
- Coached by: Konstantinos Myrotis

Maria Faka (Greek: Μαρία Φάκα; born January 2, 1979, in Thessaloniki) is a Greek sport shooter. She was selected as one of eleven shooters to represent the host nation Greece at the 2004 Summer Olympics in Athens, and had yielded numerous top 25 finishes in a major international competition, spanning the ISSF World Cup series and the European Championships. Faka trains at Arhelaos Katerinis Shooting Club in Katerini under the tutelage of Konstantinos Myrotis.

Faka was named as part of the host nation's shooting team to compete in the women's 10 m air rifle at the 2004 Summer Olympics in Athens. She had registered a minimum qualifying score of 393 from her outside-final finish at the ISSF World Cup meet in Changwon, South Korea to fill in one of the Olympic berths reserved to the host nation. Faka shot a decent 388 out of a possible 400 to tie for thirty-third place with Belgium's Daisy de Bock, Denmark's Ann Spejlsgaard, and Egypt's Shimaa Abdel-Latif in the qualifying round, failing to advance further to the final.
