= Beáta Krzyzewsky =

Hungarian sport shooter

Personal information
- Full name: Beáta Krzyzewsky
- Nationality: Hungary
- Born: 28 August 1976 (age 50) Budapest, Hungary
- Height: 1.64 m (5 ft 4 1/2 in)
- Weight: 53 kg (117 lb)

Sport
- Sport: Shooting
- Events: 10 m air rifle (AR40); 50 m rifle prone (STR60PR); 50 m rifle 3 positions (STR3X20)
- Club: Angyalföldi Polgári Lövész; Egyesület
- Coached by: György Slita
Medal record
Women's shooting
Representing Hungary
European Championships
Gold medal – first place	2007 Granada	STR60PR

Beáta Krzyzewsky (born 28 August 1976 in Budapest) is a Hungarian sport shooter. She competed for Hungary in rifle shooting at the 2004 Summer Olympics, and has won a gold medal in small-bore rifle prone at the 2007 European Championships in Granada, Spain. Krzyzewsky trains for the Angyalföldi Civilian Rifle Association in Budapest under her longtime coach György Slita.

Krzyzewsky qualified for the Hungarian team in women's rifle shooting at the 2004 Summer Olympics in Athens. She managed to get a minimum qualifying standard of 583 in small-bore rifle three positions to join with fellow markswoman and four-time Olympian Éva Joó and secure an Olympic berth for Hungary, following her bronze medal triumph at the ISSF World Cup meet in Changwon, South Korea a year earlier. In the 10 m air rifle, held on the first day of the Games, Krzyzewsky fired a modest 387 out of a possible 400 to obtain a thirty-seventh position throughout a 44-shooter field. Nearly a week later, in the 50 m rifle 3 positions, Krzyzewsky put up another substandard aim to land in thirty-first with a total score of 560 points (a scintillating 195 in prone, 178 in standing and 187 in the kneeling series).

In 2007, Krzyzewsky showed her most potential form in bouncing back to the range by claiming her first individual gold in the small-bore rifle prone at the European Championships in Granada, Spain, shooting comfortably at 591 points.

Outside her shooting career, Krzyzewsky is a political science graduate at Pázmány Péter Catholic University, and currently works as a professional lawyer.
