= José Antonio Colado =

Spanish sports shooter

Personal information
- Full name: José Antonio Colado Castro
- Nationality: Spain
- Born: 30 October 1976 (age 50) Seville, Spain
- Height: 1.61 m (5 ft 3 1/2 in)
- Weight: 60 kg (132 lb)

Sport
- Sport: Shooting
- Events: 10 m air pistol (AP60); 50 m pistol (FP)
- Club: Club Precisión Triana
- Coached by: Cezary Staniszewski

José Antonio Colado Castro (Note: In this Spanish name, the first or paternal surname is Colado and the second or maternal family name is Castro.) (born 30 October 1976 in Seville) is a retired Spanish sport shooter. He has been selected to compete for Spain in pistol shooting at the 2004 Summer Olympics, and has attained top 8 finishes in a major international competition, spanning the Mediterranean Games and the ISSF World Cup series. Colado also trains under head coach Cezary Staniszewski for twelve years as a full-fledged member of the Spanish pistol shooting team.

Colado qualified for the Spanish team in pistol shooting at the 2004 Summer Olympics in Athens. He managed to get a minimum qualifying score of 578 to gain an Olympic quota place for Spain in the air pistol, following his outside-final finish at the European Championships in Gothenburg, Sweden one year earlier. In the 10 m air pistol, held on the first day of the Games, Colado shot a total of 572 to force a two-way tie with host nation Greece's Dionissios Georgakopoulos for a lowly thirty-third place, slashing six points off from his entry standard. Three days later, in the 50 m pistol, Colado put up another dismal display from his air pistol feat to end up in a thirty-fourth place tie with Cuba's Norbelis Bárzaga at 542, trailing his fellow marksman Isidro Lorenzo by a wide, twenty-point gap.

In early 2015, Colado served full-time as the sports technical director of the pistol team for the Royal Spanish Olympic Shooting Federation (Spanish: Real Federación Española de Tiro Olímpico), just eleven years since his immediate Olympic debut.
