= Diego Duarte (sports shooter) =

Colombian sport shooter (born 1970)

Diego Duarte Delgado
Personal information
- Full name: Diego Duarte Delgado
- Born: 20 October 1970 (age 55) Bucaramanga, Santander, Colombia
- Height: 1.78 m (5 ft 10 in)
- Weight: 80 kg (176 lb)
- Website: Instagram @diegoduarteshotgunacademy

Sport
- Country: Colombia
- Sport: Shooting
- Event(s): Skeet, Sporting Clays, Double Trap Men
- Club: Club Cazandes, Waunakee Gun Club
- Team: Professional Sporting Clays Association PSCA
- Turned pro: 2013
- Coached by: Diego Duarte Shotgun Academy
- Now coaching: Skeet, Sporting Clays

Achievements and titles
- World finals: International Skeet
Medal record
Representing Colombia
Men's shooting
| Event | 1st | 2nd | 3rd |
|---|---|---|---|
| World Cup | 1 | 0 | 0 |
| Pan American Games | 0 | 0 | 1 |
| CAC Games | 2 | 1 | 1 |
| Bolivarian Games | 2 | 2 | 3 |
| Total | 5 | 3 | 5 |
World Cup
| Gold medal – first place | 2003 Lonato | Skeet |
Pan American Games
| Bronze medal – third place | 2003 Santo Domingo | Skeet |
Central American and Caribbean Games
| Gold medal – first place | 2002 San Salvador | Skeet |
| Gold medal – first place | 2002 San Salvador | Skeet team |
| Silver medal – second place | 2006 Cartagena | Skeet team |
| Bronze medal – third place | 2010 Mayagüez | Skeet |
Bolivarian Games
| Gold medal – first place | 2001 Ambato | Skeet |
| Gold medal – first place | 2017 Santa Marta | Skeet |
| Silver medal – second place | 2009 Sucre | Skeet team |
| Silver medal – second place | 2013 Trujillo | 75 sporting clays team |
| Bronze medal – third place | 2009 Sucre | Skeet |
| Bronze medal – third place | 2013 Trujillo | 75 sporting clays |
| Bronze medal – third place | 2013 Trujillo | Double trap team |
US Open Shooting
| Bronze medal – third place | 2014 Kansas | Sporting clays |

Diego Duarte Delgado (born October 20, 1970, in Bucaramanga, Santander) is a Colombian sport shooter. He won the World Championships in Skeet Men at Lonato World Cup 2003, defeating Eric Wandtdal and Olympic silver medalist Tore Brovold, Diego also is holder of the Panamerican Record with 149/150, He won a bronze medal in men's skeet shooting at the 2003 Pan American Games in Santo Domingo, Dominican Republic, with a total score of 148 points.

Duarte made his official debut for the 2004 Summer Olympics in Athens, where he placed fifteenth in men's skeet shooting, with a total score of 120 points, tying his position with five other shooters, including Russia's Valeriy Shomin and Australia's Paul Rahman.

At the 2008 Summer Olympics in Beijing, Duarte competed for the second time, as a 38-year-old, in men's skeet shooting. He finished only in thirty-eighth place by three points behind Qatar's Rashid Saleh Hamad from the final attempt, for a total score of 106 points.
