= Monika Rieder =

Swiss sport shooter (born 1974)

Personal information
- Full name: Monika Rieder
- Nationality: Switzerland
- Born: 16 August 1974 (age 52) Rüti, Switzerland
- Height: 1.75 m (5 ft 9 in)
- Weight: 75 kg (165 lb)

Sport
- Sport: Shooting
- Events: 10 m air pistol (AP40); 25 m pistol (SP)
- Club: Pistolschützen Bubikon
- Coached by: Krzysztof Kucharczyk

Monika Rieder (born 16 August 1974, in Rüti) is a Swiss sport shooter.

== Career ==
She has been selected to compete for Switzerland in pistol shooting at the 2004 Summer Olympics, and has attained top eight finishes in a major international competition, spanning the ISSF World Cup series and the European Championships. Rieder trains under Polish-born head coach and four-time Olympian Krzysztof Kucharczyk for the national team, while shooting at Bubikon Pistol Shooting Range (German: Pistolschützen Bubikon) on the outskirts of her hometown Rüti.

Rieder qualified for the Swiss squad in pistol shooting at the 2004 Summer Olympics in Athens. She managed to get a minimum qualifying score of 383 in air pistol to join with her fellow markswoman Cornelia Frölich and fill in the Olympic quota place won by Angela Schuler from the 2003 European Championships for Switzerland, after finishing fourth in an Olympic test event at the ISSF World Cup meet few months earlier. In her signature event, the 10 m air pistol, Rieder fired a frustrating 366 out of a possible 400 to force in a two-way tie with China's defending Olympic champion Tao Luna for thirty-eighth place. Two days later, Rieder recompensed her bitter air pistol feat to shoot a brilliant 293 in precision and a lowly 275 in the rapid fire stage for a tally of 568 points in the 25 m pistol, but her results were good enough to put her in twenty-ninth position out of thirty-seven shooters.
