= Shooting at the 2004 Summer Olympics – Women's 50 metre rifle three positions =

Women's 50 metre rifle three positions at the Games of the XXVIII Olympiad
- Venue: Markópoulo Olympic Shooting; Centre
- Date: August 20, 2004
- Competitors: 32 from 22 nations
- Winning score: 689.4 OR

Medalists
1st place, gold medalist(s)		Lioubov Galkina	Russia
2nd place, silver medalist(s)		Valentina Turisini	Italy
3rd place, bronze medalist(s)		Wang Chengyi	China

The women's 50 metre rifle three positions competition at the 2004 Summer Olympics was held on August 20 at the Markópoulo Olympic Shooting Centre near Athens, Greece.

The event consisted of two rounds: a qualifier and a final. In the qualifier, each shooter fired 60 shots with a .22 Long Rifle at 50 metres distance. 20 shots were fired each from the standing, kneeling, and prone positions. Scores for each shot were in increments of 1, with a maximum score of 10.

The top 8 shooters in the qualifying round moved on to the final round. There, they fired an additional 10 shots, all from the standing position. These shots scored in increments of .1, with a maximum score of 10.9. The total score from all 70 shots was used to determine final ranking.

Russia's Lioubov Galkina fired an outstanding 101.4 for the gold in the rifle three positions finale, demolishing a new Olympic record score of 689.4. Italy's Valentina Turisini took the silver with a score of 685.9, while China's Wang Chengyi rounded out the podium with a bronze at 685.4. Kazakhstan's Olga Dovgun, who had led the field with a qualifying score of 588 earlier in the prelims, one point adrift of Galkina, slipped out of the medals with the most disastrous round of any of the eight finalists, getting just 96.9 points for a total of 684.9 to end up fourth.

== Records ==
Prior to this competition, the existing world and Olympic records were as follows.

Qualification records
World record	Shan Hong (CHN)	592	Milan, Italy	28 May 1999
Olympic record	Renata Mauer (POL)	589	Atlanta, United States	24 July 1996

Final records
World record	Wang Xian (CHN)	689.7 (591+98.7)	Milan, Italy	29 May 1998
Olympic record	Aleksandra Ivošev (YUG)	686.1 (587+99.1)	Atlanta, United States	24 July 1996

== Qualification round ==
Rank	Athlete	Country	1	2	PR	3	4	ST	5	6	KN	Total	Notes
1	Olga Dovgun	Kazakhstan	100	100	200	97	96	193	96	99	195	588	Q
2	Lioubov Galkina	Russia	99	100	199	94	97	191	98	99	197	587	Q
3	Valentina Turisini	Italy	98	99	197	96	97	193	100	95	195	585	Q
4	Wang Chengyi	China	99	97	196	97	98	195	96	97	193	584	Q
5	Lee Hye-jin	South Korea	99	97	196	98	99	197	96	95	191	584	Q
6	Sonja Pfeilschifter	Germany	99	99	198	98	94	192	95	97	192	582	Q
7	Barbara Lechner	Germany	99	98	197	93	96	189	99	95	194	580	Q
8	Natallia Kalnysh	Ukraine	96	98	194	95	92	187	99	99	198	579	Q
9	Laurence Brize	France	97	99	196	97	98	195	96	91	187	578	
9	Tatiana Goldobina	Russia	99	100	199	95	94	189	94	96	190	578	
9	Wu Liuxi	China	97	98	195	95	96	191	96	96	192	578	
12	Morgan Hicks	United States	98	99	197	94	95	189	96	95	191	577	
13	Anjali Bhagwat	India	97	96	193	97	96	193	92	97	189	575	
13	Gaby Bühlmann	Switzerland	98	96	194	95	94	189	98	94	192	575	
13	Lessia Leskiv	Ukraine	97	95	192	94	96	190	98	95	193	575	
16	Valérie Bellenoue	France	98	100	198	92	96	188	96	92	188	574	
17	Sylwia Bogacka	Poland	97	96	193	95	95	190	98	92	190	573	
17	Renata Mauer-Różańska	Poland	98	98	196	92	95	187	96	94	190	573	
19	Deepali Deshpande	India	97	97	194	94	95	189	94	95	189	572	
20	Sarah Blakeslee	United States	98	99	197	93	92	185	94	95	189	571	
20	Eglis Yaima Cruz	Cuba	96	98	194	90	95	185	95	97	192	571	
20	Marjo Yli-Kiikka	Finland	98	98	196	93	98	191	91	93	184	571	
23	Éva Joó	Hungary	96	99	195	93	94	187	96	92	188	570	
24	Hiromi Misaki	Japan	97	98	195	95	90	185	99	90	189	569	
25	Susan McCready	Australia	95	99	194	95	92	187	93	93	186	567	
25	Pushpamali Ramanayake	Sri Lanka	98	97	195	91	90	181	97	94	191	567	
27	Kateřina Kůrková	Czech Republic	99	100	199	91	90	181	95	90	185	565	
28	Svitlana Kashchenko	Nicaragua	95	94	189	89	94	183	95	96	191	563	
29	Alyona Aksyonova	Uzbekistan	96	97	193	87	92	179	96	94	190	562	
30	Kim Jung-mi	South Korea	96	95	191	88	91	179	95	96	191	561	
31	Beáta Krzyzewsky	Hungary	97	98	195	88	90	178	93	94	187	560	
32	Kim Frazer	Australia	97	95	192	88	91	179	91	93	184	555	
32	Divna Pešić	Macedonia	94	94	188	95	87	182	95	90	185	555	

KN — Kneeling position; PR — Prone position; ST — Standing position

== Final ==
Rank	Athlete	Qual	1	2	3	4	5	6	7	8	9	10	Final	Total	Notes
1st place, gold medalist(s)	Lioubov Galkina (RUS)	587	10.4	10.9	8.2	9.9	9.8	10.4	10.4	10.6	10.2	10.6	101.4	688.4	OR
2nd place, silver medalist(s)	Valentina Turisini (ITA)	585	9.8	8.8	9.5	10.4	10.1	10.5	10.7	10.2	10.7	10.2	100.9	685.9	
3rd place, bronze medalist(s)	Wang Chengyi (CHN)	584	10.1	10.3	10.6	10.3	10.4	10.6	10.2	9.8	9.2	9.9	101.4	685.4	
4	Olga Dovgun (KAZ)	588	7.9	10.5	9.8	9.6	10.6	10.2	8.7	9.4	10.1	10.1	96.9	684.9	
5	Lee Hye-jin (KOR)	584	9.6	9.7	8.0	10.2	10.7	10.3	9.4	9.4	9.3	10.4	97.0	681.0	
6	Sonja Pfeilschifter (GER)	582	10.6	9.2	9.6	9.1	9.8	8.4	10.2	10.8	10.3	9.6	97.6	679.6	
7	Barbara Lechner (GER)	580	8.9	9.4	10.4	10.6	9.8	9.0	10.4	10.5	9.1	9.5	97.6	677.6	
8	Natallia Kalnysh (UKR)	579	10.4	8.8	9.5	10.3	9.7	9.2	10.2	10.1	10.2	9.8	98.2	677.2	
