= Marina Karaflou =

Greek sport shooter

Personal information
- Full name: Marina Karaflou
- Nationality: Greece
- Born: 10 March 1980 (age 46) Volos, Greece
- Height: 1.60 m (5 ft 3 in)
- Weight: 64 kg (141 lb)

Sport
- Sport: Shooting
- Event(s): 10 m air pistol (AP40); 25 m pistol (SP)
- Club: Volos Shooting Club
- Coached by: Mihailis Nikolaidis

Marina Karaflou (Greek: Μαρίνα Καραφλού; born 10 March 1980 in Volos) is a Greek sport shooter. She was selected as one of eleven shooters to represent the host nation Greece at the 2004 Summer Olympics in Athens, and also attained top eight finishes in pistol shooting at various meets of the ISSF World Cup series. Karaflou is a member of Volos Shooting Club under her longtime coach Mihailis Nikolaidis.

Karaflou was named as part of the host nation's shooting team to compete in the women's 10 m air pistol at the 2004 Summer Olympics in Athens. She had registered a minimum qualifying score of 384 from her top eight finish at the ISSF World Cup meet in Zagreb, Croatia to fill in the Olympic berth reserved to the host nation, after the Hellenic Shooting Federation decided to exchange spots in her signature event with the unused quota from the women's trap. Karaflou fired a substantial 377 out of a possible 400 to force in a two-way tie with Hungary's Zsófia Csonka for twenty-sixth place in the qualifying round, failing to advance further to the final.
