= Éva Joó =

Hungarian sport shooter

Personal information
- Full name: Éva Joó
- Nationality: Hungary
- Born: 12 April 1970 (age 56) Dunaújváros, Hungary
- Height: 1.52 m (5 ft 0 in)
- Weight: 60 kg (132 lb)

Sport
- Sport: Shooting
- Events: 10 m air rifle (AR40); 50 m rifle 3 positions (STR3X20)
- Club: Újpesti TE
- Coached by: László Hammerl
Medal record
Women's shooting
Representing Hungary
World Championships
Gold medal – first place	1990 Moscow	AR40
European Championships
Gold medal – first place	1988 Stavanger	AR40
Gold medal – first place	1990 Arnhem	AR40
Silver medal – second place	1997 Warsaw	AR40
Bronze medal – third place	1989 Copenhagen	AR40

Éva Joó (born 12 April 1970, in Dunaújváros) is a Hungarian sport shooter. She has competed for Hungary in rifle shooting at four Olympics (1988 to 1996, 2004), and has been close to an Olympic medal in 1996 (finishing seventh in the air rifle). Apart from her Olympic career, Joo has successfully produced a career tally of nineteen medals in a major international competition: a gold at the 1990 ISSF World Championships in Moscow, Soviet Union, a total of three (one gold and two bronze) at the ISSF World Cup final, a total of nine (one gold, five silver, and eight bronze) at various meets of the World Cup series, and a remainder of six (three gold, two silver, and one bronze) under both junior and senior categories at the European Championships since her sporting debut in 1987.

== Career ==
Having started the sport since the age of twelve, Joo trained under the tutelage of Dr. László Hammerl for the Hungarian National Defense Association (Hungarian: Magyar Honvédelmi Szövetség KLK, MHSZ) in Budapest, and eventually for the national team at Újpesti Sports Academy (Hungarian: Újpesti Torna Egylet).

Joo competed internationally for Hungary at the age of seventeen, and simultaneously pocketed her first medal with a gold in air rifle shooting at the 1987 European Championships in Lahti, Finland. The following year, Joo made her first Hungarian team, as an 18-year-old teen, at the 1988 Summer Olympics in Seoul, finishing eleventh in the air rifle and twentieth in the small-bore rifle three positions with scores of 392 and 576 respectively.

In 1990, Joo set a junior world record of 496.4 to capture her first ever air rifle title at the Worlds in Moscow, Soviet Union, and then collected another gold at the European Championships in Arnhem, Netherlands with 495.4. Joo's magnificent world-record feat culminated in a selection of being one of clear favorites vying for an Olympic medal at her succeeding Games in Barcelona 1992. There, she finished fifteenth in her pet event, the air rifle, with a score of 390, but eventually ascended to eighth on a marvelous aim in the rifle three positions at 673.6 points, despite losing in a seventh-place duel to Canada's Sharon Bowes.

Shortly after her second Games, Joo showed her most potential form in bouncing back to the range by clinching her first ISSF World Cup title in the air rifle final at Munich, Germany a year later, ending up in first place with a personal best of 497.6.

On her third Olympic appearance in Atlanta 1996, Joo landed to her best finish of the meet at seventh position in the 10 m air rifle after she nailed 494.5 on the final match to discreetly elude Ukraine's Lessia Leskiv from last place by just three-tenths of a point (0.3). Joo also competed in the 50 m rifle 3 positions, but failed to reach the final, as she flubbed a few shots in the kneeling stage that saw her plunge down the leaderboard to a tie for twentieth with China's Chen Muhua at 576, just a deficit of five points from the cutoff.

At the 2004 Summer Olympics in Athens, Joo qualified for her historic fourth Hungarian team, as a 34-year-old, in rifle shooting. She managed to get a qualifying score of 580 in the rifle three positions to join with fellow markswoman and debutant Beáta Krzyzewsky and secure an Olympic berth for Hungary after capping off her remarkable eight-year comeback with a fifth-place feat at the ISSF World Cup meet in Fort Benning, Georgia, United States less than a year earlier. In the 10 m air rifle, held on the first day of the competition, Joo fired a substantial 394 out of a possible 400 to force in a massive draw with five other shooters for fourteenth place, having been much closer to an Olympic final at a slim disadvantage of two points. Nearly a week later, in the 50 m rifle 3 positions, Joo marked 195 in prone, a lowly 187 in standing, and 188 in the kneeling series to close her historic Olympic run out of the final in twenty-third position with a total score of 570 points.

== Olympic results ==
Event	1988	1992	1996	2004
50 metre rifle three positions	20th 576	8th 580+93.6	20th 576	23rd 570
10 metre air rifle	11th 392	15th 390	7th 393+101.5	14th 394
