= Wojciech Knapik =

Polish sports shooter (born 1980)

Personal information
- Full name: Wojciech Michał Knapik
- Nationality: Poland
- Born: 24 July 1980 (age 45) Opole, Poland
- Height: 1.71 m (5 ft 7 1/2 in)
- Weight: 77 kg (170 lb)

Sport
- Sport: Shooting
- Event(s): 10 m air pistol (AP60); 50 m pistol (FP)
- Club: Zawisza Bydgoszcz
- Coached by: Iwanov Radomir

Wojciech Michał Knapik (born July 24, 1980 in Opole) is a Polish sport shooter. Since 2001, Knapik had won a total of four medals at the ISSF World Cup circuit, including gold for the 10 m air pistol (2003 in Changwon, South Korea).

Knapik made his official debut at the 2004 Summer Olympics in Athens, where he finished eleventh in the men's 10 m air pistol, with a score of 580 points, tying his position with four-time Olympian and two-time silver medalist Igor Basinski of Belarus. He also competed in the men's 50 m pistol event, where he was able to shoot a total of 536 targets, finishing only in thirty-ninth place.

At the 2008 Summer Olympics in Beijing, Knapik competed for the second time in two pistol shooting events. He placed twenty-fourth out of forty-eight shooters in the men's 10 m air pistol, with a total score of 577 points. Three days later, Knapik competed for his second event, 50 m rifle pistol, where he was able to fire 10 shots each in six attempts, for a total score of 543 points, finishing again in thirty-ninth place.

== Olympic results ==
Event	2004	2008	2012
50 metre pistol	39th 536	39th 543	—
10 metre air pistol	11th 580	24th 577	—
