= Martin Senore =

South African sport shooter

Personal information
- Full name: Martin Senore
- Nationality: South Africa
- Born: 6 May 1968 (age 58) Pretoria, South Africa
- Height: 1.84 m (6 ft 1/2 in)
- Weight: 107 kg (236 lb)

Sport
- Sport: Shooting
- Event(s): 50 m rifle prone (FR60PR); 50 m rifle 3 positions (FR3X40)
- Club: Eagle Eye Shooting Centre
- Coached by: Hubert Bichler

Martin Senore (born 6 May 1968 in Pretoria) is a South African sport shooter. He has been selected to compete for South Africa in small-bore rifle shooting at the 2004 Summer Olympics, and has achieved a total of two medals, a gold and a bronze, at two editions of the African Championships. Senore trains full-time at Eagle Eye Shooting Centre in Pretoria under his longtime coach Hubert Bichler.

Senore qualified as a sole shooter for the South African squad in the men's 50 m rifle prone at the 2004 Summer Olympics in Athens. He managed to get a minimum qualifying score of 597 to fill in the Olympic quota place for South Africa, which was previously awarded to his brother Fred Senore, following his fourth-place feat at the ISSF World Cup meet in Munich, Germany. Senore recorded a lowly 588 out of a possible 600 from his 60 shots to occupy a thirty-ninth position in a vast field of forty-six shooters, failing to advance to the final.
