= Lo Ka Kay =

Hong Kong sport shooter

Personal information
- Full name: Cynthia Lo Ka Kay
- Nationality: Hong Kong
- Born: 27 July 1982 (age 43) Hong Kong, Hong Kong
- Height: 1.65 m (5 ft 5 in)
- Weight: 53 kg (117 lb)

Sport
- Sport: Shooting
- Event: 10 m air pistol (AP40)
- Club: Hong Kong Rifle Association
- Coached by: Wong Fai

Cynthia Lo Ka Kay (Chinese: 嘉琪 盧; pinyin: Jiā Qílú; born July 27, 1982, in Hong Kong Island) is a Hong Kong sport shooter. She has been selected to compete for Hong Kong at the 2004 Summer Olympics, and trains under head coach and eventual 2008 Olympian Wong Fai for the Hong Kong Rifle Association.

Lo qualified as the lone female shooter for the Hong Kong squad in the 10 m air pistol at the 2004 Summer Olympics in Athens. She had been granted an Olympic invitation for her country by ISSF and IOC, having registered a minimum qualifying score of 374 at the ISSF World Cup meet in Changwon, South Korea a year earlier. Lo fired a substandard 371 out of a possible 400 to finish in a distant thirty-fourth from a field of forty-one shooters in the qualifying round, failing to advance further to the final.
