= Hiromi Misaki =

Japanese sports shooter

Personal information
- Full name: Hiromi Misaki
- Nationality: Japan
- Born: 13 August 1976 (age 49) Fukui, Japan
- Height: 1.59 m (5 ft 2 1/2 in)
- Weight: 61 kg (134 lb)

Sport
- Sport: Shooting
- Event(s): 10 m air rifle (AR40); 50 m rifle 3 positions (STR3X20)
- Club: Hitachi Team
- Coached by: Yoko Miki

Hiromi Misaki (三崎 宏美, Misaki Hiromi; born August 13, 1976 in Fukui) is a Japanese sport shooter. She has been selected to compete for Japan in rifle shooting at two Olympics (2000 and 2004), and has attained a total of five medals in a major international competition, spanning the ISSF World Cup series. Misaki trains full-time for Hitachi Shooting Team under her longtime coach Yoko Miki.

Misaki's Olympic debut came at the 2000 Summer Olympics in Sydney. There, she finished in a five-way tie for fifteenth position in the 10 m air rifle with a qualifying score of 392, just two points below the Olympic final cutoff. Misaki also competed in the 50 m rifle 3 positions, but slumped to a distant thirty-eighth in a 42-shooter field with 558 points, after she flubbed few shots in the kneeling series that contributed to her descent in the leaderboard.

At the 2004 Summer Olympics in Athens, Misaki qualified for her second Japanese team in rifle shooting. She managed to get a minimum qualifying standard of 397 to secure an Olympic berth for Japan in air rifle, following her top finish at the ISSF World Cup meet in Changwon, South Korea a year earlier. In the 10 m air rifle, held on the first day of the Games, Misaki fired a modest 392 out of a possible 400 to force in a massive draw with six others for twenty-second place. Nearly a week later, in the 50 m rifle 3 positions, Misaki marked a brilliant 195 in prone, 185 in standing, and 189 in the kneeling series to accumulate a total score of 569 points in the qualifying round, closing her out of the final to twenty-fourth place.
