= Lajos Pálinkás =

Hungarian sports shooter

Personal information
- Full name: Lajos Pálinkás
- Nationality: Hungary
- Born: 21 May 1964 (age 62) Zirc, Veszprém, Hungary
- Height: 1.78 m (5 ft 10 in)
- Weight: 90 kg (198 lb)

Sport
- Sport: Shooting
- Events: 10 m air pistol (AP60); 25 m rapid fire pistol (RFP)
- Club: Zámolyi Lövész Klub
- Coached by: Mihály Tesánszky
Medal record
Men's shooting
Representing Hungary
European Championships
| Bronze medal – third place | 1989 Zagreb | RFP |

Lajos Pálinkás (born 21 May 1964) is a Hungarian sport shooter. He has competed for Hungary in pistol shooting at four Olympics (1992 to 2004), and has been close to an Olympic medal in 1996 (finishing seventh in the rapid fire pistol). Outside the Olympic career, Palinkas has produced a career tally of four medals in a major international competition, a total of three (one gold and two bronze) at numerous meets of the ISSF World Cup series and a bronze under the senior category at the 1989 European Championships.

== Career ==
Having started the sport since the age of thirteen, Pálinkás has been training throughout his shooting career under coach Mihály Tesánszky for the national team at Zámolyi Shooting Range (Hungarian: Zámolyi Lövész Klub) on the outskirts of the nation's capital Budapest.

Pálinkás competed internationally for Hungary at the age of twenty-five, and simultaneously pocketed his first medal with a bronze in rapid fire shooting at the 1989 European Championships in Zagreb, Yugoslavia. Three years later, Pálinkás made his first Hungarian team at the 1992 Summer Olympics in Barcelona, finishing twenty-second in the rapid fire pistol with 579 points.

On his second Olympic appearance at Atlanta 1996, Pálinkás upgraded from his four-year fresh Olympic feat in Barcelona to successfully grab the eighth and last seed for his first Olympic final in the rapid fire pistol with a qualifying score of 586. Battling against the most experienced shooters in the finale, Pálinkás came up with a steady aim to shoot a substantial 99.9 for a seventh-place finish at 685.9, just five points away from the Olympic medal haul.

In 1999, Pálinkás reached the peak of his career on the international stage, as he claimed his first individual gold medal at the ISSF World Cup meet in Seoul, South Korea with 692.7 points. At the 2000 Summer Olympics in Sydney, Pálinkás extended his Olympic program to two events that he had never done before in his sporting career, competing in both air and rapid fire pistol shooting. In his first event, the 10 m air pistol, held on the first day of the Games, Pálinkás fired a score of 570 points to finish in a distant twenty-ninth place from a field of forty-three shooters. Five days later, on 21 September, Pálinkás sought to repeat his Olympic finale bid from Atlanta in the 25 m rapid fire pistol, but fell out of his contention to fourteenth with a qualifying score of 579, dropping five points from the final cutoff.

Three years later, Pálinkás bounced back from a disastrous Olympic feat in Sydney to nail the fourth position, his best career result after fourteen years, at the European Championships in Plzeň, Czech Republic with 687.8, just one point short of the bronze medal won by Germany's Klaus-Dieter Schmidt. Although he failed to medal, Pálinkás secured an Olympic quota place for Hungary on his fourth Games.

At the 2004 Summer Olympics in Athens, Pálinkás decided to drop the air pistol and instead focus on his specialty in the men's 25 m rapid fire pistol. He had registered a minimum qualifying score of 586 to compete as a 40-year-old veteran for his fourth Hungarian team, following a fourth-place finish at the European Championships a year earlier. Pálinkás got off to a bristling start with a perfect 100 on his initial try, until he aimed a rapid, four-second shot poorly at the very end of the first stage that saw him stumble down the leaderboard with a relatively low mark. He followed his miserable first day score of 287 with a much improved 290 on the remaining half of the competition, but his tally of 577 points was not enough to put him through to the final, forcing him in a two-way tie with Switzerland's Niki Marty for the twelfth position.

== Olympic results ==
| Event | 1992 | 1996 | 2000 | 2004 |
|---|---|---|---|---|
| 25 metre rapid fire pistol | 22nd 579 | 4th 586+99.9 | 14th 579 | 12th 577 |
| 10 metre air pistol | —N/a | | 29th 570 | —N/a |
