= Ann Spejlsgaard =

Danish sport shooter (born 1978)

Personal information
- Full name: Ann Spejlsgaard
- Nationality: Denmark
- Born: 21 March 1978 (age 48) Ringe, Faaborg-Midtfyn, Denmark
- Height: 1.62 m (5 ft 4 in)
- Weight: 60 kg (132 lb)

Sport
- Sport: Shooting
- Event: 10 m air rifle (AR40)
- Club: Vissenbjerg Shooting Club
- Coached by: Klaus Christensen (national)

Ann Spejlsgaard (born 21 March 1978) is a Danish sport shooter. She has been selected to compete for Denmark in air rifle shooting at the 2004 Summer Olympics, and has finished ninth twice in a major international competition, spanning the ISSF World Cup series and the World Championships. Spejlsgaard trains under head coach Klaus Christensen for the national team, while shooting in Vissenbjerg.

Spejlsgaard qualified for the Danish squad in the women's 10 m air rifle at the 2004 Summer Olympics in Athens. She managed to get a minimum qualifying score of 396 to secure an Olympic berth for Denmark in her pet event, after finishing outside the final in ninth place at the Worlds two years earlier in Lahti, Finland. Spejlsgaard shot a decent 388 out of a possible 400 to tie for thirty-third place with Belgium's Daisy de Bock, Egypt's Shaimaa Abdel-Latif, and host nation Greece's Maria Faka in the qualifying round, failing to advance further to the final.

Spejlsgaard currently resides in Aarhus with her husband and fellow Olympian Peter Thuesen, who competed in the men's air rifle shooting at the same Games.
