= Niki Marty =

Swiss sports shooter (born 1973)

Personal information
- Full name: Niki Marty
- Nationality: Switzerland
- Born: 13 October 1973 (age 52) Zürich, Switzerland
- Height: 1.78 m (5 ft 10 in)
- Weight: 85 kg (187 lb)

Sport
- Sport: Shooting
- Event: 25 m rapid fire pistol (RFP)
- Club: Schützengesellschaft Küsnacht
- Coached by: Krzysztof Kucharczyk
Medal record
Men's shooting
Representing Switzerland
World Championships
Bronze medal – third place	2002 Lahti	RFP

Niki Marty (born 13 October 1973 in Zürich) is a Swiss sport shooter. He won a bronze medal in rapid fire pistol shooting at the 2002 ISSF World Championships in Lahti, Finland, and was selected to compete for Switzerland at the 2004 Summer Olympics, finishing in twelfth place. Marty trains under Polish-born head coach and four-time Olympian Krzysztof Kucharczyk for the national team at Küsnacht Shooting Range (German: Schützengesellschaft Küsnacht) in his native Zürich.

Marty first came to prominence on the global scene at the 2002 ISSF World Championships in Lahti, Finland, where he claimed the bronze medal in rapid fire pistol shooting with 688.3, falling behind the German duo Marco Spangenberg and 1996 Olympic champion Ralf Schumann by a two-point gap.

At the 2004 Summer Olympics in Athens, Marty qualified for the Swiss squad in the men's 25 m rapid fire pistol. He had registered a minimum qualifying score of 588 to gain an Olympic quota place for Switzerland, following his third-place finish at the Worlds two years earlier. Marty fired a total score of 577 points to force a two-way tie with Hungary's four-time Olympian Lajos Pálinkás for twelfth place in the qualifying round, failing to advance to the final.
