= Dorottya Erdős =

Hungarian sport shooter

Personal information
- Full name: Dorottya Erdős
- Nationality: Hungary
- Born: 3 April 1979 (age 47) Budapest, Hungary
- Height: 1.64 m (5 ft 4 1/2 in)
- Weight: 59 kg (130 lb)

Sport
- Sport: Shooting
- Event(s): 10 m air pistol (AP40); 25 m pistol (SP)
- Club: Központi Sportiskola; Sportegyesület
- Coached by: Attila Győrik

Dorottya Erdős (born 3 April 1979) is a Hungarian sport shooter. She finished fifth in sport pistol shooting at the 2003 European Championships in Plzeň, Czech Republic, and was selected to represent Hungary at the 2004 Summer Olympics. Erdős also trains under her longtime coach Attila Győrik for Budapest's Central Sports School Association (Hungarian: Központi Sportiskola Sportegyesület).

Erdős qualified for the Hungarian squad in pistol shooting at the 2004 Summer Olympics in Athens. She managed to get a minimum qualifying score of 580 in the sport pistol to join with her fellow markswoman Zsófia Csonka and gain an Olympic quota place for Hungary, following her fifth-place finish at the European Championships a year earlier. In the 10 m air pistol, held on the third day of the Games, Erdős fired a frustrating 379 out of a possible 400 to share a twenty-first place with three other shooters. In her signature event, the 25 m pistol, Erdős ended up in an unfortunate aim throughout the competition, as she shot a lowly 278 in the precision stage and 279 in the rapid fire for a total score of 557 points, slipping down to thirty-fourth in a two-way tie with Switzerland's Cornelia Frölich.
