= Ahn Soo-kyeong =

South Korean sport shooter

Personal information
- Nationality: South Korea
- Born: 9 January 1987 (age 39) Jeju City, South Korea
- Height: 1.60 m (5 ft 3 in)
- Weight: 65 kg (143 lb)

Korean name
- Hangul: 안수경
- RR: An Sugyeong
- MR: An Sugyŏng

Sport
- Sport: Shooting
- Event(s): 10 m air pistol (AP40); 25 m pistol (SP)
- Coached by: Kim Soon Pal

Ahn Soo-kyeong (Korean: 안수경; born January 9, 1987, in Jeju City) is a South Korean sport shooter. She won a gold medal in the women's air pistol at the 2003 ISSF World Cup in Fort Benning, Georgia, United States, accumulating a score of 485.2 points.

At age seventeen, Ahn made her official debut for the 2004 Summer Olympics in Athens, where she competed in two pistol shooting events. She placed tenth out of forty-one shooters in the women's 10 m air pistol, with a score of 382 points. Three days later, Ahn competed for her second event, 25 m pistol, where she was able to shoot 286 targets in the precision stage, and 291 in the rapid fire, for a total score of 577 points, finishing only in thirteenth place.

At the 2008 Summer Olympics in Beijing, Ahn qualified for the second time in the women's 25 m pistol, along with her teammate Lee Ho-Lim. She finished only in eleventh place by one point behind Japan's Michiko Fukushima from the final attempt, for a total score of 581 points (288 in the precision stage and 293 in the rapid fire).
