= Chang Yi-ning =

Taiwanese sports shooter

Personal information
- Full name: Chang Yi-ning
- Nationality: Chinese Taipei
- Born: 13 November 1957 (age 68) Taipei, Taiwan
- Height: 1.80 m (5 ft 11 in)
- Weight: 76 kg (168 lb)

Sport
- Sport: Shooting
- Event(s): 10 m air pistol (AP60); 50 m pistol (FP)

Chang Yi-ning (Chinese: 張 憶寧; pinyin: Zhāng Yìníng; born November 13, 1957, in Taipei) is a Taiwanese sport shooter. He has been selected to compete for Chinese Taipei in pistol shooting at the 2004 Summer Olympics, and has attained a top seven finish in free pistol at the 2002 ISSF World Championships.

Chang qualified for the Chinese Taipei squad, as a lone male athlete, in pistol shooting at the 2004 Summer Olympics in Athens. He managed to get a minimum qualifying score of 581 to gain an Olympic quota place for Chinese Taipei in the free pistol, following his outstanding eighth-place finish at the Worlds two years earlier. Chang got off to a disastrous start by shooting a hapless 569 out of a possible 600 in the 10 m air pistol, slipping further off to fortieth from a field of forty-seven shooters. Three days later, in the 50 m pistol, Chang continued his Olympic flop from a bitter air pistol defeat to launch a dismal 548 in the qualifying round, forcing him in a thirtieth-place tie with 52-year-old Argentine shooter Maximo Modesti.
