= Kim Frazer =

Australian sport shooter (born 1959)

Personal information
- Full name: Kim Frazer
- Nationality: Australia
- Born: 16 April 1959 (age 67) Melbourne, Australia
- Height: 1.67 m (5 ft 5 1/2 in)
- Weight: 52 kg (115 lb)

Sport
- Sport: Shooting
- Events: 10 m air rifle (AR40); 50 m rifle prone (STR60PR); 50 m rifle 3 positions (STR3X20)
- Club: Melbourne International Shooting; Club
- Coached by: John Dismore; Miroslav Šipek (national)
Medal record
Women's shooting
Representing Australia
Commonwealth Games
Gold medal – first place	1994 Victoria BC	50m Rifle Prone - Pair
Gold medal – first place	1998 Kuala Lumpur	50m Rifle Prone - Pair
Gold medal – first place	2002 Manchester	50m Rifle Prone

Kim Frazer (born 16 April 1959, in Melbourne) is an Australian sport shooter. She has been selected to compete for Australia in small-bore rifle shooting at the 2004 Summer Olympics, and has yielded a tally of ten medals in a major international competition, spanning the Oceanian Championships and four editions of the Commonwealth Games (1994 to 2006). Before her retirement in 2006, Frazer also became a full-fledged member of Melbourne International Shooting Club, where she trained under the tutelage of John Dismore.

Frazer began shooting at the age of eighteen with the Melbourne University Rifle Club, but achieved prominence internationally in 1994 and 1998, when she finished sixth each in the individual rifle prone, and then shared gold medals with Sylvia Purdie and Carrie Quigley respectively in the pairs at the Commonwealth Games.

On her third attempt at Manchester 2002, Frazer shot a brilliant 588 to successfully capture her first individual Commonwealth Games gold in the rifle prone on a countback from South Africa's Esmari van Reenen.

At the 2004 Summer Olympics in Athens, Frazer qualified for her first ever Australian team, as a 45-year-old, in the 50 m rifle 3 positions. She managed to beat Robyn van Nus at the Olympic trials in Sydney to snatch one of Olympic berths that her teammate had claimed from the Oceanian Championships a year earlier. A less experienced to the sporting event, Frazer put up a lackluster feat by marking 192 in prone, a modest 175 in standing, and 184 in the kneeling series to accumulate a total score of 555 points in the qualifying round, closing her out of the final to round off the 33-shooter field with Macedonia's Divna Pešić in a two-way draw.

When her native Melbourne hosted the 2006 Commonwealth Games, Frazer and her partner Susannah Smith slipped out of the podium to fourth in the rifle prone pairs at 1160 points, just a single target behind second runner-up New Zealand. Since retiring from the competition shortly after her fourth Commonwealth Games, Frazer has continued her involvement with shooting both as a coach and an administrator.

After retiring from shooting, Frazer took up Contract Bridge in 2005 and in 2018 made the Australian women's team. In 2019 she published Gaining the Mental Edge at Bridge, discussing the application of sports psychology to bridge, which won the International Bridge Press Association's "Book of the Year" award in 2020.
