= Lenka Marušková =

Czech sport shooter (born 1985)

Personal information
- Nationality: Czech Republic
- Born: Lenka Hyková; 2 February 1985 (age 41) Plzeň, Czechoslovakia
- Website: lenkamaruskova.cz

Sport
- Sport: Shooting
- Event(s): AP40, SP
- Club: Dukla Plzeň
Medal record
Olympic Games
Silver medal – second place	2004	25 metre pistol
World Championships
Bronze medal – third place	2010	25 metre pistol
Bronze medal – third place	2010	25 metre pistol team

Lenka Marušková (Czech pronunciation: [ˈlɛŋka ˈmaruʃkovaː]) née Hyková [ˈɦɪkovaː] (born 2 February 1985) is a Czech retired sport shooter.

At the 2004 Summer Olympics, she won a silver medal in the women's 25 metre pistol, and also competed in the 10 metre air pistol. She also competed in the same two events at the 2008 and 2012 Summer Olympics.

Her father, Vladimír, was also an Olympic-level sport shooter.

Awards
Preceded by Zuzana Kocumová	Czech Junior Athlete of the Year; 2004	Succeeded by Šárka Strachová
