= Francis Gorrín =

Venezuelan sport shooter (born 1983)

Personal information
- Full name: Francis Gorrín
- Nationality: Venezuela
- Born: 12 September 1983 (age 42) Valencia, Carabobo, Venezuela
- Height: 1.62 m (5 ft 4 in)
- Weight: 54 kg (119 lb)

Sport
- Sport: Shooting
- Event(s): 10 m air pistol (AP40); 25 m pistol (SP)
Medal record
Women's shooting
Representing Venezuela
Pan American Games
Gold medal – first place	2003 Santo Domingo	AP40

Francis Gorrín (born September 12, 1983 in Valencia, Carabobo) is a Venezuelan sport shooter. She claimed the gold medal in the air pistol at the 2003 Pan American Games in Santo Domingo, Dominican Republic, and was selected to compete for Venezuela at the 2004 Summer Olympics.

== Career ==
Gorrín first established herself on the world scene, as a 19-year-old, at the 2003 Pan American Games in Santo Domingo, Dominican Republic, where she scored a total of 477.1 points to defeat Colombia's Amanda Mondol by a three-point gap for the gold medal in the air pistol. With her historic victory, Gorrín grabbed one of the Olympic slots to ensure her place on the Venezuelan shooting team for the Games.

At the 2004 Summer Olympics in Athens, Gorrín qualified for the Venezuelan squad in pistol shooting, by having attained a mandatory Olympic standard of 379 and claiming the gold medal in air pistol from the Pan American Games. Gorrín started off her Olympic run poorly, as she rounded out the field of 41 shooters with a score of 358 points in the 10 m air pistol prelims. On her second event, 25 m pistol, Gorrín registered 271 points in three precision series and 263 in the rapid fire stage to accumulate an overall record of 534 points, but maintained her position from the previous event with the lowest score.
