= Matej Mészáros =

Slovak sports shooter

Personal information
- Full name: Matej Mészáros
- Nationality: Slovakia
- Born: 26 April 1982 (age 44) Bratislava, Czechoslovakia
- Height: 1.73 m (5 ft 8 in)
- Weight: 75 kg (165 lb)

Sport
- Sport: Shooting
- Event: 10 m air rifle (AR40)
- Club: SSSR MV SR Bratislava
- Coached by: František Fesco

Matej Mészáros (born 26 April 1982 in Bratislava) is a Slovak sport shooter. He was selected to compete for the Slovak team at the 2004 Summer Olympics, finishing ninth in air rifle. Having started the sport since the age of eight, Meszaros trained as a member of the shooting team for the Slovak Republic State Sport Representation Centre of Interior Ministry (Slovak: Stredisko štátnej športovej reprezentácie MV SR) in his native Bratislava under personal coach František Fesco.

Meszaros qualified for the Slovak squad in the men's 10 m air rifle at the 2004 Summer Olympics in Athens, by having attained a minimum qualifying score of 595 and finishing sixth to secure one of the Olympic slots available from the European Championships in Gothenburg, Sweden. Meszaros shot 594 out of 600 points to finish in a seventh-place tie with four other shooters in the qualifying stage, but fell abruptly in a shoot-off for the final round by 100 to 98, dropping him to ninth.
