= Amr El-Gaiar =

Egyptian sport shooter

Personal information
- Full name: Amr El-Gaiar
- Nationality: Egyptian
- Born: 19 February 1974 (age 52) Cairo, Egypt
- Height: 1.70 m (5 ft 7 in)
- Weight: 73 kg (161 lb)

Sport
- Sport: Shooting
- Event: Skeet (SK125)
- Club: Doki Shooting Club
- Coached by: Mohamed Khorshed

Amr El-Gaiar (Arabic: عمرو الجيار; born 19 February 1974 in Cairo) is an Egyptian sport shooter. He was selected to compete for Egypt at the 2004 Summer Olympics, and also won a gold medal in skeet shooting at the 2003 African Championships in Pretoria, South Africa. A full-fledged member of the Egyptian Shooting Federation, El-Gaiar trains under national head coach and five-time Olympian Mohamed Khorshed at Doki Shooting Club in his native Cairo.

El-Gaiar qualified for the Egyptian team in the men's skeet at the 2004 Summer Olympics in Athens. He had registered a minimum qualifying score of 117 to join with his fellow shooter and then incoming three-time Olympian Mostafa Hamdy, and fill in the second Olympic quota for Egypt from his successful top finish at the African Championships less than a year earlier. Al-Gaiar shot 115 targets out of a possible 125 in the qualifying round to force a three-way tie with Great Britain's Richard Brickell and the Netherlands' Jan-Cor van der Greef for thirty-fourth place from an immense field of forty-one shooters.
