= Peter Thuesen (sport shooter) =

Danish sports shooter

Personal information
- Full name: Peter Thuesen
- Nationality: Denmark
- Born: 2 November 1978 (age 47) Holstebro, Denmark
- Height: 1.75 m (5 ft 9 in)
- Weight: 60 kg (132 lb)

Sport
- Sport: Shooting
- Event: 10 m air rifle (AR60)
- Club: Akademisk Skytteforening
- Coached by: Klaus Christensen

Peter Thuesen (born 2 November 1978) is a Danish sport shooter. He has been selected to compete for Denmark in air rifle shooting at the 2004 Summer Olympics, and has won two medals, gold and silver, in a major international competition, spanning the European Championships and the ISSF World Cup series. Thuesen trains under head coach Klaus Christensen for the national team at a rifle shooting academy in Aarhus (Danish: Akademisk Skytteforening).

Thuesen qualified for the Danish team in the men's 10 m air rifle at the 2004 Summer Olympics in Athens. He managed to get a minimum qualifying score of 596 to secure an Olympic berth for Denmark, after claiming the gold medal in his pet event at the 2002 ISSF World Cup meet in Milan, Italy two years earlier. Thuesen shot a steady 589 out of a possible 600 to tie for twenty-ninth position with neighboring Sweden's Sven Haglund, Russia's Konstantin Prikhodtchenko, and Slovenia's 2000 Olympic gold medalist Rajmond Debevec in the qualifying round, failing to advance to the final.

Thuesen currently resides in Aarhus with his wife and fellow Olympian Ann Spejlsgaard, who also competed in the women's air rifle shooting at the same Games.
