= Irada Ashumova =

Azerbaijani sport shooter

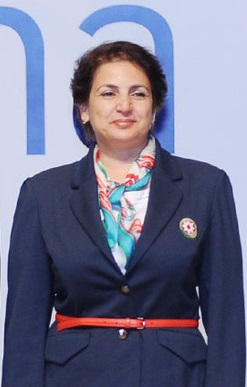

Personal information
- Born: 25 February 1958 (age 68) Baku, Azerbaijan SSR, Soviet Union
Medal record
Women's shooting
Representing Azerbaijan
Olympic Games
Bronze medal – third place	2004 Athens	25 m Pistol
World Championships
Silver medal – second place	1998 Barcelona	25 m Pistol
Silver medal – second place	2002 Lahti	25 m Pistol
Representing Soviet Union
World Championships
Silver medal – second place	1985 Mexico	10 m air pistol

Irada Suleyman qizi Ashumova (born 25 February 1958 in Baku, Azerbaijan SSR) is an Azerbaijani sport shooter. She was the first woman to represent Azerbaijan at the Olympics.

She competed in the 25 m Pistol competition at both the 2004 Summer Olympics and the 2002 World Championships, winning a bronze medal and a silver medal, respectively.

In the 2004 Olympics she also competed in 10 m Air Pistol without winning anything. However, she was part of the Soviet national team that set a team world record of 1152 in this discipline in 1985.

She competed in the 2012 Olympics.

Ashumova is a teacher at the Azerbaijan Institute of Physical Culture in Baku. She has been a scholarship holder with the Olympic Solidarity program since November 2002. She is married to sport shooting coach Vladimir Lunev. Their son Ruslan Lunev has represented Azerbaijan in sports shooting at the 2016, 2020 and 2024 Summer Olympics.

Olympic results
Event	1996	2000	2004	2012
25 metre pistol	15th 576	31st 569	(bronze) Bronze; 588+99.3	23rd 578
10 metre air pistol	10th 381	45th 229 (DNF)	8th 386+95.4	39th 372
