= Attila Simon (sport shooter) =

Hungarian sport shooter

Personal information
- Full name: Attila Simon
- Nationality: Hungary
- Born: 1 June 1970 (age 56) Budapest, Hungary
- Height: 1.78 m (5 ft 10 in)
- Weight: 69 kg (152 lb)

Sport
- Sport: Shooting
- Event(s): 10 m air pistol (AP60); 50 m pistol (FP)
- Club: Budapest Honvéd SE
- Coached by: Mihály Tesánszky

Attila Simon (born 1 June 1970) is a Hungarian sport shooter. He has competed for Hungary in pistol shooting at the 2004 Summer Olympics, and has attained a top seven finish in a major international competition, spanning the 2003 European Championships. Simon also trains under head coach Mihály Tesánszky for ten years as a member of the Hungarian shooting team at Budapest Honvéd SE.

Simon qualified for the Hungarian squad in pistol shooting at the 2004 Summer Olympics in Athens. He managed to get a minimum qualifying score of 555 to gain an Olympic quota place for Hungary in the free pistol, following his outstanding seventh-place finish at the European Championships in Plzeň, Czech Republic one year earlier. Simon got off to a shaky start on the first day of the Games by placing further down at a distant forty-third in the 10 m air pistol with a total of 562, just seven points better than his entry standard. Three days later, in the 50 m pistol, Simon continued his unsteady Olympic feat with a qualifying score of 536 to end up in thirty-sixth out of forty-two shooters, failing to advance to the final.
