= Marcus Åkerholm =

Swedish sports shooter

Personal information
- Full name: Marcus Ricard Åkerholm
- Nationality: Sweden
- Born: 29 February 1976 (age 50) Flen, Uppsala, Sweden
- Height: 1.79 m (5 ft 10 1/2 in)
- Weight: 86 kg (190 lb)

Sport
- Sport: Shooting
- Event: 10 m air rifle (AR60)
- Club: Uppsala Skyttegille
- Coached by: Stefan Lindblom

Marcus Ricard Åkerholm (born 29 February 1976 in Flen, Uppsala) is a Swedish sport shooter. He has been selected to compete for Sweden in air rifle shooting at the 2004 Summer Olympics, and has attained numerous top ten finishes in a major international competition, spanning the World and European Championships and the ISSF World Cup series. Åkerholm trains under head coach Stefan Lindblom for the national team, while shooting at a rifle gun range in Uppsala (Swedish: Uppsala Skyttegille).

Åkerholm qualified for the Swedish team in the men's 10 m air rifle at the 2004 Summer Olympics in Athens. He managed to get a minimum qualifying score of 594 to gain an Olympic quota place and join with fellow marksman Sven Haglund for Sweden, following his outside-final finish at the Worlds two years earlier. Åkerholm shot a steady 588 out of a possible 600 to tie for thirty-third position with Kyrgyzstan's Aleksandr Babchenko in the qualifying round, failing to reach the Olympic final and trailing Haglund throughout the phase by just a single point.
