= Custódio Ezequiel =

Portuguese sports shooter (born 1962)

Personal information
- Full name: Custódio Ribeiro Ezequiel
- Nationality: Portugal
- Born: 28 March 1962 (age 64) Alcochete, Portugal
- Height: 1.71 m (5 ft 7 1/2 in)
- Weight: 80 kg (176 lb)

Sport
- Sport: Shooting
- Event: Trap (TR125)
- Club: Clube de Tiro de Vilamoura

Custódio Ribeiro Ezequiel (born 28 March 1962 in Alcochete) is a Portuguese sport shooter. He was selected to compete for Portugal in two editions of the Olympic Games (2000 and 2004), and also produced a career tally of three medals, two golds and one bronze, at the ISSF World Cup series. Ezequiel is a member of Vilamoura Shooting Club (Portuguese: Clube de Tiro de Vilamoura).

Ezequiel's Olympic debut came at the 2000 Summer Olympics in Sydney, where he marked 111 out of 125 targets to force a four-way tie with Italy's Rodolfo Vigano, Ireland's Derek Burnett, and United Arab Emirates' Ahmed Al Maktoum for eighteenth place in the men's trap.

At the 2004 Summer Olympics in Athens, Ezequiel qualified for his second Portuguese team in trap shooting, after having achieved a minimum qualifying score of 123 from his remarkable top finish at the ISSF World Cup meet in Granada, Spain a year earlier. Ezequiel fell out of his previous Olympic feat to finish in a four-way tie with Turkey's Oğuzhan Tüzün, India's Mansher Singh, and Singapore's Lee Wung Yew for twenty-first position, firing a matching score of 111.
