= Michael Nielsen (sport shooter) =

Danish sport shooter (born 1975)

Personal information
- Full name: Michael Nielsen
- Nationality: Denmark
- Born: 3 August 1975 (age 50) Roskilde, Denmark
- Height: 1.74 m (5 ft 8 1/2 in)
- Weight: 86 kg (190 lb)

Sport
- Sport: Shooting
- Event: Skeet (SK125)
- Club: SK København
- Coached by: Kjild Fristrup
Medal record
Men's shooting
Representing Denmark
European Championships
Silver medal – second place	2003 Brno	SK125

Michael Nielsen (born 3 August 1975) is a Danish sport shooter. He won a silver medal in skeet shooting at the 2003 European Championships in Brno, Czech Republic, and eventually finished seventh at the 2004 Summer Olympics, competing for the Danish team. Nielsen trains under longtime coach Kjild Fristrup as a member of the shooting team at SK København.

Nielsen qualified for the Danish team in the men's skeet at the 2004 Summer Olympics in Athens. He had eclipsed a minimum qualifying score of 124 to strike a silver-medal finish and to grab one of the Olympic quota places available at the European Championships less than a year earlier. Clearly one of the top favorites vying for an Olympic medal, Nielsen nailed 122 targets out of a possible 125 to force a third-place tie with four other shooters in the qualifying round, but fell abruptly in a tight duel to neighboring Norway's Harald Jensen 2 to 1, who coveted the last seed for the six-man Olympic final, relegating him to seventh.

Nielsen is also married to pistol shooter and three-time Olympian Susanne Meyerhoff.
