= Shuji Tazawa =

Japanese sport shooter

Medal record

Men's shooting

Representing Japan

Asian Championships
| Bronze medal – third place | 2007 Kuwait City | 25 m rapid fire pistol team |
| Bronze medal – third place | 2007 Kuwait City | 25 m standard pistol team |

Shuji Tazawa (田澤 修治, Tazawa Shūji; born 29 April 1968) is a Japanese sport shooter who competed in the 2004 Summer Olympics.
