= Cao Ying (sport shooter) =

Chinese sports shooter (born 1974)

Cao Ying (Chinese: 曹英; born November 23, 1974, in Changsha, Hunan) is a Chinese sports shooter. She competed in the 2000 Summer Olympics and in the 2004 Summer Olympics.

Olympic results
Event	2000	2004
25 metre pistol	20th 575	10th 578
