= Jan-Cor van der Greef =

Dutch sport shooter

Personal information
- Full name: Cornelis Huig Jan van der Greef
- Born: 6 April 1983 (age 43) Vianen, Netherlands
- Height: 1.90 m (6 ft 3 in)
- Weight: 85 kg (187 lb)

Sport
- Country: Netherlands
- Sport: Shooting
- Event: Skeet (SK125)
- Club: Schietvereniging de Snip
- Coached by: Nella Heemskerk

Cornelis Huig Jan "Jan-Cor" van der Greef (born 6 April 1983 in Vianen) is a Dutch sport shooter. He has competed for the Netherlands at the 2004 Summer Olympics, and also established a junior world record for a fifth-place finish at the 2003 European Championships in Brno, Czech Republic. Van der Greef is a member of Snip Shooting Club (Dutch: Schietvereniging de Snip) and a resident athlete of the Royal Netherlands Shooting Federation (Dutch: Koninklijke Nederlandse Schietsport Associatie, KNSA), where he trains under head coach Nelia Heemskerk.

Van der Greef qualified for the Dutch shooting team, as a 21-year-old, in the men's skeet at the 2004 Summer Olympics in Athens. He had registered a minimum qualifying score of 123 to join with his fellow shooter and then incoming five-time Olympian Hennie Dompeling, and fill in the second Olympic quota for the Netherlands from his fiery fifth-place finish at the European Championships a year earlier. A newcomer to the international competition, Van der Greef shot 115 targets out of a possible 125 in the qualifying round to force a three-way tie with Great Britain's Richard Brickell and Egypt's Amr El-Gaiar for thirty-fourth place from an immense field of forty-one shooters.
