= Sarah Blakeslee =

American sport shooter

Personal information
- Full name: Sarah Christine Blakeslee
- Nationality: United States
- Born: 16 May 1985 (age 41) Vancouver, Washington, United; States
- Height: 1.70 m (5 ft 7 in)
- Weight: 56 kg (123 lb)

Sport
- Sport: Shooting
- Event(s): 10 m air rifle (AR40); 50 m rifle 3 positions (STR3X20)
- Coached by: David Johnson (national)
Medal record
Women's shooting
Representing the United States
Pan American Games
Silver medal – second place	2003 Santo Domingo	STR3X20

Sarah Christine Blakeslee (born May 16, 1985, in Vancouver, Washington) is an American sport shooter. She won a silver medal in small-bore rifle three positions at the 2003 Pan American Games in Santo Domingo, Dominican Republic, and was selected to compete for Team USA, as a 19-year-old at the 2004 Summer Olympics. A former resident athlete of the U.S. Olympic Training Center in Colorado Springs, Colorado, Blakeslee trained rigorously for the national rifle shooting team under the tutelage of David Johnson.

Blakeslee's sporting debut in the worldwide scene came as an eighteen-year-old teen at the 2003 Pan American Games in Santo Domingo, Dominican Republic. There, she nailed down the silver in the rifle three positions at 668.2, losing the title to Cuba's Eglis Yaima Cruz by a slim 0.3-point deficit. With a noteworthy runner-up finish and a specific qualifying standard required in the selection, Blakeslee secured an Olympic berth for Team USA on her first Games.

At the 2004 Summer Olympics in Athens, Blakeslee qualified for the U.S. shooting team in the 50 m rifle 3 positions, after finishing ahead of her teammate Morgan Hicks for first place at the Olympic trials in Fort Benning, Georgia four months earlier. A less experienced to the international scene, Blakeslee marked a brilliant 197 in prone, 185 in standing, and 189 in the kneeling series to put up a much steadfast aim in a three-way tie with Cruz and Finland's Marjo Yli-Kiikka for twentieth place. Blakeslee's qualifying score of 571 was just eight points short of the final cutoff and six away from her Hicks, who placed twelfth.
