= Alyona Aksyonova =

Uzbek sport shooter (born 1979)

Personal information
- Full name: Alyona Aksyonova
- Nationality: Uzbekistan
- Born: 13 November 1979 (age 46) Andijan, Uzbek SSR, Soviet Union
- Height: 1.72 m (5 ft 7 1/2 in)
- Weight: 52 kg (115 lb)

Sport
- Sport: Shooting
- Events: 10 m air rifle (AR40); 50 m rifle prone (STR60PR); 50 m rifle 3 positions (STR3X20)
Medal record
Women's shooting
Representing Uzbekistan
Asian Championships
Bronze medal – third place	2000 Langkawi	STR60PR

Alyona Aksyonova (Russian: Алёна Аксёнова; born 13 November 1979 in Andijan) is an Uzbek sport shooter. She won a bronze medal in small-bore rifle prone at the 2000 Asian Championships in Langkawi, Malaysia, and was selected to compete for Uzbekistan in two editions of the Olympic Games (2000 and 2004).

Akysonova's Olympic debut came as a 21-year-old at the 2000 Summer Olympics in Sydney. There, she finished in a massive eight-way tie for twentieth place in the 10 m air rifle with a qualifying score of 391, just three points below the Olympic final cutoff. Akysonova also competed in the 50 m rifle 3 positions, but plummeted to a thirtieth-place tie with Cuba's Eunice Caballero and fellow markswoman Yuliya Shakhova at 567 points (194 in prone, 185 in standing, and 188 in the kneeling series) in the prelims.

At the 2004 Summer Olympics in Athens, Aksyonova qualified as a lone markswoman for her second Uzbek team in rifle shooting. She managed to get a minimum qualifying standard of a near-perfect 399 to secure an Olympic berth for Uzbekistan in air rifle, following her seventh-place finish at the Asian Championships in Kuala Lumpur, Malaysia few months earlier. In the 10 m air rifle, held on the first day of the Games, Akysonova fired an ill-fated 384 out of a possible 400 to finish in a distant fortieth out of forty-four shooters. Nearly a week later, in the 50 m rifle 3 positions, Aksyonova marked 193 in prone, a substandard 175 in standing, and 190 in the kneeling series to accumulate a total score of 562 points in the qualifying round, closing her out of the final to twenty-ninth place.
