= Isidro Lorenzo =

Spanish sports shooter (born 1958)

Personal information
- Full name: Isidro Lorenzo González
- Nationality: Spain
- Born: 8 March 1958 (age 68) Villadepera, Zamora, Spain
- Height: 1.73 m (5 ft 8 in)
- Weight: 87 kg (192 lb)

Sport
- Sport: Shooting
- Events: 10 m air pistol (AP60); 50 m pistol (FP)
- Club: Club Zamorano de Tiro
- Coached by: Cezary Staniszewski

Isidro Lorenzo González (Note: In this Spanish name, the first or paternal surname is Lorenzo and the second or maternal family name is González.) (born 8 March 1958 in Villadepera, Zamora) is a Spanish sport shooter. He was selected to compete for Spain as a 46-year-old at the 2004 Summer Olympics, and eventually won a bronze medal in free pistol shooting at the 2006 ISSF World Cup meet in Guangzhou, China. Lorenzo also trains under head coach Cezary Staniszewski for twelve years as a full-fledged member of the Spanish pistol shooting team.

Lorenzo qualified for the Spanish team, as one of the oldest athletes (aged 46), in pistol shooting at the 2004 Summer Olympics in Athens. He managed to get a minimum qualifying score of 560 to gain an Olympic quota place for Spain in the free pistol, following his outside-final finish at the ISSF World Cup meet in Zagreb, Croatia one year earlier. Lorenzo got off to a shaky start on the first day of the Games by placing further down at a distant forty-second in the 10 m air pistol with a total of 565, bettering just five points from his entry standard. Three days after an unsteady air pistol feat, Lorenzo nailed a fantastic, fifth-seeded score at 562 to reach the eight-man final in the 50 m pistol, before eventually dropping to last with the lowest score of the field at 90.0 for a total of 652.0 points.
