= Dionysios Georgakopoulos =

Greek sport shooter

Personal information
- Full name: Dionysios Georgakopoulos
- Nationality: Greece
- Born: 16 April 1963 (age 63) Athens, Greece
- Height: 1.74 m (5 ft 8 1/2 in)
- Weight: 70 kg (154 lb)

Sport
- Sport: Shooting
- Events: 10 m air pistol (AP60); 50 m pistol (FP)
- Club: Ethnikos G.S.

Dionysios Georgakopoulos (Greek: Διονύσιος Γεωργακόπουλος; born 16 April 1963 in Athens) is a Greek sport shooter. He has been selected to compete for Greece in two editions of the Olympic Games (2000 and 2004), and has won a total of two medals, a gold and a silver, in pistol shooting at a major international competition, spanning the 2001 and 2003 ISSF World Cup series. Georgakopoulos is also a member of the shooting team at Ethnikos Gymnastikos Syllogos (English: Ethnikos Sports Gym) in his native Athens.

Georgakopoulos' Olympic debut came as a 37-year-old at the 2000 Summer Olympics in Sydney, where he finished seventeenth in the air pistol, and sixteenth in the free pistol, producing aggregate scores of 576 and 557 respectively.

At the 2004 Summer Olympics in Athens, Georgakopoulos was named as part of the host nation's shooting team on his second consecutive Games, competing in both air and free pistol. Although Greece had reserved a place in air pistol shooting, he got a minimum qualifying score of 556 to fill in the quota from his runner-up finish at the 2003 ISSF World Cup meet in Changwon, South Korea. In his first event, the 10 m air pistol, Georgakopoulos fired a score of 572 to force a three-way tie with Spain's José Antonio Colado and Namibia's Friedhelm Sack for a distant thirty-third position, just four points away from his 2000 Olympic feat. Three days later, in the 50 m pistol, Georgakopoulos shot a lowly 549 in the prelims to notch a twenty-eighth place draw with Thailand's Jakkrit Panichpatikum, ruling out of his contention for an Olympic final in front of the home crowd.
