= Chris Rice (sport shooter) =

American sports shooter

Personal information
- Full name: Christopher Rice
- Nationality: United States Virgin Islands
- Born: December 26, 1959 (age 66) Saint Thomas, Virgin Islands
- Height: 1.76 m (5 ft 9 1/2 in)
- Weight: 75 kg (165 lb)

Sport
- Sport: Shooting
- Events: 10 m air pistol (AP60); 50 m pistol (FP)
- Club: Virgin Island Shooting; Federation
- Coached by: Will Henderson

Christopher Rice (born December 26, 1959, in Saint Thomas) is a sport shooter from the United States Virgin Islands. He has been selected to compete for the Virgin Islands as a lone pistol shooter in two editions of the Olympic Games (2000 and 2004), and has won a bronze medal in free pistol at the 2001 American Continental Championships in Fort Benning, Georgia, United States. Rice also trains under head coach Will Henderson for the Virgin Island Shooting Federation.

Rice's Olympic debut came at the 2000 Summer Olympics in Sydney, where he finished thirty-ninth in the air pistol, and twenty-seventh in the free pistol, producing aggregate scores of 560 and 548 respectively.

At the 2004 Summer Olympics in Athens, Rice qualified for his second Virgin Islands team in both air and free pistol. He had granted a tripartite invitation in the air pistol from ISSF, after having recorded a personal best of 569 out of a possible 600 to finish tenth at the Pan American Games in Santo Domingo, Dominican Republic one year earlier. In his first event, the 10 m air pistol, Rice fired a score of 560 to finish in a distant forty-sixth position from an enormous field of forty-seven shooters, just nine points short of his personal best. Three days later, in the 50 m pistol, Rice registered the lowest score of the meet at 529 points to round out the field with Namibia's Friedhelm Sack for forty-first place.
