= Chen Muhua (sport shooter) =

Chinese sport shooter

Chen Muhua (Chinese: 陳慕華; born 4 December 1973) is a Chinese sport shooter who competed in the 1996 Summer Olympics.
