= Abdulla Ustaoglu =

German sports shooter (born 1970)

Abdulla Ustaoglu (born 20 April 1970) is a German sport shooter who competed in the 2004 Summer Olympics.
