= Li Jie (running target shooter) =

Chinese sports shooter

Personal information
- Born: February 3, 1973 (age 53) Jinhua, Zhejiang, China
- Height: 177 cm (5 ft 10 in)
- Weight: 80 kg (176 lb)

Li Jie (simplified Chinese: 李杰; traditional Chinese: 李傑; pinyin: Lǐ Jié; born February 3, 1973, in Jinhua, Zhejiang) is a male Chinese sports shooter who competed in the 2004 Summer Olympics.

He competed in the men's 10 metre running target event and finished sixth.

Currently, he is based in Singapore as a shooting coach, for Raffles Institution and Raffles Girls School.

As of 2023, he make a return, and he is representing Singapore in the Hangzhou 2022 Asian Games in the 10m Men's Running Target Event.
