= Torsten Krebs =

German sport shooter

Torsten Krebs (born 6 April 1973) is a German sport shooter who competed in the 2004 Summer Olympics.
