= Krzysztof Kucharczyk =

Polish sports shooter (born 1957)

Krzysztof Kucharczyk (born 7 May 1957 in Wrocław) is a Polish former sport shooter who competed in the 1988 Summer Olympics, in the 1992 Summer Olympics, in the 1996 Summer Olympics, and in the 2000 Summer Olympics.
