= Valentina Turisini =

Italian sport shooter

Personal information
- Born: 16 August 1969 (age 56)
Medal record
Women's Shooting
Silver medal – second place	2004 Athens	Small-bore Rifle, 3 Positions

Valentina Turisini (born 16 August 1969) is an Italian sport shooter and Olympic champion. She received a silver medal at the 2004 Summer Olympics in Athens.
