= Park Ah-young =

South Korean sport shooter (born 1984)

Park Ah-young (born 7 February 1984) is a South Korean sport shooter who competed in the 2004 Summer Olympics.
