= Paul Rahman =

Australian sport shooter (born 1984)

Paul Nicholas Rahman (born 9 September 1984 in Melbourne, Victoria, Australia) is a sport shooter who has twice represented Australia at the Summer Olympics.

At the 2004 Summer Olympics in Athens he participated in the men's skeet event, finishing tied for 15th position. At the 2008 Games in Beijing he finished 30th in the men's skeet.
