= Maximo Modesti =

Argentine sports shooter (born 1952)

Personal information
- Full name: Maximo Tomás Modesti
- Nationality: Argentina
- Born: 13 February 1952 (age 74) Villa María, Córdoba, Argentina
- Height: 1.72 m (5 ft 7 1/2 in)
- Weight: 83 kg (183 lb)

Sport
- Sport: Shooting
- Event(s): 10 m air pistol (AP60); 50 m pistol (FP)
- Club: Tiro Federal de Rio
- Coached by: Juan Carlos Sampayo
Medal record
Men's shooting
Representing Argentina
Pan American Games
Silver medal – second place	2003 Santo Domingo	AP60

Maximo Tomás Modesti (born February 13, 1952, in Villa María, Córdoba) is an Argentine sport shooter. He won a silver medal in the men's air pistol at the 2003 Pan American Games in Santo Domingo, Dominican Republic, and was selected to represent Argentina, as the oldest member of the team (aged 52), at the 2004 Summer Olympics. Having started shooting for more than three decades, Modesti trained throughout his career for the Rio Shooting Federal Club (Spanish: Tiro Federal de Rio) under head coach Juan Carlos Sampayo.

Modesti qualified for the Argentine squad in pistol shooting at the 2004 Summer Olympics in Athens, by having achieved a mandatory Olympic standard of 576 and picking up the silver medal in the air pistol from the Pan American Games. Modesti fired 559 points to obtain the forty-fourth spot in the men's 10 m air pistol, and then marked a score of 548 to share a thirtieth-place finish with Chinese Taipei's Chang Yi-ning in the men's 50 m pistol, falling short of his chance to advance further into the final for both events.
