= Frank Seeger =

German sports shooter

Frank Seeger (born 1 October 1972) is a German sport shooter who competed in the 2004 Summer Olympics.
