= Seo Joo-hyung =

South Korean sport shooter

Seo Joo-hyung (born 25 March 1980) is a South Korean sport shooter who competed in the 2004 Summer Olympics.
