= Liu Zhiwei =

Chinese sport shooter

Liu Zhiwei (simplified Chinese: 刘志伟; traditional Chinese: 劉志偉; pinyin: Liú Zhìwěi; born December 18, 1981, in Beijing) is a male Chinese sports shooter who competed in the 2004 Summer Olympics.

In 2004, he finished 19th in the men's 50 metre rifle three positions competition.
