= Yao Ye =

Chinese sports shooter (born 1973)

Yao Ye (simplified Chinese: 姚烨; traditional Chinese: 姚燁; pinyin: Yáo Yè; born April 10, 1973, in Yangzhou, Jiangsu) is a male Chinese sports shooter who competed in the 2004 Summer Olympics.

In 2004 he finished 32nd in the men's 50 metre rifle prone competition.
