= Daisy de Bock =

Belgian sport shooter

Personal information
- Full name: Daisy de Bock
- Nationality: Belgium
- Born: 10 August 1974 (age 51) Beveren, Belgium
- Height: 1.69 m (5 ft 6 1/2 in)
- Weight: 63 kg (139 lb)

Sport
- Sport: Shooting
- Event: 10 m air rifle (AR40)
- Club: Karabijnclub Dingo
- Coached by: Viaene Alain (national)

Daisy de Bock (born 10 August 1974, in Beveren) is a Belgian sport shooter. She has been selected to compete for Belgium in air rifle shooting at the 2004 Summer Olympics, and has yielded numerous top 10 finishes in a major international competition, spanning the ISSF World Cup series and the European Championships. De Bock trains under the tutelage of Viaene Alain for the national team, while shooting at Dingo Rifle Club (Dutch: Karabijnclub Dingo) in Moerbeke.

De Bock qualified as a lone shooter for the Belgian squad in the women's 10 m air rifle at the 2004 Summer Olympics in Athens. She had registered a minimum qualifying standard of 396 to secure an Olympic berth for Belgium, after finishing fifth in her pet event at the European Championships in Gothenburg, Sweden less than a year earlier. De Bock aimed an inauspicious 95 at the opening series that stumbled her down the leaderboard early to a thirty-third place draw with three other shooters in the qualifying stage, ending up at 388 points out of a possible 400.
