= Marco Spangenberg =

German sports shooter (born 1980)

Marco Spangenberg (born 28 August 1980) is a German sport shooter who competed in the 2004 Summer Olympics.
