= Cornelia Frölich =

Swiss pistol shooter

Personal information
- Nationality: Switzerland
- Born: 23 May 1964 (age 62) Zurich, Switzerland
- Height: 1.68 m (5 ft 6 in)
- Weight: 54 kg (119 lb)

Sport
- Sport: Shooting
- Event(s): 10 m air pistol (AP40); 25 m pistol (SP)
- Club: Schützengesellschaft der Stadt; Zürich
- Coached by: Beat Brüngger

Cornelia Frölich (born 23 May 1964 in Zurich) is a Swiss sport shooter. At age forty, Frolich made her official debut for the 2004 Summer Olympics in Athens, where she placed seventh in the 10 m air pistol, and thirty-fourth in the 25 m pistol, accumulating scores of 481.5 and 381 points, respectively.

Four years after competing in her last Olympics, Frolich qualified for her second Swiss team, as a 44-year-old, at the 2008 Summer Olympics in Beijing, by finishing eighth in the air pistol from the 2007 ISSF World Cup series in Sydney, Australia. She finished only in seventeenth place by two points ahead of Australia's Lalita Yauhleuskaya from the final attempt, for a total score of 381 targets.
