= 2003 ISSF World Cup =

Shooting sport competition in Italy

For the 2003 ISSF World Cup in the seventeen Olympic shooting events, the World Cup Final was held in October 2003 in Milan, Italy for the rifle, pistol and running target events, and in Rome, Italy for the shotgun events.

== Rifle, pistol and running target ==
=== Men's individual ===
10m Air Rifle
Stage	Venue	1st place, gold medalist(s)	2nd place, silver medalist(s)	3rd place, bronze medalist(s)
1	(United States) Fort Benning	Liu Zhiwei (CHN)	Péter Sidi (HUN)	Konstantin Prikhodtchenko (RUS)
2	(Croatia) Zagreb	Péter Sidi (HUN)	Torsten Krebs (GER)	Robert Kraskowski (POL)
3	(Germany) Munich	Jason Parker (USA)	Konstantin Prikhodtchenko (RUS)	Abhinav Bindra (IND)
4	(South Korea) Changwon	Yao Ye (CHN)	Tevarit Majchacheep (THA)	Liu Zhiwei (CHN)
Final	(Italy) Milan	Péter Sidi (HUN)	Yao Ye (CHN)	Tevarit Majchacheep (THA)

50m Rifle 3 Positions
Stage	Venue	1st place, gold medalist(s)	2nd place, silver medalist(s)	3rd place, bronze medalist(s)
1	(United States) Fort Benning	Artyom Khadjibekov (RUS)	Konstantin Prikhodtchenko (RUS)	Péter Sidi (HUN)
2	(Croatia) Zagreb	Jozef Gönci (SVK)	Matthew Emmons (USA)	Marcel Bürge (SUI)
3	(Germany) Munich	Rajmond Debevec (SLO)	Thomas Farnik (AUT)	Artyom Khadjibekov (RUS)
4	(South Korea) Changwon	Thomas Farnik (AUT)	Liu Zhiwei (CHN)	Matthew Emmons (USA)
Final	(Italy) Milan	Rajmond Debevec (SLO)	Konstantin Prikhodtchenko (RUS)	Artyom Khadjibekov (RUS)

The winners in Milan were:

- Rajmond Debevec, Slovenia, in men's 50 m Rifle Three Positions
- Torben Grimmel, Denmark, in men's 50 m Rifle Prone
- Péter Sidi, Hungary, in men's 10 m Air Rifle
- Xu Dan, China, in men's 50 m Pistol
- Marco Spangenberg, Germany, in men's 25 m Rapid Fire Pistol
- Mikhail Nestruev, Russia, in men's 10 m Air Pistol
- Li Jie, China, in men's 10 m Running Target
- Lioubov Galkina, Russia, in women's 50 m Rifle Three Positions
- Anjali Bhagwat, India, in women's 10 m Air Rifle
- Chen Ying, China, in women's 25 m Pistol
- Olena Kostevych, Ukraine, in women's 10 m Air Pistol

== Shotgun ==
The winners in Rome were:

- Giovanni Pellielo, Italy, in men's Trap
- Ahmed Al Maktoum, United Arab Emirates, in men's Double Trap
- Ennio Falco, Italy, in men's Skeet
- Gao E, China, in women's Trap
- Li Qingnian, China, in women's Double Trap
- Svetlana Demina, Russia, in women's Skeet
