= Shooting at the 2004 Summer Olympics – Men's 50 metre rifle prone =

Men's 50 metre rifle prone at the Games of the XXVIII Olympiad
- Venue: Markópoulo Olympic Shooting; Centre
- Date: August 20, 2004
- Competitors: 46 from 34 nations
- Winning score: 703.3

Medalists
1st place, gold medalist(s)		Matthew Emmons	United States
2nd place, silver medalist(s)		Christian Lusch	Germany
3rd place, bronze medalist(s)		Sergei Martynov	Belarus

The men's 50 metre rifle prone competition at the 2004 Summer Olympics was held on August 20 at the Markópoulo Olympic Shooting Centre near Athens, Greece.

The event consisted of two rounds: a qualifier and a final. In the qualifier, each shooter fired 60 shots with a .22 Long Rifle at 50 metres distance from the prone position. Scores for each shot were in increments of 1, with a maximum score of 10.

The top 8 shooters in the qualifying round moved on to the final round. There, they fired an additional 10 shots. These shots scored in increments of .1, with a maximum score of 10.9. The total score from all 70 shots was used to determine final ranking.

23-year-old U.S. shooter Matthew Emmons maintained a single-point lead from the rest of the field in the qualifying round to finish with 703.3 for the rifle prone gold and his first Olympic medal. Germany's Christian Lusch, who had gradually come close on Emmons in an attempt to steal his lead with only two rounds left, ended up taking the silver at 702.2. Meanwhile, Belarus' Sergei Martynov, who had the highest score in the final, shot 105.6 to vault himself from fifth at the start to a bronze-medal position with a total of 701.6, repeating his feat from Sydney 2000.

Sweden's Jonas Edman missed his Olympic title defense after finishing in a distant thirty-second from the prelims with 590 points, while 2000 silver medalist Torben Grimmel also fell short of the finale by just a single point from the cutoff score of 595, relegating to a ninth-place draw with six other shooters.

== Records ==
Prior to this competition, the existing world and Olympic records were as follows.

Qualification records
World record	Wolfram Waibel (AUT)	600	Sydney, Australia	3 March 2004
Olympic record	Christian Klees (GER)	600	Atlanta, United States	25 July 1996

Final records
World record	Christian Klees (GER)	704.8 (600+104.8)	Atlanta, United States	25 July 1996
Olympic record	Christian Klees (GER)	704.8 (600+104.8)	Atlanta, United States	25 July 1996

== Qualification round ==
Rank	Athlete	Country	1	2	3	4	5	6	Total	Notes
1	Matthew Emmons	United States	100	100	99	100	100	100	599	Q
2	Christian Lusch	Germany	100	100	100	99	99	100	598	Q
3	Jozef Gönci	Slovakia	100	100	99	100	100	99	598	Q
4	Maik Eckhardt	Germany	100	100	98	99	99	100	596	Q
5	Sergei Martynov	Belarus	99	99	100	100	99	99	596	Q
6	Michael Babb	Great Britain	98	99	100	99	100	99	595	Q
7	Jia Zhanbo	China	100	99	100	100	97	99	595	Q
8	Marco De Nicolo	Italy	98	100	99	100	100	98	595	Q
9	Artur Ayvazyan	Ukraine	99	100	100	99	99	97	594	
9	Marcel Bürge	Switzerland	99	99	99	100	98	99	594	
9	Rajmond Debevec	Slovenia	98	99	100	99	99	99	594	
9	Torben Grimmel	Denmark	99	100	100	98	98	99	594	
9	Juha Hirvi	Finland	98	100	99	98	100	99	594	
9	Artem Khadjibekov	Russia	98	99	98	100	99	100	594	
9	Igor Pirekeev	Turkmenistan	99	99	99	100	99	98	594	
16	Václav Bečvář	Czech Republic	99	99	100	98	98	98	592	
16	Espen Berg-Knutsen	Norway	99	99	99	100	97	98	592	
16	Mario Knögler	Austria	98	98	99	98	99	100	592	
16	Sergei Kovalenko	Russia	100	99	97	98	99	99	592	
16	Timothy Lowndes	Australia	98	99	99	100	97	99	592	
16	Guy Starik	Israel	99	98	98	99	99	99	592	
16	Harald Stenvaag	Norway	99	100	99	98	99	97	592	
16	Wolfram Waibel Jr.	Austria	99	98	99	99	99	98	592	
24	Michael Anti	United States	98	99	98	99	98	99	591	
24	Aleksandr Babchenko	Kyrgyzstan	99	99	97	98	99	99	591	
24	Tomáš Jeřábek	Czech Republic	98	100	98	99	99	97	591	
24	Park Bong-duk	South Korea	98	100	99	96	99	99	591	
24	Yury Shcherbatsevich	Belarus	97	99	99	98	98	100	591	
24	Péter Sidi	Hungary	97	99	97	99	100	99	591	
24	Vyacheslav Skoromnov	Uzbekistan	96	99	99	99	100	98	591	
24	Masaru Yanagida	Japan	100	100	98	99	97	97	591	
32	Jonas Edman	Sweden	100	99	99	95	98	99	590	
32	Roger Hansson	Sweden	99	98	98	98	99	98	590	
32	Yuriy Sukhorukov	Ukraine	99	100	99	98	95	99	590	
32	Yao Ye	China	100	96	98	98	100	98	590	
36	Evangelos Liogris	Greece	98	96	99	98	99	99	589	
36	Tevarit Majchacheeap	Thailand	98	98	97	99	98	99	589	
36	Ryan Taylor	New Zealand	97	96	99	100	99	98	589	
39	Martin Senore	South Africa	97	99	97	100	96	99	588	
40	Pablo Álvarez	Argentina	96	100	100	97	97	97	587	
40	Dick Boschman	Netherlands	95	98	98	99	98	99	587	
42	Stevan Pletikosić	Serbia and Montenegro	98	98	99	98	94	99	586	
42	Warren Potent	Australia	97	94	97	100	98	100	586	
44	Nedžad Fazlija	Bosnia and Herzegovina	97	98	96	99	99	96	585	
45	Ángel Velarte	Argentina	96	98	96	99	97	98	584	
46	Reinier Estpinan	Cuba	98	97	97	97	95	97	581	

== Final ==
Rank	Athlete	Qual	Final	Total
1st place, gold medalist(s)	Matthew Emmons (USA)	599	104.3	703.3
2nd place, silver medalist(s)	Christian Lusch (GER)	598	104.2	702.2
3rd place, bronze medalist(s)	Sergei Martynov (BLR)	596	105.6	701.6
4	Jozef Gönci (SVK)	598	102.5	700.5
5	Marco De Nicolo (ITA)	595	104.7	699.7
6	Maik Eckhardt (GER)	596	101.6	697.6
7	Michael Babb (GBR)	595	101.8	696.8
8	Jia Zhanbo (CHN)	595	101.6	696.6
