= Shooting at the 2004 Summer Olympics – Men's 50 metre rifle three positions =

Men's 50 metre rifle three positions at the Games of the XXVIII Olympiad
- Venue: Markópoulo Olympic Shooting; Centre
- Date: 22 August 2004
- Competitors: 40 from 29 nations
- Winning score: 1264.5

Medalists
1st place, gold medalist(s)		Jia Zhanbo	China
2nd place, silver medalist(s)		Michael Anti	United States
3rd place, bronze medalist(s)		Christian Planer	Austria

The men's 50 metre rifle three positions competition at the 2004 Summer Olympics was held on 22 August at the Markópoulo Olympic Shooting Centre near Athens, Greece.

The event consisted of two rounds: a qualifier and a final. In the qualifier, each shooter fired 120 shots with a .22 Long Rifle at 50 metres distance. 40 shots were fired each from the standing, kneeling, and prone positions. Scores for each shot were in increments of 1, with a maximum score of 10.

The top 8 shooters in the qualifying round moved on to the final round. There, they fired an additional 10 shots, all from the standing position. These shots scored in increments of .1, with a maximum score of 10.9. The total score from all 130 shots was used to determine the final ranking.

23-year-old U.S. shooter Matthew Emmons commanded his lead throughout the rifle three positions finale for a possible historic small-bore double at these Games, until he aimed at the wrong target on his final shot, as a result of a crossfire and a nullified score, that stumbled him down the leaderboard to a disastrous eighth with 1257.4. Emmons' costly mistake thereby upgraded Chinese shooter Jia Zhanbo to an Olympic gold with a score of 1264.5. The silver medal was awarded to Emmons' fellow marksman Michael Anti at 1263.1, while Austria's Christian Planer, whose target Emmons hit, held off a ferocious challenge from Slovenia's world record holder and defending Olympic champion Rajmond Debevec by a thin 0.2-point margin to take the bronze at 1262.8.

== Records ==
Prior to this competition, the existing world and Olympic records were as follows.

Qualification records
World record	Rajmond Debevec (SLO)	1186	Munich, Germany	29 August 1992
Olympic record	Rajmond Debevec (SLO)	1177	Sydney, Australia	23 September 2000

Final records
World record	Rajmond Debevec (SLO)	1287.9 (1186+101.9)	Munich, Germany	29 August 1992
Olympic record	Rajmond Debevec (SLO)	1275.1 (1177+98.1)	Sydney, Australia	23 September 2000

== Qualification round ==
=== Prone position ===
Detailed prone results

Athlete	Country	1	2	3	4	Total	Notes
Espen Berg-Knutsen	Norway	99	100	100	100	399	
Matthew Emmons	United States	100	100	99	100	399	
Igor Pirekeev	Turkmenistan	100	100	99	100	399	
Marcel Bürge	Switzerland	100	100	100	99	399	
Michael Anti	United States	100	99	99	100	398	
Péter Sidi	Hungary	100	99	99	100	398	
Jia Zhanbo	China	100	100	99	99	398	
Timothy Lowndes	Australia	100	100	99	99	398	
Marco de Nicolo	Italy	100	100	99	99	398	
Artem Khadjibekov	Russia	99	99	99	100	397	
Rajmond Debevec	Slovenia	99	100	99	99	397	
Maik Eckhardt	Germany	100	99	99	99	397	
Jozef Gönci	Slovakia	100	100	100	97	397	
Václav Bečvář	Czech Republic	98	98	100	100	396	
Juha Hirvi	Finland	98	100	98	100	396	
Christian Planer	Austria	99	100	97	100	396	
Christian Lusch	Germany	98	100	99	99	396	
Harald Stenvaag	Norway	100	99	98	99	396	
Artur Ayvazyan	Ukraine	99	100	99	98	396	
Thomas Farnik	Austria	99	98	99	99	395	
Tomáš Jeřábek	Czech Republic	100	99	98	98	395	
Masaru Yanagida	Japan	98	98	98	100	394	
Sergei Martynov	Belarus	99	98	97	100	394	
Vyacheslav Skoromnov	Uzbekistan	100	99	96	99	394	
Pablo Álvarez	Argentina	97	99	100	98	394	
Park Bong-duk	South Korea	98	100	99	97	394	
Liu Zhiwei	China	98	98	100	98	394	
Vitali Bubnovich	Belarus	97	99	97	100	393	
Aleksandr Babchenko	Kyrgyzstan	98	98	99	98	393	
Sergei Kovalenko	Russia	98	98	100	97	393	
Sven Haglund	Sweden	99	97	100	97	393	
Dick Boschman	Netherlands	97	100	97	98	392	
Roger Hansson	Sweden	96	97	99	99	391	
Stevan Pletikosić	Serbia and Montenegro	96	98	98	98	390	
Evangelos Liogris	Greece	99	99	98	95	390	
Yuriy Sukhorukov	Ukraine	98	96	99	97	390	
Roberto José Elias	Mexico	99	99	96	95	389	
Ángel Velarte	Argentina	97	97	98	97	389	
Tevarit Majchacheeap	Thailand	96	99	99	94	388	
Nedžad Fazlija	Bosnia and Herzegovina	96	96	98	98	388	

=== Standing position ===
Detailed standing results

Athlete	Country	1	2	3	4	Total	Notes
Matthew Emmons	United States	99	98	94	96	387	
Jia Zhanbo	China	97	95	98	96	386	
Tevarit Majchacheeap	Thailand	94	95	99	97	385	
Michael Anti	United States	97	96	97	95	385	
Rajmond Debevec	Slovenia	94	94	98	98	384	
Thomas Farnik	Austria	94	98	95	96	383	
Liu Zhiwei	China	94	95	96	97	382	
Jozef Gönci	Slovakia	96	94	97	95	382	
Park Bong-duk	South Korea	96	96	95	95	382	
Stevan Pletikosić	Serbia and Montenegro	95	98	94	95	382	
Christian Planer	Austria	93	94	98	96	381	
Masaru Yanagida	Japan	93	97	95	96	381	
Nedžad Fazlija	Bosnia and Herzegovina	96	96	93	96	381	
Péter Sidi	Hungary	96	90	100	95	381	
Dick Boschman	Netherlands	97	95	94	95	381	
Artur Ayvazyan	Ukraine	95	94	94	97	380	
Sergei Kovalenko	Russia	95	97	94	94	380	
Vyacheslav Skoromnov	Uzbekistan	94	97	97	92	380	
Marcel Bürge	Switzerland	94	95	97	93	379	
Juha Hirvi	Finland	92	94	95	97	378	
Yuriy Sukhorukov	Ukraine	96	94	93	95	378	
Roger Hansson	Sweden	96	96	92	94	378	
Sergei Martynov	Belarus	97	95	92	94	378	
Maik Eckhardt	Germany	93	95	95	94	377	
Marco de Nicolo	Italy	98	94	92	93	377	
Igor Pirekeev	Turkmenistan	95	92	92	97	376	
Christian Lusch	Germany	94	92	94	96	376	
Roberto José Elias	Mexico	92	93	97	94	376	
Tomáš Jeřábek	Czech Republic	96	93	93	93	375	
Artem Khadjibekov	Russia	96	96	92	90	374	
Timothy Lowndes	Australia	92	93	95	94	374	
Espen Berg-Knutsen	Norway	96	92	93	93	374	
Sven Haglund	Sweden	93	95	92	92	372	
Vitali Bubnovich	Belarus	91	92	94	92	369	
Ángel Velarte	Argentina	92	89	91	96	368	
Harald Stenvaag	Norway	93	90	90	95	368	
Václav Bečvář	Czech Republic	92	93	90	92	367	
Aleksandr Babchenko	Kyrgyzstan	91	95	89	89	364	
Evangelos Liogris	Greece	92	87	89	95	363	
Pablo Álvarez	Argentina	87	90	91	92	360	

=== Kneeling position ===
Detailed kneeling results

Athlete	Country	1	2	3	4	Total	Notes
Artem Khadjibekov	Russia	98	99	96	100	393	
Christian Planer	Austria	98	98	99	95	390	
Artur Ayvazyan	Ukraine	98	97	97	98	390	
Sergei Kovalenko	Russia	97	97	97	98	389	
Christian Lusch	Germany	97	97	98	97	389	
Timothy Lowndes	Australia	98	97	97	97	389	
Thomas Farnik	Austria	96	97	97	97	387	
Vyacheslav Skoromnov	Uzbekistan	97	98	97	95	387	
Jia Zhanbo	China	97	97	100	93	387	
Tevarit Majchacheeap	Thailand	96	95	97	98	386	
Yuriy Sukhorukov	Ukraine	98	94	98	96	386	
Roger Hansson	Sweden	96	97	96	97	386	
Juha Hirvi	Finland	96	95	99	96	386	
Park Bong-duk	South Korea	98	96	96	96	386	
Rajmond Debevec	Slovenia	95	97	96	97	385	
Tomáš Jeřábek	Czech Republic	94	98	97	96	385	
Václav Bečvář	Czech Republic	94	97	99	95	385	
Harald Stenvaag	Norway	97	98	97	93	385	
Masaru Yanagida	Japan	97	94	98	95	384	
Espen Berg-Knutsen	Norway	96	94	96	97	383	
Matthew Emmons	United States	97	93	98	95	383	
Maik Eckhardt	Germany	94	98	97	94	383	
Jozef Gönci	Slovakia	97	94	97	95	383	
Vitali Bubnovich	Belarus	97	94	94	97	382	
Michael Anti	United States	96	98	94	94	382	
Liu Zhiwei	China	96	95	94	96	381	
Evangelos Liogris	Greece	93	96	97	95	381	
Dick Boschman	Netherlands	96	95	97	93	381	
Stevan Pletikosić	Serbia and Montenegro	95	96	98	92	381	
Pablo Álvarez	Argentina	96	96	97	92	381	
Igor Pirekeev	Turkmenistan	96	99	94	92	381	
Marcel Bürge	Switzerland	91	97	96	96	380	
Ángel Velarte	Argentina	94	95	97	94	380	
Sergei Martynov	Belarus	95	95	96	94	380	
Péter Sidi	Hungary	97	95	93	93	378	
Sven Haglund	Sweden	95	92	93	97	377	
Nedžad Fazlija	Bosnia and Herzegovina	93	93	97	92	375	
Marco de Nicolo	Italy	92	93	92	96	373	
Aleksandr Babchenko	Kyrgyzstan	95	94	93	91	373	
Roberto José Elias	Mexico	91	93	94	94	372	

=== Combined results ===
Rank	Athlete	Country	Prone	Stand	Kneel	Total	Notes
1	Jia Zhanbo	China	398	386	387	1171	Q
2	Matthew Emmons	United States	399	387	383	1169	Q
3	Christian Planer	Austria	396	381	390	1167	Q
4	Artur Ayvazyan	Ukraine	396	380	390	1166	Q
5	Rajmond Debevec	Slovenia	397	384	385	1166	Q
6	Thomas Farnik	Austria	395	383	387	1165	Q
7	Michael Anti	United States	398	385	382	1165	Q
8	Artem Khadjibekov	Russia	397	374	393	1164	Q
9	Jozef Gönci	Slovakia	397	382	383	1162	
9	Sergei Kovalenko	Russia	393	380	389	1162	
9	Park Bong-duk	South Korea	394	382	386	1162	
12	Timothy Lowndes	Australia	398	374	389	1161	
12	Christian Lusch	Germany	396	376	389	1161	
12	Vyacheslav Skoromnov	Uzbekistan	394	380	387	1161	
15	Juha Hirvi	Finland	396	378	386	1160	
16	Tevarit Majchacheeap	Thailand	388	385	386	1159	
16	Masaru Yanagida	Japan	394	381	384	1159	
18	Marcel Bürge	Switzerland	399	379	380	1158	
19	Maik Eckhardt	Germany	397	377	383	1157	
19	Liu Zhiwei	China	394	382	381	1157	
19	Péter Sidi	Hungary	398	381	378	1157	
22	Espen Berg-Knutsen	Norway	399	374	383	1156	
22	Igor Pirekeev	Turkmenistan	399	376	381	1156	
24	Roger Hansson	Sweden	391	378	386	1155	
24	Tomáš Jeřábek	Czech Republic	395	375	385	1155	
26	Dick Boschman	Netherlands	392	381	381	1154	
26	Yuriy Sukhorukov	Ukraine	390	378	386	1154	
28	Stevan Pletikosić	Serbia and Montenegro	390	382	381	1153	
29	Sergei Martynov	Belarus	394	378	380	1152	
30	Harald Stenvaag	Norway	396	368	385	1149	
31	Václav Bečvář	Czech Republic	396	367	385	1148	
31	Marco de Nicolo	Italy	398	377	373	1148	
33	Vitali Bubnovich	Belarus	393	369	382	1144	
33	Nedžad Fazlija	Bosnia and Herzegovina	388	381	375	1144	
35	Sven Haglund	Sweden	393	372	377	1142	
36	Roberto José Elias	Mexico	389	376	372	1137	
36	Ángel Velarte	Argentina	389	368	380	1137	
38	Pablo Álvarez	Argentina	394	360	381	1135	
38	Evangelos Liogris	Greece	390	363	381	1135	
40	Aleksandr Babchenko	Kyrgyzstan	393	364	373	1130	

== Final ==
Rank	Athlete	Qual	1	2	3	4	5	6	7	8	9	10	Final	Total
1st place, gold medalist(s)	Jia Zhanbo (CHN)	1171	9.4	10.1	10.4	8.4	8.7	9.9	9.9	8.8	7.8	10.1	93.5	1264.5
2nd place, silver medalist(s)	Michael Anti (USA)	1165	10.4	8.8	9.3	10.6	10.8	8.5	10.4	10.8	8.1	10.4	98.1	1263.1
3rd place, bronze medalist(s)	Christian Planer (AUT)	1167	8.6	7.9	9.3	10.6	9.9	10.0	9.6	9.5	9.8	10.6	95.8	1262.8
4	Rajmond Debevec (SLO)	1166	10.0	9.5	10.2	9.8	9.7	9.1	9.6	9.8	10.5	8.4	96.6	1262.6
5	Artem Khadjibekov (RUS)	1164	10.4	9.5	10.0	9.7	9.2	9.7	10.6	9.7	9.1	9.7	97.6	1261.6
6	Thomas Farnik (AUT)	1165	10.2	8.1	9.3	10.0	10.0	9.0	10.7	9.4	9.9	9.8	96.4	1261.4
7	Artur Ayvazyan (UKR)	1166	9.0	8.1	10.2	9.1	10.1	10.0	10.7	9.3	8.7	9.8	95.0	1261.0
8	Matthew Emmons (USA)	1169	9.4	10.4	9.3	10.4	9.5	10.1	9.9	9.4	10.0	0.0	88.4	1257.4
