= Shooting at the 2004 Summer Olympics – Men's 10 metre air rifle =

Men's 10 metre air rifle at the Games of the XXVIII Olympiad
- Venue: Markópoulo Olympic Shooting; Centre
- Date: 16 August 2004
- Competitors: 47 from 33 nations
- Winning score: 702.7 WR

Medalists
1st place, gold medalist(s)		Zhu Qinan	China
2nd place, silver medalist(s)		Li Jie	China
3rd place, bronze medalist(s)		Jozef Gönci	Slovakia

The men's 10 metre air rifle competition at the 2004 Summer Olympics was held on 16 August at the Markópoulo Olympic Shooting Centre near Athens, Greece.

The event consisted of two rounds: a qualifier and a final. In the qualifier, each shooter fired 60 shots with an air rifle at 10 metres distance from the standing position. Scores for each shot were in increments of 1, with a maximum score of 10.

The top 8 shooters in the qualifying round moved on to the final round. There, they fired an additional 10 shots. These shots scored in increments of .1, with a maximum score of 10.9. The total score from all 70 shots was used to determine final ranking.

China's Zhu Qinan stunned the entire worldwide audience as he came from nowhere to snatch the Olympic gold in air rifle shooting, smashing a new world record of 702.7 points. Zhu also enjoyed his teammate Li Jie taking home the silver medal with 702.7, as the Chinese marksmen led the medal haul in a blistering 1–2 finish. Slovakia's world number one Jozef Gönci came up with a steady feat in the final to claim the bronze on 697.4 points. Earlier in the prelims, Zhu set a junior world standard to grab the top seed in the six-man final, just one point short of the perfect grade 600 that had been successfully recorded by Thailand's Tevarit Majchacheeap in 2000.

== Records ==
Prior to this competition, the existing world and Olympic records were as follows.

Qualification records
World record	Tevarit Majchacheeap (THA)	600	Langkawi, Malaysia	27 January 2000
Olympic record	Wolfram Waibel (AUT)	596	Atlanta, United States	22 July 1996

Final records
World record	Jason Parker (USA)	702.5 (599+103.5)	Munich, Germany	15 June 2003
Olympic record	Cai Yalin (CHN)	696.4 (594+102.4)	Sydney, Australia	18 September 2000

== Qualification round ==
Rank	Athlete	Country	1	2	3	4	5	6	Total	Notes
1	Zhu Qinan	China	100	100	100	100	100	99	599	Q, OR
2	Li Jie	China	100	100	100	100	99	99	598	Q
3	Abhinav Bindra	India	99	100	99	100	100	99	597	Q
4	Jozef Gönci	Slovakia	99	98	100	100	100	99	596	Q
5	Cheon Min-ho	South Korea	100	100	99	99	98	99	595	Q
6	Maik Eckhardt	Germany	98	100	100	99	100	98	595	Q
7	Jason Parker	United States	100	99	98	98	99	100	594	Q
8	Je Seong-tae	South Korea	98	98	99	100	100	99	594	Q
9	Matthew Emmons	United States	99	98	100	99	99	99	594	
9	Matej Mészáros	Slovakia	100	99	100	99	98	98	594	
9	Masaru Yanagida	Japan	99	99	98	100	100	98	594	
12	Thomas Farnik	Austria	99	98	100	99	98	99	593	
12	Torsten Krebs	Germany	98	98	99	100	100	98	593	
12	Gagan Narang	India	99	97	99	99	99	100	593	
12	Georgios Petsanis	Greece	98	100	100	99	98	98	593	
12	Christian Planer	Austria	98	99	99	99	98	100	593	
12	Péter Sidi	Hungary	99	98	100	99	99	98	593	
18	Dick Boschman	Netherlands	96	99	99	99	99	100	592	
18	Leif Steinar Rolland	Norway	100	99	99	98	100	97	592	
18	Konstantinos Savorgiannakis	Greece	98	100	98	99	99	98	592	
18	Vyacheslav Skoromnov	Uzbekistan	99	99	99	98	98	99	592	
22	Artur Ayvazyan	Ukraine	99	97	99	100	98	98	591	
22	Oliver Geissmann	Liechtenstein	97	100	100	99	97	98	591	
24	Mohamed Abdellah	Egypt	96	100	99	99	99	97	590	
24	Vitali Bubnovich	Belarus	99	99	99	99	97	97	590	
24	Marco De Nicolo	Italy	94	99	99	100	99	99	590	
24	Artem Khadjibekov	Russia	97	100	97	99	99	98	590	
24	Yuriy Sukhorukov	Ukraine	99	99	99	96	98	99	590	
29	Rajmond Debevec	Slovenia	96	100	99	96	98	100	589	
29	Sven Haglund	Sweden	97	98	99	99	99	97	589	
29	Konstantin Prikhodtchenko	Russia	98	98	96	99	99	99	589	
29	Peter Thuesen	Denmark	99	98	99	98	98	97	589	
33	Marcus Åkerholm	Sweden	99	98	100	96	98	98	588	
33	Aleksandr Babchenko	Kyrgyzstan	99	98	99	99	98	95	588	
35	Nedžad Fazlija	Bosnia and Herzegovina	99	96	97	100	98	97	587	
35	Asif Hossain Khan	Bangladesh	99	98	96	97	98	99	587	
35	Timothy Lowndes	Australia	97	99	96	100	97	98	587	
35	Tevarit Majchacheeap	Thailand	98	99	96	98	100	96	587	
39	Stevan Pletikosić	Serbia and Montenegro	99	98	97	98	96	98	586	
39	Ángel Velarte	Argentina	97	96	99	98	97	99	586	
41	Espen Berg-Knutsen	Norway	96	98	97	99	97	97	584	
41	Matthew Inabinet	Australia	96	98	97	99	98	96	584	
43	Pablo Álvarez	Argentina	96	95	98	97	99	98	583	
44	Roberto José Elias	Mexico	96	96	98	98	99	95	582	
45	Juha Hirvi	Finland	96	98	98	98	94	96	580	
46	Tika Shrestha	Nepal	97	94	96	95	98	99	579	
47	Marcel Bürge	Switzerland	96	95	96	98	95	96	576	

== Final ==
Rank	Athlete	Qual	Final	Total	Shoot-off	Notes
1st place, gold medalist(s)	Zhu Qinan (CHN)	599	103.7	702.7		WR
2nd place, silver medalist(s)	Li Jie (CHN)	598	103.3	701.3		
3rd place, bronze medalist(s)	Jozef Gönci (SVK)	596	101.4	697.4		
4	Cheon Min-ho (KOR)	595	101.6	696.6		
5	Maik Eckhardt (GER)	595	101.3	696.3	10.6	
6	Je Sung-tae (KOR)	594	102.3	696.3	10.4	
7	Abhinav Bindra (IND)	597	97.6	694.6		
8	Jason Parker (USA)	594	100.5	694.5		
