= Sweden at the 2004 Summer Olympics =

- IOC code: SWE
- NOC: Swedish Olympic Committee
- Website: www.sok.se (in Swedish and English)

in Athens
- Competitors: 115 in 20 sports
- Flag bearer: Lars Frölander
- Medals Ranked 19th: Gold 4 Silver 2 Bronze 1 Total 7

Summer Olympics appearances (overview)
- 1896; 1900; 1904; 1908; 1912; 1920; 1924; 1928; 1932; 1936; 1948; 1952; 1956; 1960; 1964; 1968; 1972; 1976; 1980; 1984; 1988; 1992; 1996; 2000; 2004; 2008; 2012; 2016; 2020; 2024; 2028

Other related appearances
- 1906 Intercalated Games

Sweden competed at the 2004 Summer Olympics in Athens, Greece, from 13 to 29 August 2004. This nation has competed at every Summer Olympic Games in the modern era, except for the 1904 Summer Olympics in St. Louis. The Swedish Olympic Committee (Swedish: Sveriges Olympiska Kommitté, SOK) sent the nation's smallest team to the Games since the 1976 Summer Olympics in Montreal. A total of 115 athletes, 62 men and 53 women, competed only in 20 different sports. Women's football was the only team-based sport in which Sweden had its representation at these Games. There was only a single competitor in boxing, diving, artistic gymnastics, judo, modern pentathlon, and rowing.

The Swedish team featured four prominent Olympic medalists: rifle prone shooter Jonas Edman, double trap shooter Pia Hansen, and swimmers Therese Alshammar and defending Olympic champion Lars Frölander, who later became the nation's flag bearer in the opening ceremony. Table tennis players Jörgen Persson and 1992 Olympic champion Jan-Ove Waldner were among the Swedish athletes to compete in fifth Olympics, since the sport had been formally included into the Olympic program in 1988. Notable Swedish athletes also included sprint kayak pair Henrik Nilsson and Markus Oscarsson, Greco-Roman wrestler Ara Abrahamian, who emigrated from his native Armenia to compete for the Swedish team, and tennis player Robin Söderling, the youngest male athlete of the team.

Sweden left Athens with a total of seven Olympic medals, four golds, two silver, and one bronze, matching its gold medal tally with Munich (1972), Montreal (1976), and Sydney (2000). Three individual Swedish athletes had won Olympic gold medals in athletics: Stefan Holm in men's high jump, Christian Olsson in men's triple jump, and Carolina Klüft in women's heptathlon. Meanwhile, sprint kayak pair Nilsson and Oscarsson picked up their first Olympic title in men's K-2 1000 metres, following their silver medal triumph in Sydney four years earlier.

== Medalists ==
Medal	Name	Sport	Event	Date
Gold	Carolina Klüft	Athletics	Women's heptathlon	21 August
Gold	Stefan Holm	Athletics	Men's high jump	22 August
Gold	Christian Olsson	Athletics	Men's triple jump	22 August
Gold	Henrik Nilsson; Markus Oscarsson	Canoeing	Men's K-2 1000 m	27 August
Silver	Malin Baryard-Johnsson; Rolf-Göran Bengtsson; Peter Eriksson; Peder Fredericson	Equestrian	Team jumping	24 August
Silver	Ara Abrahamian	Wrestling	Men's Greco-Roman 84 kg	25 August
Bronze	Therese Torgersson; Vendela Zachrisson	Sailing	Women's 470 class	21 August

== Archery ==
Three Swedish archers qualified each for the men's individual archery, and a spot for the men's team.

Athlete	Event	Ranking round		Round of 64	Round of 32	Round of 16	Quarterfinals	Semifinals	Final / BM	
Athlete	Event	Score	Seed	Opposition Score	Opposition Score	Opposition Score	Opposition Score	Opposition Score	Opposition Score	Rank
Jonas Andersson	Men's individual	653	26	Barnes (AUS); W 160–151	Tsyrempilov (RUS); L 160–162	Did not advance				
Mattias Eriksson	Men's individual	637	46	van Alten (NED); L 146–152	Did not advance					
Magnus Petersson	Men's individual	673	2	Thiamphasone (THA); W 158–95	Godfrey (GBR); L 162–163	Did not advance				
Jonas Andersson; Mattias Eriksson; Magnus Petersson	Men's team	1963	6	—N/a		United States; L 242–246	Did not advance			

== Athletics ==
Swedish athletes have so far achieved qualifying standards in the following athletics events (up to a maximum of 3 athletes in each event at the 'A' Standard, and 1 at the 'B' Standard).

Key

- Note–Ranks given for track events are within the athlete's heat only
- Q = Qualified for the next round
- q = Qualified for the next round as a fastest loser or, in field events, by position without achieving the qualifying target
- NR = National record
- N/A = Round not applicable for the event
- Bye = Athlete not required to compete in round

Men
Track & road events

Athlete	Event	Heat		Quarterfinal		Semifinal		Final	
Athlete	Event	Result	Rank	Result	Rank	Result	Rank	Result	Rank
Robert Kronberg	110 m hurdles	13.47	3 Q	13.39	3 Q	13.42	7	Did not advance	
Mustafa Mohamed	3000 m steeplechase	8:19.37	4 q	—N/a				8:18.05	13
Johan Wissman	200 m	20.60	5 q	20.74	5	Did not advance			

Field events

Athlete	Event	Qualification		Final	
Athlete	Event	Distance	Position	Distance	Position
Stefan Holm	High jump	2.28	=1 Q	2.36	1st place, gold medalist(s)
Patrik Kristiansson	Pole vault	5.60	20	Did not advance	
Christian Olsson	Triple jump	17.68	1 Q	17.79	1st place, gold medalist(s)
Staffan Strand	High jump	2.25	=18	Did not advance	
Linus Thörnblad	High jump	2.20	24	Did not advance	

Women
Track & road events

Athlete	Event	Heat		Semifinal		Final	
Athlete	Event	Result	Rank	Result	Rank	Result	Rank
Jenny Kallur	100 m hurdles	13.11	5	Did not advance			
Susanna Kallur	100 m hurdles	12.89	3 q	12.67	7	Did not advance	

Field events

Athlete	Event	Qualification		Final	
Athlete	Event	Distance	Position	Distance	Position
Carolina Klüft	Long jump	6.73	5 Q	6.63	10
Anna Söderberg	Discus throw	55.49	35	Did not advance	

Combined events – Heptathlon

Athlete	Event	100H	HJ	SP	200 m	LJ	JT	800 m	Final	Rank
Carolina Klüft	Result	13.21	1.91	14.77	23.27	6.78	48.89	2:14.15	6952	1st place, gold medalist(s)
Carolina Klüft	Points	1093	1119	845	1052	1099	839	932	6952	1st place, gold medalist(s)

== Badminton ==
Athlete	Event	Round of 32	Round of 16	Quarterfinal	Semifinal	Final / BM	
Athlete	Event	Opposition Score	Opposition Score	Opposition Score	Opposition Score	Opposition Score	Rank
Marina Andrievskaya	Women's singles	Zhang N (CHN); L 11–4, 3–11, 7–11	Did not advance				
Fredrik Bergström; Johanna Persson	Mixed doubles	Beres / Patrick (CAN); W 15–17, 15–11, 15–4	Prapakamol / Thungthongkam (THA); W 3–15, 17–15, 15–3	Gao L / Zhang J (CHN); L 3–15, 1–15	Did not advance		

== Boxing ==
Sweden sent a single boxer to Athens.

Athlete	Event	Round of 32	Round of 16	Quarterfinals	Semifinals	Final	
Athlete	Event	Opposition Result	Opposition Result	Opposition Result	Opposition Result	Opposition Result	Rank
Patrick Bogere	Light welterweight	Brin (PHI); L 35–43	Did not advance				

== Canoeing ==
=== Sprint ===
Athlete	Event	Heats		Semifinals		Final	
Athlete	Event	Time	Rank	Time	Rank	Time	Rank
Anders Gustafsson	Men's K-1 500 m	1:40.689	6 q	1:41.291	5	Did not advance	
Henrik Nilsson; Markus Oscarsson	Men's K-2 1000 m	3:09.536	1 Q	Bye		3:18.420	1st place, gold medalist(s)
Anna Karlsson; Sofia Paldanius	Women's K-2 500 m	1:44.059	4 q	1:44.570	2 Q	1:43.077	8

Qualification Legend: Q = Qualify to final; q = Qualify to semifinal

== Cycling ==
=== Road ===
Men

Athlete	Event	Time	Rank
Magnus Bäckstedt	Road race	Did not finish	
Gustav Larsson	Road race	5:51:28	72
Marcus Ljungqvist	Road race	5:41:56	14
Thomas Lövkvist	Road race	Did not finish	
Thomas Lövkvist	Time trial	1:03:43.70	33

Women

Athlete	Event	Time	Rank
Susanne Ljungskog	Road race	3:28:39	33
Susanne Ljungskog	Time trial	35:17.25	25
Madeleine Lindberg	Road race	3:33:35	49
Camilla Larsson	Road race	Did not finish	

=== Mountain biking ===
Athlete	Event	Time	Rank
Fredrik Kessiakoff	Men's cross-country	2:21:23	12
Maria Östergren	Women's cross-country	2:16:16	20

== Diving ==
Sweden has qualified a single diver.

Athlete	Event	Preliminaries		Semifinals		Final	
Athlete	Event	Points	Rank	Points	Rank	Points	Rank
Anna Lindberg	3 m springboard	255.63	19	Did not advance			

== Equestrian ==
Because only three horse and rider pairs from each nation could advance beyond certain rounds in the individual events, five American pairs did not advance despite being placed sufficiently high. They received rankings below all pairs that did advance.

=== Dressage ===
Athlete	Horse	Event	Grand Prix		Grand Prix Special		Grand Prix Freestyle		Overall	
Athlete	Horse	Event	Score	Rank	Score	Rank	Score	Rank	Score	Rank
Jan Brink	Briar	Individual	73.250	6 Q	72.265	7 Q	76.650	8	73.727	7
Louise Nathhorst	Guinness	Individual	66.583	=31	Did not advance					
Minna Telde	Sack	Individual	65.375	40	Did not advance					
Tinne Vilhelmsson	Just Mickey	Individual	66.917	29	Did not advance					
Jan Brink; Louise Nathhorst; Minna Telde; Tinne Vilhelmsson	See above	Team	—N/a						68.917	6

=== Eventing ===
Athlete	Horse	Event	Dressage		Cross-country			Jumping						Total	
Athlete	Horse	Event	Dressage		Cross-country			Qualifier			Final			Total	
Athlete	Horse	Event	Penalties	Rank	Penalties	Total	Rank	Penalties	Total	Rank	Penalties	Total	Rank	Penalties	Rank
Linda Algotsson	Stand By Me	Individual	43.60	12	38.80	82.40	47	8.00	90.40	42	Did not advance			90.40	42
Sara Algotsson	Robin des Bois	Individual	56.60	37	11.20	67.80	37	12.00	79.80	33	Did not advance			79.80	33
Magnus Gällerdal	Keymaster	Individual	61.00	47	2.80	63.80	31	0.00	63.80	22 Q	8.00	71.80	17	71.80	17
Linda Algotsson; Sara Algotsson; Magnus Gällerdal	See above	Team	161.20	8	52.80	214.00	11	20.00	234.00	8	—N/a			234.00	9

=== Show jumping ===
Athlete	Horse	Event	Qualification								Final					Total	
Athlete	Horse	Event	Round 1		Round 2			Round 3			Round A		Round B			Total	
Athlete	Horse	Event	Penalties	Rank	Penalties	Total	Rank	Penalties	Total	Rank	Penalties	Rank	Penalties	Total	Rank	Penalties	Rank
Malin Baryard	Butterfly Flip	Individual	0	=1	8	8	=16 Q	4	12	=13 Q	12	=30	Did not advance			12	=30
Rolf-Göran Bengtsson	Mac Kinley	Individual	4	=19 Q	0	4	=5 Q	0	4	3 Q	8	=12 Q	4	12	=5	12	=4
Peter Eriksson	Cardento	Individual	5	=31 Q	4	9	=23 Q	10	19	28	Did not advance					19	28
Peder Fredricson	Magic Bengtsson	Individual	0	=1 Q	8	8	=16 Q	4	12	13 Q	8	=12 Q	4	12	=5	12	=4
Malin Baryard; Rolf-Göran Bengtsson; Peter Eriksson; Peder Fredricson	See above	Team	—N/a								12	=4 Q	8	20	=1	20	2nd place, silver medalist(s)

== Football ==
Summary

Key:

- W – Win D – Draw L – Loss
- A.E.T – After extra time.
- P – Match decided by penalty-shootout.

Team	Event	Group Stage				Quarterfinal	Semifinal	Final / BM	
Team	Event	Opposition Score	Opposition Score	Opposition Score	Rank	Opposition Score	Opposition Score	Opposition Score	Rank
Sweden women's	Women's tournament	Japan; L 0–1	Nigeria; W 2–1	—N/a	1 Q	Australia; W 2–1	Brazil; L 0–1	Germany; L 0–1	4

=== Women's tournament ===
Roster

Head coach: Marika Domanski-Lyfors

Sweden named a squad of 18 players and 4 alternates for the tournament.

No.	Pos.	Player	Date of birth (age)	Caps	Goals	Club
1	GK	Caroline Jönsson	22 November 1977 (aged 26)	55	0	(Swedish Football Association) Malmö FF Dam
2	DF	Karolina Westberg	16 May 1978 (aged 26)	98	0	(Swedish Football Association) Malmö FF Dam
3	DF	Jane Törnqvist	9 May 1975 (aged 29)	96	11	(Swedish Football Association) Djurgårdens IF Dam
4	DF	Hanna Marklund	26 November 1977 (aged 26)	76	4	(Swedish Football Association) Umeå IK
5	DF	Kristin Bengtsson	12 January 1970 (aged 34)	138	14	(Swedish Football Association) Djurgårdens IF Dam
6	MF	Malin Moström	1 August 1975 (aged 29)	85	16	(Swedish Football Association) Umeå IK
7	DF	Sara Larsson	13 May 1979 (aged 25)	43	3	(Swedish Football Association) Malmö FF Dam
8	DF	Frida Östberg	10 December 1977 (aged 26)	24	1	(Swedish Football Association) Umeå IK
9	MF	Malin Andersson (captain)	4 May 1973 (aged 31)	139	38	(Swedish Football Association) Malmö FF Dam
10	FW	Hanna Ljungberg	8 January 1979 (aged 25)	98	55	(Swedish Football Association) Umeå IK
11	FW	Victoria Svensson	18 May 1977 (aged 27)	102	39	(Swedish Football Association) Djurgårdens IF Dam
12	FW	Josefine Öqvist	23 July 1983 (aged 21)	19	4	(Swedish Football Association) Bälinge IF
13	MF	Lotta Schelin	27 February 1984 (aged 20)	4	0	(Swedish Football Association) Kopparberg/Göteborg FC
14	MF	Linda Fagerström	17 March 1977 (aged 27)	83	7	(Swedish Football Association) Djurgårdens IF Dam
15	MF	Therese Sjögran	8 April 1977 (aged 27)	75	6	(Swedish Football Association) Malmö FF Dam
16	FW	Salina Olsson	29 August 1978 (aged 25)	47	9	(Swedish Football Association) Hammarby IF DFF
17	MF	Anna Sjöström	23 April 1977 (aged 27)	39	4	(Swedish Football Association) Umeå IK
18	GK	Hedvig Lindahl	29 October 1983 (aged 20)	6	0	(Swedish Football Association) Linköping FC

Group play

Pos	Team	Pld	W	D	L	GF	GA	GD	Pts	Qualification
1	Sweden	2	1	0	1	2	2	0	3	Qualified for the quarterfinals
2	Nigeria	2	1	0	1	2	2	0	3	Qualified for the quarterfinals
3	Japan	2	1	0	1	1	1	0	3	Qualified for the quarterfinals

11 August 2004
18:00

Sweden	0 – 1	Japan
	Report	Arakawa 24'

Panthessaliko Stadium, Volos
Attendance: 10.104
Referee: Gaye (Senegal)

17 August 2004
18:00

Sweden	2 – 1	Nigeria
Marklund 68'; Moström 73'	Report	Akide 25'

Panthessaliko Stadium, Volos
Attendance: 21.597
Referee: de Oliveira (Brazil)

Quarter-final

20 August 2004
21:00

Sweden	2 – 1	Australia
Ljungberg 25'; Larsson 30'	Report	de Vanna 48'

Panthessaliko Stadium, Volos
Attendance: 4.811
Referee: Damková (Czech Republic)

Semi-final

23 August 2004
18:00

Brazil	1 – 0	Sweden
Pretinha 64'	Report

Pampeloponnisiako Stadium, Patras
Attendance: 1.511
Referee: Ferreira-James (Guyana)

Bronze medal match

26 August 2004
18:00

Germany	1 – 0	Sweden
Lingor 17'	Report

Karaiskaki Stadium, Piraeus
Attendance: 10,416
Referee: Seitz (United States)

== Gymnastics ==
=== Artistic ===
Women

Athlete	Event	Qualification						Final					
Athlete	Event	Apparatus				Total	Rank	Apparatus				Total	Rank
Athlete	Event	V	UB	BB	F	Total	Rank	V	UB	BB	F	Total	Rank
Veronica Wagner	All-around	8.975	8.350	8.900	8.250	34.475	55	Did not advance					

== Judo ==
Athlete	Event	Round of 32	Round of 16	Quarterfinals	Semifinals	Repechage 1	Repechage 2	Repechage 3	Final / BM	
Athlete	Event	Opposition Result	Opposition Result	Opposition Result	Opposition Result	Opposition Result	Opposition Result	Opposition Result	Opposition Result	Rank
Sanna Askelöf	Women's −52 kg	Savón (CUB); L 0000–1000	Did not advance			Lee E-H (KOR); W 1001–0000	Heylen (BEL); L 0000–0201	Did not advance		

== Modern pentathlon ==
One Swedish athlete qualified to compete in the modern pentathlon event through the European Championships.

Athlete	Event	Shooting (10 m air pistol)			Fencing (épée one touch)			Swimming (200 m freestyle)			Riding (show jumping)			Running (3000 m)			Total points	Final rank
Athlete	Event	Points	Rank	MP Points	Results	Rank	MP points	Time	Rank	MP points	Penalties	Rank	MP points	Time	Rank	MP Points	Total points	Final rank
Erik Johansson	Men's	163	=30	892	12–19	26	720	2:06.68	9	1280	84	=6	1116	10:08.20	23	968	4976	23

== Rowing ==
Swedish rowers qualified the following boats:

Women

Athlete	Event	Heats		Repechage		Semifinals		Final	
Athlete	Event	Time	Rank	Time	Rank	Time	Rank	Time	Rank
Frida Svensson	Single sculls	7:54.29	3 R	7:35.35	1 SA/B	7:53.83	5 FB	7:32.02	8

Qualification Legend: FA=Final A (medal); FB=Final B (non-medal); FC=Final C (non-medal); FD=Final D (non-medal); FE=Final E (non-medal); FF=Final F (non-medal); SA/B=Semifinals A/B; SC/D=Semifinals C/D; SE/F=Semifinals E/F; R=Repechage

== Sailing ==
Swedish sailors have qualified one boat for each of the following events.

Men

Athlete	Event	Race											Net points	Final rank
Athlete	Event	1	2	3	4	5	6	7	8	9	10	M*	Net points	Final rank
Daniel Birgmark	Finn	12	13	11	14	14	10	4	7	17	16	~~21~~	118	14
Martin Andersson; Johan Molund	470	18	15	8	~~22~~	1	16	12	4	2	3	15	94	4
Anders Ekström; Fredrik Lööf	Star	15	8	~~OCS~~	14	10	1	14	2	15	9	8	96	12

Women

Athlete	Event	Race											Net points	Final rank
Athlete	Event	1	2	3	4	5	6	7	8	9	10	M*	Net points	Final rank
Therese Torgersson; Vendela Zachrisson	470	9	10	7	2	3	~~14~~	9	6	7	7	3	63	3rd place, bronze medalist(s)

Open

Athlete	Event	Race											Net points	Final rank
Athlete	Event	1	2	3	4	5	6	7	8	9	10	M*	Net points	Final rank
Karl Suneson	Laser	5	10	9	~~25~~	2	9	4	8	17	15	25	104	6
Kristian Mattsson; Martin Strandberg	Tornado	10	11	9	14	~~15~~	15	15	14	9	12	4	113	14

M = Medal race; OCS = On course side of the starting line; DSQ = Disqualified; DNF = Did not finish; DNS= Did not start; RDG = Redress given

== Shooting ==
Eight Swedish shooters (seven men and one woman) qualified to compete in the following events:

Men

Athlete	Event	Qualification		Final	
Athlete	Event	Points	Rank	Points	Rank
Marcus Åkerholm	10 m air rifle	588	=33	Did not advance	
Emil Martinsson	10 m running target	578	4 Q	676.8	4
Niklas Bergström	10 m running target	571	12	Did not advance	
Håkan Dahlby	Double trap	138	2 Q	177 (1)	5
Jonas Edman	50 m rifle prone	590	=32	Did not advance	
Sven Haglund	10 m air rifle	589	=29	Did not advance	
Sven Haglund	50 m rifle 3 positions	1142	35	Did not advance	
Roger Hansson	50 m rifle prone	590	=32	Did not advance	
Roger Hansson	50 m rifle 3 positions	1155	=24	Did not advance	

Women

Athlete	Event	Qualification		Final	
Athlete	Event	Points	Rank	Points	Rank
Pia Hansen	Double trap	105	9	Did not advance	

== Swimming ==
Swedish swimmers earned qualifying standards in the following events (up to a maximum of 2 swimmers in each event at the A-standard time, and 1 at the B-standard time):

Men

Athlete	Event	Heat		Semifinal		Final	
Athlete	Event	Time	Rank	Time	Rank	Time	Rank
Erik Andersson	100 m butterfly	54.26	32	Did not advance			
Martin Gustavsson	100 m breaststroke	1:02.53	22	Did not advance			
Martin Gustavsson	200 m breaststroke	2:17.12	27	Did not advance			
Stefan Nystrand	50 m freestyle	22.42	11 Q	22.18	5 Q	22.08	4
Stefan Nystrand	100 m freestyle	49.75	20	Did not advance			
Lars Frölander; Eric La Fleur; Stefan Nystrand; Mattias Ohlin	4 × 100 m freestyle relay	DSQ		—N/a		Did not advance	

Women

Athlete	Event	Heat		Semifinal		Final	
Athlete	Event	Time	Rank	Time	Rank	Time	Rank
Therese Alshammar	50 m freestyle	25.42	10 Q	25.15	6 Q	24.93	4
Anna-Karin Kammerling	50 m freestyle	25.85	20	Did not advance			
Anna-Karin Kammerling	100 m butterfly	59.84	16 Q	59.33	10	Did not advance	
Josefin Lillhage	100 m freestyle	55.87	14 Q	55.76	14	Did not advance	
Josefin Lillhage	200 m freestyle	2:00.04	6 Q	1:59.31	8 Q	1:59.20	8
Johanna Sjöberg	100 m freestyle	56.66	24	Did not advance			
Johanna Sjöberg	100 m butterfly	1:00.61	21	Did not advance			
Maria Östling	100 m breaststroke	1:10.45	17	Did not advance			
Therese Alshammar; Cathrin Carlzon*; Anna-Karin Kammerling; Josefin Lillhage; Johanna Sjöberg	4 × 100 m freestyle relay	3:41.51	5 Q	—N/a		3.41.22	7
Josefin Lillhage; Ida Mattsson; Johanna Sjöberg*; Malin Svahnström; Lotta Wanberg	4 × 200 m freestyle relay	8:07.17	8 Q	—N/a		8:08.34	8

== Table tennis ==
Three Swedish table tennis players qualified for the following events.

Athlete	Event	Round 1	Round 2	Round 3	Round 4	Quarterfinals	Semifinals	Final / BM	
Athlete	Event	Opposition Result	Opposition Result	Opposition Result	Opposition Result	Opposition Result	Opposition Result	Opposition Result	Rank
Peter Karlsson	Men's singles	Bye	Yang (ITA); W 4–3	Chuang C-Y (TPE); L 2–4	Did not advance				
Jörgen Persson	Men's singles	Bye	Merotohun (NGR); W 4–1	Kreanga (GRE); W 4–0	Chuang C-Y (TPE); L 1–4	Did not advance			
Jan-Ove Waldner	Men's singles	Bye		Karakašević (SCG); W 4–2	Ma L (CHN); W 4–1	Boll (GER); W 4–1	Ryu S-M (KOR); L 1–4	Wang Lq (CHN); L 1–4	4
Jörgen Persson; Jan-Ove Waldner	Men's doubles	—N/a	Bye	Huang / Kassam (CAN); W 4–2	Kong Lh / Wang H (CHN); W 4–1	Maze / Tugwell (DEN); L 1–4	Did not advance		

== Tennis ==
Sweden nominated four male tennis players to compete in the tournament.

Men

Athlete	Event	Round of 64	Round of 32	Round of 16	Quarterfinals	Semifinals	Final / BM	
Athlete	Event	Opposition Score	Opposition Score	Opposition Score	Opposition Score	Opposition Score	Opposition Score	Rank
Jonas Björkman	Men's singles	Fish (USA); L 6–7^{(7–9)}, 0–1 RET	Did not advance					
Thomas Enqvist	Men's singles	Moyà (ESP); L 6–7^{(8–10)}, 7–6^{(9–7)}, 7–9	Did not advance					
Joachim Johansson	Men's singles	Srichaphan (THA); W 6–2, 6–3	Ljubičić (CRO); W 6–7^{(3–7)}, 4–6	Did not advance				
Robin Söderling	Men's singles	López (ESP); L 3–6, 6–3, 4–6	Did not advance					
Jonas Björkman; Joachim Johansson	Men's doubles	—N/a	Ančić / Ljubičić (CRO); L RET	Did not advance				
Thomas Enqvist; Robin Söderling	Men's doubles	—N/a	Erlich / Ram (ISR); L 5–7, 3–6	Did not advance				

== Volleyball ==
=== Beach ===
Athlete	Event	Preliminary round	Standing	Round of 16	Quarterfinals	Semifinals	Final	
Athlete	Event	Opposition Score	Standing	Opposition Score	Opposition Score	Opposition Score	Opposition Score	Rank
Björn Berg; Simon Dahl	Men's	Pool D Høidalen – Kjemperud (NOR); W 2 – 0 (21–13, 21–18); Dieckmann – Reckermann (GER); L 0 – 2 (16–21, 15–21); Hernández – Papaleo (PUR); W 2 – 1 (19–21, 21–16, 18–16)	2 Q	Bosma – Herrera (ESP); L 0 – 2 (16–21, 17–21)	Did not advance			=9

== Wrestling ==
Key:

- VT - Victory by Fall.
- PP - Decision by Points - the loser with technical points.
- PO - Decision by Points - the loser without technical points.

Men's Greco-Roman

Athlete	Event	Elimination Pool				Quarterfinal	Semifinal	Final / BM	
Athlete	Event	Opposition Result	Opposition Result	Opposition Result	Rank	Opposition Result	Opposition Result	Opposition Result	Rank
Jimmy Samuelsson	−66 kg	Galstyan (ARM); W 3–1 ^{PP}	Semenov (RUS); L 1–3 ^{PP}	—N/a	1 Q	Kim I-S (KOR); W 3–1 ^{PP}	Mansurov (AZE); L 1–3 ^{PP}	Manukyan (KAZ); L 1–3 ^{PP}	4
Mohammad Babulfath	−74 kg	Schneider (GER); L 0–3 ^{PO}	Samurgashev (RUS); L 0–3 ^{PO}	Shatskykh (UKR); L 0–5 ^{VB}	4	Did not advance			20
Ara Abrahamian	−84 kg	Matsumoto (JPN); W 3–0 ^{PO}	Bátky (SVK); W 3–0 ^{PO}	Kenjeev (KGZ); W 3–1 ^{PP}	1 Q	Bye	Yerlikaya (TUR); W 3–0 ^{PO}	Mishin (RUS); L 1–3 ^{PP}	2nd place, silver medalist(s)
Martin Lidberg	−96 kg	Koguashvili (RUS); L 1–3 ^{PP}	Lishtvan (BLR); L 0–5 ^{VB}	—N/a	3	Did not advance			18
Eddy Bengtsson	−120 kg	Giorgadze (GEO); W 3–0 ^{PO}	Koutsioumpas (GRE); L 0–3 ^{PO}	Tsurtsumia (KAZ); L 1–3 ^{PP}	3	Did not advance			12

Women's freestyle

Athlete	Event	Elimination Pool			Classification	Semifinal	Final / BM	
Athlete	Event	Opposition Result	Opposition Result	Rank	Opposition Result	Opposition Result	Opposition Result	Rank
Ida-Theres Karlsson	−55 kg	Lazareva (UKR); L 1–3 ^{PP}	Fonseca (PUR); W 3–0 ^{PO}	1 Q	Bye	Verbeek (CAN); L 1–3 ^{PP}	Gomis (FRA); L 0–3 ^{PO}	4
Sara Eriksson	−63 kg	Groß (GER); L 0–3 ^{PO}	Zygouri (GRE); L 1–3 ^{PP}	3	Did not advance			10

== See also ==
- Sweden at the 2004 Summer Paralympics
