= Roger Hansson (sport shooter) =

Swedish sports shooter

Personal information
- Full name: Christer Mats Roger Hansson
- Nationality: Sweden
- Born: 3 April 1970 (age 56) Kalmar, Sweden
- Height: 1.81 m (5 ft 11 1/2 in)
- Weight: 80 kg (176 lb)

Sport
- Sport: Shooting
- Events: 10 m air rifle (AR60); 50 m rifle prone (FR60PR); 50 m rifle 3 positions (FR3X40)
- Club: Mönsterås SF
- Coached by: Stefan Lindblom

Christer Mats Roger Hansson (born 3 April 1970, in Kalmar) is a Swedish sport shooter. He has competed for Sweden in rifle shooting at two Olympics (2000 and 2004), and has attained numerous top ten finishes in a major international competition, spanning the ISSF World Cup series and the European Championships, Hansson trains under head coach Stefan Lindblom for the national team, while shooting at Mönsterås SF.

Hansson's Olympic debut came as a 30-year-old in rifle shooting at the 2000 Summer Olympics in Sydney. There, he finished a lowly twenty-seventh in the air rifle with 587 points, and then shared a credible score of 594 with four other shooters for thirteenth place in the rifle prone. Hansson also competed in his favorite event, the rifle three positions, where he shot a total of 1162, 396 in prone, 379 in standing, and 387 in kneeling, to tie for twelfth place with neighboring Norway's Espen Berg-Knutsen and Austria's Thomas Farnik, having been close to an Olympic final by just three points.

At the 2004 Summer Olympics in Athens, Hansson decided to focus solely on small-bore rifle shooting in his second Games. He managed to get a minimum qualifying score of 596 in the rifle prone to gain an Olympic quota place for Sweden, following his outside-final finish at the European Championships in Plzeň, Czech Republic a year earlier. In the 50 m rifle prone, held a week after the start of the Games, Hansson fired 590 out of a possible 600 to force in a thirty-second place tie with fellow marksman and defending Olympic champion Jonas Edman, Ukraine's Yuriy Sukhorukov, and China's Yao Ye. Two days later, in the 50 m rifle 3 positions, Hansson bounced back from a disastrous rifle prone feat to shoot a total score of 1155 points (391 in prone, 378 in standing, and 386 in the kneeling) for twenty-fourth place, tying with Czech shooter Tomáš Jeřábek.
