= Mohamed Abdellah =

Egyptian sport shooter

Personal information
- Nationality: Egypt
- Born: 7 March 1968 (age 58) Asyut, Egypt
- Height: 1.70 m (5 ft 7 in)
- Weight: 70 kg (154 lb)

Sport
- Sport: Shooting
- Event(s): 10 m air rifle (AR40); 50 m rifle prone (FR60PR); 50 m rifle 3 positions (STR3X20)
- Club: Cairo Army Shooting Club
- Coached by: Ahmed Rached

Mohamed Abdellah (Arabic: محمد عبدالله; born March 7, 1968, in Asyut) is an Egyptian sport shooter. He is a two-time Olympian, and an eight-time medalist (five golds and three silver) in men's small-bore and air rifle at the African Shooting Championships.

At age thirty-six, Abdellah made his official debut for the 2004 Summer Olympics in Athens, where he placed twenty-fourth in the men's 10 m air rifle, with a score of 590 points, tying his position with four other shooters, including Russia's Artem Khadjibekov, and Ukraine's Jury Sukhorukov.

At the 2008 Summer Olympics in Beijing, Abdellah competed for the second time in the men's 10 m air rifle. He finished only in forty-third place by three points behind Kazakhstan's Yuriy Yurkov from the final attempt, for a total score of 586 targets.
