= Dick Boschman =

Dutch sport shooter (born 1974)

Personal information
- Full name: Dick Boschman
- Nationality: Netherlands
- Born: 10 October 1974 (age 52) Elburg, Netherlands
- Height: 1.74 m (5 ft 8 1/2 in)
- Weight: 74 kg (163 lb)

Sport
- Sport: Shooting
- Events: 10 m air rifle (AR60); 50 m rifle prone (FR60PR); 50 m rifle 3 positions (FR3X40)
- Club: sv Oostendorp (gemeente Elburg); St Hubertus Elsen (GER)
Medal record
Men's shooting
Representing the Netherlands
European Championships
| Gold medal – first place | 2001 Pontevedra | AR60 |
| Silver medal – second place | 2000 Munich | AR60 |
| Silver medal – second place | 2004 Győr | AR60 |

Dick Boschman (born 10 October 1974) is a Dutch sport shooter. He has been selected to compete for the Netherlands in two editions of the Olympic Games (2000 and 2004), and has won a career tally of nine medals in a major international competition, spanning the ISSF World Cup series and the European Championships. Boschman trains full-time under trainer Heinz Reinkemeier (GER) for the national team, while practicing at Oostendorp Shooting Range (Dutch: Schietvereniging Oostendorp) in his hometown Elburg.

Boschman's Olympic debut came at the 2000 Summer Olympics in Sydney, where he finished in a three-way tie with Argentina's Pablo Álvarez and France's Franck Badiou for thirty-first position in the air rifle, shooting 586 points out of a possible 600.

Boschman showed his most potential form in bouncing back to the range by earning his only individual gold in the air rifle at the 2001 European Championships in Pontevedra, Spain with 697.8 points, solidifying a narrow 0.2-point lead upon silver medalist Péter Sidi of Hungary. The next season had contributed to a much rapid improvement on Boschman, as he finished seventh in the final of his signature event at the 2002 ISSF World Shooting Championships in Lahti, Finland. Boschman's score of 698.1 points had secured him an Olympic quota place for the Netherlands in his second Games.

At the 2004 Summer Olympics in Athens, Boschman extended his Olympic program to three events in his repertoire, competing in both air and small-bore rifle shooting. Boschman started off with his signature event, 10 m air rifle, where he shot a frustrating 593 out of a possible 600 to tie for eighteenth with three other shooters. Four days later, Boschman came up with an ill-fated aim to get 587 points in the qualifying round of the 50 m rifle prone that saw him toppling down the leaderboard to a distant fortieth in a 46-shooter field. In his third and last event, the 50 m rifle 3 positions, Boschman marked a substantial 392 in prone and 381 each in both standing and kneeling to collect a total score of 1154 points, tying with Ukraine's Yuriy Sukhorukov for twenty-sixth place.
