= Shooting at the 2000 Summer Olympics – Men's 50 metre rifle three positions =

Sports shooting at the Olympics

Men's 50 metre rifle three positions at the Games of the XXVII Olympiad
- Venue: Sydney International Shooting Centre
- Date: 23 September 2000
- Competitors: 44 from 29 nations
- Winning score: 1275.1 (OR)

Medalists
1st place, gold medalist(s)		Rajmond Debevec	Slovenia
2nd place, silver medalist(s)		Juha Hirvi	Finland
3rd place, bronze medalist(s)		Harald Stenvaag	Norway

Men's 50 metre rifle three positions was the last rifle event to be concluded at the 2000 Summer Olympics, on 23 September. The qualification round, consisting of 40 shots from each position, began at 09:00 Australian Eastern Standard Time (UTC+10), and the final round of 10 additional shots standing at 13:15. World record holder Rajmond Debevec won the competition and his first Olympic medal, setting two new Olympic records.

== Records ==
Prior to this competition, the existing World and Olympic records were as follows.

Qualification records
World record	Rajmond Debevec (SLO)	1186	Munich, Germany	29 August 1992
Olympic record	Jean-Pierre Amat (FRA)	1175	Atlanta, United States	27 July 1996

Final records
World record	Rajmond Debevec (SLO)	1287.9 (1186+101.9)	Munich, Germany	29 August 1992
Olympic record	Jean-Pierre Amat (FRA)	1273.9 (1175+98.9)	Atlanta, United States	27 July 1996

== Qualification round ==
Rank	Athlete	Country	Prone	Stand	Kneel	Total	Notes
1	Rajmond Debevec	Slovenia	397	388	392	1177	Q OR
2	Harald Stenvaag	Norway	399	383	393	1175	Q
3	Artem Khadjibekov	Russia	398	382	393	1173	Q
4	Juha Hirvi	Finland	394	384	393	1171	Q
5	Artur Ayvazyan	Ukraine	396	383	391	1170	Q
6	Christian Bauer	Germany	399	383	387	1169	Q
7	Yevgeni Aleinikov	Russia	393	384	389	1166	Q
8	Jozef Gönci	Slovakia	399	376	390	1165	Q
9	Michael Anti	United States	396	377	391	1164	
9	Mario Knögler	Austria	397	381	386	1164	
9	Sergei Martynov	Belarus	398	375	391	1164	
12	Espen Berg-Knutsen	Norway	399	375	388	1162	
12	Thomas Farnik	Austria	393	382	387	1162	
12	Roger Hansson	Sweden	396	379	387	1162	
15	Václav Bečvář	Czech Republic	396	370	395	1161	
15	Nemanja Mirosavljev	FR Yugoslavia	397	374	390	1161	
15	Radim Novak	Czech Republic	396	377	388	1161	
18	Glenn Dubis	United States	396	378	386	1160	
18	Lee Eun-chul	South Korea	395	381	384	1160	
20	Jonas Edman	Sweden	399	375	385	1159	
20	Timothy Lowndes	Australia	395	375	389	1159	
22	Jean-Pierre Amat	France	399	372	387	1158	
22	Oleg Mykhaylov	Ukraine	396	370	392	1158	
22	Samuel Wieland	Australia	393	384	381	1158	
25	Bae Sung-duk	South Korea	397	376	384	1157	
25	Maik Eckhardt	Germany	393	379	385	1157	
25	Anatoli Klimenko	Belarus	396	375	386	1157	
25	Péter Sidi	Hungary	399	375	383	1157	
29	Hrachya Petikyan	Armenia	393	370	393	1156	
29	Stevan Pletikosić	FR Yugoslavia	398	369	389	1156	
31	Ning Lijia	China	393	382	380	1155	
32	Guy Starik	Israel	398	370	386	1154	
33	Pablo Álvarez	Argentina	395	378	377	1150	
33	Jorge González	Spain	396	365	389	1150	
35	Yuri Lomov	Kyrgyzstan	387	372	388	1147	
36	Jaco Henn	South Africa	396	364	385	1145	
37	Tevarit Majchacheep	Thailand	390	384	370	1144	
38	Cai Yalin	China	388	376	379	1143	
39	Roberto José Elias Orozco	Mexico	382	380	378	1140	
40	Naoki Kurita	Japan	384	371	383	1138	
41	Nedžad Fazlija	Bosnia and Herzegovina	392	365	375	1132	
42	Wayne Sorensen	Canada	386	369	376	1131	
43	Varavut Majchacheep	Thailand	385	373	368	1126	
44	Corne Basson	South Africa	396	350	379	1125	

OR Olympic record – Q Qualified for final

== Final ==
Rank	Athlete	Qual	1	2	3	4	5	6	7	8	9	10	Final	Total	Notes
1st place, gold medalist(s)	Rajmond Debevec (SLO)	1177	9.8	10.7	8.3	10.0	10.4	9.5	10.5	9.3	9.6	10.0	98.1	1275.1	OR
2nd place, silver medalist(s)	Juha Hirvi (FIN)	1171	10.0	10.5	10.4	8.7	10.3	9.1	9.4	10.3	10.7	10.1	99.5	1270.5	
3rd place, bronze medalist(s)	Harald Stenvaag (NOR)	1175	10.3	9.3	9.2	6.7	9.7	9.0	10.3	10.1	9.0	10.0	93.6	1268.6	
4	Artem Khadjibekov (RUS)	1173	9.9	9.9	10.5	7.9	9.8	10.2	9.9	8.6	9.5	9.0	95.2	1268.2	
5	Artur Ayvazyan (UKR)	1170	9.2	9.5	9.1	9.0	10.1	10.3	10.4	10.4	8.3	10.3	96.6	1266.6	
6	Christian Bauer (GER)	1169	10.1	9.1	9.3	10.1	9.8	9.9	9.0	9.0	10.0	10.7	97.0	1266.0	
7	Yevgeni Aleinikov (RUS)	1166	10.4	10.6	9.4	10.1	9.2	10.5	10.2	10.0	9.6	9.5	99.5	1265.5	
8	Jozef Gönci (SVK)	1165	10.4	9.0	10.5	10.4	10.2	10.0	10.3	9.1	7.0	9.4	96.3	1261.3	

OR Olympic record

== Sources ==
- Official Report of the XXVII Olympiad — Shooting (PDF).
