= Vyacheslav Skoromnov =

Qatari sport shooter

Personal information
- Full name: Vyacheslav Skoromnov
- Nationality: Uzbekistan; Qatar
- Born: 2 March 1974 (age 52) Andijan, Uzbek SSR, Soviet Union
- Height: 1.70 m (5 ft 7 in)
- Weight: 81 kg (179 lb)

Sport
- Sport: Shooting
- Event(s): 10 m air rifle (AR60); 50 m rifle prone (FR60PR); 50 m rifle 3 positions (FR3X40)
- Coached by: Aleksandr Seffarov
Medal record
Men's shooting
Representing Uzbekistan
Asian Championships
Gold medal – first place	2004 Kuala Lumpur	FR60PR
Silver medal – second place	2004 Kuala Lumpur	AR60

Vyacheslav Skoromnov (Russian: Вячеслав Скоромнов; born 2 March 1974 in Andijan) is an Uzbek-born Qatari sport shooter. He has been selected to compete for his native Uzbekistan in rifle shooting at the 2004 Summer Olympics, and has achieved a total of two medals, a gold and a silver, and numerous top ten finishes in a major international competition, spanning the Asian Games (1998 to 2014), and the Asian Championships. Currently living in Doha, Qatar since 2010, Skoromnov holds his dual citizenship to compete internationally in shooting.

Skoromnov qualified for his native Uzbek squad in rifle shooting at the 2004 Summer Olympics in Athens. Having registered a minimum qualifying score of 597, he chased China's eventual Olympic champion Jia Zhanbo through a single-point lead to take the gold medal and fill in the Olympic quota place for Uzbekistan at the Asian Championships in Kuala Lumpur, Malaysia few months earlier. Skoromnov started off with the 10 m air rifle, where he shot a steady 592 out of a possible 600 to tie for eighteenth with three other shooters. Four days later, Skoromnov came up with an ill-fated aim to get 591 points in the qualifying round of his signature event, the 50 m rifle prone, that saw him toppling down the leaderboard to a twenty-fourth in a 46-shooter field. In his third and last event, the 50 m rifle 3 positions, Skoromnov marked a scintillating 394 in prone, 380 in standing, and 387 in kneeling to collect a total score of 1161 points and tie for twelfth place with two-time Olympian Timothy Lowndes of Australia and Olympic silver medalist Christian Lusch of Germany, having been close to an Olympic final by just three points.
