= Ángel Velarte =

Argentine sports shooter

Personal information
- Full name: Ángel Ricardo Velarte Rosando
- Nationality: Argentina
- Born: 8 June 1971 (age 55) Buenos Aires, Argentina
- Height: 1.73 m (5 ft 8 in)
- Weight: 73 kg (161 lb)

Sport
- Sport: Shooting
- Events: 10 m air rifle (AR60); 50 m rifle prone (FR60PR); 50 m rifle 3 positions (FR3X40)
- Club: Tiro Federal La Rioja
- Coached by: Julio Escalante; Ariel Martínez
Medal record
Men's shooting
Representing Argentina
Pan American Games
Gold medal – first place	2003 Santo Domingo	AR60

Ángel Ricardo Velarte Rosando (born June 8, 1971, in Buenos Aires) is an Argentine sport shooter. He won a gold medal in air rifle shooting at the 2003 Pan American Games in Santo Domingo, Dominican Republic, and was selected to compete for Argentina in two editions of the Olympic Games (1996 and 2004). Having started shooting at the age of fifteen, Velarte served most of his sporting career as a full-time member of the La Rioja Shooting Federation (Spanish: Tiro Federal La Rioja) in his native Buenos Aires under head coaches Julio Escalante and Ariel Martínez.

Velarte's Olympic debut came at the 1996 Summer Olympics in Atlanta, where he wound up a thirty-eighth spot in the 10 m air rifle, and then edged out his compatriot Ricardo Rusticucci by a three-point advantage to take the forty-fourth position in the 50 m rifle 3 positions, accumulating a tally of 577 and 1,142 points, respectively.

Despite missing out his 2000 Olympic bid, Velarte reached the peak of his shooting career by claiming the first gold medal for Argentina in the men's air rifle at the 2003 Pan American Games in Santo Domingo, Dominican Republic with a total score of 692.5 points. Because of his remarkable victory, Velarte had guaranteed a place on the Argentine team and attained a mandatory minimum score to compete for the Olympics, signifying his return from an eight-year absence.

At the 2004 Summer Olympics in Athens, Velarte qualified for his second Argentine squad in rifle shooting. In the 10 m air rifle, Velarte shot 586 out of 600 to finish in a two-way tie with Serbia and Montenegro's Stevan Pletikosić for thirty-ninth place. Four days later, in the 50 m rifle prone, Velarte scored 584 points to grab the penultimate position in a field of forty-six shooters, betraying a three-point gap from Cuba's Reinier Estpinan in the prelims. In his third and last event, 50 m rifle 3 positions, Velarte fired 394 in the prone position, 368 in the standing, and 380 in the kneeling to accumulate an overall record of 1,137 points, leaving him in thirty-sixth place along with Mexico's Roberto José Elias.
