= Shooting at the 2010 South American Games – Men's 10m air rifle =

The Men's 10m air rifle event at the 2010 South American Games was held on March 23, with the qualification at 8:00 and the Finals at 11:00.

== Individual ==
=== Medalists ===
Gold	Silver	Bronze
Marcos Antonio Garcia; Chile	Marcelo Albizu; Argentina	Cristian Jaime Bustos; Bolivia

=== Results ===
==== Qualification ====
Rank	Athlete	Series						Total	Shoot-off
Rank	Athlete	1	2	3	4	5	6	Total	Shoot-off
1	Marcelo Albizu (ARG)	97	99	100	97	96	97	586	
2	Marcos Antonio Garcia (CHI)	97	97	98	99	96	97	584	
3	Cristian Jaime Bustos (BOL)	97	96	96	97	96	98	580	
4	Rocco Rosito (BRA)	95	98	97	98	97	94	579	
4	Mauricio Andres Garcia (CHI)	94	96	99	96	96	98	579	
6	Cristian Fernando Andrade (ECU)	96	95	97	98	94	97	577	
7	Cesar Renato Laos (PER)	97	94	97	96	95	96	575	
8	Julio Cesar Iemma (VEN)	93	98	95	96	95	97	574	
8	Guilherme Ferreira (BRA)	94	96	97	96	95	96	574	
10	Pablo Alvarez (ARG)	95	97	93	97	96	95	573	
11	Ivan Camilo Gasca (COL)	93	97	97	97	95	93	572	
12	Carlos Hernandez (COL)	93	95	94	94	95	97	568	
13	Miguel Alonso Miranda (PER)	94	95	91	93	95	98	566	
14	Jose Julio Cruz (ECU)	93	95	96	92	92	91	558	
	Raul Vargas (VEN)							DSQ	

==== Final ====
Rank	Athlete	Qual Score	Final Score	Total	Shoot-off
1st place, gold medalist(s)	Marcos Antonio Garcia (CHI)	584	100.3	684.3	
2nd place, silver medalist(s)	Marcelo Albizu (ARG)	586	97.2	683.2	
3rd place, bronze medalist(s)	Cristian Jaime Bustos (BOL)	580	100.2	680.2	
4	Mauricio Andres Garcia (CHI)	579	100.9	679.9	
5	Rocco Rosito (BRA)	579	100.9	679.9	
6	Cristian Fernando Andrade (ECU)	577	100.3	677.3	
7	Julio Cesar Iemma (VEN)	574	100.2	674.2	
8	Cesar Renato Laos (PER)	575	98.7	673.7	

== Team ==
=== Medalists ===
Gold	Silver	Bronze
Marcos Antonio Garcia; Mauricio Andres Garcia; Chile	Marcelo Albizu; Pablo Alvarez; Argentina	Rocco Rosito; Guilherme Ferreira; Brazil

=== Results ===
Rank	Athlete	Series						Total
Rank	Athlete	1	2	3	4	5	6	Total
1st place, gold medalist(s)	Chile							1163
1st place, gold medalist(s)	Marcos Antonio Garcia (CHI)	97	97	98	99	96	97	584
1st place, gold medalist(s)	Mauricio Andres Garcia (CHI)	94	96	99	96	96	98	579
2nd place, silver medalist(s)	Argentina							1159
2nd place, silver medalist(s)	Marcelo Albizu (ARG)	97	99	100	97	96	97	586
2nd place, silver medalist(s)	Pablo Alvarez (ARG)	95	97	93	97	96	95	573
3rd place, bronze medalist(s)	Brazil							1153
3rd place, bronze medalist(s)	Rocco Rosito (BRA)	95	98	97	98	97	94	579
3rd place, bronze medalist(s)	Guilherme Ferreira (BRA)	94	96	97	96	95	96	574
4	Peru							1141
4	Cesar Renato Laos (PER)	97	94	97	96	95	96	575
4	Miguel Alonso Miranda (PER)	94	95	91	93	95	98	566
5	Colombia							1140
5	Ivan Camilo Gasca (COL)	93	97	97	97	95	93	572
5	Carlos Hernandez (COL)	93	95	94	94	95	97	568
6	Ecuador							1135
6	Cristian Fernando Andrade (ECU)	96	95	97	98	94	97	577
6	Jose Julio Cruz (ECU)	93	95	96	92	92	91	558
