= Tomáš Jeřábek =

Czech sport shooter (born 1973)

Personal information
- Nationality: Czech Republic
- Born: 11 June 1973 (age 53) Mladá Boleslav, Czechoslovakia
- Height: 1.83 m (6 ft 0 in)
- Weight: 81 kg (179 lb)

Sport
- Sport: Shooting
- Event(s): 10 m air rifle (AR40); 50 m rifle prone (FR60PR); 50 m rifle 3 positions (STR3X20)
- Club: ŠKP Rapid Plzeň
- Coached by: Petr Kurka
Medal record
Men's shooting
Representing Czech Republic
World Championships
Silver medal – second place	2002 Lahti	300FR60PR
Bronze medal – third place	2002 Lahti	300FR3X40

Tomáš Jeřábek (born 11 June 1973) is a Czech sport shooter. Jeřábek had won two medals (silver and bronze), and eventually set a world record of 3,511 points for the Czech rifle shooting team at the 2002 ISSF World Championships in Lahti, Finland. He is a two-time Olympian, and also, a member of the shooting team for ŠKP Rapid Plzeň, under his coach Petr Kurka.

Jeřábek made his official debut for the 2004 Summer Olympics in Athens, where he competed in two rifle shooting events. In his first event, 50 m rifle prone, Jeřábek placed twenty-fourth in the preliminary rounds, with a total score of 591 points, tying his position with six other shooters, including Belarus' Yury Shcherbatsevich, and United States' Michael Anti. Few days later, he competed for his second event, 50 m rifle 3 positions, where he was able to shoot 395 targets in a prone position, 375 in standing, and 385 in kneeling, for a total score of 1,155 points, finishing again in twenty-fourth place.

At the 2008 Summer Olympics in Beijing, Jeřábek qualified for the second time in the 50 m rifle prone, along with his teammate Miroslav Varga. He finished only in forty-sixth place by one point behind Bosnia and Herzegovina's Nedžad Fazlija from the final attempt, for a total score of 586 targets.
