= Evangelos Liogris =

Greek sport shooter (born 1974)

Personal information
- Full name: Evangelos Liogris
- Nationality: Greece
- Born: 27 June 1974 (age 51) Athens, Greece
- Height: 1.76 m (5 ft 9 1/2 in)
- Weight: 80 kg (176 lb)

Sport
- Sport: Shooting
- Event(s): 10 m air rifle (AR60); 50 m rifle prone (FR60PR); 50 m rifle 3 positions (FR3X40)
- Club: ASO Ekati
- Coached by: Goran Maksimović

Evangelos Liogris (Greek: Ευάγγελος Λιόγρης; born 27 June 1974 in Athens) is a Greek sport shooter. He was selected as one of eleven shooters to represent the host nation Greece at the 2004 Summer Olympics in Athens, and had attained a top five finish in rifle shooting at a single meet of the ISSF World Cup series on that same year. Liogris trains under Serbian-born head coach and 1988 Olympic champion Goran Maksimović for the national team, while shooting at ASO Ekati on the outskirts of Athens.

Liogris was named as part of the host nation's shooting team to compete in small-bore rifle at the 2004 Summer Olympics in his native Athens. He had registered a minimum qualifying score of 1138 in the rifle three positions from his outside-final finish at the ISSF World Cup meet in Munich, Germany, to fill in the Olympic berth reserved to the host nation. In the 50 m rifle prone, held a week after the start of the Games, Liogris fired 589 out of a possible 600 to force in a thirty-sixth place tie with New Zealand's Ryan Taylor and Thailand's world record holder Tevarit Majchacheeap. Two days later, in the 50 m rifle 3 positions, Liogris shot a substantial 390 in prone and 381 in the kneeling stage, but his standing mark of 363 slipped him out of contention to a distant thirty-eighth place tie with Argentina's two-time Olympian Pablo Álvarez in a 40-shooter field, posting a combined score of 1135 points.
