= Je Seong-tae =

South Korean sports shooter

Personal information
- Nationality: South Korean
- Born: 28 September 1975 (age 51)

Sport
- Sport: Sports shooting

Je Seong-tae (born 28 September 1975) is a South Korean sports shooter. He competed in the men's 10 metre air rifle event at the 2004 Summer Olympics.
