= Timothy Lowndes =

Australian sports shooter (born 1979)

Personal information
- Full name: Timothy Quentin Lowndes
- Nationality: Australia
- Born: 28 September 1979 (age 47) Lilydale, Victoria, Australia
- Height: 1.84 m (6 ft 1/2 in)
- Weight: 87 kg (192 lb)

Sport
- Sport: Shooting
- Events: 10 m air rifle (AR60); 50 m rifle prone (FR60PR); 50 m rifle 3 positions (FR3X40)
- Club: Townsville Smallbore Rifle Club
- Coached by: Miroslav Šipek
Medal record
Men's shooting
Representing Australia
Commonwealth Games
Gold medal – first place	1998 Kuala Lumpur	Men's 50m Rifle 3 Position
Silver medal – second place	1998 Kuala Lumpur	Men's 50m Rifle 3 Position (Pair)
Bronze medal – third place	1998 Kuala Lumpur	Men's 50m Rifle Prone (Pair)
Gold medal – first place	2002 Manchester	Men's 50m Rifle Prone
Gold medal – first place	2002 Manchester	Men's 50m Rifle 3 Position (Pair) -
Silver medal – second place	2002 Manchester	Men's 50m Rifle 3 Position
Bronze medal – third place	2002 Manchester	Men's 10m Air Rifle

Timothy Quentin Lowndes (born 28 September 1979 in Lilydale, Victoria) is an Australian sport shooter. He has competed for Australia in rifle shooting at two Olympics (2000 and 2004), and has been close to an Olympic final in 2004, finishing twelfth in the rifle three positions. Apart from his Olympic career, Lowndes has won a total of seven medals in a major international competition, spanning two editions of the Commonwealth Games (1998 and 2002), and the Oceanian Championships. Throughout his sporting career, Lowndes trains full-time under Yugoslav-born head coach and 1976 Olympian Miroslav Šipek of the national team, while he shoots at Townsville Smallbore Rifle Club on the outskirts of Melbourne.

Lowndes began shooting small-bore rifle at the age of thirteen, and then became a Commonwealth Games champion in the rifle three positions when he was nineteen. Two years later, Lowndes made his Olympic debut as part of the host nation's shooting team in Sydney 2000. There, he finished a lowly forty-first in the air rifle with 582 points, and then shared a credible score of 593 with his fellow marksman Warren Potent for nineteenth place in the rifle prone. Lowndes also competed in his favourite event, the rifle three positions, where he shot a total of 1159 points, 395 in prone, 375 in standing, and 389 in kneeling, to force in a two-way tie with Sweden's Olympic rifle prone champion Jonas Edman for a frustrating twentieth out of forty-four shooters.

In 2002, Lowndes was able to back up his feat from the Olympics at the Commonwealth Games in Manchester. There, he set a new Games record at 699.8 to deny Great Britain's Michael Babb a gold medal in the rifle prone. Lowndes captured a silver in the rifle three positions with 1251.2 points to add up his medal tally to two at these Games, narrowly losing the title to India's Charan Singh by a close, 0.3-point margin. The next season contributed to another monumental success for Lowndes, as he managed to get a gold medal and an Olympic quota place for Australia in his favourite event at the Oceanian Championships in Auckland, New Zealand with a steady 1231.4.

At the 2004 Summer Olympics in Athens, Lowndes qualified for his second Aussie team in rifle shooting. In the 10 m air rifle, held on the third day of the Games, Lowndes shot 587 out of a possible 600 to tie for thirty-fifth place with three other shooters. Four days later, Lowndes bounced back from a dismal air rifle showing to attain a perfect 100 and three sets of 99 for a total score of 592 in the 50 m rifle prone, vaulting him up to sixteenth position. Lowndes' run ended in his signature event, 50 m rifle 3 positions, where he fired a brilliant 398 in prone, 374 in standing, and 389 in the kneeling to finish in twelfth with a total score of 1161, having been close to an Olympic final cutoff by just three points.
