= Corne Basson =

South African sport shooter (born 1967)

Corne Basson (born 15 December 1967) is a South African sport shooter. He competed at the 2000 Summer Olympics in the men's 50 metre rifle three positions event, in which he placed 44th, and the men's 50 metre rifle prone event, in which he tied for 47th place.
