= Jozef Gönci =

Slovak sport shooter

Personal information
- Nationality: Slovak
- Born: 18 March 1974 (age 52) Košice, Czechoslovakia

Sport
- Sport: Shooting
Medal record
Olympic medal record
Men's shooting
Representing Slovakia
Bronze medal – third place	1996 Atlanta	50 m prone
Bronze medal – third place	2004 Athens	10 m Air Rifle

Jozef Gönci (born 18 March 1974 in Košice) is a Slovak sport shooter, specialising in the 50 m Rifle and 10 m Air Rifle. Gönci won independent Slovakia's first ever Olympic Medal, a bronze in Atlanta in 1996. He won another bronze medal eight years later at the 2004 Olympic Games in Athens.

Olympic results
Event	1996	2000	2004	2008	2012
50 metre rifle three positions	5th 1166+101.7	8th 1165+96.3	9th 1162	37th 1154	33rd 1157
50 metre rifle prone	(bronze) Bronze; 599+102.9	DNS	4th 598+102.5	16th 593	39th 589
10 metre air rifle	28th 584	11th 590	(bronze) Bronze; 596+101.4	—	31st 591

Awards
Preceded by Martina Moravcová	Sportsperson of Slovakia; 1999	Succeeded by Martina Moravcová
Olympic Games
Preceded by Elena Kaliská	Flagbearer for Slovakia; London 2012	Succeeded by Danka Barteková
