= Konstantinos Savorgiannakis =

Greek sport shooter

Personal information
- Full name: Konstantinos Savorgiannakis
- Nationality: Greece
- Born: 2 March 1969 (age 57) Nea Anchialos, Volos, Greece
- Height: 1.75 m (5 ft 9 in)
- Weight: 90 kg (198 lb)

Sport
- Sport: Shooting
- Event: 10 m air rifle (AR60)
- Club: Olympiakos
- Coached by: Goran Maksimović

Konstantinos Savorgiannakis (Greek: Κωνσταντίνος Σαβοργιαννάκης; born 2 March 1969 in Nea Anchialos, Volos) is a Greek sport shooter. He was selected as one of eleven shooters to represent the host nation Greece at the 2004 Summer Olympics in Athens, and had attained numerous top 20 finishes in air rifle shooting at various meets of the ISSF World Cup series. Savorgiannakis trains under Serbian-born head coach and 1988 Olympic champion Goran Maksimović for the national team, while shooting at Olympiakos in Athens.

Savorgiannakis was named as part of the host nation's shooting team to compete in the men's 10 m air rifle at the 2004 Summer Olympics in Athens. He had registered a minimum qualifying score of 592 from his outside-final finish at the European Championships to fill in one of the Olympic berths reserved to the host nation, after the Hellenic Shooting Federation decided to exchange spots in his pet event with the unused quotas from the men's air and rapid fire pistol. Amassing a mighty roar from the crowd, Savorgiannakis targeted a substantial 592 out of a possible 600 to tie for eighteenth place with three other marksmen in the qualifying round, but fell short to reach the Olympic final by just a single point.
