= Aleksandr Babchenko =

Kyrgyzstani sport shooter

Personal information
- Full name: Aleksandr Babchenko
- Nationality: Kyrgyzstan
- Born: 9 December 1971 (age 54) Frunze, Kirghiz SSR, Soviet Union
- Height: 1.70 m (5 ft 7 in)
- Weight: 81 kg (179 lb)

Sport
- Sport: Shooting
- Event(s): 10 m air rifle (AR60); 50 m rifle prone (FR60PR); 50 m rifle 3 positions (FR3X40)
- Coached by: Sergey Nikishov

Aleksandr Babchenko (Russian: Александр Бабченко; born 9 December 1971 in Bishkek) is a Kyrgyzstani sport shooter. He has been selected to compete for Kyrgyzstan in rifle shooting at the 2004 Summer Olympics, and has achieved numerous top ten finishes in a major international competition, spanning the Asian Games, and the Asian Championships. Babchenko trains under his longtime coach Sergey Nikishov for the national team, while serving in the army.

Babchenko qualified as a lone shooter for the Kyrgyz squad in rifle shooting at the 2004 Summer Olympics in Athens. He had been granted an Olympic invitation for his country in the 10 m air rifle by ISSF and IOC, having registered a minimum qualifying score of 593 from his outside-final finish at the Worlds two years earlier. Babchenko started off with his signature event, the 10 m air rifle, where he shot an ill-fated 588 out of a possible 600 to finish in a two-way tie with Sweden's Marcus Åkerholm for thirty-third position. Four days later, Babchenko came up with a much substantial aim to get 591 in the qualifying round of the 50 m rifle prone, vaulting him up to twenty-fourth from his dismal air rifle feat. In his third and last event, the 50 m rifle 3 positions, Babchenko rounded out the 40-shooter field to last place with a qualifying score of 1130 points (393 in prone, 364 in standing, and 373 in the kneeling).
