= Harald Stenvaag =

Norwegian sport shooter (born 1953)

Personal information
- Born: 5 March 1953 (age 73) Ålesund, Møre og Romsdal, Norway
Medal record
Men's shooting
Representing Norway
Olympic Games
Silver medal – second place	1992 Barcelona	50 m rifle prone
Bronze medal – third place	2000 Sydney	50 m rifle 3 pos
World Championships
Gold medal – first place	1982 Caracas	300m Standard Rifle
Gold medal – first place	1990 Moscow	300m Rifle Prone
Gold medal – first place	1991 Stavanger	10m Air Rifle
Silver medal – second place	1982 Caracas	50m Rifle Standing
Silver medal – second place	1986 Skoevde	300m Standard Rifle
Silver medal – second place	1986 Skoevde	300m Free Rifle Rifle Prone
Silver medal – second place	1990 Moscow	50m Rifle Prone
Bronze medal – third place	1986 Suhl	50m Rifle Standing
Bronze medal – third place	1987 Budapest	10m Air Rifle

Harald Stenvaag (born 5 March 1953) is a Norwegian rifle shooter who started competing internationally at the ISSF World Shooting Championships in Switzerland in 1974. He has represented Norway in the Summer Olympics 6 times, and has two Olympic medals. He has a total of 67 international medals in the Olympics, World Shooting Championships and the European Shooting Championships in his career. He was born in Ålesund.

He is running his own shooting business called Stenvaag våpensenter as in Asker outside of Oslo.

== Olympic results ==
Event	1984	1988	1992	1996	2000	2004
50 metre rifle three positions	14th 1145	7th 1173+98.7	5th 1166+98.6	41st 1153	(bronze) Bronze; 1175+93.6	30th 1149
50 metre rifle prone	17th 591	—	(silver) Silver; 597+104.4	30th 592	13th 594	16th 592
10 metre air rifle	7th 582	5th 591+101.0	18th 587	—	—	—

== Records ==
Current world records held in 300 metre rifle prone
Men	Individual	600	Harald Stenvaag (NOR); Bernd Rücker (GER); Josselin Henry (FRA); Vebjørn Berg (NOR); Stefan Raser (AUT); Remi Moreno Flores (FRA); Karl Olsson (SWE)	15 August 1990; 31 July 1994; 5 August 2010; 5 August 2010; 27 July 2015; 23 September 2019; 23 September 2019	Moscow (URS); Tolmezzo (ITA); Munich (GER); Munich (GER); Maribor (SLO); Tolmezzo (ITA); Tolmezzo (ITA)
