= Juha Hirvi =

Finnish sport shooter

Medal record

Men's shooting

Representing Finland

Olympic Games
Silver medal – second place	2000 Sydney	50 m rifle 3 pos

ISSF World Shooting Championships
Silver medal – second place	1986 Suhl	50 m rifle kneeling
Silver medal – second place	1998 Barcelona	50 m rifle prone

Juha Hirvi (born 25 March 1960 in Kymi) is a Finnish sport shooter. He won the silver medal in men's 50 metre rifle three positions at the 2000 Summer Olympics. He has also won two silver medals in ISSF World Shooting Championships. He was the flag-bearer for Finland at the 2008 Beijing Summer Olympics opening ceremony.

Juha Hirvi made Finnish Olympic history in 2008 when he participated in his sixth Olympic Games, which is a record among Finnish athletes. He holds the record with other 2008 participant, dressage rider Kyra Kyrklund and three winter Olympians: cross country skiers Marja-Liisa Kirvesniemi and Harri Kirvesniemi and ice hockey player Raimo Helminen. Juha Hirvi's manager is Finnish Sport Management Agency SportElite.

Olympic results
Event	1988	1992	1996	2000	2004	2008
50 metre rifle three positions	17th 1167	4th 1172+92.8	13th 1164	(silver) Silver; 1171+99.5	15th 1160	12th 1168
50 metre rifle prone	24th 594	6th 597+102.5	42nd 589	25th 592	9th 594	7th 595+103.5
10 metre air rifle	17th 587	27th 584	15th 589	18th 588	45th 580	—

== See also ==
- List of athletes with the most appearances at Olympic Games
