= Artur Ayvazyan =

Ukrainian sports shooter

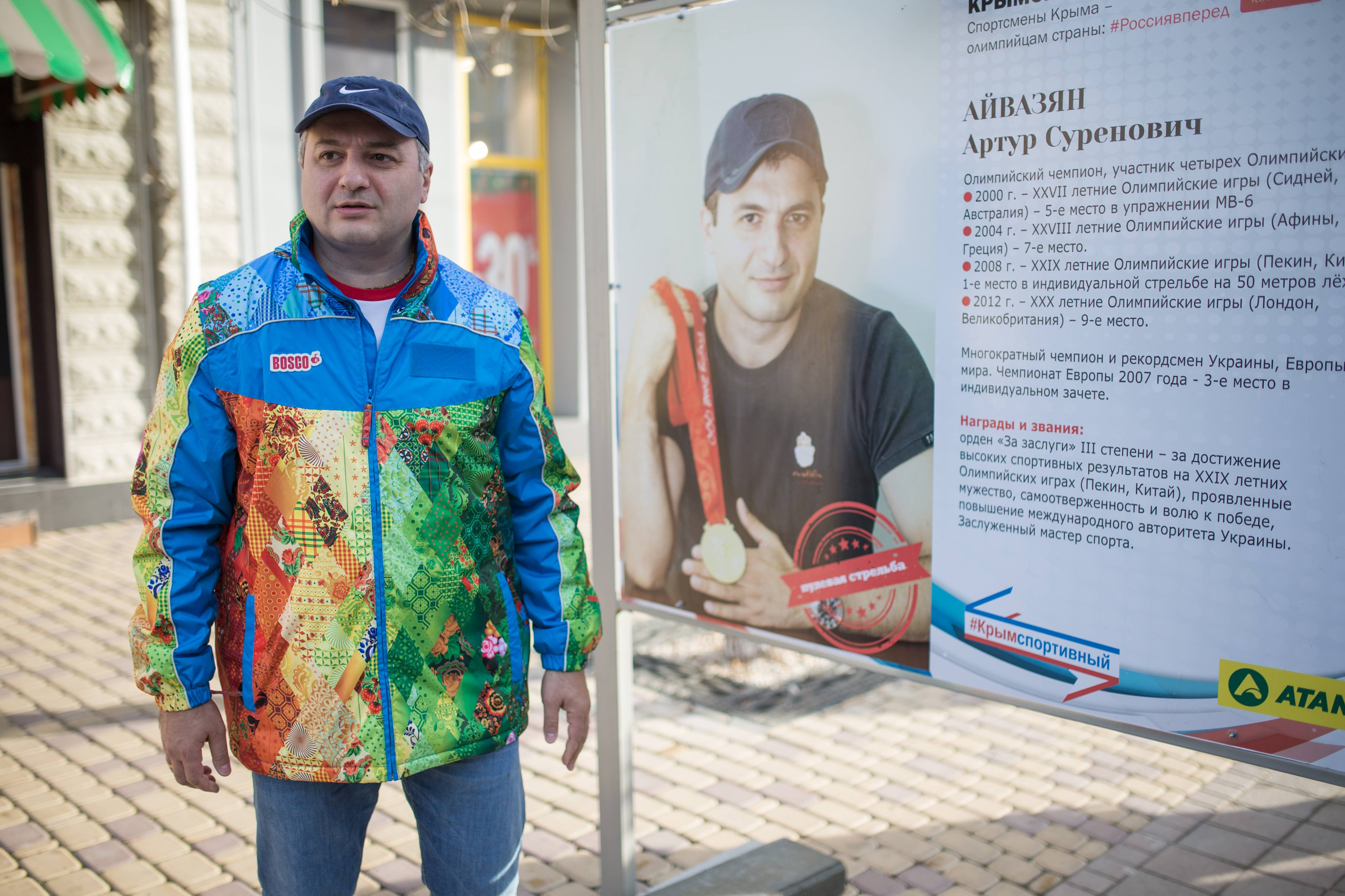

Personal information
- Born: 14 January 1973 (age 53) Yerevan, Armenian SSR, Soviet Union
- Height: 1.77 m (5 ft 9 1/2 in)
- Weight: 82 kg (181 lb)

Sport
- Country: Ukraine (until 2014), Russia (since 2014)
- Sport: Sport shooting
Medal record
Representing Ukraine
Olympic Games
| Gold medal – first place | 2008 Beijing | 50 m rifle prone |
ISSF World Shooting Championships
| Gold medal – first place | 1998 Barcelona | 50 m rifle prone, Team |
| Gold medal – first place | 1998 Barcelona | 50 m rifle three positions, Team |
| Silver medal – second place | 1994 Milan | 50 m rifle three positions, Team |
| Silver medal – second place | 2002 Lahti | 50 m rifle prone, Team |
| Bronze medal – third place | 2002 Lahti | 50 m rifle three positions, Team |
| Bronze medal – third place | 2010 Munich | 50 m rifle three positions, Team |
European Shooting Championships
| Gold medal – first place | 1999 Bordeaux | 50 m rifle three positions, Team |
| Gold medal – first place | 1999 Bordeaux | 50 m rifle prone, Team |
| Gold medal – first place | 2001 Zagreb | 50 m rifle three positions |
| Silver medal – second place | 2003 Plzeň | 50 m rifle prone |
| Bronze medal – third place | 1993 Brno | 50 m rifle three positions (Junior) |
| Bronze medal – third place | 1999 Bordeaux | 50 m rifle three positions |
| Bronze medal – third place | 2005 Plzeň | 50 m rifle prone |
- Updated on 11 October 2012

Artur Surenovych Ayvazyan (Armenian: Արթուր Այվազյան; Ukrainian: Артур Суренович Айвазян, born 14 January 1973) is an Olympic shooter for Ukraine and Russia who won a gold medal in the 50 metre rifle prone event at the 2008 Summer Olympics in Beijing.

Born in Armenia, Ayvazyan took up shooting in 1985 and moved to Ukraine in 1990, when he competed in his first major international tournament as a junior. He won one medal as a junior, in 1993, before moving up to the senior division in 1994. He moved to Simferopol in 1997 to train with a new coach and captured his first ISSF World Cup victory the following year. As of 2012 he has participated in every edition of the Olympics since 2000 and has won six World and seven European Championship medals in individual and team events, including his junior bronze from 1993. In 2014 he began competing for Russia.

== Early life ==
Ayvazyan was born on 14 January 1973 in Yerevan, the capital of Armenia, then part of the Soviet Union. He took up sport shooting in 1985 and moved to Lviv in what is now Ukraine in 1990, after his parents were unable to pay the bribe to get him into the Armenian State Institute of Physical Culture. There he entered a local infantry school and participated in his first major international tournament, the European Junior Championships in Arnhem, Netherlands, where he placed 4th in the 10 metre air rifle event. He next appeared at the European Junior Championships 1993 in Brno, Czech Republic, where he won a bronze medal in the 50 metre rifle three positions competition and finished eighth in both the 10 metre air rifle and the 50 metre rifle prone categories.

== International career ==
Ayvazyan entered his first senior European Shooting Championship in 1994, in Strasbourg, France, placing 26th in the 10 metre air rifle division. He also participated in the World Championships for the first time, in Milan, Italy, with a best placing of 12th in the 50 metre rifle three positions competition among four events. He finished with double digits rankings over the next three years of European Championships before finding a new coach and moving to Simferopol in 1997. His results improved in 1998 and he earned his first ISSF World Cup victory and placed fourth in the World Championships in Barcelona, Spain and the World Cup Final, all in the 50 metre rifle three positions category. He continued his success in the discipline by winning a bronze medal at the 1999 European Shooting Championships in Bordeaux, France and then participated in the 2000 Summer Olympics, where he finished 5th, 8th, and 30th in the 50 metre rifle three positions, 10 metre air rifle, and 50 metre rifle prone divisions respectively.

Ayvazyan first reached the podium at a World Cup Final in 2001, finishing third in the 50 metre rifle three positions event. It was the first and, as of 2012, only year that he received an individual European Championship crown, after winning in the same discipline at the tournament in Zagreb, Croatia. He won a silver medal at the 2003 European Championships in the 50 metre rifle prone competition in Plzeň, Czech Republic in the lead up to the 2004 Summer Olympics, where he placed 7th, 9th, and 22nd in the 50 metre rifle three positions, 50 metre rifle prone, and 10 metre air rifle categories respectively. In 2005 he won a bronze medal at the European Championships held in Belgrade, Serbia in the 50 metre rifle prone division.

In 2008, upon returning from a World Cup event in Munich, Germany, Ayvazyan was detained by Ukrainian customs for having an unregistered gun and was placed under suspicion of weapons smuggling. Half of the team was called in for questioning and, after going through two courts and losing significant training time during their final preparations for the 2008 Summer Olympics, it was eventually determined that the guns were all legally registered and that the evidence suggesting otherwise was planted in an attempt to discredit the head coach. At the Games, Ayvazyan won the gold medal in the 50 metre rifle prone event, in addition to finishing 19th and 21st in the 50 metre rifle three positions and 10 metre air rifle competitions respectively. His Olympic victory not his only podium finish that year: he won his fifth, and as of 2012 most recent, World Cup event in the 50 metre rifle three positions discipline and placed second in the division at the World Cup Final, his highest ranking in the tournament as of 2012.

Ayvazyan won a silver medal in the 10 metre air rifle category at a 2009 World Cup event the last time, as of 2012, that he finished on the podium as an individual at a major international tournament. He competed at the 2012 Summer Olympics, finishing 10th, 19th, and 21st in the 50 metre rifle three positions, 10 metre air rifle, and 50 metre rifle prone disciplines respectively. It was the first time in his four appearances that he had failed to make the final of any Olympic competition. As of 2012 he has thirteen individual World Cup podium finishes, five of which are first-place rankings, and four individual World Cup Final medals. In team events he has been World Champion in 1998, runner-up in 1998, and bronze medalist in 2002 and 2010 in the 50 metre rifle three positions category and World Champion in 1994 and runner-up in 2002 in the 50 metre rifle prone competition. He was also European Champion in both divisions in 1999. Living in Crimea, he took up Russian citizenship in 2014, after Russia occupied the peninsula, and began competing internationally for that country.

== Olympic results ==
Olympic results
| Event | 2000 | 2004 | 2008 | 2012 |
|---|---|---|---|---|
| 50 metre rifle three positions | 5th 1170+96.6 | 7th 1166+95.0 | 19th 1165 | 10th 1168 |
| 50 metre rifle prone | 30th 591 | 9th 594 | (gold) Gold; 599+103.7 | 21st 593 |
| 10 metre air rifle | 8th 592+100.0 | 22nd 591 | 21st 592 | 19th 593 |
