= Georgios Petsanis =

Greek sport shooter

Personal information
- Full name: Georgios Petsanis
- Nationality: Greece
- Born: 16 April 1984 (age 42) Drama, Greece
- Height: 1.73 m (5 ft 8 in)
- Weight: 70 kg (154 lb)

Sport
- Sport: Shooting
- Event: 10 m air rifle (AR60)
- Club: Shooting Club of Drama
- Coached by: Panagiotis Emvoliadis

Georgios Petsanis (Greek: Γεώργιος Πετσάνης; born April 16, 1984, in Drama) is a Greek sport shooter. He was selected as one of eleven shooters to represent the host nation Greece at the 2004 Summer Olympics in Athens, and had attained a top five finish as a junior in rifle shooting at the European Championships in Győr, Hungary on that same year. Petsanis trains at the Shooting Club of Drama under his longtime coach Panagiotis Emvoliadis.

Petsanis was named as part of the host nation's shooting team to compete in the men's 10 m air rifle at the 2004 Summer Olympics in Athens. He had registered a minimum qualifying score of 592 from his fifth-place feat at the European Championships to fill in one of the Olympic berths reserved to the host nation, after the Hellenic Shooting Federation decided to exchange spots in his pet event with the unused quotas from the men's air and rapid fire pistol. Amassing a mighty roar from the crowd, Petsanis shot a marvelous 593 out of a possible 600 to tie for twelfth place with five other marksmen in the qualifying round, but fell short to reach the Olympic final by just a single point.
