= Michael Babb =

British sport shooter (born 1963)

Personal information
- Full name: Michael Babb
- Nationality: Great Britain
- Born: 14 October 1963 (age 62) Farnborough, Kent, England
- Height: 1.73 m (5 ft 8 in)
- Weight: 125 kg (276 lb)

Sport
- Sport: Shooting
- Event: 50 m rifle prone (FR60PR)
- Club: Appleton Rifle Club
- Coached by: Kimmo Yli-Jaskari
Medal record
Men's shooting
Representing England
Commonwealth Games
Silver medal – second place	2002 Manchester	FR60PR
Gold medal – first place	2006 Melbourne	FR60PR Pairs
Silver medal – second place	2006 Melbourne	FR60PR
Silver medal – second place	2010 Delhi	FR60PR Pairs
Representing Great Britain
European Championships
Silver medal – second place	1999 Bordeaux	FR60PR

Michael Babb (born 14 October 1963 in Farnborough, Kent) is a British sport shooter. He has competed for Team GB in small-bore rifle prone at two Olympics (2000 and 2004), and has been close to an Olympic medal in 2004, finishing in seventh position. Apart from his Olympic career, Babb has won a total of seven medals in a major international competition, including two silvers at the Commonwealth Games (2002 and 2006). Throughout his sporting career, Babb trains full-time under assistant head coach Kimmo Yli-Jaskari of the national team, while he shoots at Appleton Rifle Club in Warrington.

Babb began shooting small-bore rifle at the age of 14, and quickly progressed to the British Junior Training Squad that culminated him in a runner-up finish at the European Championships in 1983. As medals and records followed, Babb attained a reserve position for the 1984 Summer Olympics in Los Angeles, but his marksmanship prominence did not occur until 1999, when he won a silver in rifle prone at the European Championships in Bordeaux, France. This result earned him an Olympic place for Team GB on his debut at Sydney 2000, where he failed to qualify for the final in the 50 m rifle prone, after finishing in a five-way tie for twenty-fifth place with 592 points.

In 2002, Babb was able to back up his feat from the Olympics when England hosted the Commonwealth Games at Manchester. There, he pocketed a silver medal in his signature event with a score of 699.0, losing the title to Australia's Timothy Lowndes by less than a point. Babb also teamed up with Neil Day to dominate the field in the rifle prone pairs, recording a first-place combined score at 1189 points. On that same season, Babb won his first ever individual gold at the ISSF World Cup meet in Milan, Italy with a brilliant 700.7, securing him an Olympic berth for Britain at his second Games.

At the 2004 Summer Olympics in Athens, Babb qualified for his second British team in the men's 50 m rifle prone. Clearly an Olympic medal hopeful, Babb shot 595 out of a possible 600 to grab the sixth seed from the prelims, before ruling out of his contention to seventh in the eight-man final round with 101.8 points for a total of 696.8.

Shortly after the Olympics, Babb won a silver medal in the rifle prone at the 2006 Commonwealth Games in Melbourne with a score of 696.2, repeating his effort at Manchester four years earlier. With Chris Hector, he won Gold in the Men's Prone Pairs.

Babb won a silver medal at the 2010 Commonwealth Games in Delhi in the Men's 50m rifle prone pairs event alongside Richard Wilson.
