= Artyom Khadjibekov =

Russian sport shooter (born 1970)

Medal record

Men's shooting

Representing Russia

Olympic Games
Gold medal – first place	1996 Atlanta	10 m air rifle
Silver medal – second place	2000 Sydney	10 m air rifle

World Championships
Gold medal – first place	1998 Barcelona	10 m air rifle
Gold medal – first place	2006 Zagreb	50 m rifle 3 pos

Artyom Aleksandrovich Khadjibekov (Russian: Артём Александрович Хаджибеков; born April 20, 1970, in Obninsk) is a Russian sport shooter, specializing in the rifles event. He won the gold medal at the 1996 Olympic Games and silver medal at the 2000 Olympic Games in the 10 metre air rifle event. He also competed at 2004, 2008 and 2012 Olympic Games.

== Olympic results ==
Event	1996	2000	2004	2008	2012
50 metre rifle three positions	13th 1164	4th 1173+95.2	5th 1164+97.6	14th 1167	16th 1165
50 metre rifle prone	20th 594	6th 597+102.2+10.6	9th 594	13th 594	12th 595
10 metre air rifle	(gold) Gold; 594+101.7	(silver) Silver; 592+103.1	24th 590	—	—

== Records ==
Khadjibekov was part of the Soviet team that formerly held the world record in the 50 meter rifle three positions junior event.
