= Sven Haglund =

Swedish sport shooter

Personal information
- Full name: Sven Anders Fredrik Haglund
- Nationality: Sweden
- Born: 13 January 1980 (age 46) Trollhättan, Sweden
- Height: 1.90 m (6 ft 3 in)
- Weight: 78 kg (172 lb)

Sport
- Sport: Shooting
- Event(s): 10 m air rifle (AR60); 50 m rifle prone (FR60PR); 50 m rifle 3 positions (FR3X40)
- Club: Trollhättans Sportskytte
- Coached by: Stefan Lindblom

Sven Anders Fredrik Haglund (born January 13, 1980, in Trollhättan) is a Swedish sport shooter. He has been selected to compete for Sweden in rifle shooting at the 2004 Summer Olympics, and has attained numerous top ten finishes in a major international competition, spanning the ISSF World Cup series and the European Championships. Haglund trains under head coach Stefan Lindblom for the national team, while shooting at Trollhättans Sportskytte.

Haglund qualified for the Swedish team in rifle shooting at the 2004 Summer Olympics in Athens. He managed to get a minimum qualifying score of 1168 in the rifle three positions to gain an Olympic quota place for Sweden, following his fourth-place finish at the ISSF World Cup meet in Fort Benning, Georgia, United States a year earlier. In the 10 m air rifle, Haglund shot a steady 589 out of a possible 600 to tie for twenty-ninth with three other shooters. Haglund also marked a total score of 1142 points (393 in prone, 372 in standing, and 377 in the kneeling) in his signature event, 50 m rifle 3 positions, finishing haplessly in a lowly thirty-fifth position out of forty shooters.
