= Christian Planer =

Austrian sports shooter (born 1975)

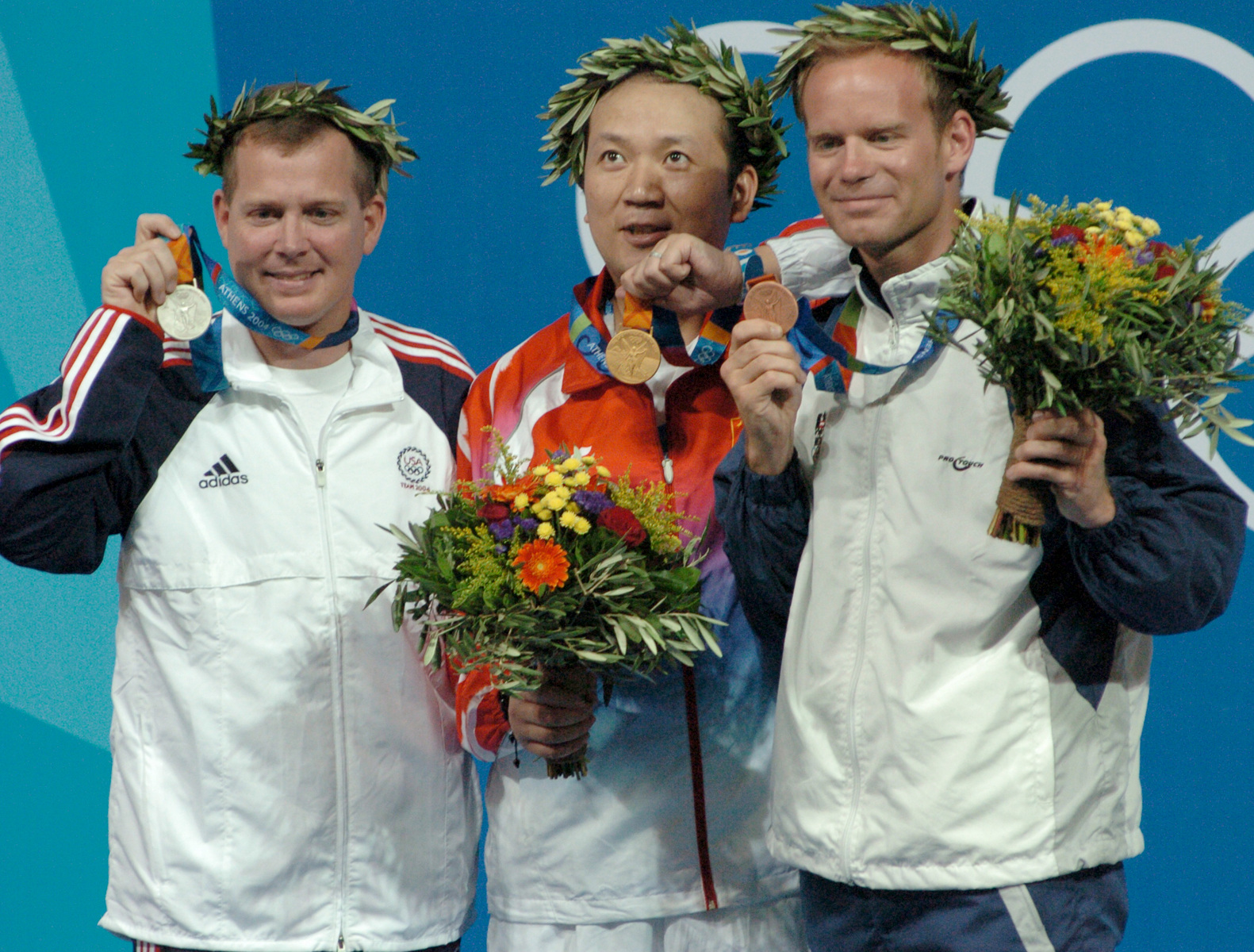
- Michael Anti, Zhanbo Jia and Christian Planer at the 2004 Olympics

Personal information
- Born: 15 May 1975 (age 51) Kufstein, Austria
- Height: 1.83 m (6 ft 0 in)
- Weight: 80 kg (176 lb)

Sport
- Sport: Shooting
- Club: Sportgemeinschaft Bruckhäusl; Sportgemeinschaft Kössen; SG Walchsee
Medal record
Representing Austria
Olympic Games
Bronze medal – third place	2004 Athens	50 m rifle three positions

Christian Planer (born 15 May 1975) is an Austrian sports shooter. He competed at the 2004, 2008 and 2012 Olympics in two individual events, 10 m air rifle and 50 m small-bore rifle, and won a bronze medal in the small-bore rifle in 2004.

== Records ==
Current world records held in 50 metre rifle three positions
Men's	Teams	3549	Norway (Claussen, Larsen, Hegg)	May 29, 2021	Osijek (CRO)
