= Michael Anti (sport shooter) =

American sport shooter

Mike Anti
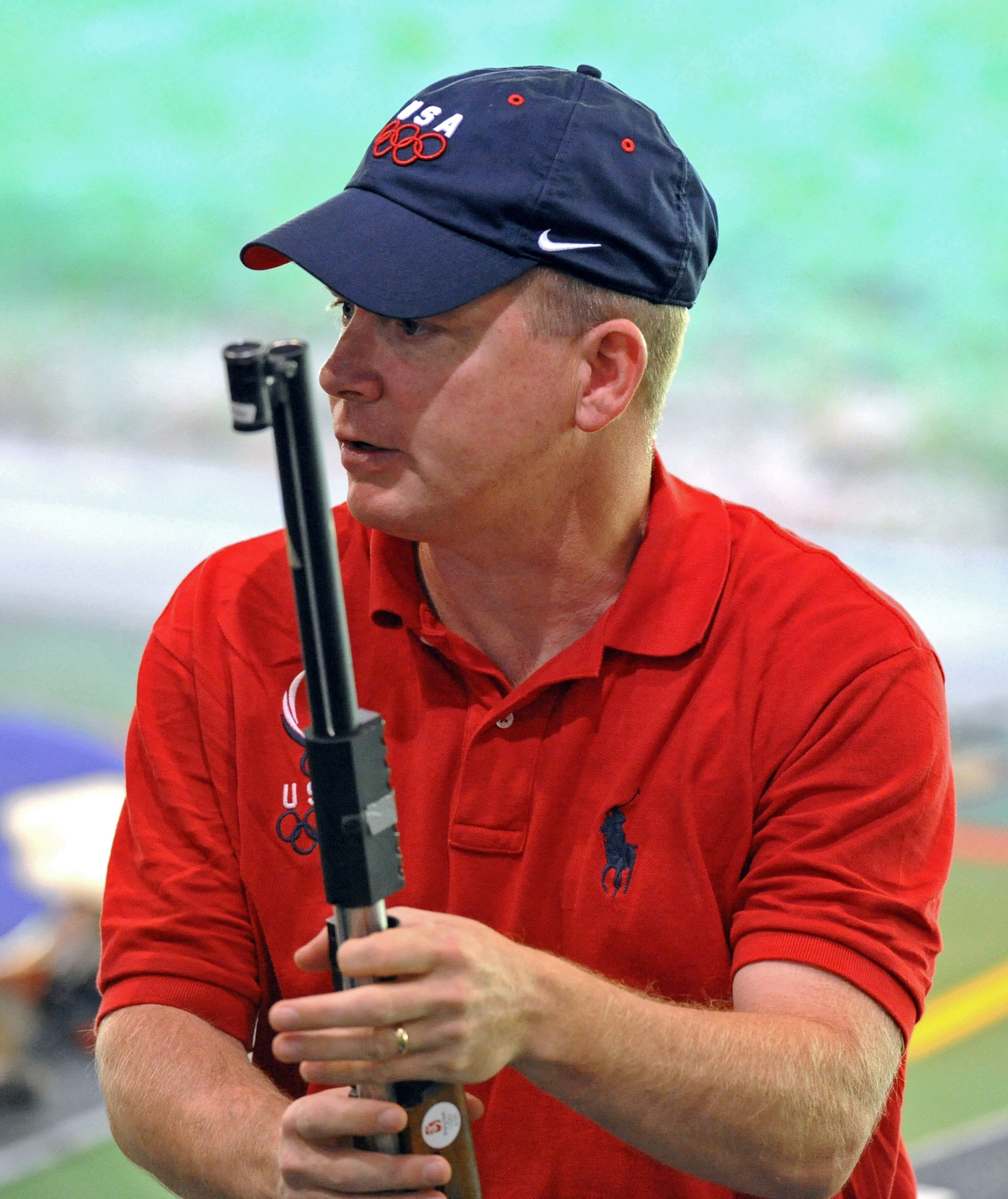
- Mike Anti at the Beijing Shooting Range Hall in 2008

Personal information
- Born: Michael E. Anti; August 2, 1964 (age 61) Orange, California, U.S.

Sport
- Sport: Shooting
- Club: U.S. Army WCAP
- Coached by: Ed Etzel
Medal record
Representing United States
Olympic Games
| Silver medal – second place | 2004 Athens | 50 m rifle 3 pos |

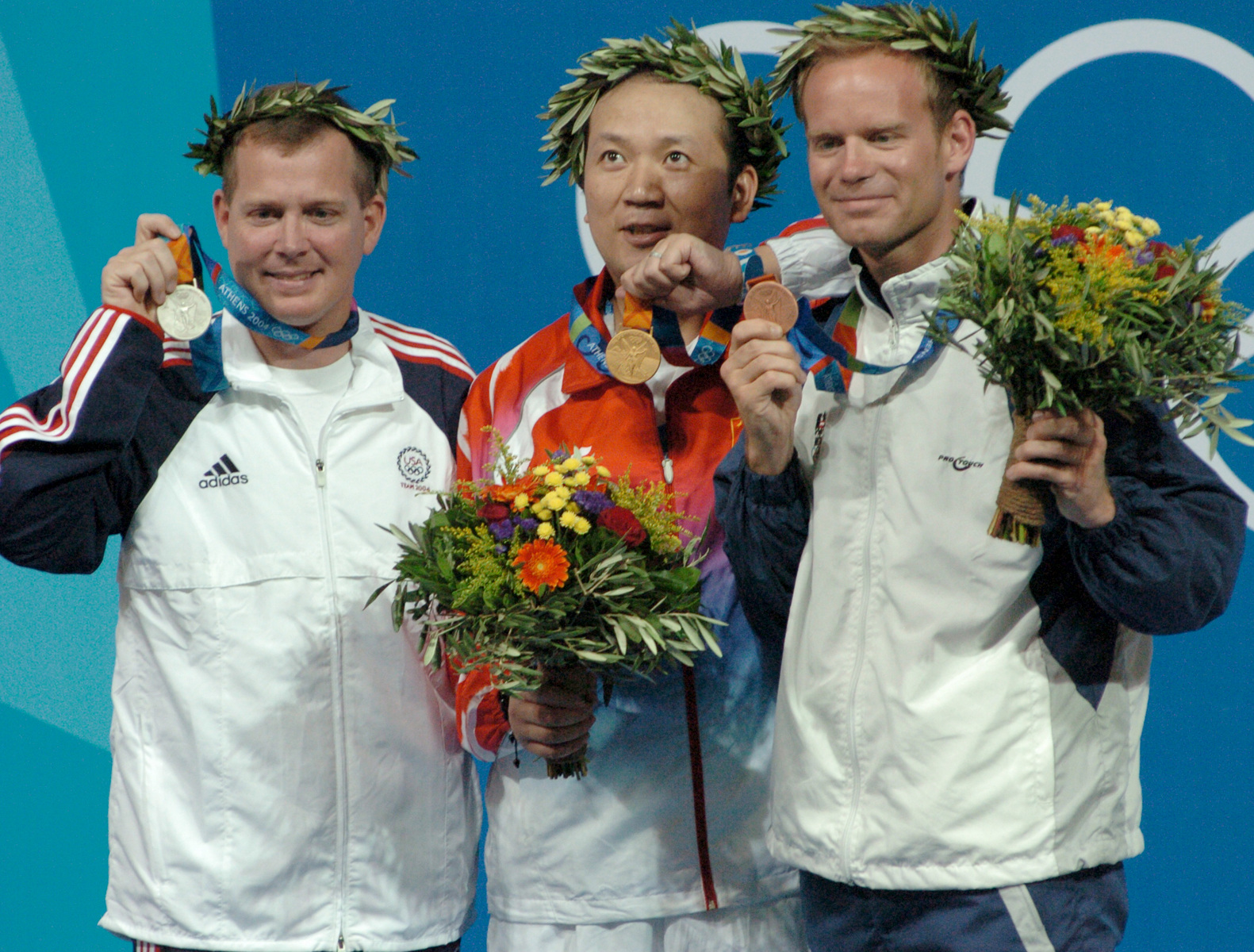
Michael Anti (left) poses with Jia Zhanbo (center) and Christian Planer (right) at the three position rifle award ceremony on August 22, 2004.

Michael E. Anti (born August 2, 1964) is an American sport shooter, a former Major in the U.S. Army, and a marksman in the U.S. Army World Class Athlete Program. He competed at the 1992, 2000, 2004 and 2008 Olympics in 50 m small-bore rifle events and won a silver medal in the three positions event in 2004. In 2009 he became assistant rifle coach at the United States Air Force Academy. In 2017 he became the head coach at the United States Naval Academy.

Olympic results
| Event | 1992 | 1996 | 2000 | 2004 | 2008 |
|---|---|---|---|---|---|
| 50 metre rifle three positions | — | — | 9th 1164 | (silver) Silver; 1165+98.1 | — |
| 50 metre rifle prone | 18th 594 | — | — | 24th 591 | 9th 594 |
