= Espen Berg-Knutsen =

Norwegian sports shooter (born 1969)

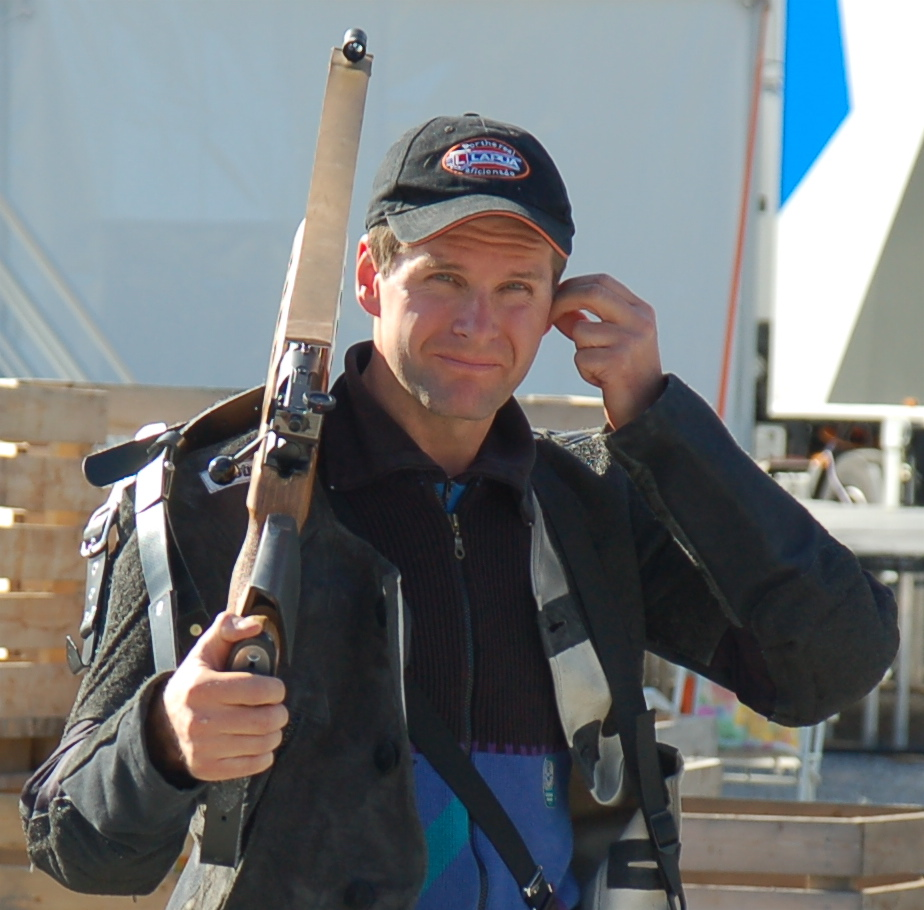

Personal information
- Nationality: Norway
- Born: 2 October 1969 (age 56) Oslo, Norway
- Height: 1.86 m (6 ft 1 in)
- Weight: 80 kg (176 lb)

Sport
- Sport: Shooting
- Event(s): 10 m air rifle (AR40); 50 m rifle prone (FR60PR); 50 m rifle 3 positions (STR3X20)
- Club: Nordstrand SSK
Medal record
Men's shooting
Representing Norway
World Championships
Gold medal – first place	1998 Zaragoza	300STR3X20
Gold medal – first place	2006 Zagreb	300FR3X40
Bronze medal – third place	2002 Lahti	FR60PR

Espen Berg-Knutsen (born 2 October 1969 in Oslo) is a Norwegian sport shooter. He is also a three-time Olympian, two-time World champion, and world-record holder for the 300 m rifle three positions.

== Shooting career ==
Since his sporting career began in 1982, Berg-Knutsen is considered one of Norway's most prominent sport shooters, having achieved numerous successes in rifle shooting events at the ISSF World Championships, ISSF World Cup, and European Championships. He had also won a total of three medals at the ISSF World Championships, including two golds (1998 in Zaragoza, Spain, and 2006 in Zagreb, Croatia). One of the highlights of his career occurred at the 2006 ISSF World Shooting Championships, when he set a new world record of 1,181 points in the 300 m rifle three positions. Berg-Knutsen also competed for all rifle shooting events at the 2000 Summer Olympics in Sydney, and 2004 Summer Olympics in Athens, but he neither reached the final round, nor claimed an Olympic medal.

Eight years after competing in his first Olympics, Berg-Knutsen qualified for his third Norwegian team as a 39-year-old at the 2008 Summer Olympics in Beijing by winning the gold medal for the rifle three positions from the World Championships. Unlike his previous Olympic games, he competed only for two rifle shooting events, 50 m rifle prone (FR60PR) and 50 m rifle 3 positions (STR3X20).

In his first event, 50 m rifle prone, Berg-Knutsen was able to hit a total of 594 points within six attempts, finishing eleventh in the qualifying rounds. Few days later, Berg-Knutsen competed for the 50 m rifle 3 positions, where he was able to shoot 396 targets in a prone position, 374 in standing, and 390 in kneeling, for a total score of 1,160 points, finishing abruptly in thirtieth place.

== Olympic results ==
Event	2000	2004	2008
50 metre rifle three positions	12th 1162	22nd 1156	30th 1160
50 metre rifle prone	19th 593	16th 592	11th 594
10 metre air rifle	34th 585	41st 584	—
