= Nedžad Fazlija =

Bosnian sports shooter (born 1968)

Personal information
- Nationality: Bosniak
- Born: 25 February 1968 (age 58) Foča, SR Bosnia and Herzegovina, SFR Yugoslavia
- Height: 1.75 m (5 ft 9 in)
- Weight: 70 kg (154 lb)

Sport
- Country: Bosnia and Herzegovina
- Sport: Shooting
- Events: 10m Air Rifle; 50m Rifle Prone; 50m Rifle 3 Positions
- Coached by: Amir Dautović
- Updated on 21 July 2012

Nedžad Fazlija (born 25 February 1968) is a Bosnian-Herzegovinian retired Olympic sports shooter.

Fazlija was a part of the Bosnian Olympic team at the 1996 Summer Olympics, 2000 Summer Olympics, 2004 Summer Olympics, 2008 Summer Olympics and 2012 Summer Olympics. He has reached one Olympic air rifle final, where he finished sixth. As of 2020, this is still the best Olympic shooting ranking for Bosnia and Herzegovina, and until the 2020 Summer Olympics it was the country's best Olympic ranking in any sport.

== Achievements ==
Olympic results
Event	1996	2000	2004	2008	2012
10 metre air rifle	25th 586	6th 591+101.7	35th 587	35th 588	44th 585
50 metre rifle prone	51st 583	34th 590	44th 585	45th 586	45th 587
50 metre rifle three positions	18th 1162	41st 1132	33rd 1144	43rd 1148	38th 1149

Olympic Games
Preceded by Elvir Krehmić	Flagbearer for Bosnia and Herzegovina; Athens 2004	Succeeded by Amel Mekić
