= Pablo Álvarez (sport shooter) =

Argentine sports shooter (born 1978)

Personal information
- Full name: Pablo Damián Álvarez
- Nationality: Argentina
- Born: 20 April 1978 (age 48) Chivilcoy, Argentina
- Height: 1.80 m (5 ft 11 in)
- Weight: 85 kg (187 lb)

Sport
- Sport: Shooting
- Events: 10 m air rifle (AR60); 50 m rifle prone (FR60PR); 50 m rifle 3 positions (FR3X40)
- Club: General Jose de San Martin
- Coached by: Ruben Giannone
Medal record
Men's shooting
Representing Argentina
Pan American Games
Silver medal – second place	1999 Winnipeg	FR3X40
Bronze medal – third place	2003 Santo Domingo	FR3X40

Pablo Damián Álvarez (born 20 April 1978 in Chivilcoy) is an Argentine sport shooter. He produced a career tally of two medals (one silver and one bronze) at the 1999 and 2003 Pan American Games, and was selected to compete for Argentina in two editions of the Olympic Games (2000 and 2004). Having started shooting at the age of ten, Alvarez also serves as a full-time member of General Jose de San Martin Shooting Club in his native Chivilcoy, under his personal coach Ruben Giannone.

Alvarez' Olympic debut came as a 22-year-old at the 2000 Summer Olympics in Sydney, where he shared a 31st place tie with three other shooters in the air rifle, finished 49th in the rifle prone, and rounded out his program to 33rd in the rifle three positions, accumulating total scores of 586, 582, and 1,150 points respectively.

At the 2004 Summer Olympics in Athens, Alvarez qualified for his second Argentine squad in rifle shooting, by having attained a mandatory minimum Olympic standard of 1,142, and having secured a berth in the rifle three positions from the 2003 Pan American Games in Santo Domingo, Dominican Republic. In the 10 m air rifle, Alvarez shot 583 out of 600 to finish 43rd in a field of 47 shooters, betraying Mexico's Roberto José Elias by a close, one-point gap. Four days later, in the 50 m rifle prone, Alvarez aggregated four more points than his previous event to share a 40th overall position with Dutch shooter Dick Boschman, posting a total score of 587. In his third and last event, 50 m rifle 3 positions, Alvarez fired 394 in the prone position, 360 in the standing, and 381 in the kneeling to accumulate an overall record of 1,135 points, leaving him in 38th place along with host nation Greece's Evangelos Liogris.
