= Jia Zhanbo =

Chinese sports shooter (born 1974)

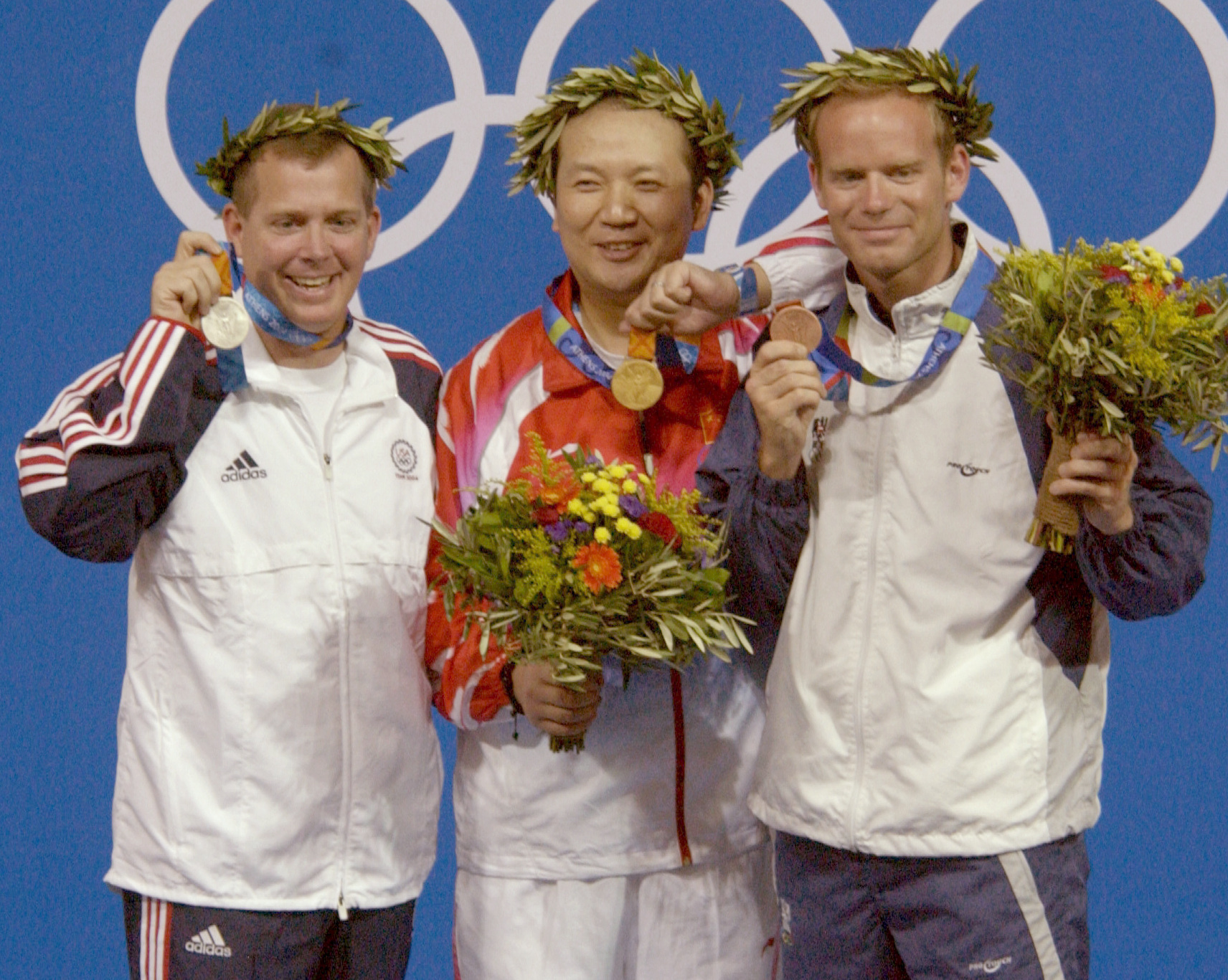
- Michael Anti, Zhanbo Jia and Christian Planer at the 2004 Olympics

Personal information
- Born: 15 March 1974 (age 52) Xinyang, Henan, China
- Height: 1.76 m (5 ft 9 in)
- Weight: 81 kg (179 lb)

Sport
- Sport: Shooting
- Club: Henan
Medal record
Men's shooting
Representing China
Olympic Games
Gold medal – first place	2004 Athens	50 m rifle 3 positions
Asian Championships
Gold medal – first place	2007 Kuwait City	50 m rifle prone
Gold medal – first place	2007 Kuwait City	50 m rifle prone team
Gold medal – first place	2007 Kuwait City	50 m rifle 3 positions
Gold medal – first place	2007 Kuwait City	50 m rifle 3 positions team

Jia Zhanbo (simplified Chinese: 贾占波; traditional Chinese: 賈占波; pinyin: Jiǎ Zhānbō; born 15 March 1974) is a Chinese sports shooter. He competed at the 2004 and 2008 Olympics in two 50 m small-bore rifle events, prone and three positions, and won the three positions event in 2004.
