= Roberto José Elias =

Mexican sports shooter (born 1976)

Personal information
- Full name: Roberto José Elías Orozco
- Nationality: Mexico
- Born: 6 November 1976 (age 49) León, Guanajuato, Mexico
- Height: 1.85 m (6 ft 1 in)
- Weight: 76 kg (168 lb)

Sport
- Sport: Shooting
- Event(s): 10 m air rifle (AR60); 50 m rifle prone (FR60PR); 50 m rifle 3 positions (STR3X20)
- Club: Cinegetico del Bavio
- Coached by: Alessandro Elias (father)
Medal record
Men's shooting
Representing Mexico
Pan American Games
Bronze medal – third place	1999 Winnipeg	STR3X20
Bronze medal – third place	2007 Rio de Janeiro	AR60

Roberto José Elías Orozco (born November 6, 1976, in León, Guanajuato) is a Mexican sport shooter. He won two bronze medals in both air and small-bore rifle at the 1999 Pan American Games in Winnipeg, Manitoba, Canada, and at the 2007 Pan American Games in Rio de Janeiro, Brazil, accumulating scores of 1,223.4 and 690.9 points, respectively. Elias also competed for his respective shooting events at the 2000 Summer Olympics in Sydney, and at the 2004 Summer Olympics in Athens, but he neither reached the final round, nor claimed an Olympic medal.

Eight years after competing in his first Olympics, Elias qualified for his third Mexican team, as a 31-year-old, at the 2008 Summer Olympics in Beijing, by obtaining a gold medal in the air rifle from the 2005 Championships of the Americas in Salinas, California. He scored a total of 590 targets in the men's 10 m air rifle, by one point ahead of South Korea's Han Jin-Seop from the final attempt, finishing only in twenty-fifth place.

== Olympic results ==
Event	2000	2004	2008
50 metre rifle three positions	39th 1140	36th 1137	—
50 metre rifle prone	41st 587	—	—
10 metre air rifle	38th 583	44th 582	25th 590
