= Sergei Kovalenko (sport shooter) =

Russian sport shooter

Sergey Anatolyevich Kovalenko (Russian: Сергей Анатольевич Коваленко; born 5 February 1970 in Lutsk, Ukraine SSR, Soviet Union) is a Russian rifle shooter. He competed in the 50 m rifle prone event at the 2012 Summer Olympics, where he placed 19th.
