= Markopoulo Olympic Shooting Centre =

Olympic venue in Athens, Greece

Coordinates: 37°52′15″N 23°54′25″E

The Markopoulo Olympic Shooting Centre was the site of the shooting events at the 2004 Summer Olympics in Athens, Greece. The venue is located in Markópoulo, on the outskirts of the eastern suburbs of Athens. It has a seating capacity of 4,000, though a public capacity of only 2,330 for the Olympics. The venue was completed in March, 2004 and officially opened on August 2, 2004, shortly before the beginning of the Olympics.

The facility is now in the process of being converted to the official shooting range and training center of the Hellenic Police.
