= Jonas Edman =

Swedish sport shooter

Olympic medal record

Men's shooting
Gold medal – first place	2000 Sydney	50 m rifle prone

Jonas Edman (born 4 March 1967 in Linköping) is a Swedish rifle shooter, specializing in the Prone position. He was a 300 m Rifle specialist during most of the 1990s and a part of the winning team at the 1998 ISSF World Shooting Championships in Zaragoza, Spain. After this however, he started to focus in the Olympic 50 m Rifle. He got a very late wild card to the 2000 Olympics and performed 599, only one point from the maximum (and World record) result, in the qualification round, and managed to keep his lead during the final.

Edman also won the 2001 ISSF World Cup Final in Munich after the same score, 599. His results after this have been varying, but he has continued to be one of the best Prone shooters in the world. He currently owns a company that sells shooting equipment, and has also occasionally helped the Swedish biathlon team with shooting issues.

Olympic results
Event	2000	2004
50 metre rifle three positions	20th 1159	—
50 metre rifle prone	(gold) Gold; 599+102.3	32nd 590
