= Václav Bečvář =

Czech sport shooter (born 1957)

Václav Bečvář (born 5 July 1957 in Chomutov) is a Czech sport shooter who competed in the 1996 Summer Olympics, in the 2000 Summer Olympics, and in the 2004 Summer Olympics.
