= Maik Eckhardt =

German sport shooter (born 1970)

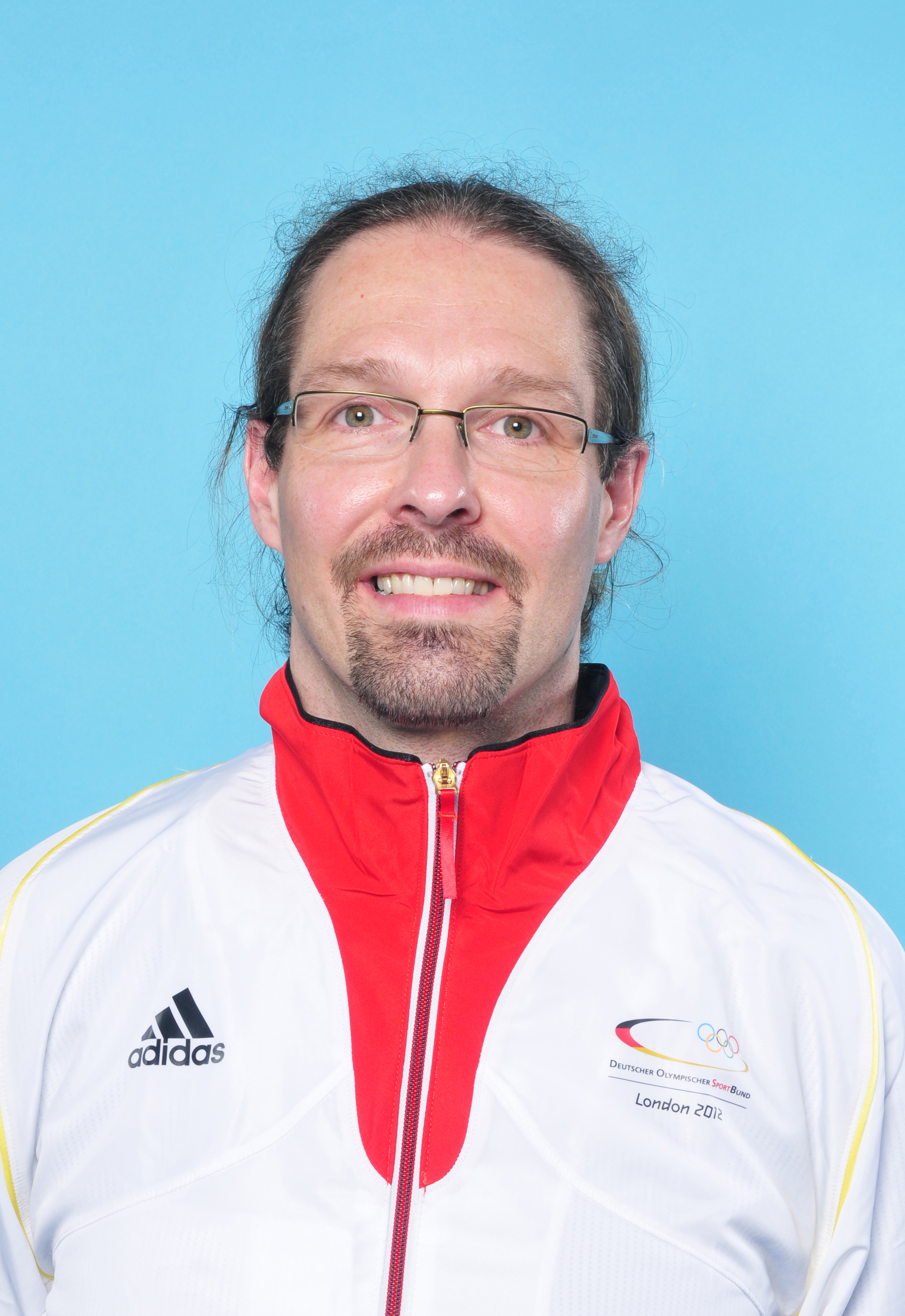
Maik Eckhardt 2012

Maik Eckhardt (born 4 June 1970 in Bad Berleburg) is a German sport shooter who competed in the 1996 Summer Olympics, in the 2000 Summer Olympics, in the 2004 Summer Olympics, in the 2008 Summer Olympics, and in the 2012 Summer Olympics.
