= Jury Sukhorukov =

Ukrainian sport shooter

Medal record

Representing Ukraine

Men's shooting

Olympic Games
| Silver medal – second place | 2008 Beijing | Men's 50 m rifle 3 pos |

World Championships
| Silver medal – second place | 2006 Zagreb | 50m rifle prone individual |

Jury Sukhorukov (Ukraine: Юрій Сухоруков; born 29 March 1968) is an Olympic shooter from Ukraine. He won a silver medal in the Men's 50 metre rifle three positions event at the 2008 Summer Olympics in Beijing.
