= 2000 ISSF World Cup =

For the 2000 ISSF World Cup in the seventeen Olympic shooting events, the World Cup Final was held in October 2000 in Nicosia, Cyprus for the shotgun events, and in November 2000 in Munich, Germany for the rifle, pistol and running target events.

== Rifle, pistol and running target ==
=== Men's individual ===
10m Air Rifle
Stage	Venue	1st place, gold medalist(s)	2nd place, silver medalist(s)	3rd place, bronze medalist(s)
1	(Australia) Sydney	Yevgeni Aleinikov (RUS)	Leif Rolland (NOR)	Dick Boschman (NED)
2	(Italy) Milan	Wolfram Waibel Jr. (AUT)	Dick Boschman (NED)	Leif Rolland (NOR)
3	(Germany) Munich	Artyom Khadjibekov (RUS)	Jean-Pierre Amat (FRA)	Cai Yalin (CHN)
4	(United States) Atlanta	Rajmond Debevec (SLO)	Dick Boschman (NED)	Anatoli Klimenko (BLR)
Final	(Germany) Munich	Artyom Khadjibekov (RUS)	Leif Rolland (NOR)	Jean-Pierre Amat (FRA)

50m Rifle 3 Positions
Stage	Venue	1st place, gold medalist(s)	2nd place, silver medalist(s)	3rd place, bronze medalist(s)
1	(Australia) Sydney	Thomas Farnik (AUT)	Stevan Pletikosić (YUG)	Christian Bauer (GER)
2	(Italy) Milan	Artur Ayvazyan (UKR)	Oleg Mykhaylov (UKR)	Ning Lijia (CHN)
3	(Germany) Munich	Yevgeni Aleinikov (RUS)	Artur Ayvazyan (UKR)	Juha Hirvi (FIN)
4	(United States) Atlanta	Michael Anti (USA)	Ken Johnson (USA)	Rajmond Debevec (SLO)
Final	(Germany) Munich	Jozef Gönci (SVK)	Michael Anti (USA)	Yevgeni Aleinikov (RUS)

50m Rifle Prone
Stage	Venue	1st place, gold medalist(s)	2nd place, silver medalist(s)	3rd place, bronze medalist(s)
1	(Australia) Sydney	Jozef Gönci (SVK)	Sergei Kovalenko (RUS)	Sergei Martynov (BLR)
2	(Italy) Milan	Christian Bauer (GER)	Michael Babb (GBR)	Oleg Mykhaylov (UKR)
3	(Germany) Munich	Sergei Martynov (BLR)	Dawid Migała (POL)	Jordi González (ESP)
4	(United States) Atlanta	Michael Babb (GBR)	Espen Berg-Knutsen (NOR)	Václav Bečvář (CZE)
Final	(Germany) Munich	Sergei Martynov (BLR)	Jozef Gönci (SVK)	Sergei Kovalenko (RUS)

10m Air Pistol
Stage	Venue	1st place, gold medalist(s)	2nd place, silver medalist(s)	3rd place, bronze medalist(s)
1	(Australia) Sydney	Tan Zongliang (CHN)	Boris Kokorev (RUS)	Vladimir Gontcharov (RUS)
2	(Italy) Milan	Wang Yifu (CHN)	Stéphane Gagne (FRA)	Franck Dumoulin (FRA)
3	(Germany) Munich	Roberto Di Donna (ITA)	Franck Dumoulin (FRA)	Wang Yifu (CHN)
4	(United States) Atlanta	Franck Dumoulin (FRA)	Vigilio Fait (ITA)	Artur Gevorgjan (GER)
Final	(Germany) Munich	Tan Zongliang (CHN)	Franck Dumoulin (FRA)	Vladimir Gontcharov (RUS)

25m Rapid Fire Pistol
Stage	Venue	1st place, gold medalist(s)	2nd place, silver medalist(s)	3rd place, bronze medalist(s)
1	(Australia) Sydney	Ralf Schumann (GER)	Sergei Alifirenko (RUS)	Daniel Leonhard (GER)
2	(Italy) Milan	Ralf Schumann (GER)	Sergei Alifirenko (RUS)	Iulian Raicea (ROU)
3	(Germany) Munich	Ralf Schumann (GER)	Daniel Leonhard (GER)	Iulian Raicea (ROU)
4	(United States) Atlanta	Daniel Leonhard (GER)	Ralf Schumann (GER)	Emil Milev (BUL)
Final	(Germany) Munich	Ralf Schumann (GER)	Iulian Raicea (ROU)	Krzysztof Kucharczyk (POL)

50m Pistol
Stage	Venue	1st place, gold medalist(s)	2nd place, silver medalist(s)	3rd place, bronze medalist(s)
1	(Australia) Sydney	Tan Zongliang (CHN)	Mikhail Nestruyev (RUS)	Jerzy Pietrzak (POL)
2	(Italy) Milan	William Demarest (USA)	Wang Yifu (CHN)	Vigilio Fait (ITA)
3	(Germany) Munich	Wang Yifu (CHN)	Boris Kokorev (RUS)	Tanyu Kiryakov (BUL)
4	(United States) Atlanta	Igor Basinski (BLR)	Vigilio Fait (ITA)	Franck Dumoulin (FRA)
Final	(Germany) Munich	Franck Dumoulin (FRA)	Tanyu Kiryakov (BUL)	Martin Tenk (CZE)

10m Running Target
Stage	Venue	1st place, gold medalist(s)	2nd place, silver medalist(s)	3rd place, bronze medalist(s)
1	(Australia) Sydney	Manfred Kurzer (GER)	Dimitri Lykin (RUS)	Oleksandr Zinenko (UKR)
2	(Italy) Milan	Yang Ling (CHN)	Manfred Kurzer (GER)	Miroslav Januš (CZE)
3	(Germany) Munich	Attila Solti (GUA)	Oleksandr Zinenko (UKR)	Niu Zhiyuan (CHN)
4	Guatemala City	József Sike (HUN)	Manfred Kurzer (GER)	Attila Solti (GUA)
Final	(Germany) Munich	Manfred Kurzer (GER)	Niu Zhiyuan (CHN)	Attila Solti (GUA)

=== Women's individual ===
10m Air Rifle
Stage	Venue	1st place, gold medalist(s)	2nd place, silver medalist(s)	3rd place, bronze medalist(s)
1	(Australia) Sydney	Zhao Yinghui (CHN)	Sonja Pfeilschifter (GER)	Olga Pogrebnyak (BLR)
2	(Italy) Milan	Zhao Yinghui (CHN)	Sonja Pfeilschifter (GER)	Petra Horneber (GER)
3	(Germany) Munich	Valérie Bellenoue (FRA)	Choi Dae-young (KOR)	Zhao Yinghui (CHN)
4	(United States) Atlanta	Kang Cho-hyun (KOR)	Emily Caruso (USA)	Choi Dae-young (KOR)
Final	(Germany) Munich	Sonja Pfeilschifter (GER)	Emily Caruso (USA)	Gao Jing (CHN)

50m Rifle 3 Positions
Stage	Venue	1st place, gold medalist(s)	2nd place, silver medalist(s)	3rd place, bronze medalist(s)
1	(Australia) Sydney	Tatiana Goldobina (RUS)	Sonja Pfeilschifter (GER)	Shan Hong (CHN)
2	(Italy) Milan	Gabriele Bühlmann (SUI)	Natallia Kalnysh (UKR)	Petra Horneber (GER)
3	(Germany) Munich	Sonja Pfeilschifter (GER)	Natallia Kalnysh (UKR)	Lyubov Galkina (RUS)
4	(United States) Atlanta	Olga Dovgun (KAZ)	Jean Foster (USA)	Gabriele Bühlmann (SUI)
Final	(Germany) Munich	Shan Hong (CHN)	Jean Foster (USA)	Renata Mauer-Różańska (POL)

10m Air Pistol
Stage	Venue	1st place, gold medalist(s)	2nd place, silver medalist(s)	3rd place, bronze medalist(s)
1	(Australia) Sydney	Rebecca Snyder (USA)	Cao Ying (CHN)	Viktoria Chaika (BLR)
2	(Italy) Milan	Cao Ying (CHN)	Monica Rundqvist (SWE)	Ren Jie (CHN)
3	(Germany) Munich	Julita Macur (POL)	Yoko Inada (JPN)	Olga Kuznetsova (RUS)
4	(United States) Atlanta	Lalita Yauhleuskaya (BLR)	Maria Grozdeva (BUL)	Jasna Šekarić (YUG)
Final	(Germany) Munich	Tao Luna (CHN)	Olga Kuznetsova (RUS)	Lalita Yauhleuskaya (BLR)

25m Pistol
Stage	Venue	1st place, gold medalist(s)	2nd place, silver medalist(s)	3rd place, bronze medalist(s)
1	(Australia) Sydney	Tao Luna (CHN)	Julita Macur (POL)	Nino Salukvadze (GEO)
2	(Italy) Milan	Michiko Fukushima (JPN)	Yuliya Bondareva (KAZ)	Linda Ryan (AUS)
3	(Germany) Munich	Tao Luna (CHN)	Nino Salukvadze (GEO)	Boo Soon-hee (KOR)
4	(United States) Atlanta	Lalita Yauhleuskaya (BLR)	Maria Grozdeva (BUL)	Yuliya Bondareva (KAZ)
Final	(Germany) Munich	Lalita Yauhleuskaya (BLR)	Tao Luna (CHN)	Nino Salukvadze (GEO)

== Shotgun ==
=== Men's individual ===
Trap
Stage	Venue	1st place, gold medalist(s)	2nd place, silver medalist(s)	3rd place, bronze medalist(s)
1	(India) New Delhi	Custódio Ezequiel (POR)	Manuel Silva (POR)	Ahmed Al-Maktoum (UAE)
2	(Australia) Sydney	Ian Peel (GBR)	George Leary (CAN)	Aleksey Alipov (RUS)
3	(Egypt) Cairo	Lance Bade (USA)	Marco Venturini (ITA)	Alberto Hernández (ESP)
4	(Italy) Lonato	Josh Lakatos (USA)	Alfio Tomassoni (SMR)	Florin Baban (ROU)
Final	(Cyprus) Nicosia	Michael Diamond (AUS)	Aleksey Alipov (RUS)	Ahmed Al-Maktoum (UAE)

Double Trap
Stage	Venue	1st place, gold medalist(s)	2nd place, silver medalist(s)	3rd place, bronze medalist(s)
1	(India) New Delhi	Fehaid Al-Deehani (KUW)	Luca Marini (ITA)	Emanuele Bernasconi (ITA)
2	(Australia) Sydney	Russell Mark (AUS)	Jean-Paul Gros (FRA)	Marco Innocenti (ITA)
3	(Egypt) Cairo	Charles Redding (USA)	Mashfi Al-Mutairi (KUW)	Roland Gerebics (HUN)
4	(Italy) Lonato	Fehaid Al-Deehani (KUW)	Michael Diamond (AUS)	Mirco Cenci (ITA)
Final	(Cyprus) Nicosia	Li Bo (CHN)	Michael Diamond (AUS)	Fehaid Al-Deehani (KUW)

Skeet
Stage	Venue	1st place, gold medalist(s)	2nd place, silver medalist(s)	3rd place, bronze medalist(s)
1	(India) New Delhi	Hennie Dompeling (NED)	Valeriy Shomin (RUS)	Saud Habib (KUW)
2	(Australia) Sydney	Franck Durbesson (FRA)	Zhang Xindong (CHN)	Drew Harvey (GBR)
3	(Egypt) Cairo	Guillermo Alfredo Torres (CUB)	Mykola Milchev (UKR)	Jean-François Dellac (FRA)
4	(Italy) Lonato	Hennie Dompeling (NED)	Jan-Henrik Heinrich (GER)	Georgios Achilleos (CYP)
Final	(Cyprus) Nicosia	Petr Málek (CZE)	Hennie Dompeling (NED)	Valeriy Shomin (RUS)

=== Women's individual ===
Trap
Stage	Venue	1st place, gold medalist(s)	2nd place, silver medalist(s)	3rd place, bronze medalist(s)
1	(India) New Delhi	No event		
2	(Australia) Sydney	Delphine Racinet (FRA)	Susan Nattrass (CAN)	Deserie Baynes (AUS)
3	(Egypt) Cairo	No event		
4	(Italy) Lonato	Deserie Baynes (AUS)	Anne Focan (BEL)	Susan Nattrass (CAN)
Final	(Cyprus) Nicosia	Gao E (CHN)	Deserie Baynes (AUS)	Anne Focan (BEL)

Double Trap
Stage	Venue	1st place, gold medalist(s)	2nd place, silver medalist(s)	3rd place, bronze medalist(s)
1	(India) New Delhi	No event		
2	(Australia) Sydney	Yukie Nakayama (JPN)	Pia Hansen (SWE)	Zhang Yafei (CHN)
3	(Egypt) Cairo	No event		
4	(Italy) Lonato	Ding Hongping (CHN)	Pia Hansen (SWE)	Kim Rhode (USA)
Final	(Cyprus) Nicosia	Zhang Yafei (CHN)	Ding Hongping (CHN)	Kim Rhode (USA)

Skeet
Stage	Venue	1st place, gold medalist(s)	2nd place, silver medalist(s)	3rd place, bronze medalist(s)
1	(India) New Delhi	No event		
2	(Australia) Sydney	Connie Smotek (USA)	Zhang Shan (CHN)	Andrea Stranovská (SVK)
3	(Egypt) Cairo	No event		
4	(Italy) Lonato	Olga Panarina (RUS)	Svetlana Demina (RUS)	Andrea Stranovská (SVK)
Final	(Cyprus) Nicosia	Olga Panarina (RUS)	Zhang Shan (CHN)	Erdzhanik Avetisyan (RUS)
