= Shooting at the 1998 Asian Games =

Shooting events

- Venue: Huamark Sport Complex
- Dates: 7–13 December 1998

Shooting at the 1998 Asian Games was held in Hua Mark Shooting Range, Bangkok, Thailand between 7 and 13 December 1998.

== Medalists ==
=== Men ===
Event	Gold	Silver	Bronze
10 m air pistol	Xu Dan; China	Tan Zongliang; China	Vladimir Guchsha; Kazakhstan
10 m air pistol team	China; Tan Zongliang; Wang Yifu; Xu Dan	Japan; Tomohiro Kida; Masaru Nakashige; Noriyuki Nishitani	South Korea; Kim Seon-il; Kim Sung-joon; Kwon Jeong-wook
25 m center fire pistol	Park Byung-taek; South Korea	Jaspal Rana; India	Vladimir Vokhmyanin; Kazakhstan
25 m center fire pistol team	North Korea; Kim Hyon-ung; Kim Jong-su; Ryu Myong-yon	South Korea; Kim Sung-jun; Lee Sang-hak; Park Byung-taek	India; Ashok Pandit; Ved Prakash Pilaniya; Jaspal Rana
25 m rapid fire pistol	Zhang Penghui; China	Vladimir Vokhmyanin; Kazakhstan	Park Byung-taek; South Korea
25 m rapid fire pistol team	China; Ji Haiping; Meng Gang; Zhang Penghui	North Korea; Kim Hyon-ung; Kim Myong-sop; Ryu Myong-yon	Kazakhstan; Alexandr Dudin; Igor Shmotkin; Vladimir Vokhmyanin
25 m standard pistol	Jin Yongde; China	Dilshod Mukhtarov; Uzbekistan	Wirat Karndee; Thailand
25 m standard pistol team	North Korea; Kim Hyon-ung; Kim Jong-su; Kim Myong-sop	Kazakhstan; Vladimir Guchsha; Igor Shmotkin; Vladimir Vokhmyanin	China; Jin Yongde; Lu Gang; Wang Yifu
50 m pistol	Vladimir Guchsha; Kazakhstan	Wang Yifu; China	Kim Jong-su; North Korea
50 m pistol team	North Korea; Kim Hyon-ung; Kim Jong-su; Ryu Myong-yon	China; Tan Zongliang; Wang Yifu; Wu Hui	Japan; Takuya Mino; Masaru Nakashige; Noriyuki Nishitani
10 m air rifle	Cai Yalin; China	Masaru Yanagida; Japan	Komkrit Kongnamchok; Thailand
10 m air rifle team	Thailand; Samarn Jongsuk; Komkrit Kongnamchok; Tevarit Majchacheep	China; Cai Yalin; Shan Zhendong; Yao Ye	Japan; Ryohei Koba; Naoki Kurita; Masaru Yanagida
50 m rifle prone	Igor Pirekeýew; Turkmenistan	Tevarit Majchacheep; Thailand	Naoki Kurita; Japan
50 m rifle prone team	Thailand; Samarn Jongsuk; Tevarit Majchacheep; Nopparat Yavilaspradit	Kyrgyzstan; Aleksandr Babchenko; Tachir Ismailov; Yuri Lomov	China; Li Wenjie; Ning Lijia; Yu Bo
50 m rifle 3 positions	Ning Lijia; China	Yuri Lomov; Kyrgyzstan	Park Bong-duk; South Korea
50 m rifle 3 positions team	China; Cai Yalin; Ning Lijia; Shan Zhendong	South Korea; Cha Young-chul; Lee Eun-chul; Park Bong-duk	Thailand; Nutchavapong Kuntawong; Tevarit Majchacheep; Varavut Majchacheep
Trap	Fehaid Al-Deehani; Kuwait	Fahad Al-Deehani; Kuwait	Pae Won-guk; North Korea
Trap team	Kuwait; Fahad Al-Deehani; Fehaid Al-Deehani; Khaled Al-Mudhaf	India; Manavjit Singh Sandhu; Zoravar Singh Sandhu; Mansher Singh	China; Huang Lixin; Li Bo; Zhang Bing
Double trap	Hu Binyuan; China	Li Bo; China	Mashfi Al-Mutairi; Kuwait
Double trap team	China; Hu Binyuan; Li Bo; Zhang Bing	Kuwait; Fehaid Al-Deehani; Mashfi Al-Mutairi; Mubarak Al-Rashidi	Singapore; Chng Seng Mok; Lee Wung Yew; Tan Chee Keong
Skeet	Sergey Yakshin; Kazakhstan	Abdullah Al-Rashidi; Kuwait	Li Xu; China
Skeet team	Kuwait; Salah Al-Mutairi; Abdullah Al-Rashidi; Tami Al-Rashidi	China; Chen Dongjie; Li Xu; Zhang Xindong	Kazakhstan; Sergey Kolos; Ivan Struchayev; Sergey Yakshin

=== Women ===
Event	Gold	Silver	Bronze
10 m air pistol	Dina Aspandiyarova; Kazakhstan	Cai Yeqing; China	Ren Jie; China
10 m air pistol team	China; Cai Yeqing; Ren Jie; Tao Luna	Kazakhstan; Dina Aspandiyarova; Galina Belyayeva; Yuliya Bondareva	South Korea; Boo Soon-hee; Kim Mi-jung; Ko Jin-sook
25 m pistol	Cai Yeqing; China	Yuliya Bondareva; Kazakhstan	Cao Ying; China
25 m pistol team	China; Cai Yeqing; Cao Ying; Li Duihong	Kazakhstan; Dina Aspandiyarova; Galina Belyayeva; Yuliya Bondareva	Mongolia; Otryadyn Gündegmaa; Dorjsürengiin Mönkhbayar; Davaajantsangiin Oyuun
10 m air rifle	Kim Jung-mi; South Korea	Thanyarat Pupiromchaikul; Thailand	Zhao Yinghui; China
10 m air rifle team	Thailand; Jarintorn Dangpiam; Nuanwan Kerdsumran; Thanyarat Pupiromchaikul	South Korea; Kim Jung-mi; Lee Ki-young; Yeo Kab-soon	China; Shan Hong; Wang Xian; Zhao Yinghui
50 m rifle prone	Wang Xian; China	Yoko Minamoto; Japan	Noriko Ojima; Japan
50 m rifle prone team	Japan; Yoko Minamoto; Noriko Ojima; Mari Onoe	China; Shan Hong; Wang Xian; Zhao Ying	Thailand; Jarintorn Dangpiam; Tiranan Khajornklinmala; Thanyarat Pupiromchaikul
50 m rifle 3 positions	Shan Hong; China	Olga Dovgun; Kazakhstan	Kong Hyun-ah; South Korea
50 m rifle 3 positions team	China; Shan Hong; Wang Xian; Xu Yimin	Thailand; Jarintorn Dangpiam; Supunnee Khamai; Thanyarat Pupiromchaikul	Uzbekistan; Alyona Aksyonova; Nataliya Dolbilina; Yuliya Shakhova
Double trap	Gao E China	Lee Sang-hee; South Korea	Vilavan Muneemongkoltorn; Thailand
Double trap team	China; Ding Hongping; Gao E Zhang Yafei	South Korea; Lee Eun-sim; Lee Sang-hee; Son Hye-kyoung	Japan; Yoshiko Kira; Megumi Shirota; Taeko Sogabe

== Medal table ==
Rank	Nation	Gold	Silver	Bronze	Total
1	China (CHN)	18	8	8	34
2	Kazakhstan (KAZ)	3	6	4	13
3	Thailand (THA)	3	3	5	11
4	Kuwait (KUW)	3	3	1	7
5	North Korea (PRK)	3	1	2	6
6	South Korea (KOR)	2	5	5	12
7	Japan (JPN)	1	3	5	9
8	Turkmenistan (TKM)	1	0	0	1
9	India (IND)	0	2	1	3
10	Kyrgyzstan (KGZ)	0	2	0	2
11	Uzbekistan (UZB)	0	1	1	2
12	Mongolia (MGL)	0	0	1	1
12	Singapore (SIN)	0	0	1	1
Totals (13 entries)		34	34	34	102
