= Shooting at the 1996 Summer Olympics – Women's 50 metre rifle three positions =

Event at the 1996 Summer Olympics

Women's 50 metre rifle three positions at the Games of the XXVI Olympiad
- Venue: Wolf Creek Shooting Complex
- Date: 24 July 1996
- Competitors: 38 from 21 nations
- Winning score: 686.1 (OR)

Medalists
1st place, gold medalist(s)		Aleksandra Ivošev	FR Yugoslavia
2nd place, silver medalist(s)		Irina Gerasimenok	Russia
3rd place, bronze medalist(s)		Renata Mauer	Poland

Women's 50 metre rifle three positions (then known as standard rifle) was one of the fifteen shooting events at the 1996 Summer Olympics. Renata Mauer, who had won the air rifle competitions a few days earlier, set a new Olympic record of 589 points in the qualification round, but failed to win the double as she was surpassed in the final by Aleksandra Ivošev, winning on the final Olympic record score of 686.1, and Irina Gerasimenok.

== Qualification round ==
Rank	Athlete	Country	Prone	Stand	Kneel	Total	Notes
1	Renata Mauer	Poland	200	192	197	589	Q OR
2	Aleksandra Ivošev	FR Yugoslavia	199	193	195	587	Q
3	Irina Gerasimenok	Russia	196	194	195	585	Q
4	Nonka Matova	Bulgaria	197	191	196	584	Q
4	Kirsten Obel	Germany	200	194	190	584	Q
6	Elizabeth Bourland	United States	195	194	194	583	Q
6	Kong Hyun-ah	South Korea	198	191	194	583	Q
8	Tetyana Nesterova	Ukraine	197	191	193	581	Q
9	Gaby Bühlmann	Switzerland	199	192	188	579	
9	Petra Horneber	Germany	197	189	193	579	
9	Lessia Leskiv	Ukraine	199	185	195	579	
12	Jean Foster	United States	197	187	194	578	
12	Lindy Hansen	Norway	197	191	190	578	
12	Vessela Letcheva	Bulgaria	195	188	195	578	
12	Marta Nedvedova	Czech Republic	197	190	191	578	
12	Suzana Skoko	Croatia	192	194	192	578	
17	Irina Shilova	Belarus	197	188	192	577	
17	Olga Pogrebniak	Belarus	197	186	194	577	
17	Zhang Qiuping	China	197	188	192	577	
20	Chen Muhua	China	197	188	191	576	
20	Éva Joó	Hungary	197	190	189	576	
22	Dagmar Bilkova	Czech Republic	198	187	189	574	
22	Aranka Binder	FR Yugoslavia	197	189	188	574	
22	Anni Bisso	Denmark	194	190	190	574	
22	Sabina Fuchs	Switzerland	196	186	192	574	
26	Anna Maloukhina	Russia	193	186	194	573	
26	Yoko Minamoto	Japan	196	183	194	573	
28	Mladenka Malenica	Croatia	196	190	186	572	
29	Sara Antunes	Portugal	195	185	191	571	
30	Jarintorn Dangpiam	Thailand	193	183	194	570	
30	Eva Forian	Hungary	191	188	191	570	
32	Carla Ribeiro	Portugal	197	180	191	568	
32	Won Gyeong-suk	South Korea	194	185	189	568	
34	Hanne Vataker	Norway	195	185	186	566	
35	Malini Wickramasinghe	Sri Lanka	195	193	177	565	
36	Pushpamali Ramanayake	Sri Lanka	194	188	182	564	
37	Malgorzata Książkiewicz	Poland	194	181	188	563	
38	Cristina Antolin	Spain	189	186	182	557	

OR Olympic record – Q Qualified for final

== Final ==
Rank	Athlete	Qual	Final	Total	Notes
1st place, gold medalist(s)	Aleksandra Ivošev (YUG)	587	99.1	686.1	OR
2nd place, silver medalist(s)	Irina Gerasimenok (RUS)	585	95.1	680.1	
3rd place, bronze medalist(s)	Renata Mauer (POL)	589	90.8	679.8	
4	Kirsten Obel (GER)	584	95.2	679.2	
5	Nonka Matova (BUL)	584	94.8	678.8	
6	Kong Hyun-ah (KOR)	583	92.8	675.8	
7	Elizabeth Bourland (USA)	583	91.0	674.0	
8	Tetyana Nesterova (UKR)	581	92.3	673.3	

OR Olympic record

== Sources ==
- Olympic Report Atlanta 1996 Volume III: The Competition Results (PDF).
