= Shooting at the 2002 Asian Games – Women's 50 metre rifle three positions =

Women's 50 metre rifle 3 positions at the 2002 Asian Games
- Venue: Changwon International Shooting Range
- Dates: 6 October 2002
- Competitors: 37 from 15 nations

Medalists
gold medal	Du Li	China
silver medal	Olga Dovgun	Kazakhstan
bronze medal	Wang Xian	China

The women's 50 metre rifle three positions competition at the 2002 Asian Games in Busan, South Korea was held on 6 October at the Changwon International Shooting Range.

== Schedule ==
All times are Korea Standard Time (UTC+09:00)

Date	Time	Event
Sunday, 6 October 2002	09:00	Qualification
Sunday, 6 October 2002	14:00	Final

== Records ==
Prior to this competition, the existing world, Asian and Games records were as follows.

Qualification
World Record	Vesela Letcheva (BUL)	592	Munich, Germany	15 June 1995
Asian Record	Shan Hong (CHN)	592	Milan, Italy	28 May 1999
Games Record	Yoko Minamoto (JPN)	579	Beijing, China	28 September 1990
Final
World Record	Vesela Letcheva (BUL)	689.7	Munich, Germany	15 June 1995
Asian Record	Wang Xian (CHN)	689.7	Milan, Italy	29 May 1998
Games Record	Yoko Minamoto (JPN)	674.1	Beijing, China	28 September 1990

== Results ==
=== Qualification ===
Rank	Athlete	Prone		Standing		Kneeling		Total	Notes
Rank	Athlete	1	2	1	2	1	2	Total	Notes
1	Du Li (CHN)	99	100	94	98	98	99	588	GR
2	Wang Xian (CHN)	99	99	92	98	99	99	586	
3	Olga Dovgun (KAZ)	100	98	95	96	99	98	586	
4	Lee Sun-min (KOR)	97	99	97	95	97	98	583	
5	Kong Hyun-ah (KOR)	98	98	96	93	97	98	580	
6	Nurul Hudda Baharin (MAS)	98	97	94	99	96	96	580	
7	Shan Hong (CHN)	98	99	96	95	96	96	580	
8	Kim Jung-mi (KOR)	98	98	96	97	96	94	579	
9	Rentsengiin Oyuun-Otgon (MGL)	99	98	93	94	95	96	575	
10	Deepali Deshpande (IND)	97	99	91	93	97	97	574	
10	Galina Korchma (KAZ)	98	97	95	94	96	94	574	
10	Damdinsürengiin Lkhamsüren (MGL)	100	97	92	98	94	93	574	
10	Mari Onoe (JPN)	99	98	94	94	97	92	574	
14	Nattichata Siththipong (THA)	97	97	94	92	95	97	572	
15	Ako Sasaki (JPN)	96	99	89	97	94	96	571	
15	Pushpamali Ramanayake (SRI)	97	99	91	95	94	95	571	
17	Varvara Kovalenko (KAZ)	95	98	95	88	97	96	569	
17	Anjali Bhagwat (IND)	97	99	93	94	91	95	569	
17	Jasmin Luis (PHI)	97	98	94	95	91	94	569	
20	Sasithorn Hongprasert (THA)	96	98	91	90	95	96	566	
20	Yuko Aizawa (JPN)	94	98	93	97	91	93	566	
22	Nazish Khan (PAK)	98	96	91	92	94	94	565	
22	Roslina Bakar (MAS)	99	98	88	92	97	91	565	
22	Elena Kostyukova (KGZ)	98	97	92	93	95	90	565	
25	Nadia Saeed (PAK)	97	95	92	91	93	95	563	
25	Nor Dalilah Abu Bakar (MAS)	98	98	93	86	92	96	563	
27	Pojjanee Pongsinwijit (THA)	96	99	87	93	91	95	561	
27	Zorigtyn Batkhuyag (MGL)	97	96	94	91	88	95	561	
29	Kuheli Gangulee (IND)	94	98	92	93	89	92	558	
30	Sabrina Sultana (BAN)	94	97	92	92	88	91	554	
31	Ýeketerina Arabowa (TKM)	94	95	91	92	89	91	552	
32	Indunil Pussella (SRI)	93	94	91	91	90	90	549	
33	Muna Al-Mejali (QAT)	97	94	87	85	89	91	543	
34	Sabika Al-Muhannadi (QAT)	94	95	82	85	94	90	540	
34	Fawzia Karim (BAN)	94	94	83	86	93	90	540	
36	Urooj Zahid (PAK)	94	96	88	86	92	81	537	
37	Matara Al-Aseiri (QAT)	97	87	79	85	91	93	532	

=== Final ===
Rank	Athlete	Qual.	Final											Total	S-off	Notes
Rank	Athlete	Qual.	1	2	3	4	5	6	7	8	9	10	Total	Total	S-off	Notes
1st place, gold medalist(s)	Du Li (CHN)	588	10.3	10.1	9.7	9.5	9.7	9.5	10.3	9.4	10.0	9.0	97.5	685.5		GR
2nd place, silver medalist(s)	Olga Dovgun (KAZ)	586	10.5	10.1	10.5	9.4	10.5	9.5	10.7	6.9	9.3	8.9	96.3	682.3		
3rd place, bronze medalist(s)	Wang Xian (CHN)	586	9.9	10.1	9.6	8.2	10.2	10.1	10.6	7.6	9.8	10.1	96.2	682.2		
4	Lee Sun-min (KOR)	583	9.5	9.4	10.0	9.8	9.0	10.7	9.5	9.2	9.8	9.3	96.2	679.2		
5	Kong Hyun-ah (KOR)	580	9.6	8.9	10.1	10.5	9.1	8.7	8.7	10.3	10.8	10.6	97.3	677.3		
6	Shan Hong (CHN)	580	8.3	10.5	10.7	10.6	8.9	9.9	8.7	9.8	10.1	8.7	96.2	676.2	9.6	
7	Nurul Hudda Baharin (MAS)	580	10.0	10.4	10.2	8.6	9.5	10.2	8.3	10.2	10.2	8.6	96.2	676.2	8.9	
8	Kim Jung-mi (KOR)	579	8.7	10.3	9.4	9.1	10.3	9.1	8.7	9.8	10.3	10.2	95.9	674.9		
