= Shooting at the 2000 Summer Olympics – Women's 50 metre rifle three positions =

Sports shooting at the Olympics

Women's 50 metre rifle three positions at the Games of the XXVII Olympiad
- Venue: Sydney International Shooting Centre
- Date: 20 September 2000
- Competitors: 42 from 28 nations
- Winning score: 684.6

Medalists
1st place, gold medalist(s)		Renata Mauer	Poland
2nd place, silver medalist(s)		Tatiana Goldobina	Russia
3rd place, bronze medalist(s)		Maria Feklistova	Russia

The women's 50 metre rifle three positions competition at the 2000 Summer Olympics was held on 20 September. The qualification round, consisting of 20 shots from each position, was fired between 09:00 and 11:30 Australian Eastern Standard Time (UTC+10), and the final round of 10 additional shots standing at 12:15.

== Records ==
The existing World and Olympic records were as follows.

Qualification records
World record	Vessela Letcheva (BUL)	592	Munich, Germany	15 June 1995
Olympic record	Renata Mauer (POL)	589	Atlanta, United States	24 July 1996

Final records
World record	Vessela Letcheva (BUL)	689.7 (592+97.7)	Munich, Germany	15 June 1995
Olympic record	Aleksandra Ivosev (YUG)	686.1	Atlanta, United States	24 July 1996

== Qualification round ==
Rank	Athlete	Country	Prone	Stand	Kneel	Total	Notes
1	Sonja Pfeilschifter	Germany	200	188	197	585	Q
2	Tatiana Goldobina	Russia	198	191	196	585	Q
3	Renata Mauer	Poland	198	192	195	585	Q
4	Anni Bisso	Denmark	199	192	193	584	Q
5	Olga Dovgun	Kazakhstan	197	188	198	583	Q
6	Maria Feklistova	Russia	194	192	196	582	Q
7	Shan Hong	China	198	185	197	580	Q
8	Melissa Mulloy	United States	197	193	190	580	Q
9	Lindy Hansen	Norway	197	187	195	579	
9	Lessia Leskiv	Ukraine	199	188	192	579	
11	Vessela Letcheva	Bulgaria	196	188	194	578	
11	Olga Pogrebnyak	Belarus	199	189	190	578	
11	Alexandra Schneider	Germany	197	186	195	578	
14	Nonka Matova	Bulgaria	199	186	192	577	
14	Lucie Valová	Czech Republic	193	192	192	577	
16	Wang Xian	China	197	189	190	576	
17	Valérie Bellenoue	France	194	189	192	575	
17	Petra Horneber	Germany	197	189	189	575	
17	Oriana Scheuss	Switzerland	197	187	191	575	
20	Sue McCready	Australia	193	187	194	574	
20	Irina Shilova	Belarus	196	185	193	574	
22	Aleksandra Ivosev	FR Yugoslavia	197	185	191	573	
23	Batkhuyagyn Zorigt	Mongolia	194	187	191	572	
23	Aranka Binder	FR Yugoslavia	196	187	189	572	
23	Gaby Bühlmann	Switzerland	196	193	183	572	
26	Sharon Bowes	Canada	196	185	190	571	
26	Jean Foster	United States	198	185	188	571	
26	Mladenka Maleniča	Croatia	196	183	192	571	
29	Natallia Kalnysh	Ukraine	197	177	194	568	
30	Alyona Aksyonova	Uzbekistan	194	185	188	567	
30	Eunice Caballero	Cuba	188	186	193	567	
30	Yuliya Shakhova	Uzbekistan	192	187	188	567	
33	Anjali Vedpathak	India	196	185	185	566	
34	Marina Pons	Spain	187	188	190	565	
35	Thrine Kane	United States	188	183	191	562	
36	Divna Pešić	Macedonia	190	190	181	561	
37	Hiromi Misaki	Japan	197	181	180	558	
38	Sabrina Sultana	Bangladesh	189	176	189	554	
39	Carrie Quigley	Australia	198	174	179	551	
40	Cari Johnson	Canada	193	168	183	544	
41	Amelia Rosa Fournel	Argentina	188	177	177	542	
42	Malini Wickramasinghe	Sri Lanka	191	172	165	528	

Q Qualified for final

== Final ==
Rank	Athlete	Qual	Final	Total
1st place, gold medalist(s)	Renata Mauer (POL)	585	99.6	684.6
2nd place, silver medalist(s)	Tatiana Goldobina (RUS)	585	95.9	680.9
3rd place, bronze medalist(s)	Maria Feklistova (RUS)	582	97.9	679.9
4	Sonja Pfeilschifter (GER)	585	93.5	678.5
5	Shan Hong (CHN)	580	96.9	676.9
6	Anni Bisso (DEN)	584	91.6	675.6
7	Olga Dovgun (KAZ)	583	91.2	674.2
8	Melissa Mulloy (USA)	580	93.7	673.7

== Sources ==
- Official Report of the XXVII Olympiad — Shooting (PDF).
