= Shooting at the 1996 Summer Olympics – Women's 10 metre air rifle =

Sports shooting at the Olympics

Women's 10 metre air rifle at the Games of the XXVI Olympiad
- Venue: Wolf Creek Shooting Complex
- Date: 20 July 1996
- Competitors: 49 from 31 nations
- Winning score: 497.6

Medalists
1st place, gold medalist(s)		Renata Mauer	Poland
2nd place, silver medalist(s)		Petra Horneber	Germany
3rd place, bronze medalist(s)		Aleksandra Ivošev	FR Yugoslavia

Women's 10 metre air rifle was one of the fifteen shooting events at the 1996 Summer Olympics. Renata Mauer narrowly defeated Petra Horneber to win her first Olympic gold medal, as well as the first gold medal of the Atlanta games. Aleksandra Ivošev won the bronze medal; all three medalists finished within 0.4 points of each other.

== Qualification round ==
Rank	Athlete	Country	Score	Notes
1	Petra Horneber	Germany	397	Q OR
2	Renata Mauer	Poland	395	Q
3	Valérie Bellenoue	France	395	Q
4	Marta Nedvedova	Czech Republic	395	Q
5	Aleksandra Ivošev	FR Yugoslavia	395	Q
6	Olga Pogrebniak	Belarus	394	Q
7	Lessia Leskiv	Ukraine	394	Q
8	Éva Joó	Hungary	393	Q (4th: 100; 3rd: 100)
9	Aranka Binder	FR Yugoslavia	393	(4th: 100; 3rd: 98)
9	Irina Shilova	Belarus	393	(4th: 99)
9	Jin Sun-ryeong	South Korea	393	(4th: 98)
9	Xu Yanhua	China	393	(4th: 98)
13	Elizabeth Bourland	United States	392	
13	Gaby Bühlmann	Switzerland	392	
13	Amelia Fournel	Argentina	392	
13	Sabina Fuchs	Switzerland	392	
13	Marina Grigoryeva	Russia	392	
13	Vessela Letcheva	Bulgaria	392	
19	Kim Jung-mi	South Korea	391	
20	Dagmar Bilkova	Czech Republic	390	
20	Mladenka Malenica	Croatia	390	
20	Anna Maloukhina	Russia	390	
20	Nonka Matova	Bulgaria	390	
25	Cindy Bouque	Belgium	389	
25	Lindy Hansen	Norway	389	
25	Pushpamali Ramanayake	Sri Lanka	389	
25	Suzana Skoko	Croatia	389	
29	Jarintorn Dangpiam	Thailand	388	
29	Tetyana Nesterova	Ukraine	388	
31	Sue Banks	Australia	387	
31	Anni Bisso	Denmark	387	
31	Eva Forian	Hungary	387	
31	Masami Iwaki	Japan	387	
31	Iris Kremer-Roseneck	Luxembourg	387	
36	Cristina Antolín	Spain	386	
36	Bettina Knells	Germany	386	
36	Nancy Napolski	United States	386	
39	Yoko Minamoto	Japan	385	
39	Fabienne Pasetti	Monaco	385	
41	Carole Couesnon	France	384	
41	Malgorzata Książkiewicz	Poland	384	
43	Rhona Barry	Ireland	382	
44	Hanne Vataker	Norway	381	
44	Malini Wickramasinghe	Sri Lanka	381	
46	Lida Fariman	Iran	379	
47	Sara Antunes	Portugal	377	
48	Carla Ribeiro	Portugal	375	
49	Bibhashwori Rai	Nepal	359	

OR Olympic record – Q Qualified for final

== Final ==
Rank	Athlete	Qual	Final	Total
1st place, gold medalist(s)	Renata Mauer (POL)	395	102.6	497.6
2nd place, silver medalist(s)	Petra Horneber (GER)	397	100.4	497.4
3rd place, bronze medalist(s)	Aleksandra Ivošev (YUG)	395	102.2	497.2
4	Valérie Bellenoue (FRA)	395	101.6	496.6
5	Olga Pogrebniak (BLR)	394	102.4	496.4
6	Marta Nedvedova (CZE)	395	100.1	495.1
7	Éva Joó (HUN)	393	101.5	494.5
8	Lessia Leskiv (UKR)	394	100.2	494.2

== Sources ==
- Olympic Report Atlanta 1996 Volume III: The Competition Results (PDF).
