= Shooting at the 2000 Summer Olympics =

Shooting at the Games of the XXVII Olympiad
- Pictogram for Shooting
- Dates: 16–23 September

The shooting competitions at the 2000 Summer Olympics were carried out at the Sydney International Shooting Centre in Liverpool, New South Wales, Australia during the first week of the Games, from Saturday 16 September 2000 to Saturday 23 September 2000.

While the rifle, pistol and running target rules were largely unchanged from the Atlanta Games, two new events were added, raising the number of individual Olympic shooting events to an all-time high of seventeen.

== Medal summary ==
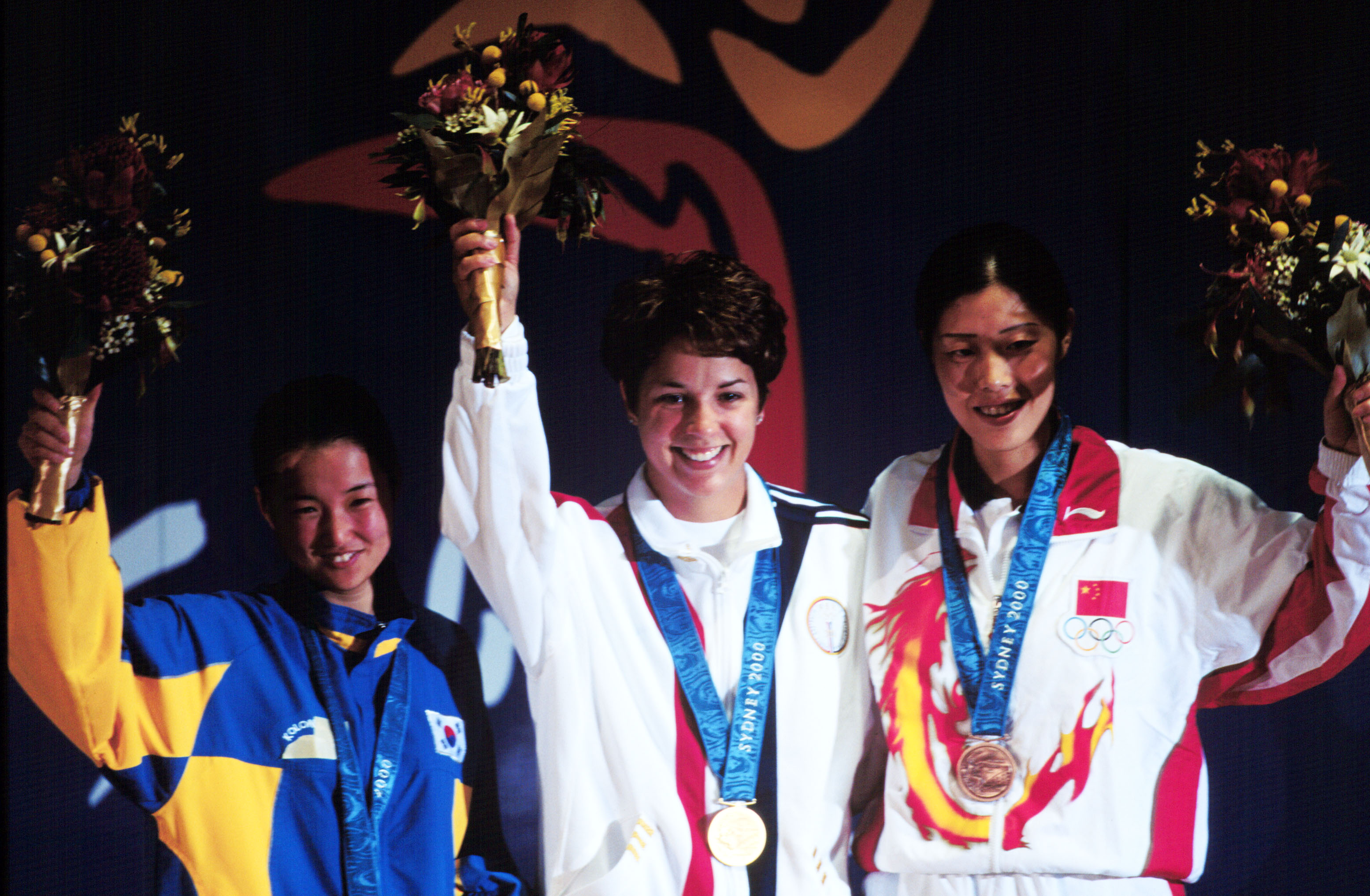
Women's 10 metre air rifle: Nancy Johnson (center), Kang Cho-hyun (left), and Gao Jing (right) won the first medals of the 2000 Olympic Games.

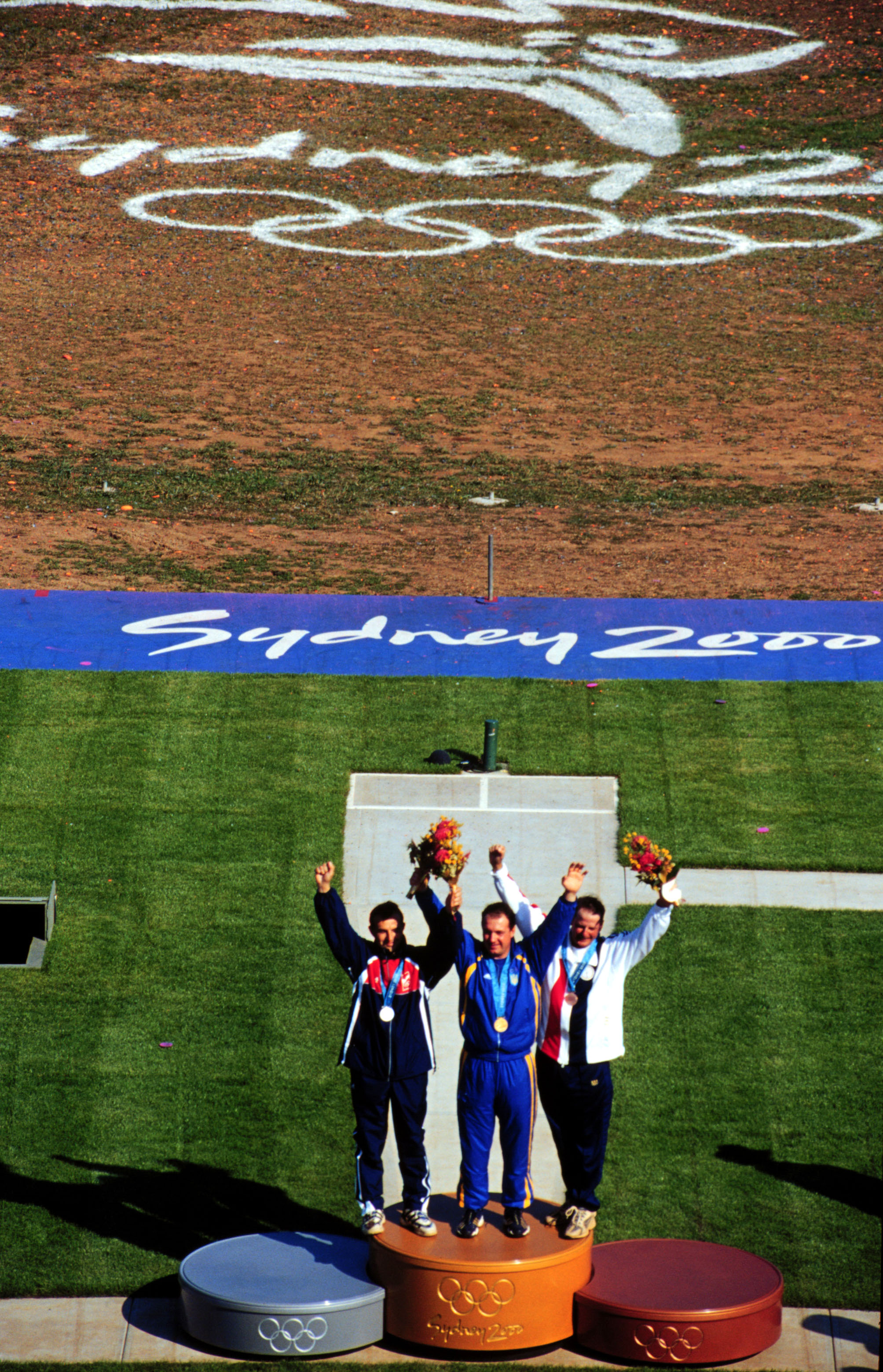
Men's skeet: Mykola Milchev (center), Petr Málek (left) and James Graves (right) won the last Sydney shooting medals.

=== Medal table ===
Rank	Nation	Gold	Silver	Bronze	Total
1	China	3	2	3	8
2	Bulgaria	2	0	0	2
2	Sweden	2	0	0	2
4	Russia	1	3	2	6
5	Australia	1	1	1	3
6	France	1	1	0	2
6	Great Britain	1	1	0	2
8	United States	1	0	2	3
9	Azerbaijan	1	0	0	1
9	Lithuania	1	0	0	1
9	Poland	1	0	0	1
9	Slovenia	1	0	0	1
9	Ukraine	1	0	0	1
14	Belarus	0	1	3	4
15	Czech Republic	0	1	1	2
15	Italy	0	1	1	2
17	Denmark	0	1	0	1
17	FR Yugoslavia	0	1	0	1
17	Finland	0	1	0	1
17	Moldova	0	1	0	1
17	South Korea	0	1	0	1
17	Switzerland	0	1	0	1
23	Hungary	0	0	1	1
23	Kuwait	0	0	1	1
23	Norway	0	0	1	1
23	Romania	0	0	1	1
Totals (26 entries)		17	17	17	51

=== Men's events ===
Games	Gold	Silver	Bronze
50 metre rifle three positions	Rajmond Debevec; Slovenia	Juha Hirvi; Finland	Harald Stenvaag; Norway
50 metre rifle prone	Jonas Edman; Sweden	Torben Grimmel; Denmark	Sergei Martynov; Belarus
10 metre air rifle	Cai Yalin; China	Artem Khadjibekov; Russia	Yevgeni Aleinikov; Russia
50 metre pistol	Tanyu Kiryakov; Bulgaria	Igor Basinski; Belarus	Martin Tenk; Czech Republic
25 metre rapid fire pistol	Sergei Alifirenko; Russia	Michel Ansermet; Switzerland	Iulian Raicea; Romania
10 metre air pistol	Franck Dumoulin; France	Wang Yifu; China	Igor Basinski; Belarus
Trap	Michael Diamond; Australia	Ian Peel; Great Britain	Giovanni Pellielo; Italy
Double trap	Richard Faulds; Great Britain	Russell Mark; Australia	Fehaid Al Deehani; Kuwait
Skeet	Mykola Milchev; Ukraine	Petr Málek; Czech Republic	James Graves; United States
10 metre running target	Yang Ling; China	Oleg Moldovan; Moldova	Niu Zhiyuan; China

=== Women's events ===
Games	Gold	Silver	Bronze
50 metre rifle three positions	Renata Mauer; Poland	Tatiana Goldobina; Russia	Maria Feklistova; Russia
10 metre air rifle	Nancy Johnson; United States	Kang Cho-hyun; South Korea	Gao Jing; China
25 metre pistol	Mariya Grozdeva; Bulgaria	Tao Luna; China	Lalita Yauhleuskaya; Belarus
10 metre air pistol	Tao Luna; China	Jasna Šekarić; FR Yugoslavia	Annemarie Forder; Australia
Trap	Daina Gudzinevičiūtė; Lithuania	Delphine Racinet; France	Gao E China
Double trap	Pia Hansen; Sweden	Deborah Gelisio; Italy	Kim Rhode; United States
Skeet	Zemfira Meftahatdinova; Azerbaijan	Svetlana Demina; Russia	Diána Igaly; Hungary

== Participating nations ==
A total of 408 shooters, 262 men and 146 women, from 103 nations competed at the Sydney Games:

- Albania (1)
- Andorra (1)
- Angola (1)
- Argentina (4)
- Armenia (1)
- Australia (23)
- Austria (4)
- Azerbaijan (2)
- Bangladesh (1)
- Barbados (1)
- Belarus (12)
- Belgium (1)
- Bosnia and Herzegovina (2)
- Brunei (1)
- Bulgaria (6)
- Canada (9)
- Chile (2)
- China (21)
- Chinese Taipei (1)
- Colombia (3)
- Croatia (2)

- Cuba (6)
- Cyprus (3)
- Czech Republic (9)
- Denmark (4)
- Ecuador (1)
- Egypt (8)
- El Salvador (1)
- Estonia (1)
- Finland (7)
- France (12)
- Georgia (2)
- Germany (20)
- Great Britain (6)
- Greece (2)
- Guatemala (3)
- Hong Kong (1)
- Hungary (7)
- Iceland (1)
- India (3)
- Iran (1)

- Ireland (3)
- Israel (2)
- Italy (15)
- Japan (9)
- Jordan (1)
- Kazakhstan (6)
- Kuwait (5)
- Kyrgyzstan (2)
- Latvia (2)
- Lebanon (1)
- Liechtenstein (1)
- Lithuania (1)
- Macedonia (1)
- Malaysia (1)
- Malta (1)
- Mexico (1)
- Moldova (1)
- Monaco (1)
- Mongolia (3)
- Namibia (1)
- Nepal (1)

- Netherlands (3)
- Netherlands Antilles (1)
- New Zealand (7)
- Nicaragua (1)
- North Korea (1)
- Norway (5)
- Oman (1)
- Pakistan (1)
- Panama (1)
- Peru (2)
- Philippines (1)
- Poland (5)
- Portugal (3)
- Puerto Rico (2)
- Qatar (1)
- Romania (3)
- Russia (21)
- San Marino (2)
- Saudi Arabia (1)
- FR Yugoslavia (6)

- Singapore (1)
- Slovakia (3)
- Slovenia (3)
- South Africa (3)
- South Korea (8)
- Spain (4)
- Sri Lanka (2)
- Sweden (6)
- Switzerland (3)
- Syria (1)
- Thailand (2)
- Turkey (2)
- Turkmenistan (1)
- Ukraine (6)
- United Arab Emirates (2)
- United States (28)
- Virgin Islands (2)
- Uruguay (1)
- Uzbekistan (3)
- Venezuela (2)
- Vietnam (1)
