= Shooting at the 2002 Asian Games – Women's 50 metre rifle three positions team =

Women's 50 metre rifle 3 positions team at the 2002 Asian Games
- Venue: Changwon International Shooting Range
- Dates: 6 October 2002
- Competitors: 30 from 10 nations

Medalists
gold medal	China; Du Li, Shan Hong, Wang Xian
silver medal	South Korea; Kim Jung-mi, Kong Hyun-ah, Lee Sun-min
bronze medal	Kazakhstan; Olga Dovgun, Galina Korchma, Varvara Kovalenko

The women's 50 metre rifle three positions team competition at the 2002 Asian Games in Busan, South Korea was held on 6 October at the Changwon International Shooting Range.

== Schedule ==
All times are Korea Standard Time (UTC+09:00)

Date	Time	Event
Sunday, 6 October 2002	09:00	Final

== Records ==
Prior to this competition, the existing world, Asian and Games records were as follows.

World Record	China	1754	Barcelona, Spain	24 July 1998
Asian Record	China	1754	Barcelona, Spain	24 July 1998
Games Record	China	1722	Beijing, China	28 September 1990

== Results ==
Rank	Team	Prone		Standing		Kneeling		Total	Notes
Rank	Team	1	2	1	2	1	2	Total	Notes
1st place, gold medalist(s)	China (CHN)	296	298	282	291	293	294	1754	GR
	Du Li	99	100	94	98	98	99	588	
	Shan Hong	98	99	96	95	96	96	580	
	Wang Xian	99	99	92	98	99	99	586	
2nd place, silver medalist(s)	South Korea (KOR)	293	295	289	285	290	290	1742	
	Kim Jung-mi	98	98	96	97	96	94	579	
	Kong Hyun-ah	98	98	96	93	97	98	580	
	Lee Sun-min	97	99	97	95	97	98	583	
3rd place, bronze medalist(s)	Kazakhstan (KAZ)	293	293	285	278	292	288	1729	
	Olga Dovgun	100	98	95	96	99	98	586	
	Galina Korchma	98	97	95	94	96	94	574	
	Varvara Kovalenko	95	98	95	88	97	96	569	
4	Japan (JPN)	289	295	276	288	282	281	1711	
	Yuko Aizawa	94	98	93	97	91	93	566	
	Mari Onoe	99	98	94	94	97	92	574	
	Ako Sasaki	96	99	89	97	94	96	571	
5	Mongolia (MGL)	296	291	279	283	277	284	1710	
	Zorigtyn Batkhuyag	97	96	94	91	88	95	561	
	Damdinsürengiin Lkhamsüren	100	97	92	98	94	93	574	
	Rentsengiin Oyuun-Otgon	99	98	93	94	95	96	575	
6	Malaysia (MAS)	295	293	275	277	285	283	1708	
	Nor Dalilah Abu Bakar	98	98	93	86	92	96	563	
	Nurul Hudda Baharin	98	97	94	99	96	96	580	
	Roslina Bakar	99	98	88	92	97	91	565	
7	India (IND)	288	296	276	280	277	284	1701	
	Anjali Bhagwat	97	99	93	94	91	95	569	
	Deepali Deshpande	97	99	91	93	97	97	574	
	Kuheli Gangulee	94	98	92	93	89	92	558	
8	Thailand (THA)	289	294	272	275	281	288	1699	
	Sasithorn Hongprasert	96	98	91	90	95	96	566	
	Pojjanee Pongsinwijit	96	99	87	93	91	95	561	
	Nattichata Siththipong	97	97	94	92	95	97	572	
9	Pakistan (PAK)	289	287	271	269	279	270	1665	
	Nazish Khan	98	96	91	92	94	94	565	
	Nadia Saeed	97	95	92	91	93	95	563	
	Urooj Zahid	94	96	88	86	92	81	537	
10	Qatar (QAT)	288	276	248	255	274	274	1615	
	Matara Al-Aseiri	97	87	79	85	91	93	532	
	Muna Al-Mejali	97	94	87	85	89	91	543	
	Sabika Al-Muhannadi	94	95	82	85	94	90	540	
