= Shooting at the 2000 Summer Olympics – Women's 10 metre air rifle =

Sports shooting at the Olympics

Women's 10 metre air rifle at the Games of the XXVII Olympiad
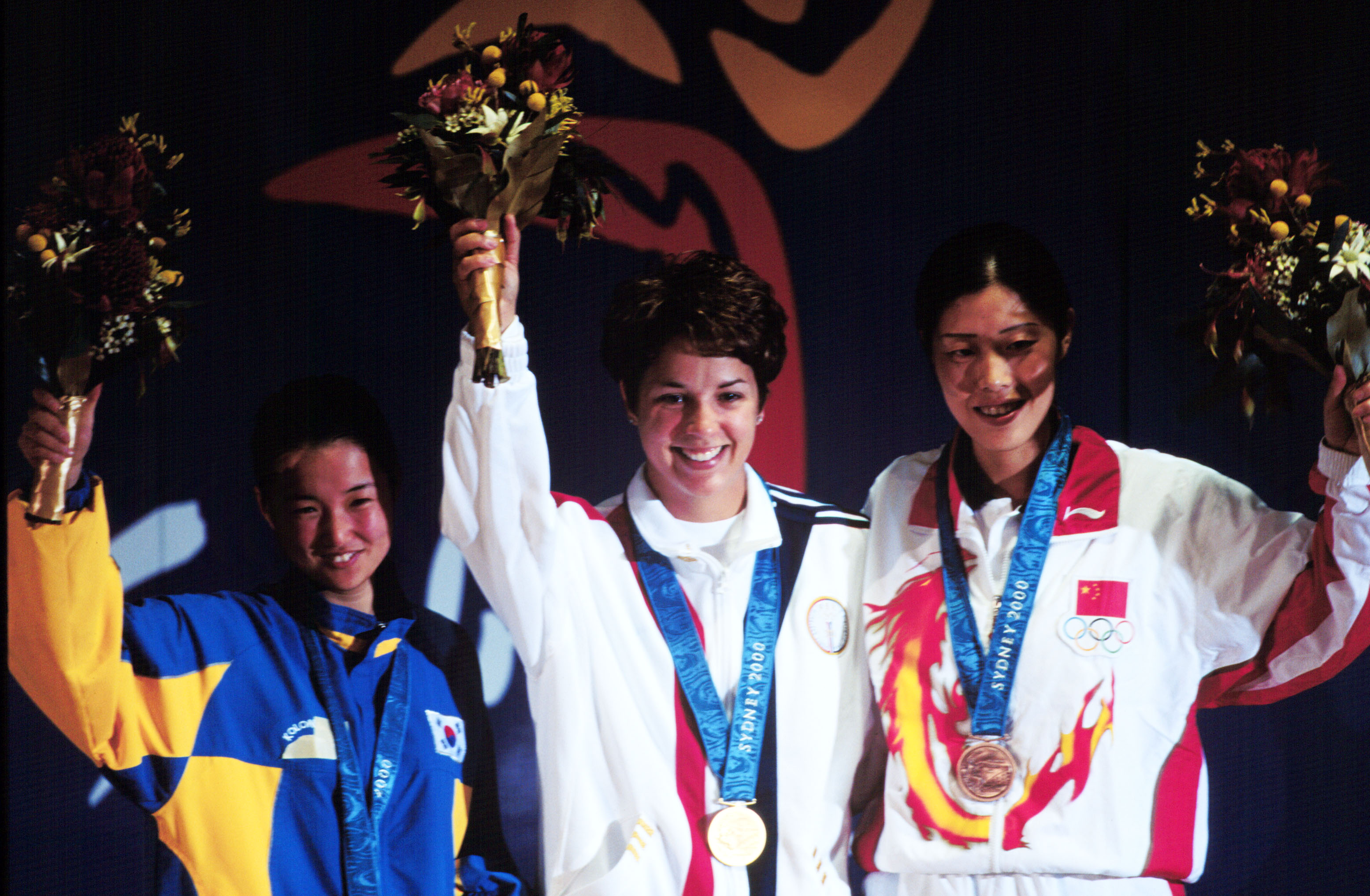
- Venue: Sydney International Shooting Centre
- Date: 16 September 2000
- Competitors: 49 from 35 nations
- Winning score: 497.7

Medalists
1st place, gold medalist(s)		Nancy Johnson	United States
2nd place, silver medalist(s)		Kang Cho-hyun	South Korea
3rd place, bronze medalist(s)		Gao Jing	China

Following a recent tradition, the women's 10 metre air rifle competition was the first medal event concluded at the 2000 Summer Olympics. It was held on 16 September, the day after the opening ceremony, with the 40-shot qualification round between 09:00 and 10:15 Australian Eastern Standard Time (UTC+10), and the final round of 10 additional shots at 11:00. Kang Cho-hyun equalled the Olympic record in the qualification round but lost her two-point pre-final lead to Nancy Johnson, who thus won the first Sydney gold medal for the United States.

== Records ==
The existing World and Olympic records were as follows.

Qualification records
World record	Valentina Cherkasova (URS)	399	Los Angeles, United States	23 March 1991
Olympic record	Petra Horneber (GER)	397	Atlanta, United States	20 July 1996

Final records
World record	Gaby Bühlmann (SUI)	503.5	Munich, Germany	24 May 1998
Olympic record	Yeo Kab-soon (KOR)	498.2	Barcelona, Spain	27 July 1992

== Qualification round ==
Rank	Athlete	Country	Score	Notes
1	Kang Cho-hyun	South Korea	397	Q EOR
2	Lioubov Galkina	Russia	395	Q
3	Sonja Pfeilschifter	Germany	395	Q
4	Choi Dae-young	South Korea	395	Q
5	Nancy Johnson	United States	395	Q
6	Jayme Dickman	United States	394	Q
7	Anjali Vedpathak	India	394	Q
8	Gao Jing	China	394	Q
9	Lindy Hansen	Norway	393	
9	Monika Haselsberger	Austria	393	
9	Petra Horneber	Germany	393	
9	Mladenka Maleniča	Croatia	393	
9	Olga Pogrebnyak	Belarus	393	
9	Zhao Yinghui	China	393	
15	Aranka Binder	FR Yugoslavia	392	
15	Lessia Leskiv	Ukraine	392	
15	Renata Mauer	Poland	392	
15	Sue McCready	Australia	392	
15	Hiromi Misaki	Japan	392	
20	Alyona Aksyonova	Uzbekistan	391	
20	Batkhuyagyn Zorigt	Mongolia	391	
20	Valérie Bellenoue	France	391	
20	Anni Bisso	Denmark	391	
20	Olga Dovgun	Kazakhstan	391	
20	Aleksandra Ivosev	FR Yugoslavia	391	
20	Vessela Letcheva	Bulgaria	391	
20	Natalija Prednik	Slovenia	391	
28	Gaby Bühlmann	Switzerland	390	
28	Amelia Rosa Fournel	Argentina	390	
28	Yasmine Helmi	Egypt	390	
28	Natallia Kalnysh	Ukraine	390	
32	Sharon Bowes	Canada	389	
32	Tatiana Goldobina	Russia	389	
32	Oksana Kovtonovich	Belarus	389	−2p
32	Yuliya Shakhova	Uzbekistan	389	
36	Eunice Caballero	Cuba	388	
36	Nonka Matova	Bulgaria	388	
36	Marina Pons	Spain	388	
36	Oriana Scheuss	Switzerland	388	
36	Lucie Valová	Czech Republic	388	
41	Lindy Imgrund	Australia	387	
41	Fabienne Pasetti	Monaco	387	
43	Bhagawati Khatri	Nepal	386	
44	Rasheya Jasmin Luis	Philippines	384	
44	Divna Pešić	Macedonia	384	
46	Sabrina Sultana	Bangladesh	383	
47	Malini Wickramasinghe	Sri Lanka	382	
48	Cari Johnson	Canada	381	
49	Marwa Sultan	Egypt	376	

−2p 2 points deducted (scoring protest turned down) – EOR Equalled Olympic record – Q Qualified for final

== Final ==
Rank	Athlete	Qual	Final	Total	Shoot-off
1st place, gold medalist(s)	Nancy Johnson (USA)	395	102.7	497.7	
2nd place, silver medalist(s)	Kang Cho-hyun (KOR)	397	100.5	497.5	
3rd place, bronze medalist(s)	Gao Jing (CHN)	394	103.2	497.2	
4	Lioubov Galkina (RUS)	395	101.7	496.7	
5	Sonja Pfeilschifter (GER)	395	100.9	495.9	
6	Jayme Dickman (USA)	394	101.4	495.4	
7	Choi Dae-young (KOR)	395	98.1	493.1	10.4
8	Anjali Vedpathak (IND)	394	99.1	493.1	9.8

== Sources ==
- Official Report of the XXVII Olympiad — Shooting (PDF).
