= Antolin (name) =

Antolin is the Basque form of the masculine given name Antonio in use in the Basque Country. Notable people with this name include the following:

== Given name ==
- Saint Antoninus of Pamiers, known as San Antolín in Spanish
- Antolín Alcaraz (born 1982), Paraguayan footballer
- Antolín de Santiago (1918–?), Spanish politician, lawyer, academic and journalist
- Antolín García (1928–1990), Spanish radio and television presenter
- Antolín Monescillo y Viso (1811–1897), Spanish cardinal
- Antolin Oreta (born 1971), Filipino politician
- Antolín Ortega (born 1951), Spanish footballer
- Antolín Pulido (born 1962), Spanish communist writer and theorist
- Antolín Sánchez (born 1955), Spanish politician

== Middle name ==
- Ernesto Antolin Salgado (born 1936), Fillipino Catholic bishop
- José Antolin Toledano (1936–2022), Spanish industrialist

== Surname ==
- Aljaž Antolin (born 2002), Slovenian footballer
- Cristina Antolín (born 1973), Spanish sport shooter
- Daniel Raba Antolín, known as Dani Raba (born 1995), Spanish footballer
- Dustin Antolin (born 1989), American baseball player
- Enriqueta Antolín (1941–2013), Spanish writer
- Francisco Sedano Antolín, known as Paco Sedano (born 1979), Spanish futsal player
- Jeanette Antolin (born 1981), American gymnast
- Keola Antolin (born 1990), American-born Canadian football player
- Marc Antolin (born 1987), Welsh actor
- María Luisa García Antolín (born 2006), Spanish footballer
- Marvelous Antolín Garzón, known as Marvel (born 2003), Spanish footballer

== See also ==
- Antolin (disambiguation)
- Antonin (name)
- Antoin
