= Shooting at the 1999 Pan American Games =

Shooting at the 1999 Pan American Games lists the results of all firearm-shooting events held at the 1999 Pan American Games in Winnipeg, Canada. Various event formats were included: those involving handguns, rifles, and shotguns (trap). Events for both men and women were held.

== Men's events ==
Event	Gold	Silver	Bronze
10 metre air pistol	Daryl Szarenski; United States	Felipe Beuvrín; Venezuela	Jason Meidinger; United States
10 metre air rifle	Ken Johnson; United States	Glenn Dubis; United States	Wayne Sorensen; Canada
10 metre running target	Attila Solti; Guatemala	Armando Ayala; United States	Andrés Felipe Torres; Colombia
25 metre rapid fire pistol	Daniel César Felizia; Argentina	John McNally; United States	Bernardo Tovar; Colombia
50 metre pistol	Jason Meidinger; United States	Daryl Szarenski; United States	Norbelis Bárzaga; Cuba
50 metre rifle prone	Matthew Emmons; United States	Wayne Sorensen; Canada	Henry Gerow; Canada
50 metre rifle three positions	Ken Johnson; United States	Pablo Álvarez; Argentina	Roberto José Elias; Mexico
Trap	Danilo Caro; Colombia	Lance Rade; United States	George Leary; Canada
Double Trap	Lance Rade; United States	Charles Redding; United States	Luis Graça; Brazil
Skeet	Juan Rodríguez; Cuba	William Roy; United States	Clayton Miller; Canada

== Women's events ==
Event	Gold	Silver	Bronze
10 metre air pistol	Kim Eagles; Canada	María Franco; Venezuela	Margarita Tarradell; Cuba
10 metre air rifle	Jayme Dickman; United States	Sharon Bowes; Canada	Amelia Rosa Fournel; Argentina
25 metre pistol	Elizabeth Callahan; United States	Rebecca Snyder; United States	María Rueda; Colombia
50 metre rifle three positions	Jayme Dickman; United States	Nancy Johnson; United States	Christina Ashcroft; Canada

== Medal table ==
Place	Nation	Gold medal	Silver medal	Bronze medal	Total
1	United States	9	9	1	19
2	Canada	1	2	5	8
3	Argentina	1	1	1	3
4	Colombia	1	0	3	4
5	Cuba	1	0	2	3
6	Guatemala	1	0	0	1
7	Venezuela	0	2	0	2
8	Mexico	0	0	1	1
8	Brazil	0	0	1	1
Total		14	14	14	42
