= Shooting at the 2000 Summer Olympics – Men's 10 metre air rifle =

Sports shooting at the Olympics

Men's 10 metre air rifle at the Games of the XXVII Olympiad
- Venue: Sydney International Shooting Centre
- Date: 18 September 2000
- Competitors: 46 from 33 nations
- Winning score: 696.4 (OR)

Medalists
1st place, gold medalist(s)		Cai Yalin	China
2nd place, silver medalist(s)		Artem Khadjibekov	Russia
3rd place, bronze medalist(s)		Yevgeni Aleinikov	Russia

The men's 10 metre air rifle competition at the 2000 Summer Olympics was held on 18 September.

== Records ==
Prior to this competition, the existing world and Olympic records were as follows.

Qualification records
World record	Tevarit Majchacheep (THA)	600	Langkawi, Malaysia	27 January 2000
Olympic record	Wolfram Waibel (AUT)	596	Atlanta, United States	22 July 1996

Final records
World record	Jason Parker (USA)	700.6	Munich, Germany	23 May 1998
Olympic record	Artem Khadjibekov (RUS)	695.7	Atlanta, United States	22 July 1996

== Qualification round ==
Rank	Athlete	Country	Score	Notes
1	Cai Yalin	China	594	Q
2	Anatoli Klimenko	Belarus	593	Q
3	Jason Parker	United States	592	Q
4	Artur Ayvazyan	Ukraine	592	Q
5	Artem Khadjibekov	Russia	592	Q
6	Yevgeni Aleinikov	Russia	592	Q
7	Leif Steinar Rolland	Norway	592	Q
8	Nedžad Fazlija	Bosnia and Herzegovina	591	Q (6th: 99)
9	Rajmond Debevec	Slovenia	591	(6th: 98)
9	Mario Knögler	Austria	591	(6th: 98)
11	Mohamed Abdel Ellah	Egypt	590	
11	Abhinav Bindra	India	590	
11	Jozef Gönci	Slovakia	590	
11	Lim Young-sueb	South Korea	590	
15	Norbert Ettner	Germany	589	
15	Yuri Lomov	Kyrgyzstan	589	
15	Péter Sidi	Hungary	589	
18	Jean-Pierre Amat	France	588	
18	Thomas Farnik	Austria	588	
18	Juha Hirvi	Finland	588	
18	Lee Eun-chul	South Korea	588	
18	Tevarit Majchacheep	Thailand	588	
18	Oleg Mykhaylov	Ukraine	588	
18	Georgy Nekhaev	Belarus	588	
18	Wayne Sorensen	Canada	588	
18	Wolfram Waibel	Austria	588	
27	Marco De Nicolo	Italy	587	
27	Roger Hansson	Sweden	587	
27	Nemanja Mirosavljev	FR Yugoslavia	587	
27	Robert Wieland	Australia	587	
31	Pablo Álvarez	Argentina	586	
31	Franck Badiou	France	586	
31	Dick Boschman	Netherlands	586	
34	Václav Bečvář	Czech Republic	585	
34	Espen Berg-Knutsen	Norway	585	
34	Masaru Yanagida	Japan	585	
37	Ferdinand Stipberger	Germany	584	
38	Roberto Jose Elias Orozco	Mexico	583	
38	Kenneth Johnson	United States	583	
38	Stevan Pletikosić	FR Yugoslavia	583	
41	Oliver Geissmann	Liechtenstein	582	
41	Timothy Lowndes	Australia	582	
43	Radim Novák	Czech Republic	581	
44	Hilal Al Rasheedi	Oman	579	
45	Varavut Majchacheep	Thailand	575	
46	Walter Martínez	Nicaragua	571	
	Jorge González	Spain		DNS
	Hou Yannan	China		DNS

DNS Did not start – Q Qualified for final

== Final ==
Rank	Athlete	Qual	Final	Total	Notes
1st place, gold medalist(s)	Cai Yalin (CHN)	594	102.4	696.4	OR
2nd place, silver medalist(s)	Artem Khadjibekov (RUS)	592	103.1	695.1	
3rd place, bronze medalist(s)	Yevgeni Aleinikov (RUS)	592	101.8	693.8	
4	Anatoli Klimenko (BLR)	593	100.4	693.4	
5	Jason Parker (USA)	592	101.1	693.1	
6	Nedžad Fazlija (BIH)	591	101.7	692.7	
7	Leif Steinar Rolland (NOR)	592	100.2	692.2	
8	Artur Ayvazyan (UKR)	592	100.0	692.0	

OR Olympic record

== Sources ==
- Official Report of the XXVII Olympiad — Shooting (PDF).
