= Goldobin =

Goldobin (Russian: Голдобин) is a Russian masculine surname originating either from goldoba (meaning beggar) or from голдобина (meaning a pit); its feminine counterpart is Goldobina. It may refer to

- Nikolay Goldobin (born 1995), Russian ice hockey right winger
- Tatiana Goldobina (born 1975), Russian sports shooter
