= Pogrebnyak =

Pogrebnyak (Ukrainian: Погрібняк, romanized: Pohribnyak, Russian: Погребняк, romanized: Pogrebnyak, Belarusian: Пагрэбняк, romanized: Pahrebniak, Serbian: Погребњак, romanized: Pogrebnjak) is an East Slavic surname of complete Cossack origins was first mentioned on the historical Cossack registers as of the 17th century. Notable persons with that name include:

- Andriy Pogrebnyak (born 1988), Ukrainian foil fencer
- Kirill Pogrebnyak (born 1992), Russian football player
- Olga Pogrebnyak (born 1973), Belarusian sport shooter
- Pavel Pogrebnyak (born 1983), Russian football player
- Valeriya Pogrebnyak (born 1998), Russian tennis player
