= Antolin =

Antolin may refer to:

== Places ==
- Antolin, Łódź Voivodeship, central Poland
- Antolin, Gmina Konstantynów, Biała County, Lublin Voivodeship, eastern Poland
- Antolin, Janów County, Lublin Voivodeship, eastern Poland
- Paso Antolín, a village in Colonia Department, Uruguay

== People ==
- Antolin (name)
- San Antolin

== Other uses ==
- Antolin (software), a German web-based programme for promotion of reading in schools
- Grupo Antolin, a Spanish automotive interiors company
