= Wang Xian =

Wang Xian may refer to:

- Wang Xian (sport shooter) (1978-), Chinese sport shooter who competed in the 2000 Summer Olympics
- Wáng Xī' An (1944-2024), Chinese martial arts practitioner and teacher of the Chen-style tai chi
