= José Antolín Toledano =

Spanish industrialist (1936–2022)

José Antolín Toledano (19 June 1936 – 26 May 2022) was a Spanish industrialist.

== Biography ==
Antolín was born in Quintana del Puente, Palencia, Spain, and spent his whole professional career in the automotive industry. He became Chairman of Grupo Antolín, a Spanish family-owned multinational company that designs and manufactures interior automotive components, in 1995. In February 2015, after 50 years with the company, Antolín stepped down to become Chairman emeritus, while his nephew, Ernesto Antolín, became the new Chairman of Grupo Antolín.
