= Shooting at the 1996 Summer Olympics – Women's double trap =

Sports shooting at the Olympics

Women's double trap at the Games of the XXVI Olympiad
- Venue: Wolf Creek Shooting Complex
- Date: 23 July 1996
- Competitors: 21 from 14 nations
- Winning score: 141 (OR)

Medalists
1st place, gold medalist(s)		Kim Rhode	United States
2nd place, silver medalist(s)		Susanne Kiermayer	Germany
3rd place, bronze medalist(s)		Deserie Huddleston	Australia

Women's double trap shooting made its first appearance at the 1996 Summer Olympics, with Kim Rhode becoming the inaugural champion. Susanne Kiermayer defeated Deserie Huddleston in the silver medal shoot-off.

== Qualification round ==
Rank	Athlete	Country	A	B	C	Total	Shoot-off	Notes
1	Kim Rhode	United States	36	37	35	108		Q OR
2	Riitta-Mari Murtoniemi	Finland	35	38	34	107		Q
3	Yoshiko Kira	Japan	33	35	37	105		Q
4	Theresa DeWitt	United States	34	37	34	105		Q
5	Susanne Kiermayer	Germany	37	36	32	105		Q
6	Deserie Huddleston	Australia	34	34	35	103	8	Q
7	Annmaree Roberts	Australia	35	36	32	103	7	
8	Gao E	China	32	35	36	103	6	
9	Giovanna Pasello	Italy	36	33	34	103	3	
10	Daina Gudzinevičiūtė	Lithuania	32	35	34	101		
11	Satu Pusila	Finland	34	34	32	100		
11	María Quintanal	Spain	29	37	34	100		
11	Xu Xiang	China	32	33	35	100		
14	Muriel Bernard	France	34	35	29	98		
15	Deborah Gelisio	Italy	37	34	26	97		
15	Cynthia Meyer	Canada	31	38	28	97		
17	Svetlana Demina	Russia	32	30	33	95		
17	Lee Sang-hui	South Korea	31	35	29	95		
19	Yelena Rabaya	Russia	35	31	27	93		
20	Anne Focan	Belgium	35	27	29	91		
21	Gemma Usieto	Spain	32	30	28	90		

OR Olympic record – Q Qualified for final

== Final ==
Rank	Athlete	Qual	Final	Total	Shoot-off	Notes
1st place, gold medalist(s)	Kim Rhode (USA)	108	33	141		OR
2nd place, silver medalist(s)	Susanne Kiermayer (GER)	105	34	139	2	
3rd place, bronze medalist(s)	Deserie Huddleston (AUS)	103	36	139	1	
4	Theresa DeWitt (USA)	105	32	137		
5	Riitta-Mari Murtoniemi (FIN)	107	26	133		
6	Yoshiko Kira (JPN)	105	27	132		

OR Olympic record

== Sources ==
- Olympic Report Atlanta 1996 Volume III: The Competition Results (PDF).
