= Valérie Bellenoue =

French sports shooter

Personal information
- Full name: Valérie Bellenoue
- Nationality: France
- Born: 27 March 1975 (age 51) Schiltigheim, France
- Height: 1.69 m (5 ft 6 1/2 in)
- Weight: 59 kg (130 lb)

Sport
- Sport: Shooting
- Events: 10 m air rifle (AR40); 50 m rifle 3 positions (STR3X20)
- Club: Girondins de Bordeaux
- Coached by: Gilles Muller (national)
Medal record
Women's shooting
Representing France
European Championships
Gold medal – first place	1995 Vantaa	AR40
Gold medal – first place	2000 Munich	AR40

Valérie Bellenoue (born 27 March 1975, in Schiltigheim) is a French sport shooter. She has competed for France in rifle shooting at three Olympics (1996 to 2004), and has been close to an Olympic medal on her debut in 1996 (finishing fourth in the air rifle). Outside her Olympic career, Bellenoue has won a total of fourteen medals in a major international competition, spanning the World and European Championships and the ISSF World Cup series.

== Career ==
Bellenoue started out as a successful 19-year-old junior in 1994, when she became the World champion in air rifle shooting at Milan, Italy. Two years later, Bellenoue made her first French team at the 1996 Summer Olympics in Atlanta, where she finished fourth in the 10 m air rifle with a score of 496.6, having been close to an Olympic medal by just a slim 0.6-point margin.

Shortly after her Olympic debut, Bellenoue's rapid improvement arose when she recorded a brilliant 499.0 to take her first ever air rifle title at the 1997 ISSF World Cup final in Lugano, Switzerland.

In early 2000, Bellenoue reached the peak of her shooting career by improving her personal best at 499.6 to claim her second individual gold at the European Championships, and then denied the rest of the field for another World Cup title in Munich, Germany with an outstanding record of 500.3 points.

Bellenoue's noteworthy achievements had culminated her in a selection of being one of favorites vying for the Olympic medal in the 10 m air rifle at her succeeding Games in Sydney 2000, but she slumped out of the final round to an eight-way tie for twentieth place with a qualifying score of 391 points. Bellenoue also competed in the 50 m rifle 3 positions, where she found some relief from her troubled air rifle feat by shooting a total of 575 (194 in prone, 189 in standing, and 192 in the kneeling series) to finish jointly with Germany's 1996 Olympic silver medalist Petra Horneber and Switzerland's Oriana Scheuss in seventeenth position.

At the 2004 Summer Olympics in Athens, Bellenoue qualified for her third French team, as a 29-year-old, in rifle shooting. She had registered a minimum qualifying score of 396 to secure an Olympic berth for France from her outside-final finish at the World Championships two years earlier. In the 10 m air rifle, held on the first day of the Games, Bellenoue fired a modest 392 out of a possible 400 to force in a massive draw with six others for twenty-second place. Nearly a week later, in the 50 m rifle 3 positions, Bellenoue marked a brilliant 198 in prone, and 188 each in both standing and kneeling series to close her Olympic run out of the final in the sixteenth position with a total of 574 points.

== Olympic results ==
Event	1996	2000	2004
50 metre rifle three positions	—N/a	17th 575	16th 574
10 metre air rifle	4th 395+101.6	20th 391	22nd 392
