= Lindy Hansen =

Norwegian sports shooter (born 1969)

Lindy Hansen (born 15 April 1969 in Sarpsborg) is a Norwegian sport shooter. She competed in rifle shooting events at the Summer Olympics in 1992, 1996, and 2000.

== Olympic results ==
| Event | 1992 | 1996 | 2000 |
|---|---|---|---|
| 50 metre rifle three positions (women) | 35th | T-12th | T-9th |
| 10 metre air rifle (women) | 44th | T-25th | T-9th |
