= Robert Wieland =

Australian sports shooter

Robert Wieland (born 4 September 1974 in Melbourne) is an Australian sport shooter. He tied for 27th place in the men's 10 metre air rifle event at the 2000 Summer Olympics.
