= Chng Seng Mok =

Singaporean sports shooter

Personal information
- Nationality: Singaporean
- Born: 21 August 1950 Singapore, Singapore
- Died: 26 September 2015 (aged 65) Singapore, Singapore

Sport
- Sport: Sports shooting
Medal record
Men's shooting
Representing Singapore
Asian Games
Bronze medal – third place	1990 Beijing	Trap
Bronze medal – third place	1998 Bangkok	Double trap team
SEA Games
Gold medal – first place	1989 Kuala Lumpur	Team skeet
Gold medal – first place	1995 Chiang Mai	Team trap

Chng Seng Mok (Chinese: 庄承睦; pinyin: Zhuāng Chéngmù; 21 August 1950 – 26 September 2015) was a Singaporean sports shooter. He competed in the mixed trap event at the 1992 Summer Olympics. He was the flag bearer of the Singaporean team at the opening ceremony of the 1992 Summer Olympics.

Chng won an individual trap bronze medal at the 1990 Asian Games, despite only taking on the sports three years ago. The achievement also led to Chng being named Singapore's 1990 Sportsman of the Year. Eight years later, Chng won his second Asian Games medal, securing bronze in the double trap team event alongside Lee Wung Yew and Tan Chee Keong, and helping Singapore earn its first medal of the Games. At the SEA Games, he won a team skeet gold medal in 1989 and team trap gold medal in 1995.

Outside sports, Chng was known as the managing director of Poh Heng Jewellery, which was founded by his father Chng Tok Ngam.
