= Marina Grigoryeva =

Russian sports shooter

Personal information
- Nationality: Russian
- Born: 10 July 1973 (age 51); Moscow, Russia

Sport
- Sport: Sports shooting

Marina Grigoryeva (born 10 July 1973) is a Russian sports shooter. She competed in the women's 10 metre air rifle event at the 1996 Summer Olympics.
