= Lucie Valová =

Czech sport shooter

Lucie Valová (born 10 December 1981 in Ostrava) is a Czech sport shooter. She competed at the 2000 Summer Olympics in the women's 50 metre rifle three positions event, in which she tied for 14th place, and the women's 10 metre air rifle event, in which she tied for 36th place.
