= Divna Pešić =

Macedonian sports shooter

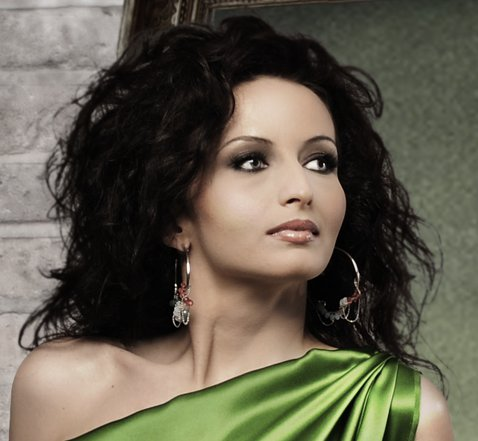

Personal information
- Full name: Divna Pešić
- Nationality: North Macedonia
- Born: 22 September 1979 (age 47) Kavadarci, SR Macedonia, SFR Yugoslavia
- Height: 1.76 m (5 ft 9 1/2 in)
- Weight: 57 kg (126 lb)

Sport
- Sport: Shooting
- Events: 10 m air rifle (AR40); 50 m rifle 3 positions (STR3X20)
- Club: Kavadarci
- Coached by: Blagoj Pešić

Divna Pešić (Macedonian: Дивна Пешиќ; born 22 September 1979 in Kavadarci) is a Macedonian sport shooter. She has been selected to compete for the Republic of Macedonia in two editions of the Olympic Games (2000 and 2004), finishing outside the top 30 in both air and small-bore rifle shooting. Pesic trains at a shooting club in Kavadarci under her father and longtime coach Blagoj Pešić.

Pešić's Olympic debut came as a 20-year-old at the 2000 Summer Olympics in Sydney. There, she finished in a two-way tie with Philippine shooter Rasheya Jasmin Luis for forty-fourth place in the 10 m air rifle, posting a qualifying score of 384. In the 50 m rifle 3 positions, Pešić came up with a much sufficient aim to obtain a total of 561 points (190 each in prone and standing and 181 in the kneeling series) in the qualifying round, vaulting her up to thirty-sixth.

At the 2004 Summer Olympics in Athens, Pešić qualified as a lone markswoman for her second Macedonian team in rifle shooting. She had been granted an Olympic invitation for her country by ISSF and IOC, having registered a minimum qualifying standard of 382 in air rifle at the ISSF World Cup meet in Zagreb, Croatia a year earlier. In the 10 m air rifle, held on the first day of the Games, Pešić fired an ill-fated 368 out of a possible 400 to round off the 44-shooter field in last place. Nearly a week later, in the 50 m rifle 3 positions, Pešić marked 188 in prone, a substandard 182 in standing, and 185 in the kneeling series to accumulate a total score of 555 points in the qualifying round, closing her out of the final to a two-way tie with Australia's Kim Frazer for thirty-second place.

She is of Serbian descent through her grandparents who moved from Serbia to Kavardarci.
