= Jin Soon-young =

South Korean sports shooter

Personal information
- Nationality: South Korean
- Born: 20 June 1971 (age 54)

Sport
- Sport: Sports shooting

Jin Soon-young (born 20 June 1971) is a South Korean sports shooter. She competed in the women's 10 metre air rifle event at the 1996 Summer Olympics.
