= Wayne Sorensen =

Canadian sports shooter

Personal information
- Born: July 8, 1963 (age 62) Calgary, Alberta, Canada

Sport
- Sport: Sport shooting
Medal record
Representing Canada
Commonwealth Games
Gold medal – first place	1994 Victoria	10m air rifle
Gold medal – first place	1994 Victoria	50m rifle 3 positions pairs
Gold medal – first place	1998 Kuala Lumpur	50m rifle 3 positions pairs
Silver medal – second place	1994 Victoria	50m rifle 3 positions
Silver medal – second place	1998 Kuala Lumpur	50m rifle 3 positions
Pan American Games
Silver medal – second place	1995 Mar del Plata	10m air rifle team
Silver medal – second place	1999 Winnipeg	50m rifle prone
Bronze medal – third place	1999 Winnipeg	10m air rifle

Wayne Thomas Sorensen (born July 8, 1963) is a Canadian sport shooter. He competed in rifle shooting events at the Summer Olympics in 1992 and 2000. He is the son of Arne Sorensen who was also a sport shooter.

== Olympic results ==
Event	1992	2000
50 metre rifle three positions (men)	T-26th	42nd
50 metre rifle prone (men)	—	T-10th
10 metre air rifle (men)	—	T-18th
