= Sue Banks =

Australian sports shooter

Personal information
- Nationality: Australian
- Born: 7 February 1972 (age 53); Adelaide, Australia

Sport
- Sport: Sports shooting

Sue Banks (born 7 February 1972) is an Australian sports shooter. She competed in the women's 10 metre air rifle event at the 1996 Summer Olympics.
