= Bivaswari Rai =

Nepalese sports shooter

Personal information
- Nationality: Nepalese
- Born: 25 March 1970 (age 54)

Sport
- Sport: Sports shooting

Bivaswari Rai (born 25 March 1970) is a Nepalese sports shooter. She competed in the women's 10 metre air rifle event at the 1996 Summer Olympics.
