= Irina Gerasimenok =

Russian sport shooter

Medal record

Women's shooting

Representing Russia

Olympic Games
Silver medal – second place	1996 Atlanta	50 m rifle three positions

World Championships
Bronze medal – third place	1994 Milan	50 m rifle three positions

Irina Aleksandrovna Gerasimenok (Russian: Ирина Александровна Герасимёнок), (born 6 October 1970) is a Russian sport shooter, specializing in the rifles event. She won the silver medal at the 1996 Olympic Games in the 50 metre rifle three positions event.

== Olympic results ==
Event	1996
50 metre rifle three positions	(silver) Silver; 585+95.1
