= Natalija Prednik =

Slovenian sport shooter

Natalija Prednik (born February 25, 1973, in Maribor) is a Slovenian sport shooter. She tied for 20th place in the women's 10 metre air rifle event at the 2000 Summer Olympics.
