= Iris Kremer-Roseneck =

Luxembourgish sports shooter

Personal information
- Nationality: Luxembourgish
- Born: 25 July 1967 (age 57)

Sport
- Sport: Sports shooting

Iris Kremer-Roseneck (born 25 July 1967) is a Luxembourgish sports shooter. She competed in the women's 10 metre air rifle event at the 1996 Summer Olympics.
