= Marina Pons =

Spanish sports shooter

Marina Pons (born October 18, 1977 in Barcelona, Spain) is a Spanish sport shooter. She competed at the 2000 Summer Olympics in the women's 50 metre rifle three positions event, in which she placed 34th, and the women's 10 metre air rifle event, in which she tied for 36th place.
