= Kim Bong-chol =

North Korean sports shooter (born 1968)

Personal information
- Nationality: North Korean
- Born: 16 June 1968 (age 58)

Sport
- Sport: Sports shooting
Medal record
Men's shooting
Representing North Korea
Asian Games
Bronze medal – third place	1990 Beijing	Standard pistol

Kim Bong-chol (Korean: 김봉철; born 16 June 1968) is a North Korean sports shooter. He competed in the men's 25 metre rapid fire pistol event at the 1992 Summer Olympics.
