= Oksana Kovtonovich =

Belarusian sports shooter

Oksana Kovtonovich (born September 26, 1977) is a Belarusian sport shooter. She tied for 32nd place in the women's 10 metre air rifle event at the 2000 Summer Olympics.
