= Won Gyeong-suk =

South Korean sports shooter

Personal information
- Nationality: South Korean
- Born: 28 March 1976 (age 48)

Sport
- Sport: Sports shooting

Won Gyeong-suk (born 28 March 1976) is a South Korean sports shooter. She competed in the women's 50 metre rifle three positions event at the 1996 Summer Olympics.
