= Hilal Al Rasheedi =

Omani sport shooter

Hilal Al Rasheedi (born January 1, 1963, in Al-Tawiyah) is an Omani sport shooter. He competed at the 2000 Summer Olympics in the men's 50 metre rifle prone event, in which he tied for 25th place, and the men's 10 metre air rifle event, in which he placed 44th.
