= Rhona Barry =

Irish sports shooter

Personal information
- Nationality: Irish
- Born: 24 August 1968 (age 56); Louth, Ireland

Sport
- Sport: Sports shooting

Rhona Barry (born 24 August 1968) is an Irish sports shooter. She competed in the women's 10 metre air rifle event at the 1996 Summer Olympics.
