= Cindy Bouque =

Belgian sports shooter

Personal information
- Born: 12 April 1975; Ghent, East Flanders, Belgium

Sport
- Sport: Shooting

Cindy Bouque (born 12 April 1975) is a former Belgian female shooter. She represented Belgium at the 1996 Summer Olympics and competed at the Women's 10 metre air rifle shooting event.
