= Eunice Caballero =

Cuban sport shooter

Personal information
- Born: January 1, 1973 (age 53)

Sport
- Sport: Sport shooting
Medal record
Representing Cuba
Pan American Games
Silver medal – second place	1995 Mar del Plata	10m air rifle team
Central American and Caribbean Games
Gold medal – first place	1993 Ponce	50m rifle 3 positions
Gold medal – first place	1993 Ponce	50m rifle prone
Silver medal – second place	1993 Ponce	10m air rifle

Eunice Esther Caballero (born January 1, 1973) is a Cuban sport shooter. She competed at the 2000 Summer Olympics in the women's 50 metre rifle three positions event, in which she tied for 30th place, and the women's 10 metre air rifle event, in which she tied for 36th place.
