= Maria Feklistova =

Russian sport shooter

Olympic medal record

Women's Shooting
| Bronze medal – third place | 2000 Sydney | Small-bore Rifle, 3 Positions |

Maria Feklistova (born 12 May 1976) is a Russian sport shooter and Olympic medalist. She won a bronze medal in women's 50 metre rifle three positions at the 2000 Summer Olympics in Sydney.
