= Thrine Kane =

American sports shooter

Thrine Kane (born May 24, 1981, in Rockville Centre, New York) is an American sport shooter. She placed 35th in the women's 50 metre rifle three positions event at the 2000 Summer Olympics.
