= Tetyana Nesterova =

Ukrainian sport shooter

Tetyana Nesterova (born May 12, 1969) is a Ukrainian sport shooter. She competed at the 1996 Summer Olympics in the women's 50 metre rifle three positions event, in which she placed eighth, and the women's 10 metre air rifle event, in which she tied for 29th place.
