= Aranka Binder =

Serbian sports shooter (born 1966)

Personal information
- Born: 19 June 1966 (age 60) Sombor, SR Serbia, SFR Yugoslavia
Medal record
Women's Shooting
Olympic Games
Competed as an Independent Olympic Participants
Bronze medal – third place	1992 Barcelona	10 m Air Rifle
Mediterranean Games
Representing Serbia and Montenegro
Bronze medal – third place	2005 Almería	10 m Air Rifle

Aranka Binder (Serbian Cyrillic: Аранка Биндер; born 19 June 1966) is a Serbian sport shooter of Hungarian ethnicity. She won a bronze medal in Women's Air Rifle in the 1992 Summer Olympics.

Olympic results
Event	1992	1996	2000
50 metre rifle three positions	—	22nd 574	23rd 572
10 metre air rifle	(bronze) Bronze; 393+102.1	9th 393	15th 392
