= Anni Bissø =

Danish sport shooter (born 1969)

Anni Bissø (born April 30, 1969 in Tranebjerg) is a Danish sport shooter. She competed in rifle shooting events at the 1996 and 2000 Summer Olympics.

== Olympic results ==
| Event | 1996 | 2000 |
|---|---|---|
| 50 meter rifle three positions (women) | T-22nd | 6th |
| 10 meter air rifle (women) | T-31st | T-20th |
