= Marta Nedvědová =

Czech sport shooter

Marta Nedvědová (born 8 December 1976 in Prague) is a Czech sport shooter. She competed at the 1996 Summer Olympics in the women's 50 metre rifle three positions event, in which she tied for twelfth place, and the women's 10 metre air rifle event, in which she placed sixth.
