= Mladenka Malenica =

Croatian sports shooter

Mladenka Malenica (born 26 May 1972 in Split) is a Croatian sport shooter. She competed in rifle shooting events at the Summer Olympics in 1988, 1996, and 2000.

== Olympic results ==
Event	1988	1996	2000
50 metre rifle three positions (women)	T-28th	28th	T-26th
10 metre air rifle (women)	T-22nd	T-20th	T-9th
