= Carole Couesnon =

French sports shooter

Personal information
- Nationality: French
- Born: 13 May 1975 (age 49); Alfortville, France

Sport
- Sport: Sports shooting

Carole Couesnon (born 13 May 1975) is a French sports shooter. She competed in the women's 10 metre air rifle event at the 1996 Summer Olympics.
