= Oriana Scheuss =

Swiss sports shooter

Personal information
- Born: July 2, 1972 (age 53) Teufen, Appenzell Ausserrhoden, Switzerland

Sport
- Country: Switzerland

Achievements and titles
- Olympic finals: Shooting at the 2000 Summer Olympics – Women's 50 metre rifle three positions (17th); Shooting at the 2000 Summer Olympics – Women's 10 metre air rifle (36th)

Oriana Scheuss (born 7 February 1972) is a Swiss sport shooter. She competed at the 2000 Summer Olympics in the women's 50 metre rifle three positions event, in which she tied for 17th place, and the women's 10 metre air rifle event, in which she tied for 36th place.
