= Melissa Mulloy =

American sport shooter

Personal information
- Born: March 16, 1978 (age 48) Danvers, Massachusetts, United States

Sport
- Sport: Sport shooting
Medal record
Representing United States
Pan American Games
Silver medal – second place	2003 Santo Domingo	10m air rifle

Melissa Susan Mulloy (born March 16, 1978) is an American sport shooter. She competed at the 2000 Summer Olympics in the women's 50 metre rifle three positions event, in which she placed eighth.
