= Xu Xiang (sport shooter) =

Chinese sports shooter

Personal information
- Nationality: Chinese
- Born: 29 November 1972 (age 52)

Sport
- Sport: Sports shooting

Xu Xiang (born 29 November 1972) is a Chinese sports shooter. She competed in the women's double trap event at the 1996 Summer Olympics.
