= Mohamed Abdel Ellah =

Egyptian sport shooter (born 1968)

- Born: March 7, 1968; Asyut, Egypt
- Occupation: sport shooter
- Notable work: He tied for 11th place in the men's 10 metre air rifle event at the 2000 Summer Olympics.

Mohamed Abdel Ellah (born March 7, 1968, in Asyut) is an Egyptian sport shooter. He tied for 11th place in the men's 10 metre air rifle event at the 2000 Summer Olympics.
