= Daniel Leonhard =

German sport shooter

Daniel Leonhard (born 24 December 1972) is a German sport shooter who competed in the 1996 Summer Olympics and in the 2000 Summer Olympics.
