= Anatoli Klimenko =

Belarusian sports shooter

Anatoli Klimenko (born September 2, 1963, in Karaganda) is a Belarusian sport shooter. He competed in rifle shooting events at the 1996 and 2000 Summer Olympics.

== Olympic results ==
Event	1996	2000
50 meter rifle three positions (men)	T-28th	T-25th
10 meter air rifle (men)	T-11th	4th
