= Deserie Huddleston =

Australian sport shooter (born 1960)

Medal record

Women's shooting

Representing Australia

Olympic Games
Bronze medal – third place	1996 Atlanta	Double trap

Commonwealth Games
Gold medal – first place	2006 Melbourne	Trap Pairs

Deserie Baynes (née Huddleston born 11 September 1960 in Mildura, Victoria, Australia ) is an Australian sport shooter. She won the Bronze medal in the Double trap in the 1996 Atlanta Summer Olympics.
