= Choi Dae-young =

South Korean sports shooter

Choi Dae-young (born February 10, 1982, in Seoul) is a South Korean sport shooter. She competed at the 2000 Summer Olympics in the women's 10 metre air rifle event, in which she placed seventh.
