= Kang Cho-hyun =

South Korean sport shooter

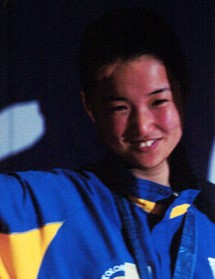
- Kang at the 2000 Summer Olympics

Personal information
- Nationality: South Korean
- Born: 23 October 1982 (age 43) Daejeon, South Korea

Sport
- Country: South Korea
- Sport: Shooting
- Event: 10 m air rifle
Medal record
Women's shooting
Representing South Korea
Olympic Games
Silver medal – second place	2000 Sydney	10 m air rifle

- Kang Cho-hyun
- Hangul: 강초현
- RR: Gang Chohyeon
- MR: Kang Ch'ohyŏn

Kang Cho-hyun (Korean: 강초현; born October 23, 1982) is a South Korean sport shooter. She won the silver medal in 10 m air rifle in the 2000 Summer Olympics in Sydney.

== Early life and education ==
Kang was born on 1982 in Daejeon, as the only daughter of Kang Hee-gyun and Kim Yang-hwa. Her father, Kang Hee-gyun, served in the 2nd Marine Division ('Blue Dragon Division') of the South Korean Marine Corps during the Vietnam War. He lost both his legs to shrapnel from a Viet Cong grenade during the war and suffered from osteomyelitis, and died in July 1999. She entered the Department of Physical Education at Korea University in November 2001 and graduated with Bachelors in Physical Education.

== Sports career ==
Kang started her shooting career in 1995, when she was a student at Yuseong Girls' Middle School in Daejeon.

In May 2000, at the 30th National Shooting Competition in South Korea, she scored a total of 86 points, finishing second behind Choi Dae-young, who scored 1592 points, and was selected as the member of the national shooting team.In July of the same year, she participated in the 2000 ISSF World Cup 4 held in Atlanta, United States, and scored 499.6 points, beating Emily Caruso of the United States by 0.1 points to win the gold medal with a world record tie. In September of that year, she competed in 10 m air rifle in the 2000 Summer Olympics in Sydney. She qualified first for the final round with 397 points, tying the previous Olympic record for qualifying. In the final, with 100.5 points, she achieved the sixth best result among the eight finalists. She finished second and won the silver medal with a total of 497.5 points.

After the Olympics, she joined the Galleria Shooting Team, which was founded by the Galleria Department Store. At the 2001 ISSF World Cup, she attained 14th place at World Cup 2 held in Seoul and 30th place at World Cup 3 held in Milan, Italy, with 390 points. She was selected as the national team again in 2003 and scored 499.2 points at the 2003 ISSF World Cup 2 held in Zagreb, Croatia. Since then, she was active as a national team player and sports commentator, and was in charge of commentating during shooting at the 2002 Asian Games and the 2004 Summer Olympics. She finished 17th at the 2006 ISSF World Cup 1 in Guangzhou, China and 80th place in World Cup 3 in Munich, Germany. Eventually, she was not selected in the national team for the future games.

In 2015, she retired from the Galleria Shooting Team. In 2021, volleyball player and sports commentator Han Yoo-mi, a close friend of Kang, claimed on the entertainment program Sporty Sisters that Kang is currently working as a shooting instructor with South Korea's National Intelligence Service.

== National honours ==
- Daejeon Sports Award (2000)
- Order of Sport Merit, Geosang Medal (2018)
