= Sabrina Sultana =

Bangladeshi sports shooter

Sabrina Sultana (born March 1, 1975) is a Bangladeshi sport shooter. She competed at the 2000 Summer Olympics in the women's 50 metre rifle three positions event, in which she placed 38th, and the women's 10 metre air rifle event, in which she placed 46th.
