= Antolín Pulido =

Spanish Marxist writer and theorist

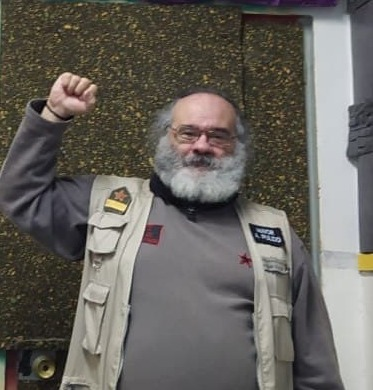
- Born: 23 October 1962 (age 63); Talavera de la Reina, Spain
- Education: University of Havana
- Occupations: Writer, radio host, human rights activist.
- Writing career
- Notable work: La memoria de los Nadie
- Military career
- Allegiance: Cuba (1970–1979); UN; SADR; Spain
- Branch: Cuban Revolutionary Army; Peace Brigades International; Sahrawi People's Liberation Army; Spanish Army
- Conflicts: Angolan Civil War; Nicaraguan Revolution; Bosnian War; Western Sahara conflict

Antolín Pulido Vázquez (born 23 October 1962) is a Spanish anarcho-communist writer, broadcaster, conflict mediator and human rights activist. He has worked in several conflict zones as a member of the Peace Brigades International.

== Early life ==
Antolín Pulido was born in 1962 in Talavera de la Reina, in the province of Toledo.

After travelling as a young man, Pulido returned to Spain in 1978 after the end of the Franco dictatorship, where he was tortured by the police in the cells of Madrid's Puerta del Sol, coming into contact with Antonio González Pacheco. After that he returned to Cuba, where he studied pedagogy, anthropology and social theater at the University of Havana. After completing his higher education, he obtained the rank of military lieutenant and became a volunteer brigadier in Angola, where he became a mayor of the Cuban army.

At the end of the 1970s, when Pulido was 17 years old, he met a Chilean woman named Jimena on the Isla de la Juventud. She was murdered while pregnant by the death flights of the Pinochet regime, after which Pulido pledged "to fight anything that means something like Jimena's murderers."

== International Brigades ==
In 1979, he participated in a meeting of the grandchildren of the International Brigades who fought during the Spanish Civil War, thus beginning his stage as a brigadier, with missions to evacuate children from conflict zones. He traveled to Nicaragua during the Nicaraguan Revolution, where he taught while "carrying a hanging Kalashnikov." He was part of a "non-existent organization" called Liberté, which did not claim his actions, working to evacuate child slaves and fight against the trafficking of organs. He wrote a trilogy describing his experiences there, entitled The Memory of Nobody, whose publication was self-financed as he could not find a Spanish publisher "because of the names and brands of weapons that appeared there".

As an international brigadista, Pulido has worked as a mediator in war conflicts in Rwanda, Sarajevo and Tindouf, participated in the evacuations of children and slaves, and assisted various NGOs in emergency situations, humanitarian aid and development cooperation. In recent years he has worked as a human rights activist, exposing child trafficking, arms trafficking and corruption through his written works. He is also the host of the radio program Cosas de los Nadie on Radio Jabato.

== Works ==
- 2016 – La memoria de los Nadie. Volumen 1. ISBN 978-84-617-5613-1 .
- 2016 – La memoria de los Nadie. Volumen 2.
- 2016 – La memoria de los Nadie. Volumen 3.
- 2019 – Teatrillos con memoria. (Teatro) Editorial Buenos Días República.
- 2019 – Textos de Combate de ahorita mismo
- Textos urgentes de cuentautar de guardia
- Panfletos de amor y lucha
- Isla Resistencia
- Justicia a traguitos carrasposos
- Nosotras
- Textos de combate de ahorita mismo
- Caramelos de acero
- Cuaderno de bitácora de Quico
- Sangre verde
