= Sabina Fuchs =

Swiss sports shooter

Personal information
- Nationality: Swiss
- Born: 4 May 1970 (age 54); Switzerland

Sport
- Sport: Sports shooting

Sabina Fuchs (born on 4 May 1970) is a Swiss sport shooter. She competed in rifle shooting events at the 1992 Summer Olympics and the 1996 Summer Olympics.

== Olympic results ==
| Event | 1992 | 1996 |
|---|---|---|
| 10 metre air rifle (women) | T-17th | T-13th |
| 50 metre rifle three positions (women) | T-17th | T-22nd |
