= Yoshiko Kira (sport shooter) =

Japanese sports shooter

Personal information
- Nationality: Japanese
- Born: 14 November 1972 (age 52)

Sport
- Sport: Sports shooting

Yoshiko Kira (born 14 November 1972) is a Japanese sports shooter. She competed in the women's double trap event at the 1996 Summer Olympics.
