= Jean Foster =

American sport shooter

Jean Foster (born October 13, 1972, in Columbus, Georgia) is an American sport shooter. She competed in rifle shooting events at the Summer Olympics in 1996 and 2000.

== Olympic results ==
Event	1996	2000
50 metre rifle three positions (women)	T-12th	T-26th
