= Jayme Dickman =

American sports shooter (born 1977)

Personal information
- Born: July 30, 1977 (age 48) South Bend, Indiana, United States

Sport
- Sport: Sport shooting
Medal record
Representing United States
Pan American Games
Gold medal – first place	1999 Winnipeg	10m air rifle
Gold medal – first place	1999 Winnipeg	50m rifle prone 3 positions

Jayme Jo Dickman (born July 30, 1977) is an American Olympic shooter. She has competed in numerous international competitions in women's air rifle and .22 rifle. She attended the 2000 Summer Olympics, representing the United States.
