= Christian Bauer (sport shooter) =

German sport shooter (born 1970)

Christian Bauer (born 29 August 1970) is a German sport shooter who competed in the 2000 Summer Olympics.
