= Yevgeni Aleinikov =

Russian sport shooter (1967–2024)

Personal information
- Born: 29 May 1967 Ordzhonikidze, North Ossetian ASSR, Russian SFSR, USSR
- Died: 7 December 2024 (aged 57)
Medal record
Men's shooting
Representing Russia
Olympic Games
Bronze medal – third place	2000 Sydney	10 m air rifle
World Championships
Bronze medal – third place	2002 Lahti	10 m air rifle

Yevgeni Vasilyevich Aleinikov (Russian: Евгений Васильевич Алейников; 29 May 1967 – 7 December 2024) was a Russian sport shooter, specializing in the rifles event. He won the bronze medal at the 2000 Olympic Games in the 10 metre air rifle event. He also competed at 1996.

Aleinikov died on 7 December 2024, at the age of 57.

== Olympic results ==
Event	1996	2000
50 metre rifle three positions	—	7th 1166+99.5
10 metre air rifle	4th 591+101.9	(bronze) Bronze; 592+101.8
