= Ken Johnson (sport shooter) =

American sports shooter

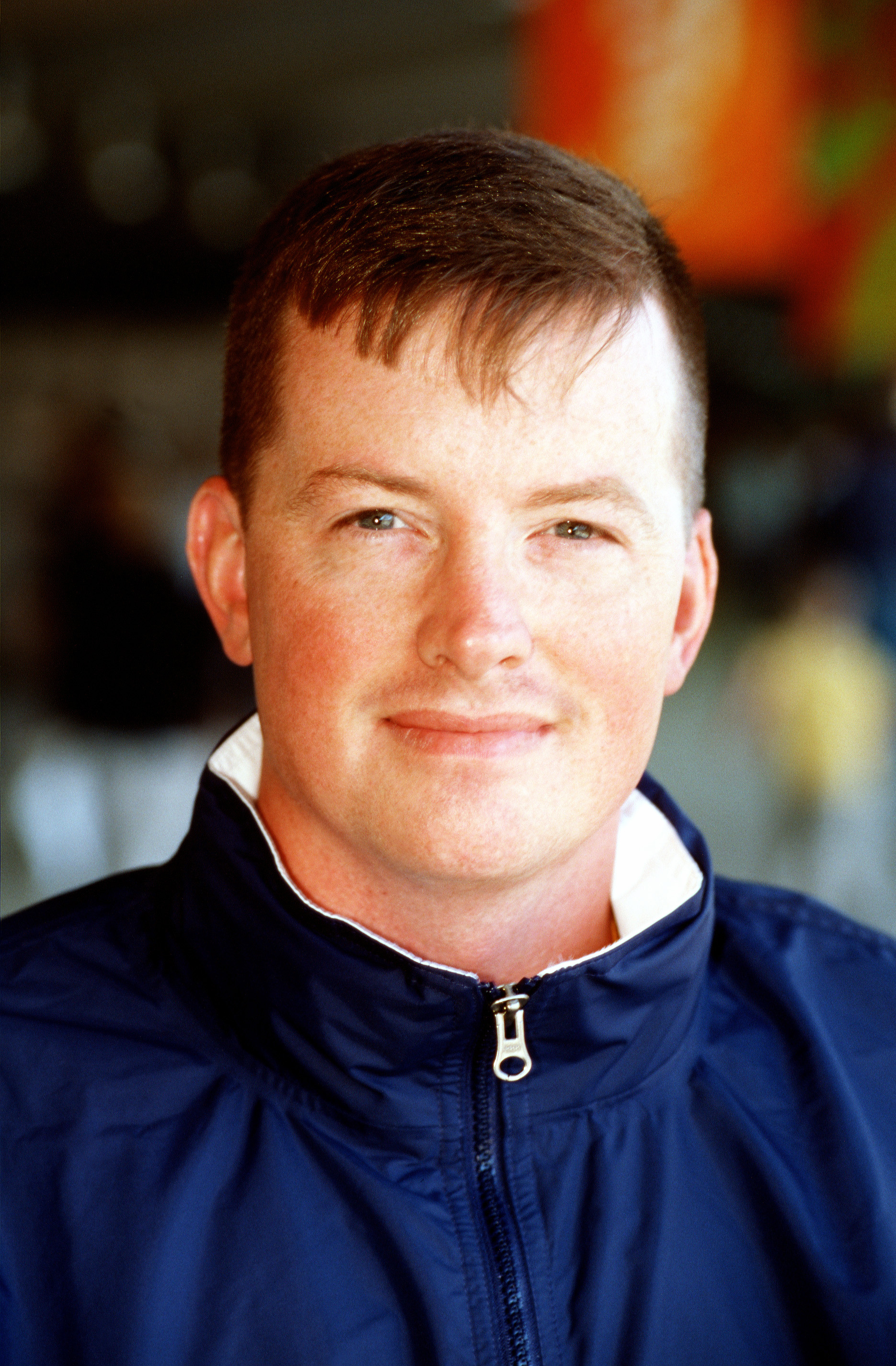
- Johnson in 2000

Personal information
- Born: Kenneth Alden Johnson; November 24, 1968 (age 57) Marshfield, Massachusetts
- Spouse: Nancy Johnson
Medal record
Representing United States
Pan American Games
Gold medal – first place	1995 Mar del Plata	10m air rifle
Gold medal – first place	1995 Mar del Plata	3 positions
Gold medal – first place	1999 Winnipeg	10m air rifle
Gold medal – first place	1999 Winnipeg	25m pistol
Bronze medal – third place	2003 Santo Domingo	25m pistol

Kenneth Alden "Ken" Johnson (born November 24, 1968) is an American sport shooter. He tied for 38th place in the men's 10 metre air rifle event at the 2000 Summer Olympics. He is the husband of Olympic gold medalist Nancy Johnson.
