= Olga Pogrebnyak =

Belarusian sport shooter

Olga Pogrebnyak (born May 24, 1973 in Minsk) is a Belarusian sport shooter. She competed in rifle shooting events at the 1996 and 2000 Summer Olympics.

== Olympic results ==
Event	1996	2000
50 metre rifle three positions (women)	T-17th	T-11th
10 metre air rifle (women)	5th	T-9th
