= Leif Rolland =

Norwegian sport shooter (born 1970)

Leif Steinar Rolland
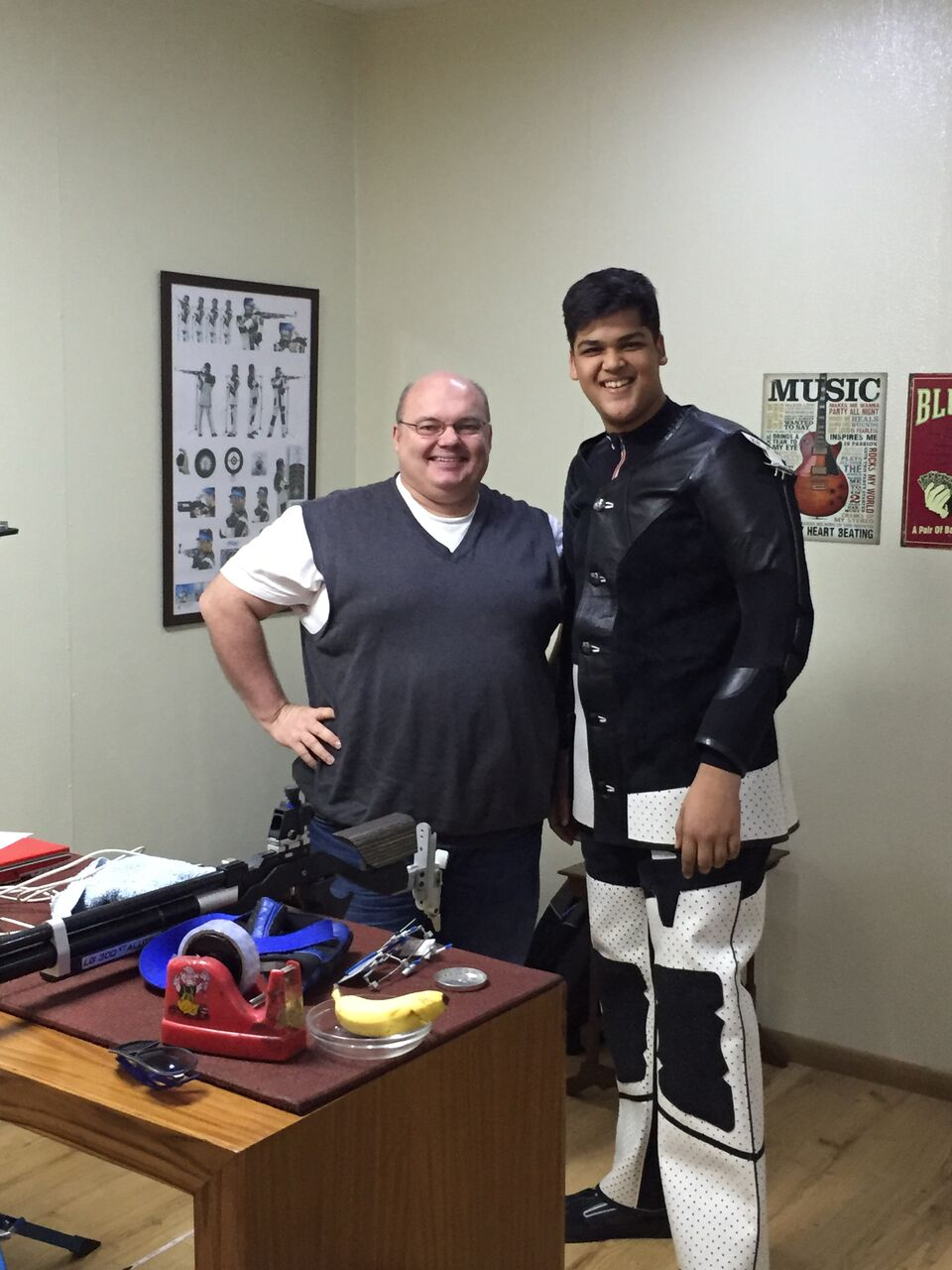
- Rolland with Pushan Jain

Personal information
- Nationality: Norway
- Citizenship: Norway
- Born: 13 December 1970 (age 54)

Leif Steinar Rolland (born 13 December 1970) is a Norwegian sport shooter. He was born in Bergen. He competed at the 1996, 2000 and 2004 Summer Olympics. He made World Record in the 10m Air Rifle category first in the 1997 Munich World Cup and then at the 2001 World Cup in Seoul. He is the former coach of the Norway (Junior, Senior & Para) shooting team. He is the coach of Indian air rifle shooter Pushan Jain.
