= Aleksandra Ivošev =

Serbian sport shooter (born 1974)

Personal information
- Full name: Aleksandra Ivošev
- Nationality: Serbian
- Born: 17 March 1974 (age 52) Novi Sad, SR Serbia, SFR Yugoslavia
- Height: 1.65 m (5 ft 5 in)
- Weight: 57 kg (126 lb)

Sport
- Country: Serbia
- Sport: Sports shooting
- Event(s): 10 metre air rifle, 50 metre rifle three positions
Medal record
Women's shooting
Representing Yugoslavia
Olympic Games
Gold medal – first place	1996 Atlanta	50 m rifle TP
Bronze medal – third place	1996 Atlanta	10 m Air rifle
European Championships
Bronze medal – third place	1996 Budapest	10 m Air rifle

Aleksandra Ivošev (Serbian Cyrillic: Александра Ивошев, born 17 March 1974) is a Serbian sport shooter. She won a gold medal in 50 metre rifle three positions and bronze in 10 m Air rifle at the 1996 Summer Olympics in Atlanta.

She was named as Yugoslav Sportswoman of The Year 1996. In 1996 she became the inaugural winner of the Golden Badge, the award for the best sportsperson of FR Yugoslavia awarded by the daily Sport.

Awards
Preceded by Aleksandar Đorđević	(Federal Republic of Yugoslavia) The Best Athlete of Yugoslavia; 1996	Succeeded by Predrag Mijatović
