= Tatiana Goldobina =

Russian sport shooter (born 1975)

Olympic medal record

Women's Shooting
| Silver medal – second place | 2000 Sydney | Small-bore Rifle, 3 Positions |

Tatiana Goldobina (Russian: Татьяна Голдобина; born 4 November 1975) is a Russian sport shooter and Olympic medalist. She received a silver medal at the 2000 Summer Olympics in Sydney.

Recipient of the Order of Friendship (2001).

== Olympic results ==
| Event | 2000 | 2004 | 2008 |
|---|---|---|---|
| 50 metre rifle three positions | (silver) Silver; 585+95.9 | 9th 578 | 18th 578 |
| 10 metre air rifle | 32nd 389 | 5th 397+102.5 | — |

== Records ==
Current world records held in 50 metre rifle three positions
| Women (CISM) | Teams | 3499 | China (Gao, Shi, Wan) | 3 June 2018 | Thun (SUI) |
