= Grupo Antolin =

Spanish manufacturer of automotive parts

Grupo Antolín
- Company type: Private company
- Industry: Automotive
- Founded: 1950
- Headquarters: Burgos, Spain
- Number of locations: 150 (2019)
- Area served: 25 Countries
- Key people: Ernesto Antolín, Chairman
- Products: Automotive
- Revenue: M€ 5,037 (2017)
- Number of employees: 28,000 (2018)
- Website: www.grupoantolin.com

Antolin is a manufacturer in the car interiors market internationally and a worldwide supplier of headliner substrates. It had started its business as a mechanics garage for vehicle and agriculture machinery repairs in Burgos, Spain, and was run by Avelino Antolín López and his sons Avelino and José.

Antolin also develops, manufactures, and tests interior parts such as overheads, doors, lighting, cockpits, consoles, and hard and soft trim.

On 31 August 2015, the company announced the acquisition of Magna Interiors, the interiors business of Magna International. Grupo Antolín acquired an automobile parts manufacturing plant in Nashville, Illinois, originally established in 1987 as Ligma Corporation, a joint venture between Magna International and Lignotock of West Germany.

The company won the Castilla y León Prize for Scientific and Technical Research and Innovation in 2017, awarded by the Junta de Castilla y León.

In 2018, it opened its 15th plant in the US in Shelby (Michigan) dedicated to manufacturing door panels for the RAM vans of the FCA group, adding to its American workforce of 5,700 people. An additional plant was announced to open in Alabama.

In May 2022, Ramón Sotomayor was the chief executive officer of Antolin.
