= Renata Mauer =

Polish sport shooter (born 1969)

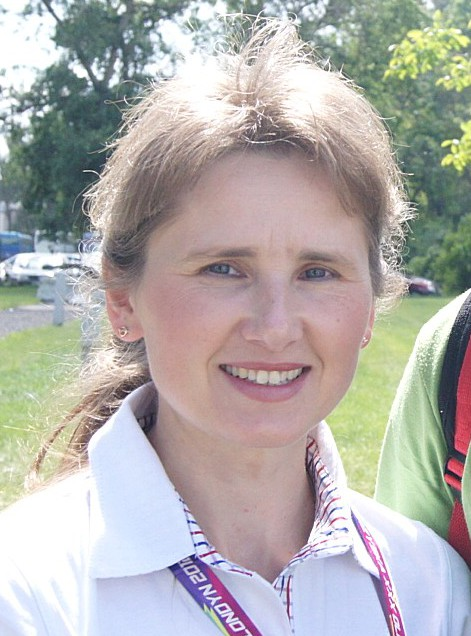
- Renata Mauer

Medal record

Women's shooting

Representing Poland

Olympic Games
Gold medal – first place	1996 Atlanta	10 m air rifle
Gold medal – first place	2000 Sydney	50 m rifle 3 pos
Bronze medal – third place	1996 Atlanta	50 m rifle 3 pos

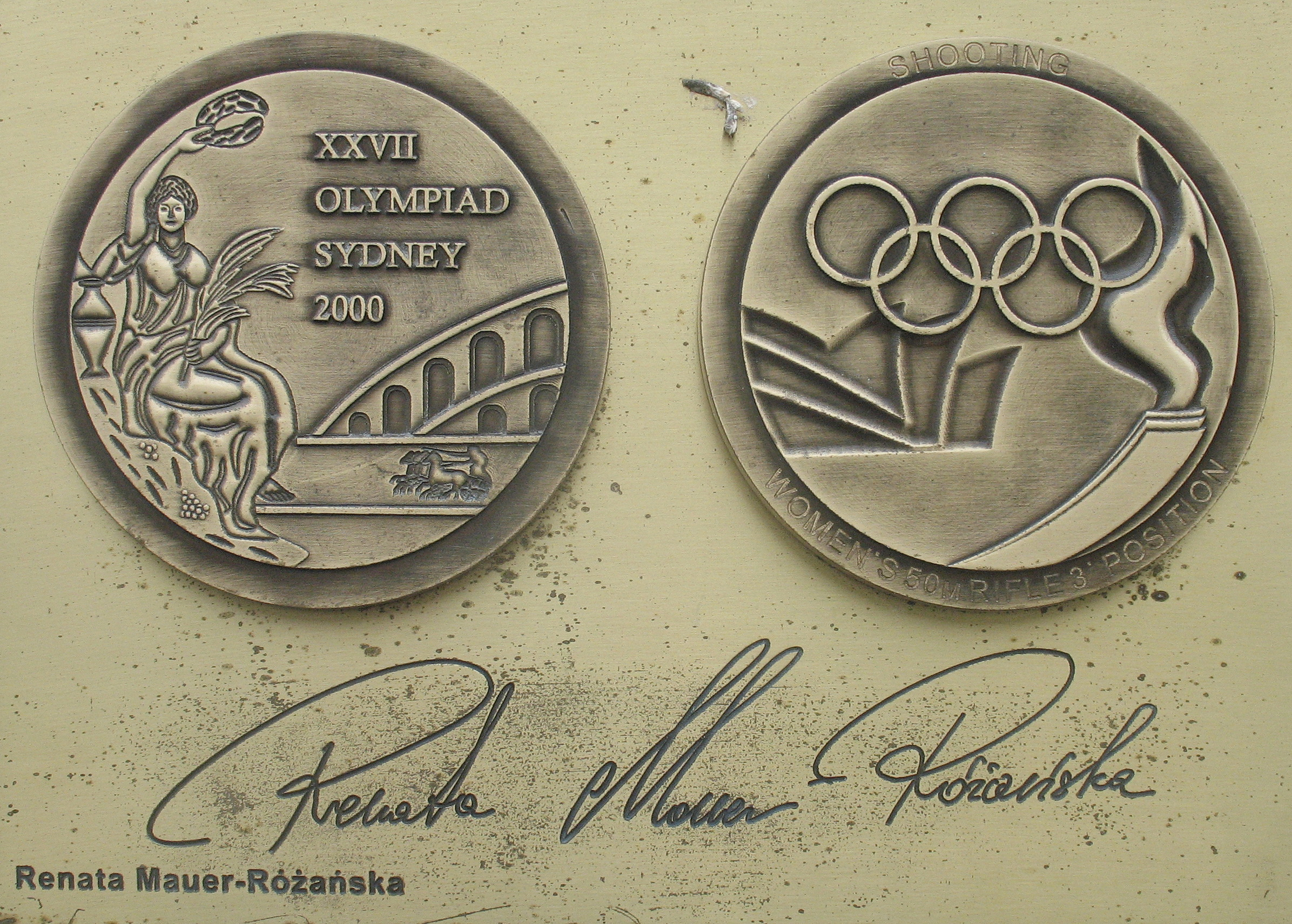
Copy of R. Mauer medal and autograph in Avenue Sports Star in Dziwnów

Renata Małgorzata Mauer-Różańska (born 23 April 1969 in Nasielsk) is a Polish sport shooter. She is a two-time Olympic champion, at the 1996 Summer Olympics in Atlanta and the 2000 Summer Olympics in Sydney, as well as having an Olympic bronze medal. In 1996, she was voted the Polish Sportspersonality of the Year.

For her sport achievements, she received the Order of Polonia Restituta:
Knight's Cross (5th Class) in 1996,
Officer's Cross (4th Class) in 2000.

Olympic results
Event	1992	1996	2000	2004
50 metre rifle three positions	14th 577	(bronze) Bronze; 589+90.8	(gold) Gold; 585+99.6	17th 573
10 metre air rifle	17th 389	(gold) Gold; 395+102.6	15th 392	9th 396
