= Cristina Antolín =

Spanish sports shooter

Personal information
- Nationality: Spanish
- Born: 15 September 1973 (age 51); Palencia, Spain

Sport
- Sport: Sports shooting

Cristina Antolín (born 15 September 1973) is a Spanish sports shooter. She competed in two events at the 1996 Summer Olympics.
