= Nancy Johnson (sport shooter) =

American sport shooter

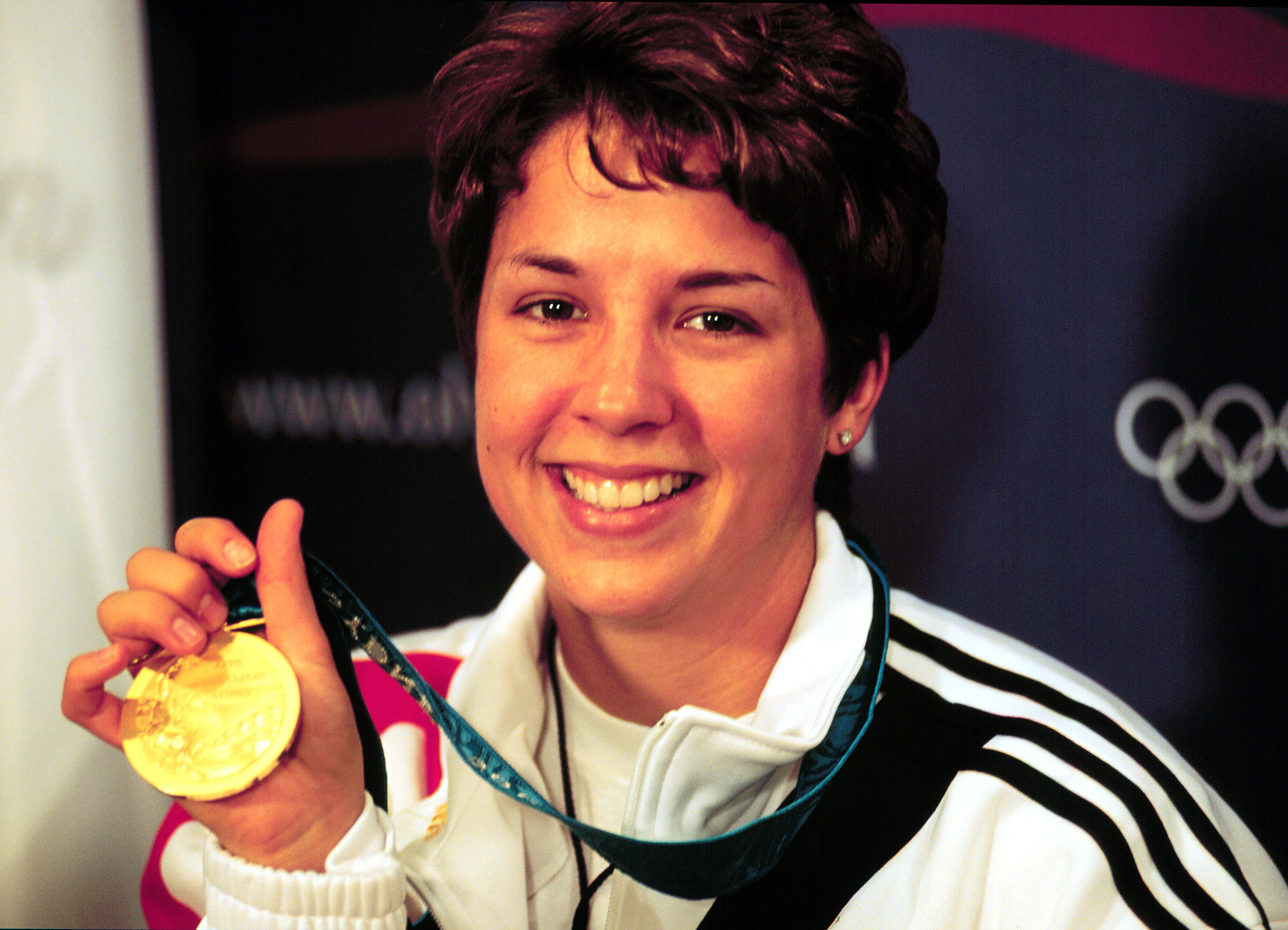
- Johnson with her Olympic gold medal

Personal information
- Nationality: American
- Born: January 14, 1974 (age 52) Downers Grove, Illinois
- Spouse: Ken Johnson

Sport
- Sport: Shooting
Medal record
Women's shooting
Representing the United States
Olympic Games
Gold medal – first place	2000 Sydney	10 m air rifle

Nancy Napolski-Johnson (born January 14, 1974) is a retired American sport shooter. She competed and won a gold medal in the 2000 Summer Olympics (10-meter air rifle for women) at 26. Nancy Johnson also competed in the 1996 Olympics but finished in 36th place.

== Early life ==
Nancy Johnson grew up in Downers Grove, Illinois, and was introduced to shooting at a young age. Her desire for shooting came from hunting deer with her father Ben Napolski. At age 15 she was initially interested in archery, but there were no establishments that supported it, so she joined the rifle club three blocks from her family's house (Downers Grove Junior Rifle Club). Her coach while at Downers Grove Rifle Club was Obie Elision. In high school, she shot competitively all four years against other private clubs and some high school clubs. At age 17 she had a mysterious ailment that made her lose feeling on the left side of her body, in which she needed intense physical therapy to regain her strength. After six months her condition disappeared on its own. Her mother Diane died before she could see her win the gold medal for the 2000 Summer Olympic games. She went to college at the University of Kentucky (class of 1996). Here she captured the individual national championship in air rifle in 1994 and was a three-time, first-team, All-American (1994, 1995 and 1996). She obtained a Bachelor in Science degree in horticulture. In 1997 on her way to the National Championships in California, she was involved in an auto accident that left her injured with a sprained wrist and unable to compete.

== Training ==
While training, she would be at the range practicing for 7.5 hours a day, six days a week. She would exercise by doing extensive cardio and rigorous weight training exercises. Her daily routine typically consisted of two hours of aerobic exercise, followed up by weightlifting. She would increase her stamina for a slower and more steady heartbeat for increased accuracy for her shots. Her training provided her the ability to have a heart rate of 45 to 50 beats per minute. When not using the ranges with the Army at Fort Benning, GA, Nancy would use a RIKA home trainer to simulate activities usually conducted on the range.

== Personal life ==
She married Kenneth Johnson in 1997 and they currently reside in Crawfordville, Florida. Ken was a staff sergeant in the United States Army and competed for the U.S. Army Marksmanship Unit. Nancy contributes most of her past success to the training she received from the Army coaches (Bill Krilling) and the ranges they offered. Ken also competed for the US men's air rifle team. Nancy is trying to organize a grassroots shooting program in the area where she lives in Crawfordville, Florida.
