= Kim Jung-mi (sport shooter) =

South Korean sports shooter (born 1975)

Kim Jung-mi (born 28 September 1975) is a South Korean sport shooter who competed in the 1996 Summer Olympics and in the 2004 Summer Olympics.
