= Kong Hyun-ah =

South Korean sports shooter (born 1972)

Medal record

Women's shooting

Representing South Korea

Asian Championships
Gold medal – first place	2012 Doha	50 m rifle prone team
Silver medal – second place	2012 Doha	50 m rifle 3 positions team

Kong Hyun-ah (born 3 May 1972) is a South Korean sport shooter who competed in the 1996 Summer Olympics.
