= Yoko Minamoto =

Japanese sport shooter

Yoko Minamoto (源洋子, Minamoto Yoko, born 18 July 1967) is a Japanese sport shooter who competed in the 1988 Summer Olympics, in the 1992 Summer Olympics, and in the 1996 Summer Olympics.
