= Gabriele Bühlmann =

Swiss sports shooter

Personal information
- Nationality: Swiss
- Born: 27 April 1964 (age 62)
- Height: 1.63 m (5 ft 4 in)
- Weight: 57 kg (126 lb)

Sport
- Country: Switzerland
- Sport: Shooting
- Events: 10 metre air rifle; 50 metre rifle three positions; 50 metre rifle prone
- Coached by: Heinz Reinkemeier
- Retired: 2004

Gabriele "Gaby" Bühlmann (born 27 April 1964, in Basel, Switzerland) is a Swiss rifle shooter who competed at five Olympic Games from 1988 to 2004.

== Shooting career ==
Bühlmann won 14 ISSF World Cup medals between 1987 and 2002, competing at four World Cup Finals. She competed at three ISSF World Championships, with a best finish of fourth in the Women's 50m Three Position Rifle at the 1994 Chamhionships.

She is, jointly with equestrian Markus Fuchs, the seventh Swiss sportsperson to compete at five Olympics, after middle-distance runner Paul Martin, equestrians Henri Chammartin and Gustav Fischer, javelin thrower Urs von Wartburg, equestrian Christine Stückelberger, and Alpine skier Paul Accola.

== Coaching career ==
She is the coach of 2008 Beijing Olympics gold medal-winning 10m air-rifle shooter Abhinav Bindra. She is co-author of Ways of the Rifle, a seminal coaching book on ISSF rifle disciplines.

== See also ==
- List of athletes with the most appearances at Olympic Games
