= Wang Xian (sport shooter) =

Chinese sport shooter

Wang Xian (born 13 May 1978) is a Chinese sport shooter who competed in the 2000 Summer Olympics.

Individual	591	Wang Xian (CHN)	May 29, 1998	Milan (ITA)
Teams	1754	China (Shan, Wang, Xu); China (Du, Shan, Wang)	24 July 1998; 6 October 2002	Barcelona (ESP); Busan (KOR)
