= Petra Horneber =

German sport shooter (born 1965)

Medal record

Women's shooting

Representing Germany

Olympic Games
Silver medal – second place	1996 Atlanta	10 m air rifle

Petra Horneber (born 21 April 1965) is a German sport shooter. She won the Silver medal in the 10 m air rifle in the 1996 Summer Olympics in Atlanta.
