= Shan Hong =

Chinese sport shooter (born 1967)

Shan Hong (born 10 February 1967) is a Chinese sport shooter who competed in the 2000 Summer Olympics.

Teams	1754	China (Shan, Wang, Xu); China (Du, Shan, Wang)	24 July 1998; 6 October 2002	Barcelona (ESP); Busan (KOR)
