= Shooting at the 2008 Summer Olympics – Men's 50 metre rifle three positions =

Men's 50 metre rifle three positions at the Games of the XXIX Olympiad
- Venue: Beijing Shooting Range Hall
- Date: August 17, 2008
- Competitors: 49 from 31 nations
- Winning score: 1272.5

Medalists
1st place, gold medalist(s)		Qiu Jian	China
2nd place, silver medalist(s)		Jury Sukhorukov	Ukraine
3rd place, bronze medalist(s)		Rajmond Debevec	Slovenia

The Men's 50 metre rifle three positions event at the 2008 Olympic Games took place on August 17 at the Beijing Shooting Range Hall, the last shooting event of the Beijing Olympics.

The event consisted of two rounds: a qualifier and a final. In the qualifier, each shooter fired 120 shots with a .22 Long Rifle at 50 metres distance. 40 shots were fired each from the standing, kneeling, and prone positions. Scores for each shot were in increments of 1, with a maximum score of 10.

The top 8 shooters in the qualifying round moved on to the final round. There, they fired an additional 10 shots, all from the standing position. These shots scored in increments of .1, with a maximum score of 10.9. The total score from all 130 shots was used to determine the final ranking.

== Records ==
The existing world and Olympic records were as follows.

Qualification records
World record	Rajmond Debevec (SLO)	1186	Munich, Germany	29 August 1992
Olympic record	Rajmond Debevec (SLO)	1177	Sydney, Australia	23 September 2000

Final records
World record	Rajmond Debevec (SLO)	1287.9 (1186+101.9)	Munich, Germany	29 August 1992
Olympic record	Rajmond Debevec (SLO)	1275.1 (1177+98.1)	Sydney, Australia	23 September 2000

== Qualification round ==
=== Prone position ===
Detailed prone results

Athlete	Country	1	2	3	4	Total	Notes
Matthew Emmons	United States	100	99	100	100	399	
Rajmond Debevec	Slovenia	100	100	100	99	399	
Toshikazu Yamashita	Japan	100	100	100	99	399	
Sergei Martynov	Belarus	99	99	100	100	398	
Stevan Pletikosić	Serbia	99	99	100	100	398	
Vebjørn Berg	Norway	100	98	100	100	398	
Nemanja Mirosavljev	Serbia	100	98	100	100	398	
Vitaliy Dovgun	Kazakhstan	99	100	99	100	398	
Jury Sukhorukov	Ukraine	99	100	99	100	398	
Park Bong-duk	South Korea	100	99	99	100	398	
Maik Eckhardt	Germany	100	99	100	99	398	
Juha Hirvi	Finland	98	100	100	99	397	
Marcel Bürge	Switzerland	99	98	100	99	396	
Espen Berg-Knutsen	Norway	98	99	100	99	396	
Marco De Nicolo	Italy	99	99	99	99	396	
Doron Egozi	Israel	99	99	99	99	396	
Michael Winter	Germany	99	99	99	99	396	
Valérian Sauveplane	France	99	99	100	98	396	
Mario Knögler	Austria	99	96	100	100	395	
Sanjeev Rajput	India	98	98	99	100	395	
Gil Simkovitch	Israel	98	99	98	100	395	
Beat Müller	Switzerland	99	98	98	100	395	
Yuriy Yurkov	Kazakhstan	100	98	97	100	395	
Robert Kraskowski	Poland	99	100	97	99	395	
Niccolò Campriani	Italy	99	99	100	97	395	
Jonathan Hammond	Great Britain	100	100	98	97	395	
Vitali Bubnovich	Belarus	97	99	98	100	394	
Liecer Perez	Cuba	97	99	99	99	394	
Qiu Jian	China	98	98	99	99	394	
Jozef Gönci	Slovakia	100	96	99	99	394	
Sergei Kovalenko	Russia	98	99	98	99	394	
Gagan Narang	India	98	99	98	99	394	
Jia Zhanbo	China	99	98	98	99	394	
Péter Sidi	Hungary	98	100	97	99	394	
Artur Ayvazyan	Ukraine	99	97	100	98	394	
Petar Gorša	Croatia	97	98	99	99	393	
Jason Parker	United States	99	97	98	99	393	
Nedžad Fazlija	Bosnia and Herzegovina	98	99	99	97	393	
Han Jin-seop	South Korea	100	96	97	99	392	
Benjamin Burge	Australia	100	96	99	97	392	
Artem Khadjibekov	Russia	97	98	97	99	391	
Václav Haman	Czech Republic	97	98	99	97	391	
Thomas Farnik	Austria	98	98	99	96	391	
Henri Häkkinen	Finland	97	98	96	99	390	
Siddique Umer	Pakistan	95	99	98	98	390	
Mohamed Amer	Egypt	98	99	97	96	390	
Matthew Robert Inabinet	Australia	96	97	98	98	389	
Josselin Henry	France	97	97	97	97	388	
Ruslan Ismailov	Kyrgyzstan	99	96	96	97	388	
Tomáš Jeřábek	Czech Republic						Did not start

=== Standing position ===
Detailed standing results

Athlete	Country	1	2	3	4	Total
Marco De Nicolo	Italy	97	96	97	99	389
Matthew Emmons	United States	97	99	96	97	389
Gagan Narang	India	98	99	96	96	389
Qiu Jian	China	95	94	99	99	387
Rajmond Debevec	Slovenia	95	96	97	98	386
Thomas Farnik	Austria	97	99	93	97	386
Mario Knögler	Austria	95	98	97	96	386
Michael Winter	Germany	97	95	96	97	385
Artur Ayvazyan	Ukraine	96	96	97	96	385
Péter Sidi	Hungary	96	96	97	96	385
Juha Hirvi	Finland	97	97	98	93	385
Jason Parker	United States	94	97	97	96	384
Jury Sukhorukov	Ukraine	98	96	94	96	384
Valérian Sauveplane	France	98	95	97	94	384
Han Jin-seop	South Korea	98	98	94	94	384
Vebjørn Berg	Norway	92	99	95	97	383
Artem Khadjibekov	Russia	97	92	98	96	383
Sergei Kovalenko	Russia	93	96	95	98	382
Toshikazu Yamashita	Japan	95	95	97	95	382
Yuriy Yurkov	Kazakhstan	98	95	94	95	382
Nemanja Mirosavljev	Serbia	93	96	94	98	381
Henri Häkkinen	Finland	95	95	94	97	381
Vitaliy Dovgun	Kazakhstan	94	97	98	92	381
Václav Haman	Czech Republic	93	95	96	96	380
Beat Müller	Switzerland	94	95	96	95	380
Maik Eckhardt	Germany	99	90	96	95	380
Sanjeev Rajput	India	95	96	98	91	380
Vitali Bubnovich	Belarus	97	96	96	91	380
Stevan Pletikosić	Serbia	91	94	97	96	378
Jia Zhanbo	China	96	96	93	93	378
Niccolò Campriani	Italy	95	92	95	95	377
Petar Gorša	Croatia	96	93	97	91	377
Sergei Martynov	Belarus	94	92	95	95	376
Jozef Gönci	Slovakia	96	93	93	94	376
Nedžad Fazlija	Bosnia and Herzegovina	94	95	94	93	376
Matthew Robert Inabinet	Australia	97	95	92	92	376
Doron Egozi	Israel	93	94	96	92	375
Espen Berg-Knutsen	Norway	95	92	94	93	374
Marcel Bürge	Switzerland	92	96	90	95	373
Robert Kraskowski	Poland	92	95	92	94	373
Park Bong-duk	South Korea	94	94	91	94	373
Liecer Perez	Cuba	92	96	93	92	373
Josselin Henry	France	94	94	93	92	373
Benjamin Burge	Australia	96	92	93	92	373
Jonathan Hammond	Great Britain	94	92	92	92	370
Mohamed Amer	Egypt	95	91	89	94	369
Gil Simkovitch	Israel	91	91	92	94	368
Ruslan Ismailov	Kyrgyzstan	92	89	92	94	367
Siddique Umer	Pakistan	91	85	95	88	359

=== Kneeling position ===
Detailed kneeling results

Athlete	Country	1	2	3	4	Total
Thomas Farnik	Austria	100	98	99	97	394
Artem Khadjibekov	Russia	99	97	98	99	393
Václav Haman	Czech Republic	99	96	98	99	392
Jury Sukhorukov	Ukraine	99	97	98	98	392
Stevan Pletikosić	Serbia	98	98	99	97	392
Valérian Sauveplane	France	99	98	98	97	392
Qiu Jian	China	99	98	99	96	392
Jia Zhanbo	China	98	96	98	99	391
Vebjørn Berg	Norway	96	98	99	98	391
Han Jin-seop	South Korea	98	96	99	98	391
Rajmond Debevec	Slovenia	97	98	99	97	391
Maik Eckhardt	Germany	97	99	99	96	391
Gil Simkovitch	Israel	98	96	98	98	390
Henri Häkkinen	Finland	96	99	97	98	390
Josselin Henry	France	98	97	99	96	390
Sergei Kovalenko	Russia	99	97	98	96	390
Espen Berg-Knutsen	Norway	99	99	96	96	390
Beat Müller	Switzerland	96	97	98	98	389
Mario Knögler	Austria	98	99	96	96	389
Robert Kraskowski	Poland	98	96	95	99	388
Park Bong-duk	South Korea	96	97	98	97	388
Benjamin Burge	Australia	95	98	96	98	387
Vitali Bubnovich	Belarus	97	98	95	97	387
Sanjeev Rajput	India	99	94	98	96	387
Matthew Emmons	United States	99	95	98	95	387
Jason Parker	United States	98	97	98	94	387
Artur Ayvazyan	Ukraine	97	95	95	99	386
Marcel Bürge	Switzerland	97	96	96	97	386
Nemanja Mirosavljev	Serbia	96	98	95	97	386
Toshikazu Yamashita	Japan	98	96	97	95	386
Juha Hirvi	Finland	97	99	97	93	386
Michael Winter	Germany	96	98	92	99	385
Yuriy Yurkov	Kazakhstan	95	97	97	96	385
Gagan Narang	India	94	93	97	100	384
Jozef Gönci	Slovakia	96	94	96	98	384
Marco De Nicolo	Italy	98	92	97	97	384
Doron Egozi	Israel	94	97	97	96	384
Péter Sidi	Hungary	98	94	97	95	384
Jonathan Hammond	Great Britain	95	96	96	96	383
Sergei Martynov	Belarus	98	93	97	94	382
Niccolò Campriani	Italy	97	98	92	94	381
Vitaliy Dovgun	Kazakhstan	94	95	93	97	379
Nedžad Fazlija	Bosnia and Herzegovina	96	95	93	95	379
Petar Gorša	Croatia	93	95	97	93	378
Mohamed Amer	Egypt	94	98	90	94	376
Matthew Robert Inabinet	Australia	92	97	95	92	376
Ruslan Ismailov	Kyrgyzstan	96	95	94	90	375
Liecer Perez	Cuba	91	92	91	93	367
Siddique Umer	Pakistan	95	92	88	92	367

=== Combined results ===
Rank	Athlete	Country	Prone	Stand	Kneel	Total	Notes
1	Rajmond Debevec	Slovenia	399	386	391	1176	Q
2	Matthew Emmons	United States	399	389	387	1175	Q
3	Jury Sukhorukov	Ukraine	398	384	392	1174	Q
4	Qiu Jian	China	394	387	392	1173	Q
5	Vebjørn Berg	Norway	398	383	391	1172	Q
6	Valérian Sauveplane	France	396	384	392	1172	Q
7	Thomas Farnik	Austria	391	386	394	1171	Q
8	Mario Knögler	Austria	395	386	389	1170	Q
9	Marco De Nicolo	Italy	396	389	384	1169	
10	Maik Eckhardt	Germany	398	380	391	1169	
11	Stevan Pletikosić	Serbia	398	378	392	1168	
12	Juha Hirvi	Finland	397	385	386	1168	
13	Gagan Narang	India	394	389	384	1167	
14	Artem Khadjibekov	Russia	391	383	393	1167	
15	Han Jin-seop	South Korea	392	384	391	1167	
16	Toshikazu Yamashita	Japan	399	382	386	1167	
17	Michael Winter	Germany	396	385	385	1166	
18	Sergei Kovalenko	Russia	394	382	390	1166	
19	Artur Ayvazyan	Ukraine	394	385	386	1165	
20	Nemanja Mirosavljev	Serbia	398	381	386	1165	
21	Beat Müller	Switzerland	395	380	389	1164	
22	Jason Parker	United States	393	384	387	1164	
23	Václav Haman	Czech Republic	391	380	392	1163	
24	Jia Zhanbo	China	394	378	391	1163	
25	Péter Sidi	Hungary	394	385	384	1163	
26	Sanjeev Rajput	India	395	380	387	1162	
27	Yuriy Yurkov	Kazakhstan	395	382	385	1162	
28	Henri Häkkinen	Finland	390	381	390	1161	
29	Vitali Bubnovich	Belarus	394	380	387	1161	
30	Espen Berg-Knutsen	Norway	396	374	390	1160	
31	Park Bong-duk	South Korea	398	373	388	1159	
32	Vitaliy Dovgun	Kazakhstan	398	381	379	1158	
33	Robert Kraskowski	Poland	395	373	388	1156	
34	Sergei Martynov	Belarus	398	376	382	1156	
35	Marcel Bürge	Switzerland	396	373	386	1155	
36	Doron Egozi	Israel	396	375	384	1155	
37	Jozef Gönci	Slovakia	394	376	384	1154	
38	Gil Simkovitch	Israel	395	368	390	1153	
39	Niccolò Campriani	Italy	395	377	381	1153	
40	Benjamin Burge	Australia	392	373	387	1152	
41	Josselin Henry	France	388	373	390	1151	
42	Jonathan Hammond	Great Britain	395	370	383	1148	
43	Nedžad Fazlija	Bosnia and Herzegovina	393	376	379	1148	
44	Petar Gorša	Croatia	393	377	378	1148	
45	Matthew Robert Inabinet	Australia	389	376	376	1141	
46	Mohamed Amer	Egypt	390	369	376	1135	
47	Liecer Perez	Cuba	394	373	367	1134	
48	Ruslan Ismailov	Kyrgyzstan	388	367	375	1130	
49	Siddique Umer	Pakistan	390	359	367	1116	
	Tomáš Jeřábek	Czech Republic					DNS

DNS Did not start – Q Qualified for final

== Final ==
Rank	Athlete	Qual	1	2	3	4	5	6	7	8	9	10	Final	Total
1st place, gold medalist(s)	Qiu Jian (CHN)	1173	10.2	8.8	10.5	10.6	9.3	9.4	10.0	10.3	10.4	10.0	99.5	1272.5
2nd place, silver medalist(s)	Jury Sukhorukov (UKR)	1174	9.5	9.5	9.8	9.9	10.1	9.1	10.2	10.1	10.4	9.8	98.4	1272.4
3rd place, bronze medalist(s)	Rajmond Debevec (SLO)	1176	7.7	10.2	7.9	9.5	10.0	10.5	9.2	10.0	9.9	10.8	95.7	1271.7
4	Matthew Emmons (USA)	1175	9.7	10.2	10.5	10.1	10.5	10.0	10.1	10.0	9.8	4.4	95.3	1270.3
5	Thomas Farnik (AUT)	1171	10.0	9.4	9.7	9.4	9.8	9.9	9.9	10.1	9.4	10.3	97.9	1268.9
6	Mario Knögler (AUT)	1170	8.2	10.1	9.4	10.2	10.2	10.3	10.4	10.2	10.1	9.3	98.4	1268.4
7	Valérian Sauveplane (FRA)	1172	8.8	9.2	10.3	10.1	10.0	10.1	7.9	9.5	9.2	10.0	95.1	1267.1
8	Vebjørn Berg (NOR)	1172	9.4	8.8	8.6	10.6	8.0	10.2	9.5	9.6	10.0	9.8	94.5	1266.5
