= Shooting at the 2008 Summer Olympics – Men's 50 metre rifle prone =

Men's 50 metre rifle prone at the Games of the XXIX Olympiad
- Venue: Beijing Shooting Range Hall
- Date: August 15, 2008
- Competitors: 56 from 36 nations
- Winning score: 702.7

Medalists
1st place, gold medalist(s)		Artur Ayvazyan	Ukraine
2nd place, silver medalist(s)		Matthew Emmons	United States
3rd place, bronze medalist(s)		Warren Potent	Australia

The Men's 50 metre rifle prone event at the 2008 Olympic Games took place on August 15 at the Beijing Shooting Range Hall.

The event consisted of two rounds: a qualifier and a final. In the qualifier, each shooter fired 60 shots with a .22 Long Rifle at 50 metres distance from the prone position. Scores for each shot were in increments of 1, with a maximum score of 10.

The top 8 shooters in the qualifying round moved on to the final round. There, they fired an additional 10 shots. These shots scored in increments of .1, with a maximum score of 10.9. The total score from all 70 shots was used to determine final ranking.

== Records ==
The existing world and Olympic records were as follows.

Qualification records
World record	Viatcheslav Botchkarev (URS); Stevan Pletikosić (YUG); Jean-Pierre Amat (FRA); Christian Klees (GER); Sergei Martynov (BLR); Thomas Tamas (USA); Sergei Martynov (BLR); Sergei Martynov (BLR); Petr Litvinchuk (BLR); Wolfram Waibel Jr. (AUT); Wolfram Waibel Jr. (AUT); Christian Lusch (GER); Eric Uptagrafft (USA); Valérian Sauveplane (FRA); Sergei Martynov (BLR); Sergei Martynov (BLR); Matthew Emmons (USA); Guy Starik (ISR)	600	Zagreb, Croatia; Munich, Germany; Havana, Cuba; Atlanta, United States; Munich, Germany; Barcelona, Spain; Buenos Aires, Argentina; Munich, Germany; Munich, Germany; Plzeň, Czech Republic; Sydney, Australia; Bangkok, Thailand; Fort Benning, United States; Fort Benning, United States; Munich, Germany; Guangzhou, China; Bangkok, Thailand; Munich, Germany	13 July 1989; 29 August 1991; 27 April 1994; 25 July 1996; 23 May 1997; 29 August 1998; 4 September 1998; 8 June 2000; 11 June 2003; 18 July 2003; 3 March 2004; 27 October 2004; 11 May 2005; 11 May 2005; 26 August 2005; 29 March 2006; 9 May 2007; 18 May 2008
Olympic record	Christian Klees (GER)	600	Atlanta, United States	25 July 1996

Final records
World record	Christian Klees (GER); Warren Potent (AUS)	704.8 (600+104.8); 704.8 (599+105.8)	Atlanta, United States; Beijing, China	25 July 1996; 18 April 2008
Olympic record	Christian Klees (GER)	704.8 (600+104.8)	Atlanta, United States	25 July 1996

== Qualification round ==
Rank	Athlete	Country	1	2	3	4	5	6	Total	Notes
1	Artur Ayvazyan	Ukraine	100	100	100	100	100	99	599	Q
2	Matthew Emmons	United States	99	100	98	100	100	100	597	Q
3	Vebjørn Berg	Norway	99	99	100	99	99	100	596	Q
4	Warren Potent	Australia	99	99	99	99	99	100	595	Q
5	Juha Hirvi	Finland	100	100	100	97	99	99	595	Q
6	Sergei Martynov	Belarus	100	99	98	100	100	98	595	Q
7	Konstantin Prikhodtchenko	Russia	99	100	100	99	99	98	595	Q
8	Valérian Sauveplane	France	98	100	97	100	100	99	594	Q
9	Michael Anti	United States	99	98	99	99	100	99	594	
10	Stevan Pletikosić	Serbia	99	99	99	98	100	99	594	
11	Espen Berg-Knutsen	Norway	100	98	99	100	98	99	594	
12	Guy Starik	Israel	98	99	100	99	100	98	594	
13	Artem Khadjibekov	Russia	100	99	99	99	99	98	594	
14	Robert Eastham	New Zealand	99	100	100	99	98	98	594	
15	Marco De Nicolo	Italy	99	98	98	100	99	99	593	
16	Jozef Gönci	Slovakia	99	99	98	100	98	99	593	
17	Petr Litvinchuk	Belarus	97	100	100	99	98	99	593	
18	Toshikazu Yamashita	Japan	99	99	99	99	99	98	593	
19	Qiu Jian	China	99	100	98	99	99	98	593	
20	Vitaliy Dovgun	Kazakhstan	96	99	99	100	100	98	592	
21	Rajmond Debevec	Slovenia	99	99	97	100	99	98	592	
22	Gil Simkovitch	Israel	100	97	99	100	98	98	592	
23	Josselin Henry	France	99	100	99	98	99	97	592	
24	Maik Eckhardt	Germany	99	100	99	100	97	97	592	
25	Robert Kraskowski	Poland	98	98	100	97	99	99	591	
26	Sanjeev Rajput	India	97	100	99	98	99	98	591	
27	Jia Zhanbo	China	100	99	97	99	98	98	591	
28	Kim Hak-man	South Korea	99	100	98	99	99	96	591	
29	Miroslav Varga	Czech Republic	98	96	100	98	98	100	590	
30	Mario Knögler	Austria	98	98	97	99	99	99	590	
31	Michael Winter	Germany	98	98	98	98	99	99	590	
32	Marcel Bürge	Switzerland	98	98	97	100	99	98	590	
33	Nemanja Mirosavljev	Serbia	100	99	99	97	99	96	590	
34	Jonathan Hammond	Great Britain	99	97	96	98	99	100	589	
35	Gagan Narang	India	98	98	99	96	99	99	589	
36	Jury Sukhorukov	Ukraine	98	99	98	99	97	98	589	
37	Salman Zaman	Bahrain	98	97	95	100	99	99	588	
38	Niccolò Campriani	Italy	98	97	97	99	98	99	588	
39	Péter Sidi	Hungary	99	99	97	96	98	99	588	
40	Benjamin Burge	Australia	99	100	96	98	96	99	588	
41	Christian Planer	Austria	98	98	98	99	98	97	588	
42	Yuriy Yurkov	Kazakhstan	99	97	98	99	98	97	588	
43	Park Bong-duk	South Korea	99	98	97	96	99	98	587	
44	Johannes Sauer	Canada	96	99	97	99	98	98	587	
45	Nedžad Fazlija	Bosnia and Herzegovina	96	96	100	98	98	98	586	
46	Tomáš Jeřábek	Czech Republic	98	98	96	98	99	97	586	
47	Henri Häkkinen	Finland	99	95	98	99	98	97	586	
48	Simon Beyeler	Switzerland	100	97	94	99	97	98	585	
49	Petar Gorša	Croatia	98	99	97	97	99	93	583	
50	Luis Martínez	Spain	98	97	94	99	97	97	582	
51	Dadallah Al-Bulushi	Oman	96	97	98	95	100	96	582	
52	Liecer Perez	Cuba	96	96	97	99	99	95	582	
53	Ned Gerard	Virgin Islands	96	96	95	98	97	98	580	
54	Ruslan Ismailov	Kyrgyzstan	94	96	97	96	96	99	578	
55	Walter Martínez	Nicaragua	96	96	92	96	99	97	576	
56	Hazem Mohamed	Egypt	97	97	96	95	95	96	576	

Q Qualified for final

== Final ==
Rank	Athlete	Qual	1	2	3	4	5	6	7	8	9	10	Final	Total
1	Artur Ayvazyan (UKR)	599	10.4	10.6	10.2	10.6	10.2	10.4	10.8	10.0	10.2	10.3	103.7	702.7
2	Matthew Emmons (USA)	597	10.0	10.8	10.6	9.8	10.8	10.8	10.7	10.4	10.4	10.4	104.7	701.7
3	Warren Potent (AUS)	595	10.3	10.6	10.6	10.3	10.4	10.7	10.5	10.8	10.6	10.7	105.5	700.5
4	Vebjørn Berg (NOR)	596	10.1	10.4	10.2	10.1	10.1	9.9	10.8	10.7	10.6	10.2	103.1	699.1
5	Konstantin Prikhodtchenko (RUS)	595	10.8	10.6	10.9	10.3	9.9	10.1	9.9	10.3	10.6	10.6	104.0	699.0
6	Valérian Sauveplane (FRA)	594	10.8	10.5	9.4	10.5	10.4	10.7	10.8	10.4	10.8	10.5	104.8	698.8
7	Juha Hirvi (FIN)	595	10.2	10.5	9.3	10.5	10.7	10.0	10.7	10.8	10.6	10.2	103.5	698.5
8	Sergei Martynov (BLR)	595	9.8	10.6	10.3	9.9	10.1	10.7	10.8	10.6	10.0	10.5	103.3	698.3
