= Shooting at the 2008 Summer Olympics – Men's 10 metre air rifle =

Men's 10 metre air rifle at the Games of the XXIX Olympiad
- Venue: Beijing Shooting Range Hall
- Date: August 11, 2008
- Competitors: 51 from 37 nations
- Winning score: 700.5

Medalists
1st place, gold medalist(s)		Abhinav Bindra	India
2nd place, silver medalist(s)		Zhu Qinan	China
3rd place, bronze medalist(s)		Henri Häkkinen	Finland

The Men's 10 metre air rifle event at the 2008 Olympic Games took place on August 11 at the Beijing Shooting Range Hall.

The event consisted of two rounds: a qualifier and a final. In the qualifier, each shooter fired 60 shots with an air rifle at 10 metres distance from the standing position. Scores for each shot were in increments of 1, with a maximum score of 10.

The top 8 shooters in the qualifying round moved on to the final round. There, they fired an additional 10 shots. These shots scored in increments of 0.1, with a maximum score of 10.9. The total score from all 70 shots was used to determine final ranking.

Abhinav Bindra became the first ever individual Olympic gold medalist from India. Zhu Qinan of China won the silver medal, while Henri Häkkinen of Finland won the bronze medal.

== Records ==
The existing world and Olympic records were as follows.

Qualification records
World record	Tevarit Majchacheep (THA); Denis Sokolov (RUS)	600	Langkawi, Malaysia; Winterthur, Switzerland	27 January 2000; 1 March 2008
Olympic record	Zhu Qinan (CHN)	599	Athens, Greece	16 August 2004

Final records
World record	Thomas Farnik (AUT)	703.1 (599+104.1)	Granada, Spain	4 October 2006
Olympic record	Zhu Qinan (CHN)	702.7 (599+103.7)	Athens, Greece	16 August 2004

== Qualification round ==
Rank	Athlete	Country	1	2	3	4	5	6	Total	Notes
1	Henri Häkkinen	Finland	100	100	99	100	100	99	598	Q
2	Zhu Qinan	China	100	100	100	100	99	98	597	Q
3	Alin George Moldoveanu	Romania	99	99	99	100	100	99	596	Q
4	Abhinav Bindra	India	100	99	100	98	100	99	596	Q
5	Sergei Kruglov	Russia	100	99	98	98	100	100	595	Q
6	Péter Sidi	Hungary	98	99	100	99	99	100	595	Q
7	Konstantin Prikhodtchenko	Russia	99	99	100	98	99	100	595	Q
8	Stevan Pletikosić	Serbia	100	98	100	98	99	100	595	Q
9	Gagan Narang	India	97	100	100	100	98	100	595	
10	Thomas Farnik	Austria	99	99	99	98	100	99	594	
11	Oleksandr Lazeykin	Ukraine	99	100	98	100	99	98	594	
12	Niccolò Campriani	Italy	99	100	100	98	99	98	594	
13	Václav Haman	Czech Republic	99	98	98	99	100	99	593	
14	Cao Yifei	China	98	99	99	99	99	99	593	
15	Tino Mohaupt	Germany	98	99	99	99	99	99	593	
16	Park Bong-duk	South Korea	98	100	98	99	99	99	593	
17	Nemanja Mirosavljev	Serbia	99	98	98	100	100	98	593	
18	Vitali Bubnovich	Belarus	97	99	99	99	99	99	592	
19	Are Hansen	Norway	98	99	98	99	99	99	592	
20	Marco De Nicolo	Italy	97	99	100	100	98	98	592	
21	Artur Ayvazyan	Ukraine	98	99	99	100	98	98	592	
22	Vebjørn Berg	Norway	99	99	100	100	96	98	592	
23	Jason Parker	United States	97	99	98	99	98	100	591	
24	José Luis Sánchez	Mexico	99	99	97	99	98	99	591	
25	Roberto José Elias	Mexico	98	98	98	100	96	100	590	
26	Han Jin-seop	South Korea	100	95	98	98	100	99	590	
27	Stephen Scherer	United States	98	99	97	97	100	99	590	
28	Toshikazu Yamashita	Japan	98	99	99	98	98	98	590	
29	Jonathan Hammond	Great Britain	95	98	100	98	99	99	589	
30	Christian Planer	Austria	97	98	97	99	100	98	589	
31	Rajmond Debevec	Slovenia	96	97	100	99	99	98	589	
32	Luis Martínez	Spain	100	99	99	96	97	98	589	
33	Robert Kraskowski	Poland	99	99	97	99	98	97	589	
34	Oliver Geissmann	Liechtenstein	99	95	98	99	97	100	588	
35	Nedžad Fazlija	Bosnia and Herzegovina	98	99	98	98	96	99	588	
36	Michael Winter	Germany	97	99	95	100	99	98	588	
37	Petar Gorša	Croatia	98	99	97	97	99	98	588	
38	Vitaliy Dovgun	Kazakhstan	97	96	99	98	98	99	587	
39	Ruslan Ismailov	Kyrgyzstan	97	99	98	97	97	99	587	
40	Josselin Henry	France	97	97	97	99	99	98	587	
41	Doron Egozi	Israel	98	100	98	98	95	98	587	
42	Yuriy Yurkov	Kazakhstan	96	98	99	96	98	99	586	
43	Mohamed Abdellah	Egypt	97	100	97	96	100	96	586	
44	Liecer Perez	Cuba	95	97	98	99	97	99	585	
45	Simon Beyeler	Switzerland	95	98	96	99	97	98	583	
46	Mohammad Imam Hossain	Bangladesh	95	98	96	97	95	100	581	
47	Matthew Robert Inabinet	Australia	97	94	98	96	98	96	579	
48	Siddique Umer	Pakistan	95	96	95	97	98	97	578	
49	Benjamin Burge	Australia	98	93	97	95	98	95	576	
50	Walter Martínez	Nicaragua	95	95	98	94	94	93	569	
51	Saso Nestorov	Macedonia	96	91	93	92	92	94	558	

Q Qualified for final

== Final ==
Rank	Athlete	Qual	1	2	3	4	5	6	7	8	9	10	Final	Total	Shoot-off
1	Abhinav Bindra (IND)	596	10.7	10.3	10.4	10.5	10.5	10.5	10.6	10.0	10.2	10.8	104.5	700.5	
2	Zhu Qinan (CHN)	597	10.2	10.0	9.9	10.2	10.1	10.7	10.1	10.6	10.4	10.5	102.7	699.7	
3	Henri Häkkinen (FIN)	598	10.1	10.2	10.5	10.0	10.2	10.3	10.0	10.1	10.3	9.7	101.4	699.4	
4	Alin George Moldoveanu (ROU)	596	10.2	9.8	10.2	10.1	10.4	10.4	10.7	10.4	10.3	10.6	102.9	698.9	
5	Konstantin Prikhodtchenko (RUS)	595	10.1	9.4	10.5	10.3	10.6	10.6	10.3	10.4	10.5	10.7	103.4	698.4	10.0
6	Péter Sidi (HUN)	595	10.3	10.8	9.6	10.8	10.0	10.2	10.7	10.8	10.2	10.0	103.4	698.4	9.1
7	Stevan Pletikosić (SRB)	595	10.3	10.4	10.6	9.7	10.8	10.6	9.6	10.0	9.9	10.8	102.7	697.7	
8	Sergei Kruglov (RUS)	595	9.2	10.4	10.0	10.7	9.7	10.6	10.5	10.5	10.2	10.2	102.0	697.0	
