= Austria at the 2008 Summer Olympics =

- IOC code: AUT
- NOC: Austrian Olympic Committee
- Website: www.olympia.at (in German)

in Beijing
- Competitors: 70 in 14 sports
- Flag bearers: Hans-Peter Steinacher (opening); Ludwig Paischer (closing)
- Medals Ranked 61st: Gold 0 Silver 1 Bronze 2 Total 3

Summer Olympics appearances (overview)
- 1896; 1900; 1904; 1908; 1912; 1920; 1924; 1928; 1932; 1936; 1948; 1952; 1956; 1960; 1964; 1968; 1972; 1976; 1980; 1984; 1988; 1992; 1996; 2000; 2004; 2008; 2012; 2016; 2020; 2024

Other related appearances
- 1906 Intercalated Games

Austria sent a team to compete at the 2008 Summer Olympics in Beijing, China.

== Medalists ==
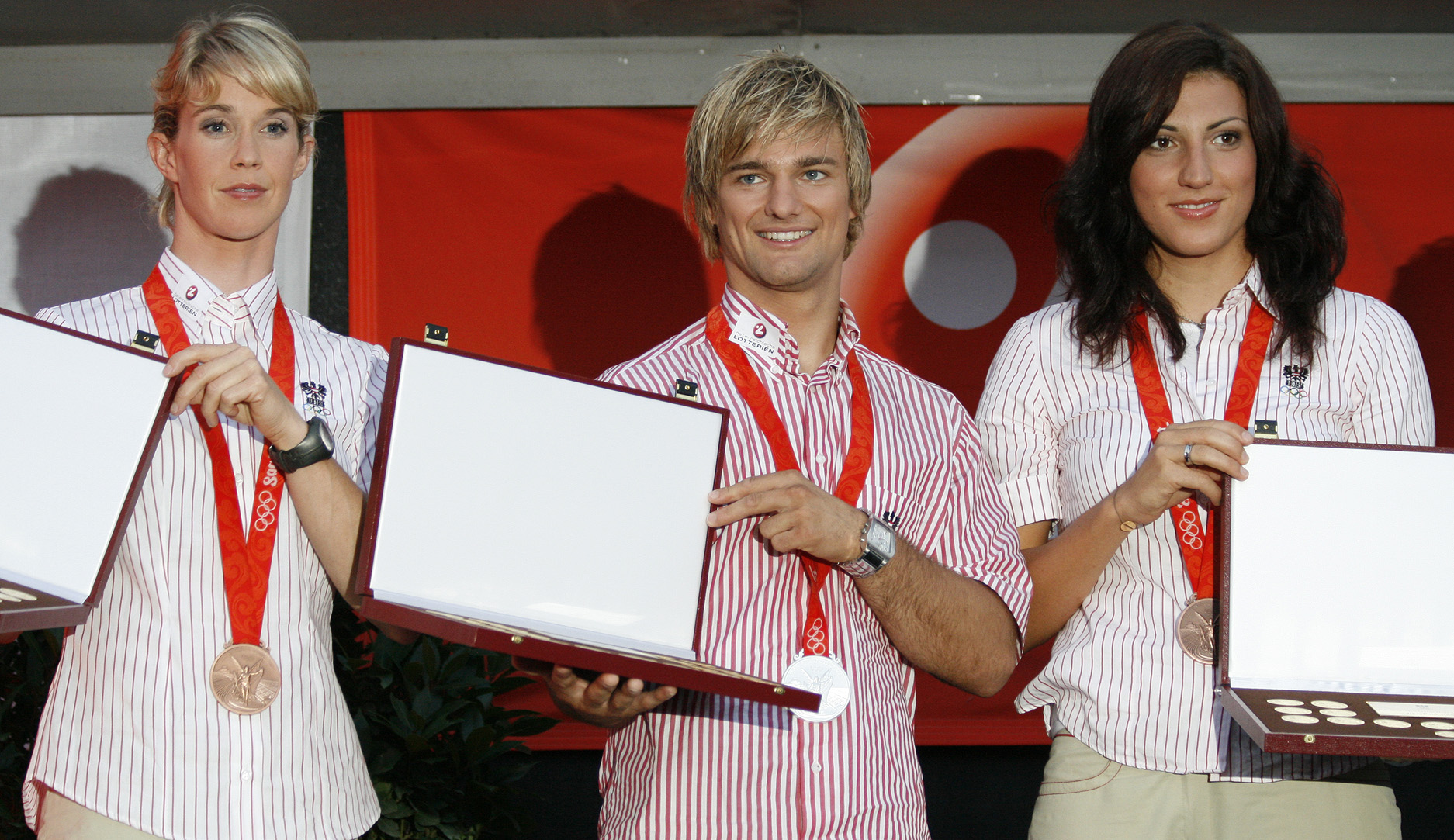
Violetta Oblinger-Peters (left), Ludwig Paischer (center) and Mirna Jukić (right)

Medal	Name	Sport	Event
Silver	Ludwig Paischer	Judo	Men's 60 kg
Bronze	Mirna Jukić	Swimming	Women's 100 m breaststroke
Bronze	Violetta Oblinger-Peters	Canoeing	Women's K-1

== Athletics ==
Key

- Note–Ranks given for track events are within the athlete's heat only
- Q = Qualified for the next round
- q = Qualified for the next round as a fastest loser or, in field events, by position without achieving the qualifying target
- NR = National record
- N/A = Round not applicable for the event
- Bye = Athlete not required to compete in round

Men
Track & road events

Athlete	Event	Final	
Athlete	Event	Result	Rank
Günther Weidlinger	10000 m	28:14.38	27

Field events

Athlete	Event	Qualification		Final	
Athlete	Event	Distance	Position	Distance	Position
Gerhard Mayer	Discus throw	61.32	18	Did not advance	

Women
Track & road events

Athlete	Event	Final	
Athlete	Event	Result	Rank
Eva-Maria Gradwohl	Marathon	2:44:24	57

== Canoeing ==
=== Slalom ===
Athlete	Event	Preliminary						Semifinal		Final			
Athlete	Event	Run 1	Rank	Run 2	Rank	Total	Rank	Time	Rank	Time	Rank	Total	Rank
Helmut Oblinger	Men's K-1	86.21	10	85.54	7	171.75	6 Q	88.69	9 Q	90.14	6	178.83	7
Violetta Oblinger-Peters	Women's K-1	97.27	6	99.44	7	196.71	6 Q	110.65	5 Q	104.12	3	214.77	3rd place, bronze medalist(s)

=== Sprint ===
Athlete	Event	Heats		Semifinals		Final	
Athlete	Event	Time	Rank	Time	Rank	Time	Rank
Yvonne Schuring; Viktoria Schwarz	Women's K-2 500 m	1:46.980	5 QS	1:44.834	3 Q	1:44.965	9

Qualification Legend: QS = Qualify to semi-final; QF = Qualify directly to final

== Cycling ==
=== Road ===
Athlete	Event	Time	Rank
Christian Pfannberger	Men's road race	6:26:17	23
Thomas Rohregger	Men's road race	6:26:25	39
Monika Schachl	Women's road race	3:36:37	46
Christiane Soeder	Women's road race	3:32:28	4
Christiane Soeder	Women's time trial	36:20.75	7

=== Mountain biking ===
Athlete	Event	Time	Rank
Christoph Soukup	Men's cross-country	2:00:11	6
Elisabeth Osl	Women's cross-country	1:51:39	11

== Diving ==
Men

Athlete	Event	Preliminaries		Semifinals		Final	
Athlete	Event	Points	Rank	Points	Rank	Points	Rank
Constantin Blaha	3 m springboard	407.55	22	Did not advance			

Women

Athlete	Event	Preliminaries		Semifinals		Final	
Athlete	Event	Points	Rank	Points	Rank	Points	Rank
Veronika Kratochwil	3 m springboard	218.75	27	Did not advance			
Anja Richter	10 m platform	287.70	22	Did not advance			

== Equestrian ==
=== Dressage ===
Athlete	Horse	Event	Grand Prix		Grand Prix Special		Grand Prix Freestyle		Overall	
Athlete	Horse	Event	Score	Rank	Score	Rank	Score	Rank	Score	Rank
Victoria Max-Theurer	Falcao Old	Individual	65.333	27	Did not advance					

=== Eventing ===
Athlete	Horse	Event	Dressage		Cross-country			Jumping						Total	
Athlete	Horse	Event	Dressage		Cross-country			Qualifier			Final			Total	
Athlete	Horse	Event	Penalties	Rank	Penalties	Total	Rank	Penalties	Total	Rank	Penalties	Total	Rank	Penalties	Rank
Harald Ambros	Quick 2	Individual	55.70	51	Withdrew*										

*Harald Ambros withdrew after the dressage competition because his horse suffered from an injury.

== Fencing ==
Men

Athlete	Event	Round of 64	Round of 32	Round of 16	Quarterfinal	Semifinal	Final / BM	
Athlete	Event	Opposition Score	Opposition Score	Opposition Score	Opposition Score	Opposition Score	Opposition Score	Rank
Roland Schlosser	Individual foil	Bye	Menendez (ESP); W 15–9	Cassarà (ITA); L 8–15	Did not advance			

== Gymnastics ==
=== Rhythmic ===
Athlete	Event	Qualification						Final					
Athlete	Event	Rope	Hoop	Clubs	Ribbon	Total	Rank	Rope	Hoop	Clubs	Ribbon	Total	Rank
Caroline Weber	Individual	16.125	15.875	16.250	15.925	64.175	17	Did not advance					

== Judo ==
Men

Athlete	Event	Preliminary	Round of 32	Round of 16	Quarterfinals	Semifinals	Repechage 1	Repechage 2	Repechage 3	Final / BM	
Athlete	Event	Opposition Result	Opposition Result	Opposition Result	Opposition Result	Opposition Result	Opposition Result	Opposition Result	Opposition Result	Opposition Result	Rank
Ludwig Paischer	−60 kg	Bye	Ahamdi (MAR); W 1010–0000	Fallon (GBR); W 0002–0001	Kim K-J (PRK); W 0020–0000	Dragin (FRA); W 1001–0000	Bye			Choi M-H (KOR); L 0000–1000	2nd place, silver medalist(s)

Women

Athlete	Event	Round of 32	Round of 16	Quarterfinals	Semifinals	Repechage 1	Repechage 2	Repechage 3	Final / BM	
Athlete	Event	Opposition Result	Opposition Result	Opposition Result	Opposition Result	Opposition Result	Opposition Result	Opposition Result	Opposition Result	Rank
Sabrina Filzmoser	−57 kg	Kye S-H (PRK); L 0001–1001	Did not advance							
Claudia Heill	−63 kg	Clark (GBR); W 1011–0100	González (CUB); L 0001–0010	Did not advance		Bye	Wang C-F (TPE); W 1010–0010	Barreto (VEN); W 0030–0001	Won O-I (PRK); L 0001–0110	5

== Sailing ==
Men

Athlete	Event	Race											Net points	Final rank
Athlete	Event	1	2	3	4	5	6	7	8	9	10	M*	Net points	Final rank
Andreas Geritzer	Laser	28	6	2	30	20	~~44~~; ~~BFD~~	44	18	9	CAN	EL	157	19
Florian Reichstädter; Matthias Schmid	470	24	19	~~25~~	24	14	24	24	5	19	11	EL	164	24
Christian Nehammer; Hans Spitzauer	Star	~~14~~	10	11	6	14	4	12	4	12	14	EL	87	12

Women

Athlete	Event	Race											Net points	Final rank
Athlete	Event	1	2	3	4	5	6	7	8	9	10	M*	Net points	Final rank
Carolina Flatscher; Sylvia Vogl	470	9	~~20~~; ~~DSQ~~	13	7	1	7	1	13	6	11	16	84	8

Open

Athlete	Event	Race																Net points	Final rank
Athlete	Event	1	2	3	4	5	6	7	8	9	10	11	12	13	14	15	M*	Net points	Final rank
Nico Delle Karth; Nikolaus Resch	49er	9	2	~~14~~	8	13	7	5	7	7	13	5	1	CAN	CAN	CAN	22	99	8
Roman Hagara; Hans-Peter Steinacher	Tornado	12	10	~~14~~	10	11	3	3	9	5	5	—					14	82	9

M = Medal race; EL = Eliminated – did not advance into the medal race; CAN = Race cancelled

== Shooting ==
Men

Athlete	Event	Qualification		Final	
Athlete	Event	Points	Rank	Points	Rank
Thomas Farnik	10 m air rifle	594	10	Did not advance	
Thomas Farnik	50 m rifle 3 positions	1171	7 Q	1268.9	5
Mario Knögler	50 m rifle prone	590	30	Did not advance	
Mario Knögler	50 m rifle 3 positions	1170	8 Q	1268.4	6
Christian Planer	10 m air rifle	589	30	Did not advance	
Christian Planer	50 m rifle prone	588	41	Did not advance	

== Swimming ==
Men

Athlete	Event	Heat		Semifinal		Final	
Athlete	Event	Time	Rank	Time	Rank	Time	Rank
David Brandl	400 m freestyle	3:48.63 NR	20	—		Did not advance	
Florian Janistyn	1500 m freestyle	15:12.46 NR	21	—		Did not advance	
Dinko Jukić	200 m butterfly	1:55.96	12 Q	1:55.65 NR	10	Did not advance	
Dinko Jukić	200 m individual medley	2:00.57	16 Q	2:00.98	16	Did not advance	
Dinko Jukić	400 m individual medley	4:15.48 NR	15	—		Did not advance	
Dominik Koll	200 m freestyle	1:47.81 NR	16 Q	1:47.87	13	Did not advance	
Hunor Mate	100 m breaststroke	1:00.93 NR	18	Did not advance			
Hunor Mate	200 m breaststroke	2:11.56	21	Did not advance			
Maxim Podoprigora	200 m breaststroke	2:14.43	35	Did not advance			
Markus Rogan	100 m backstroke	54.22	13 Q	53.80	9	Did not advance	
Markus Rogan	200 m backstroke	1:56.64	3 Q	1:56.34	3 Q	1:55.49 NR	4
Sebastian Stoss	200 m backstroke	1:59.44	19	Did not advance			
Dominik Koll; David Brandl; Florian Janistyn; Markus Rogan	4 × 200 m freestyle relay	7:11.45 NR	9	—		Did not advance	

Women

Athlete	Event	Heat		Semifinal		Final	
Athlete	Event	Time	Rank	Time	Rank	Time	Rank
Nina Dittrich	200 m butterfly	2:09.85 NR	17	Did not advance			
Mirna Jukić	100 m breaststroke	1:07.06	3 Q	1:07.27	3 Q	1:07.34	3rd place, bronze medalist(s)
Mirna Jukić	200 m breaststroke	2:24.39	3 Q	2:23.76	3 Q	2:23.24 NR	4
Birgit Koschischek	100 m freestyle	55.62 NR	29	Did not advance			
Birgit Koschischek	100 m butterfly	59.07 NR	26	Did not advance			
Jördis Steinegger	200 m freestyle	2:00.52 NR	26	Did not advance			
Jördis Steinegger	400 m freestyle	4:09.72 NR	16	—		Did not advance	
Jördis Steinegger	800 m freestyle	8:36.40 NR	22	—		Did not advance	
Jördis Steinegger	400 m individual medley	4:45.15 NR	26	—		Did not advance	

== Synchronized swimming ==
Athlete	Event	Technical routine		Free routine (preliminary)			Free routine (final)		
Athlete	Event	Points	Rank	Points	Total (technical + free)	Rank	Points	Total (technical + free)	Rank
Nadine Brandl; Elisabeth Mahn	Duet	41.250	21	41.167	82.417	22	Did not advance		

== Table tennis ==
All five singles players participated in the team events, with Veronika Heine completing the women's team and Daniel Habesohn as a reserve for the men's team.

Singles

Athlete	Event	Preliminary round	Round 1	Round 2	Round 3	Round 4	Quarterfinals	Semifinals	Final / BM	
Athlete	Event	Opposition Result	Opposition Result	Opposition Result	Opposition Result	Opposition Result	Opposition Result	Opposition Result	Opposition Result	Rank
Chen Weixing	Men's singles	Bye		Kamal (IND); W 4–1	Wang H (CHN); L 0–4	Did not advance				
Robert Gardos	Men's singles	Bye	Ri C-G (PRK); W 4–3	Primorac (CRO); L 2–4	Did not advance					
Werner Schlager	Men's singles	Bye			Yoon J-Y (KOR); W 4–3	Wang Lq (CHN); L 0–4	Did not advance			
Li Qiangbing	Women's singles	Bye		Tan (ITA); W 4–2	Wu Jd (GER); W 4–3	Tie Y N (HKG); L 3–4	Did not advance			
Liu Jia	Women's singles	Bye			Li J (NED); L 1–4	Did not advance				

Team

Athlete	Event	Group round		Semifinals	Bronze playoff 1	Bronze playoff 2	Bronze medal	Final	
Athlete	Event	Opposition Result	Rank	Opposition Result	Opposition Result	Opposition Result	Opposition Result	Opposition Result	Rank
Chen Weixing; Robert Gardos; Werner Schlager	Men's team	Group A China; L 0 – 3 Greece; W 3 – 0 Australia; W 3 – 0	2	Did not advance	Croatia; W 3 – 1	Japan; W 3 – 1	South Korea; L 1 – 3	Did not advance	4
Veronika Heine; Li Qiangbing; Liu Jia	Women's team	Group A China; L 0 – 3 Croatia; W 3 – 0 Dominican Republic; W 3 – 0	2	Did not advance	Japan; L 0 – 3	Did not advance			

== Tennis ==
Athlete	Event	Round of 64	Round of 32	Round of 16	Quarterfinals	Semifinals	Final / BM	
Athlete	Event	Opposition Score	Opposition Score	Opposition Score	Opposition Score	Opposition Score	Opposition Score	Rank
Jürgen Melzer	Men's singles	Daniel (BRA); W 6–7^{(9–11)}, 6–1, 8–6	Wawrinka (SUI); W 6–4, 6–0	Lu Y-H (TPE); W 6–2, 6–4	Nadal (ESP); L 0–6, 4–6	Did not advance		
Julian Knowle; Jürgen Melzer	Men's doubles	—	Kiefer / Schüttler (GER); W 6–7^{(3–7)}, 6–3, 6–1	B Bryan / M Bryan (USA); L 6–7^{(2–7)}, 4–6	Did not advance			
Sybille Bammer	Women's singles	Medina Garrigues (ESP); W 6–2, 4–6, 6–4	Schnyder (SUI); W 6–4, 6–4	Šafářová (CZE); W 7–5, 6–4	Zvonareva (RUS); L 3–6, 6–3, 3–6	Did not advance		

== Triathlon ==
Athlete	Event	Swim (1.5 km)	Trans 1	Bike (40 km)	Trans 2	Run (10 km)	Total Time	Rank
Simon Agoston	Men's	18:20	0:30	59:00	0:31	35:02	1:53:23.98	38
Kate Allen	Women's	20:57	0:32	1:05:24	0:35	34:32	2:02:00.69	14
Eva Dollinger	Women's	20:04	0:25	Did not finish				
Tania Haiböck	Women's	21:03	0:28	1:05:22	0:33	36:37	2:04:03.16	27

== Volleyball ==
=== Beach ===
Four Austrian beach volleyball teams had qualified for the Olympics, but the women's team Montagnolli - Swoboda was replaced by the Swiss team Kuhn - Schwer, because of medical reasons. There are now three beach volley teams in the games:

Athlete	Event	Preliminary round	Standing	Round of 16	Quarterfinals	Semifinals	Final / BM	
Athlete	Event	Opposition Score	Standing	Opposition Score	Opposition Score	Opposition Score	Opposition Score	Rank
Clemens Doppler; Peter Gartmayer	Men's	Pool D Barsouk – Kolodinsky (RUS); W 2 – 1 (21–16, 18–21, 16–14); Araújo – Luiz (BRA); W 2 – 1 (20–22, 21–19, 15–11); Amore – Lione (ITA); W 2 – 0 (21–19, 24–22)	1 Q	Geor – Gia (GEO); L 1 – 2 (21–19, 16–21, 13–15)	Did not advance			
Florian Gosch; Alexander Horst	Men's	Pool A Wu – Xu (CHN); L 0 – 2 (16–21, 15–21); Herrera – Mesa (ESP); L 0 – 2 (14–21, 12–21); Kais – Vesik (EST); W 2 – 1 (21–16, 18–21, 15–12); Lucky Losers; Heyer - Heuscher (SUI); W 2 – 0 (21–11, 21–19)	3 Q	Pļaviņš – Samoilovs (LAT); W 2 – 0 (21–17, 21–18)	Araújo – Luiz (BRA); L 0 – 2 (20–22, 17–21)	Did not advance		
Doris Schwaiger; Stefanie Schwaiger	Women's	Pool A Arvaniti – Karantasiou (GRE); W 2 – 0 (21–18, 21–18); Talita – Renata (BRA); L 0 – 2 (18–21, 19–21); Candelas – García (MEX); W 2 – 0 (21–17, 21–10)	2 Q	Goller – Ludwig (GER); W 2 – 1 (23–21, 11–21, 18–16)	Tian J – Wang J (CHN); L 0 – 2 (12–21, 12–21)	Did not advance		

== See also ==
- Austria at the 2008 Summer Paralympics
