= Bernd Rücker =

German sport shooter

Bernd Rücker (born 28 May 1965) is a German sport shooter who competed in the 1988 Summer Olympics, in the 1992 Summer Olympics, and in the 1996 Summer Olympics.

Current world records held in 300 metre rifle prone
Men	Individual	600	Harald Stenvaag (NOR); Bernd Rücker (GER); Josselin Henry (FRA); Vebjørn Berg (NOR); Stefan Raser (AUT); Remi Moreno Flores (FRA); Karl Olsson (SWE)	15 August 1990; 31 July 1994; 5 August 2010; 5 August 2010; 27 July 2015; 23 September 2019; 23 September 2019	Moscow (URS); Tolmezzo (ITA); Munich (GER); Munich (GER); Maribor (SLO); Tolmezzo (ITA); Tolmezzo (ITA)
