= Mohamed Amer =

Mohamed Amer may refer to:

- Mohamed Amer (sport shooter) (born 1969), Egyptian sport shooter
- Mohamed Amer (handballer) (born 1987), Egyptian handball player
- Mohamed Amer (fencer) (born 1997), Egyptian fencer
- Mohamed Amer Al-Nahdi (born 1967), Emirati runner

== See also ==
- Mohammed Amer (born 1981), American stand-up comedian and writer
