= Qiu Jian =

Qiu Jian may refer to:

- Qiu Jian (sport shooter) (born 1975), sports shooter
- Qiu Jian (丘建), military officer of the Cao Wei state in the Three Kingdoms period, involved in Zhong Hui's Rebellion in 264
