= Shooting at the 2012 Summer Olympics – Men's 10 metre air rifle =

Men's 10 metre air rifle at the Games of the XXX Olympiad
- Venue: Royal Artillery Barracks
- Date: 30 July 2012
- Competitors: 47 from 33 nations
- Winning score: 702.1

Medalists
| 1st place, gold medalist(s) | | Alin Moldoveanu | Romania |
| 2nd place, silver medalist(s) | | Niccolò Campriani | Italy |
| 3rd place, bronze medalist(s) | | Gagan Narang | India |

The Men's 10 metre air rifle event at the 2012 Olympic Games took place on 30 July 2012 at the Royal Artillery Barracks.

The event consisted of two rounds: a qualifier and a final. In the qualifier, each shooter fired 60 shots with an air rifle at 10 metres distance from the standing position. Scores for each shot were in increments of 1, with a maximum score of 10. Defending gold medalist Abhinav Bindra failed to qualify for the final.

The top 8 shooters in the qualifying round moved on to the final round. There, they fired an additional 10 shots. These shots scored in increments of .1, with a maximum score of 10.9. The total score from all 70 shots was used to determine final ranking.

Gun - 4.5 mm Calibre Rifle Maximum 5.5 kg Bullet - 4.5 mm Pellets BullsEye - 0.55 mm Time for Each Shot - 75 seconds

Alin Moldoveanu of Romania won the gold medal by scoring 702.1. Gagan Narang won the Bronze Medal in the Men's 10 m Air Rifle Event at the 2012 Summer Olympics in London with a final score of 701.1. It was India's second consecutive medal in the event.

== Records ==
Prior to this competition, the existing world and Olympic records were as follows.

Qualification records
| World record | Tevarit Majchacheeap (THA) | 600 | Langkawi, Malaysia | 27 January 2000 |
| Olympic record | Zhu Qinan (CHN) | 599 | Athens, Greece | 16 August 2004 |

Final records
| World record | Zhu Qinan (CHN) | 703.8 (600+103.8) | Wrocław, Poland | 22 August 2011 |
| Olympic record | Zhu Qinan (CHN) | 702.7 (599+103.7) | Athens, Greece | 16 August 2004 |

== Qualification round ==
| Rank | Athlete | Country | 1 | 2 | 3 | 4 | 5 | 6 | Total | Inner 10s | Notes |
|---|---|---|---|---|---|---|---|---|---|---|---|
| 1 | Niccolò Campriani | Italy | 100 | 100 | 100 | 99 | 100 | 100 | 599 | 56 | Q |
| 2 | Alin Moldoveanu | Romania | 100 | 100 | 100 | 100 | 99 | 100 | 599 | 53 | Q |
| 3 | Gagan Narang | India | 100 | 100 | 98 | 100 | 100 | 100 | 598 | 53 | Q |
| 4 | Wang Tao | China | 99 | 100 | 100 | 100 | 100 | 99 | 598 | 52 | Q |
| 5 | Illia Charheika | Belarus | 100 | 100 | 100 | 100 | 99 | 98 | 597 | 52 | Q |
| 6 | Ole Magnus Bakken | Norway | 100 | 100 | 100 | 100 | 100 | 97 | 597 | 47 | Q |
| 7 | Peter Hellenbrand | Netherlands | 97 | 99 | 100 | 100 | 100 | 100 | 596 | 51 | Q |
| 8 | Pierre Edmond Piasecki | France | 100 | 99 | 100 | 100 | 98 | 99 | 596 | 50 | Q |
| 9 | Sergy Rikhter | Israel | 99 | 98 | 98 | 100 | 100 | 100 | 595 | 50 | |
| 10 | Zhu Qinan | China | 99 | 99 | 99 | 100 | 100 | 98 | 595 | 50 | |
| 11 | Vitali Bubnovich | Belarus | 100 | 100 | 99 | 100 | 98 | 98 | 595 | 46 | |
| 12 | Julian Justus | Germany | 99 | 100 | 100 | 98 | 100 | 98 | 595 | 44 | |
| 13 | Péter Sidi | Hungary | 99 | 98 | 100 | 100 | 99 | 98 | 594 | 52 | |
| 14 | Are Hansen | Norway | 97 | 100 | 99 | 99 | 100 | 99 | 594 | 51 | |
| 15 | Alexei Kamenski | Russia | 99 | 100 | 100 | 99 | 96 | 100 | 594 | 46 | |
| 16 | Abhinav Bindra | India | 99 | 99 | 100 | 100 | 99 | 97 | 594 | 45 | |
| 17 | Kim Jong-Hyun | South Korea | 98 | 100 | 99 | 99 | 98 | 99 | 593 | 46 | |
| 18 | Serhiy Kulish | Ukraine | 99 | 99 | 100 | 100 | 97 | 98 | 593 | 45 | |
| 19 | Artur Ayvazyan | Ukraine | 99 | 99 | 100 | 100 | 99 | 96 | 593 | 45 | |
| 20 | Alexandre Sokolov | Russia | 99 | 100 | 96 | 99 | 100 | 99 | 593 | 44 | |
| 21 | Ruslan Ismailov | Kyrgyzstan | 100 | 99 | 97 | 99 | 99 | 99 | 593 | 43 | |
| 22 | Anton Rizov | Bulgaria | 99 | 99 | 100 | 100 | 97 | 98 | 593 | 43 | |
| 23 | Nyantain Bayaraa | Mongolia | 100 | 96 | 99 | 100 | 98 | 100 | 593 | 42 | |
| 24 | James Huckle | Great Britain | 99 | 98 | 100 | 100 | 98 | 98 | 593 | 42 | |
| 25 | Tino Mohaupt | Germany | 100 | 99 | 98 | 96 | 99 | 100 | 592 | 50 | |
| 26 | Jeremy Monnier | France | 98 | 99 | 99 | 99 | 99 | 98 | 592 | 46 | |
| 27 | Jonathan Hall | United States | 100 | 98 | 100 | 96 | 99 | 99 | 592 | 42 | |
| 28 | Thomas Farnik | Austria | 97 | 99 | 100 | 98 | 98 | 99 | 591 | 47 | |
| 29 | Amgad Hosen | Egypt | 100 | 98 | 99 | 97 | 98 | 99 | 591 | 45 | |
| 30 | Nemanja Mirosavljev | Serbia | 100 | 98 | 98 | 97 | 100 | 98 | 591 | 43 | |
| 31 | Jozef Gönci | Slovakia | 99 | 98 | 96 | 99 | 99 | 100 | 591 | 41 | |
| 32 | Han Jin-Seop | South Korea | 97 | 100 | 98 | 99 | 100 | 96 | 590 | 46 | |
| 33 | Václav Haman | Czech Republic | 97 | 97 | 97 | 100 | 99 | 100 | 590 | 45 | |
| 34 | Marco De Nicolo | Italy | 99 | 99 | 98 | 97 | 99 | 98 | 590 | 44 | |
| 35 | Matthew Emmons | United States | 97 | 98 | 100 | 99 | 99 | 97 | 590 | 42 | |
| 36 | Bojan Durković | Croatia | 97 | 100 | 100 | 99 | 97 | 97 | 590 | 42 | |
| 37 | Pascal Lorentan | Switzerland | 99 | 100 | 99 | 99 | 94 | 98 | 589 | 43 | |
| 38 | Midori Yajima | Japan | 97 | 98 | 99 | 98 | 99 | 99 | 589 | 37 | |
| 39 | Simon Beyeler | Switzerland | 95 | 99 | 100 | 98 | 98 | 98 | 588 | 44 | |
| 40 | William Godward | Australia | 99 | 99 | 98 | 99 | 98 | 95 | 588 | 44 | |
| 41 | Javier López | Spain | 97 | 97 | 99 | 99 | 98 | 98 | 588 | 38 | |
| 42 | Dane Sampson | Australia | 98 | 98 | 99 | 97 | 97 | 98 | 587 | 40 | |
| 43 | Petar Gorša | Croatia | 98 | 98 | 96 | 99 | 99 | 96 | 586 | 38 | |
| 44 | Nedžad Fazlija | Bosnia and Herzegovina | 96 | 97 | 96 | 99 | 98 | 99 | 585 | 36 | |
| 45 | Mangala Samarakoon | Sri Lanka | 97 | 97 | 99 | 97 | 97 | 96 | 583 | 31 | |
| 46 | Cory Niefer | Canada | 94 | 97 | 98 | 99 | 97 | 96 | 581 | 31 | |
| 47 | Rudi Lausarot | Uruguay | 99 | 94 | 97 | 96 | 93 | 96 | 575 | 28 | |

== Final ==
| Rank | Athlete | Qual | 1 | 2 | 3 | 4 | 5 | 6 | 7 | 8 | 9 | 10 | Final | Total |
|---|---|---|---|---|---|---|---|---|---|---|---|---|---|---|
| 1st place, gold medalist(s) | Alin Moldoveanu (ROU) | 599 | 10.3 | 10.5 | 10.1 | 10.3 | 10.6 | 9.9 | 10.3 | 10.3 | 10.5 | 10.3 | 103.1 | 702.1 |
| 2nd place, silver medalist(s) | Niccolò Campriani (ITA) | 599 | 9.7 | 10.2 | 10.7 | 10.2 | 10.4 | 10.8 | 10.8 | 9.9 | 9.4 | 10.4 | 102.5 | 701.5 |
| 3rd place, bronze medalist(s) | Gagan Narang (IND) | 598 | 10.7 | 9.6 | 10.6 | 10.7 | 10.4 | 10.6 | 9.9 | 9.5 | 10.3 | 10.7 | 103.1 | 701.1 |
| 4 | Wang Tao (CHN) | 598 | 10.6 | 10.6 | 9.3 | 10.7 | 10.4 | 10.4 | 10.8 | 9.2 | 10.0 | 10.4 | 102.4 | 700.4 |
| 5 | Peter Hellenbrand (NED) | 596 | 10.4 | 10.7 | 10.1 | 9.8 | 10.6 | 10.6 | 10.4 | 10.9 | 10.6 | 9.7 | 103.8 | 699.8 |
| 6 | Pierre Edmond Piasecki (FRA) | 596 | 10.7 | 10.6 | 10.7 | 9.9 | 10.4 | 10.5 | 9.9 | 10.6 | 9.8 | 10.0 | 103.1 | 699.1 |
| 7 | Illia Charheika (BLR) | 597 | 9.9 | 9.9 | 10.4 | 10.2 | 10.7 | 10.5 | 9.7 | 9.9 | 10.1 | 10.3 | 101.6 | 698.6 |
| 8 | Ole Magnus Bakken (NOR) | 597 | 9.7 | 9.4 | 9.0 | 6.6 | 10.2 | 10.4 | 9.9 | 10.2 | 9.7 | 9.4 | 94.5 | 691.5 |
