= Luis Martínez (sport shooter) =

Spanish sport shooter (born 1976)

Personal information
- Full name: Luis Jesús Martínez Encabo
- Nationality: Spain
- Born: 15 April 1976 (age 50) Logroño, La Rioja, Spain
- Height: 1.72 m (5 ft 7 1/2 in)
- Weight: 70 kg (154 lb)

Sport
- Sport: Shooting
- Event(s): 10 m air rifle (AR60); 50 m rifle prone (FR60PR)
- Club: Tiro Club Rey Pastor
- Coached by: Piotr Kosmatko

Luis Jesús Martínez Encabo (born April 15, 1976 in Logroño, La Rioja) is a Spanish sport shooter. Martinez represented Spain at the 2008 Summer Olympics in Beijing, where he competed only in two rifle shooting events. He scored a total of 589 points in the men's 10 m air rifle by two points behind Slovenia's Rajmond Debevec from the fifth attempt, finishing only in thirty-second place. Few days later, Martinez placed fiftieth in his second event, 50 m rifle prone, by one point ahead of Oman's Dadallah Al-Bulushi from the final attempt, with a total score of 582 targets.
