= Haiböck =

Haiböck is a German surname, mostly used in Austria. Notable people with the surname include:

- Josef Haiböck (1917–2002), Wehrmacht fighter pilot and Austrian air force general
- Tania Haiböck (born 1978), Austrian triathlete
