= Konstantin Prikhodtchenko =

Russian sports shooter

Personal information
- Full name: Konstantin Vladimirovich; Prikhodtchenko
- Nationality: Russia
- Born: 29 March 1972 (age 54) Belgorod, Russian SFSR
- Height: 1.85 m (6 ft 1 in)
- Weight: 80 kg (176 lb)

Sport
- Sport: Shooting
- Event(s): 10 m air rifle (AR60); 50 m rifle prone (FR60PR); 50 m rifle 3 positions (STR3X20)
- Club: CSKA Moscow
- Coached by: Victor Vlasov
Medal record
Men's shooting
Representing Russia
World Championships
Silver medal – second place	2002 Lahti	STR3X20

Konstantin Vladimirovich Prikhodtchenko (Russian: Константин Владимирович Приходченко; born 29 March 1972 in Belgorod) is a Russian sport shooter. He won a silver medal for the 50 m rifle three positions at the 2002 ISSF World Shooting Championships in Lahti, Finland, with a score of 1255.4 points. He is also a member of CSKA Moscow and is coached and trained by Victor Vlasov.

At age thirty-two, Prikhodtchenko made his official debut for the 2004 Summer Olympics in Athens, where he placed twenty-ninth in the preliminary rounds of the men's 10 m air rifle, for a total score of 589 points, tying his position with three other shooters including Slovenia's Rajmond Debevec.

At the 2008 Summer Olympics in Beijing, Prikodtchenko competed only in two rifle shooting events. He scored a total of 698.4 points (595 in the preliminary rounds and 103.4 in the final), and a bonus of 10.0 from a shoot-off (against Hungary's Péter Sidi) in the men's 10 m air rifle, finishing only in fifth place. Few days later, Prikodtchenko placed fifth again this time in the 50 m rifle prone, by one tenth of a point (0.1) behind Norway's Vebjørn Berg, with a total score of 699.0 points (595 in the preliminary rounds and 104 in the final).
