= Beat Müller =

Swiss sport shooter (born 1978)

Personal information
- Nationality: Switzerland
- Born: 8 February 1978 (age 48) Bern, Switzerland
- Height: 1.75 m (5 ft 9 in)
- Weight: 100 kg (220 lb)

Sport
- Sport: Shooting
- Event(s): 10 m air rifle (AR60); 50 m rifle prone (FR60PR); 50 m rifle 3 positions (FR3X40); 300 m rifle prone (300FR60PR); 300 m rifle 3 positions (300FR3X40); 300 m standard rifle (300STR3X20)
- Club: Sportschützen Taters
- Coached by: Wolfram Waibel Jr.

Beat Müller (born 8 February 1978 in Bern) is a Swiss sport shooter. He won a bronze medal in the men's 300 m rifle prone (300FR60PR) at the 2008 European Shooting Championships in Granada, Spain, accumulating a score of 599 points. Muller is also a member of Sportschützen Taters, and is coached and trained by former Olympian Wolfram Waibel Jr. of Austria.

Muller represented Switzerland at the 2008 Summer Olympics, where he competed in the men's 50 m rifle 3 positions, along with his teammate Marcel Bürge. He was able to shoot 395 targets in a prone position, 380 in standing, and 389 in kneeling, for a total score of 1,164 points, finishing only in twenty-first place.

At the 2010 ISSF World Shooting Championships, he won a gold medal the 300m standard rifle team event, along with teammates Marcel Bürge and Olivier Schaffter.
