= Matthew Inabinet =

Australian sports shooter (born 1984)

Personal information
- Full name: Matthew Robert Inabinet
- Nationality: Australia
- Born: 30 September 1984 (age 42) Canberra, Australia
- Height: 1.84 m (6 ft 1/2 in)
- Weight: 87 kg (192 lb)

Sport
- Sport: Shooting
- Events: 10 m air rifle (AR40); 50 m rifle prone (FR60PR); 50 m rifle 3 positions (STR3X20)
- Club: ACT Smallbore Rifle Club
- Coached by: Gorden Degroen

Matthew Robert Inabinet (born 30 September 1984 in Canberra) is an Australian sport shooter. He won a total of three medals (two golds and one silver) in both air and small-bore rifle at the Oceania Shooting Championships (2003, 2005, and 2007).

At age nineteen, Inabinet became the youngest Australian shooter to qualify for the 2004 Summer Olympics in Athens, where he competed in the men's 10 m air rifle, along with his teammate Timothy Lowndes. He placed forty-first in the preliminary rounds of this event, with a total score of 584 targets, tying his position with Norway's Espen Berg-Knutsen.

Four years after competing in his last Olympics, Inabinet qualified for his second Australian team, as a 23-year-old, at the 2008 Summer Olympics in Beijing, by winning the air rifle from the 2007 Oceania Shooting Championships in Sydney. He scored a total of 579 points in the preliminary rounds of the 10 m air rifle, by one point ahead of Pakistan's Siddique Umer, finishing only in forty-seventh place. Nearly a week, Inabinet competed for his second event, 50 m rifle 3 positions, where he was able to shoot 389 targets in a prone position, and 376 each in standing and in kneeling, for a total score of 1,141 points, finishing only in forty-fifth place.
