= Dadallah Al-Bulushi =

Omani sport shooter (born 1958)

Personal information
- Full name: Dadallah Noor Mohamed; Al-Bulushi
- Nationality: Oman
- Born: 17 August 1958 (age 67) Makran, Oman
- Height: 1.72 m (5 ft 7 1/2 in)
- Weight: 86 kg (190 lb)

Sport
- Sport: Shooting
- Event(s): 50 m rifle prone 50 m rifle 3 positions
- Club: Oman Shooting Club
- Coached by: Hilal Bin Sultan Al Rasheedi

Dadallah Noor Mohamed Al-Bulushi (Arabic: داد الله نور محمد البلوشي; born August 17, 1958, in Makran) is an Omani sport shooter. Al-Bulushi was one of sixteen athletes, including his brother Abdul Latif, who made the nation's official debut at the 1984 Summer Olympics in Los Angeles, where he competed in two rifle shooting events. He placed forty-ninth in the 50 m rifle prone, with a total score of 582 points, tying his position with three other shooters including Israel's Itzhak Yonassi. Few days later, he competed for his second event, 50 m rifle 3 positions, where he was able to shoot 387 targets in a prone position, 341 in kneeling, and 322 in standing, for an overall total score of 1,050 points, finishing only in fiftieth place.

Twenty-four years after competing in his first Olympics, Al-Bulushi qualified for his second Omani team as a 49-year-old at the 2008 Summer Olympics in Beijing by receiving an additional place in rifle shooting. He placed fifty-first in the 50 m rifle prone, by one target ahead of Cuba's Eliécer Pérez from the final attempt, with a total score of 582 points. For being the most experienced team member, Al-Bulushi also became Oman's flag bearer at the opening ceremony.
