= Doron Egozi =

Israeli Olympic sport shooter

Personal information
- Birth name: דורון אגוזי
- Born: October 25, 1980 (age 44); Ma'abarot, Israel
- Height: 5 ft 7 in (170 cm)
- Weight: 132 lb (60 kg)

Sport
- Country: Israel
- Sport: Sport shooting
- Event(s): 50 metre rifle three positions and 10 metre air rifle
- Coached by: Guy Starik

Doron Egozi (Hebrew: דורון אגוזי; born October 25, 1980) is an Israeli Olympic sport shooter.

== Biography ==
Egozi is Jewish, and was born in Ma'abarot, Israel. He is coached by Israeli Olympian Guy Starik.

In July 2007, Egozi came in eighth in the 50 metre rifle three positions at the European Championships in Spain.

He competed on behalf of Israel at the 2008 Summer Olympics in Beijing, China, in the Men's 50 metre rifle three positions, in which he came in 36th, and in the Men's 10 metre air rifle, in which he came in 41st.
