= Nemanja Mirosavljev =

Serbian sport shooter (born 1970)

Personal information
- Born: 10 May 1970 (age 56) Novi Sad, SR Serbia, SFR Yugoslavia
Medal record
Men's shooting
Representing FR Yugoslavia / Serbia and Montenegro / Serbia
World Championships
Bronze medal – third place	2010 Munich	50 m Rifle TP
European Championships
Gold medal – first place	2009 Osijek	50m rifle prone team
Silver medal – second place	1991 Bologna	50 m Rifle TP
Bronze medal – third place	2007 Grenada	50 m Rifle TP
Mediterranean Games
Gold medal – first place	1991 Athens	50 m Rifle Prone
Gold medal – first place	1997 Bari	50 m Rifle TP
Silver medal – second place	2005 Almería	10 m Air Rifle
Silver medal – second place	2005 Almería	50 m Rifle prone
Silver medal – second place	2009 Pescara	50 m Rifle TP
Silver medal – second place	2009 Pescara	50 m Rifle

Nemanja Mirosavljev (Serbian Cyrillic: Немања Миросављев; born 10 May 1970, in Novi Sad, SR Serbia, SFR Yugoslavia) is a Serbian sport shooter. He is currently a member of SD Novi Sad 1790.

Mirosavljev has competed at five Summer Olympics in his career, under three different flags - Independent Olympic Participants, Yugoslavia and also Serbia and Montenegro.

At the 2008 Summer Olympics in Beijing, People's Republic of China, Mirosavljev once again represented his country - Serbia. He gained his qualification by taking 5th place at the 2007 World Cup #2 Rifle, Pistol in Sydney, Australia and competed at the 50 m Rifle 3 Positions Men event in Beijing.

He won the bronze medal in the 50m rifle three positions event at the 2010 World Championships.

He also competed at the 2012 Summer Olympics.

Olympic results
Event	1992	1996	2000	2004	2008	2012
50 metre rifle three positions	9th 1163	—	15th 1161	—	20th 1165	23rd 1162
50 metre rifle prone	—	—	—	—	33rd 590	10th 595
10 metre air rifle	18th 587	15th 589	27th 587	—	17th 593	30th 591
