= Robert Kraskowski =

Polish sports shooter

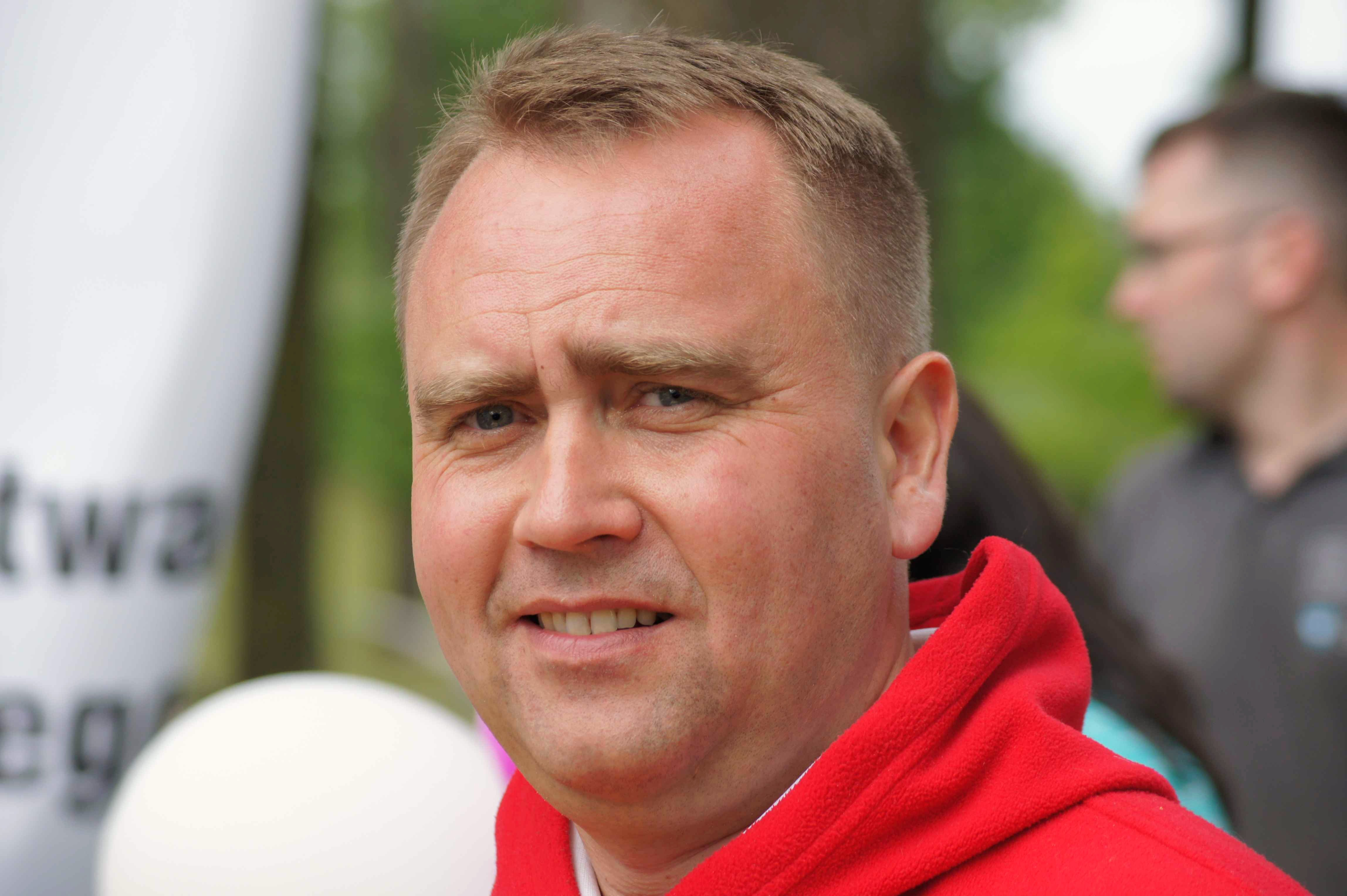

Personal information
- Full name: Robert Roman Kraskowski
- Nationality: Poland
- Born: 21 December 1967 (age 58) Słupsk, Poland
- Height: 1.76 m (5 ft 9 1/2 in)
- Weight: 82 kg (181 lb)

Sport
- Sport: Shooting
- Event(s): 10 m air rifle (AR60); 50 m rifle prone (FR60PR); 50 m rifle 3 positions (STR3X20)
- Club: Legia Warszawa
- Coached by: Eulalia Rolinska

Robert Roman Kraskowski (born 21 December 1967 in Słupsk) is a Polish sports shooter. Kraskowski had won a total of three medals at the ISSF World Cup circuit, including gold for the 10 m air rifle (1992 in Suhl, Germany). He also competed in the rifle shooting events at the 1992 Summer Olympics in Barcelona (only 10 m air rifle) and at the 1996 Summer Olympics in Atlanta.

Twelve years after competing in his last Olympics, Kraskowski qualified for his third Polish team as a 41-year-old at the 2008 Summer Olympics in Beijing by placing sixth for the 10 m air rifle (AR40) from the third meet of the 2006 ISSF World Cup in Munich, Germany. Kraskowski also received additional places for the 50 m rifle prone (FR60PR) and 50 m rifle 3 positions (STR3X20); therefore, he competed in all rifle shooting events.

In his first event, 10 m air rifle, Kraskowski was able to hit a total of 589 points within six attempts, finishing thirty-third in the qualifying rounds. A few days later, he placed twenty-fifth in the 50 m rifle prone, by one target ahead of India's Sanjeev Rajput from the final attempt, with a total score of 591 points. In his third and last event, 50 m rifle 3 positions, Kraskowski was able to shoot 395 targets in a prone position, 373 in standing, and 388 in kneeling, for a total score of 1,156 points, finishing only in thirty-third place.

== Olympic results ==
Event	1992	1996	2008
50 metre rifle three positions	—	22nd 1162	33rd 1156
50 metre rifle prone	—	11th 595	25th 591
10 metre air rifle	13th 588	30th 583	33rd 589
