= Michael Winter (sport shooter) =

German sport shooter (born 1976)

Personal information
- Nationality: Germany
- Born: 20 May 1976 (age 50) Munich, West Germany
- Height: 1.80 m (5 ft 11 in)
- Weight: 75 kg (165 lb)

Sport
- Sport: Shooting
- Event(s): 10 m air rifle (AR60); 50 m rifle prone (FR60PR); 50 m rifle 3 positions (STR3X20)
- Club: HSG München
- Coached by: Claus Dieter Roth

Michael Winter (born May 20, 1976 in Munich) is a German sport shooter. Winter represented Germany at the 2008 Summer Olympics in Beijing, where he competed for all three rifle shooting events.

In his first event, 10 m air rifle, Winter was able to hit a total of 588 points within six attempts, finishing thirty-sixth in the qualifying rounds. Few days later, he placed thirty-first in the 50 m rifle prone, by one target ahead of Switzerland's Marcel Bürge from the final attempt, with a total score of 590 points. In his third and last event, 50 m rifle 3 positions, Winter was able to shoot 396 targets in a prone position, and 385 each in standing and in kneeling, for a total score of 1,166 points, finishing only in seventeenth place.
