= Israel at the 2008 Summer Olympics =

- IOC code: ISR
- NOC: Olympic Committee of Israel
- Website: www.olympicsil.co.il (in Hebrew and English)

in Beijing
- Competitors: 43 in 12 sports
- Flag bearer: Michael Kolganov
- Medals Ranked 80th: Gold 0 Silver 0 Bronze 1 Total 1

Summer Olympics appearances (overview)
- 1952; 1956; 1960; 1964; 1968; 1972; 1976; 1980; 1984; 1988; 1992; 1996; 2000; 2004; 2008; 2012; 2016; 2020; 2024

Israel competed at the 2008 Summer Olympics in Beijing, China. This was Israel's fourteenth participation in the Summer Olympics.

Israel sent 43 athletes to compete in Beijing, the largest Israeli delegation in Olympic history, with the previous record having been 40 in 2000, and was broken in 2016 with 47. The Olympic team was split 23 men and 20 women, which is the largest share of women in Israel's summer Olympic history. This was the youngest delegation in Israel's Olympic history, with about half the team under the age of 23, and many of them were expected to reach their peak in time for the 2012 Olympics in London.

Shooter Guy Starik became the second Israeli in Olympic history to participate in 4 Olympic Games. Three athletes made their third Olympic appearance: pole vaulter Aleksandr Averbukh, who has two European championship titles, two world championship medals and two Olympic finals in his resume, judoka Ariel Ze'evi, three-times European champion and bronze medalist in 2004 Summer Olympics, and canoer Michael Kolganov, former world champion and bronze medalist in 2000 Summer Olympics, who was the flagbearer for Israel in the opening ceremony. 12 other athletes made their second Olympic appearance, while 27 athletes made their Olympic debut at Beijing.

Israel made its Olympic debut in Beijing in the team event in rhythmic gymnastics, women's épée in fencing, women's one-person dinghy (Laser Radial) in sailing, and women's doubles in tennis.

Among the medal hopefuls were Ariel Ze'evi, and also Udi Gal and Gideon Kliger, 3-times world bronze medalists in sailing 470 class, Shahar Tzuberi, world bronze medalist in sailboard Neil Pryde RS:X class, and tennis men's double team Jonathan Erlich and Andy Ram, winners of the 2008 Australian Open and #3 seeds in the Olympic tournament.

== Medalists ==
Medal	Name	Sport	Event
Bronze	Shahar Tzuberi	Sailing	Men's sailboard

=== Other notable achievements ===
Place	Name	Sport	Event
4	Vered Buskila and Nike Kornecki	Sailing	Women's 470 class
5	Gal Yekutiel	Judo	Men's 60 kg
6	Alona Dvornichenko; Katerina Pisetsky; Maria Savenkov; Rachel Vigdorchick; Veronika Vitenberg	Gymnastics	Women's rhythmic team all-around
8	Alexander Shatilov	Gymnastics	Men's floor
9	Irina Risenzon	Gymnastics	Women's rhythmic individual all-around
10	Maayan Davidovich	Sailing	Women's sailboard

== Results summary ==
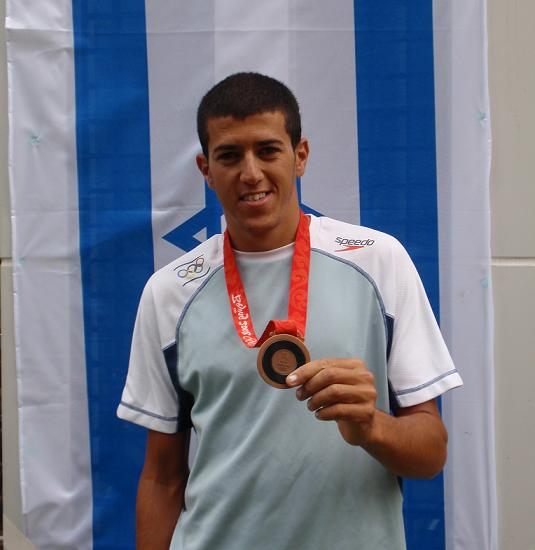
Windsurfer Shahar Tzuberi with his bronze medal

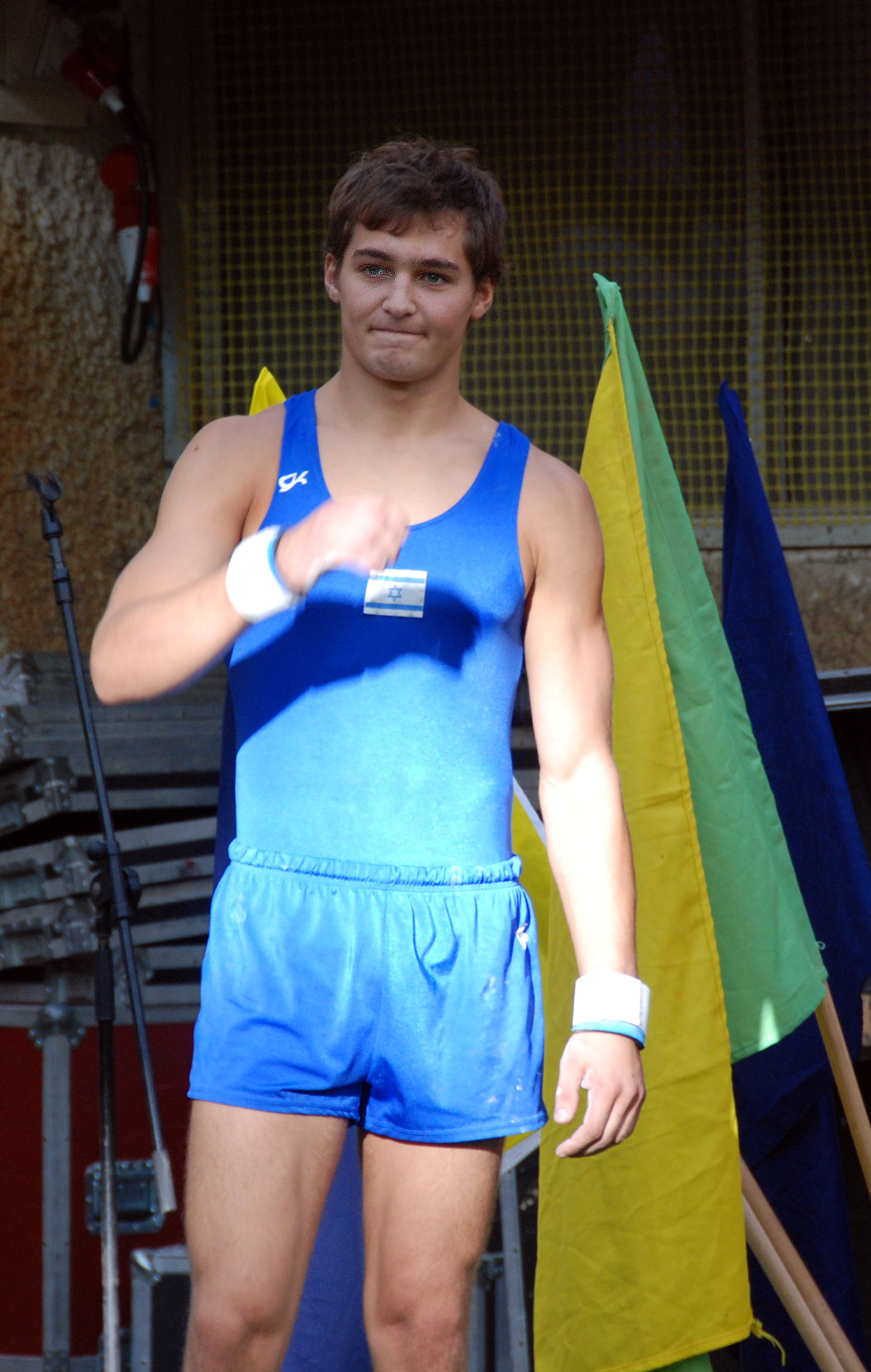
Gymnast Alex Shatilov

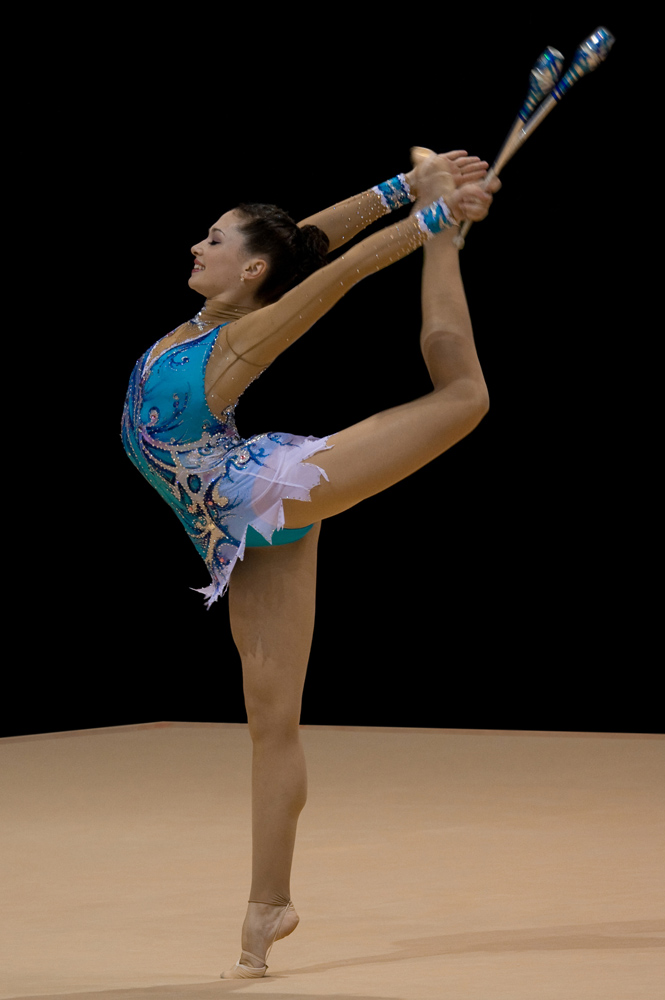
Rhythmic gymnast Irina Risenzon

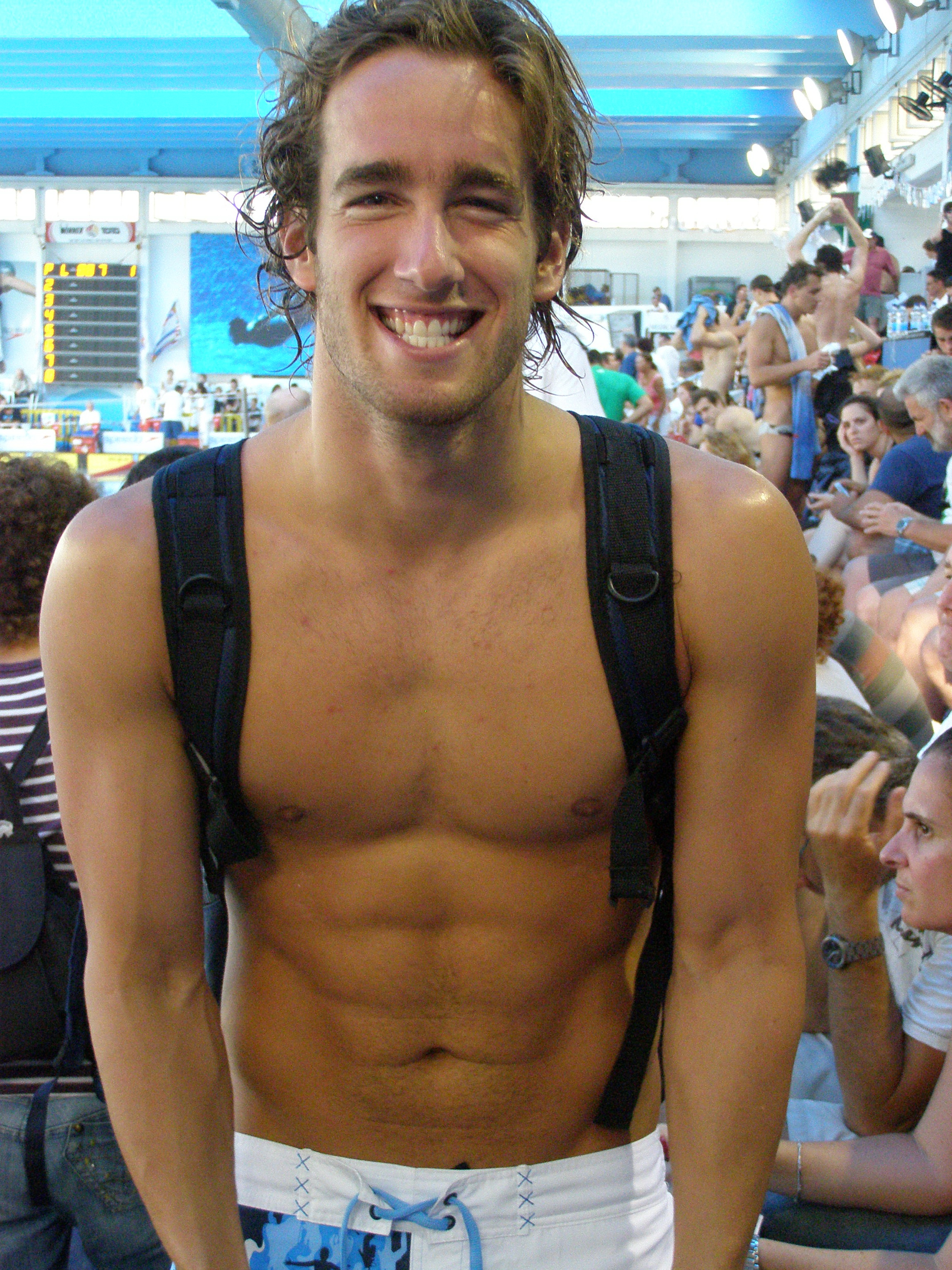
Swimmer Guy Barne'a

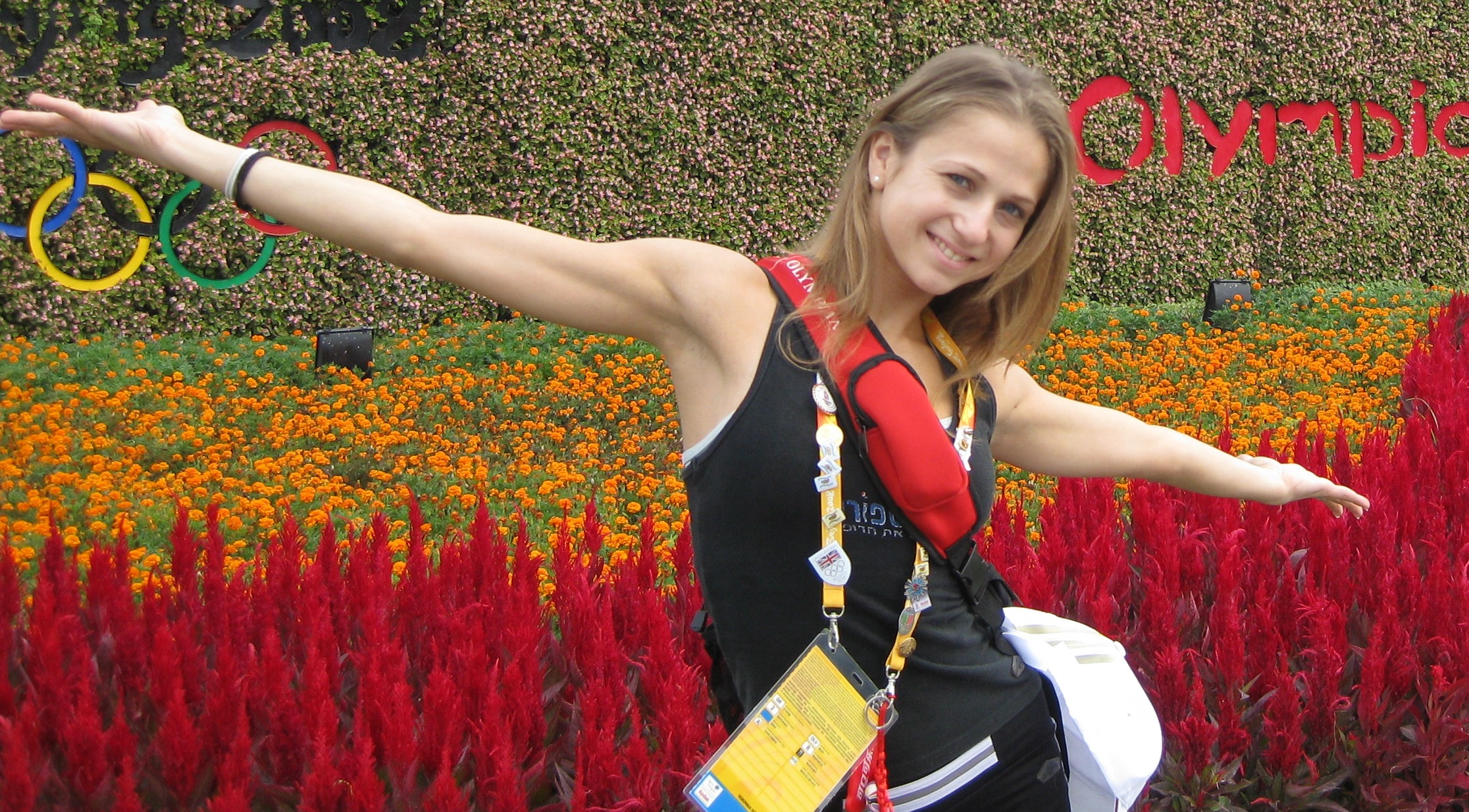
Rhythmic gymnast Veronika Vitenberg

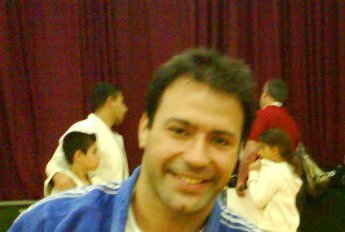
Judoka Ariel Ze'evi

The largest delegation in Israel's Olympic history won just one bronze medal by Shahar Tzuberi in this Olympics, which was below the expectations of the National Olympic committee. However, beside disappointment from failures of medal hopefuls, such as Arik Ze'evi, Udi Gal and Gideon Kliger, and Jonathan Erlich and Andy Ram, there were some fine performances from other athletes.

The sailing team was close to win another medal by Vered Buskila and Nike Kornecki in women's 470 class, who finished in fourth place, while Maayan Davidovich became the first Israeli female windsurfer to place in the top 10.

The Gymnasts excelled and recorded first finals in Israel Olympic history by Alex Shatilov, 8th in men's floor (best achievement in artistic gymnastics), the rhythmic team placed sixth on its debut in the team all-around event, while Irina Risenzon placed 9th in the rhythmic individual all-around event. Also the 14th place of Neta Rivkin, the youngest member of the Olympic team, was a good achievement.

There were plenty of national records in the swimming pool – 11 in 17 races – and 3 swimmers achieved 4 top-16 places between them, more than any previous Olympics. Gal Nevo was the best of them, with 11th place in 400 metres individual medley and 13th place in 200 metres individual medley. Nimrod Shapira Bar-Or got 15th place in 200 metres freestyle, and Guy Barne'a 16th in 100 metres backstroke.

Among the other sports, there was only one notable achievement, Gal Yekutiel's fifth place in judo, which was beyond the expectations from him.

In shooting, 4-times Olympian Guy Starik came close to the final of the rifle prone event, but a miss on the final shot placed him in 12th place, losing on tie break to the 4 shooters ranked above him.

On the down side, all four athletes in track-and-field failed to reach their expected results, all three fencers were eliminated in their first bouts, and four tennis players recorded just one win between them (by Shahar Pe'er) before being eliminated.

== Athletics ==
Four athletes represented Israel in Beijing.

Key

- Note–Ranks given for track events are within the athlete's heat only
- Q = Qualified for the next round
- q = Qualified for the next round as a fastest loser or, in field events, by position without achieving the qualifying target
- NR = National record
- N/A = Round not applicable for the event
- Bye = Athlete not required to compete in round

Men
Track & road events

Athlete	Event	Heat		Final	
Athlete	Event	Result	Rank	Result	Rank
Itai Magidi	3000 m steeplechase	9:05.02	13	Did not advance	
Haile Satayin	Marathon	—N/a		2:30:07	69

Field events

Athlete	Event	Qualification		Final	
Athlete	Event	Distance	Position	Distance	Position
Aleksandr Averbukh	Pole vault	5.45	28	Did not advance	
Niki Palli	High jump	2.20	21	Did not advance	

== Canoeing ==
=== Sprint ===
Michael Kolganov represented Israel in kayaking.

Athlete	Event	Heats		Semifinals		Final	
Athlete	Event	Time	Rank	Time	Rank	Time	Rank
Michael Kolganov	Men's K-1 500 m	1:38.396	1 QS	1:43.145	4	Did not advance	
Michael Kolganov	Men's K-1 1000 m	3:38.207	5 QS	3:43.108	8	Did not advance	

Qualification Legend: QS = Qualify to semi-final; QF = Qualify directly to final

== Fencing ==
Delila Hatuel, Noam Mills and Tomer Or represented Israel in fencing at the games.

Men

Athlete	Event	Round of 32	Round of 16	Quarterfinals	Semifinals	Final / BM	
Athlete	Event	Opposition Score	Opposition Score	Opposition Score	Opposition Score	Opposition Score	Rank
Tomer Or	Individual foil	McGuire (CAN); L 10–11	Did not advance				

Women

Athlete	Event	Round of 64	Round of 32	Round of 16	Quarterfinals	Semifinals	Final / BM	
Athlete	Event	Opposition Score	Opposition Score	Opposition Score	Opposition Score	Opposition Score	Opposition Score	Rank
Noam Mills	Individual épée	—N/a	Flessel-Colovic (FRA); L 8–15	Did not advance				
Delila Hatuel	Individual foil	Bye	Nikichina (RUS); L 9–10	Did not advance				

== Gymnastics ==
=== Artistic ===
Alexander Shatilov represented Israel.

Men

Athlete	Event	Qualification								Final							
Athlete	Event	Apparatus						Total	Rank	Apparatus						Total	Rank
Athlete	Event	F	PH	R	V	PB	HB	Total	Rank	F	PH	R	V	PB	HB	Total	Rank
Alexander Shatilov	All-around	15.600	13.825	14.075	15.575	14.500	14.225	87.800	29	Did not advance							
Alexander Shatilov	Floor	15.600	—N/a					15.600	8 Q	14.125	—N/a					14.125	8

=== Rhythmic ===
Irina Risenzon, Neta Rivkin and a team of 5 gymnasts represented Israel.

Athlete	Event	Qualification						Final					
Athlete	Event	Rope	Hoop	Clubs	Ribbon	Total	Rank	Rope	Hoop	Clubs	Ribbon	Total	Rank
Neta Rivkin	Individual	16.500	16.825	16.450	16.100	65.875	14	Did not advance					
Irina Risenzon	Individual	16.800	17.100	17.125	16.825	67.850	8 Q	17.025	16.350	16.850	16.550	66.775	9

Athlete	Event	Qualification				Final			
Athlete	Event	5 ropes	3 hoops 2 clubs	Total	Rank	5 ropes	3 hoops 2 clubs	Total	Rank
Alona Dvornichenko; Katerina Pisetsky; Maria Savenkov; Rachel Vigdorchick; Veronika Vitenberg	Team	15.300	16.225	31.525	7 Q	16.050	16.050	32.100	6

== Judo ==
3 judoka represented Israel.

Men

Athlete	Event	Preliminary	Round of 32	Round of 16	Quarterfinals	Semifinals	Repechage 1	Repechage 2	Repechage 3	Final / BM	
Athlete	Event	Opposition Result	Opposition Result	Opposition Result	Opposition Result	Opposition Result	Opposition Result	Opposition Result	Opposition Result	Opposition Result	Rank
Gal Yekutiel	−60 kg	Bye	Khashbaatar (MGL); W 0001–0000	Dragin (FRA); L 0001–1001	Did not advance		Khergiani (GEO); W 0001–0000	Kishmakov (RUS); W 0001–0000	Fallon (GBR); W 0200–0101	Houkes (NED); L 0000–1012	5
Ariel Ze'evi	−100 kg	—N/a	Demontfaucon (FRA); W 0010–0001	Grol (NED); L 0001–0010	Did not advance		Corrêa (BRA); L 0001–0011	Did not advance			

Women

Athlete	Event	Round of 32	Round of 16	Quarterfinals	Semifinals	Repechage 1	Repechage 2	Repechage 3	Final / BM	
Athlete	Event	Opposition Result	Opposition Result	Opposition Result	Opposition Result	Opposition Result	Opposition Result	Opposition Result	Opposition Result	Rank
Alice Schlesinger	−63 kg	Bye	Décosse (FRA); L 0000–0011	Did not advance		Žolnir (SLO); L 0000–1001	Did not advance			

== Sailing ==
Seven sailors in five boats represented Israel in Beijing.

Men

Athlete	Event	Race											Net points	Final rank
Athlete	Event	1	2	3	4	5	6	7	8	9	10	M*	Net points	Final rank
Shahar Tzuberi	RS:X	1	3	1	3	17	6	~~19~~	18	1	4	2	58	3rd place, bronze medalist(s)
Udi Gal; Gideon Kliger	470	13	16	13	14	~~30~~; ~~BFD~~	11	15	2	12	12	EL	108	14

Women

Athlete	Event	Race											Net points	Final rank
Athlete	Event	1	2	3	4	5	6	7	8	9	10	M*	Net points	Final rank
Maayan Davidovich	RS:X	13	9	~~20~~	9	13	14	16	4	9	10	7	111	10
Nufar Edelman	Laser Radial	~~25~~	12	3	15	25	11	9	19	17	CAN	EL	111	16
Vered Buskila; Nike Kornecki	470	8	13	1	2	8	~~19~~	3	1	11	15	2	66	4

Notes

- M = Medal race. Only the top 10 competitors participated in the final medal race.
- EL = Eliminated – did not advance into the medal race
- BFD = Black Flag Disqualification (under rule 30.3).
- DSQ = Disqualified after a protest
- CAN = Race canceled
- OCS = On the course side of the starting line at the starting signal and failed to start, or broke rule 30.1

== Shooting ==
Three shooters represented Israel in Beijing

Men

Athlete	Event	Qualification		Final	
Athlete	Event	Points	Rank	Points	Rank
Doron Egozi	10 m air rifle	587	41	Did not advance	
Doron Egozi	50 m rifle 3 positions	1155	36	Did not advance	
Gil Simkovich	50 m rifle prone	592	22	Did not advance	
Gil Simkovich	50 m rifle 3 positions	1153	38	Did not advance	
Guy Starik	50 m rifle prone	594	12	Did not advance	

== Swimming ==
Seven swimmers represented Israel in the Olympics.

Men

Athlete	Event	Heat		Semifinal		Final	
Athlete	Event	Time	Rank	Time	Rank	Time	Rank
Nimrod Shapira Bar-Or	100 m freestyle	49.10	26	Did not advance			
Nimrod Shapira Bar-Or	200 m freestyle	1:47.78	15 Q	1:48.16	15	Did not advance	
Guy Barne'a	100 m backstroke	54.50	15 Q	54.93	16	Did not advance	
Tom Be'eri	100 m breaststroke	1:02.42	42	Did not advance			
Tom Be'eri	200 m breaststroke	2:11.44	20	Did not advance			
Itai Chammah	200 m backstroke	2:00.93	26	Did not advance			
Alon Mandel	100 m butterfly	52.99	36	Did not advance			
Alon Mandel	200 m butterfly	1:59.27	28	Did not advance			
Gal Nevo	200 m individual medley	1:59.66	12 Q	2:00.43	13	Did not advance	
Gal Nevo	400 m individual medley	4:14.03	11	—N/a		Did not advance	

Women

Athlete	Event	Heat		Semifinal		Final	
Athlete	Event	Time	Rank	Time	Rank	Time	Rank
Anya Gostomelsky	50 m freestyle	25.23	19	Did not advance			
Anya Gostomelsky	100 m freestyle	55.18	22	Did not advance			
Anya Gostomelsky	100 m backstroke	1:01.87	25	Did not advance			
Anya Gostomelsky	100 m butterfly	59.50	36	Did not advance			

== Synchronized swimming ==
Anastasia Gloushkov and Inna Yoffe represented Israel.

Athlete	Event	Technical routine		Free routine (preliminary)			Free routine (final)		
Athlete	Event	Points	Rank	Points	Total (technical + free)	Rank	Points	Total (technical + free)	Rank
Anastasia Gloushkov; Inna Yoffe	Duet	43.583	15	43.334	86.917	15	Did not advance		

== Taekwondo ==
Bat-El Gatterer competed in Taekwondo.

Athlete	Event	Round of 16	Quarterfinals	Semifinals	Repechage	Bronze Medal	Final	
Athlete	Event	Opposition Result	Opposition Result	Opposition Result	Opposition Result	Opposition Result	Opposition Result	Rank
Bat-El Gatterer	Women's −57 kg	Zubčić (CRO); L 3–4	Did not advance					

== Tennis ==
Jonathan Erlich, Andy Ram, Tzipora Obziler and Shahar Pe'er competed in tennis.

Athlete	Event	Round of 64	Round of 32	Round of 16	Quarterfinals	Semifinals	Final / BM	
Athlete	Event	Opposition Score	Opposition Score	Opposition Score	Opposition Score	Opposition Score	Opposition Score	Rank
Jonathan Erlich; Andy Ram	Men's doubles	—N/a	Clément / Llodra (FRA); L 4–6, 4–6	Did not advance				
Tzipora Obziler	Women's singles	Koryttseva (UKR); L 5–7, 7–5, 4–6	Did not advance					
Shahar Pe'er	Women's singles	Cîrstea (ROU); W 6–3, 5–7, 6–0	Zvonareva (RUS); L 3–6, 6–7^{(4–7)}	Did not advance				
Tzipora Obziler; Shahar Pe'er	Women's doubles	—N/a	Dulko / Jozami (ARG); L 3–6, 2–6	Did not advance				

== See also ==
- Israel at the 2008 Summer Paralympics
