= Benjamin Burge =

Australian sport shooter

Personal information
- Nationality: Australia
- Born: 11 June 1980 (age 46) Albury, New South Wales, Australia
- Height: 1.75 m (5 ft 9 in)
- Weight: 74 kg (163 lb)

Sport
- Sport: Shooting
- Events: 10 m air rifle (AR40); 50 m rifle prone (FR60PR); 50 m rifle 3 positions (STR3X20)
- Club: Frankston Peninsula Target; Rifle Club
- Coached by: Miroslav Sipek
Medal record
Men's shooting
Representing Australia
Commonwealth Games
Silver medal – second place	2006 Melbourne	STR3X20 (pairs)
Bronze medal – third place	2006 Melbourne	STR3X20

Benjamin Burge (born 11 June 1980 in Albury, New South Wales) is an Australian sport shooter. Since 2001, Burge had won a total of seven medals (five silver and two bronze) in both air and small-bore rifle at the Oceania Shooting Championships. He also captured a bronze medal for the men's 50 m rifle three positions at the 2006 Commonwealth Games in Melbourne, accumulating a score of 1,238.2 points.

Burge represented Australia at the 2008 Summer Olympics in Beijing, where he competed for all three rifle shooting events. In his first event, 10 m air rifle, Burge was able to hit a total of 576 points within six attempts, finishing forty-ninth in the qualifying rounds. Few days later, he placed fortieth in the 50 m rifle prone, by two points ahead of Austria's Christian Planer, with a total score of 588 points. In his third and last event, 50 m rifle 3 positions, Burge was able to shoot 392 targets in a prone position, 373 in standing, and 387 in kneeling, for a total score of 1,152 points, finishing again in fortieth place.
