= Alexandra Schneider =

German sport shooter

Alexandra Schneider (born 10 January 1977) is a German sport shooter who competed in the 2000 Summer Olympics.
