= Jason Parker (sport shooter) =

American sports shooter

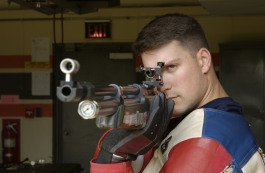
- Parker in 2008

Personal information
- Born: 27 June 1974 (age 52) Omaha, Nebraska, United States

Sport
- Sport: Sport shooting
Medal record
Representing United States
Pan American Games
Gold medal – first place	2003 Santo Domingo	50m rifle 3 positions
Gold medal – first place	2007 Rio de Janeiro	50m rifle 3 positions
Gold medal – first place	2007 Rio de Janeiro	10m air rifle
Gold medal – first place	2011 Guadalajara	50m rifle 3 positions
Bronze medal – third place	2011 Guadalajara	50m rifle prone

Jason Alan Parker (born June 27, 1974) is an American sport shooter, one of the world's leading 10 m Air Rifle shooters, although he has also had some successes in Three positions competitions. He has never won an Olympic medal, but he won the Air Rifle event at the 2002 ISSF World Shooting Championships. He has also held the final world record in this event on several occasions. He lost it to Zhu Qinan of China at the 2004 Olympics, but at an ISSF World Cup competition the following spring he equalled Zhu's 702.7 points, and they shared the world record until October 2006.

In addition to air rifle competition, Jason Parker, who is a SFC in the United States Army, also has participated in rifle shoots at 300m, as in the case of the three position standard rifle slow fire event in Conseil International du Sport Militaire shooting competition in Switzerland in 2008, in which he scored a silver medal.

Jason Parker, a graduate of Xavier University in Cincinnati, Ohio, was a member of Xavier's Rifle team from 1992–1996.

Parker earned seven All-American citations as a member of the Xavier rifle team, the most for any shooter in school history. Parker, who is now a member of the U.S. Army Marksmanship Unit, was an All-American in smallbore rifle shooting as a freshman in 1993, then earned honors for both smallbore and air rifle in his final three seasons.

Parker was a member of the team that placed first in air rifle in the 1996 NCAA Championship. In individual NCAA competition, Parker placed second in smallbore in 1993, and in air rifle he placed third in 1994, fourth in 1995 and fifth in 1996.

On the international level Parker was a member of the 1998 Munich World Cup Air Rifle Championship Team. While there he won a gold medal and set two new world records. Parker scored a world-record 700.6 points to defeat Slovenia's Rajmond Debevec and win his event. Also, Parker's qualifying score of 598 out of 600 points set a new world mark.

Following his performance in Munich, Parker was named 1998 USA Shooting Male Rifle Shooter of the Year and was also featured in Sports Illustrated's "Faces in the Crowd". Parker followed the honor up by winning a gold medal at the 1999 Masters European Air Rifle Championship. The U.S. Olympic Committee named Parker Shooter of the Year in 1999.

Parker also participated in the 2000 Summer Olympics in Sydney. He posted the third best qualifying score in Men's 10 meter air rifle before placing fifth in the finals, falling .7 points short of the bronze medal.

Olympic results
Event	2000	2004	2008	2012
50 metre rifle three positions	—	—	22nd 1164	30th 1159
10 metre air rifle	5th 592+101.1	8th 594+100.5	23rd 591	—
