= Alin Moldoveanu =

Romanian sport shooter (born 1983)

Personal information
- Full name: Alin George Moldoveanu
- Born: 3 May 1983 (age 43) Focșani, Romania
- Height: 1.74 m (5 ft 8 1/2 in)
- Weight: 74 kg (163 lb; 11.7 st)

Sport
- Sport: Shooting
- Club: CS Dinamo București
- Coached by: Marin Olimpiu; Sorin Babii
Medal record
Men's shooting
Representing Romania
Olympic Games
Gold medal – first place	2012 London	10 m Air Rifle
World Championships
Silver medal – second place	2006 Zagreb	10 m Air Rifle
World Cup
Gold medal – first place	2008 Munich	10 m Air Rifle
Silver medal – second place	2005 Milan	10 m Air Rifle
Silver medal – second place	2005 Munich	10 m Air Rifle
Silver medal – second place	2007 Bangkok	10 m Air Rifle
Silver medal – second place	2008 Rio de Janeiro	10 m Air Rifle
European Championships
Bronze medal – third place	2004 Győr	10 m Air Rifle

Alin Moldoveanu (Romanian pronunciation: [aˈlin moldoˈve̯anu]; born 3 May 1983, in Focșani) is a Romanian 10 m Air Rifle sport shooter, Olympic champion at the 2012 Summer Olympics. He also competed in the 2008 Summer Olympics where he ranked fourth.

Moldoveanu won the gold medal in the 10 m Air Rifle in the London Olympics 2012 with a total score of 702.1. In the qualifying round, he scored 599 points, managing to equal the Olympic record set by China’s Zhu Qinan in Athens in 2004.
