= Mohamed Amer (sport shooter) =

Egyptian sport shooter

Personal information
- Full name: Mohamed Mahmoud Amer
- Nationality: Egypt
- Born: 19 January 1969 (age 57)

Sport
- Sport: Shooting
- Event(s): 50 m rifle prone (FR60PR); 50 m rifle 3 positions (STR3X20)

Mohamed Mahmoud Amer (Arabic: محمد محمود عامر; born 19 January 1969) is an Egyptian sport shooter. He is a six-time medalist (two golds, one silver, and three bronze) in men's small-bore rifle prone and three positions at the African Shooting Championships.

At the age of 39, Amer made his official debut for the 2008 Summer Olympics in Beijing, where he competed in the men's 50 m rifle 3 positions. He was able to shoot 390 targets in a prone position, 369 in standing, and 376 in kneeling, for a total score of 1,135 points, finishing only in forty-sixth place.
