= Gil Simkovitch =

Israeli sport shooter

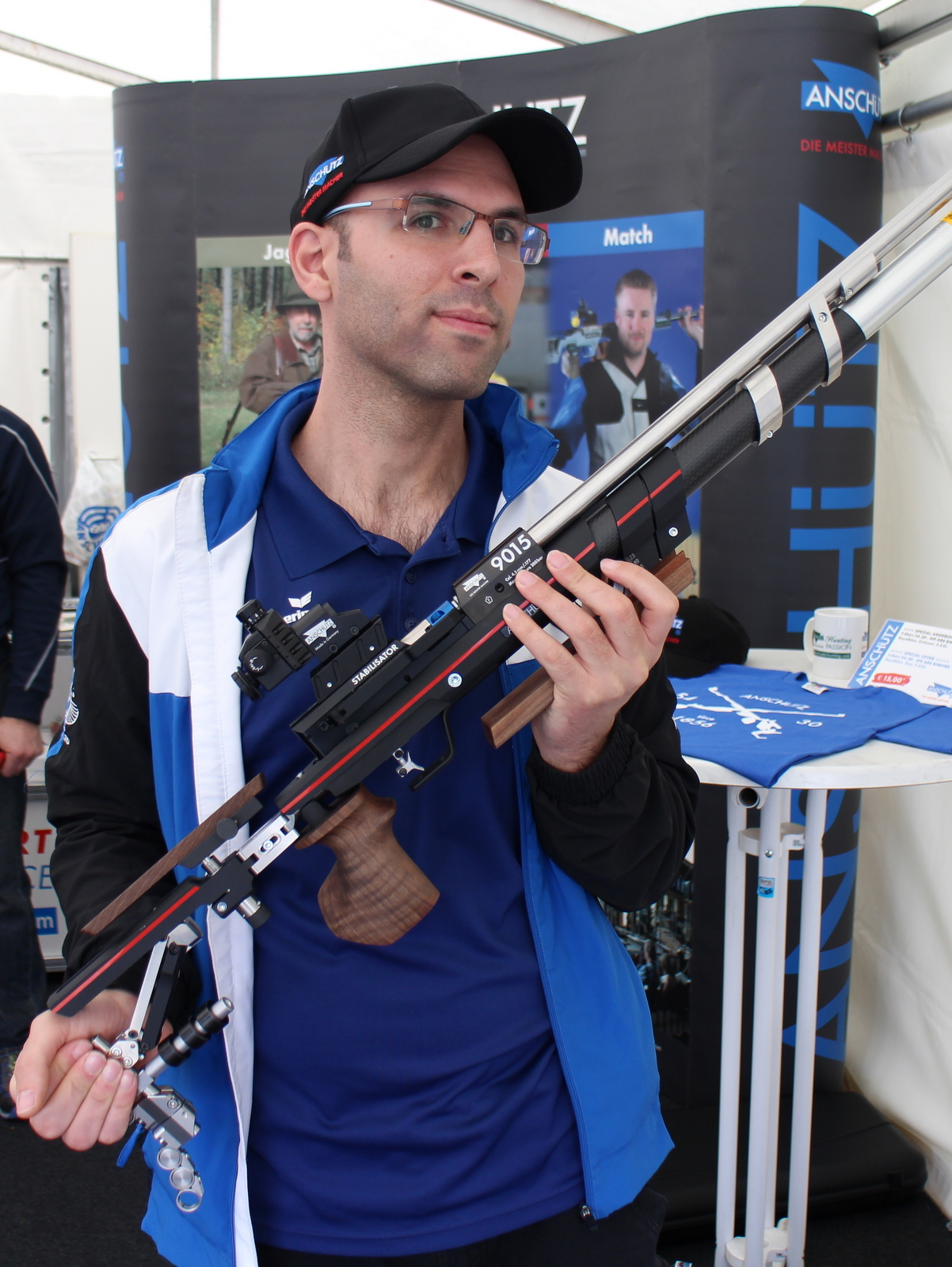
- Simkovitch at the Munich ISSF World Cup 2015

Personal information
- Birth name: גיל סימקוביץ
- Born: January 13, 1982 (age 43)
- Height: 5 ft 10 in (178 cm)
- Weight: 161 lb (73 kg)

Sport
- Country: Israel
- Sport: Sport shooting
- Event(s): 50 metre rifle three positions and 50 metre rifle prone
- Coached by: Guy Starik

Gil Simkovitch (Hebrew: גיל סימקוביץ; born January 13, 1982) is an Israeli Olympic sport shooter.

== Biography ==
Simkovitch is Jewish, and was born in Kfar Saba, Israel. He began shooting when he was 16 years of age, and is coached by Israeli Olympian Guy Starik. He trains at the National Olympic Range in Herzliya.

He won the 60 metre prone event at the World Championships in May 2007.

He competed on behalf of Israel at the 2008 Summer Olympics in Beijing, China, in the Men's 50 metre rifle prone, in which he came in 22nd, and in the Men's 50 metre rifle three positions, in which he came in 38th.
