= Josselin Henry =

French sport shooter (born 1982)

Personal information
- Nationality: France
- Born: 22 April 1982 (age 44) Nancy, France
- Height: 1.80 m (5 ft 11 in)
- Weight: 70 kg (154 lb)

Sport
- Sport: Shooting
- Event(s): 10 m air rifle (AR40); 50 m rifle prone (FR60PR); 50 m rifle 3 positions (STR3X20)
- Club: Ste. Bitche
- Coached by: Roger Chassat
Medal record
Men's shooting
European Shooting Championships
Gold medal – first place	Osijek 2013	300 m rifle prone team
Gold medal – first place	Osijek 2013	300 m rifle 3 pos team
Silver medal – second place	Osijek 2013	300 m rifle 3 positions

Josselin Henry (born 22 April 1982 in Nancy) is a French sport shooter. Henry represented France at the 2008 Summer Olympics in Beijing, where he competed for all three rifle shooting events.

In his first event, 10 m air rifle, Henry was able to hit a total of 587 points within six attempts, finishing fortieth in the qualifying rounds. Few days later, he placed twenty-third in the 50 m rifle prone, by one target behind Israel's Gil Simkovitch from the final attempt, with a total score of 592 points. In his third and last event, 50 m rifle 3 positions, Henry was able to shoot 388 targets in a prone position, 373 in standing, and 390 in kneeling, for a total score of 1,151 points, finishing only in forty-first place.
