= Thomas Farnik =

Austrian sport shooter (born 1967)

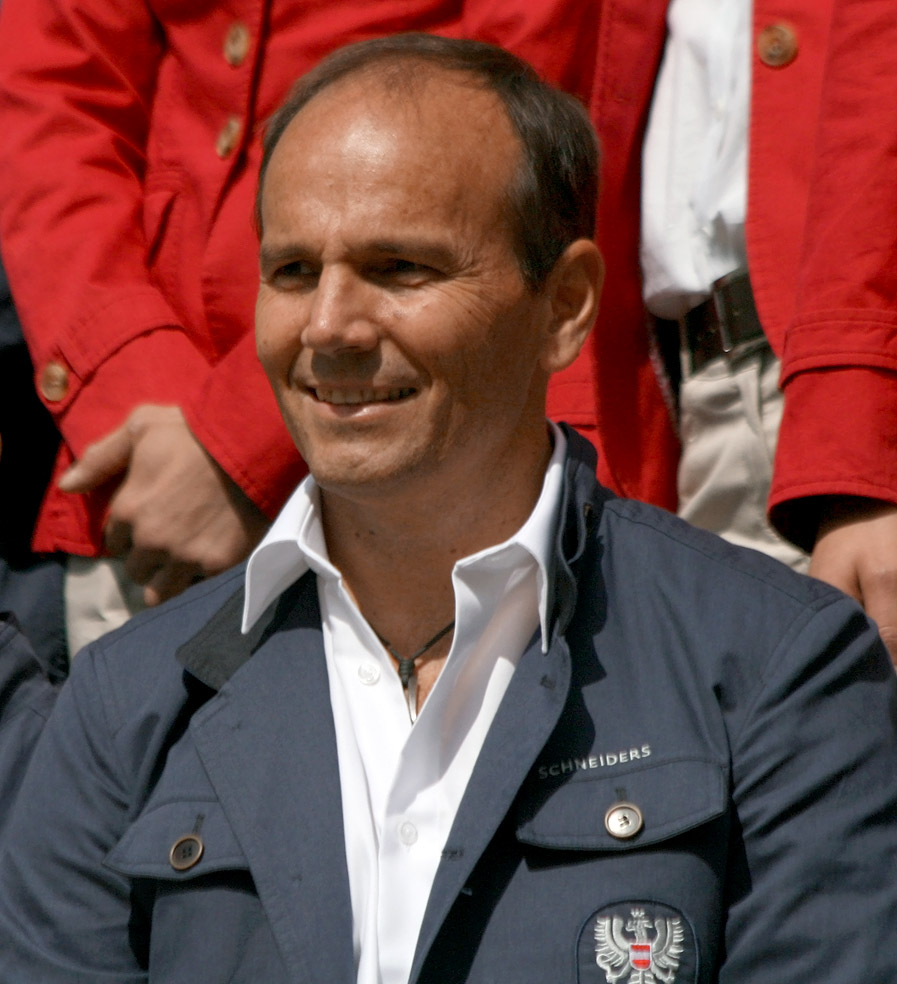
Thomas Farnik in 2012

Thomas Farnik, born 6 January 1967 in Vienna, is an Austrian rifle shooter.

He was twelve years old when his father introduced him to shooting. He started with a rifle, and his father remained involved with his early training.

He competed at six consecutive Olympics from 1992 to 2012. His best position was fifth in the Three Positions at the 2008 Olympics, when he was 2.8 points behind the bronze medal score of 1271.7. He also came sixth in the 10m Air Rifle at the 1992 Barcelona Olympics and the 50m Three Positions at the 2004 Athens Olympics.

He won gold in the 10m Air Rifle at the 2006 ISSF World Cup, setting a world record of 703.1 at the finals in Granada that survived till 2008 (when it was broken by Gagan Narang). He was part of the Austrian team that won bronze in the 10m Air Rifle and silver in the 300m Three Positions at the 2006 World Championships in Zagreb.

He won gold in the 300 metre standard rifle at the 2006 World Championships. He set the current team world record in that event in September 2008 with Florian Kammerlander and Michal Podolak.

At the European Shooting Championships, he won bronze in the 300m Standard Rifle in 2005, silver in the 300m Standard Rifle in 2007, and silver in the 50m Three Positions in 2009. He was part of the Austrian team 10m Air Rifle teams that won gold in 2005 and 2007, silver in 2006 and bronze in 2000 and 2009. He was also part of the 50m Three Positions teams that won gold in 2003 and 2007 and silver in 2009. He was part of the team that won bronze in the 300m Three Positions in 2009.

He is a soldier in the Austrian army. At the World Military Shooting Championship, he came second in the 300m Standard Rifle Three Position in 2005 and third in the same event in 2007. He came fourth in the rapid fire rifle event in 2001.

Farnik was hired as a technical trainer by the Indian Army Marksmanship Unit for their shooters to compete at international meets.

He is a jogger and mountain biker, and sometimes plays tennis and football.

== Olympic results ==
Event	1992	1996	2000	2004	2008	2012
50 metre rifle three positions	14th 1160	13th 1164	12th 1162	6th 1165+96.4	5th 1171+97.9	12th 1167
10 metre air rifle	6th 382+96.5	—	18th 588	12th 593	10th 594	28th 591
10 metre air pistol	42nd 589	44th 585	27th 592	—	—	—

== See also ==
- List of athletes with the most appearances at Olympic Games

== Records ==
Current world records held in 50 metre rifle three positions
Men's	Teams	3549	Norway (Claussen, Larsen, Hegg)	May 29, 2021	Osijek (CRO)
Current world records held in 300 metre standard rifle
Men's (CISM)	Teams	1752	Norway (Lund, Brekne, Bryhn)	31 May 2018	Thun (SUI)
