= Eliécer Pérez =

Cuban sport shooter (born 1972)

Personal information
- Full name: Eliécer Pérez Exposito
- Nationality: Cuba
- Born: 14 October 1972 (age 53)
- Height: 1.78 m (5 ft 10 in)
- Weight: 98 kg (216 lb)

Sport
- Sport: Shooting
- Event(s): 10 m air rifle 50 m rifle prone 50 m rifle 3 positions
Medal record
Men's shooting
Representing Cuba
Pan American Games
Silver medal – second place	2007 Rio de Janeiro	50 m rifle 3 positions

Eliécer Pérez (born October 14, 1972) is a Cuban sport shooter. He won a silver medal for the rifle three positions at the 2007 Pan American Games in Rio de Janeiro, Brazil. At age thirty-four, Perez made his official debut for the 2008 Summer Olympics in Beijing, where he competed for all three rifle shooting events.

In his first event, 10 m air rifle, Perez was able to hit a total of 585 points within six attempts, finishing forty-fourth in the qualifying rounds. Few days later, he placed fifty-second in the 50 m rifle prone, by one target behind Oman's Dadallah Al-Bulushi from the final attempt, with a total score of 582 points. In his third and last event, 50 m rifle 3 positions, Perez was able to shoot 394 targets in a prone position, 373 in standing, and 367 in kneeling, for a total score of 1,134 points, finishing only in forty-seventh place.
