= Tania Haiböck =

Austrian triathlete (born 1978)

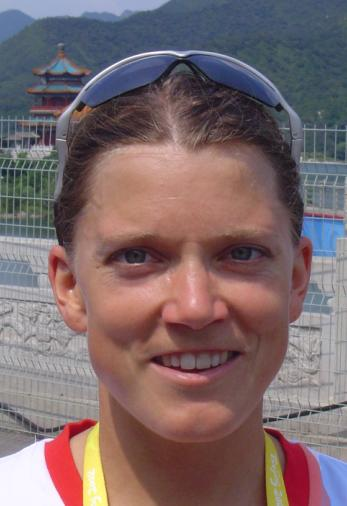
Haiböck at the 2008 Summer Olympics

Tania Haiböck (born 3 March 1978) is an Austrian triathlete who competed in the 2008 Summer Olympics.

In 2008, she finished 27th in the Olympic triathlon event.
