= Niccolò Campriani =

Italian sport shooter (born 1987)

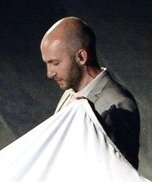
- Niccolò Campriani at the opening ceremony of the first European Games.

Personal information
- Born: November 6, 1987 (age 38) Florence, Italy
- Height: 1.77 m (5 ft 10 in)
- Weight: 74 kg (163 lb)

Sport
- Country: Italy
- Sport: Shooting
- Club: G.S. Fiamme Gialle (2011-2014); C.S. Esercito (2015); G.S. Fiamme Gialle (2016)
- Retired: 2017
Medal record
Event	1st	2nd	3rd
Olympic Games	3	1	0
World Championships	1	0	1
European Championships	3	3	1
European Games	1	1	0
Total	8	5	2
Olympic Games
Gold medal – first place	2016 Rio de Janeiro	10 m air rifle
Gold medal – first place	2016 Rio de Janeiro	50 m rifle 3 positions
Gold medal – first place	2012 London	50 m rifle 3 positions
Silver medal – second place	2012 London	10 m air rifle

Niccolò Campriani (born November 6, 1987) is an Italian sport shooter and shooting coach. He competed at the 2008 Summer Olympics in Beijing in the men's 10 metre air rifle, men's small-bore rifle, three positions, 50 metres and men's small-bore rifle, prone, 50 metres, and at the 2012 Summer Olympics in the men's 10 metre air rifle, winning silver, and in the men's 50 metre rifle three positions, where he won gold with a total of 1278.5 points.

== Biography ==
After participating in the 2008 Summer Olympics, achieving his best result in 12th place in the 10 meter rifle, he won the gold medal at Euro 2009. On July 31, 2010, he won the gold medal at the World Shooting Championships in the 10 meter rifle, qualifying for the 2012 Summer Olympics. This made him the first Italian to become a world champion in shooting. On July 29, 2012, he won the silver medal at the Olympics in the 10 m rifle final. On August 6, 2012, he won a gold medal at the Olympics in the 50 m three position rifle final. He was also the first Italian in the history of shooting to win an individual world title. In the same competition he also won a bronze medal in the team in the same discipline. In 2011 he earned a bronze medal at the European championships. In the 2016 Summer Olympics, Niccolò won the gold medal in the 10 metre air rifle event on 8 August 2016, and, on 14 August 2016, he won his third olympics gold medal in the 50 metre rifle three positions event.

In 2018, Campriani was appointed as the shooting coach of the Italian national biathlon team.

== See also ==
- Italy national shooting team
