= Qiu Jian (sport shooter) =

Chinese sport shooter (born 1975)

Medal record

Men's shooting

Representing China

Olympic Games
Gold medal – first place	2008 Beijing	50 m rifle 3 positions

Asian Championships
Gold medal – first place	2007 Kuwait City	50 m rifle prone team
Gold medal – first place	2007 Kuwait City	50 m rifle 3 positions team

Qiu Jian (Chinese: 邱健; pinyin: Qiū Jiàn; born June 25, 1975, in Huai'an, Jiangsu) is a male Chinese sports shooter who competed for Team China at the 2008 Summer Olympics.

== Major performances ==
- 2000/2003 National Championships - 1st 3x40/air rifle 60;
- 2001 World Cup Final - 1st air rifle 60;
- 2002 Asian Games - 1st 3x40;
- 2006 National Champions Tournament - 1st 3x40

== Records ==
- 1999 National Team Championships - 1770, air rifle (NR);
- 2000 National Team Championships - 1771, air rifle (NR);
- 2003 National Team Championships - 3499, 3x40 (NR);
