= Henri Häkkinen =

Finnish sport shooter

Olympic medal record

Men's shooting

Representing Finland
| Bronze medal – third place | 2008 Beijing | 10 m air rifle |

Henri Häkkinen (born 16 June 1980, in Joensuu) is a Finnish sport shooter.

At the 2008 Summer Olympics Men's 10m air rifle Häkkinen won the bronze medal. He was leading with Abhinav Bindra of India until the final shot. Bindra won gold with a last shot of 10.8, whereas Häkkinen could score only 9.7, thereby settling for a bronze. China's Zhu Qinan got the silver with a final shot of 10.5. Henri Häkkinen's manager is Finnish Sports Management Agency, SportElite.

Häkkinen has a master's degree in military science and he works as an officer at Signals Regiment in Riihimäki. His military rank is Major.

== See also ==
- Shooting at the 2008 Summer Olympics – Men's 10 metre air rifle
