= Vebjørn Berg =

Norwegian sports shooter (born 1980)

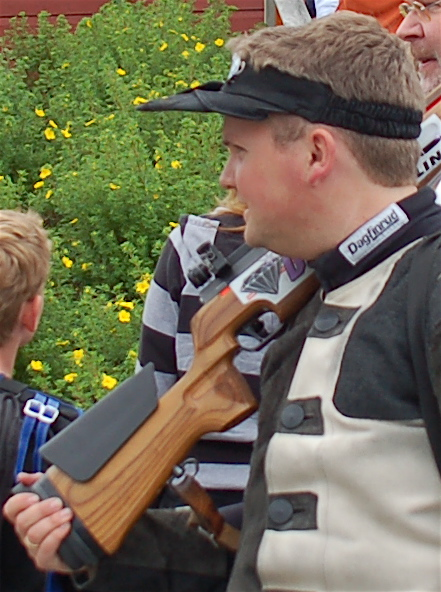
Vebjørn Berg

Vebjørn Berg (born 1 April 1980) is a Norwegian sports shooter. He did well at several ISSF World Cups. He was also on the winning Norwegian team at the 2002 Shooting World Championship. He represented his country at the 2008 Summer Olympics and received fourth at Men's 50 metre rifle prone.

Current world records held in 300 metre rifle prone
Men (ISSF)	Individual	600	Harald Stenvaag (NOR); Bernd Rücker (GER); Josselin Henry (FRA); Vebjørn Berg (NOR); Stefan Raser (AUT); Remi Moreno Flores (FRA); Karl Olsson (SWE)	15 August 1990; 31 July 1994; 5 August 2010; 5 August 2010; 27 July 2015; 23 September 2019; 23 September 2019	Moscow (URS); Tolmezzo (ITA); Munich (GER); Munich (GER); Maribor (SLO); Tolmezzo (ITA); Tolmezzo (ITA)
