= Mario Knögler =

Austrian sports shooter

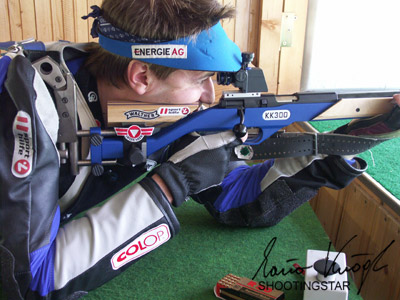

Personal information
- Nationality: Austrian
- Born: 2 July 1979 (age 46) Wels

Sport
- Sport: Shooting

Mario Knögler (born 2 July 1979) is an Austrian sport shooter. He was born in Wels. He competed at the 2000, 2004 and 2008 Summer Olympics.

== Records ==
Current world records held in 50 metre rifle three positions
Men's	Teams	3549	Norway (Claussen, Larsen, Hegg)	May 29, 2021	Osijek (CRO)
