= Václav Haman =

Czech sport shooter (born 1986)

Personal information
- Born: 18 July 1986 (age 39) Jičín, Czechoslovakia

Sport
- Country: Czechoslovakia
- Sport: Sport shooting
- Event(s): AR60; FR3X40; FR60PR
- Club: SKP Rapid Plzeň
- Coached by: Tomáš Jeřábek (personal coach); Luboš Opelka (national coach)

Achievements and titles
- Olympic finals: 2008 Summer Olympics; 2012 Summer Olympics

Václav Haman (Czech pronunciation: [ˈvaːtslav ˈɦaman]; born 18 July 1986) is a Czech sport shooter and professional gunsmith. He competed at the 2008 and 2012 Summer Olympics.
