= Shooting at the 1988 Summer Olympics – Women's 10 metre air pistol =

Sports shooting at the Olympics

Women's 10 metre air pistol at the Games of the XXIV Olympiad
- Date: 21 September 1988
- Competitors: 37 from 26 nations
- Winning score: 489.5 (WR)

Medalists
1st place, gold medalist(s)		Jasna Šekarić	Yugoslavia
2nd place, silver medalist(s)		Nino Salukvadze	Soviet Union
3rd place, bronze medalist(s)		Marina Dobrantcheva	Soviet Union

Women's 10 metre air pistol made its first Olympic appearance at the 1988 Summer Olympics. It was a high-class competition, where Nino Salukvadze, who had won the 25 metre pistol competition two days earlier, set a new world record in the qualification round, with 390 of 400 points. Jasna Šekarić was still able to enter the final only one point behind, and won it to become the first Olympic air pistol champion. Lieselotte Breker, third in the qualification round with 386, started out the final with a 0.0 and was then never in contention for the medals; Marina Dobrantcheva won the bronze medal.

== Qualification round ==
Rank	Athlete	Country	Score	Notes
1	Nino Salukvadze	Soviet Union	390	Q WR OR
2	Jasna Šekarić	Yugoslavia	389	Q
3	Lieselotte Breker	West Germany	386	Q
4	Marina Dobrantcheva	Soviet Union	385	Q
5	Anke Völker	East Germany	383	Q
6	Anne Goffin	Belgium	381	Q
7	Liu Haiying	China	380	Q
8	Christine Strahalm	Austria	379	Q (4th: 99)
9	Cris Kajd	Sweden	379	(4th: 95)
10	Eva Suárez	Spain	379	(4th: 94)
11	Tomoko Hasegawa	Japan	379	(4th: 94)
12	Dorota Bidołach	Poland	378	
12	Evelyne Manchon	France	378	
12	Anişoara Matei	Romania	378	
12	Park Jung-hee	South Korea	378	
16	Kimberly Dyer	United States	377	
16	Anna Gönczi	Hungary	377	
16	Wen Zhifang	China	377	
19	Bang Hyun-joo	South Korea	376	
19	Kerstin Bodin	Sweden	376	
19	Margit Stein	West Germany	376	
22	Hisayo Chikusa	Japan	375	
22	Ruby Fox	United States	375	
22	Agathi Kassoumi	Greece	375	
25	Eszter Poljak	Yugoslavia	373	
25	Valerie Winter	Australia	373	
27	Byambajavyn Altantsetseg	Mongolia	372	
27	Tânia Mara Fassoni-Giansante	Brazil	372	
27	Ágnes Ferencz	Hungary	372	
27	Yvonna Ježová	Czechoslovakia	372	
31	Maria Amaral	Brazil	369	
32	Selvyana Adrian Sofyan	Indonesia	368	
33	Rachel Morin	France	366	
34	Francine Antonietti	Switzerland	365	
34	Margaret Thomas	Great Britain	365	
36	Khatijah Surattee	Singapore	361	
37	Inés Margraff	Ecuador	351	

OR Olympic record – Q Qualified for final – WR World record

== Final ==
Rank	Athlete	Qual	Final	Total	Notes
1st place, gold medalist(s)	Jasna Šekarić (YUG)	389	100.5	489.5	WR OR
2nd place, silver medalist(s)	Nino Salukvadze (URS)	390	97.9	487.9	
3rd place, bronze medalist(s)	Marina Dobrantcheva (URS)	385	100.2	485.2	
4	Anne Goffin (BEL)	381	99.2	480.2	
5	Anke Völker (GDR)	383	96.3	479.3	
6	Liu Haiying (CHN)	380	96.9	476.9	
7	Lieselotte Breker (FRG)	386	90.0	476.0	
8	Christine Strahalm (AUT)	379	93.6	472.6	

OR Olympic record – WR World record

== Sources ==
- XXIVth Olympiad Seoul 1988 Official Report – Volume 2 Part 2 (PDF).
