= Shooting at the 1988 Summer Olympics – Women's 25 metre pistol =

Sports shooting at the Olympics

Women's 25 metre pistol at the Games of the XXIV Olympiad
- Date: 19 September 1988
- Competitors: 35 from 24 nations
- Winning score: 690 (OR)

Medalists
1st place, gold medalist(s)		Nino Salukvadze	Soviet Union
2nd place, silver medalist(s)		Tomoko Hasegawa	Japan
3rd place, bronze medalist(s)		Jasna Šekarić	Yugoslavia

Women's 25 metre pistol (then known as sport pistol) was one of the thirteen shooting events at the 1988 Summer Olympics. It was the second installment of the event, the first to feature final shooting, and the last with the old rapid-fire target. Nino Salukvadze won the competition. Tomoko Hasegawa and Jasna Šekarić finished on the same score, four points behind Salukvadze, and Hasegawa won the silver medal due to higher score in the two-series final.

== Qualification round ==
Rank	Athlete	Country	Prec	Rapid	Total	Notes
1	Jasna Šekarić	Yugoslavia	296	295	591	Q OR
2	Nino Salukvadze	Soviet Union	297	294	591	Q OR
3	Tomoko Hasegawa	Japan	290	297	587	Q
4	Evelyne Manchon	France	289	297	586	Q
5	Kristina Fries	Sweden	292	294	586	Q
6	Lieselotte Breker	West Germany	289	296	585	Q
7	Ágnes Ferencz	Hungary	287	298	585	Q
8	Marina Dobrantcheva	Soviet Union	290	295	585	Q
9	Wen Zhifang	China	290	293	583	
10	Dorota Bidolach	Poland	291	291	582	
11	Margaret Thomas	Great Britain	290	292	582	
12	Britt-Marie Ellis	Sweden	286	295	581	
12	Anne Goffin	Belgium	295	286	581	
12	Yoshiko Ito	Japan	289	292	581	
12	Anetta Kalinowski	West Germany	286	295	581	
12	Anisoara Matei	Romania	289	292	581	
12	Rampai Yamfang-Sriyai	Thailand	289	292	581	
18	Martine Guépin	France	284	296	580	
18	Yvonna Jazova	Czechoslovakia	288	292	580	
18	Eszter Poljak	Yugoslavia	285	295	580	
18	Christine Strahalm	Austria	289	291	580	
22	Maria Amaral	Brazil	287	292	579	
22	Qi Chunxia	China	282	297	579	
24	Kimberly Dyer	United States	289	289	578	
24	Anke Völker	East Germany	284	294	578	
26	Ruby Fox	United States	291	286	577	
27	Boo Sun-hee	South Korea	280	296	576	
28	Anna Gonczi	Hungary	284	291	575	
28	Hong Young-ok	South Korea	280	295	575	
30	Valerie Winter	Australia	284	289	573	
31	Agathi Kassoumi	Greece	286	285	571	
32	Francine Antonietti	Switzerland	285	284	569	
32	Tania Fassoni	Brazil	282	287	569	
32	Eva Suarez	Spain	277	292	569	
35	Selvyana Adrian Sofyan	Indonesia	284	284	568	

OR Olympic record – Q Qualified for final

== Final ==
Rank	Athlete	Qual	1	2	Final	Total	Notes
1st place, gold medalist(s)	Nino Salukvadze (URS)	591	50	49	99	690	OR
2nd place, silver medalist(s)	Tomoko Hasegawa (JPN)	587	49	50	99	686	
3rd place, bronze medalist(s)	Jasna Šekarić (YUG)	591	48	47	95	686	
4	Lieselotte Breker (FRG)	585	50	50	100	685	
5	Ágnes Ferencz (HUN)	585	50	50	100	685	
6	Kristina Fries (SWE)	586	49	50	99	685	
7	Evelyne Manchon (FRA)	586	50	48	98	684	
8	Marina Dobrantcheva (URS)	585	48	49	97	682	

OR Olympic record

== Sources ==
- XXIVth Olympiad Seoul 1988 Official Report – Volume 2 Part 2 (PDF).
