= Shooting at the 1992 Summer Olympics – Women's 10 metre air pistol =

Sports shooting at the Olympics

Women's 10 metre air pistol at the Games of the XXV Olympiad
- Venue: Mollet del Vallès
- Competitors: 47 from 31 nations
- Winning score: 486.4 (OR)

Medalists
| 1st place, gold medalist(s) | | Marina Logvinenko | Unified Team |
| 2nd place, silver medalist(s) | | Jasna Šekarić | Independent Olympic Participants |
| 3rd place, bronze medalist(s) | | Mariya Grozdeva | Bulgaria |

Women's 10 metre air pistol was one of the thirteen shooting events at the 1992 Summer Olympics. It was the first Olympic competition after the introduction of the new target in 1989, and thus two Olympic records were set. The defending champion, Jasna Šekarić, established the first when taking a two-point pre-final lead ahead of Marina Logvinenko. In the final, Logvinenko eliminated the gap and finished on exactly the same score as Šekarić, winning the gold medal by virtue of a higher final score.

== Qualification round ==
| Rank | Athlete | Country | Score | Notes |
|---|---|---|---|---|
| 1 | Jasna Šekarić | Independent Olympic Participants | 389 | Q OR |
| 2 | Marina Logvinenko | Unified Team | 387 | Q |
| 3 | Mariya Grozdeva | Bulgaria | 383 | Q |
| 4 | María Pilar Fernández | Spain | 382 | Q |
| 5 | Cris Kajd | Sweden | 381 | Q |
| 6 | Wang Lina | China | 381 | Q |
| 7 | Mirosława Sagun | Poland | 381 | Q |
| 8 | Daniela Dumitrascu | Romania | 381 | Q |
| 9 | Li Shuanghong | China | 380 | |
| 10 | Nino Salukvadze | Unified Team | 380 | |
| 11 | Mirela Skoko | Croatia | 380 | |
| 12 | Britt-Marie Ellis | Sweden | 378 | |
| 12 | Karen Hansen | Denmark | 378 | |
| 12 | Jana Kubala | Austria | 378 | |
| 15 | Bang Hyun-joo | South Korea | 377 | |
| 15 | Liselotte Breker | Germany | 377 | |
| 15 | Ágnes Ferencz | Hungary | 377 | |
| 15 | Anne Goffin | Belgium | 377 | |
| 15 | Lee Sun-bock | South Korea | 377 | |
| 15 | Margit Stein | Germany | 377 | |
| 21 | Dorjsürengiin Mönkhbayar | Mongolia | 376 | |
| 21 | Inna Rose | Estonia | 376 | |
| 21 | Corine Serra-Tosio | France | 376 | |
| 24 | Altantsetsegiin Byambajav | Mongolia | 375 | |
| 24 | Annamária Gönczi | Hungary | 375 | |
| 24 | Evelyne Manchon | France | 375 | |
| 24 | Tania Perez Ramos | Cuba | 375 | |
| 24 | Constance Petracek | United States | 375 | |
| 24 | Jindřiška Šimková | Czechoslovakia | 375 | |
| 24 | Michela Suppo | Italy | 375 | |
| 31 | Hisayo Chikusa | Japan | 374 | |
| 31 | Sharon Cozzarin | Canada | 374 | |
| 31 | M. E. Suárez García | Spain | 374 | |
| 31 | Margarita Tarradell | Cuba | 374 | |
| 35 | Chen Sheu-shya | Chinese Taipei | 373 | |
| 35 | Tanya Staneva | Bulgaria | 373 | |
| 37 | Elizabeth Callahan | United States | 372 | |
| 37 | Jelena Tripolski | Israel | 372 | |
| 39 | Lynne-Marie Freh | Australia | 371 | |
| 39 | Agathi Kassoumi | Greece | 371 | |
| 39 | Julita Macur | Poland | 371 | |
| 42 | Jocelyn Lees | New Zealand | 369 | |
| 42 | Eszter Poljak | Independent Olympic Participants | 369 | |
| 42 | Sonia Vettenburg | Belgium | 369 | |
| 45 | Abha Dhillan | India | 366 | |
| 45 | Tanja Mara Giansante | Brazil | 366 | |
| 47 | Regina Kodymova | Czechoslovakia | 362 | |

OR Olympic record – Q Qualified for final

== Final ==
| Rank | Athlete | Qual | Final | Total | Notes |
|---|---|---|---|---|---|
| 1st place, gold medalist(s) | Marina Logvinenko (EUN) | 387 | 99.4 | 486.4 | OR |
| 2nd place, silver medalist(s) | Jasna Šekarić (IOP) | 389 | 97.4 | 486.4 | OR |
| 3rd place, bronze medalist(s) | Mariya Grozdeva (BUL) | 383 | 98.6 | 481.6 | |
| 4 | Wang Lina (CHN) | 381 | 98.7 | 479.7 | |
| 5 | Cris Kajd (SWE) | 381 | 97.9 | 478.9 | |
| 6 | María Pilar Fernández (ESP) | 382 | 96.5 | 478.5 | |
| 7 | Daniela Dumitrascu (ROU) | 381 | 97.1 | 478.1 | |
| 8 | Mirosława Sagun (POL) | 381 | 96.8 | 477.8 | |

OR Olympic record

== Sources ==
- Games of the XXV Olympiad Barcelona 1992: The results (PDF).
