= Shooting at the 1992 Summer Olympics – Women's 25 metre pistol =

Sports shooting at the Olympics

Women's 25 metre pistol at the Games of the XXV Olympiad
- Venue: Mollet del Vallès
- Competitors: 41 from 29 nations
- Winning score: 684 (OR)

Medalists
1st place, gold medalist(s)		Marina Logvinenko	Unified Team
2nd place, silver medalist(s)		Li Duihong	China
3rd place, bronze medalist(s)		Dorjsürengiin Mönkhbayar	Mongolia

Women's 25 metre pistol (then called sport pistol) was one of the thirteen shooting events at the 1992 Summer Olympics. It was the first Olympic competition after the introduction of the new rapid fire target in 1989, and thus two Olympic records were set, both by Marina Logvinenko.

== Qualification round ==
Rank	Athlete	Country	Prec	Rapid	Total	Notes
1	Marina Logvinenko	Unified Team	294	293	587	Q OR
2	Li Duihong	China	293	293	586	Q
3	Dorjsürengiin Mönkhbayar	Mongolia	292	292	584	Q
4	Nino Salukvadze	Unified Team	292	291	583	Q
5	Jasna Šekarić	Independent Olympic Participants	295	288	583	Q
6	Lynne-Marie Freh	Australia	289	292	581	Q
7	Julita Macur	Poland	283	295	578	Q
8	Mirela Skoko	Croatia	290	288	578	Q
9	Evelyne Manchon	France	290	287	577	
10	Liselotte Breker	Germany	285	292	577	
11	Agathi Kassoumi	Greece	286	291	577	
12	María Pilar Fernández	Spain	291	285	576	
12	Annamária Gönczi	Hungary	285	291	576	
14	Daniela Dumitrascu	Romania	291	284	575	
14	Jana Kubala	Austria	288	287	575	
14	Enkelejda Shehu	Albania	287	288	575	
14	Jindřiška Šimková	Czechoslovakia	287	288	575	
18	Mariya Grozdeva	Bulgaria	287	287	574	
18	Rampai Sriyai	Thailand	288	286	574	
18	Wang Lina	China	286	288	574	
21	Cris Kajd	Sweden	287	286	573	
21	Regina Kodymová-Jirkalová	Czechoslovakia	285	288	573	
21	Jelena Tripolski	Israel	286	287	573	
24	Margarita Tarradell	Cuba	280	292	572	
24	Roxane Thompson	United States	284	288	572	
26	Ágnes Ferencz	Hungary	285	286	571	
26	Paek Jong-suk	North Korea	285	286	571	
26	Margit Stein	Germany	288	283	571	
29	Bang Hyun-joo	South Korea	282	288	570	
29	Connie Petracek	United States	287	283	570	
29	Diana Jorgova	Bulgaria	291	279	570	
32	Britt-Marie Ellis	Sweden	293	276	569	
33	Altantsetsegiin Byambajav	Mongolia	285	283	568	
33	Corinne Serra Tosio	France	288	280	568	
35	Inna Rose	Estonia	283	284	567	
36	Hisayo Chikusa	Japan	289	276	565	
36	Tania Pérez	Cuba	278	287	565	
38	Tanja Mara Giansante	Brazil	288	275	563	
39	Anne Goffin	Belgium	286	276	562	
40	Michela Suppo	Italy	288	271	559	
41	M. E. Suárez García	Spain	281	276	557	

OR Olympic record – Q Qualified for final

== Final ==
Rank	Athlete	Qual	Final	Total	Shoot-off	Notes
1st place, gold medalist(s)	Marina Logvinenko (EUN)	587	97	684		OR
2nd place, silver medalist(s)	Li Duihong (CHN)	586	94	680		
3rd place, bronze medalist(s)	Dorjsürengiin Mönkhbayar (MGL)	584	95	679		
4	Mirela Skoko (CRO)	578	99	677		
5	Nino Salukvadze (EUN)	583	93	676		
6	Jasna Šekarić (IOP)	583	93	676		
7	Lynne-Marie Freh (AUS)	581	94	675		
8	Julita Macur (POL)	578	96	674		

OR Olympic record

== Sources ==
- Games of the XXV Olympiad Barcelona 1992: The results (PDF).
