= List of 10 metre air pistol records =

This list of 10 metre air pistol records documents the best performances in 10 metre air pistol recognized as records by various official instances since 1 January 1989, when targets were changed and all records reset, and also the progression of the World and Olympic records.

== Men's qualification round ==
The men's qualification round consists of 60 shots, and the maximum possible score is 600.

=== World record progression ===
Since introduction in 1969:

Score	Shooter	Date	Comp	Place
385	H. Mertel (FRG)	1969	ECH	Plzeň, Czechoslovakia
385	Rasskazov (URS)	1969	ECH	Plzeň, Czechoslovakia
387	V. Stolypin (URS)	1971	ECH	Meziboří, Czechoslovakia
392	Grigori Kosych (URS)	1973	ECH	Linz, Austria
393	Harald Vollmar (GDR)	1976	ECH	Paris, France
394	Uwe Potteck (GDR)	1979	ECH	Graz, Austria
60 shots from 1981
582	Vladas Turla (URS)	1981	ECH	Athens, Greece
582	I. Mandov (BUL)	1981	ECH	Athens, Greece
587	Vladas Turla (URS)	1982	ECH	The Hague, Netherlands
590	Vladas Turla (URS)	1982	WCH	Caracas, Venezuela
590	Igor Basinski (URS)	1987	ECH	Bratislava, Czechoslovakia
590	Igor Basinski (URS)	1988	ECH	Stavanger, Norway
590	Erich Buljung (USA)	1988	OG	Seoul, South Korea
New targets from 1989
583	Sorin Babii (ROU)	1989	ECH	Copenhagen, Denmark
590	Sergei Pyzhianov (URS)	1989	WCH	Sarajevo, Yugoslavia
593	Sergei Pyzhianov (URS)	13 October 1989	WCF	Munich, West Germany
594	Jin Jong-oh (KOR)	12 April 2009	WC	Changwon, South Korea

=== Olympic record progression ===
Since introduction in 1988:

Score	Shooter	Games
590	Erich Buljung (USA)	1988 Seoul
New targets from 1989
586	Sorin Babii (ROU)	1992 Barcelona
587	Wang Yifu (CHN)	1996 Atlanta
590	Wang Yifu (CHN)	2000 Sydney
590	Franck Dumoulin (FRA)	2000 Sydney
591	Mikhail Nestruyev (RUS)	2004 Athens

=== Current World, Olympic, continental, regional and national records ===
Score	Nation/record	Shooter	Date	Place	Ref
594	World record	Jin Jong-oh (KOR)	12 April 2009	Changwon, South Korea	
594	Asian record	Jin Jong-oh (KOR)	12 April 2009	Changwon, South Korea	
594	South Korea	Jin Jong-oh	12 April 2009	Changwon, South Korea	
593	European record	Sergei Pyzhianov (URS)	13 October 1989	Munich, West Germany	
592	Germany	Uwe Potteck	8 January 1999	Luxembourg	
592	France	Franck Dumoulin	2002	Chalons-en-Champagne, France	
592	Italy	Roberto Di Donna			
591	Sweden	Ragnar Skanåker	14 January 1990	Luxembourg	
591	Ukraine	Viktor Makarov	13 April 1994	Simferopol, Ukraine	
591	China	Tan Zongliang	15 November 1995	Nanning, China	
591	Japan	Naka Shigekatsu	15 December 1995	Asaka, Japan	
591	Olympic record	Mikhail Nestruyev (RUS)	14 August 2004	Athens, Greece	
591	China (equalled)	Tan Zongliang	12 June 2005	Munich, Germany	
591	Belarus	Yury Dauhapolau	9 November 2007	Brest, Belarus	
591	India	Saurabh Chaudhary	2 January 2025	Delhi, India	
590	Poland	Jerzy Pietrzak	28 January 1993	Munich, Germany	
590	Great Britain	Mick Gault	19 March 2000	Inverclyde, United Kingdom	
590	Poland (equalled)	Wojciech Knapik	17 February 2007	Wrocław, Poland	
590	Brazil	Julio Antonio de Souza e Almeida	21 October 2010	Rio de Janeiro, Brazil	
590	United States	Daryl Szarenski	3 January 2011	Anniston, United States	
589	Iceland	Ásgeir Sigurgeirsson	2 May 2013	Reykjavík, Iceland	
589	Czech Republic	Martin Tenk	16 December 2000	Brno, Czech Republic	
589	Czech Republic (equalled)	Martin Tenk	17 December 2000	Brno, Czech Republic	
589	Switzerland	Martin Flury	22 May 2004	Suhl, Germany	
588	Hungary	Csaba Győrik	13 December 1992	Brno, Czech Republic	
588	Slovakia	Ján Fabo	5 February 2000	The Hague, Netherlands	
588	Hungary (equalled)	Zoltán Papanitz	23 February 2002	Budapest, Hungary	
587	Nordic record	Ragnar Skanåker (SWE)	25 May 1990	Suhl, Germany	
587	Nordic record (equalled)	Ragnar Skanåker (SWE)	5 June 1990	Zürich, Switzerland	
587	Finland	Lauri Lauste	13 December 1998	Turku, Finland	
587	Norway	Vegard Askestad	1998		
587	Norway (equalled)	Ståle Waagbø	2000		
587	Finland (equalled)	Jari Koivu	5 January 2002	Kuortane, Finland	
587	Norway (equalled)	Ole-Harald Aas	2022	Baku, Azerbaijan	
586	Wales	James Miller	2026	Wolverhampton, United Kingdom	
585	Portugal	João Costa	2004		
584	Croatia	Saša Špirelja	1994		
584	Denmark	John Sejr Svendsen	15 January 1995	Haderslev, Denmark	
584	Austria	Giovanni Bossi	1996	Munich, Germany	
584	Slovenia	Robert Kranjc	19 January 1997	Ljubljana, Slovenia	
584	Austria (equalled)	Giovanni Bossi	1997	Salzburg, Austria	
584	Spain	José Antonio Colado Castro	2004	Munich, Germany	
583	Commonwealth record	Samaresh Jung (IND)	2005	Melbourne, Australia	
584	Estonia	Reijo Virolainen	14 March 2009	Pärnu-Jaagupi, Estonia	
584	Estonia (equalled)	Peeter Olesk	29 November 2019	Białystok, Poland	
581	Netherlands	E.J. Brink	1997		
581	New Zealand	Greg Yelavich	1989		
580	Commonwealth Games record	Bengt Sandstrom (AUS)	1990	New Zealand	

== Men's final ==
The final consists of an additional 10 shots, for a total maximum of 109.0 points. Records are ratified for the aggregate (qualification + final) score of maximum 709.0 points.

=== World record progression ===
Since introduction of finals in 1986:

Score	Shooter	Date	Comp	Place
688.6 (589+99.6)	Igor Basinski (URS)	12 September 1986	WCH	Suhl, East Germany
689.7 (589+100.7)	Aleksandr Melentiev (URS)	3 October 1987	WC	Seoul, South Korea
692.3 (590+102.3)	Igor Basinski (URS)	27 February 1988	ECH	Stavanger, Norway
New targets from 1989
686.4 (583+103.4)	Sorin Babii (ROU)	4 March 1989	ECH	Copenhagen, Denmark
690.3 (590+100.3)	Sergei Pyzhianov (URS)	27 April 1989	WCH	Sarajevo, Yugoslavia
695.1 (593+102.1)	Sergei Pyzhianov (URS)	13 October 1989	WCF	Munich, West Germany
20-shot finals starting at zero from 2013
199.2	Leonid Yekimov (RUS)	2 March 2013	ECH	Odense, Denmark
200.8	Hoàng Xuân Vinh (VIE)	6 April 2013	WC	Changwon, South Korea
202.1	Will Brown (USA)	7 May 2013	WC	Fort Benning, United States
202.2	Jin Jong-oh (KOR)	28 May 2013	WC	Munich, Germany
202.3	Pang Wei (CHN)	9 March 2014	ACH	Kuwait City, Kuwait
202.8	Hoàng Xuân Vinh (VIE)	29 March 2014	WC	Fort Benning, United States
206.0	Jin Jong-oh (KOR)	12 April 2015	WC	Changwon, South Korea
24-shot finals from 2017
240.1	Tomoyuki Matsuda (JPN)	28 February 2017	WC	New Delhi, India
241.6	Christian Reitz (GER)	10 March 2017	ECH	Maribor, Slovenia
241.8	Tomoyuki Matsuda (JPN)	26 October 2017	WCF	New Delhi, India
241.8	He Zhengyang (CHN)	10 December 2017	ACH	Wakō, Japan
242.3	Shahzar Rizvi (IND)	3 March 2018	WC	Guadalajara, Mexico
243.6	Oleh Omelchuk (UKR)	25 May 2018	WC	Munich, Germany
245.0	Saurabh Chaudhary (IND)	24 February 2019	WC	New Delhi, India
246.3	Saurabh Chaudhary (IND)	27 May 2019	WC	Munich, Germany
246.5	Kim Song-guk (PRK)	11 November 2019	ACH	Doha, Qatar

=== Olympic record progression ===
Since introduction in 1988:

Score	Shooter	Games
687.9	Tanyu Kiryakov (BUL)	1988 Seoul
687.9	Erich Buljung (USA)	1988 Seoul
New targets from 1989
684.8	Wang Yifu (CHN)	1992 Barcelona
688.9	Franck Dumoulin (FRA)	2000 Sydney
690.0	Wang Yifu (CHN)	2004 Athens

=== Current World, Olympic, continental, regional and national records ===
Score	Nation/record	Qual	Final	Shooter	Date	Place	Ref
695.1	World record	593	102.1	Sergei Pyzhianov (URS)	13 October 1989	Munich, West Germany	
695.1	European record	593	102.1	Sergei Pyzhianov (URS)	13 October 1989	Munich, West Germany	
693.9	Poland	590	103.9	Wojciech Knapik	17 February 2007	Wrocław, Poland	
693.2	Italy						
692.8	Germany	590	102.8	Gernot Eder	1 March 1996	Suhl, Germany	
692.0	China			Han Jijun	23 May 2000	Zhengzhou, China	
691.6	Belarus	591	100.6	Yury Dauhapolau	9 November 2007	Brest, Belarus	
691.2	Asian record	590	101.2	Tan Zongliang (CHN)	15 June 2003	Munich, Germany	
691.1	Ukraine			Viktor Makarov	28 January 2003	Lviv, Ukraine	
690.0	Olympic record	590	100.0	Wang Yifu (CHN)	14 August 2004	Athens, Greece	
689.7	Czech Republic	589	100.7	Martin Tenk	16 December 2000	Brno, Czech Republic	
689.3	Switzerland			Lukas Grunder	8 May 2008	Plzeň, Czech Republic	
689.2	South Korea						
688.9	Brazil			Julio Antonio de Souza e Almeida	30 September 2011	Santiago, Chile	
688.6	Japan	591	97.6	Naka Shigekatsu	15 December 1995	Asaka, Japan	
688.0	United States	586	102.0	John Bickar	17 February 2000		
687.7	Slovakia	588	99.7	Ján Fabo	5 February 2000	The Hague, Netherlands	
687.7	Slovakia (equalled)	587	100.7	Juraj Tužinský	26 January 2008	Munich, Germany	
687.5	Finland			Jari Koivu	5 January 2002	Kuortane, Finland	
686.7	Nordic record	586	100.7	Ragnar Skanåker (SWE)	23 March 1991	Los Angeles, United States	
686.7	Sweden	586	100.7	Ragnar Skanåker	23 March 1991	Los Angeles, United States	
686.7	Iceland	585	101.7	Ásgeir Sigurgeirsson	14 November 2009	Reykjavík, Iceland	
686.1	India	586	100.1	Samaresh Jung	2006	Hungary	
685.8	Austria	584	101.8	Giovanni Bossi	1997	Salzburg, Austria	
685.4	Great Britain	587	98.4	Mick Gault	Mar 2003	Bisley, United Kingdom	
684.7	Norway	585	99.7	Terje Theien	1995		
683.4	Spain			Rafael Sánchez López	2005	Plzeň, Czech Republic	
683.2	Croatia	584	99.2	Saša Špirelja	1996		
682.1	Slovenia			Cvetko Ljubič	12 February 2000	Ljubljana, Slovenia	
681.5	Commonwealth record			Mick Gault (GBR)	1999	New Zealand	
679.9	Commonwealth Games record			Mick Gault (GBR)	1998	Malaysia	
679.5	New Zealand			Greg Yelavich	1991		
679.0	Denmark	578	101.0	Thomas Statager	6 Jan 2006	Sävsjö, Sweden	

== Women's qualification round ==
The women's match consisted of 40 shots, for a maximum possible score of 400 points until January 2018 when it moved to a 60 shot format.

=== World record progression ===
Since introduction in 1969:

Score	Shooter	Date	Comp	Place
379	Nina Stoliarova (URS)	1969	ECH	Paris, France
379	Nina Stoliarova (URS)	1972	ECH	Belgrade, Yugoslavia
384	Zinaida Simonian (URS)	1973	ECH	Linz, Austria
387	Nina Stoliarova (URS)	1974	ECH	Enschede, Netherlands
387	Marina Dobrantcheva (URS)	1985	ECH	Varna, Bulgaria
387	Anke Völker (GDR)	1986	WCH	Suhl, East Germany
391	Jasna Šekarić (YUG)	1988	WCF	Munich, West Germany
New targets from 1989
388	Svetlana Smirnova (URS)	1989	ECH	Copenhagen, Denmark
392	Liselotte Breker (FRG)	1989	WC	Zagreb, Yugoslavia
392	Svetlana Smirnova (RUS)	1993	ECH	Brno, Czech Republic
392	Jasna Šekarić (YUG)	1996	WCF	Näfels, Switzerland
393	Svetlana Smirnova (RUS)	23 May 1998	WC	Munich, Germany
60 shots from 2018
583	Olena Kostevych (UKR)	24 February 2018	ECH	Győr, Hungary
587	Anna Korakaki (GRE)	12 May 2018	WC	Fort Benning, United States
587	Jiang Ranxin (CHN)	25 July 2021	OG	Tokyo, Japan
591	Jiang Ranxin (CHN)	15 October 2022	WCH	Cairo, Egypt

=== Olympic record progression ===
Since introduction in 1988:

Score	Shooter	Games
390	Nino Salukvadze (URS)	1988 Seoul
New targets from 1989
389	Jasna Šekarić (IOP)	1992 Barcelona
390	Marina Logvinenko (RUS)	1996 Atlanta
390	Tao Luna (CHN)	2000 Sydney
391	Natalia Paderina (RUS)	2008 Beijing
60 shots from 2018
587	Jiang Ranxin (CHN)	2020 Tokyo

=== Current World, Olympic, continental, regional and national records ===
Score	Nation/record	Shooter	Date	Place	Ref
591	World record	Jiang Ranxin (CHN)	15 October 2022	Cairo, Egypt	
591	China	Jiang Ranxin (CHN)	15 October 2022	Cairo, Egypt	
590	European record	Zorana Arunovic (SRB)	15 October 2022	Cairo, Egypt	
588	Asian record	Bomi Kim (KOR)	16 November 2022	Daegu, South Korea	
588	United States	Nathalia Tobar (USA)	19 January 2025	Port Clinton, United States	
588	France	Annabelle Pioch (FRA)	2025	Châteauroux, France	
587	Olympic record	Jiang Ranxin (CHN)	25 July 2021	Tokyo, Japan	
582	Germany	Sandra Reitz	30 November 2022	Cairo, Egypt	
578	Switzerland	Heidi Diethelm Gerber	26 January 2019	Munich, Germany	
576	Great Britain	Charlotte Hicks	11 January 2026	Bisley, United Kingdom	

=== Pre-2018 World, Olympic, continental, regional and national records ===
Score	Nation/record	Shooter	Date	Place	Ref
394	Denmark	Anke Todorović	8 February 2001	Aarhus, Denmark	
394	Ukraine	Olena Kostevych	3 October 2003	Lviv, Ukraine	
394	Russia	Svetlana Smirnova	Dec 2005	Izhevsk, Russia	
393	Slovakia	Katarína Kučová	21 November 1993	Spišská Nová Ves, Slovakia	
393	World record	Svetlana Smirnova (RUS)	23 May 1998	Munich, Germany	
393	European record	Svetlana Smirnova (RUS)	23 May 1998	Munich, Germany	
393	Japan	Inada Youko	14 April 2001	Asaka, Japan	
393	China	Sun Qi	7 July 2005	Nanjing, China	
392	Germany	Liselotte Breker	18 May 1989	Zagreb, Yugoslavia	
392	Germany (equalled)	Liselotte Breker	27 March 1993	Dortmund, Germany	
392	Belarus	Julia Sinyak	8 May 1995	Minsk, Belarus	
391	Yugoslavia	Jasna Šekarić	1990		
391	Poland	Mirosława Sagun	10 January 1997	Luxembourg	
391	Asian record	Tao Luna (CHN)	3 December 2006	Doha, Qatar	
391	Olympic record	Natalia Paderina (RUS)	10 August 2008	Beijing, China	
390	Spain	Eva Suarez Garcia	1989	Barcelona, Spain	
390	Czech Republic	Lenka Marušková-Hyková	5 December 2004	Plzeň, Czech Republic	
390	United States	Rebecca Snyder	13 June 2006	Fort Benning, United States	
389	Finland	Mira Nevansuu	30 April 2006	Estonia	
389	India	Harveen Srao	2006	Munich, Germany	
388	Sweden	Cris Kajd	10 November 1991	Eskilstuna, Sweden	
388	Sweden (equalled)	Monica Rundqvist	29 April 2000	Borås, Sweden	
388	Switzerland	Angela Schuler	7 November 2003	Gothenburg, Sweden	
388	Italy				
387	Nordic record	Susanne Meyerhoff (DEN)	27 June 1996	Vingsted, Denmark	
387	Great Britain	J. Lydall	Aug 2005	Bisley, United Kingdom	
386	Norway	Ann Kristin Tegle Larsen	2004		
385	Austria	Jana Kubala	1991	Munich, Germany	
385	Slovenia	Irena Toroš	22 March 1999	Ljubljana, Slovenia	
384	Portugal	Joana Sofia Paiva Castelão	2006		
379	Wales	Coral Kennerley	2011	Bisley, United Kingdom	

== Women's final ==
The final consists of an additional 10 shots, for a total maximum of 109.0 points. Records are ratified for the aggregate (qualification + final) score of maximum 509.0 points.

=== World record progression ===
Since introduction of finals in 1986:

Score	Shooter	Date	Comp	Place
485.5	Anke Völker (GDR)	1986	WCH	Suhl, East Germany
489.0	Jasna Brajković (YUG)	1987	WCH	Budapest, Hungary
489.5	Jasna Šekarić (YUG)	1988	OG	Seoul, South Korea
New targets from 1989
488.8	Svetlana Smirnova (URS)	1989	ECH	Copenhagen, Denmark
492.4	Liselotte Breker (FRG)	1989	WC	Zagreb, Yugoslavia
492.7	Jasna Šekarić (YUG)	1996	WCF	Näfels, Switzerland
493.0	Svetlana Smirnova (RUS)	23 May 1998	WC	Munich, Germany
493.5	Ren Jie (CHN)	22 May 1999	WC	Munich, Germany

=== Olympic record progression ===
Since introduction in 1988:

Score	Shooter	Games
489.5	Jasna Šekarić (YUG)	1988 Seoul
New targets from 1989
486.4	Marina Logvinenko (EUN)	1992 Barcelona
486.4	Jasna Šekarić (IOP)	1992 Barcelona
490.1	Olga Klochneva (RUS)	1996 Atlanta
492.3	Guo Wenjun (CHN)	2008 Beijing

== Legend ==
- ECH = European Championships
- OG = Olympic Games
- WC = ISSF World Cup
- WCF = ISSF World Cup Final
- WCH = ISSF World Shooting Championships

== See also ==
- List of Olympic medalists in shooting
- ISSF Olympic skeet
- ISSF Olympic trap
