= Shooting at the 1996 Summer Olympics – Women's 25 metre pistol =

Sports shooting at the Olympics

Women's 25 metre pistol at the Games of the XXVI Olympiad
- Venue: Wolf Creek Shooting Complex
- Date: 26 July 1996
- Competitors: 37 from 24 nations
- Winning score: 687.9 (OR)

Medalists
1st place, gold medalist(s)		Li Duihong	China
2nd place, silver medalist(s)		Diana Iorgova	Bulgaria
3rd place, bronze medalist(s)		Marina Logvinenko	Russia

Women's 25 metre pistol (then called sport pistol) was one of the fifteen shooting events at the 1996 Summer Olympics. Li Duihong won the competition and set two new Olympic records.

== Qualification round ==
Rank	Athlete	Country	Prec	Rapid	Total	Notes
1	Li Duihong	China	296	293	589	Q OR
2	Nino Salukvadze	Georgia	295	291	586	Q
3	Diana Iorgova	Bulgaria	292	293	585	Q
4	Marina Logvinenko	Russia	293	290	583	Q
5	Boo Soon-hee	South Korea	290	293	583	Q
6	Julita Macur	Poland	289	291	580	Q
7	Otryadyn Gündegmaa	Mongolia	289	291	580	Q
8	Jasna Šekarić	FR Yugoslavia	291	289	580	Q
9	Yuliya Bondareva	Kazakhstan	289	289	578	
9	Maria Pilar Fernandez	Spain	285	293	578	
9	Ma Ge	China	286	292	578	
9	Connie Petracek	United States	288	290	578	
9	Yulia Sinyak	Belarus	285	293	578	
14	Zhanna Shitsik	Belarus	287	290	577	
15	Irada Ashumova	Azerbaijan	290	286	576	
15	Dorjsürengiin Mönkhbayar	Mongolia	285	291	576	
15	Agathi Kassoumi	Greece	288	288	576	
15	Enkelejda Shehu	Albania	288	288	576	
15	Svetlana Smirnova	Russia	285	291	576	
20	Djana Mata	Albania	286	289	575	
21	Mariya Grozdeva	Bulgaria	287	287	574	
21	Park Jung-hee	South Korea	288	286	574	
23	Libby Callahan	United States	284	289	573	
23	Barbara Stizzoli	Italy	284	289	573	
23	Anke Völker	Germany	293	280	573	
23	Annette Woodward	Australia	284	289	573	
27	Regina Jirkalova	Czech Republic	281	291	571	
27	Nino Uchadze	Georgia	281	291	571	
29	Lorena Guado	Argentina	280	289	569	
30	Galina Belyayeva	Kazakhstan	286	281	567	
30	Carol Page	Great Britain	285	282	567	
30	Michela Suppo	Italy	286	281	567	
33	Cristina Gallo	Argentina	283	282	565	
34	Susanne Meyerhoff	Denmark	284	280	564	
35	Yoko Inada	Japan	287	276	563	
36	Mirela Skoko	Croatia	289	272	561	
37	Carol Tomcala	Australia	279	279	558	

OR Olympic record – Q Qualified for final

== Final ==
Rank	Athlete	Qual	Final	Total	Notes
1st place, gold medalist(s)	Li Duihong (CHN)	589	98.9	687.9	OR
2nd place, silver medalist(s)	Diana Iorgova (BUL)	585	99.8	684.8	
3rd place, bronze medalist(s)	Marina Logvinenko (RUS)	583	101.2	684.2	
4	Boo Soon-hee (KOR)	583	100.9	683.9	
5	Otryadyn Gündegmaa (MGL)	580	101.3	681.3	
6	Jasna Šekarić (YUG)	580	100.4	680.4	
7	Nino Salukvadze (GEO)	586	91.6	677.6	
8	Julita Macur (POL)	580	97.4	677.4	

OR Olympic record

== Sources ==
- Olympic Report Atlanta 1996 Volume III: The Competition Results (PDF).
