= Jasna Šekarić =

Serbian sport shooter (born 1965)

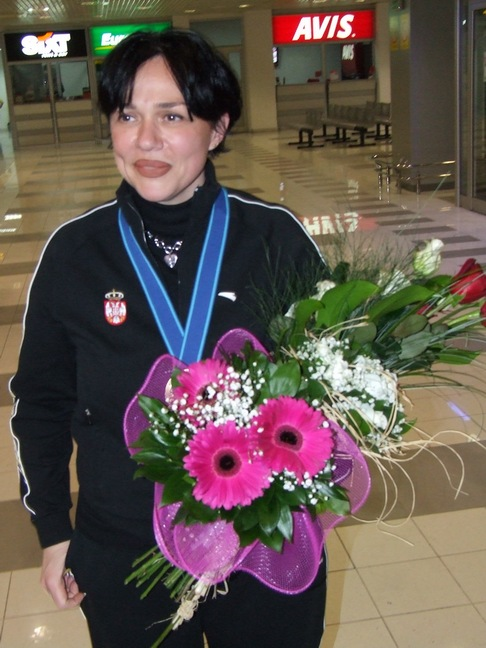
- Šekarić in 2010

Personal information
- Nationality: Serbian
- Born: 17 December 1965 (age 60) Belgrade, SR Serbia, SFR Yugoslavia
- Height: 1.75 m (5 ft 9 in)
- Weight: 68 kg (150 lb)

Sport
- Country: Yugoslavia (1985–1991); Independent Olympic Participants (1992); FR Yugoslavia/Serbia and Montenegro (1993–2006); Serbia (2006–)
- Sport: Shooting
- Event(s): Air pistol Rapid fire pistol
Medal record
Olympic Games
Gold medal – first place	1988 Seoul	10 m Air Pistol
Silver medal – second place	1992 Barcelona	10 m Air Pistol
Silver medal – second place	2000 Sydney	10 m Air Pistol
Silver medal – second place	2004 Athens	10 m Air Pistol
Bronze medal – third place	1988 Seoul	25 m Pistol
World Championships
Gold medal – first place	1987 Budapest	10 m Air pistol
Gold medal – first place	1990 Moscow	10 m Air pistol
Gold medal – first place	1994 Milan	10 m Air pistol
Gold medal – first place	2014 Granada	10m air pistol team
Silver medal – second place	1989 Sarajevo	10 m Air pistol
European Championships
Gold medal – first place	1986 Espoo	10 m Air pistol
Gold medal – first place	1991 Manchester	10 m Air pistol
Gold medal – first place	1992 Budapest	10 m Air pistol
Gold medal – first place	1996 Budapest	10 m Air pistol
Gold medal – first place	2005 Belgrade	25 m Pistol
Silver medal – second place	1989 Copenhagen	10 m Air pistol
Silver medal – second place	1989 Zagreb	25 m Pistol
Silver medal – second place	1990 Arnhem	10 m Air pistol
Bronze medal – third place	1994 Strasbourg	10 m Air pistol
Bronze medal – third place	1999 Arnhem	10 m Air pistol
Bronze medal – third place	2001 Zagreb	25 m Pistol
Mediterranean Games
Gold medal – first place	1991 Athens	25 m Pistol
Gold medal – first place	1991 Athens	10 m Air pistol
Gold medal – first place	1997 Bari	25 m Pistol
Gold medal – first place	2005 Almería	25 m Pistol
Silver medal – second place	2009 Pescara	25 m Pistol
Bronze medal – third place	1997 Bari	10 m Air pistol
Bronze medal – third place	2009 Pescara	10 m Air Pistol
Bronze medal – third place	2013 Mersin	25 m Pistol

Jasna Šekarić (Serbian Cyrillic: Јасна Шекарић; born 17 December 1965) is a Serbian sport shooter. She is one of the most successful female shooters in ISSF history, having won a total of five Olympic medals: one gold, three silver, and one bronze. Šekarić has won three World Championship gold medals in the 10 m air pistol. in addition to five European Championship gold medals, she won in the 10 m air pistol and 25 m pistol. In 1992, Šekarić lost the Olympic gold medal to Marina Logvinenko despite having the same score. She is one of only six shooters (by 2012) to compete in at least seven Olympic Games.

== Early life ==
Šekarić was born in Belgrade, SR Serbia, SFR Yugoslavia – and grew up in Osijek, SR Croatia, then part of Yugoslavia – where she began to practice shooting. In the school competitions, Šekarić first competed with a rifle and achieved a decent place at the regional championships. She later began to use a pistol. In 1990, Šekarić moved to Belgrade, where she had a successful year in sports at a private level. She is divorced and has two children, Lea and Luka.

== Career ==
Šekarić was named the best sportswoman and shooter in the SFR Yugoslavia, Croatia, FR Yugoslavia, Serbia and Montenegro, and Serbia. In 1988 and 1994, she received a Golden Badge of the JSL Sport award for Yugoslavia's best athlete. Despite having never changed nationality, Šekarić has competed under four flags at her six Olympics. She competed for Yugoslavia at the 1988 Olympics. In 1992, since Yugoslavia was under UN sanctions, Šekarić – along with fifty other Serbians, Montenegrins, and Macedonians – competed as Independent Olympic Participants. Her next two Olympics were under the flag of the Federal Republic of Yugoslavia. In 2004, she competed representing Serbia and Montenegro, which had the same flag as FR Yugoslavia, and she finally competed for Serbia in 2008.

== Olympic results ==
Event	1988	1992	1996	2000	2004	2008	2012
25 meter pistol	(bronze) Bronze; 591+95	6th 583+93	6th 580+100.4	17th 577	9th 579	21st 578	18th 579
10 meter air pistol	(gold) Gold; 389+100.5	(silver) Silver; 389+97.4	4th 384+103.1	(silver) Silver; 388+98.5	(silver) Silver; 387+96.3	6th 384+96.9	—

== See also ==
- List of athletes with the most appearances at Olympic Games
- List of flag bearers for Serbia at the Olympics
- 2008 Summer Olympics national flag bearers

Records
Preceded by (East Germany) Anke Schumann (Soviet Union) Svetlana Smirnova	Women's 10m air pistol final world record holder 1987 – 1989; 1996 – 1998	Succeeded by (West Germany) Lieselotte Breker (Russia) Svetlana Smirnova
Awards
Preceded by Mateja Svet; Igor Miladinović	The Best Athlete of Yugoslavia; 1988 (Socialist Federal Republic of Yugoslavia); 1994 (Federal Republic of Yugoslavia)	Succeeded by Dragomir Bečanović; Aleksandar Đorđević
Preceded by Mateja Svet	Yugoslav Sportswoman of the Year; 1988	Succeeded by Mateja Svet
Preceded by Biserka Perman	Croatian Sportswoman of the Year; 1986–1989	Succeeded by Biljana Petrović
Olympic Games
Preceded by Dejan Bodiroga (for Serbia and Montenegro)	Flagbearer for Serbia; 2008 Beijing	Succeeded by Novak Djokovic
