= Shooting at the 2000 Summer Olympics – Women's 25 metre pistol =

Sports shooting at the Olympics

Women's 25 metre pistol at the Games of the XXVII Olympiad
- Venue: Sydney International Shooting Centre
- Date: 22 September 2000
- Competitors: 42 from 28 nations
- Winning score: 690.3 (OR)

Medalists
1st place, gold medalist(s)		Mariya Grozdeva	Bulgaria
2nd place, silver medalist(s)		Tao Luna	China
3rd place, bronze medalist(s)		Lalita Yauhleuskaya	Belarus

Both stages of the women's 25 metre pistol competition at the 2000 Summer Olympics were held on 22 September, and the final was fired at 14:00 Australian Eastern Standard Time (UTC+10). After having lost only one point in the precision stage, Tao Luna set a new Olympic record of 590 points in the qualification round, but lost the final to Mariya Grozdeva, who won on a new Olympic final record of 690.3.

== Records ==
Prior to this competition, the existing World and Olympic records were as follows.

Qualification records
World record	Diana Iorgova (BUL)	594	Milan, Italy	31 May 1994
Olympic record	?	?	?	?

Final records
World record	Diana Iorgova (BUL)	696.2 (594+102.2)	Milan, Italy	31 May 1994
Olympic record	Li Duihong (CHN)	687.9	Atlanta, United States	26 July 1996

== Qualification round ==
Rank	Athlete	Country	Prec	Rapid	Total	Notes
1	Tao Luna	China	299	291	590	Q OR
2	Mariya Grozdeva	Bulgaria	293	296	589	Q
3	Michiko Fukushima	Japan	290	295	585	Q
4	Yulia Sinyak	Belarus	292	292	584	Q
5	Lalita Yauhleuskaya	Belarus	291	292	583	Q
6	Cai Yeqing	China	292	290	582	Q
7	Yoko Inada	Japan	294	287	581	Q
8	Otryadyn Gündegmaa	Mongolia	288	293	581	Q
9	Marina Logvinenko	Russia	287	293	580	
9	Rebecca Snyder	United States	293	287	580	
11	Yuliya Bondareva	Kazakhstan	286	293	579	
11	Djana Mata	Albania	289	290	579	
11	Linda Ryan	Australia	290	289	579	
11	Nino Salukvadze	Georgia	290	289	579	
15	Olga Kuznetsova	Russia	291	287	578	
15	Christine Trefry	Australia	288	290	578	
17	Jasna Šekarić	FR Yugoslavia	286	291	577	
18	Carmen Meininger	Germany	284	292	576	
18	Song Ji-yeong	South Korea	294	282	576	
20	Cao Ying	China	280	295	575	
20	Maria Pilar Fernandez	Spain	291	284	575	
20	Agathi Kassoumi	Greece	285	290	575	
20	Margarita Tarradell	Cuba	283	292	575	
24	Janine Bowman	United States	291	283	574	
25	Boo Soon-hee	South Korea	286	287	573	
25	Ayşe Kil	Turkey	283	290	573	
25	Dorjsürengiin Mönkhbayar	Mongolia	279	294	573	
28	Dina Aspandiyarova	Kazakhstan	289	283	572	
28	Karen Hansen	Denmark	291	281	572	
28	Diana Iorgova	Bulgaria	282	290	572	
31	Irada Ashumova	Azerbaijan	285	284	569	
32	Adriana Rendón	Colombia	282	286	568	
33	Monica Rundqvist	Sweden	291	276	567	
33	Nino Uchadze	Georgia	282	285	567	
35	Kim Eagles	Canada	280	286	566	
36	Irina Maharani	Malaysia	280	284	564	
37	Tania Corrigan	New Zealand	280	283	563	
37	María Gabriela Franco	Venezuela	278	285	563	
39	Susanne Meyerhoff	Denmark	289	273	562	
39	Anke Schumann	Germany	285	277	562	
41	Luisa Maida	El Salvador	278	279	557	
42	Ruwani Abeymanne	Sri Lanka	284	269	553	

OR Olympic record – Q Qualified for final

== Final ==
The final consisted of ten precision shots, with a time limit of 75 seconds per shot.

Rank	Athlete	Qual	Final	Total	Notes
1st place, gold medalist(s)	Mariya Grozdeva (BUL)	589	101.3	690.3	OR
2nd place, silver medalist(s)	Tao Luna (CHN)	590	99.8	689.8	
3rd place, bronze medalist(s)	Lalita Yauhleuskaya (BLR)	583	103.0	686.0	
4	Yulia Siniak (BLR)	584	101.9	685.9	
5	Michiko Fukushima (JPN)	585	99.8	684.8	
6	Otryadyn Gündegmaa (MGL)	581	99.9	680.9	
7	Yoko Inada (JPN)	581	98.6	679.6	
8	Cai Yeqing (CHN)	582	96.8	678.8	

OR Olympic record

== Sources ==
- Official Report of the XXVII Olympiad — Shooting (PDF).
