= Mirela Skoko-Ćelić =

Croatian sports shooter (born 1964)

Personal information
- Full name: Mirela Skoko-Ćelić
- Nationality: Croatia
- Born: 24 June 1964 (age 62) Bapska, SR Croatia, SFR Yugoslavia
- Height: 1.60 m (5 ft 3 in)
- Weight: 54 kg (119 lb)

Sport
- Sport: Shooting
- Events: 10 m air pistol (AP40); 25 m pistol (SP)
- Club: SC Osijek 1874
- Coached by: Zvonimir Kovačević
Medal record
Women's shooting
Representing Croatia
European Championships
Silver medal – second place	2002 Thessaloniki	AP40

Mirela Skoko-Ćelić (born 24 June 1964) is a Croatian sport shooter. She has competed for Croatia in pistol shooting at three Olympics (1992, 1996, and 2004), and has been close to an Olympic medal in 1992 (finishing fourth in the sport pistol). Outside her Olympic career, Skoko-Celic has produced a career tally of five medals in a major international competition, a total of three (one silver and three bronze) at numerous meets of the ISSF World Cup series and a silver in the air pistol at the 2002 European Championships.

== Career ==
Having pursued the sport since the age of eighteen, Skoko-Celic has been training throughout her shooting career under coach and her eventual husband Zvonimir Kovačević at SC Osijek 1874.

Skoko-Celic competed internationally for the former SFR Yugoslavia at the age of twenty-one, and eventually got off to a brilliant career start with a bronze medal each at the ISSF World Cup series in 1986 and in 1991. Following the breakup of Yugoslavia one year later, Skoko-Celic, along with her sister Suzana, made her first ever Olympic team under the independent nation Croatia at the 1992 Summer Olympics in Barcelona. From there, she finished eleventh in the air pistol with 380, and then launched a near-perfect 99 in the sport pistol final to chase 1988 Olympic champions Nino Salukvadze of the Unified Team (now representing Georgia) and her fellow former Yugoslav markswoman Jasna Šekarić for fourth place with 677, narrowly missing out a chance for her (and Croatia's) first Olympic medal by two points.

In 1993, Skoko-Celic reached the peak of her career by capturing her first silver medal in air pistol shooting at the ISSF World Cup meet in Munich, Germany, firing a total score of 484.3 points, a stark improvement from her remarkable fourth-place effort at the Olympics.

On her second Olympic appearance in Atlanta 1996, Skoko-Celic came up with a steady aim at 381 points to force a four-way tie for the tenth position in the air pistol, and had rapidly slipped down the leaderboard through a terrible rapid-fire stage feat to a distant thirty-sixth place in the sport pistol field, finishing with a total score of 561.

Despite missing out the 2000 Olympic bid, Skoko-Celic came back with a vengeance for her third Games by firing a fifth-place score of 482.1 in air pistol shooting at the 2002 ISSF World Championships in Lahti, Finland. She also won a silver medal at the European Championships in Thessaloniki, Greece, finishing with a total of 481.6.

At the 2004 Summer Olympics in Athens, Skoko-Celic qualified as a lone shooter for her third Croatian squad in both air and sport pistol. She managed to get a minimum qualifying score of 384 on her former event to gain an Olympic quota place for Croatia in shooting, following a fifth-place finish at the Worlds two years earlier. Coming to the Games as fifth in the world ranking, Skoko-Celic fired a frustrating 381 out of a possible 400 to take the fifteenth position in the 10 m air pistol, just three points away from her pre-Olympic qualifying standard. Two days later, in the 25 m pistol, Skoko-Celic gave herself a chance for an Olympic final by shooting 289 in the precision stage and 280 in rapid-fire for a total tally of 569 points, ending the Games in a two-way tie with Olympic bronze medalist Olena Kostevych of Ukraine for twenty-seventh place.

== Olympic results ==
Event	1992	1996	2004
25 metre pistol	4th 578+99	36th 561	27th 569
10 metre air pistol	11th 380	10th 381	15th 381
