= Michiko Fukushima =

Japanese sports shooter

Personal information
- Full name: Michiko Hasegawa-Fukushima
- Nationality: Japan
- Born: Tomoko Hasegawa; 23 August 1963 (age 62) Kumaishi, Hokkaidō, Japan
- Height: 1.64 m (5 ft 4 1/2 in)
- Weight: 50 kg (110 lb)

Sport
- Sport: Shooting
- Event(s): 10 m air pistol (AP40); 25 m pistol (SP)
- Club: Kunitomo Gunsmith
Medal record
Women's shooting
Representing Japan
Olympic Games
Silver medal – second place	1988 Seoul	SP
Asian Games
Gold medal – first place	1986 Seoul	AP40
Gold medal – first place	1986 Seoul	AP40 Team
Silver medal – second place	1986 Seoul	SP
Silver medal – second place	1986 Seoul	SP Team
Silver medal – second place	2002 Busan	SP Team
Silver medal – second place	2006 Doha	SP Team

Michiko Hasegawa-Fukushima (長谷川-福島 實智子, Hasegawa-Fukushima Michiko; born 23 August 1963 in Kumaishi, Hokkaidō) is a Japanese sport shooter. Fukushima had won a total of nine medals (four golds, three silver, and two bronze) for both air and sport pistol at the ISSF World Cup series. She also captured two medals (silver and bronze) in the same events at the 1986 Asian Games in Seoul, South Korea.

Fukushima emerged as one of Japan's most prominent shooters in its Olympic history. She won the silver medal in the women's 25 metre pistol at the 1988 Summer Olympics in Seoul by four points behind winner Nino Salukvadze of the Soviet Union (now representing Georgia), with a total score of 686 targets (587 in the preliminary rounds and 99 in the final). Twelve years later, Fukushima achieved a fifth-place finish each in the air and sport pistol at the 2000 Summer Olympics in Beijing, accumulating scores of 483.7 and 684.8 points, respectively. She also competed at the 2004 Summer Olympics in Athens, but she neither reached the final round, nor claimed an Olympic medal.

Twenty years after competing in her first Olympics, Fukushima qualified for her fourth Japanese team, as a 44-year-old, at the 2008 Summer Olympics in Beijing, by placing second in the sport pistol from the ISSF World Cup series in Sydney, Australia, with a record-breaking score of 785.7 points. She placed thirty-eighth out of forty-four shooters in the women's 10 m air pistol by two points behind United States' Brenda Shinn from the final attempt, with a total score of 373 targets. Three days later, Fukushima competed for her second event, 25 m pistol, where she was able to shoot 288 targets in the precision stage, and 293 in the rapid fire, for a total score of 581 points, finishing only in tenth place.

== Olympic results ==
Event	1988	2000	2004	2008
25 metre pistol	(silver) Silver; 587+99	5th 585+99.8	13th 577	10th 581
10 metre air pistol	11th 379	5th 383+100.7	25th 378	38th 373
