= María Pilar Fernández =

Spanish sport shooter (born 1962)

Maria Pilar Fernandez
Personal information
- Full name: María del Pilar Fernández Julián
- Nationality: Spain
- Born: 28 December 1962 (age 63) Madrid, Spain
- Height: 1.80 m (5 ft 11 in)
- Weight: 75 kg (165 lb)

Sport
- Sport: Shooting
- Events: 10 m air pistol (AP40); 25 m pistol (SP)
- Club: Alcorcon Olympic Shooting; Club
- Coached by: Cezary Staniszewski

María del Pilar Fernández Julián (born December 28, 1962, in Madrid) is a Spanish sport shooter. Fernandez had won a total of nine medals (one gold, four silver and four bronze) in both air and sport pistol at the ISSF World Cup series.

Fernandez made her official debut for the 1992 Summer Olympics in Barcelona, representing the host nation Spain. She achieved a sixth-place finish in the 10 m air pistol, and twelfth in the 25 m pistol, accumulating scores of 478.5 and 576 points, respectively. Fernandez also competed at the 1996 Summer Olympics in Atlanta, Georgia, 2000 Summer Olympics in Sydney, and 2004 Summer Olympics in Athens, but she neither reached the final round, nor claimed an Olympic medal.

Sixteen years after competing in her first Olympics, Fernandez qualified for her fifth Spanish team, as a 46-year-old, at the 2008 Summer Olympics in Beijing, by placing second in the air pistol from the second meet of the 2006 ISSF World Cup series in Resende, Rio de Janeiro, Brazil, with a score of 783.2 points. She placed twenty-fifth out of forty-four shooters in the women's 10 m air pistol by one point behind Mongolian-born German shooter and five-time Olympian Munkhbayar Dorjsuren from the final attempt, with a total score of 379 targets. Three days later, Fernandez competed for her second event, 25 m pistol, where she was able to shoot 291 targets in the precision stage, and 278 in the rapid fire, for a total score of 569 points, finishing only in thirty-sixth place.

== Olympic results ==
Event	1992	1996	2000	2004	2008
25 metre pistol	12th 576	9th 578	20th 575	13th 577	36th 569
10 metre air pistol	6th 382+96.5	19th 378	16th 379	30th 374	25th 379
