= Shooting at the 2004 Summer Olympics – Women's 10 metre air pistol =

Women's 10 metre air pistol at the Games of the XXVIII Olympiad
- Venue: Markópoulo Olympic Shooting; Centre
- Date: August 15, 2004
- Competitors: 41 from 30 nations
- Winning score: 483.3

Medalists
1st place, gold medalist(s)		Olena Kostevych; Ukraine
2nd place, silver medalist(s)		Jasna Šekarić; Serbia and Montenegro
3rd place, bronze medalist(s)		Mariya Grozdeva; Bulgaria

The women's 10 metre air pistol competition at the 2004 Summer Olympics was held on August 15 at the Markópoulo Olympic Shooting Centre near Athens, Greece.

The event consisted of two rounds: a qualifier and a final. In the qualifier, each shooter fired 40 shots with an air pistol at 10 metres distance. Scores for each shot were in increments of 1, with a maximum score of 10.

The top 8 shooters in the qualifying round moved on to the final round. There, they fired an additional 10 shots. These shots scored in increments of .1, with a maximum score of 10.9. The total score from all 50 shots was used to determine final ranking.

19-year-old Ukrainian shooter Olena Kostevych came from behind to outplay Serbia and Montenegro's five-time Olympian and a previous Olympic champion Jasna Šekarić in a one-shot tiebreaker 10.2 to 9.4 for the gold medal in air pistol shooting, as a result of their draw in a 10-shot final round for first place with a score of 483.3 points. Meanwhile, the bronze medal was awarded to Bulgaria's Mariya Grozdeva, who beat China's current world record holder Ren Jie in another shoot-off 10.4 to 9.8, after having been tied in the final at 482.3, just one point behind the two medalists.

== Records ==
Prior to this competition, the existing world and Olympic records were as follows.

Qualification records
World record	Svetlana Smirnova (RUS)	393	Munich, Germany	23 May 1998
Olympic record	Tao Luna (CHN)	391	Sydney, Australia	17 September 2000

Final records
World record	Ren Jie (CHN)	493.5 (390+103.5)	Munich, Germany	22 May 1999
Olympic record	Olga Klochneva (RUS)	490.1 (389+101.1)	Atlanta, United States	21 July 1996

== Qualification round ==
Rank	Athlete	Country	1	2	3	4	Total	Notes
1	Jasna Šekarić	Serbia and Montenegro	96	97	96	98	387	Q
2	Irada Ashumova	Azerbaijan	97	94	97	98	386	Q
3	Natalia Paderina	Russia	96	97	96	97	386	Q
4	Mariya Grozdeva	Bulgaria	96	97	96	97	386	Q
5	Munkhbayar Dorjsuren	Germany	96	98	94	97	385	Q
6	Ren Jie	China	95	96	96	97	384	Q
7	Cornelia Frölich	Switzerland	95	97	96	96	384	Q
8	Olena Kostevych	Ukraine	96	96	96	96	384	Q
9	Olga Kuznetsova	Russia	97	96	96	94	383	
10	Ahn Soo-kyeong	South Korea	98	93	94	97	382	
10	Yuliya Alipava	Belarus	96	97	94	95	382	
10	Yoko Inada	Japan	93	95	98	96	382	
10	Yuliya Korostylova	Ukraine	99	92	97	94	382	
10	Nino Salukvadze	Georgia	96	96	98	92	382	
15	Mirela Skoko-Ćelić	Croatia	95	97	94	95	381	
16	Viktoria Chaika	Belarus	96	92	97	95	380	
16	Otryadyn Gündegmaa	Mongolia	93	96	96	95	380	
16	Lenka Hyková	Czech Republic	94	97	94	95	380	
16	Rebecca Snyder	United States	96	94	94	96	380	
16	Claudia Verdicchio	Germany	92	95	98	95	380	
21	Lalita Yauhleuskaya	Australia	92	97	94	96	379	
21	Dorottya Erdős	Hungary	95	95	94	95	379	
21	Susanne Meyerhoff	Denmark	94	97	93	95	379	
21	Park Ah-young	South Korea	93	96	98	92	379	
25	Michiko Fukushima	Japan	92	97	95	94	378	
26	Zsófia Csonka	Hungary	96	91	96	94	377	
26	Marina Karaflou	Greece	94	95	93	95	377	
28	Nasim Hassanpour	Iran	94	94	94	94	376	
28	Linda Ryan	Australia	94	97	91	94	376	
30	Elizabeth Callahan	United States	89	98	95	92	374	
30	María Pilar Fernández	Spain	94	94	93	93	374	
30	Brigitte Roy	France	95	91	94	94	374	
33	Galina Belyayeva	Kazakhstan	96	91	93	93	373	
34	Lo Ka Kay	Hong Kong	92	95	94	90	371	
35	Grettel Barboza	Costa Rica	94	94	91	89	368	
35	Amanda Mondol	Colombia	91	93	93	91	368	
35	Margarita Tarradell	Cuba	91	94	92	91	368	
38	Monika Rieder	Switzerland	91	92	91	92	366	
38	Tao Luna	China	94	93	89	90	366	
40	Carmen Malo	Ecuador	92	91	91	91	365	
41	Francis Gorrin	Venezuela	91	90	89	88	358	

== Final ==
Rank	Athlete	Qual	1	2	3	4	5	6	7	8	9	10	Final	Total	5th place shoot-off	Bronze shoot-off	Gold shoot-off
1st place, gold medalist(s)	Olena Kostevych (UKR)	384	10.6	9.9	10.2	9.5	10.0	9.4	9.4	10.4	10.0	9.9	99.3	483.3			10.2
2nd place, silver medalist(s)	Jasna Šekarić (SCG)	387	10.3	8.6	9.1	8.7	8.9	10.1	9.8	10.1	10.6	10.1	96.3	483.3			9.4
3rd place, bronze medalist(s)	Mariya Grozdeva (BUL)	386	9.5	8.2	9.9	9.8	9.8	10.1	9.3	9.7	9.1	10.9	96.3	482.3		10.4	
4	Ren Jie (CHN)	384	8.9	8.2	10.7	10.7	10.4	10.4	10.5	9.0	9.4	10.1	98.3	482.3		9.7	
5	Natalia Paderina (RUS)	386	9.1	9.5	10.1	9.5	10.6	10.1	9.2	8.1	10.0	9.7	95.9	481.9	10.0		
6	Munkhbayar Dorjsuren (GER)	385	10.1	10.6	9.7	9.5	9.0	10.1	9.7	9.3	9.5	9.4	96.9	481.9	9.3		
7	Cornelia Frölich (SUI)	384	10.3	9.7	9.5	9.6	10.0	10.0	10.4	8.6	9.6	9.8	97.5	481.5			
8	Irada Ashumova (AZE)	386	10.4	9.4	10.2	10.2	10.5	8.5	8.3	9.9	9.6	8.4	95.4	481.4			
