= Anne Goffin =

Belgian sport shooter

Anne Goffin (born 23 January 1957 in Arlon) is a Belgian sport shooter. She competed in pistol shooting events at the Summer Olympics in 1976, 1988, and 1992.

== Olympic results ==
Event	1976	1988	1992
50 metre pistol (mixed)	T-43rd	Not held	
25 metre pistol (women)	Not held	T-12th	39th
10 metre air pistol (women)	Not held	4th	T-15th
