= Grettel Barboza =

Costa Rican sport shooter

Personal information
- Full name: Grettel Barboza
- Nationality: Costa Rica
- Born: 6 September 1956 (age 69) San José, Costa Rica
- Height: 1.67 m (5 ft 5 1/2 in)
- Weight: 82 kg (181 lb)

Sport
- Sport: Shooting
- Event: 10 m air pistol (AP40)

Grettel Barboza (born September 6, 1956 in San José) is a Costa Rican sport shooter. She competed for Costa Rica at the 2004 Summer Olympics, finishing thirty-fifth in the air pistol.

Barboza qualified as the 47-year-old lone shooter for the Costa Rican squad in the women's 10 m air pistol at the 2004 Summer Olympics in Athens. She had been granted an Olympic invitation for her country by ISSF and IOC, having registered a minimum qualifying score of 367 at the ISSF World Cup meet in Atlanta, Georgia, United States three years earlier. Barboza fired a lowly 368 out of a possible 400 to force a three-way tie with her fellow Latin American markswomen Amanda Mondol of Colombia and triple Olympian Margarita Tarradell of Cuba for thirty-fifth place in the qualifying round, failing to advance further to the final.
