= Margraff =

Margraff is a surname. Notable people with the surname include:

- Inés Margraff (born 1958), Ecuadorian sports shooter
- Jean Margraff (1876–1959), French fencer
- Jim Margraff (1960–2019), American football player and coach
- Paúl Margraff (born 1946), Ecuadorian sport shooter
