= Galina Belyayeva (disambiguation) =

Galina Belyayeva (born 1961) is a Soviet and Russian film and theatre actress.

Galina Belyayeva may also refer to:

- Galina Belyayeva (sport shooter, born 1951), Russian-Kazakhstani sport shooter
- Galina Belyayeva (sport shooter, born 1967), Russian sport shooter
