= Ágnes Ferencz =

Hungarian sport shooter

Ágnes Ferencz (born October 11, 1956 in Budapest) is a Hungarian sport shooter. She competed in pistol shooting events at the Summer Olympics in 1988 and 1992.

== Olympic results ==
Event	1988	1992
25 metre pistol (women)	5th	T-26th
10 metre air pistol (women)	T-27th	T-15th
