= Jelena Tripolski =

Israeli sports shooter (born 1967)

Personal information
- Native name: יילנה טריפולסקי
- National team: Israel
- Born: November 18, 1967 (age 57)
- Occupation: Electronic engineer

Sport
- Sport: Sport shooting
- Events: Women's Sporting Pistol, 25 metres; Women's Air Pistol, 10 metres
- Updated on 1 September 2016

Jelena Tripolski (Hebrew: יילנה טריפולסקי; also "Yelena"; born November 18, 1967) is an Israeli former Olympic sport shooter. She is Jewish, immigrated to Israel, and is an electronic engineer.

== Shooting career ==
Tripolski competed for Israel at the 1992 Summer Olympics in Barcelona, at the age of 24, in Shooting--Women's Sporting Pistol, 25 metres, and came in tied for 21st with a score of 573. She also competed in Shooting--Women's Air Pistol, 10 metres, and came in tied for 37th with a score of 372.
