= Breker =

Breker is a surname. Notable people with the surname include:

- Arno Breker (1900–1991), German sculptor
- Lieselotte Breker (1960–2022), German sport shooter
