= Lynne-Marie Freh =

Australian sports shooter (born 1954)

Lynne-Marie Freh (born 19 October 1954) is an Australian sport shooter. She competed at the 1992 Summer Olympics in the women's 25 metre pistol event, in which she placed seventh, and the women's 10 metre air pistol event, in which she tied for 39th place.
