= Daniela Dumitrascu =

Romanian sport shooter

Daniela Dumitrascu (born July 26, 1968) is a Romanian sport shooter. She competed at the 1992 Summer Olympics in the women's 25 metre pistol, in which she tied for 14th place, and the women's 10 metre air pistol, in which she placed seventh.
