= Christine Strahalm =

Austrian sport shooter

Christine Strahalm (born 10 April 1942) is an Austrian sport shooter. She competed at the 1988 Summer Olympics in the women's 25 metre pistol event, in which she tied for 16th place, and the women's 10 metre air pistol event, in which she placed eighth.
