= Cris Kajd =

Swedish sport shooter

Cris Kajd (born September 9, 1951 in Norrköping) is a Swedish sport shooter. She competed in pistol shooting events at the Summer Olympics in 1984, 1988, and 1992.

== Olympic results ==
Event	1984	1988	1992
25 metre pistol (women)	11th	—	T-21st
10 metre air pistol (women)	—	9th	5th
