= Margarita Tarradell =

Cuban sports shooter (born 1962)

Personal information
- Full name: Margarita Tarradell Asencio
- Nationality: Cuba
- Born: 30 November 1962 (age 63) Santiago de Cuba, Cuba
- Height: 1.54 m (5 ft 1/2 in)
- Weight: 60 kg (132 lb)

Sport
- Sport: Shooting
- Event(s): 10 m air pistol (AP40); 25 m pistol (SP)
Medal record
Women's shooting
Representing Cuba
Pan American Games
Gold medal – first place	1991 Havana	SP
Silver medal – second place	1995 Mar del Plata	SP
Silver medal – second place	2003 Santo Domingo	SP
Bronze medal – third place	1999 Winnipeg	AP40

Margarita Tarradell Asencio (born November 30, 1962, in Santiago de Cuba) is a Cuban sport shooter. She has competed for Cuba in pistol shooting at three Olympics (1992, 2000, and 2004), and has produced an illustrious career tally of fifteen medals in a major international competition, a total of four (one gold, two silver, and one bronze) at the Pan American Games (1991 to 2003), a total of five (two gold and three silver) at the American Championships, and a total of six (four golds, one silver, and one bronze) at numerous meets of the ISSF World Cup series.

== Career ==
Tarradell competed internationally for Cuba at the 1991 Pan American Games in Havana, where she became the champion in sport pistol shooting. The following year, she made her first Cuban team at the 1992 Summer Olympics in Barcelona, finishing thirty-first in the air pistol and twenty-fourth in the sport pistol with scores of 374 and 572 respectively.

Despite missing out her 1996 Olympic bid, Tarradell came back from an eight-year absence to compete for her second Games in Sydney 2000, following a bronze-medal triumph in air pistol shooting at the Pan American Games a year earlier. From there, she finished in a five-way tie with a number of prominent shooters, including eventual Olympic bronze medalist Lalita Yauhleuskaya, for eleventh place in the air pistol, shooting a substantial 381 out of a possible 400. Tarradell also competed in the sport pistol, where she fired a total of 575 points (283 in precision and 292 in the rapid fire) to obtain a twentieth position.

In 2003, Tarradell reached the peak of her career by securing the silver medal in sport pistol shooting at the Pan American Games in Santo Domingo, Dominican Republic. Briefly commanding her lead throughout the final, Tarradell held a tiebreaker with U.S. shooter Sandra Uptagrafft for the gold, until she lost in a shoot-off by just three-tenths of a point. In spite of her tough defeat, she was also awarded an Olympic quota place for Cuba on her third Games.

At the 2004 Summer Olympics in Athens, Tarradell qualified for her third Cuban squad, as a 41-year-old, in both air and sport pistol. She managed to get a minimum qualifying score of 568 on her latter event to gain an Olympic quota place for Cuba in shooting, following a runner-up finish at the Pan American Games. in the 10 m air pistol, held on the third day of the Games, Tarradell fired a substandard 368 out of a possible 400 to share a thirty-fifth place tie with Colombia's Amanda Mondol and Costa Rica's Grettel Barboza in the qualifying round. Two days later, in the 25 m pistol, Tarradell shot 282 in precision and 283 in the rapid-fire stage to tally 565 in a two-way tie with Belarus' Viktoria Chaika for thirty-second position, just three points below her entry standard.

== Olympic results ==
Event	1992	2000	2004
25 metre pistol	24th 572	20th 575	32nd 565
10 metre air pistol	31st 374	11th 381	35th 368
