= Evelyne Manchon =

French sport shooter

Evelyne Manchon (born May 31, 1963 in Paris) is a French sport shooter. She competed in pistol shooting events at the Summer Olympics in 1984, 1988, and 1992.

== Olympic results ==
Event	1984	1988	1992
25 metre pistol (women)	9th	7th	9th
10 metre air pistol (women)	—	T-12th	T-24th
