= Kira Mozgalova =

Russian sport shooter

Personal information
- Full name: Kira Vladimirovna Mozgalova
- Nationality: Russia
- Born: 21 December 1982 (age 43) Moscow, Russian SFSR
- Height: 1.68 m (5 ft 6 in)
- Weight: 65 kg (143 lb)

Sport
- Sport: Shooting
- Events: 10 m air pistol (AP40); 25 m pistol (SP)
- Club: CSKA Moscow
- Coached by: Aleksandr Suslov
Medal record
Women's shooting
Representing Russia
World Championships
Gold medal – first place	2010 Munich	SP

Kira Vladimirovna Mozgalova (Russian: Кира Владимировна Мозгалова; born 21 December 1982 in Moscow) is a Russian sport shooter. She won a gold medal in the women's sport pistol at the 2010 ISSF World Shooting Championships in Munich, Germany, with a total score of 788.8 points (584 in the preliminary rounds and 204.8 in the final), earning her a spot on the Russian team for the Olympics. Mozgalova is also a member of the shooting team for CSKA Moscow, and is coached and trained by Aleksandr Suslov.

Mozgalova represented Russia at the 2012 Summer Olympics in London, where she competed in the women's 25 m pistol, along with her teammate Anna Mastyanina. Mozgalova progressed to the final of her respective event, after scoring a total of 585 targets (289 in the precision stage and 296 in the rapid fire) from the qualifying rounds. Unfortunately, she finished only in fifth place by four tenths of a point (0.4) behind Serbia's Zorana Arunović, with a total score of 786.9 targets (201.9 in the final).
