= Anna Gönczi =

Hungarian sports shooter

Personal information
- Full name: Annamária Gönczi
- Born: 2 April 1959 (age 67) Budapest, Hungary
- Height: 170 cm (5 ft 7 in)
- Weight: 74 kg (163 lb)

Sport
- Country: Hungary
- Sport: Sports shooting

Annamária Gönczi (born 2 April 1959) is a Hungarian sports shooter. She competed at the 1988 Summer Olympics and the 1992 Summer Olympics.

Gönczi finished 16th in the 10 metre air pistol and 28th in the 25 metre pistol at the 1988 Olympics, followed by 24th in the Shooting at the 1992 Summer Olympics – Women's 10 metre air pistol and 12th in the 25 metre pistol at the 1992 Olympics. She also won a team bronze medal in the 10 metre air pistol at the 1989 World Shooting Championships.

== Personal life ==
She is a daughter of Ferenc Gönczi (1935–2009), who finished 20th in the 50 metre pistol event at the 1964 Summer Olympics.
