= Roxane Thompson =

American sports shooter

Personal information
- Nationality: American
- Born: July 9, 1964 (age 60); Sandpoint, Idaho, United States

Sport
- Sport: Sports shooting

Roxane Thompson (born July 9, 1964) is an American sports shooter. She competed in the women's 25 metre pistol event at the 1992 Summer Olympics.
