= Chen Sheu-shya =

Taiwanese sports shooter

Personal information
- Nationality: Taiwanese
- Born: 5 July 1959 (age 65)

Sport
- Sport: Sports shooting

Chen Sheu-shya (born 5 July 1959) is a Taiwanese sports shooter. She competed in the women's 10 metre air pistol event at the 1992 Summer Olympics.
