= Kristina Fries =

Swedish sport shooter

Kristina Fries (born August 20, 1962 in Jönköping) is a Swedish sport shooter. She competed at the Summer Olympics in 1984 and 1988. In 1984, she placed fifth in the women's 25 metre pistol event, and in 1988, she placed sixth in the women's 25 metre pistol event.
