= Rachel Morin (sport shooter) =

French sports shooter

Personal information
- Nationality: French
- Born: 29 February 1948 (age 77)

Sport
- Sport: Sports shooting

Rachel Morin (born 29 February 1948) is a French sports shooter. She competed in the women's 10 metre air pistol event at the 1988 Summer Olympics.
