= Maria Grozdeva =

Bulgarian sport shooter

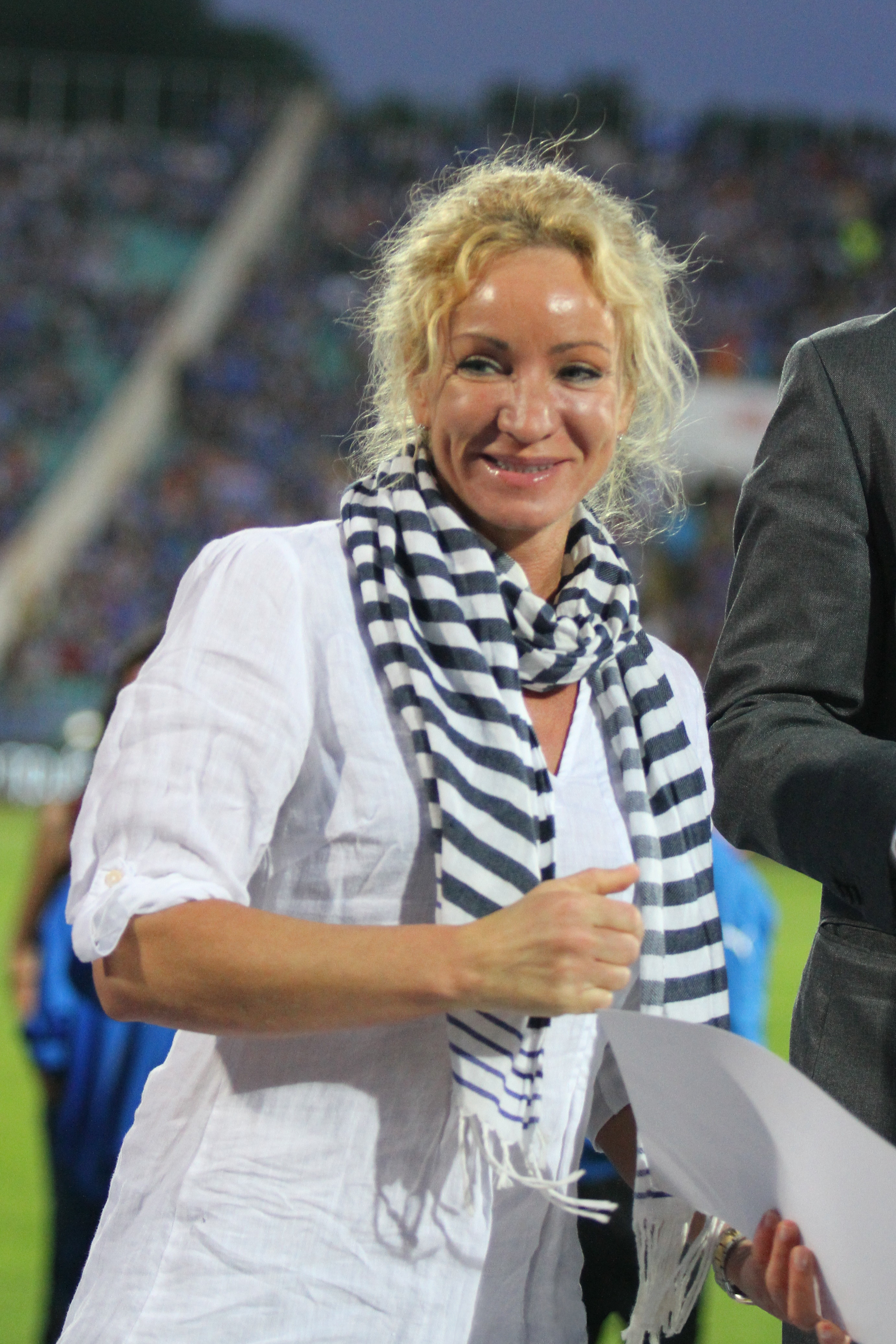
- Grozdeva in 2014

Personal information
- Full name: Maria Zdravkova Grozdeva
- Born: 23 June 1972 (age 54) Sofia, Bulgaria
Medal record
Women's shooting
Representing Bulgaria
Olympic Games
Gold medal – first place	2000 Sydney	25 m pistol
Gold medal – first place	2004 Athens	25 m pistol
Bronze medal – third place	1992 Barcelona	10 m air pistol
Bronze medal – third place	1996 Atlanta	10 m air pistol
Bronze medal – third place	2004 Athens	10 m air pistol

Maria Zdravkova Grozdeva-Grigorova (Bulgarian: Мария Здравкова Гроздева-Григорова; born on 23 June 1972) is a Bulgarian retired sport shooter, who competed in 25 metre pistol and 10 metre air pistol. She is the only woman to have successfully defended the 25 metre pistol title at the Olympic Games. She competed at the 2020 Summer Olympics, in Women's 25 metre pistol, and Women's 10 metre air pistol.

Apart from her five Olympic medals including two gold medals, Grozdeva also has been successful at CISM World Championships and ISSF World Cups. She is also the current holder of the final world record in 25 metre pistol. She was named the 2004 Bulgarian Sportsperson of the Year. She was also named the 2004 BTA Best Balkan Athlete of the Year.

== Life ==
Grozdeva was born on 23 June 1972 in Sofia. She began shooting at the age of 11, and graduated in sports shooting from the National Sports Academy. She is married to her coach Valeri Grigorov, with whom she has three children.

Grozdeva announced her decision to retire from professional sports after competing in the 2020 Summer Olympics. She was among the founders of the Bulgarian Shooting Union and served as its president between 2012 and 2022, being succeeded by Vesela Letcheva.

== Other endeavors ==
In, 2009 Grozdeva competed as a house guest in the third season of the reality show VIP Brother. She made it into the final three and then placed runner up for the season.

== Olympic results ==
Event	1992	1996	2000	2004	2008	2012	2020
25 metre pistol	18th 574	21st 574	(gold) Gold; 589+101.3	(gold) Gold; 585+103.2	5th 583+203.6	9th 583	27th 578
10 metre air pistol	(bronze) Bronze; 383+98.6	(bronze) Bronze; 389+99.5	38th 367	(bronze) Bronze; 386+96.3	11th 382	24th 378	43rd 559

== Records ==
Current world records held in 25 metre pistol
Women (CISM)	Individual	590	Li Duihong (CHN); Maria Grozdeva (BUL); Stephanie Thurmann (GER); Zhang Mengyuan (CHN); Doreen Vennekamp (GER)	1993; 1996; 2015; June 2, 2018; June 2, 2018	(NOR) (SWE) (KOR); Thun (SUI); Thun (SUI)

Olympic Games
Preceded by Ivo Yanakiev; Ivet Lalova-Collio	Flagbearer for Bulgaria; Athens 2004; Tokyo 2020	Succeeded by Petar Stoychev; Incumbent
