= Julita Macur =

Polish sport shooter (born 1959)

Julita Macur (born 1 March 1959 in Zielona Góra) is a Polish sport shooter. She competed in pistol shooting events at the Summer Olympics in 1992 and 1996.

== Olympic results ==
Event	1992	1996
25 metre pistol (women)	8th	8th
10 metre air pistol (women)	T-39th	T-27th
