= Khatijah Surattee =

Singaporean sports shooter

Personal information
- Nationality: Singaporean
- Born: 5 February 1950 (age 75)

Sport
- Sport: Sports shooting

Khatijah Surattee (born 5 February 1950) is a Singaporean sports shooter. She competed in the women's 10 metre air pistol event at the 1988 Summer Olympics.
