= Maria Amaral (sport shooter) =

Brazilian sports shooter (1931–2016)

Personal information
- Born: 6 November 1931 Salvador, Brazil
- Died: 18 August 2016 (aged 84)

Sport
- Sport: Sports shooting

Maria Nelly Padilha Amaral (6 November 1931 – 18 August 2016) was a Brazilian sports shooter. She competed in two events at the 1988 Summer Olympics. Amaral died on 18 August 2016, at the age of 84.
