= Valerie Winter =

Australian sports shooter

Personal information
- Nationality: Australian
- Born: 15 October 1936
- Died: 18 June 2024 (aged 87) Adelaide, South Australia

Sport
- Sport: Sports shooting

Valerie Ann Winter (née Leverington, 15 October 1936 – 18 June 2024) was an Australian sports shooter. She competed in two events at the 1988 Summer Olympics.
