= Martine Guépin =

French sports shooter

Personal information
- Nationality: French
- Born: 15 May 1951 (age 73)

Sport
- Sport: Sports shooting

Martine Guépin (born 15 May 1951) is a French sports shooter. She competed in the women's 25 metre pistol event at the 1988 Summer Olympics.
