= Dorota Bidołach =

Polish sports shooter

Personal information
- Nationality: Polish
- Born: 22 June 1957 (age 67); Zielona Góra, Poland

Sport
- Sport: Sports shooting

Dorota Bidołach (born 22 June 1957) is a Polish sports shooter. She competed in two events at the 1988 Summer Olympics.
