= Li Shuanghong =

Chinese sports shooter

Personal information
- Nationality: Chinese
- Born: 25 January 1970 (age 55); Daqing, China

Sport
- Sport: Sports shooting

Li Shuanghong (born 25 January 1970 in Daqing) is a Chinese sport shooter. She competed in rifle shooting events at the 1992 Summer Olympics. She is the twin sister of Li Duihong, a gold medalist in shooting.

== Olympic results ==
| Event | 1992 |
|---|---|
| 10 metre air rifle (women) | 9th |
