= Inés Margraff =

Ecuadorian sports shooter

Personal information
- Nationality: Ecuadorian
- Born: 17 January 1958 (age 67)

Sport
- Sport: Sports shooting

Inés Margraff (born 17 January 1958) is an Ecuadorian sports shooter. She competed in the women's 10 metre air pistol event at the 1988 Summer Olympics.
