= Liu Haiying =

Chinese sport shooter

Liu Haiying (born 3 April 1964) is a Chinese sport shooter who competed in the 1984 Summer Olympics and in the 1988 Summer Olympics.
