= Francine Antonietti =

Swiss sports shooter

Personal information
- Nationality: Swiss
- Born: 30 September 1946 (age 78)

Sport
- Sport: Sports shooting

Francine Antonietti (born 30 September 1946) is a Swiss sports shooter. She competed in two events at the 1988 Summer Olympics.
