= Yvonna Ježová =

Czech sport shooter

Personal information
- Nationality: Czech
- Born: 21 July 1966 (age 59) Hranice, Czechoslovakia

Sport
- Sport: Sport shooting

Yvonna Ježová (born 21 July 1966) is a Czech sport shooter. She competed in two events at the 1988 Summer Olympics.
