= Galina Belyayeva (sport shooter, born 1967) =

Russian sport shooter

Personal information
- Full name: Galina Viktorovna Belyayeva
- Nationality: Russia
- Born: 23 September 1967 (age 58) Yekaterinburg, Russian SFSR, Soviet Union
- Height: 1.68 m (5 ft 6 in)
- Weight: 64 kg (141 lb)

Sport
- Sport: Shooting
- Event(s): 10 m air pistol (AP40); 25 m pistol (SP)
- Club: CSKA Moscow
- Coached by: Anatoliy Suslov

Galina Viktorovna Belyayeva (Russian: Галина Викторовна Беляева; born 23 September 1967 in Yekaterinburg) is a Russian sport shooter. She has been selected to compete for Russia in pistol shooting at the 2004 Summer Olympics, and has won a total of seven medals (one gold, three silver, and three bronze) at various meets of the ISSF World Cup series between 1992 and 2002. Belyayeva trains under head coach Anatoliy Suslov for the national team, while serving in the military at CSKA Moscow.

Belyayeva qualified for the Russian squad in the women's 25 m pistol at the 2004 Summer Olympics in Athens. She managed to get a minimum qualifying score of 581 to join with her fellow markswoman Natalia Paderina and fill in the Olympic quota place won by Irina Dolgacheva from the Worlds for Russia, following her sixth-place finish at the 2002 ISSF World Cup meet in Atlanta, Georgia, United States. Belyayeva shot a seamless 287 in precision and 279 in the rapid fire stage for an aggregate score of 566 points to finish in a distant thirty-first from a field of thirty-seven shooters.
