= Li Duihong =

Chinese sport shooter

Personal information
- Born: January 25, 1970 (age 56) Daqing, Heilongjiang, China
Medal record
Women's shooting
Representing China
Olympic Games
| Gold medal – first place | 1996 Atlanta | 25 m pistol |
| Silver medal – second place | 1992 Barcelona | 25 m pistol |

Li Duihong (Chinese: 李对红; born January 25, 1970) is a female Chinese sports shooter. She won the 1996 Atlanta Olympic Games in the 25m sport pistol. Li was born in Daqing, Heilongjiang. She has a twin sister named Li Shuanghong.

== Olympic results ==
| Event | 1992 | 1996 |
|---|---|---|
| 25 metre pistol | (silver) Silver; 586+94 | (gold) Gold; 589+98.9 |
| 10 metre air pistol | — | 15th 379 |

== Other major performances ==
- 1982 Hawana World Cup – 1st small-bore sporting pistol
- 1993 Oslo CISM World Shooting Championships – 1st sporting pistol individual (CISM record), 2nd sporting pistol team, 2nd military pistol rapid-fire individual & team
- 1994 World Championships – 1st 10 air pistol team & 25m sporting pistol team, 3rd 25m sporting pistol individual, 4th 10m air pistol 40 shots individual
- 1995 Rome World Games for Armymen – 1st central-fire pistol team & 25m pistol rapid-fire team
- 2001 CISM World Shooting Championships – 1st sporting pistol individual & team
- 2002 World Championships – 1st 25m sporting pistol team

== Records ==
Current world records held in 25 metre pistol
| Women (ISSF) | Teams | 1768 | China (Chen, Li, Tao) | October 4, 2002 | Busan (KOR) |
| Women (CISM) | Individual | 590 | Li Duihong (CHN); Maria Grozdeva (BUL); Stephanie Thurmann (GER); Zhang Mengyuan (CHN); Doreen Vennekamp (GER) | 1993; 1996; 2015; June 2, 2018; June 2, 2018 | (NOR) (SWE) (KOR); Thun (SUI); Thun (SUI) |
