= Marina Logvinenko =

Russian sport shooter

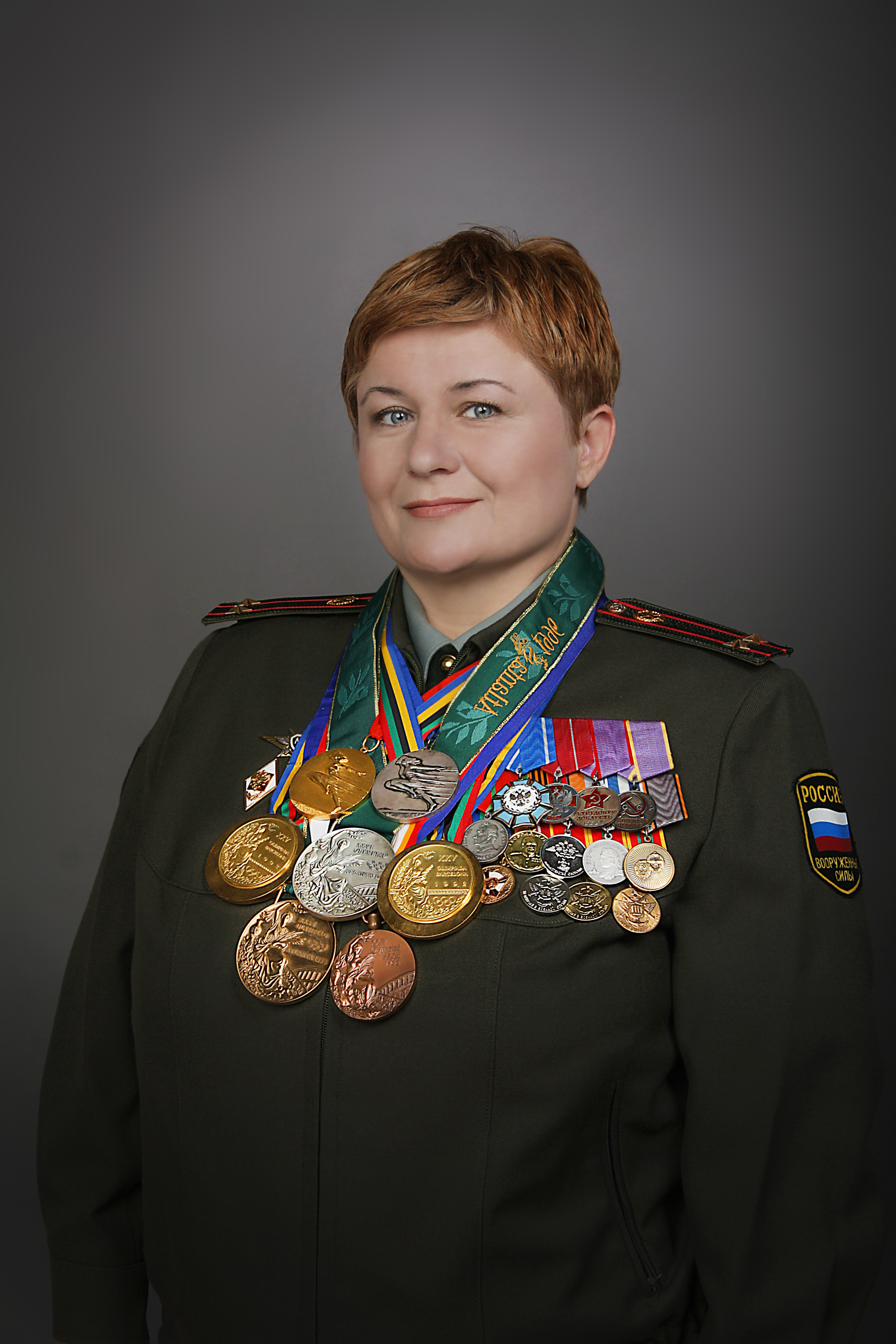

Personal information
- Full name: Marina Viktorovna Logvinenko
- Born: 1 September 1961 (age 64) Shakhty, Russian SFSR, Soviet Union
Medal record
Women's shooting
Olympic Games
Representing Soviet Union
Bronze medal – third place	1988 Seoul	10 m air pistol
Representing Unified Team
Gold medal – first place	1992 Barcelona	10 m air pistol
Gold medal – first place	1992 Barcelona	25 m pistol
Representing Russia
Silver medal – second place	1996 Atlanta	10 m air pistol
Bronze medal – third place	1996 Atlanta	25 m pistol
World Championships
Representing Soviet Union
Gold medal – first place	1982 Caracas	10 m air pistol
Gold medal – first place	1985 Mexico	10 m air pistol
Gold medal – first place	1986 Suhl	25 m pistol
Gold medal – first place	1990 Moscow	25 m pistol
Gold medal – first place	1991 Stavanger	10 m air pistol
Silver medal – second place	1986 Suhl	10 m air pistol
Silver medal – second place	1990 Moscow	10 m air pistol
Bronze medal – third place	1981 Santo Domingo	10 m air pistol
Representing Russia
Bronze medal – third place	1998 Barcelona	25 m pistol

Marina Viktorovna Logvinenko (Russian: Марина Викторовна Логвиненко, née Dobrancheva, born 1 September 1961) is a Russian sport shooter, specializing in the pistol events.

== Biography ==
Logvinenko was born in Shakhty. She competed at four Olympic Games and won five Olympic medals. At 1992 Olympics, she won both the 10 metre air pistol and 25 metre pistol event. She is the only woman and one of five athletes to win two individual shooting gold medals during one Olympics.

== Olympic results ==
Event	1988	1992	1996	2000
10 metre air pistol	(bronze) Bronze; 385+100.2	(gold) Gold; 387+99.4	(silver) Silver; 390+98.5	—
25 metre pistol	8th 585+97	(gold) Gold; 587+97	(bronze) Bronze; 583+101.2	9th 580
