= Tania Pérez =

Cuban sports shooter (born 1959)

Personal information
- Nationality: Cuban
- Born: 2 June 1959 (age 66)

Sport
- Sport: Sports shooting

Tania Pérez (born 2 June 1959) is a Cuban sports shooter. She competed in two events at the 1992 Summer Olympics.
