= Svetlana Smirnova (sport shooter) =

Russian sport shooter

Svetlana Alekseyevna Smirnova
Personal information
- Full name: Svetlana Alekseyevna; Smirnova
- Nationality: Russia
- Born: 10 March 1962 (age 64) Pskov, Russian SFSR
- Height: 1.63 m (5 ft 4 in)
- Weight: 61 kg (134 lb)

Sport
- Sport: Shooting
- Events: 10 m air pistol (AP40); 25 m pistol (SP)
- Club: Dynamo St. Petersburg
- Coached by: Alexandr Suslov
Medal record
Women's shooting
Representing Soviet Union
World Championships
Silver medal – second place	1987 Budapest	AP40
Bronze medal – third place	1990 Moscow	AP40

Svetlana Alekseyevna Smirnova (née Veresova) (Russian: Светлана Алексеевна Смирнова; born 10 March 1962 in Pskov) is a Russian sport shooter. She won two medals (silver and bronze), as a member of the Soviet Union shooting team, at the 1987 ISSF World Shooting Championships in Budapest, Hungary, and at the 1990 ISSF World Shooting Championships in Moscow, Russia. She also captured a total of 26 medals (8 gold, 10 silver, 8 bronze), and set a world record of 493 points (1998 in Munich) at the ISSF World Cup.

At age thirty-four, Smirnova made her official debut for the 1996 Summer Olympics in Atlanta, where she placed fifteenth in the women's 25 m pistol, with a score of 576 points, tying her position with four other shooters including Mongolia's Munkhbayar Dorjsuren and Azerbaijan's Irada Ashumova.

At the 2000 Summer Olympics in Sydney, Smirnova reached the final of the women's 10 m air pistol; however, she missed out of the medal by three tenths of a point (0.3) behind Australia's Annemarie Forder (484.0), with a total score of 483.7 points (384 in the preliminary rounds and 99.7 in the final).

Eight years after competing in her last Olympics, Smirnova qualified for the women's 10 m air pistol, as a 46-year-old, at the 2008 Summer Olympics in Beijing. She finished only in ninth place, and thereby missed out of the final by one point behind Finland's Mira Nevansuu, for a total score of 383 targets.
