= Selvyana Adrian-Sofyan =

Indonesian sport shooter (born 1951)

Personal information
- Nationality: Indonesia
- Born: 26 February 1951 (age 75)
- Height: 1.51 m (4 ft 11 in)
- Weight: 52 kg (115 lb)

Sport
- Sport: Shooting

Selvyana Adrian-Sofyan (born 26 February 1951) is an Indonesian sport shooter. She competed in the 1984 and 1988 Summer Olympics.
