= Munkhbayar Dorjsuren =

Mongolian-German sport shooter

Personal information
- Full name: Munkhbayar Dorjsuren (as German citizen)
- Born: Dorjsürengiin Mönkhbayar; July 9, 1969 (age 56) Ulaanbaatar, Mongolia
- Height: 1.67 m (5 ft 6 in)

Sport
- Country: Germany; Mongolia
- Sport: Women's air pistol
- Event(s): 10 metre, 25 metre
- Club: Sport Gemeinschaft Grafing
- Coached by: Peter Kraneis
Medal record
Women's shooting
Representing Mongolia
Olympic Games
Bronze medal – third place	1992 Barcelona	25 m pistol
World Championships
Gold medal – first place	1998 Barcelona-Zaragoza	10 m air pistol
Representing Germany
Olympic Games
Bronze medal – third place	2008 Beijing	25 m pistol
World Championships
Gold medal – first place	2002 Lahti	25 m pistol

Munkhbayar Dorjsuren (born Dorjsürengiin Mönkhbayar, Mongolian: Доржсүрэнгийн Мөнхбаяр; born July 9, 1969) is a Mongolian-German sport shooter. She was born in Ulaanbaatar, Mongolia, but moved to Germany and became a German citizen. She is the 1992 Olympic bronze medalist in the Women's 25 metre pistol for Mongolia and the 2008 Olympic bronze medalist in the same event for Germany. She competed in the 25 metre and 10 metre air pistol events.

== Career ==
=== Mongolia ===
Dorjsuren has competed at six Summer Olympic Games. She represented Mongolia at the 1992 Summer Olympics, at the 1996 Summer Olympics, and at the 2000 Summer Olympics. At the 1992 Summer Olympics she won the bronze medal in the women's 25 metre pistol category. She won the 1998 ISSF World Shooting Championships in 10 metre air pistol for Mongolia.

=== Germany ===
She represented Germany at the 2004 Summer Olympics, at the 2008 Summer Olympics and at the 2012 Summer Olympics. She won the 2002 ISSF World Shooting Championships in 25 metre pistol while representing Germany. Dorjsuren won gold in the Milan leg of the 2009 ISSF World Cup, 25 metre pistol category.

As of 2009, she lived in Munich, Germany.

=== India ===
In July 2022, the National Rifle Association of India appointed Dorjsuren as the Indian pistol team's foreign coach. She was the coach for the Indian team that won the bronze medal in the mixed 10 metre air pistol event at the 2024 Summer Olympics in Paris.

== Citizenship change ==
After her participation in Sydney Olympics in 2000, Munkhbayar D. moved to Germany and in 2002, she became a German citizen. In June 2013, she requested to become Mongolian citizen again.

== Results ==
Olympic results
Event	1992	1996	2000	2004	2008	2012
25 metre pistol	(bronze) Bronze; 584+95	15th 576	25th 573	5th 583+101.6	(bronze) Bronze; 587+202.2	12th 582
10 metre air pistol	21st 376	21st 377	36th 368	6th 385+96.9	24th 379	25th 378
