= Lieselotte Breker =

German sport shooter

Lieselotte Breker (15 February 1960 – 20 July 2022) was a German sport shooter. She competed in pistol shooting events at the Summer Olympics in 1988 and 1992. She was born in Hanau.

== Olympic results ==
Event	1988	1992
25 metre pistol (women)	4th	10th
10 metre air pistol (women)	7th	T-15th
