= Rampai Sriyai =

Thai sports shooter (born 1955)

Personal information
- Nationality: Thai
- Born: 23 June 1955 (age 70)

Sport
- Sport: Sports shooting

Rampai Sriyai née Yamfang (รำไพ ศรีใย (แย้มแฟง), born 23 February 1955) is a Thai former sports shooter and police officer. She competed at the 1988 Summer Olympics and the 1992 Summer Olympics. She served as a police officer until voluntary early retirement in 2013, when she was granted the rank of police colonel.
