= Regina Kodymová-Jirkalová =

Czech sport shooter

Personal information
- Nationality: Czech
- Born: 22 January 1966 (age 60) České Budějovice, Czechoslovakia

Sport
- Sport: Sport shooting

Regina Kodymová-Jirkalová (born 22 January 1966) is a Czech sport shooter. She competed at the 1992 Summer Olympics and the 1996 Summer Olympics.
