= Corinne Serra Tosio =

French sports shooter

Personal information
- Nationality: French
- Born: 30 September 1965 (age 59); Aix-en-Provence, France

Sport
- Sport: Sports shooting

Corinne Serra Tosio (born 30 September 1965) is a French sports shooter. She competed in two events at the 1992 Summer Olympics.
