= Jana Kubala =

Austrian sports shooter

Personal information
- Nationality: Austrian
- Born: 21 August 1966 (age 58); Zlín, Czechoslovakia

Sport
- Sport: Sports shooting

Jana Kubala (born 21 August 1966) is an Austrian sports shooter. She competed in two events at the 1992 Summer Olympics.
