= Hisayo Chikusa =

Japanese sport shooter (born 1962)

Hisayo Chikusa (千種寿代 (Chikusa Hisayo) born 2 January 1962) is a Japanese sport shooter who competed in the 1988 Summer Olympics and in the 1992 Summer Olympics.
