= Kim Dyer =

American sports shooter (born 1947)

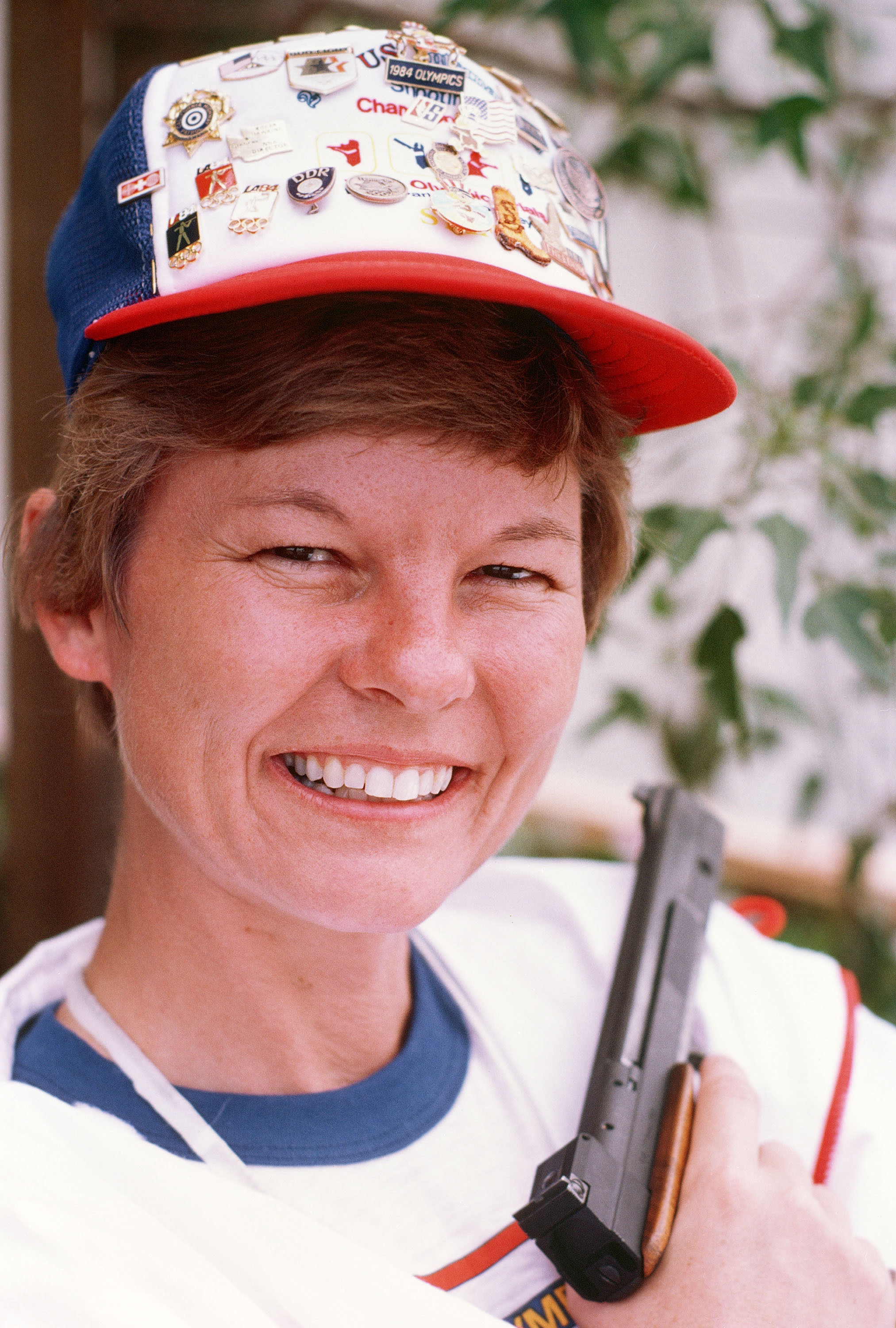
- Dyer in 1984

Personal information
- Born: February 1, 1947 (age 78); Hammond [Louisiana], United States

Sport
- Sport: Sports shooting

Kim Dyer (born February 1, 1947) is an American sports shooter. She competed at the 1984 Summer Olympics and the 1988 Summer Olympics.
