= Ruby Fox =

American sports shooter (born 1945)

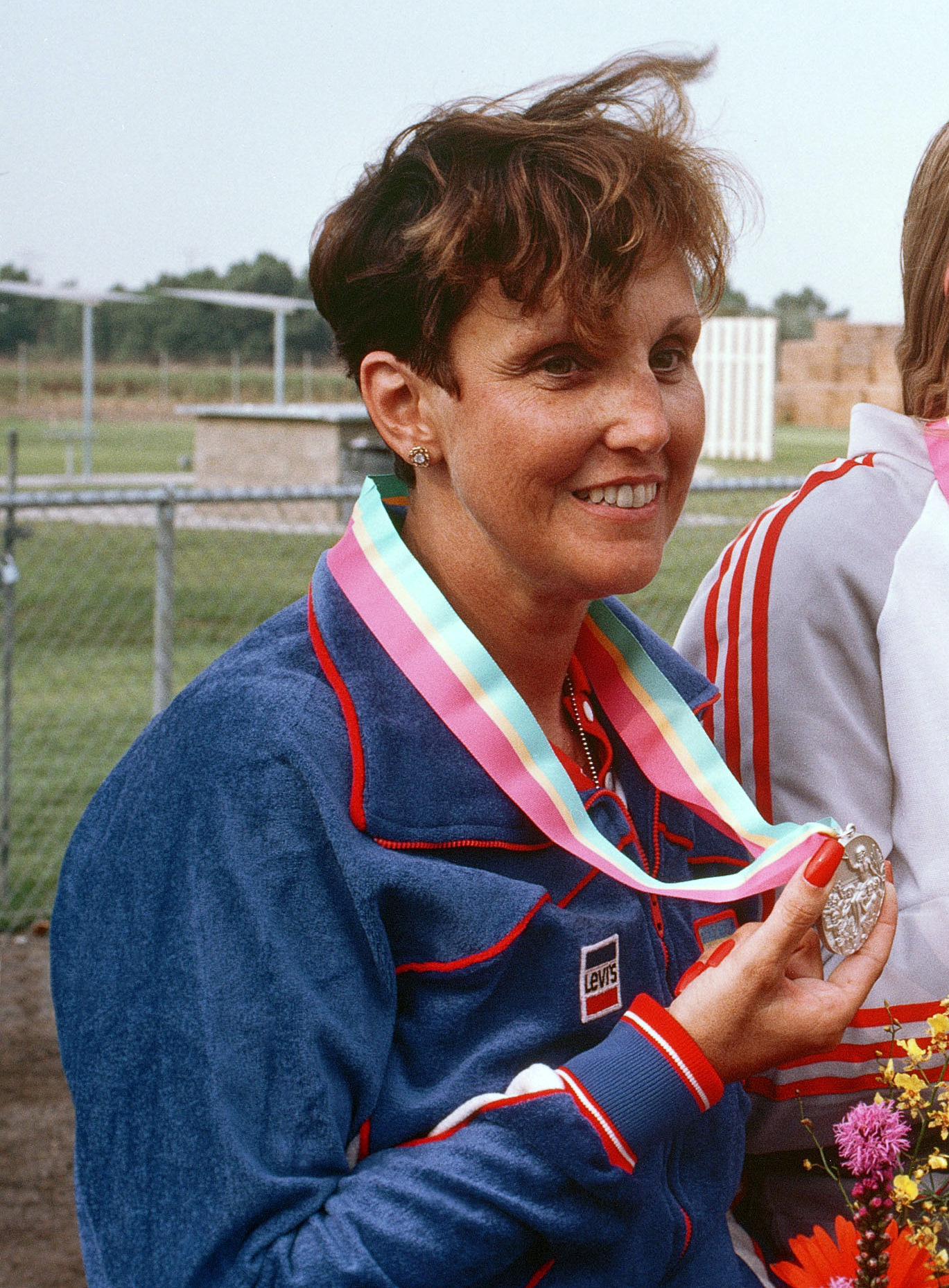
- Fox in 1984.

Personal information
- Full name: Ruby Ellen Fox
- Born: August 11, 1945 (age 80) Los Angeles, California, U.S.
Medal record
Women's shooting
Representing the United States
Olympic Games
Silver medal – second place	1984 Los Angeles	25 m pistol

Ruby Ellen Fox (born August 11, 1945, in Los Angeles, California) is a former American sports shooter and Olympic silver medalist. At the 1984 Summer Olympics in Los Angeles, California, she won a silver medal in the women's 25 metre pistol competition. At the 1988 Summer Olympics, she place 26th in the 25 metre pistol competition and tied for 22nd place in the 10 metre air pistol competition.
