= Britt-Marie Ellis =

Swedish sports shooter

Personal information
- Nationality: Swedish
- Born: 13 October 1958 (age 66); Norrköping, Sweden

Sport
- Sport: Sports shooting

Britt-Marie Ellis (born 13 October 1958) is a Swedish sports shooter. She competed at the 1988 Summer Olympics and the 1992 Summer Olympics.
