= Eszter Poljak =

Yugoslav sports shooter

Personal information
- Nationality: Yugoslav
- Born: 17 August 1952 (age 74)

Sport
- Sport: Sports shooting

Eszter Poljak
Medal record

Men's sport shooting

Representing Yugoslavia

European Championships
Bronze medal – third place	1989 Copenhagen	10 m air pistol

Eszter Poljak (born 17 August 1952) is a Yugoslav sports shooter. She competed at the 1988 Summer Olympics and the 1992 Summer Olympics.
