= Wang Lina (sport shooter) =

Chinese sport shooter (born 1971)

Wang Lina (born 8 July 1971) is a Chinese sport shooter who competed in the 1992 Summer Olympics.
