= Byambajavyn Altantsetseg =

Mongolian sports shooter (born 1962)

Personal information
- Nationality: Mongolian
- Born: 24 April 1962 (age 63)

Sport
- Sport: Sports shooting

Byambajavyn Altantsetseg (born 24 April 1962) is a Mongolian sports shooter. She competed at the 1988 Summer Olympics and the 1992 Summer Olympics.
