= Inna Rose =

Estonian sports shooter (born 1958)

Personal information
- Nationality: Estonian
- Citizenship: Estonian
- Born: 10 April 1958 (age 68) Tomsk, Russia
- Home town: Türi
- Education: Tallinn University

Sport
- Country: Estonia
- Sport: Sports shooting, target shooting
- Coached by: Rein Valdru, Jüri Talu

Inna Rose (born 10 April 1958) is an Estonian sports shooter. She competed in two events at the 1992 Summer Olympics.
