= Tânia Mara Fassoni-Giansante =

Brazilian sports shooter

Personal information
- Nationality: Brazilian
- Born: 11 May 1956 (age 69)

Sport
- Sport: Sports shooting

Tânia Mara Fassoni-Giansante (born 11 May 1956) is a Brazilian sports shooter. She competed at the 1988 Summer Olympics and the 1992 Summer Olympics.
