= Eva Suárez =

Spanish sports shooter

Personal information
- Nationality: Spanish
- Born: 21 May 1960 (age 64)

Sport
- Sport: Sports shooting

Eva Suárez (born 21 May 1960) is a Spanish sports shooter. She competed at the 1988 Summer Olympics and the 1992 Summer Olympics.
