= Nino Salukvadze =

Georgian sport shooter

Personal information
- Born: 1 February 1969 (age 57) Tbilisi, Georgian SSR, Soviet Union
- Height: 168 cm (5 ft 6 in)
Medal record
Women's shooting
Representing Georgia
Olympic Games
Bronze medal – third place	2008 Beijing	10 m Air Pistol
World Shooting Championships
Silver medal – second place	2002 Lahti	10 m Air Pistol
European Shooting Championships
Gold medal – first place	1993 Brno	25 m pistol Team
Silver medal – second place	1999 Bordeaux	25 m pistol Team
Silver medal – second place	2005 Talin	10 m Air Pistol
Silver medal – second place	2008 Winterthur	10 m Air Pistol
Silver medal – second place	2009 Prague	10 m Air Pistol
Bronze medal – third place	1996 Budapest	10 m Air Pistol
Bronze medal – third place	2001 Pont	10 m Air Pistol
Bronze medal – third place	2003 Plzen	25 m pistol Team
Representing Soviet Union
Olympic Games
Gold medal – first place	1988 Seoul	25 m Pistol
Silver medal – second place	1988 Seoul	10 m Air Pistol
World Shooting Championships
Gold medal – first place	1986 Suhl	25 m Air Pistol Team
Gold medal – first place	1987 Budapest	10 m Air Pistol Team
Gold medal – first place	1989 Saraevo	10 m Air Pistol
Gold medal – first place	1990 Moscow	25 m Air Pistol Team
Gold medal – first place	1990 Moscow	10 m Air Pistol Team
Gold medal – first place	1991 Stav	10 m Air Pistol Team
Silver medal – second place	1989 Saraevo	10 m Air Pistol Team
Bronze medal – third place	1986 Suhl	25 m Air Pistol
European Shooting Championships
Gold medal – first place	1989 Zagreb	25 m pistol
Gold medal – first place	1990 Arnhem	10 m pistol
Gold medal – first place	1991 Manchester	10 m Air Pistol Team
Bronze medal – third place	1991 Manchester	10 m Air Pistol

Nino Salukvadze (Georgian: ნინო სალუქვაძე; born 1 February 1969, in Tbilisi) is a Georgian sport shooter. She is a ten-time Olympian, the record for appearances by a female athlete and tying Canadian showjumper Ian Millar for the most for any athlete. Salukvadze has won medals on three occasions, while competing on three different Olympic teams – for the Soviet Union in 1988, then the Unified Team at Barcelona in 1992 after the collapse of the Soviet Union, and lastly for Georgia beginning in 1996.

At age 19 and competing for the Soviet Union at the 1988 Summer Olympics, she won a gold medal in the women's 25-metre sporting pistol competition and silver in the women's 10-metre air pistol competition. At the 2008 Summer Olympics, competing for Georgia, she added to her tally with a bronze medal, also in the 10-metre air pistol event.

== Career ==
=== 1988 Summer Olympics ===
Competing in the 1988 Summer Olympics in Seoul, Korea, Nino set the world record and won a gold medal in the 25-meter pistol for the Soviet Union. She also won the silver medal in the 10-meter air pistol.

=== 2008 Summer Olympics ===
Georgia and Russia were at war when Salukvadze competed in the women's 10-metre air pistol competition of the 2008 Summer Olympics with Russian shooter Natalia Paderina. After Salukvadze won the bronze and Paderina the silver, they shared a podium, hugged and shook hands, which was seen a peaceful gesture.

=== 2016 Summer Olympics ===
At the 2016 Summer Olympics, Nino and her son Tsotne Machavariani were the first mother-son duo to compete in the same Olympics, representing Georgia in the pistol events.

=== 2020 Summer Olympics ===
At age 52, Nino competed in her ninth Olympic Games at the 2020 Summer Olympics, becoming the first female athlete in history to do so. And ahead of her record-breaking appearance, Salukvadze was given the honor of being one of Georgia's flag bearers for the 2020 Summer Olympics Opening Ceremony, for the second time.

=== 2024 Summer Olympics ===
Nino competed in her tenth Olympic Games at age 55, at the shooting at the 2024 Summer Olympics, becoming the first female athlete in history to do so; she competed in the women’s 10m air pistol and 25m pistol events. She was also one of Georgia's flag bearers, for the third time, at the 2024 Summer Olympics Parade of Nations.

== Olympic results ==
Olympic results
Event	25 meter pistol	10 meter air pistol
1988 Seoul	1st (591+99)	2nd (390+97.9)
1992 Barcelona	5th (583+93)	10th (380)
1996 Atlanta	7th (586+91.6)	5th (385+99.0)
2000 Sydney	11th (579)	25th (376)
2004 Athens	8th (580+98.3)	10th (382)
2008 Beijing	16th (580)	3rd (386+101.4)
2012 London	15th (581)	33rd (376)
2016 Rio de Janeiro	6th (584+14)	34th (377)
2020 Tokyo	25th (578)	31st (567)
2024 Paris	40th (563)	38th (562)

== Records ==
Current world records held in 25 metre pistol
Junior Women	Individual	593	Nino Salukvadze (URS); Manu Bhaker (IND)	July 13, 1989; August 22, 2018	Zagreb (YUG); Jakarta (INA)

== Biographical Information ==
Highlights

Rank Event Year Location Result

=== Olympic Games ===
1 25m Pistol 1988 Seoul, KOR 690

2 10m Air Pistol 1988 Seoul, KOR 487.9

3 10m Air Pistol 2008 Beijing, CHN 487.4

5 10m Air Pistol 1996 Atlanta, GA, USA 484.0

5 25m Pistol 1992 Barcelona, ESP 676

6 25m Pistol 2016 Rio de Janeiro, BRA 14

7 25m Pistol 1996 Atlanta, GA, USA 677.6

8 25m Pistol 2004 Athens, GRE 678.3

10 10m Air Pistol 2004 Athens, GRE 382

10 10m Air Pistol 1992 Barcelona, ESP 380

11 25m Pistol 2000 Sydney, NSW, AUS 579

15 25m Pistol 2012 London, GBR 581

16 25m Pistol 2008 Beijing, CHN 580

25 25m Pistol 2020 Tokyo, JPN 578

25 10m Air Pistol 2000 Sydney, NSW, AUS 376

31 10m Air Pistol 2020 Tokyo, JPN 567

33 10m Air Pistol 2012 London, GBR 376

34 10m Air Pistol 2016 Rio de Janeiro, BRA 377

=== World Championships ===
1 10m Air Pistol Team 1991 Stavanger, NOR

1 10m Air Pistol Team 1990 Moscow, URS

1 25m Pistol Team 1990 Moscow, URS

1 10m Air Pistol 1989 Sarajevo, YUG 487.5

1 10m Air Pistol Team 1987 Budapest, HUN

1 25m Pistol Team 1986 Suhl, GDR

2 10m Air Pistol 2002 Lahti, FIN 484.9

2 10m Air Pistol Team 1989 Sarajevo, YUG

3 25m Pistol 1986 Suhl, GDR 686.0

4 25m Pistol 1998 Barcelona, ESP 682.9

5 Mixed 50m Pistol - Team (Mixed) 2022 Cairo, EGY 9

8 10m Air Pistol 2006 Zagreb, CRO 480.3

10 25m Pistol 2006 Zagreb, CRO 579

12 50m Pistol 2022 Cairo, EGY 510

12 Women's 25m Standard Pistol 2022 Cairo, EGY 558

13 25m Pistol 2002 Lahti, FIN 578

14 Mixed 25m Standard Pistol - Team (Mixed) 2022 Cairo, EGY 543

15 10m Air Pistol Team 2018 Changwon, KOR 764

27 25m Pistol 2014 Granada, ESP 576

31 10m Air Pistol 2022 Cairo, EGY 573

32 25m Pistol 2022 Cairo, EGY 578

38 10m Air Pistol 2014 Granada, ESP 377

40 10m Air Pistol Team 2022 Cairo, EGY 567

47 10m Air Pistol 2010 Munich, GER 378

50 25m Pistol 2018 Changwon, KOR 574

54 25m Pistol 2010 Munich, GER 574

64 10m Air Pistol 2018 Changwon, KOR 563

=== European Championships ===
2 10m Air Pistol 2009 Prague, CZE 484.4

2 10m Air Pistol 2008 Winterthur, SUI 485.8

2 10m Air Pistol 2005 Tallinn, EST 485.3

3 25m Pistol 2003 Plzen, CZE 678.3

3 10m Air Pistol 2001 Pontevedra, ESP 484.6

4 25m Pistol 2015 Maribor, SLO 5

4 25m Pistol 2005 Belgrade, SCG 783.4

4 10m Air Pistol 2002 Thessaloniki, GRE 480.8

4 10m Air Pistol 2000 Munich, GER 480.9

5 10m Air Pistol 2013 Odense, DEN 136.1

5 25m Pistol 2001 Zagreb, CRO 678.2

6 Mixed 50m Pistol - Team (Mixed) 2019 Bologna, ITA 169

6 25m Pistol 2009 Osijek, CRO 781.4

7 10m Air Pistol 2021 Osijek, CRO 135.6

8 25m Pistol 2007 Granada, ESP 775.7

8 10m Air Pistol 2003 Gothenburg, SWE 478.3

9 25m Pistol 2011 Belgrade, SRB 579

10 10m Air Pistol 2007 Deauville, FRA 381

11 25m Pistol 2017 Baku, AZE 579

12 10m Air Pistol 2015 Arnhem, NED 380

13 25m Pistol 2013 Osijek, CRO 578

14 Mixed 25m Standard Pistol - Team (Mixed) 2019 Bologna, ITA 547

16 10m Air Pistol 2006 Moscow, RUS 381.0

17 10m Air Pistol 2016 Gyor, HUN 378

18 10m Air Pistol 2010 Meraker, NOR 378

19 10m Air Pistol 2012 Vierumaki, FIN 380

21 10m Air Pistol 2011 Brescia, ITA 379

21 10m Air Pistol 2004 Gyor, HUN 377.0

22 25m Pistol 2019 Bologna, ITA 577

24 25m Pistol 2022 Wroclaw, POL 575

25 50m Pistol 2022 Wroclaw, POL 520

25 10m Air Pistol 2014 Moscow, RUS 377

26 25m Pistol 2021 Osijek, CRO 577

29 25m Standard Pistol 2022 Wroclaw, POL 555

30 10m Air Pistol 2020 Wroclaw, POL 568

30 10m Air Pistol 2018 Gyor, HUN 563

31 10m Air Pistol Team 2019 Osijek, CRO 750

35 10m Air Pistol 2019 Osijek, CRO 559

37 50m Pistol 2021 Osijek, CRO 521

38 10m Air Pistol Team 2018 Gyor, HUN 748

41 10m Air Pistol Team 2020 Wroclaw, POL 552

43 25m Standard Pistol 2021 Osijek, CRO 541

54 10m Air Pistol 2017 Maribor, SLO 367

DNS 10m Air Pistol Team 2021 Osijek, CRO DNS

=== European Games ===
- Shooting at the 2015 European Games
- Shooting at the 2019 European Games
- Shooting at the 2023 European Games

3 Mixed 50m Pistol - Team (Mixed) 2019 Minsk, BLR 87.7

5 10m Air Pistol Team 2019 Minsk, BLR 377

14 10m Air Pistol Team 2015 Baku, AZE 470

16 10m Air Pistol 2015 Baku, AZE 379

20 25m Pistol 2015 Baku, AZE 573

25 25m Pistol 2019 Minsk, BLR 569

26 10m Air Pistol 2019 Minsk, BLR 562

== See also ==
- List of athletes with the most appearances at Olympic Games

Olympic Games
Preceded by Ramaz Nozadze	Flagbearer for Georgia; London 2012	Succeeded by Avtandil Tchrikishvili
Preceded by Avtandil Tchrikishvili	Flagbearer for Georgia (with Lasha Talakhadze); Tokyo 2020, Paris 2024	Succeeded by Incumbent
