= Agathi Kassoumi =

Greek sport shooter

Agi Kassoumi
Personal information
- Full name: Agathi Kassoumi
- Born: 13 July 1966 (age 59) Athens, Greece
Medal record
Women's shooting
Representing Greece
Mediterranean Games
Silver medal – second place	2013 Mersin	25 m pistol

Agathi "Agi" Kassoumi (Greek: Αγαθη "Αγη" Κασούμη, born 13 July 1966) is a Greek pistol shooter who has competed at six Olympic Games between 1984 and 2004. Her best position was 11th in the 25 metre pistol at the 1992 Olympics.

She is the second Greek, after sailor Anastasios Bountouris, to compete at six Olympic Games.

She was named the Greek Female Athlete of the Year for 1984.

== See also ==
- List of athletes with the most appearances at Olympic Games
