= ISSF 25 meter pistol =

International Shooting Sports Federation (ISSF) shooting event

25 meter pistol
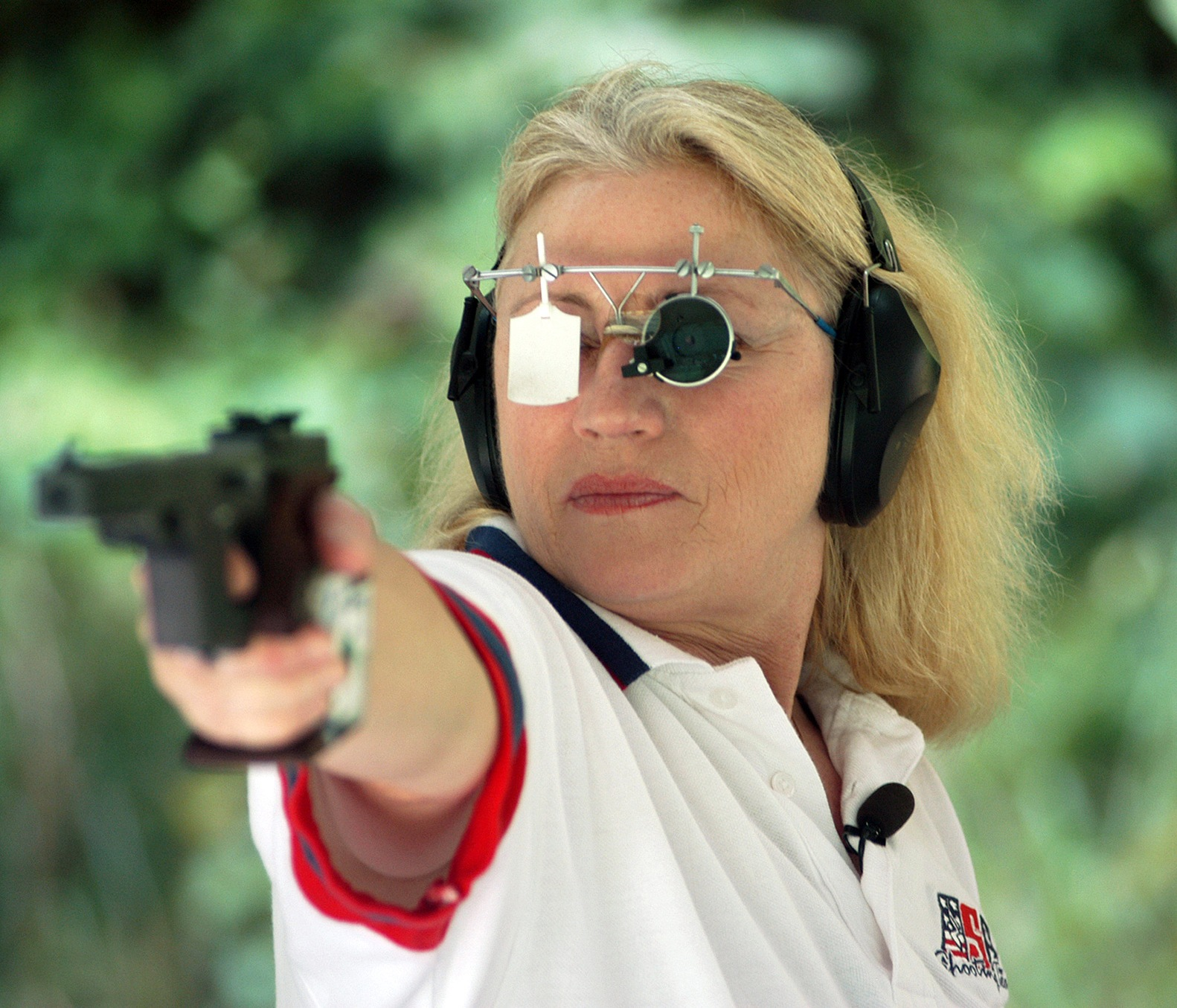

Women
- Number of shots: 2x30 + 25 + dueling for medal series by series
- Olympic Games: Since 1984
- World Championships: Since 1966
- Abbreviation: SP

25 meter pistol, formerly and unofficially still often known as sport pistol, is one of the ISSF shooting events. It was devised as a women's event in the 1960s, based upon the rules of 25 meter center-fire pistol but shot with a .22-caliber sport pistol instead of the larger-caliber guns men used. As with all ISSF pistol disciplines, all firing must be done with one hand, unsupported.

In 1984, female shooting competitions began in the Olympic Games, and so sport pistol made its way into the Olympic program. Internationally, it is still only shot by women and juniors, while men have center-fire pistols instead. However, in many countries, there are also male classes in 25 meter pistol on the national level and lower.

As 25 meter pistol is Olympic, it involves shooting a final, which the center-fire event does not. The top eight contestants reach the final, which consists of four additional rapid-fire stage series of 5 shots each. The final score is added to the qualification score.

Most shooters excelling in 25 meter pistol also compete at the same level in 10 meter air pistol, a similar precision event.

== World Championships, Women ==
Year	Place	Gold	Silver	Bronze
1966	(West Germany) Wiesbaden	Nina Rasskazova (URS)	Alexandra Savina (URS)	Susan Swallow (GBR)
1970	(United States) Phoenix	Nina Stoliarova (URS)	Barbara Hile (USA)	Karin Fitzner (FRG)
1974	(Switzerland) Thun	Nina Stoliarova (URS)	Galina Zarikova (URS)	Zinaida Simonian (URS)
1978	(South Korea) Seoul	Kimberly Dyer (USA)	Brida Beccarelli (SUI)	Helvi Leppamaeki (FIN)
1982	(Venezuela) Caracas	Palma Balogh (HUN)	Inna Rose (URS)	Jianmin Gao (CHN)
1986	(East Germany) Suhl	Marina Dobrantcheva (URS)	Irina Kotcherova (URS)	Nino Salukvadze (URS)
1990	(Soviet Union) Moscow	Marina Logvinenko (URS)	Yauheniya Haluza (URS)	Duihong Li (CHN)
1994	(Italy) Milan	Soon Hee Boo (KOR)	Julita Macur (POL)	Duihong Li (CHN)
1998	(Spain) Barcelona	Yeqing Cai (CHN)	Irada Ashumova (AZE)	Marina Logvinenko (RUS)
2002	(Finland) Lahti	Munkhbayar Dorjsuren (GER)	Irada Ashumova (AZE)	Ying Chen (CHN)
2006	(Croatia) Zagreb	Ying Chen (CHN)	Fengji Fei (CHN)	Otryadyn Gündegmaa (MGL)
2010	(Germany) Munich	Kira Klimova (RUS)	Zorana Arunović (SRB)	Lenka Maruskova (CZE)
2014	(Spain) Granada	Jingjing Zhang (CHN)	Kim Jang-mi (KOR)	Renáta Tobai-Sike (HUN)
2018	(South Korea) Changwon	Olena Kostevych (UKR)	Vitalina Batsarashkina (RUS)	Doreen Vennekamp (GER)
2022	(Egypt) New Administrative Capital	Kim Jang-mi (KOR)	Chen Yan (CHN)	Doreen Vennekamp (GER)

== World Championships, Women Team ==
Year	Place	Gold	Silver	Bronze
1970	(United States) Phoenix	(United States) United States; Sally Carroll; Lucile Chambliss; Barbara Hile	(Soviet Union) Soviet Union; Nadezda Ibragimova; Nina Rasskazova; Nina Stoliarova	(West Germany) West Germany; Ortrud Feickert; Karin Fitzner; Ruth Kasten
1974	(Switzerland) Thun	(Soviet Union) Soviet Union; Galina Zarikova; Zinaida Simonian; Nina Stoliarova	(Czechoslovakia) Czechoslovakia; Tereza Bohinska; Bedriska Hykova; Katarina Pastorova	(Australia) Australia; Judith Harrison; Enid Newton; Gloria Vause
1978	(South Korea) Seoul	(Denmark) Denmark; Kirsten Broge; Bonnie Bruun; Aase Havsteen	(Australia) Australia; Julie Aitken; Patricia Dench; Lynne Uden	(United States) United States; Sally Carroll; Kimberly Dyer; Ruby Fox
1982	(Venezuela) Caracas	(Soviet Union) Soviet Union; Marina Dobrantcheva; Inna Rose; Auksne Treinite	(Hungary) Hungary; Palma Balogh; Marta Kotroczo; Gabriella Kanyai	(China) China; Jianmin Gao; Zhifang Wen; Cui Qing Yang
1986	(East Germany) Suhl	(Soviet Union) Soviet Union; Marina Dobrantcheva; Irina Kotcherova; Nino Salukvadze	(France) France; Martine Guepin; Evelyne Manchon; Corine Serra-Tosio	(Albania) Albania; Diana Mata; Emanuela Delilaj; Edlira Shyti
1990	(Soviet Union) Moscow	(Soviet Union) Soviet Union; Yauheniya Haluza; Marina Logvinenko; Nino Salukvadze	(Sweden) Sweden; Kerstin Bodin; Britt Marie Ellis; Chris Kajd	(China) China; Haiying Liu; Duihong Li; Meifang Qian
1994	(Italy) Milan	(China) China; Xiaoping Fan; Duihong Li; Lina Wang	(South Korea) South Korea; Soon Hee Boo; Sun Bok Lee; Jung Hee Park	(Belarus) Belarus; Zhanna Shitik; Yauheniya Haluza; Yuliya Siniak
1998	(Spain) Barcelona	(China) China; Yeqing Cai; Luna Tao; Yi Sun	(South Korea) South Korea; Eun Kyung Shin; Soon Hee Boo; Joo Hyung Seo	(Mongolia) Mongolia; Munkhbayar Dorjsuren; Oyun Davaajantsan; Gundegmaa Otryad
2002	(Finland) Lahti	(China) China; Luna Tao; Ying Chen; Duihong Li	(Russia) Russia; Irina Dolgatcheva; Galina Beliaeva; Svetlana Smirnova	(United States) United States; Elizabeth Callahan; Rebecca Snyder; Sandra Uptagrafft
2006	(Croatia) Zagreb	(China) China; Ying Chen; Fengji Fei; Duihong Li	(Belarus) Belarus; Liudmila Chabatar; Zhanna Shapialevich; Yauheniya Haluza	(Germany) Germany; Munkhbayar Dorjsuren; Stefanie Thurmann; Claudia Verdicchio
2010	(Germany) Munich	(Russia) Russia; Yulia Alipova; Kira Klimova; Galina Beliaeva	(Serbia) Serbia; Zorana Arunović; Jasna Šekarić; Jelena Arunović	(Czech Republic) Czech Republic; Lenka Maruskova; Michaela Musilová; Petra Hykova
2014	(Spain) Granada	(China) China; Jingjing Zhang; Chen Ying; Qian Wei	(Mongolia) Mongolia; Munkzul Tsogbadrah; Otryadyn Gündegmaa; Bayartsetseg Tumurchudur	(South Korea) South Korea; Lee Jung-eun; Hye Jung Kwak; Kim Jang-mi
2018	(South Korea) Changwon	(China) China; Jiang Ranxin; Lin Yuemei; Yao Yushi	(South Korea) South Korea; Lee Jung-eun; Kim Min-jung; Kwak Jung-hye	(Germany) Germany; Monika Karsch; Doreen Vennekamp; Michelle Skeries
2022	(Egypt) New Administrative Capital	China; Chen Yan; Liu Rui; Xiao Jiaruixuan	India; Manu Bhaker; Abhidnya Ashok Patil; Rhythm Sangwan	Germany; Monika Karsch; Michelle Skeries; Doreen Vennekamp

== World Championships, total medals ==
Rank	Nation	Gold	Silver	Bronze	Total
1	Soviet Union	9	6	2	17
2	China	6	1	6	13
3	United States	2	1	2	5
4	Russia	2	1	1	4
5	South Korea	1	2	0	3
6	Hungary	1	1	0	2
7	Germany	1	0	1	2
8	Denmark	1	0	0	1
9	Azerbaijan	0	2	0	2
9	Serbia	0	2	0	2
11	Australia	0	1	1	2
11	Belarus	0	1	1	2
13	Czechoslovakia	0	1	0	1
13	France	0	1	0	1
13	Poland	0	1	0	1
13	Sweden	0	1	0	1
13	Switzerland	0	1	0	1
18	Czech Republic	0	0	2	2
18	Mongolia	0	0	2	2
18	West Germany	0	0	2	2
21	Albania	0	0	1	1
21	Finland	0	0	1	1
21	Great Britain	0	0	1	1
Totals (23 entries)		23	23	23	69

== Current world records ==
Current world records in 25 metre pistol
Women (ISSF)	Qualification	594	Diana Iorgova (BUL); Tao Luna (CHN)	May 31, 1994; August 23, 2002	Milan (ITA); Munich (GER)
Women (ISSF)	Final	40	Veronika Major (HUN)	February 24, 2019	New Delhi (IND)
Women (ISSF)	Teams	1768	China (Chen, Li, Tao)	October 4, 2002	Busan (KOR)
Women (CISM)	Individual	590	Li Duihong (CHN); Maria Grozdeva (BUL); Stephanie Thurmann (GER); Zhang Mengyuan (CHN); Doreen Vennekamp (GER)	1993; 1996; 2015; June 2, 2018; June 2, 2018	(NOR) (SWE) (KOR); Thun (SUI); Thun (SUI)
Junior Women	Individual	593	Nino Salukvadze (URS); Manu Bhaker (IND)	July 13, 1989; August 22, 2018	Zagreb (YUG); Jakarta (INA)
Junior Women	Final	39	Anna Korakaki (GRE)	October 7, 2016	Bologna (ITA)
Junior Women	Teams	1736	China (Feng, Chen, Zhou)	November 12, 2019	Doha (QAT)
Junior Men	Individual	590	Pavlo Korostylov (UKR); Alexander Petrov (RUS); Pavlo Korostylov (UKR)	July 31, 2013; June 14, 2016; June 27, 2017	Osijek (CRO); Tallinn (EST); Suhl (GER)
Junior Men	Teams	1747	India (Sidhu U., Sidhu V., Sandhu)	June 27, 2018	Suhl (GER)

== Olympic and World Champions ==
25 meter pistol for women was introduced in the 1984 Summer Olympics. In its first eight instalments, one shooter has succeeded in winning two gold medals: Mariya Grozdeva from Bulgaria. The current Olympic gold medallist is Anna Korakaki from Greece.

=== Women ===
Year	Venue	Individual	Team		
1966	Wiesbaden	Nina Rasskazova (URS)			
1970	Phoenix	Nina Stoliarova (URS)	United States		
1974	Thun	Nina Stoliarova (URS)	Soviet Union		
1978	Seoul	Kimberly Dyer (USA)	Denmark		
1982	Caracas	Palma Balogh (HUN)	Soviet Union		
1984	Los Angeles	Linda Thom (CAN)			
1986	Suhl	Marina Dobrantcheva (URS)	Soviet Union		
1988	Seoul	Nino Salukvadze (URS)			
1990	Moscow	Marina Logvinenko (URS)	Soviet Union	Junior Women	
1992	Barcelona	Marina Logvinenko (EUN)		Individual	Team
1994	Milan	Boo Soon-hee (KOR)	China	Sławomira Szpek (POL)	Germany
1996	Atlanta	Li Duihong (CHN)			
1998	Barcelona	Cai Yeqing (CHN)	China	Vlatka Pervan (CRO)	Poland
2000	Sydney	Mariya Grozdeva (BUL)			
2002	Lahti	Munkhbayar Dorjsuren (GER)	China	Fei Fengji (CHN)	China
2004	Athens	Mariya Grozdeva (BUL)			
2006	Zagreb	Chen Ying (CHN)	China	Zorana Arunović (SRB)	China
2008	Beijing	Chen Ying (CHN)			
2010	Munich	Kira Klimova (RUS)	Russia	Olga Nikulina (RUS)	Russia
2012	London	Kim Jang-Mi (KOR)			
2014	Granada	Jingjing Zhang (CHN)	China	Mathilde Lamolle (FRA)	China
2016	Rio de Janeiro	Anna Korakaki (GRE)			
2018	Changwon	Olena Kostevych (UKR)	China	Wang Xiaoyu (CHN)	South Korea

=== Junior Men ===
Year	Venue	Individual	Team
1994	Milan	Anatolie Corovai (MDA)	Moldova
1998	Barcelona	Pavel Kopp (SVK)	Russia
2002	Lahti	Denis Kulakov (RUS)	Kazakhstan
2006	Zagreb	Leonid Yekimov (RUS)	Russia
2010	Munich	Florian Fouquet (FRA)	China
2014	Granada	Alexander Chichkov (USA)	Mongolia
2018	Changwon	Udhayveer Sidhu (IND)	India
