= Anke Schumann =

German sport shooter (born 1959)

Anke Schumann born Anke Völker (born 21 July 1959) is a German sport shooter who competed in the 1988 Summer Olympics, in the 1996 Summer Olympics, and in the 2000 Summer Olympics.
