= Shooting at the 1988 Summer Olympics =

Shooting at the Games of the XXIV Olympiad

The shooting competitions at the 1988 Summer Olympics took place in Seoul, South Korea. Competitions were held in a total of thirteen events—seven men's events, four women's events, and two events open to both genders. It was the first games for the 10 metre air pistol events, and the last for the 50 metre running target event, later replaced by 10 metre running target. It was also the first time the Olympic shooting competitions included finals for the top eight (in some cases six) competitors.

== Medal summary ==
=== Medal table ===
| Rank | Nation | Gold | Silver | Bronze | Total |
|---|---|---|---|---|---|
| 1 | Soviet Union | 4 | 1 | 6 | 11 |
| 2 | Yugoslavia | 2 | 0 | 1 | 3 |
| 3 | West Germany | 1 | 1 | 1 | 3 |
| 4 | Bulgaria | 1 | 1 | 0 | 2 |
| 4 | Czechoslovakia | 1 | 1 | 0 | 2 |
| 4 | East Germany | 1 | 1 | 0 | 2 |
| 4 | Great Britain | 1 | 1 | 0 | 2 |
| 8 | Norway | 1 | 0 | 0 | 1 |
| 8 | Romania | 1 | 0 | 0 | 1 |
| 10 | China | 0 | 1 | 1 | 2 |
| 11 | Chile | 0 | 1 | 0 | 1 |
| 11 | France | 0 | 1 | 0 | 1 |
| 11 | Japan | 0 | 1 | 0 | 1 |
| 11 | South Korea | 0 | 1 | 0 | 1 |
| 11 | Sweden | 0 | 1 | 0 | 1 |
| 11 | United States | 0 | 1 | 0 | 1 |
| 17 | Hungary | 0 | 0 | 2 | 2 |
| 18 | Belgium | 0 | 0 | 1 | 1 |
| 18 | Spain | 0 | 0 | 1 | 1 |
| Totals (19 entries) | | 13 | 13 | 13 | 39 |

=== Men's events ===
| Games | Gold | Silver | Bronze |
|---|---|---|---|
| 50 metre rifle three positions | Malcolm Cooper; Great Britain | Alister Allan; Great Britain | Kirill Ivanov; Soviet Union |
| 50 metre rifle prone | Miroslav Varga; Czechoslovakia | Cha Young-chul; South Korea | Attila Záhonyi; Hungary |
| 10 metre air rifle | Goran Maksimović; Yugoslavia | Nicolas Berthelot; France | Johann Riederer; West Germany |
| 50 metre pistol | Sorin Babii; Romania | Ragnar Skanåker; Sweden | Igor Basinski; Soviet Union |
| 25 metre rapid fire pistol | Afanasijs Kuzmins; Soviet Union | Ralf Schumann; East Germany | Zoltán Kovács; Hungary |
| 10 metre air pistol | Tanyu Kiryakov; Bulgaria | Erich Buljung; United States | Xu Haifeng; China |
| 50 metre running target | Tor Heiestad; Norway | Huang Shiping; China | Gennadi Avramenko; Soviet Union |

=== Women's events ===
| Games | Gold | Silver | Bronze |
|---|---|---|---|
| 50 metre rifle three positions | Silvia Sperber; West Germany | Vesela Letcheva; Bulgaria | Valentina Cherkasova; Soviet Union |
| 10 metre air rifle | Irina Shilova; Soviet Union | Silvia Sperber; West Germany | Anna Maloukhina; Soviet Union |
| 25 metre pistol | Nino Salukvadze; Soviet Union | Tomoko Hasegawa; Japan | Jasna Šekarić; Yugoslavia |
| 10 metre air pistol | Jasna Šekarić; Yugoslavia | Nino Salukvadze; Soviet Union | Marina Dobrantcheva; Soviet Union |

=== Mixed events ===
| Games | Gold | Silver | Bronze |
|---|---|---|---|
| Trap | Dmitry Monakov; Soviet Union | Miloslav Bednařík; Czechoslovakia | Frans Peeters; Belgium |
| Skeet | Axel Wegner; East Germany | Alfonso de Iruarrizaga; Chile | Jorge Guardiola; Spain |

== Participating nations ==
A total of 396 shooters, 285 men and 111 women, from 66 nations competed at the Seoul Games:

- Argentina (3)
- Australia (12)
- Austria (11)
- Belgium (6)
- Brazil (4)
- Bulgaria (6)
- Canada (13)
- Chile (1)
- China (20)
- Chinese Taipei (3)
- Colombia (3)
- Costa Rica (1)
- Cyprus (1)
- Czechoslovakia (14)
- Denmark (6)
- East Germany (15)
- Ecuador (2)

- Egypt (2)
- Finland (9)
- France (19)
- Great Britain (8)
- Greece (2)
- Guatemala (1)
- Hong Kong (1)
- Hungary (15)
- India (1)
- Indonesia (1)
- Israel (2)
- Italy (13)
- Japan (14)
- Kenya (1)
- Liechtenstein (1)
- Luxembourg (2)

- Malaysia (1)
- Mexico (3)
- Monaco (1)
- Mongolia (3)
- Nepal (1)
- Netherlands (5)
- Netherlands Antilles (1)
- New Zealand (4)
- Norway (6)
- Oman (1)
- Peru (3)
- Poland (6)
- Portugal (2)
- Puerto Rico (2)
- Qatar (1)
- Romania (3)
- San Marino (2)

- Saudi Arabia (1)
- Singapore (1)
- South Korea (22)
- Soviet Union (23)
- Spain (8)
- Sri Lanka (2)
- Sweden (15)
- Switzerland (9)
- Thailand (3)
- Turkey (2)
- United States (24)
- Virgin Islands (1)
- Vietnam (1)
- West Germany (18)
- Yugoslavia (6)
- Zimbabwe (2)
