= Sévin (surname) =

Sévin and its variants Sevin, Saint-Sevin, and de Sévin are a surname of French origins. Notable people with the surname include:

- Hector Sévin (1852–1916), French Roman Catholic Cardinal
- Michelle Sévin (born 1955), French para table tennis player
- Joseph M. X. de Sévin (1894–1963), French military officer
- Charles Sevin de Quincy (1660–1738), French artillery general and historian
- Jacques Sevin (1882–1951), French Jesuit
- Jo Ann Sevin (born 1977), American sports shooter
- L. J. Sevin (1930–2015), American businessman
- Joseph-Barnabé Saint-Sevin dit L'Abbé le Fils (1727–1803), French composer and violinist
- Philippe Saint-Sevin (1698–1777), French cellist
- Pierre Saint-Sevin (1695–1768), French cellist and composer
