= Arthur Guyot de Salins =

Arthur de Salins
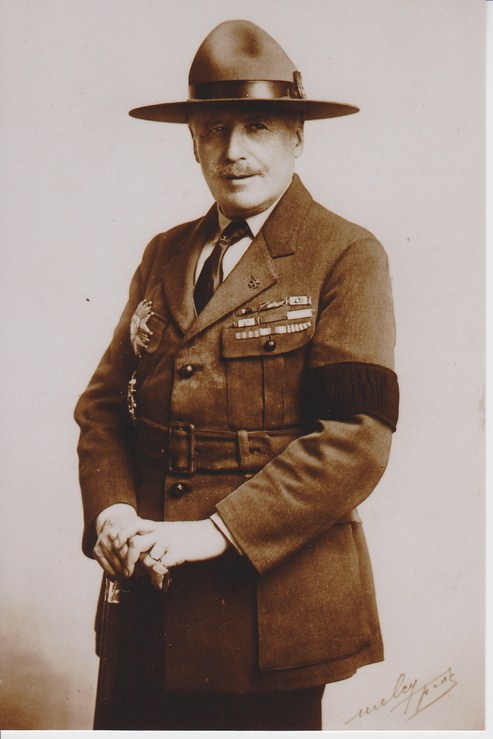
- Born: Arthur Joseph Marie Guyot d'Asnières de Salins; 3 December 1857; Auray, France
- Died: 11 August 1936 (aged 78); Carnac, France
- Military career
- Allegiance: French
- Rank: General
- Conflicts: First World War
- Awards: Second Chief Scout of the Scouts de France
- Other work: One of the founders of Scouting in France

General Arthur Joseph Marie Guyot d'Asnières de Salins (3 December 1857 - 11 August 1936) was a French military officer of the First World War, known as "the conqueror of Douaumont" in 1916, best known for being one of the founders of Scouting in France along with Jacques Sevin, the canon Cornette, Paul Coze and Édouard de Macedo. He was second Chief Scout of the Scouts de France (created in 1920) from 1922 to his death in 1936.
