= Édouard de Macedo =

Co-founder of Scouting in France (1900–1965)

Édouard de Macedo TOSD
- Born: 1900
- Died: 1965 (aged 64–65); Brazil
- Known for: One of the founders of Scouting in France

Édouard de Macedo (1900? – 1965 in Brazil) was one of the founders of Scouting in France along with Jacques Sevin, Arthur de Salins, Paul Coze and Canon Antoine-Louis Cornette. He served as Federal Commissioner and National Rover Commissioner of the Scouts de France, and later was named President of the Escoteiros Católicos do Brasil by Cardinal Sebastiaõ Leme da Silveira Cintra of Rio de Janeiro, receiving the blessing of Father Leovigildo Franca.
