= Shooting at the 1996 Summer Olympics – Women's 10 metre air pistol =

Sports shooting at the Olympics

Women's 10 metre air pistol at the Games of the XXVI Olympiad
- Venue: Wolf Creek Shooting Complex
- Date: 21 July 1996
- Competitors: 41 from 26 nations
- Winning score: 490.1 (OR)

Medalists
| 1st place, gold medalist(s) | | Olga Klochneva | Russia |
| 2nd place, silver medalist(s) | | Marina Logvinenko | Russia |
| 3rd place, bronze medalist(s) | | Mariya Grozdeva | Bulgaria |

Women's 10 metre air pistol was one of the fifteen shooting events at the 1996 Summer Olympics. Olga Klochneva won the event on a new Olympic record, and the defending champion, Marina Logvinenko, completed the Russian double by defeating Mariya Grozdeva in a shoot-off for the silver medal.

== Qualification round ==
| Rank | Athlete | Country | Score | Notes |
|---|---|---|---|---|
| 1 | Marina Logvinenko | Russia | 390 | Q OR |
| 2 | Olga Klochneva | Russia | 389 | Q |
| 3 | Mariya Grozdeva | Bulgaria | 389 | Q |
| 4 | Nino Salukvadze | Georgia | 385 | Q |
| 5 | Jasna Šekarić | FR Yugoslavia | 384 | Q |
| 6 | Galina Belyayeva | Kazakhstan | 384 | Q |
| 7 | Yuliya Bondareva | Kazakhstan | 383 | Q |
| 8 | Lalita Milshina | Belarus | 382 | Q (4th: 96; 3rd: 96; 2nd: 98) |
| 9 | Lee Hyo-suk | South Korea | 382 | (4th: 96; 3rd: 96; 2nd: 95) |
| 10 | Irada Ashumova | Azerbaijan | 381 | |
| 10 | Yulia Sinyak | Belarus | 381 | |
| 10 | Mirela Skoko | Croatia | 381 | |
| 10 | Diana Jorgova | Bulgaria | 381 | |
| 14 | Lu Fang | China | 380 | |
| 15 | Boo Soon-hee | South Korea | 379 | |
| 15 | Yoko Inada | Japan | 379 | |
| 15 | Li Duihong | China | 379 | |
| 15 | Susanne Meyerhoff | Denmark | 379 | |
| 19 | Maria Pilar Fernandez | Spain | 378 | |
| 19 | Michela Suppo | Italy | 378 | |
| 21 | Dorjsürengiin Mönkhbayar | Mongolia | 377 | |
| 21 | Enkelejda Shehu | Albania | 377 | |
| 23 | Annemarie Forder | Australia | 376 | |
| 23 | Majbritt Hjortshøj | Denmark | 376 | |
| 23 | Carol Page | Great Britain | 376 | |
| 23 | Barbara Stizzoli | Italy | 376 | |
| 27 | Julita Macur | Poland | 375 | |
| 27 | Anke Völker | Germany | 375 | |
| 29 | Cristina Gallo | Argentina | 374 | |
| 30 | Otryadyn Gündegmaa | Mongolia | 372 | |
| 30 | Rebecca Snyder | United States | 372 | |
| 32 | Lorena Guado | Argentina | 371 | |
| 32 | Jo Ann Sevin | United States | 371 | |
| 34 | Marija Mladenović | FR Yugoslavia | 370 | |
| 34 | Carol Tomcala | Australia | 370 | |
| 36 | Nino Uchadze | Georgia | 369 | |
| 37 | Regina Jirkalova | Czech Republic | 364 | |
| 38 | Djana Mata | Albania | 363 | |
| 39 | Margarita de Falconí | Ecuador | 361 | |
| 39 | Nadia Marchi | San Marino | 361 | |
| 41 | Jenny Schuverer | Panama | 354 | |

OR Olympic record – Q Qualified for final

== Final ==
| Rank | Athlete | Qual | Final | Total | Shoot-off | Notes |
|---|---|---|---|---|---|---|
| 1st place, gold medalist(s) | Olga Klochneva (RUS) | 389 | 101.1 | 490.1 | | OR |
| 2nd place, silver medalist(s) | Marina Logvinenko (RUS) | 390 | 98.5 | 488.5 | 10.1 | |
| 3rd place, bronze medalist(s) | Mariya Grozdeva (BUL) | 389 | 99.5 | 488.5 | 9.9 | |
| 4 | Jasna Šekarić (YUG) | 384 | 103.1 | 487.1 | | |
| 5 | Nino Salukvadze (GEO) | 385 | 99.0 | 484.0 | | |
| 6 | Galina Belyayeva (KAZ) | 384 | 97.7 | 481.7 | | |
| 7 | Yuliya Bondareva (KAZ) | 383 | 96.3 | 479.3 | | |
| 8 | Lalita Milshina (BLR) | 382 | 97.1 | 479.1 | | |

OR Olympic record

== Sources ==
- Olympic Report Atlanta 1996 Volume III: The Competition Results (PDF).
