= Shooting at the 2000 Summer Olympics – Women's 10 metre air pistol =

Sports shooting at the Olympics

Women's 10 metre air pistol at the Games of the XXVII Olympiad
- Venue: Sydney International Shooting Centre
- Date: 17 September 2000
- Competitors: 45 from 32 nations
- Winning score: 488.2

Medalists
1st place, gold medalist(s)		Tao Luna	China
2nd place, silver medalist(s)		Jasna Šekarić	FR Yugoslavia
3rd place, bronze medalist(s)		Annemarie Forder	Australia

The women's 10 metre air pistol competition at the 2000 Summer Olympics was held on 17 September. Tao Luna equalled the Olympic record of 390 points in the qualification round, and won 1.7 points ahead of Jasna Šekarić. The host nation won the bronze medal through Annemarie Forder.

== Records ==
Prior to this competition, the existing World and Olympic records were as follows.

Qualification records
World record	Svetlana Smirnova (RUS)	393	Munich, Germany	23 May 1998
Olympic record	Marina Logvinenko (RUS)	390	Atlanta, United States	21 July 1996

Final records
World record	Ren Jie (CHN)	493.5 (390+103.5)	Munich, Germany	22 May 1999
Olympic record	Olga Klochneva (RUS)	490.1	Atlanta, United States	21 July 1996

== Qualification round ==
Rank	Athlete	Country	Score	Notes
1	Tao Luna	China	390	Q EOR
2	Jasna Šekarić	FR Yugoslavia	388	Q
3	Dina Aspandiyarova	Kazakhstan	388	Q
4	Olga Kuznetsova	Russia	386	Q
5	Annemarie Forder	Australia	385	Q
6	Svetlana Smirnova	Russia	384	Q
7	Yoko Inada	Japan	383	Q
8	Michiko Fukushima	Japan	383	Q
9	Yuliya Bondareva	Kazakhstan	382	
9	Otryadyn Gündegmaa	Mongolia	382	
11	Viktoria Chaika	Belarus	381	
11	Lalita Yauhleuskaya	Belarus	381	
11	Adriana Rendón	Colombia	381	
11	Monica Rundqvist	Sweden	381	
11	Margarita Tarradell	Cuba	381	
16	Hebatallah El Wazan	Egypt	379	
16	Maria Pilar Fernandez	Spain	379	
16	Ren Jie	China	379	
16	Mirosława Sagun	Poland	379	
16	Song Ji-yeong	South Korea	379	
21	Carmen Malo	Ecuador	378	
21	Djana Mata	Albania	378	
21	Anke Schumann	Germany	378	
24	Boo Soon-hee	South Korea	377	
25	Karen Hansen	Denmark	376	
25	Nino Salukvadze	Georgia	376	
25	Rebecca Snyder	United States	376	
28	Christina Cassidy	United States	375	
28	Linda Ryan	Australia	375	
28	Nino Uchadze	Georgia	375	
31	Ruwani Abeymanne	Sri Lanka	374	
32	Agathi Kassoumi	Greece	373	
32	Irina Maharani	Malaysia	373	
32	Carmen Meininger	Germany	373	
35	Susanne Meyerhoff	Denmark	372	
36	Luisa Maida	El Salvador	368	
36	Dorjsürengiin Mönkhbayar	Mongolia	368	
38	Mariya Grozdeva	Bulgaria	367	
39	Tania Corrigan	New Zealand	366	
39	Kim Eagles	Canada	366	
39	María Gabriela Franco	Venezuela	366	
42	Diana Iorgova	Bulgaria	365	
43	Manijeh Kazemi	Iran	362	
44	Shirley Ng	Singapore	359	
45	Irada Ashumova	Azerbaijan	229	DNF

DNF Did not finish – EOR Equalled Olympic record – Q Qualified for final

== Final ==
Rank	Athlete	Qual	Final	Total	Shoot-off
1st place, gold medalist(s)	Tao Luna (CHN)	390	98.2	488.2	
2nd place, silver medalist(s)	Jasna Šekarić (YUG)	388	98.5	486.5	
3rd place, bronze medalist(s)	Annemarie Forder (AUS)	385	99.0	484.0	
4	Svetlana Smirnova (RUS)	384	99.7	483.7	?
5	Michiko Fukushima (JPN)	383	100.7	483.7	?
6	Dina Aspandiyarova (KAZ)	388	95.7	483.7	?
7	Olga Kuznetsova (RUS)	386	96.4	482.4	
8	Yoko Inada (JPN)	383	98.2	481.2	

== Sources ==
- Official Report of the XXVII Olympiad — Shooting (PDF).
