= Sevin =

Sevin may refer to:

- Sevin (given name), a Turkish feminine given name
- A commercial version of carbaryl (insecticide)
- Sevin (rapper), an American Christian hip hop musician
- Sévin (surname), a French surname

== See also ==
- Seven (disambiguation)
