= Olga Kuznetsova (sport shooter) =

Russian sport shooter

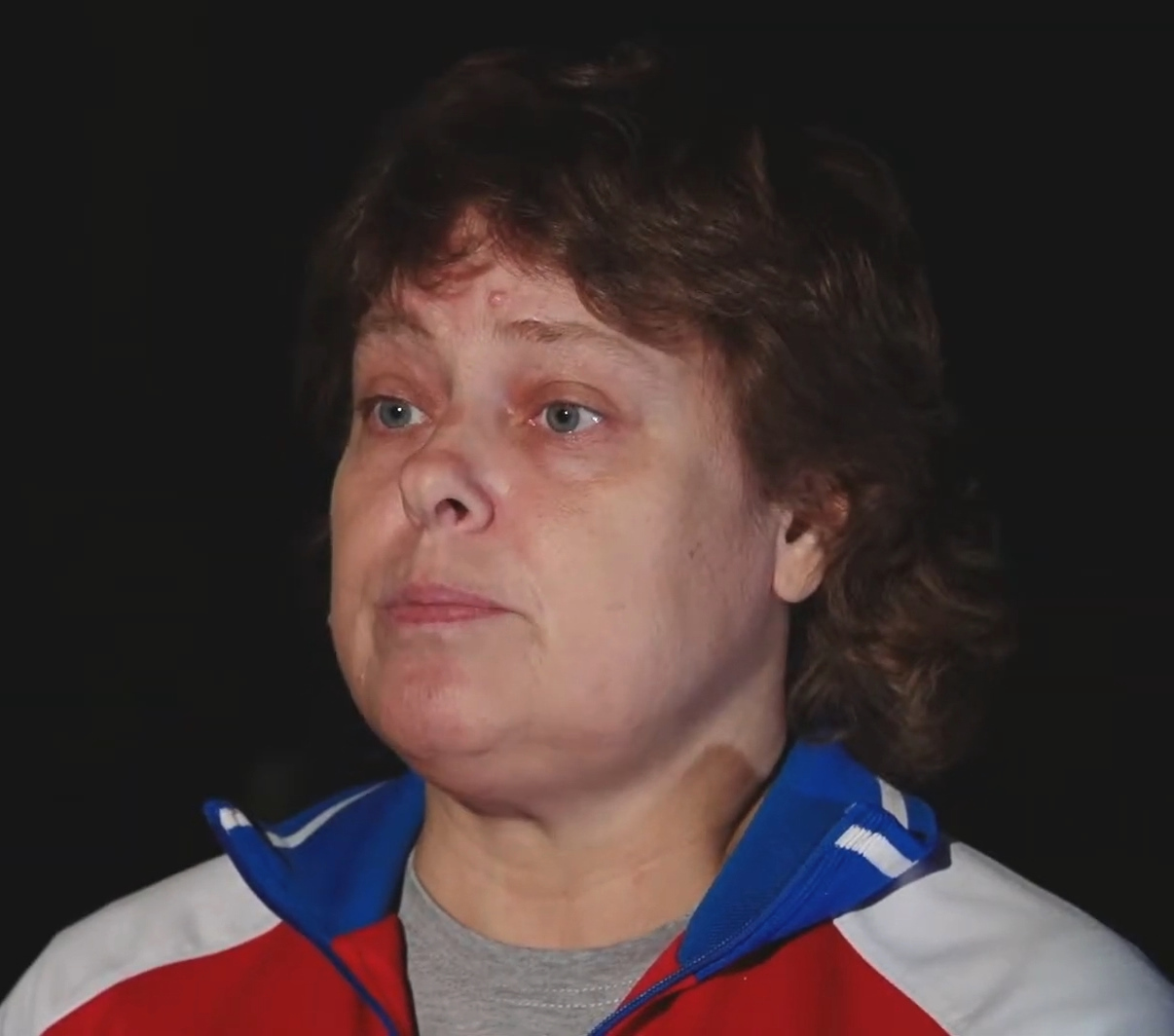
- Olga Kuznetsova in 2016

Medal record

Women's shooting

Representing Russia

Olympic Games
Gold medal – first place	1996 Atlanta	10 m air pistol

World Championships
Bronze medal – third place	2002 Lahti	10 m air pistol

Olga Gennadyevna Kuznetsova (Russian: Ольга Геннадьевна Кузнецова, née Klochneva; born 17 November 1968 in Samara, Russian SSR, Soviet Union) is a Russian sport shooter, specializing in the pistols event. She won the gold medal at the 1996 Olympic Games in the 10 metre air pistol event. She competed at three Olympic Games: 1996, 2000 and 2004.

== Olympic results ==
Event	1996	2000	2004
10 metre air pistol	(gold) Gold; 389+101.1	5th 386+96.4	9th 383
25 metre pistol	—	15th 578	—
