= Monica Rundqvist =

Swedish sports shooter

Personal information
- Nationality: Swedish
- Born: March 15, 1962 (age 63); Vårgårda

Sport
- Sport: Shooting

Monica Rundqvist (born 15 March 1962 in Vårgårda) is a Swedish sport shooter. She tied for 11th place in the women's 10 metre air pistol event and tied for 33rd place in the women's 25 metre pistol event at the 2000 Summer Olympics.
