= Margarita de Falconí =

Ecuadorian sports shooter

Personal information
- Nationality: Ecuadorian
- Born: 22 December 1944 (age 81)

Sport
- Sport: Sports shooting

Margarita de Falconí (born 22 December 1944) is an Ecuadorian sports shooter. She competed in the women's 10 metre air pistol event at the 1996 Summer Olympics.
