= Ruwani Abeymanne =

Sri Lankan sports shooter (born 1970)

Personal information
- Born: 19 August 1970

Sport
- Sport: Shooting

Ruwani Abeymanne (born 19 August 1970) is a former Sri Lankan female shooter. She represented Sri Lanka at the 2000 Summer Olympics. She competed at the Women's 10 metre air pistol and in the Women's 25 metre air pistol events in the 2000 Summer Olympics.
