= Annemarie Forder =

Australian sports shooter (born 1978)

Olympic medal record

Women's shooting

Olympic Games
Bronze medal – third place	2000 Sydney	Air pistol

Commonwealth Games
Gold medal – first place	1998 Kuala Lumpur	10m Air pistol
Gold medal – first place	1998 Kuala Lumpur	10m Air pistol pairs
Bronze medal – third place	2002 Manchester	10m Air pistol
Bronze medal – third place	2002 Manchester	10m Air pistol pairs

Annemarie Forder (born 31 January 1978) is an Australian who competes in the individual Olympic Air Pistol event, where she won a bronze medal at the 2000 Sydney Olympic Games, she also competed at the 1996 Atlanta Summer Olympic Games in the same event, where she placed 23rd. Forder also represented Australia at the 1998 Kuala Lumpur Commonwealth Games, where she won 2 Gold Medals and broke the Commonwealth Record in the individual Air Pistol event, she also competed at the 2002 Manchester Commonwealth Games where she won 2 bronze medals.

Forder is one of eight children - six brothers and one sister - and originally became interested in shooting when she went to a shooting club at 14 with her brother.

In winning the bronze medal in the women's air pistol at Sydney 2000 Annemarie Forder became only the second Australian, after Pattie Dench's bronze medal in the women's sport pistol at Los Angeles 1984, to be placed in an Olympic pistol shooting or rifle event. Forder competed at Atlanta 1996, whilst still a teenager, and won a gold medal at the Kuala Lumpur 1998 Commonwealth Games. http://corporate.olympics.com.au/athlete/annemarie-forder

Annemarie Forder is a current Griffith University student, and is working toward attaining her bachelor's degree in 2015.

Olympic results
Event	1996	2000
10 metre air pistol	23rd 376	(bronze) Bronze; 385+99.0
