= Red Hardy =

American baseball player (1923-2003)

- Pitcher
- Born: January 6, 1923; Marmarth, North Dakota, U.S.
- Died: August 15, 2003 (aged 80); Phoenix, Arizona, U.S.
- Batted: Right Threw: Right

MLB debut
- June 20, 1951, for the New York Giants

Last MLB appearance
- June 23, 1951, for the New York Giants

MLB statistics
- Win–loss record: 0–0
- Earned run average: 6.75
- Strikeouts: 0
- Stats at Baseball Reference

Teams
- New York Giants (1951)

Francis Joseph "Red" Hardy (January 6, 1923 in Marmarth, North Dakota – August 15, 2003 in Phoenix, Arizona) was an American right-handed Major League Baseball pitcher who played for the New York Giants in 1951.

Prior to playing professionally, he attended the University of St. Thomas.

Although Baseball-Reference.com says Hardy began his professional career in 1946 (i.e., that is when the Giants signed him), the SABR minor league database says he played some minor league baseball in 1942. The interruption in his professional career can be attributed to him serving as a pilot in the Navy during World War II.

In 1942, he played for the Eau Claire Bears, going 3–4 in 14 appearances. He played for the Minneapolis Millers and St. Cloud Rox in 1946, going 0–0 in five appearances with the Millers and 7–0 with a 1.70 ERA in eight games with the Rox.

From 1947 to 1949, he played for Minneapolis, going 9–9 in 1947, 10–10 in 1948 and 4–4 in 1949. He also played for the Jersey City Giants in 1949, going 8–8 with them. In 1950, he played for Jersey City again, going 13–13. From 1947 to 1950, he finished exactly .500 each year.

Although he spent most of 1951 in the minors, going 6–5 with the Ottawa Giants and 3–5 with the Oakland Oaks, he also spent a couple games in the majors. On June 20, he made his debut, and on June 23, he played in his second and last game. Overall, he made two relief appearances, allowing four hits and one run in 1 1/3 innings of work.

Following his death, he was buried in St. Francis Catholic Cemetery in Phoenix.
