= Majbritt Hjortshøj =

Danish sports shooter (born 1976)

Personal information
- Nationality: Danish
- Born: 25 May 1976 (age 49); Aalborg, Denmark

Sport
- Sport: Sports shooting

Majbritt Hjortshøj (born 25 May 1976) is a Danish sports shooter. She competed in the women's 10 metre air pistol event at the 1996 Summer Olympics.
