= Christina Cassidy =

American sports shooter

Personal information
- Born: 12 January 1982 (age 44) Oceanside, California, United States

Sport
- Sport: Sports shooting

Christina Cassidy (born January 12, 1982) is an American sports shooter. She competed in the women's 10 metre air pistol event at the 2000 Summer Olympics.
