= St. Francis Catholic Cemetery =

Catholic cemetery in Phoenix, Arizona

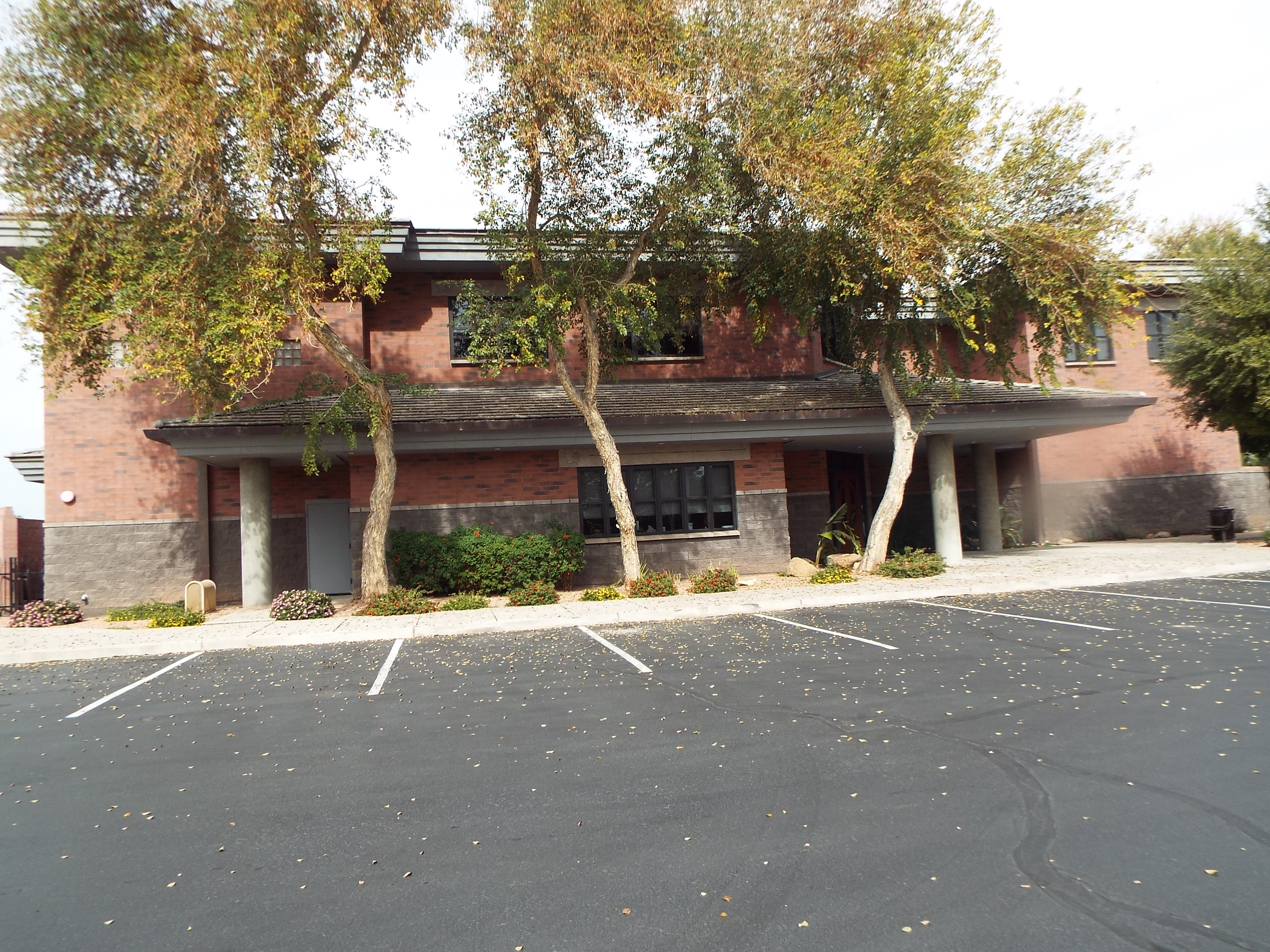
- St. Francis Catholic Cemetery

Details
- Established: 1897
- Location: 2033 N. 48th Street, Phoenix, Maricopa County, Arizona
- Country: U.S.
- Coordinates: 33°28′20″N 111°58′32″W
- Owned by: Diocese of Phoenix
- Size: 52 acres
- No. of interments: >34,000
- Find a Grave: St. Francis Catholic Cemetery

St. Francis Catholic Cemetery, established in 1897, is one of the oldest in the city of Phoenix, Arizona. It consists of 52 acres (210,000 m^{2}), 45 of which are developed. Before 1969, the cemetery was run by the Order of St. Francis, under the Diocese of Tucson. However, following 1969 it became an independent cemetery and is now owned and run by the Diocese of Phoenix. Its inhabitants represent pioneer families, community and business leaders, miners, those who succumbed to tuberculosis, and others who helped write the history of Phoenix and Arizona. Margaret Geare of Dublin, Ireland, who was buried on Oct. 12, 1897, is believed to be the first to be buried in the cemetery. The cemetery is located at 2033 N. 48th Street.

== Notable interments ==
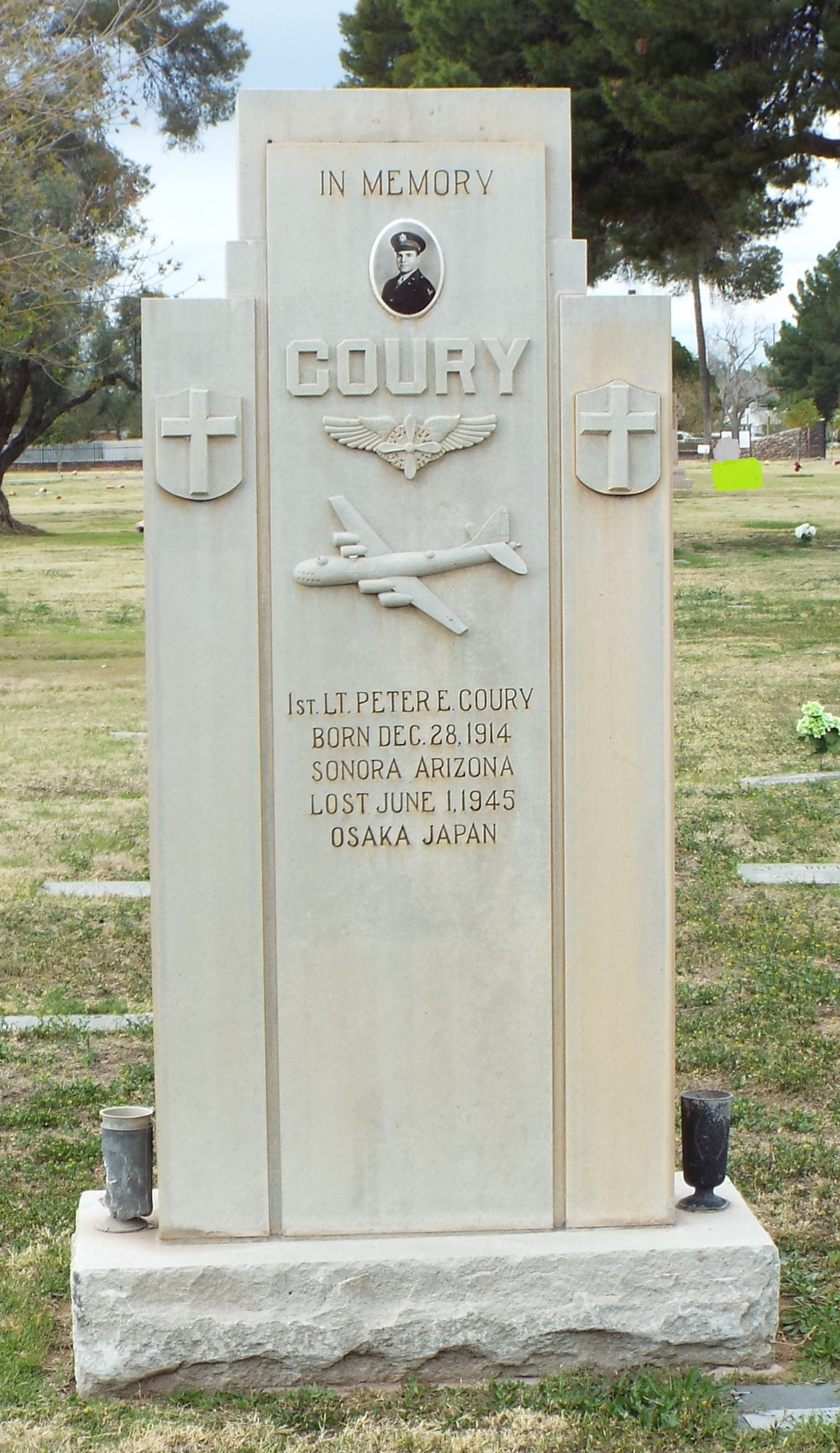
Headstone in the memory of 1st Lt. Peter E. Coury whose plane was lost on June 1, 1945, during a bombing raid over Osaka, Japan.

- Louis J. D’Ambrosio (Lou Ambers) (1913–1995) – Ambers, was a World lightweight boxing champion from 1936 to 1940. He is buried alongside his wife Margaret M. D’Ambrosio (1916–2009).
- Felix Carbajal (1896–1978) – Carbajal was a Filipino pioneer, veteran of World War I and community leader. His house, known as the Kunz-Carbajal House, was the gathering center for the Filipino community in Phoenix. It is listed as historical in the Phoenix Register of Historic Properties.
- Paul Coze (1903–1974) – French-American anthropologist and artist from Beirut who settled in Phoenix in 1951 and made several prominent pieces of public art, including the mural of a Phoenix at Terminal 2 of Sky Harbor International Airport. He was also the French consul for Phoenix.
- William Pinkney DeLancey (1911–1946) – Former Major League Baseball player. He helped to lead the St. Louis Cardinals' fabled Gashouse Gang team to the world championship;
- Dan Devine (1924–2002) – College Football Hall of Fame sports coach
- Adam Perez Diaz (1909–2010) – In 1954, Diaz became the first Hispanic elected to the Phoenix City Council. He was also the first Hispanic to serve as the Vice-Mayor of Phoenix. President Bill Clinton appointed Diaz to the National Council on Aging.
- Francis Joseph "Red" Hardy (1923–2003) – Former Major League Baseball pitcher who played for the New York Giants in 1951.
- Frank Kush (1929–2017) – National Polish-American Sports Hall of Fame football player and coach
- Ladimir Kwiatkowski (1928–1994) – Known as Ladmo, Kwiatkowski co-hosted The Wallace and Ladmo Show, a daily children's variety show broadcast on KPHO in Phoenix, Arizona. He is buried alongside his wife Patsy L. Kwiatkowski (1930–2011).
- Rose Perica Moffort (1922–2016) – Moffort was Arizona's first female Secretary of State (1977–1988) and first female and 18th Governor of Arizona (1988–1991).
- Ed Pastor (1943–2018) – Pastor was the first Latino to represent Arizona in Congress. He served from 1991 to 2015.
- Bob "Grumpy" Scheffing (1913–1985)– American baseball player, coach, and manager
- Trinidad Escalante Swilling Shumaker (1849–1925) – Known as the "Mother of Phoenix". Swilling Shumaker was the wife of Jack Swilling who is credited with being the founding father of Phoenix.

== Graves ==
St. Francis Catholic Cemetery

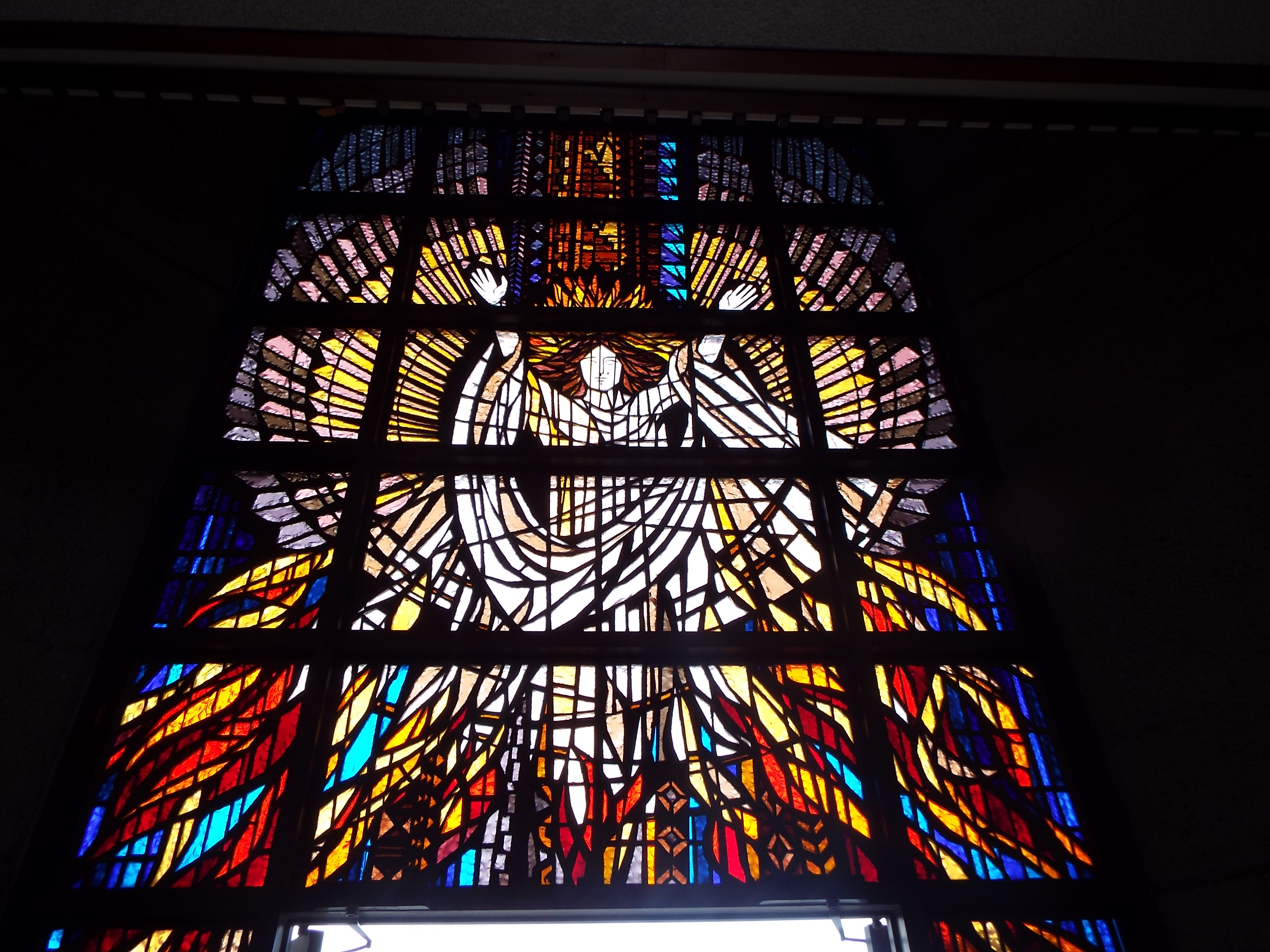
Stained glass window above the entrance of the mausoleum of the St. Francis Cemetery. The stained glass window was donated by the Basha family in memory of Eddie Basha, Sr..

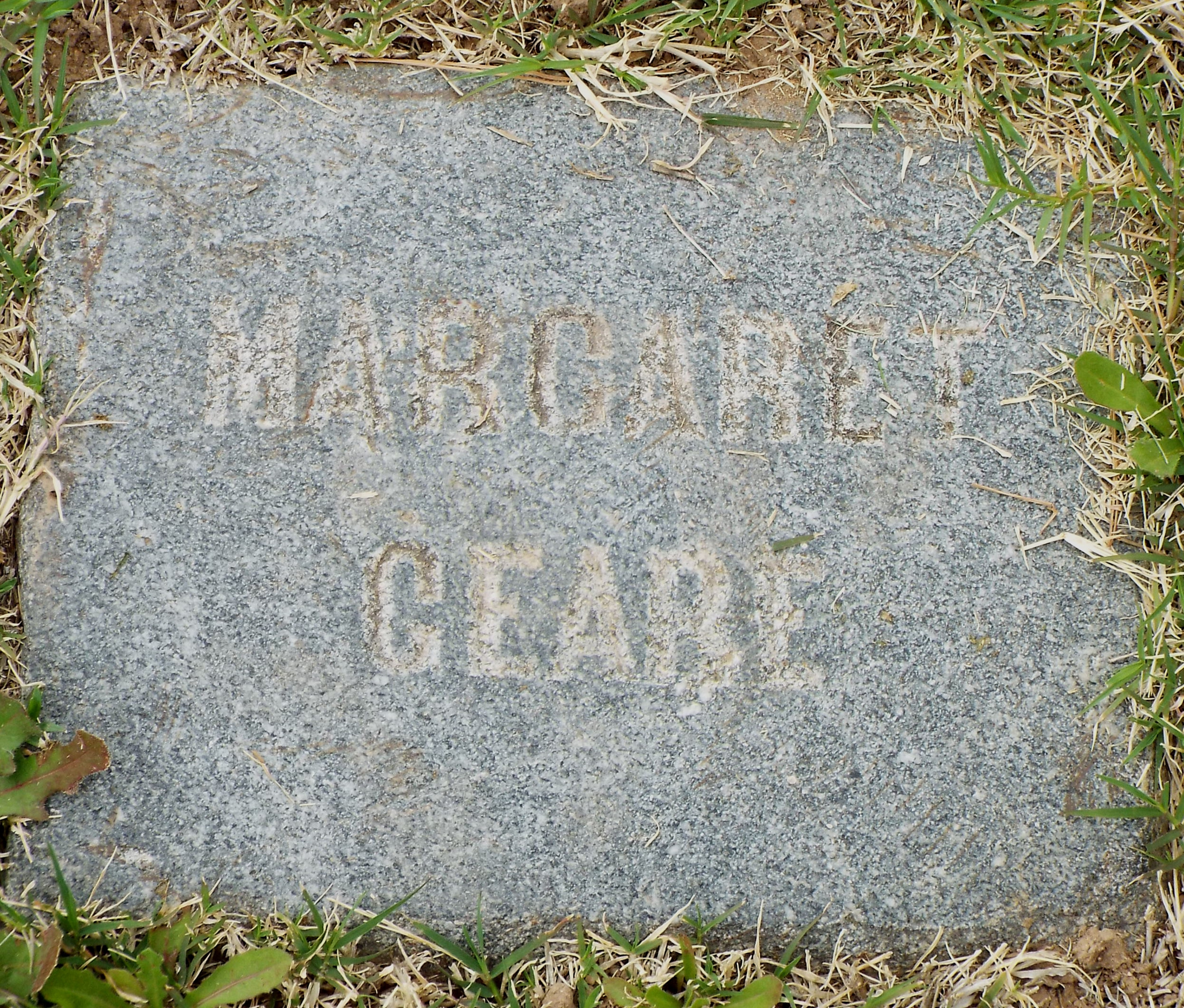
Grave of Margaret Geare (1817–1897).

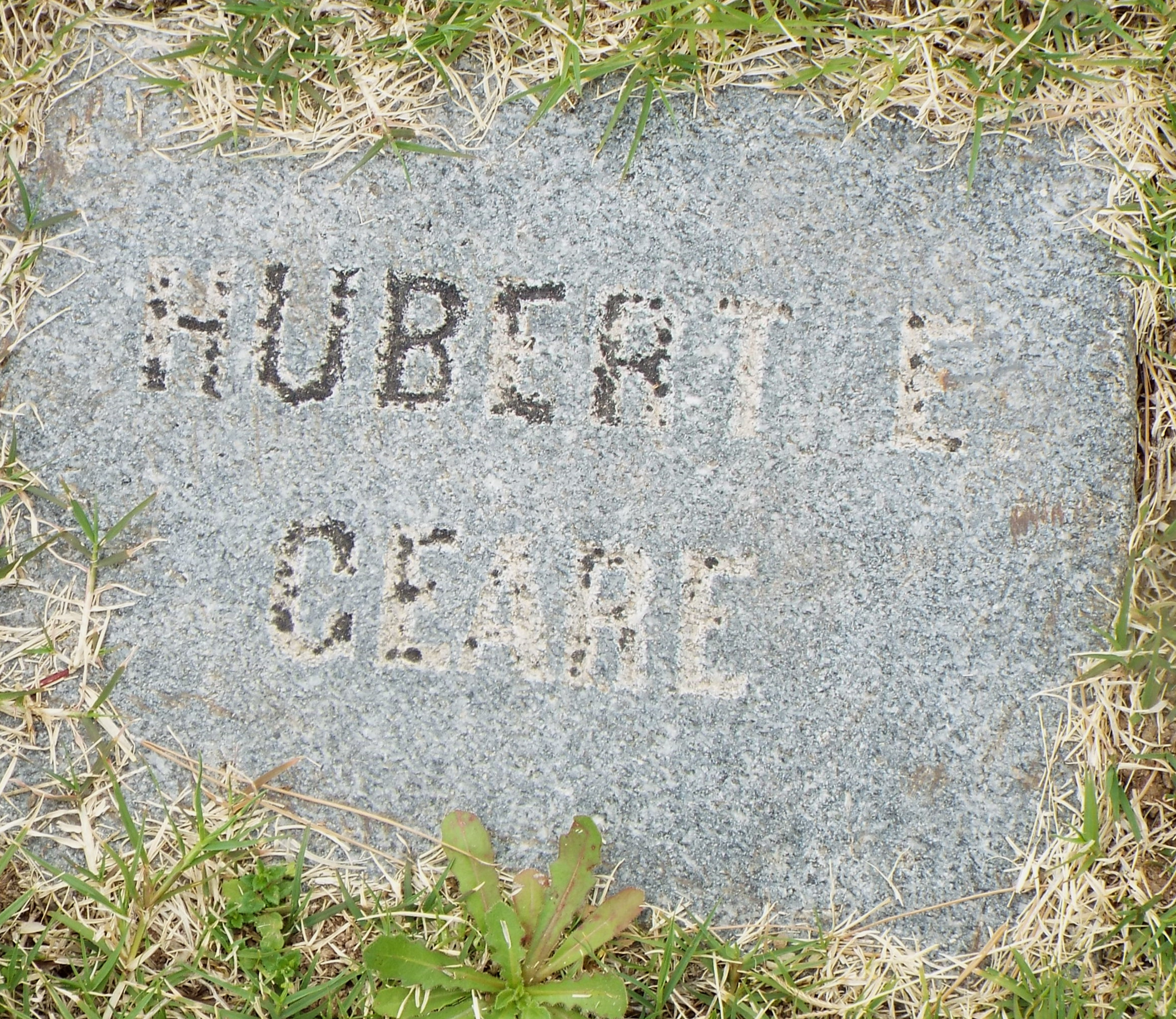
Grave of Hubert Geare (1828–1902).

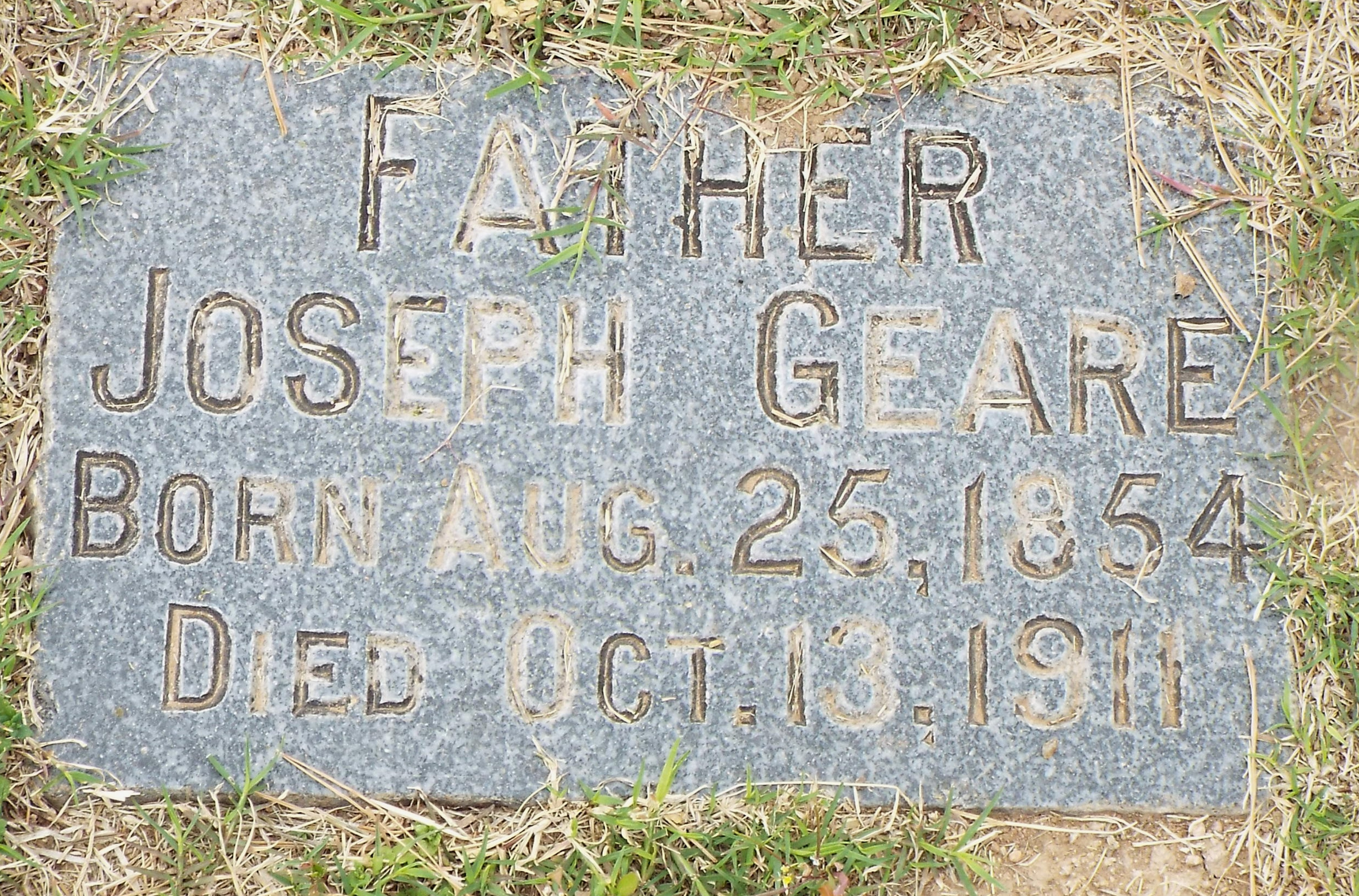
Grave of Joseph Geare (1854–1911).

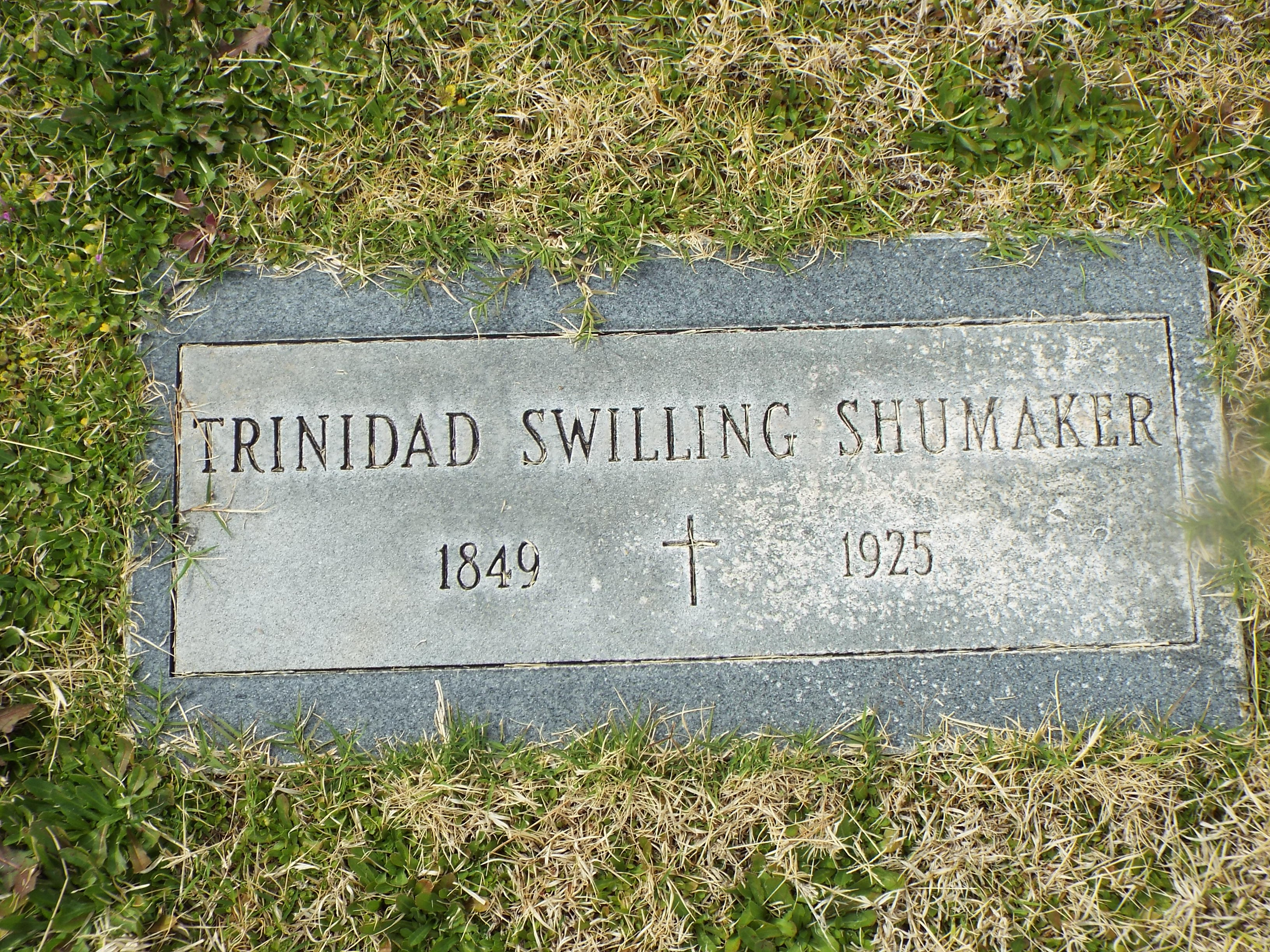
Grave of Trinidad Escalante Swilling Shumaker (1849–1925).

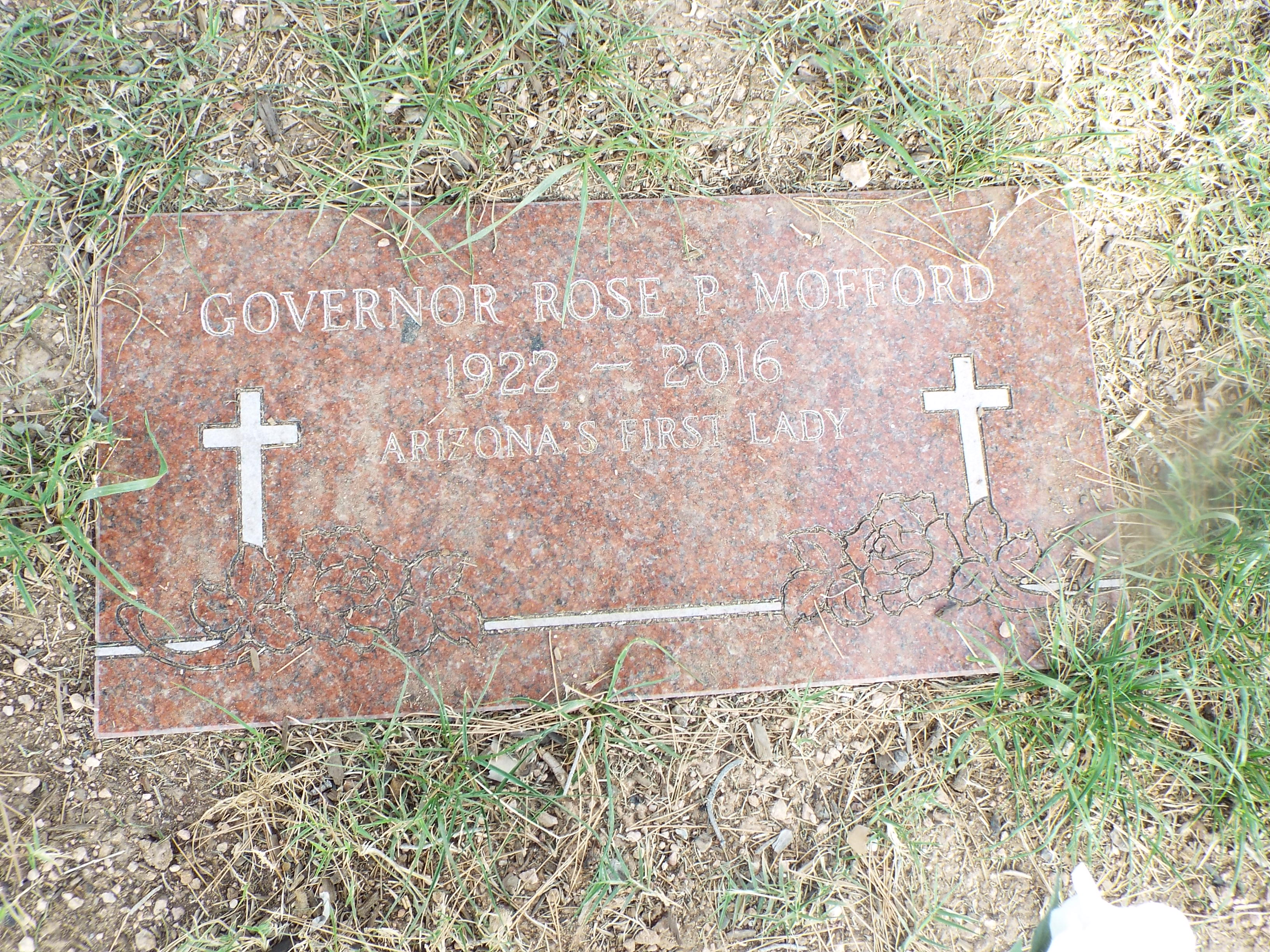
Grave of Governor Rose Perica Moffort (1922–2016).

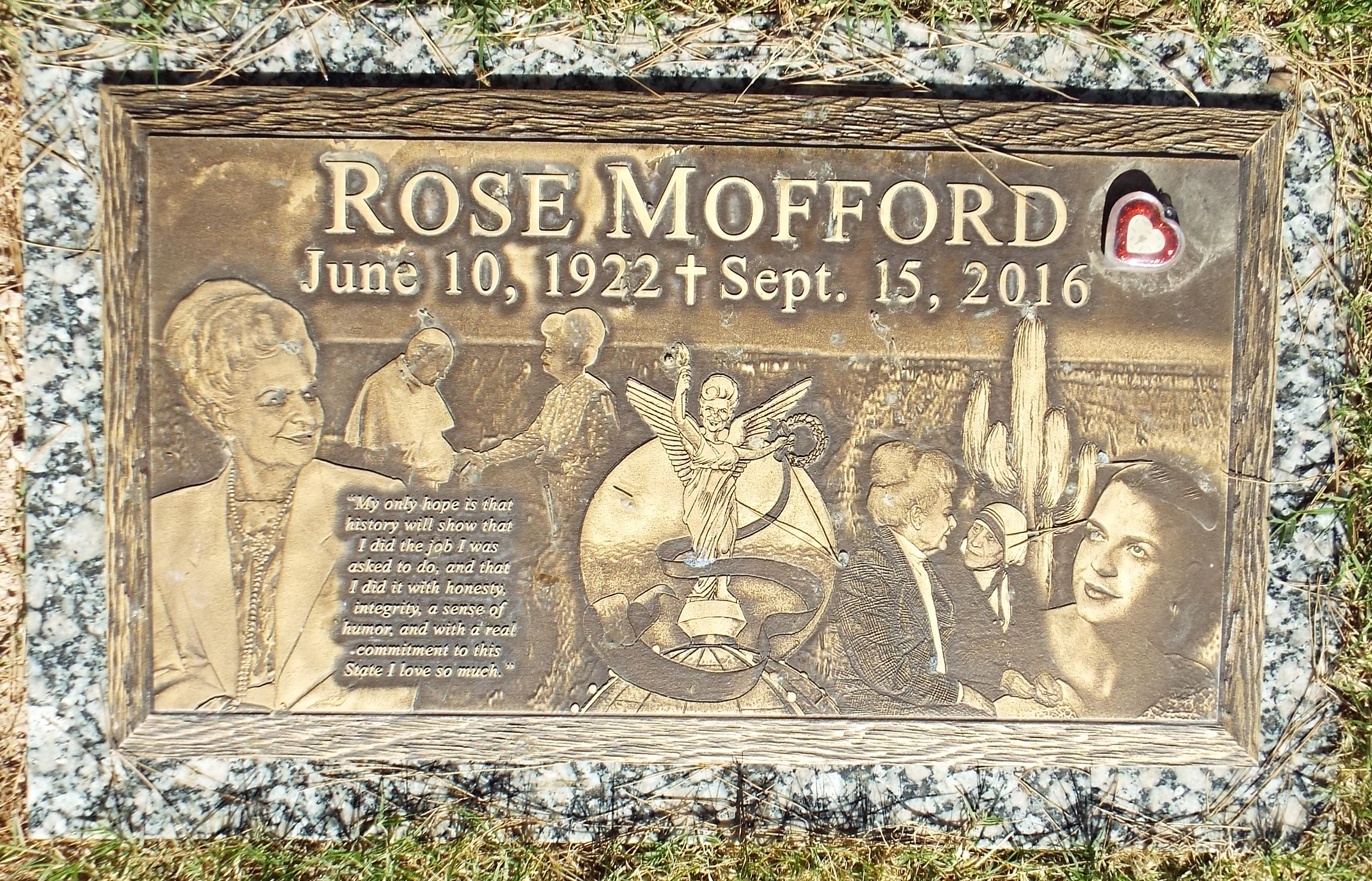
New Rose Perica Moffort (1922–2016) grave marker.

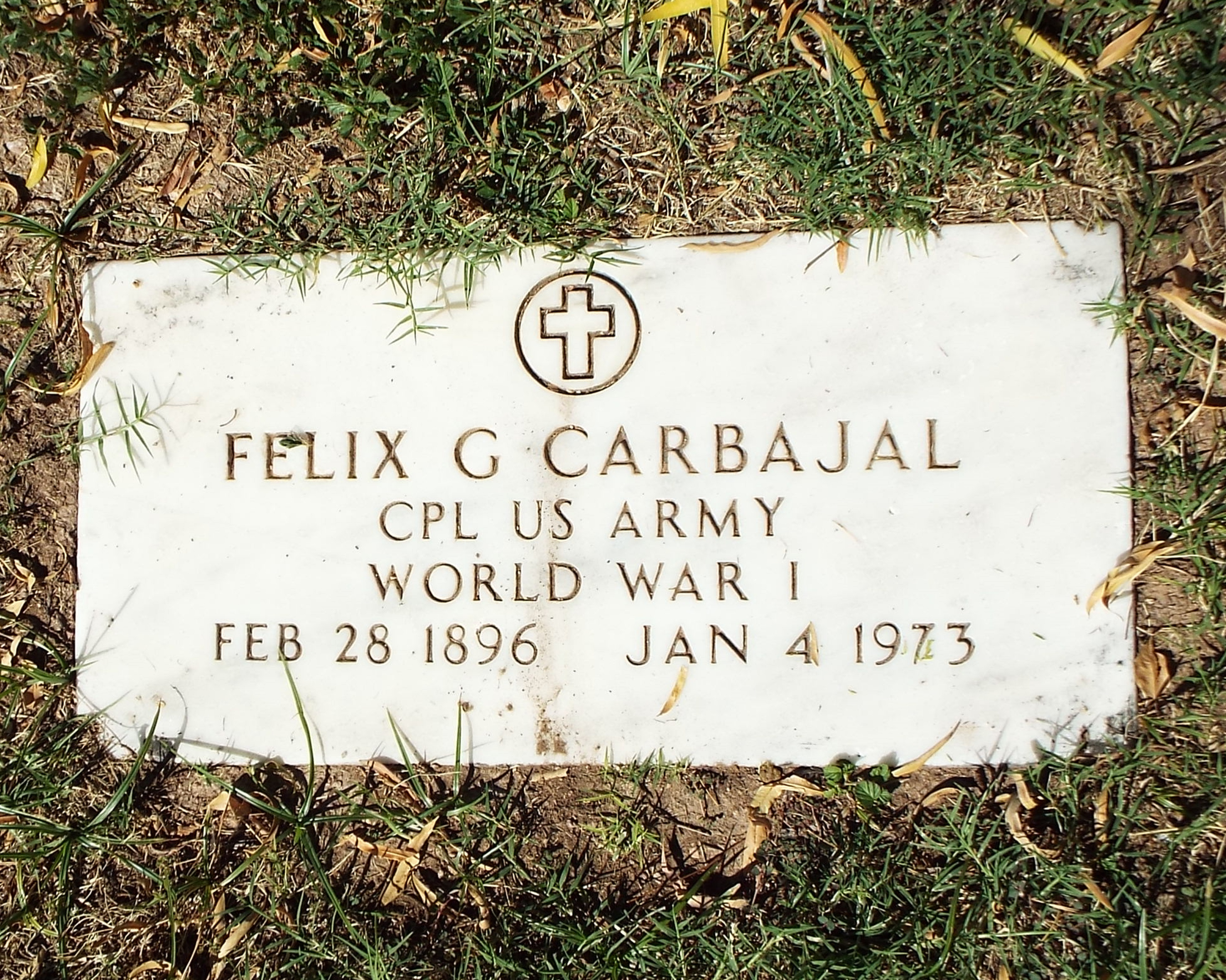
Grave of Felix Carbajal (1896–1978).

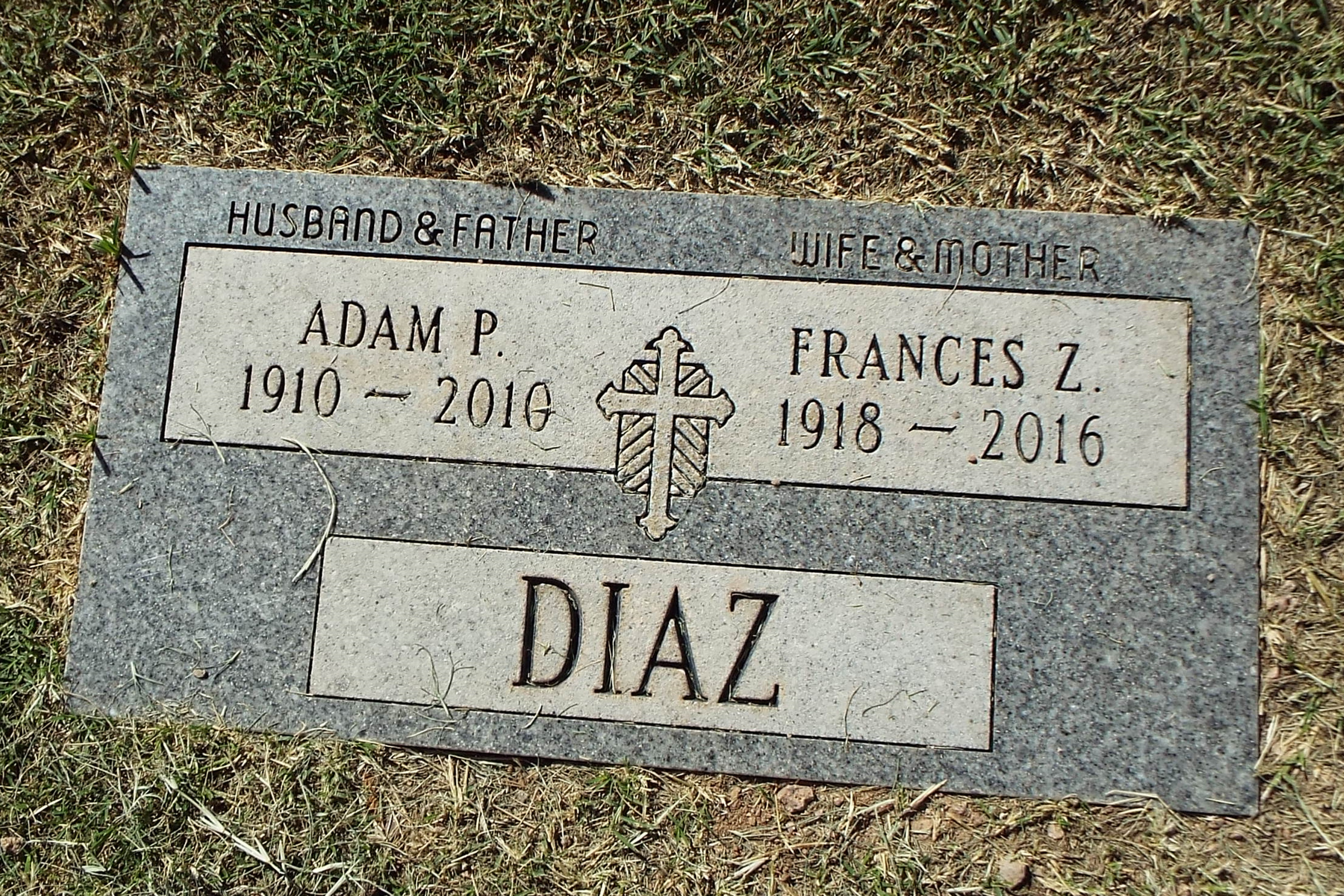
Grave of Adam Perez Diaz (1909–2010) and his wife Frances Z. Diaz (1918–2016).

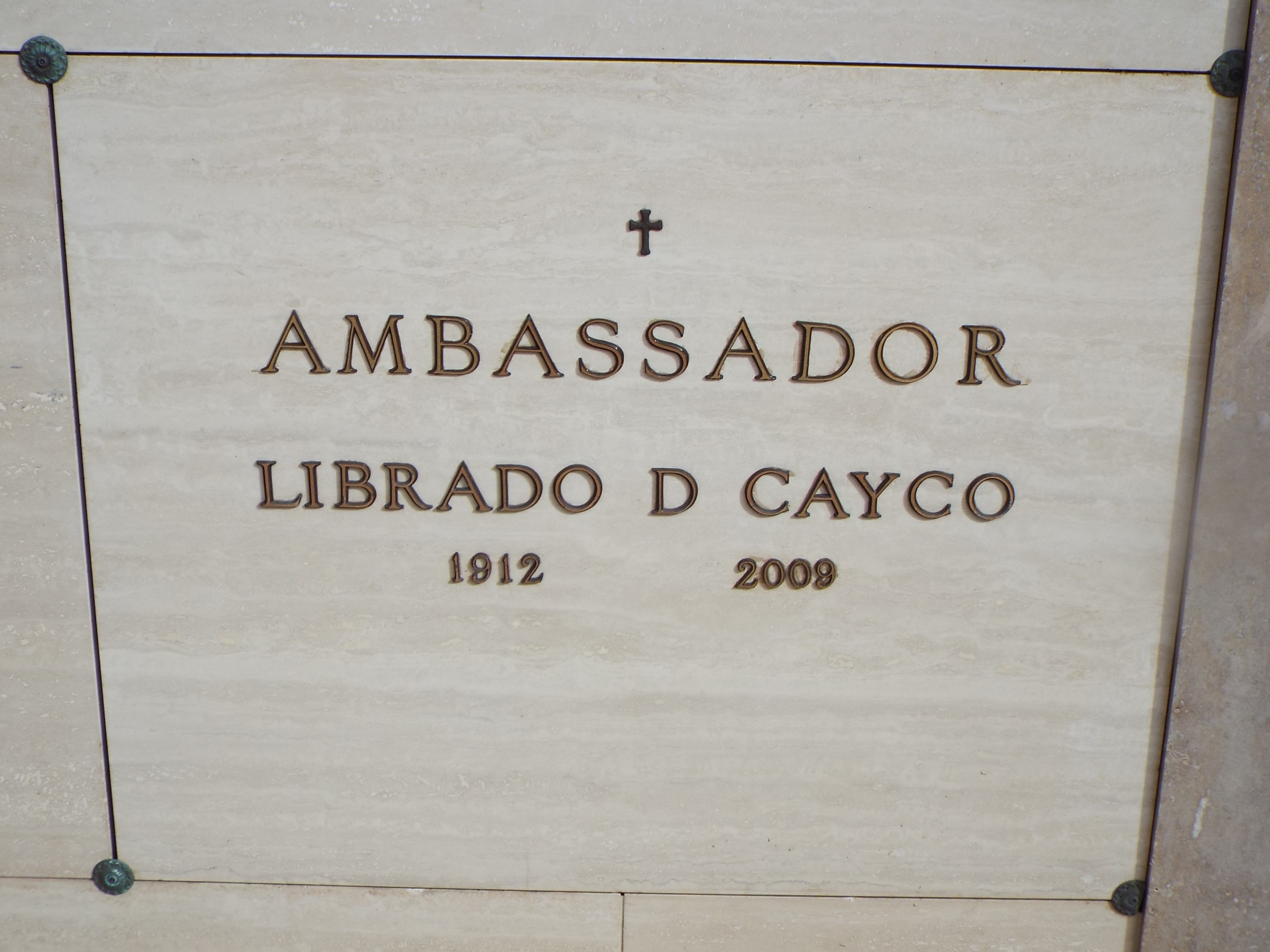
Crypt of Ambassador Librado D. Cayco (1912–2009).

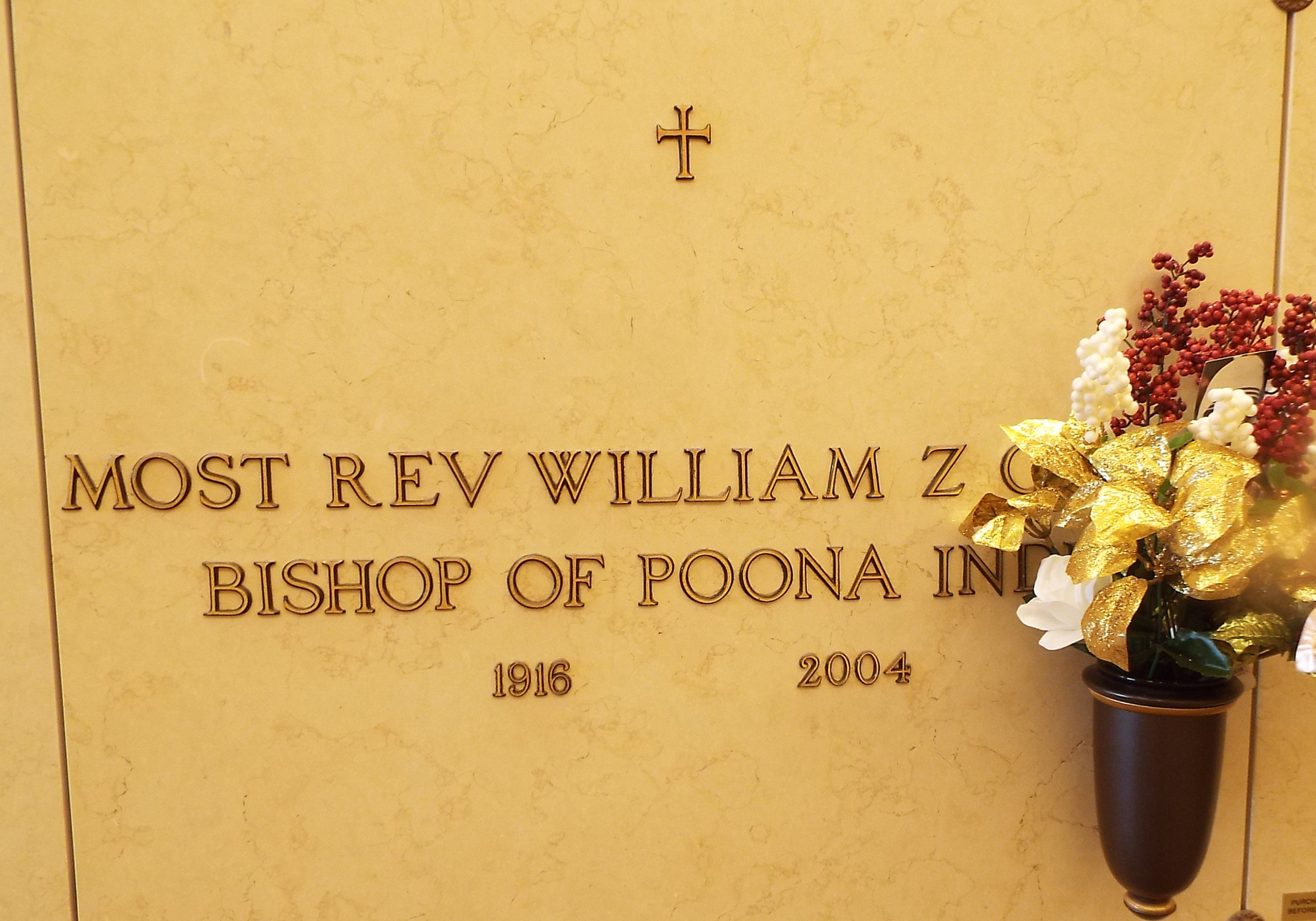
Crypt of Bishop William Zephyrine Gomes (1916–2004).

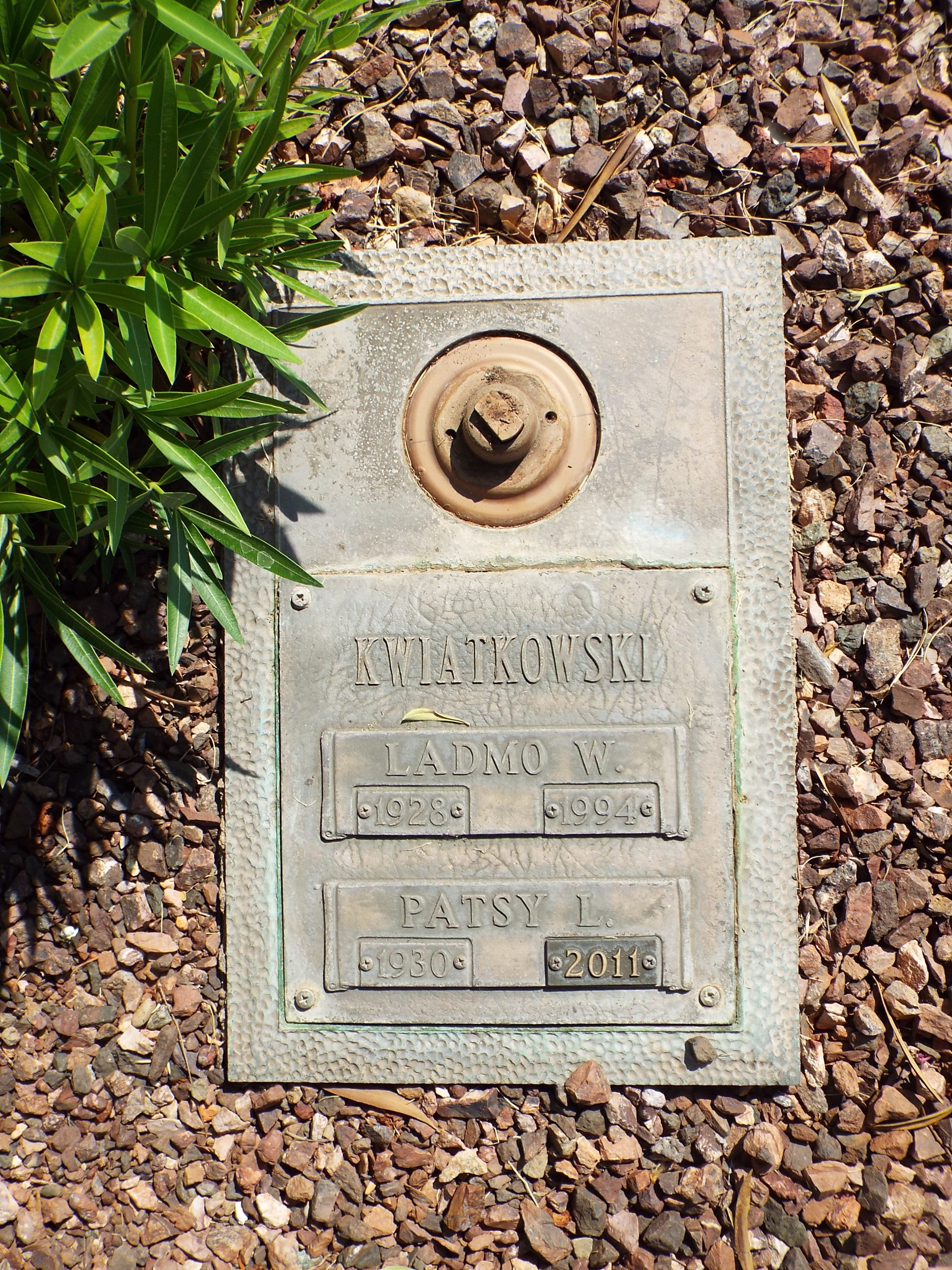
Grave of Ladimir “Ladmo” Kwiatkowski (1928–1994).

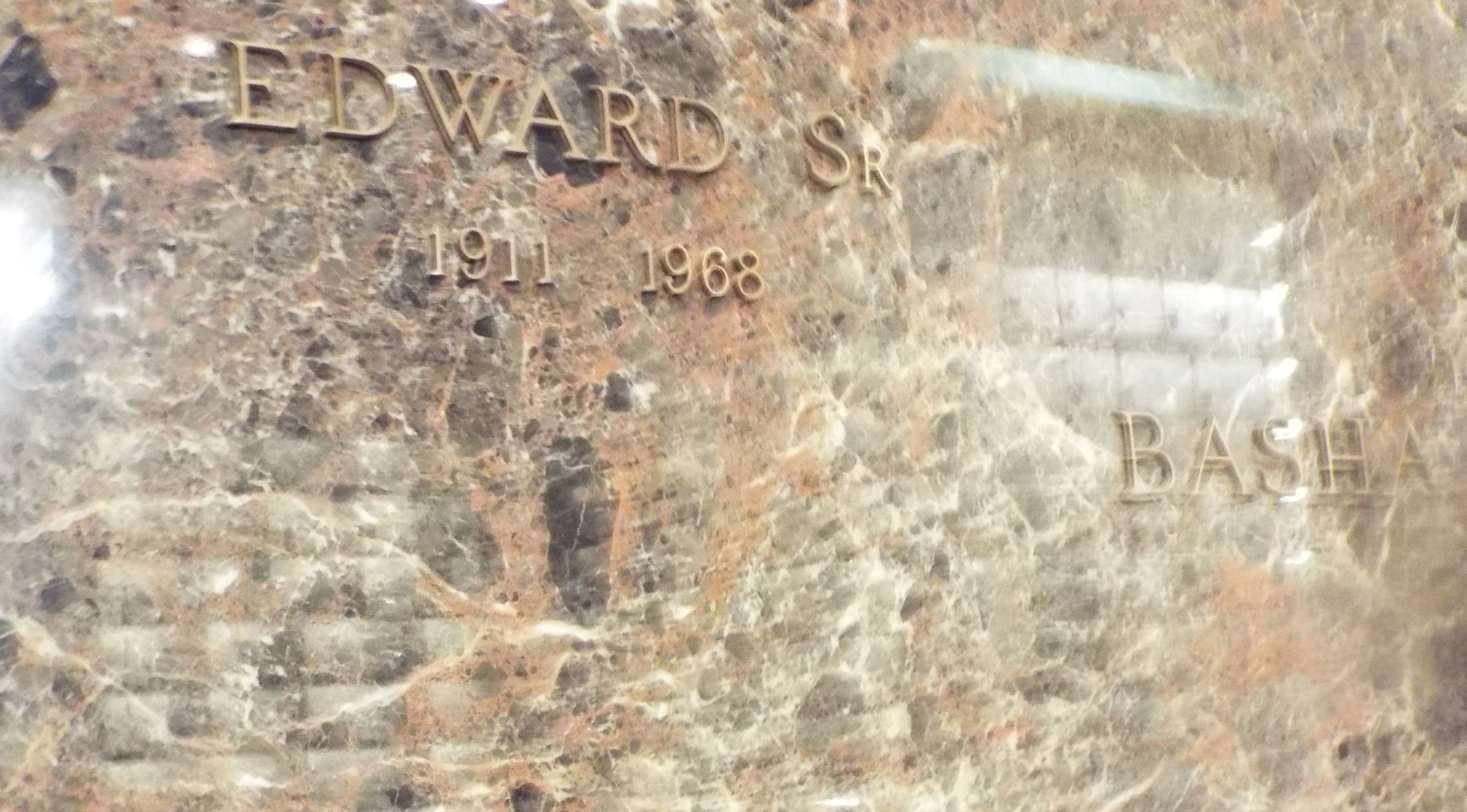
Crypt of Edward Basha Sr. (1911–1968).

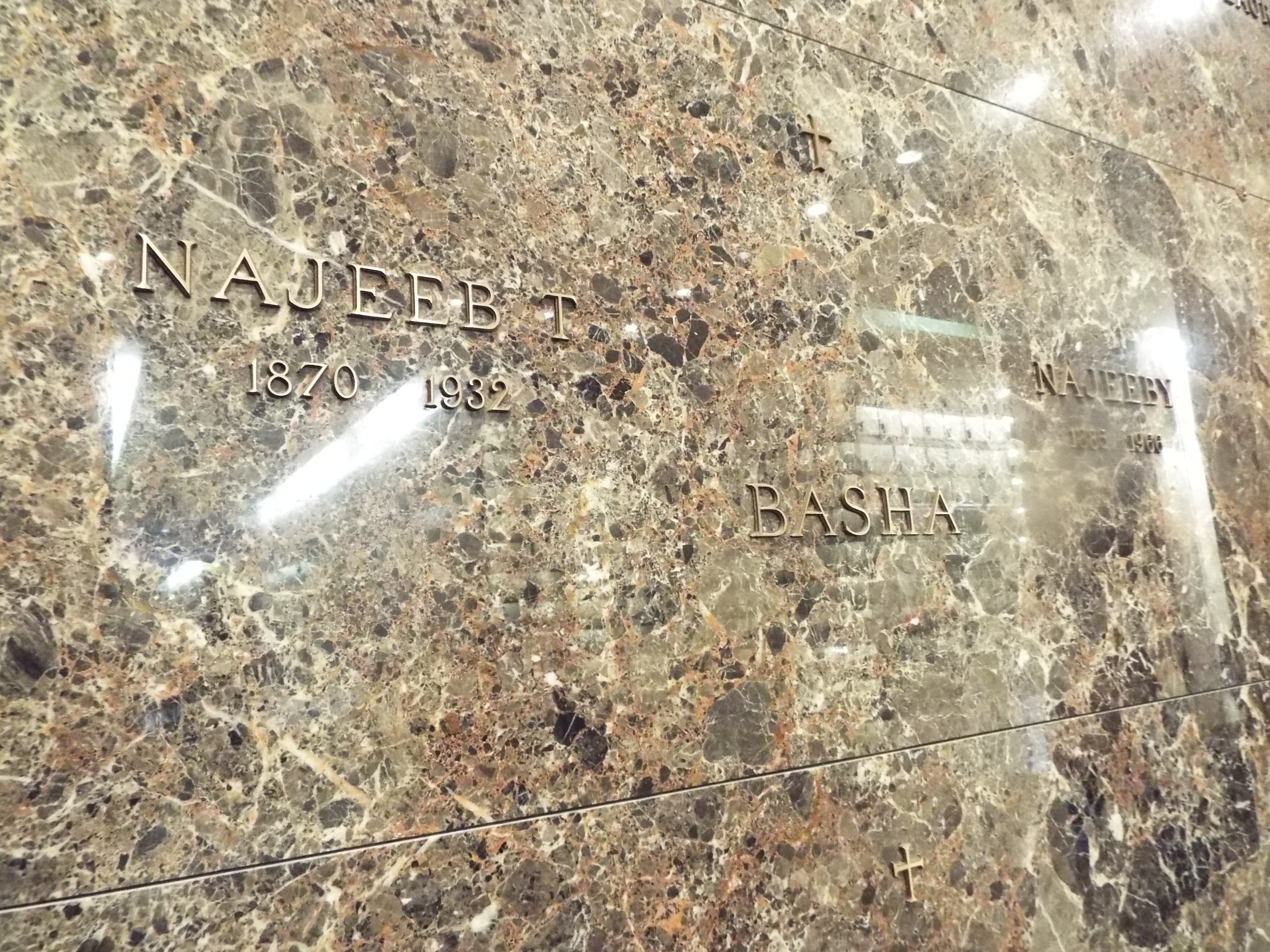
Crypt of Najeeb Basha (1870–1932) and Najeeby Basha (1885–1966).

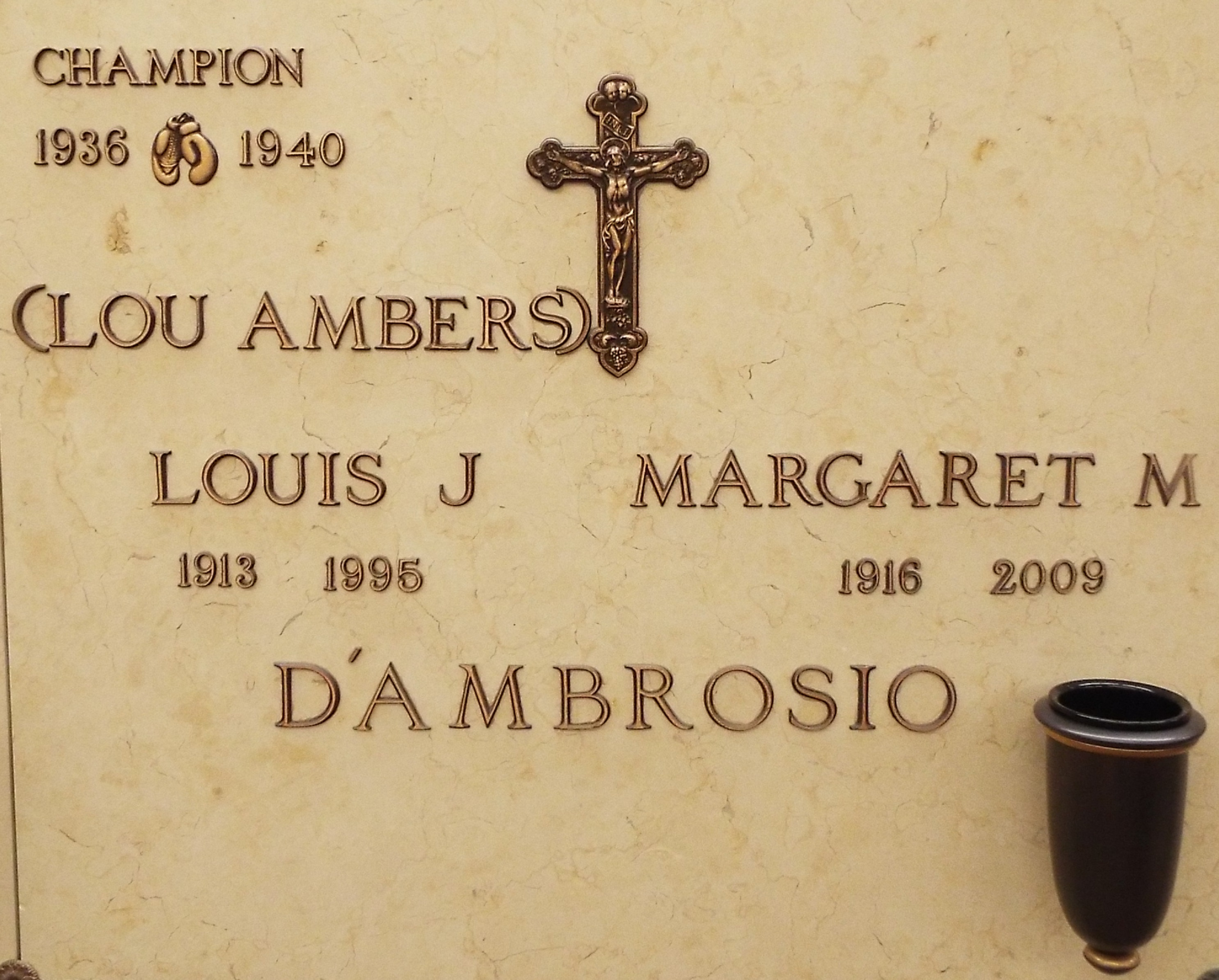
Crypt of Louis J. (Lou Ambers) D’Ambrosio (1913–1995) and his wife Margaret M. D’Ambrosio (1916–2009).

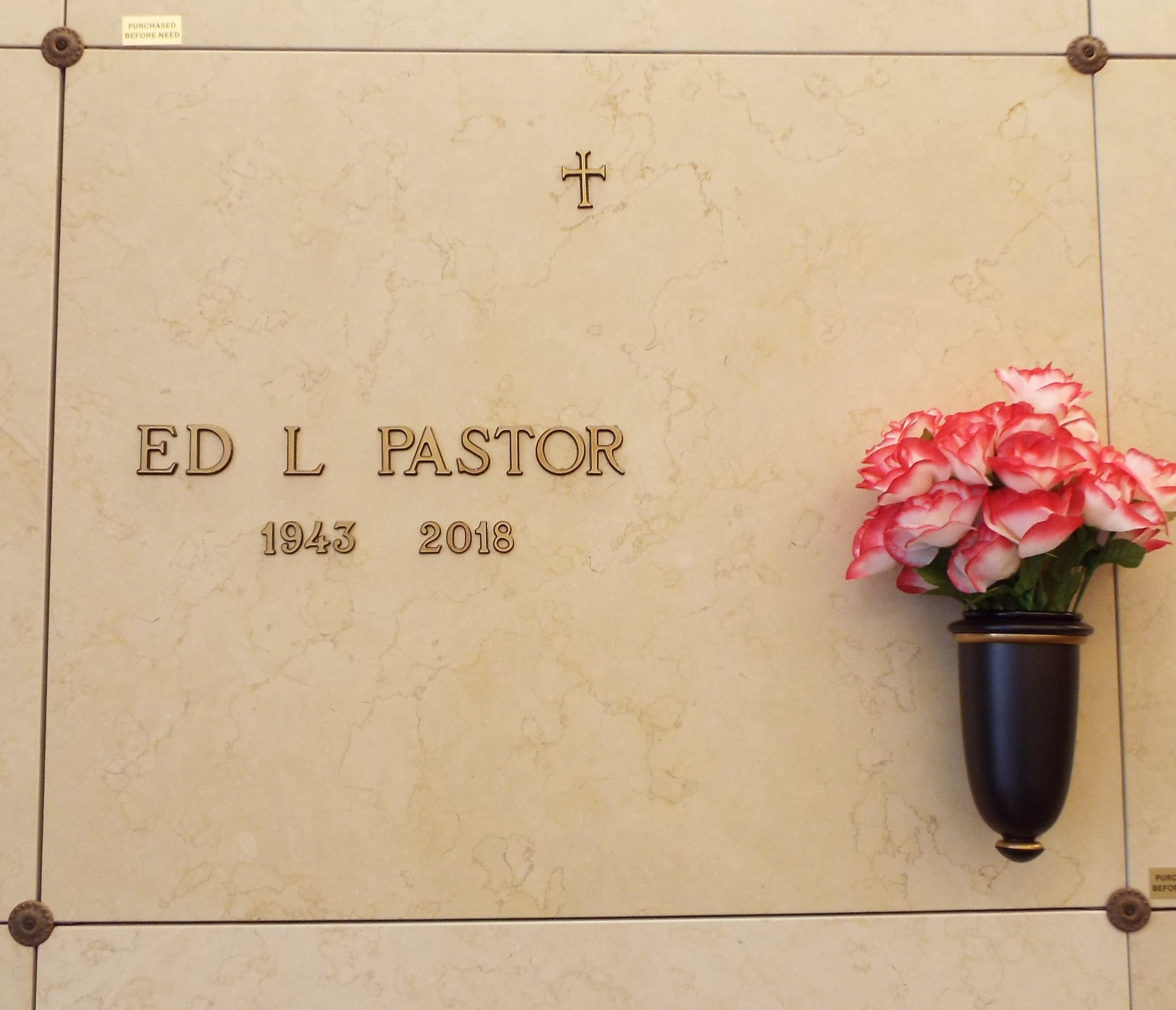
Crypt of Ed Pastor (1943–2018).

== See also ==
- List of historic properties in Phoenix, Arizona
- National Register of Historic Places listings in Maricopa County, Arizona
