= Ma Ge =

Chinese sports shooter

Personal information
- Nationality: Chinese
- Born: 8 July 1969 (age 55)

Sport
- Sport: Sports shooting

Ma Ge (born 8 July 1969) is a Chinese sports shooter. She competed in the women's 25 metre pistol event at the 1996 Summer Olympics.
