= Nino Uchadze =

Georgian sport shooter

Personal information
- Nationality: Georgian
- Born: July 10, 1965 (age 61) Kutaisi

Sport
- Sport: Shooting

Nino Uchadze (born 10 July 1965 in Kutaisi) is a Georgian sport shooter. She competed in shooting events at the 1996 and 2000 Summer Olympics.

== Olympic results ==
Event	1996	2000
25 metre pistol (women)	T-27th	T-33rd
10 metre air pistol (women)	36th	T-28th
