= Lee Hyo-suk =

South Korean sports shooter

Personal information
- Nationality: South Korean
- Born: 28 March 1974 (age 51)

Sport
- Sport: Sports shooting

Lee Hyo-suk (born 28 March 1974) is a South Korean sports shooter. She competed in the women's 10 metre air pistol event at the 1996 Summer Olympics.
