= Diana Iorgova =

Bulgarian sport shooter

Personal information
- Born: 11 April 1971 (age 55)
Medal record
Women's Shooting
Representing Bulgaria
Olympic Games
Silver medal – second place	1996 Atlanta	25 m pistol

Diana Iorgova (Bulgarian: Диана Йоргова) (born 11 April 1971 in Ruse) is a Bulgarian sport shooter. She competed in the pistol shooting events at the Summer Olympics in 1992, 1996, and 2000. At the 1996 Olympics, she won the silver medal in the women's 25 metre pistol event.

== Olympic results ==
Event	1992	1996	2000
25 metre pistol (women)	T-29th	(silver) 2nd	T-28th
10 metre air pistol (women)	—	T-10th	42nd
