= Ayşe Kil =

Turkish sports shooter

Personal information
- Nationality: Turkish
- Born: July 9, 1972 (age 52)

Sport
- Sport: Shooting

Ayşe Kil (born 9 July 1972) is a Turkish sport shooter. She tied for 25th place in the women's 25 metre pistol event at the 2000 Summer Olympics.
