= Lu Fang (sport shooter) =

Chinese sport shooter

Lu Fang (Chinese: 陆芳; born 5 May 1972) is a female Chinese sports shooter. She competed in the Women's 10 metre air pistol at the 1996 Summer Olympics, finishing 14th.
