= Shirley Ng =

Singaporean sports shooter

Personal information
- Nationality: Singaporean
- Born: 24 November 1960 (age 64)

Sport
- Sport: Sports shooting

Peck Yui "Shirley" Ng (born 24 November 1960) is a Singaporean sports shooter. She competed in the women's 10 metre air pistol event at the 2000 Summer Olympics.
