= Jenny Schuverer =

Panamanian sports shooter

Personal information
- Nationality: Panamanian
- Born: 30 June 1973 (age 53)

Sport
- Sport: Sports shooting

Jenny Schuverer (born 30 June 1973) is a Panamanian sports shooter. She competed in the women's 10 metre air pistol event at the 1996 Summer Olympics.
