= Marija Mladenović =

Serbian sports shooter

Personal information
- Nationality: Serbian
- Born: 19 October 1978 (age 46)

Sport
- Sport: Sports shooting

Marija Mladenović (born 19 October 1978) is a Serbian sports shooter. She competed in the women's 10 metre air pistol event at the 1996 Summer Olympics.
