= Barbara Stizzoli =

Italian sports shooter

Personal information
- Nationality: Italian
- Born: 29 May 1969 (age 55); Tolmezzo, Italy

Sport
- Sport: Sports shooting

Barbara Stizzoli (born 29 May 1969) is an Italian sports shooter. She competed in two events at the 1996 Summer Olympics.
