= Pierre Saint-Sevin =

French cellist and composer

Pierre Saint-Sevin, dit l'Abbé l'ainé (1 May 1695 in Bordeaux – May 1768 in Paris) was a French cellist and composer.

Along with his brother Philippe Saint-Sevin, he was a music-master of the parish church of Agen in Aquitaine early in the eighteenth century. It is doubtful that he was actually an ordained priest, or merely in consequence of his office had to wear the ecclesiastical dress, but he received the name l'Abbé l'ainé, or simply l'Abbé.

Later, he and his brother gave up their connection with the church and went to Paris, where they obtained engagements at the Grand Opera. They were both excellent players, but Philippe seems to have been the more celebrated of the two.

He is the uncle of the violinist Joseph-Barnabé Saint-Sevin, dit L'Abbé le Fils.
