= Philippe Saint-Sevin =

French cellist

- Born: 1698
- Died: 1777 (aged 78–79)
- Occupation: Musician
- Children: Joseph-Barnabé Saint-Sevin dit L'Abbé le Fils

Philippe Pierre de St. Sevin, dit l′Abbé cadet (1698–1777) was a French cellist.

Along with his older brother, Pierre Saint-Sevin, he was a music-master of the parish church of Agen in Aquitaine. It seems doubtful whether he was actually an ordained priest, or merely in consequence of his office had to wear the ecclesiastical dress, but from this situation he received the name l′Abbé cadet.

Later, both he and his brother gave up their connection with the church and went to Paris, where they obtained engagements at the Grand Opera.

Both Philippe and Pierre were excellent players, but Philippe seems to have been the more celebrated of the two, and to have been specially remarkable for his beautiful tone. It is said to have been owing in great measure to the impression produced by his playing that the viola da gamba more and more fell into disuse and the violoncello was more extensively introduced.

He was the father of the violinist Joseph-Barnabé Saint-Sevin, dit L′Abbé le Fils.
