= Song Ji-yeong =

South Korean sports shooter

Personal information
- Nationality: South Korean
- Born: 1 December 1982 (age 42)

Sport
- Sport: Sports shooting

Song Ji-yeong (born 1 December 1982) is a South Korean sports shooter. She competed in two events at the 2000 Summer Olympics.
