= Joseph-Barnabé Saint-Sevin dit L'Abbé le Fils =

French musician

Joseph-Barnabé Saint-Sevin, dit L′Abbé le Fils (Agen, June 11th, 1727 – Paris, July 25th, 1803) was a French composer and violinist. According to Sheila Nelson, "The very important work of L'Abbé le fils...put France in advance of the rest of Europe with regard to violin technique."

He was an important personality in the French school of violin virtuosos from the eighteenth century. He was a composer and most memorably, author of a highly influential violin method, "the first substantial French violin method," of that time: Principes du Violon (1761). Additionally, he studied with Jean-Marie Leclair.

He was the son of the cellist Philippe Saint-Sevin (l′Abbé cadet) and the nephew of Pierre Saint-Sevin (l′Abbé l′ainé).
