= Jo Ann Sevin =

American sports shooter

Personal information
- Nationality: American
- Born: April 5, 1977 (age 48)

Sport
- Sport: Sports shooting

Jo Ann Sevin (born April 5, 1977) is an American sports shooter. She competed in the women's 10 metre air pistol event at the 1996 Summer Olympics.
