= Paul Coze =

French painter

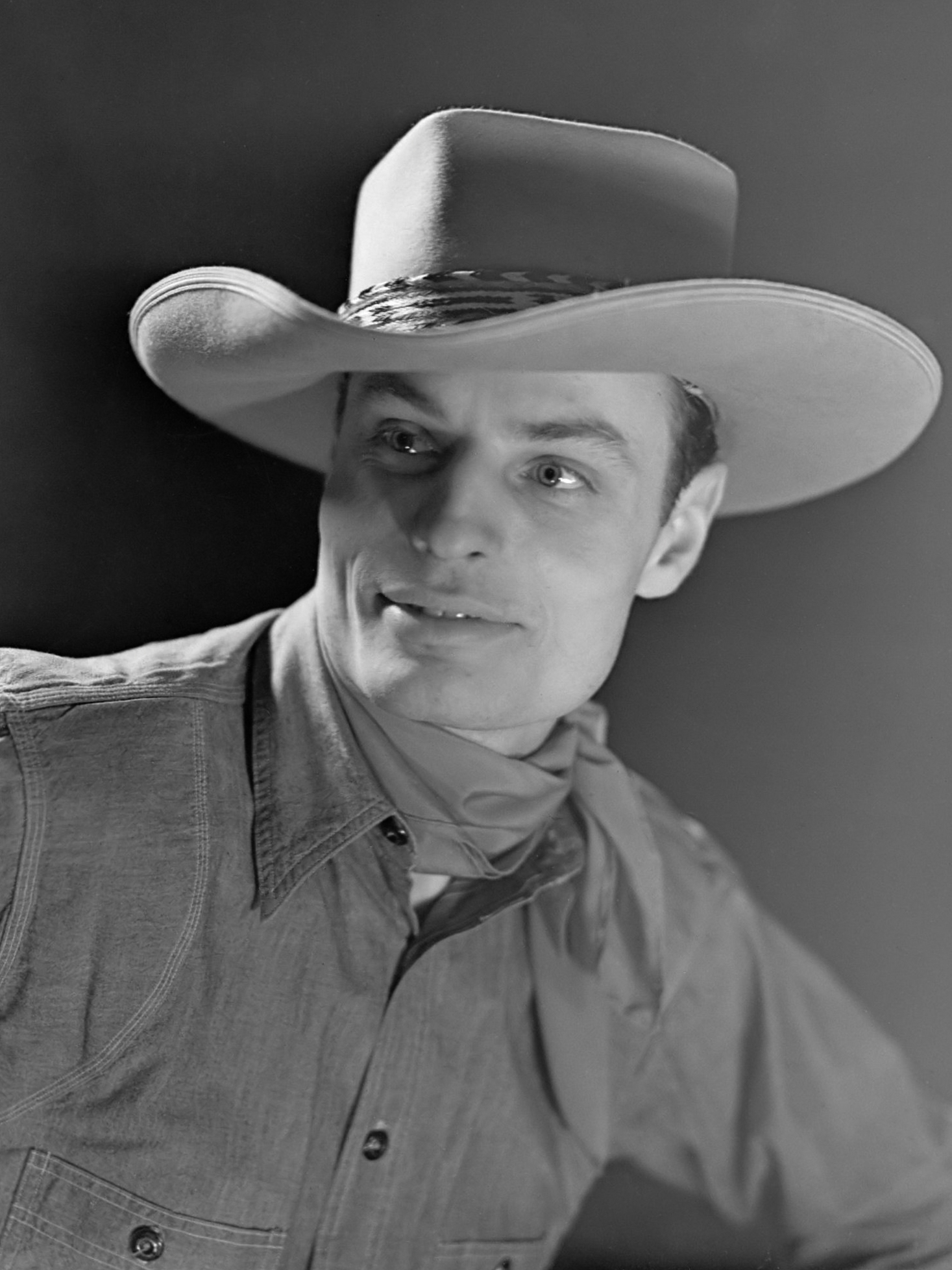
- Coze in 1936
- Born: July 29, 1903; Beirut, Ottoman Empire
- Died: December 2, 1974 (aged 71); Phoenix, Arizona, US
- Resting place: St. Francis Catholic Cemetery, Phoenix, Arizona, US
- Known for: French authority on Native Americans
- Notable work: Mœurs et histoire des Peaux-Rouges
- Style: Native
- Awards: Chevalier de la Légion d'honneur

Paul Coze (born Paul Jean Coze-Dabija, 29 July 1903 in Beirut, Ottoman Empire, died 2 December 1974 Phoenix, Arizona) was a French/Serbian-American anthropologist, artist, and writer, most notable as a French authority on Native Americans, and for his public art in the 1960s.

== Biography ==
Born in Beirut, Ottoman Empire of a French engineer father, Edouard Coze, and a mother, Sonia/Sofia Dabija, a Russian princess with lineage from old Serbian royalty, Coze grew acquainted with riding and roping as a young man. On his going to France, as a teenager he became co-founder of Scouts de France, the first French Scout program. Coze was the first French Wood Badger and a Chevalier de France, and served as editor of the Scout magazine.

During years of art training, an increasing fascination with cowboys and Native Americans led to four museum-sponsored anthropological expeditions to western Canada (1928–1932) and a book, Mœurs et histoire des Peaux-Rouges (1928, with Rene Thévenin), still in print as a standard work. Many of Coze's hundreds of collected artifacts now reside at the Royal Alberta Museum.

Coze moved to the United States circa 1938, in Pasadena, California since 1942, spending two years producing major educational murals at Mesa Verde National Park.

He acted as a technical adviser on the Hollywood films Uncertain Glory (1944) and Rogues' Regiment (1948) where he also had a small role. Coze acted as a researcher on The Razor's Edge (1946).

Settling in Phoenix, Arizona full-time in 1951, he founded an art school and created nine major pieces of public art in the city, including large multimedia installations at Phoenix Sky Harbor International Airport, Arizona Veterans Memorial Coliseum and other civic landmarks, most with Native themes. In 1971, Coze created a fountain for the Phoenix Indian Hospital.

Coze provided artistic designs for Arizona's celebration of 50 years of statehood, The Arizona Story, in 1962.

He died in 1974 and is buried in St. Francis Catholic Cemetery in Phoenix.

== Creative work ==
=== Painting and Illustration ===
Zuñi Shalako by Paul Coze

Coze created numerous paintings and drawings that were used as illustrations in Arizona Highways magazine; he often also wrote the article texts that were informed by his work as an anthropologist. His 19-page long feature article, Twenty-four Hours of Magic...The Zuñi Shalako, was illustrated with 13 paintings, 11 drawings, and four of his photographs. The illustrations and article describes the ten-foot high ceremonial masks that are worn by the Shalako dancers that represent the six directions of the world. The article tracks the 24 hour long ceremonial dance that takes place during the winter solstice each year, blessing the new homes at Zuni pueblo.

==== Murals ====
Coze produced a series of murals for Mesa Verde National Park. His 16 ft. high by 75 ft. wide mixed media mural, The Phoenix, was created in 1962 for the Phoenix Sky Harbor International Airport, and was created with 52 different materials; oil paint, gemstones, mosaic glass, vintage toys, aluminum sheeting, sand and shells on three panels. The mural was the first to be commissioned in Phoenix by public process; selected from five finalists.

Coze also produced murals for the Phoenix Civic Council chamber, the Arizona First American Title building, the Mayer-Heard building, and a four-story high mural for the Arizona Blue Cross Blue Shield headquarters. Coze created 14 murals in St. Thomas the Apostle church in Phoenix of the stations of the cross. In 1980 they were covered over with wallpaper by a parishioner in preparation for his daughter's marriage there. The murals were restored in 1994.

=== Photography ===
Coze was an ethnographic photographer; many of his works are in the Ethnology collection of the Royal Alberta Museum.

Other works

Coze was commissioned in 1958 to design and build a Phoenix sculpture for the Camelback Town & Country Village, now The Shops at Town & Country. He worked with Scottsdale based artists George Cavalliere II and Jos Maes to construct a 17 foot tall sculpture made of wrought iron and glass. It was put on display at the shopping center in December 1958. It has been moved around the shopping center twice, being put in its current location in 1988. During that move the sculpture had been painted white, much to the displeasure of Coze’s widow. In 2012, as part of renovations to the whole shopping center, Coze’s sculpture was restored to its original look and put back on display.

== Recognition ==
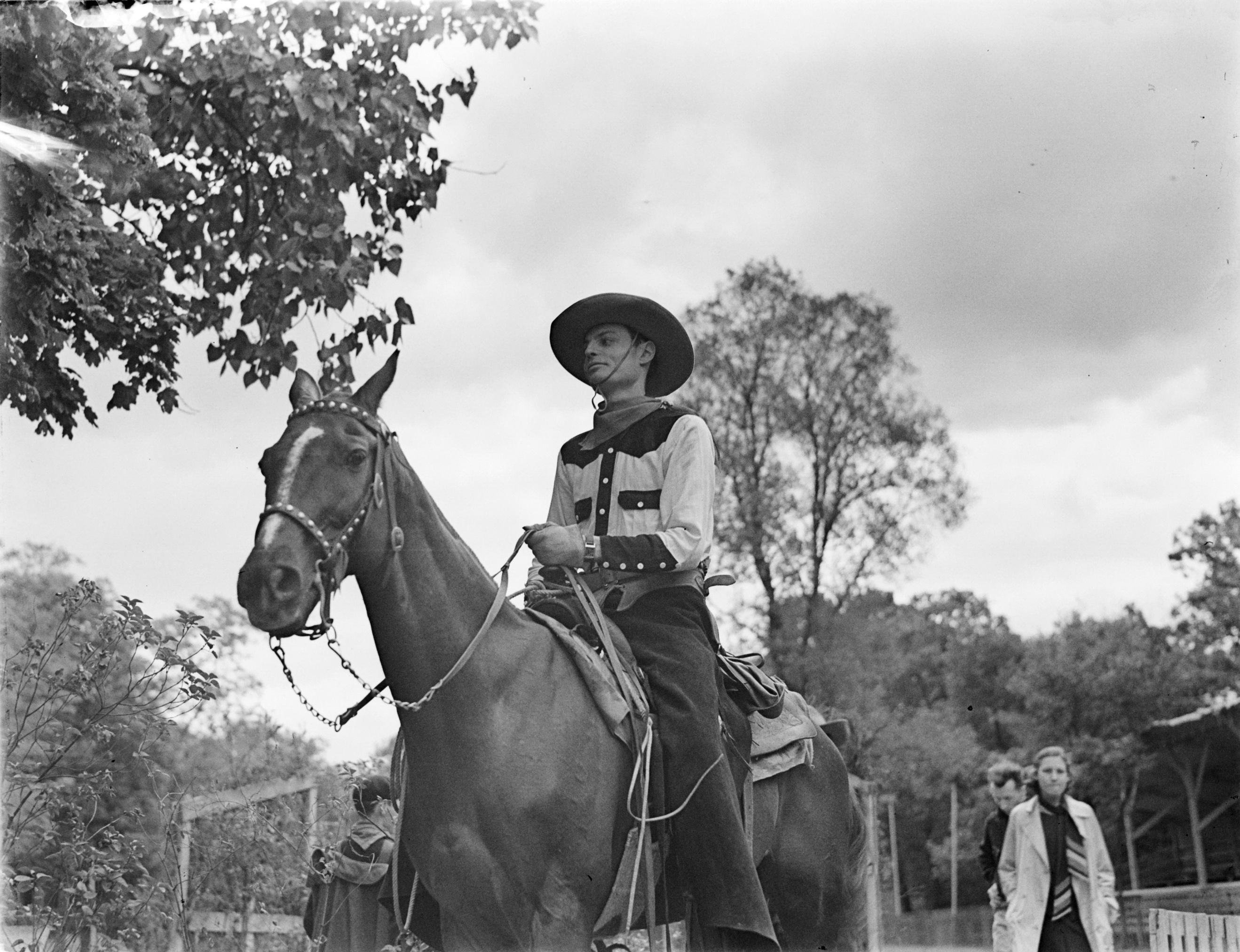
Paul Cozé on horseback with lasso

He published seven books and numerous articles for Arizona Highways magazine, was awarded the Chevalier de la Légion d'honneur in 1954, and was French consul for Phoenix for decades.

== Legacy ==
The Royal Alberta Museum in Canada hold the Paul Coze Ethnographic Collection, the Paul Coze Fonds contains 50 of his photographic negatives. The negatives were received from John P. Flaherty in 1994. The images document the Cree, Métis and Stoney Plain peoples in Saskatchewan and Alberta. During his lifetime, Coze amassed a private collection of ethnographic objects and materials from the First Nations people of the Canadian Plains and Subarctic regions. The Royal Alberta Museum in Edmonton holds 122 objects from Coze's personal collection including horse gear, model canoes, games, and garments. The Ethnology collection also includes 119 of Coze's paintings, 58 of his photographs and props from productions of Cercle Wakanda. Additionally the museum holds an archive of his writings and additional objects from Aboriginal life and objects that reflect attitudes towards Aboriginal peoples through the lens of Europeans.

== Gallery of ethnographic photographs by Paul Coze ==
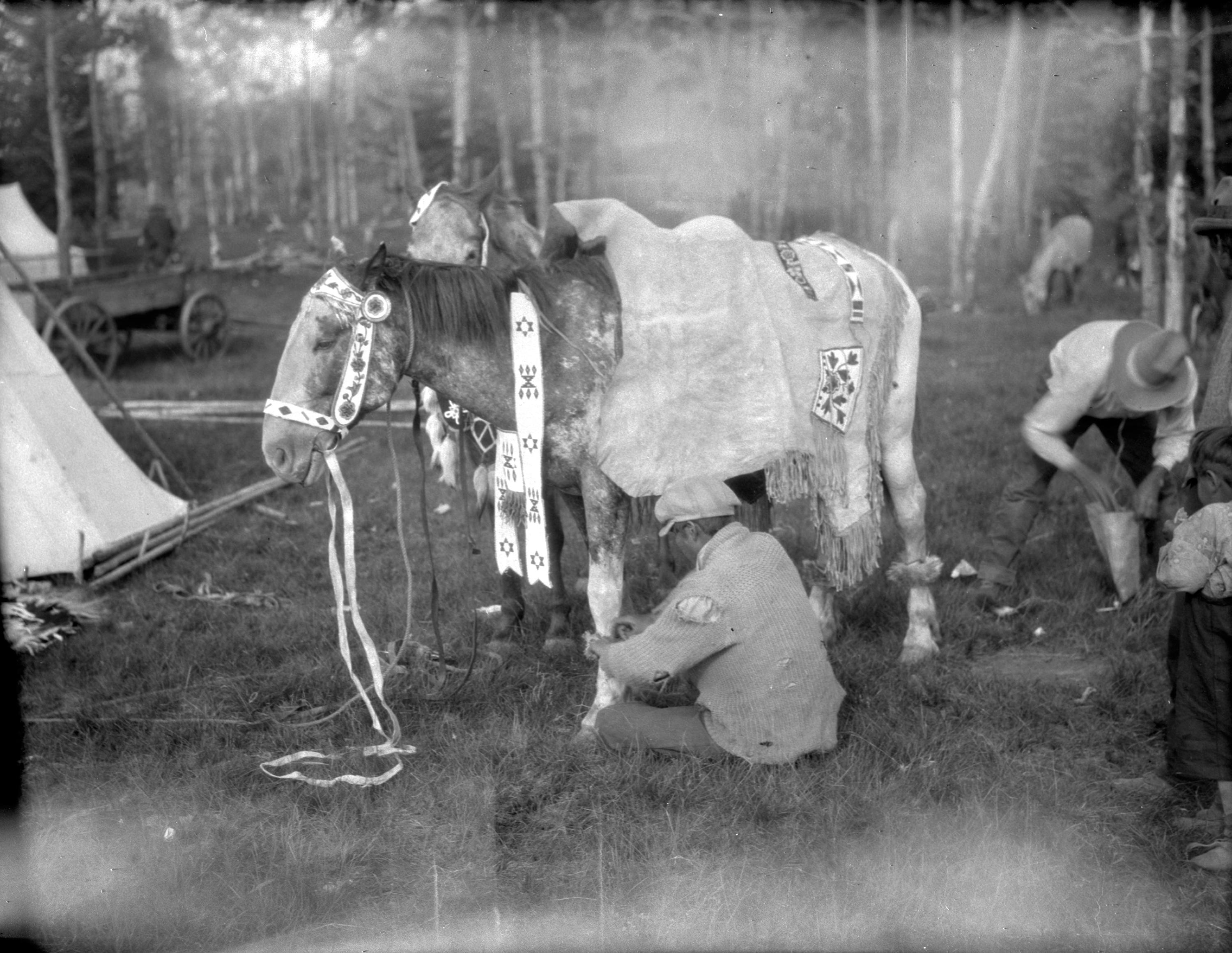
Dressing a horse for a ceremony, Nakoda summer camp near Banff, Alberta

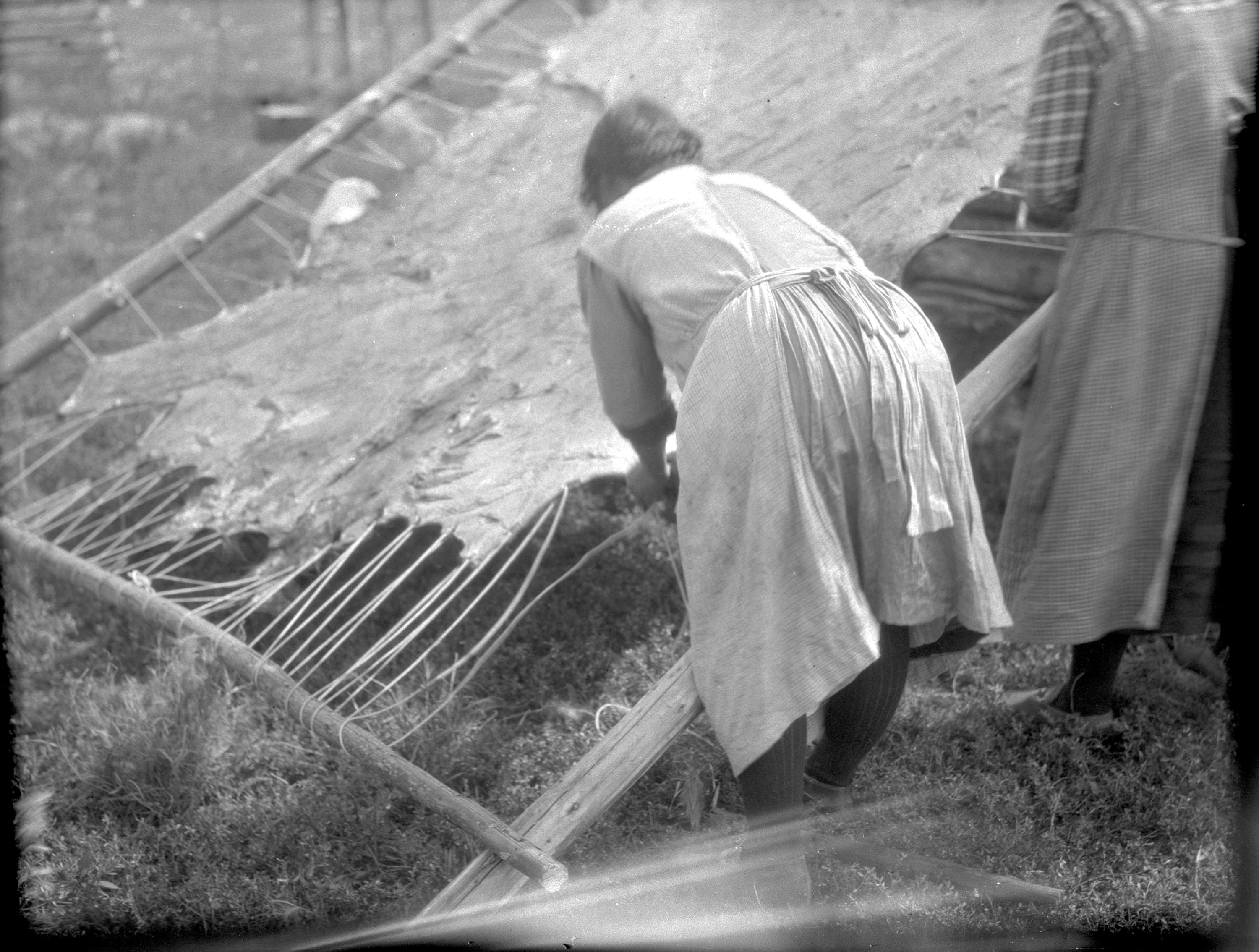
Cree women working on a large moose hide, Waterhen River area, Northern Saskatchewan

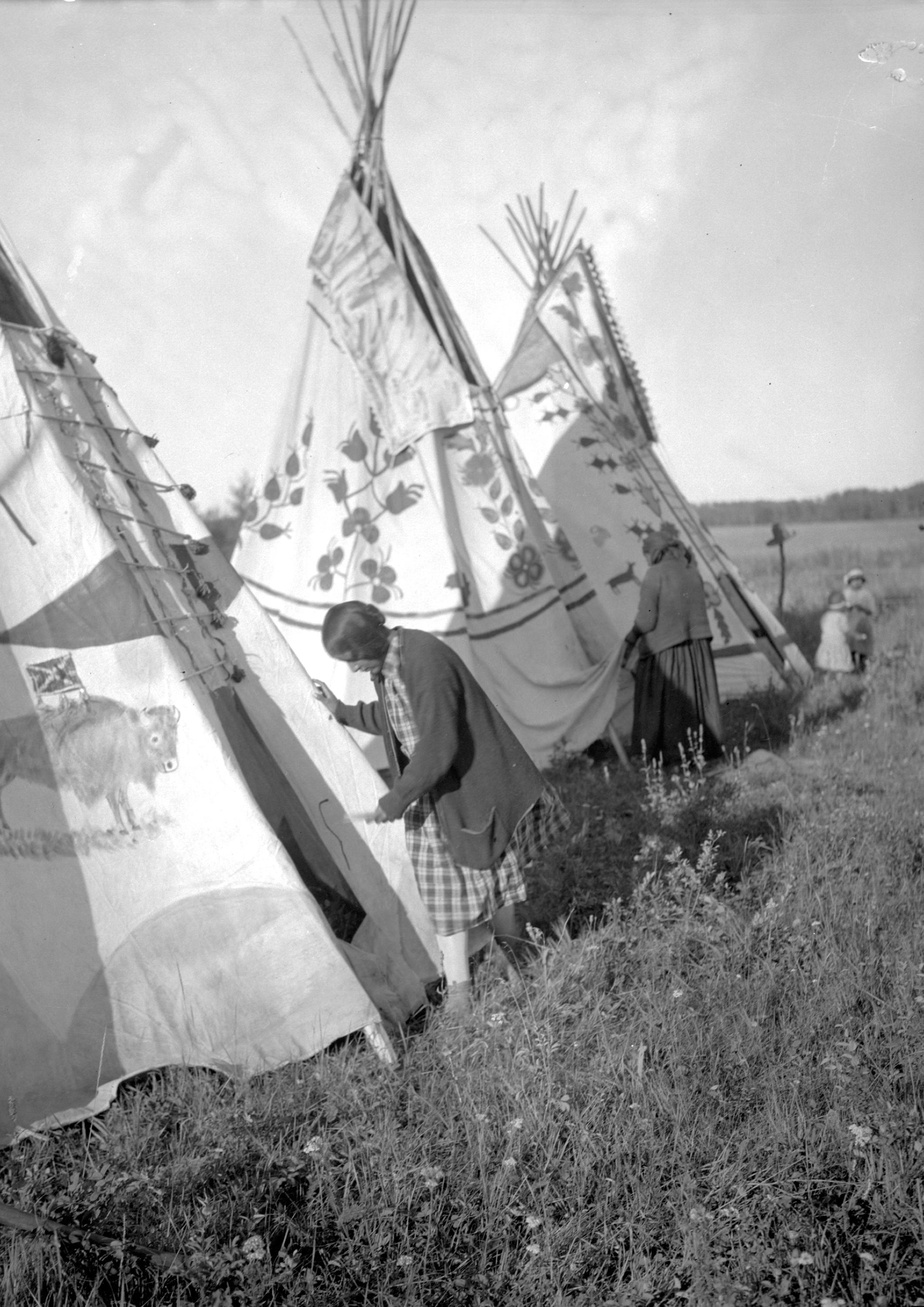
Women Arranging Their Tepees, Southern Saskatchewan

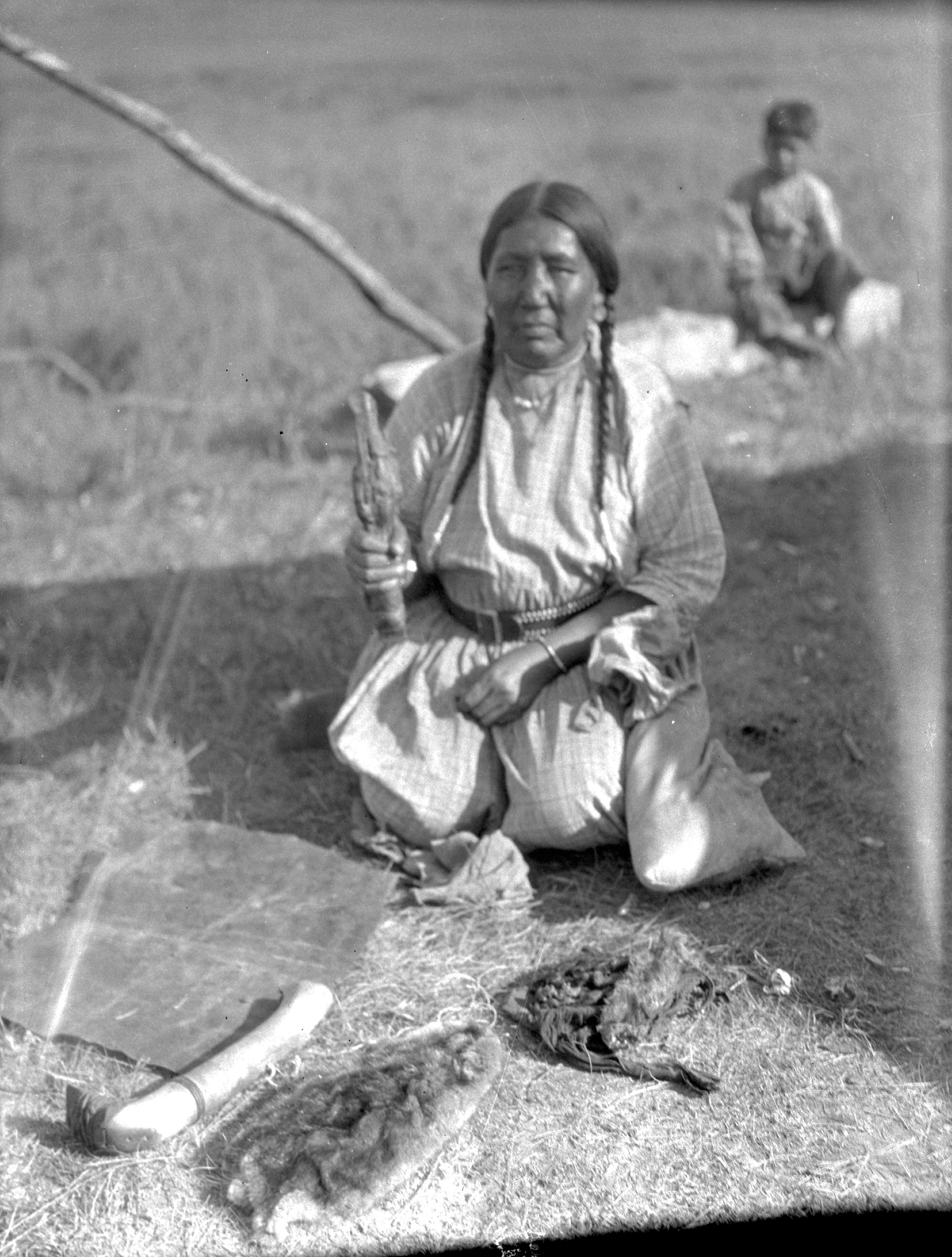
Unidentified Blackfoot woman with hide-scraping tools, Alberta

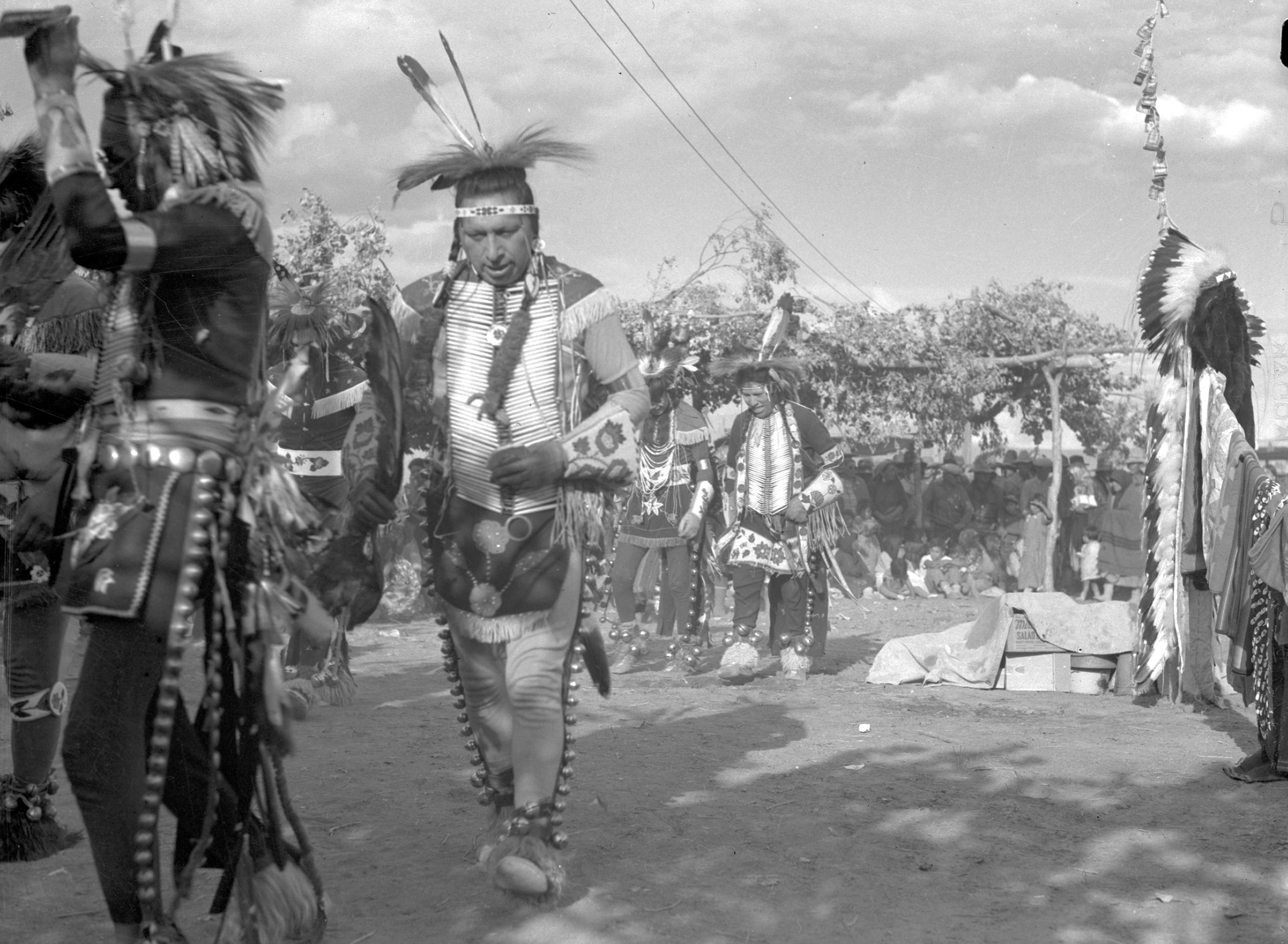
Dancers

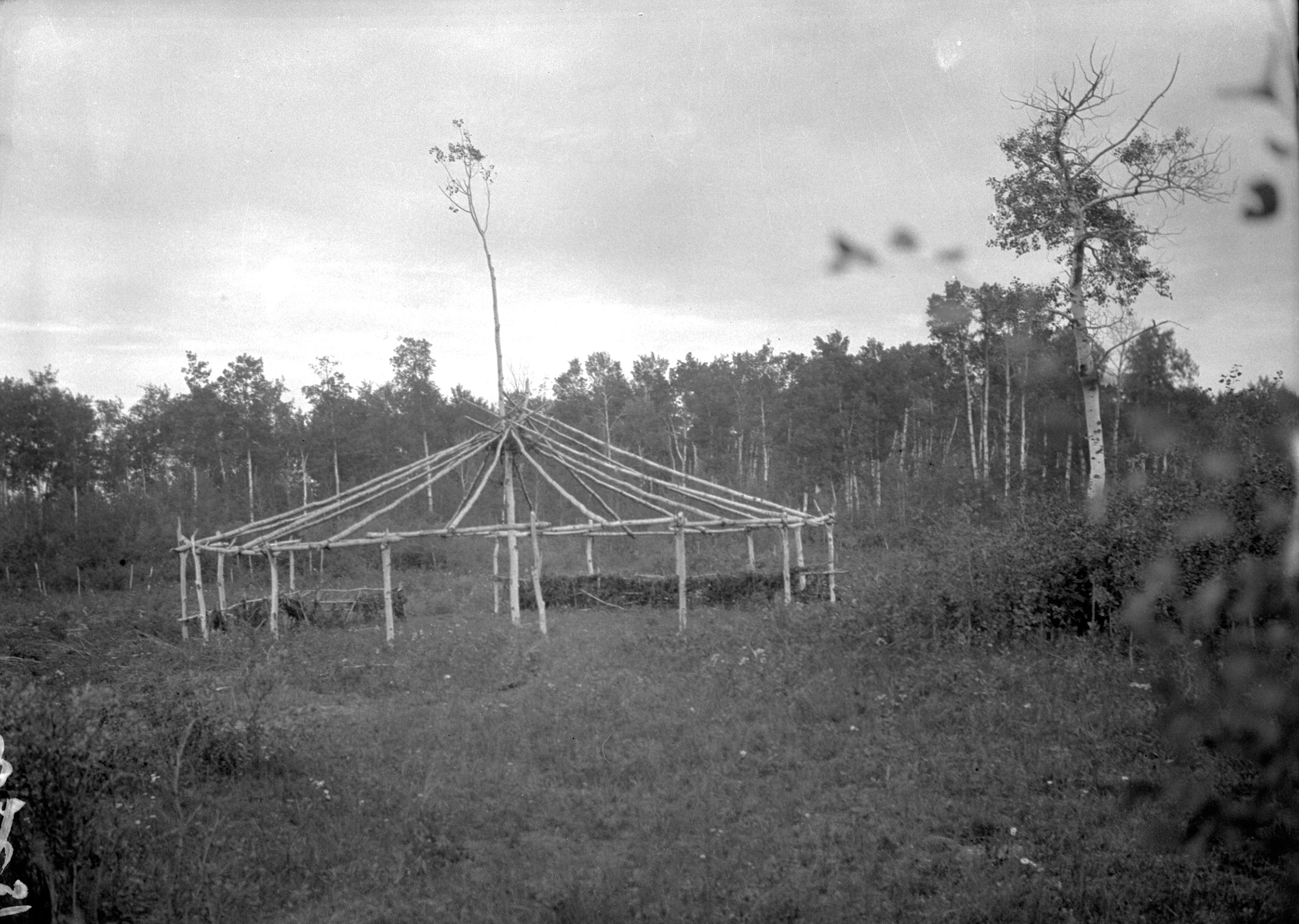
Circular Wood Frame Structure Used on Ceremonial Occasions, Waterhen River, Northern Saskatchewan

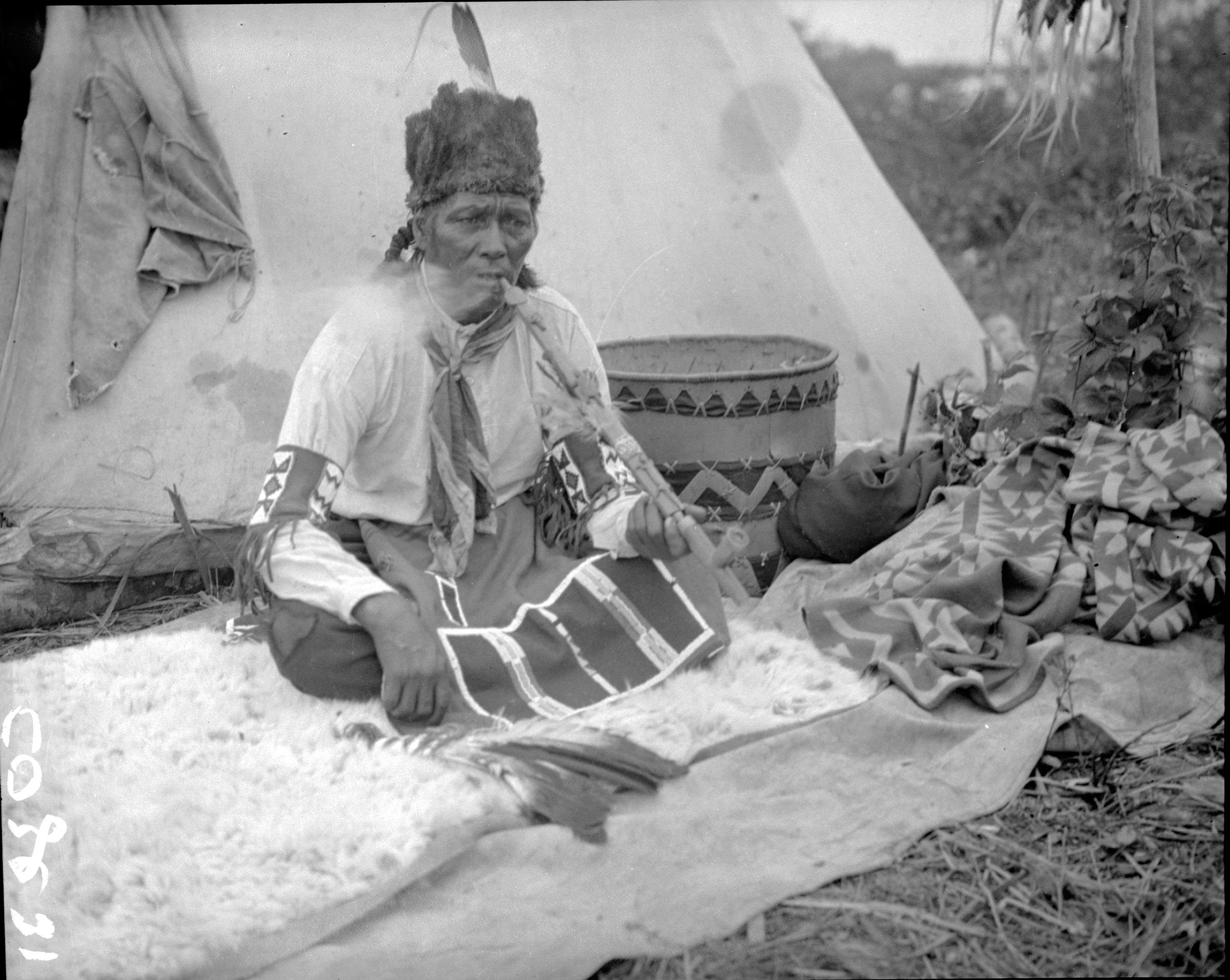
Ashatcheway, a Cree Medicine Man smoking an effigy pipe, Waterhen River Area, Northern Saskatchewan

== Sources ==
- short online biography from the Royal Alberta Museum
- article on paul coze in Phoenix Magazine
- Brief biography at AZCentral
- Souvenirs personnels de Paul Coze (in French)
