= Jacques Sevin =

French Jesuit priest

Venerable Jacques Sevin SJ
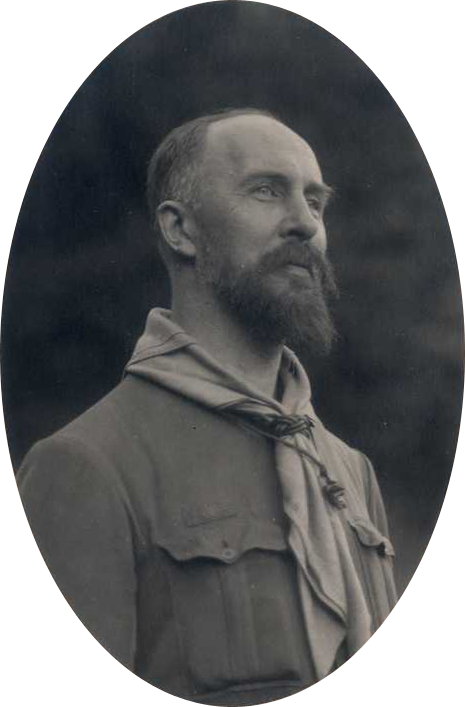
- Fr. Jacques Sevin

Personal details
- Born: 7 December 1882 Lille, France
- Died: 19 July 1951 (aged 68) Boran-sur-Oise, France
- Occupation: Catholic Priest (Society of Jesus)

Jacques Sevin SJ (7 December 1882 - 19 July 1951), was a French Jesuit known for his role in the introduction of Scouting to France.

== Biography ==
Sevin was born in Lille on 7 December 1882. In 1900 he joined the Society of Jesuits and was exempted from military service in 1902 and was ordained a priest in 1914. He remained in Belgium through the First World War and in 1916 he was appointed professor at the college of Tuquet in Mouscron, near the French border. Eight days after his arrival in Mouscron, the Germans took over the college as a military hospital. It was then that Father Sevin became involved in the Scouting movement, which was then gaining strength in the United Kingdom.

== Scouting ==
In 1913, impressed by the Scouting movement's educational method, he met with Robert Baden-Powell in London. Between 1917 and 1919, he wrote his classic book Scouting, a documentary study and applications and established the first Catholic Scout troop in Mouscron in 1918.

Scouting, being an import from Britain, was strongly disparaged in ecclesiastical circles of the time. But Father Sevin was able to demonstrate that it could be revised to correspond to a deep Christian vision of man. By the founding of the Scout Association of France in July 1920, he absorbed the experiences of Catholic Scouting that had existed in France since 1911 and became the architect of an alliance between Scouting on the model established by Lord Baden-Powell and the Christian Gospel. He began publishing the monthly newsletter Le Chef in 1921.

According to Mother Madeleine Bourcereau, "The meeting between the Scout method and intuitions of P. Sevin, has developed a pedagogy based on Gospel values, where each young person is encouraged to flourish and develop his or her personality by drawing out the latent talent within himself or herself. Father Sevin dedicated himself to making known the riches of scouting and all its educational and evangelical value — no easy task."

== Scout prayer ==
He set to music a prayer attributed to St. Ignatius of Loyola, which became the "Scout prayer":

Seigneur Jésus,
Apprenez-nous à être généreux,
A Vous servir comme Vous le méritez,
A donner sans compter,
A combattre sans souci des blessures,
A travailler sans chercher le repos,
A nous dépenser, sans attendre d'autre récompense
que celle de savoir que nous faisons Votre Sainte Volonté.

Translated:

Lord Jesus,
Teach us to be generous,
To serve You as You deserve,
To give without counting the cost,
To fight without fear of wounds,
To work without seeking rest,
To spend ourselves seeking no other reward
than knowing we do Your Holy Will.

== Beatification ==
The cause of beatification of the Servant of God was introduced in Rome in 1989. He was declared Venerable May 10, 2012.
