= Shooting at the 2011 Pan American Games – Men's 50 metre rifle prone =

Shooting – Men's 50 metre rifle prone at the 2011 Pan American Games
- Venue: Jalisco Hunting Club
- Dates: October 19
- Competitors: 28 from 17 nations

Medalists
Gold medal	Michael McPhail	United States
Silver medal	Alex Suligoy	Argentina
Bronze medal	Jason Parker	United States

The men's 50 metre rifle prone shooting event at the 2011 Pan American Games was held on October 19 at the Jalisco Hunting Club in Guadalajara. The defending Pan American Games champion is Thomas Tamas of the United States.

The event consisted of two rounds: a qualifier and a final. In the qualifier, each shooter fired 60 shots with a .22 Long Rifle at 50 metres distance from the prone position. Scores for each shot were in increments of 1, with a maximum score of 10.

The top 8 shooters in the qualifying round moved on to the final round. There, they fired an additional 10 shots. These shots scored in increments of .1, with a maximum score of 10.9. The total score from all 70 shots was used to determine final ranking.

With the second-place finish (the United States has reached its quota) Alex Suligoy of Argentina qualifies his country a quota spot for the men's 50 metre rifle prone event at the 2012 Summer Olympics in London, Great Britain.

== Schedule ==
All times are Central Standard Time (UTC-6).

Date	Time	Round
October 19, 2011	9:00	Qualification
October 19, 2011	12:00	Final

== Records ==
The existing world and Pan American Games records were as follows.

Qualification records
World record	Viatcheslav Botchkarev (URS); Stevan Pletikosić (YUG); Jean-Pierre Amat (FRA); Christian Klees (GER); Sergei Martynov (BLR); Thomas Tamas (USA); Sergei Martynov (BLR); Sergei Martynov (BLR); Petr Litvinchuk (BLR); Wolfram Waibel Jr. (AUT); Wolfram Waibel Jr. (AUT); Christian Lusch (GER); Eric Uptagrafft (USA); Valérian Sauveplane (FRA); Sergei Martynov (BLR); Sergei Martynov (BLR); Matthew Emmons (USA); Guy Starik (ISR)	600	Zagreb, Croatia; Munich, Germany; Havana, Cuba; Atlanta, United States; Munich, Germany; Barcelona, Spain; Buenos Aires, Argentina; Munich, Germany; Munich, Germany; Plzeň, Czech Republic; Sydney, Australia; Bangkok, Thailand; Fort Benning, United States; Fort Benning, United States; Munich, Germany; Guangzhou, China; Bangkok, Thailand; Munich, Germany	July 13, 1989; August 29, 1991; April 27, 1994; July 25, 1996; May 23, 1997; August 29, 1998; September 4, 1998; June 8, 2000; June 11, 2003; July 18, 2003; March 3, 2004; October 27, 2004; May 11, 2005; May 11, 2005; August 26, 2005; March 29, 2006; May 9, 2007; May 18, 2008
Pan American record	Thomas Tamas (USA)	598	Rio de Janeiro, Brazil	July 17, 2007

Final records
World record	Christian Klees (GER); Warren Potent (AUS)	704.8 (600+104.8); 704.8 (599+105.8)	Atlanta, United States; Beijing, China	July 25, 1996; April 18, 2008
Pan American record	Daryl Szarenski (USA)	703.0 (598+105.0)	Rio de Janeiro, Brazil	July 17, 2007

== Results ==
=== Qualification round ===
28 athletes from 17 countries competed.

Rank	Athlete	Country	1	2	3	4	5	6	Total	Notes
1	Michael McPhail	United States	98	99	99	98	98	99	591	Q
2	Alex Suligoy	Argentina	98	100	99	100	98	95	590	Q
3	Angel Velarte	Argentina	99	99	97	99	99	96	589	Q
4	Blas Ruiz	Mexico	99	99	97	99	99	96	589	Q
5	Jason Parker	United States	98	98	97	97	99	99	588	Q
6	Ned Gerad	Virgin Islands	98	98	98	99	98	97	588	Q
7	Gonzalo Moncada	Chile	100	99	100	94	96	98	587	Q
8	Julio Iemma	Venezuela	96	98	98	95	98	100	585	Q, QS-Off 51.9
9	Elias San Martin	Chile	98	97	99	94	99	98	585	QS-Off 48.9
10	Michael Dion	Canada	98	95	98	94	98	99	582	
11	Johannes Sauer	Canada	93	96	98	98	98	98	581	
12	Mauro Salles	Brazil	95	98	96	98	97	97	581	
13	Jose Luis Sanchez	Mexico	97	99	97	97	95	95	580	
14	Marlon Rolando Perez	Guatemala	95	97	98	100	96	94	580	
15	Bruno Heck	Brazil	97	98	97	96	94	97	579	
16	Cesar Tobon	Colombia	97	96	97	98	95	96	579	
17	Guido Farfan	Peru	98	97	99	95	94	95	578	
18	Raul Vargas	Venezuela	96	95	96	99	97	95	578	
19	Maykel Guerra	Cuba	97	98	94	96	97	95	577	
20	Cristian Morales	Bolivia	97	93	98	95	100	94	577	
21	Reynier Estopiñan	Cuba	95	97	97	95	96	96	576	
22	Hosman Duran	Dominican Republic	95	96	98	96	96	95	576	
23	Rafael Espinoza	El Salvador	96	97	98	97	95	93	576	
24	Walter Martinez	Nicaragua	93	93	97	96	99	95	573	
25	Alexander Rivera	Puerto Rico	96	96	99	96	91	93	571	
26	David D'Achiardi	Colombia	92	95	96	95	93	95	566	
27	Daniel Eduardo Vizcarra	Peru	96	94	95	97	96	49	527	DNF
	Octavo Sandoval	Guatemala	–	–	–	–	–	–	–	DSQ

=== Final ===
Rank	Athlete	Qual	1	2	3	4	5	6	7	8	9	10	Final	Total	Notes
1st place, gold medalist(s)	Michael McPhail (USA)	591	9.9	10.5	9.7	10.3	10.5	10.8	10.8	9.5	10.4	9.8	102.2	693.2	
2nd place, silver medalist(s)	Alex Suligoy (ARG)	590	9.8	10.4	10.4	8.7	9.9	10.2	10.5	10.6	10.9	10.1	101.5	691.5	
3rd place, bronze medalist(s)	Jason Parker (USA)	588	10.0	10.9	10.9	10.2	10.4	9.5	10.0	10.4	10.4	10.1	102.8	690.8	
4	Blas Ruiz (MEX)	589	10.4	9.9	9.9	9.9	10.7	10.1	10.2	9.3	10.4	10.3	101.1	690.1	
5	Angel Velarte (ARG)	589	9.7	10.5	9.6	10.3	10.7	10.2	9.7	9.4	10.1	10.1	100.3	689.3	
6	Ned Gerad (ISV)	588	10.0	9.2	9.8	10.8	9.6	10.6	10.5	10.1	10.4	9.8	100.8	688.8	
7	Julio Iemma (VEN)	585	9.5	10.7	10.4	9.7	10.7	10.4	9.5	10.2	9.9	10.6	101.6	686.6	
8	Gonzalo Moncada (CHI)	587	9.5	10.0	10.5	9.5	0.0	10.2	10.5	10.5	10.3	10.0	91.0	678.0	
