= Shooting at the 1996 Summer Olympics – Men's 50 metre rifle three positions =

Sports shooting at the Olympics

Men's 50 metre rifle three positions at the Games of the XXVI Olympiad
- Venue: Wolf Creek Shooting Complex
- Date: 27 July 1996
- Competitors: 45 from 30 nations
- Winning score: 1273.9 (OR)

Medalists
1st place, gold medalist(s)		Jean-Pierre Amat	France
2nd place, silver medalist(s)		Sergey Belyayev	Kazakhstan
3rd place, bronze medalist(s)		Wolfram Waibel	Austria

Men's 50 metre rifle three positions (then known as free rifle) was one of the fifteen shooting events at the 1996 Summer Olympics. Both Jean-Pierre Amat and Sergey Belyayev reached a new Olympic record of 1175 points in the qualification round; Amat shot the better final and won the gold medal.

== Qualification round ==
Rank	Athlete	Country	Prone	Stand	Kneel	Total	Notes
1	Jean-Pierre Amat	France	396	387	392	1175	Q OR
1	Sergey Belyayev	Kazakhstan	399	382	394	1175	Q OR
3	Goran Maksimović	FR Yugoslavia	394	387	392	1173	Q
4	Rob Harbison	United States	394	388	388	1170	Q
4	Wolfram Waibel, Jr.	Austria	394	389	387	1170	Q
6	Václav Bečvář	Czech Republic	398	381	389	1168	Q
7	Jozef Gönci	Slovakia	393	382	391	1166	Q
7	Sergei Martynov	Belarus	397	377	392	1166	Q
9	Rajmond Debevec	Slovenia	397	381	388	1166	
10	Glenn Dubis	United States	398	379	388	1165	
10	Maik Eckhardt	Germany	397	382	386	1165	
10	Ning Lijia	China	397	377	391	1165	
13	Thomas Farnik	Austria	393	382	389	1164	
13	Juha Hirvi	Finland	397	379	388	1164	
13	Artem Khadjibekov	Russia	393	384	387	1164	
13	Hrachya Petikyan	Armenia	396	379	389	1164	
13	Guy Starik	Israel	396	379	389	1164	
18	Milan Bakeš	Czech Republic	395	378	390	1163	
18	Vyacheslav Bochkarev	Russia	398	380	385	1163	
18	Nedžad Fazlija	Bosnia and Herzegovina	395	377	391	1163	
18	Lee Eun-chul	South Korea	395	377	391	1163	
22	Peter Gabrielsson	Sweden	387	385	390	1162	
22	Jaco Henn	South Africa	397	382	383	1162	
22	Robert Kraskowski	Poland	394	375	393	1162	
22	Boris Polak	Israel	398	379	385	1162	
26	Oleg Mykhaylov	Ukraine	396	382	383	1161	
27	Zsolt Vari	Hungary	393	374	393	1160	
28	Nils Petter Håkedal	Norway	398	377	383	1158	
28	Jens Harskov	Denmark	399	368	391	1158	
28	Anatoli Klimenko	Belarus	391	380	387	1158	
28	Masaru Yanagida	Japan	395	383	380	1158	
32	Tadeusz Czerwinski	Poland	396	375	386	1157	
32	Yuri Lomov	Kyrgyzstan	396	377	384	1157	
32	Andreas Zumbach	Switzerland	392	377	388	1157	
35	Roger Chassat	France	392	385	379	1156	
35	Stevan Pletikosić	FR Yugoslavia	398	369	389	1156	
37	Jorge González	Spain	399	368	388	1155	
37	Christian Klees	Germany	397	376	382	1155	
37	Naoki Kurita	Japan	400	374	381	1155	
40	Cha Young-chul	South Korea	393	375	386	1154	
41	Harald Stenvaag	Norway	395	380	378	1153	
42	Chen Xianjun	China	399	369	380	1148	
43	Michel Dion	Canada	396	365	384	1145	
44	Ángel Velarte	Argentina	392	363	387	1142	
45	Ricardo Rusticucci	Argentina	392	364	383	1139	

OR Olympic record – Q Qualified for final

== Final ==
Rank	Athlete	Qual	Final	Total	Shoot-off	Notes
1st place, gold medalist(s)	Jean-Pierre Amat (FRA)	1175	98.9	1273.9		OR
2nd place, silver medalist(s)	Sergey Belyayev (KAZ)	1175	97.3	1272.3		
3rd place, bronze medalist(s)	Wolfram Waibel (AUT)	1170	99.6	1269.6		
4	Goran Maksimović (YUG)	1173	95.8	1268.8		
5	Jozef Gönci (SVK)	1166	101.7	1267.7	10.0	
6	Rob Harbison (USA)	1170	97.7	1267.7	8.6	
7	Václav Bečvář (CZE)	1168	96.0	1264.0		
8	Sergei Martynov (BLR)	1166	97.9	1263.9		

OR Olympic record

== Sources ==
- Olympic Report Atlanta 1996 Volume III: The Competition Results (PDF).
