= Shooting at the 1996 Summer Olympics – Men's 50 metre rifle prone =

Sports shooting at the Olympics

Men's 50 metre rifle prone at the Games of the XXVI Olympiad
- Venue: Wolf Creek Shooting Complex
- Date: 25 July 1996
- Competitors: 52 from 36 nations
- Winning score: 704.8 WR

Medalists
1st place, gold medalist(s)		Christian Klees	Germany
2nd place, silver medalist(s)		Sergey Belyayev	Kazakhstan
3rd place, bronze medalist(s)		Jozef Gönci	Slovakia

Men's 50 metre rifle prone (then known as free rifle) was one of the fifteen shooting events at the 1996 Summer Olympics. Christian Klees shot a perfect 600 in the qualification round and set a new World record after 104.8 points (of maximum 109.0) in the final. With an even better final round, Sergey Belyayev surpassed Jozef Gönci to win the silver medal.

== Qualification round ==
Rank	Athlete	Country	Score	Notes
1	Christian Klees	Germany	600	Q EWR OR
2	Jozef Gönci	Slovakia	599	Q
3	Sergei Martynov	Belarus	598	Q
4	Sergey Belyayev	Kazakhstan	598	Q
5	Bill Meek	United States	597	Q
6	Jorge González	Spain	597	Q
7	Lee Eun-chul	South Korea	596	Q (6th: 100)
8	Milan Mach	Czech Republic	596	Q (6th: 99)
9	Rajmond Debevec	Slovenia	596	(6th: 98)
9	Sergei Kovalenko	Russia	596	(6th: 98)
11	Václav Bečvář	Czech Republic	595	
11	Robert Kraskowski	Poland	595	
11	Li Wenjie	China	595	
11	Yuri Lomov	Kyrgyzstan	595	
11	Oleg Mykhaylov	Ukraine	595	
11	Igor Pirekeev	Turkmenistan	595	
11	Stevan Pletikosić	FR Yugoslavia	595	
11	Bernd Rücker	Germany	595	
11	Zsolt Vari	Hungary	595	
20	Chen Xianjun	China	594	
20	Tadeusz Czerwinski	Poland	594	
20	Artem Khadjibekov	Russia	594	
20	Kurt Koch	Switzerland	594	
20	Goran Maksimović	FR Yugoslavia	594	
20	Boris Polak	Israel	594	
26	Jens Harskov	Denmark	593	
26	Jaco Henn	South Africa	593	
26	Guy Starik	Israel	593	
26	Andreas Zumbach	Switzerland	593	
30	Michel Bury	France	592	
30	Michel Dion	Canada	592	
30	Naoki Kurita	Japan	592	
30	Georgi Nekhayev	Belarus	592	
30	Harald Stenvaag	Norway	592	
30	Eric Uptagrafft	United States	592	
36	Cha Young-chul	South Korea	591	
36	Nils Petter Håkedal	Norway	591	
36	Stephen Petterson	New Zealand	591	
39	Roger Chassat	France	590	
39	Torben Grimmel	Denmark	590	
39	Wolfram Waibel	Austria	590	
42	Thomas Farnik	Austria	589	
42	Peter Gabrielsson	Sweden	589	
42	Juha Hirvi	Finland	589	
42	Bruce Meredith	Virgin Islands	589	
42	Masaru Yanagida	Japan	589	
47	Ralph Rodriguez	Puerto Rico	588	
48	Jonathan Stern	Great Britain	587	
49	Anuj Desai	Kenya	586	
50	Khalaf Al Khatri	Oman	584	
51	Nedžad Fazlija	Bosnia and Herzegovina	583	
52	Gary Duff	Ireland	580	

EWR Equalled World record – OR Olympic record – Q Qualified for final

== Final ==
Rank	Athlete	Qual	Final	Total	Notes
1st place, gold medalist(s)	Christian Klees (GER)	600	104.8	704.8	WR OR
2nd place, silver medalist(s)	Sergey Belyayev (KAZ)	598	105.3	703.3	
3rd place, bronze medalist(s)	Jozef Gönci (SVK)	599	102.9	701.9	
4	Jorge González (ESP)	597	104.7	701.7	
5	Milan Mach (CZE)	596	104.9	700.9	
6	Sergei Martynov (BLR)	598	101.6	699.6	
7	Lee Eun-chul (KOR)	596	103.1	699.1	
8	Bill Meek (USA)	597	101.9	698.9	

OR Olympic record – WR World record

== Sources ==
- Olympic Report Atlanta 1996 Volume III: The Competition Results (PDF).
