= Shooting at the 2000 Summer Olympics – Men's 50 metre rifle prone =

Men's 50 metre rifle prone at the Games of the XXVII Olympiad
- Venue: Sydney International Shooting Centre
- Date: 21 September 2000
- Competitors: 53 from 37 nations
- Winning score: 701.3

Medalists
| 1st place, gold medalist(s) | | Jonas Edman | Sweden |
| 2nd place, silver medalist(s) | | Torben Grimmel | Denmark |
| 3rd place, bronze medalist(s) | | Sergei Martynov | Belarus |

Men's 50 metre rifle prone at the 2000 Summer Olympics was held on 21 September. The qualification round of 60 shots was fired between 09:30 and 10:45 Australian Eastern Standard Time (UTC+10), and the final round of 10 additional shots at 11:30. Jonas Edman, previously more well known as a 300 metre shooter, took a one-point lead in the qualification round, and eventually won by a 0.9-point margin.

== Records ==
The existing world and Olympic records were as follows.

Qualification records
| World record | Viatcheslav Botchkarev (URS); Stevan Pletikosić (YUG); Jean-Pierre Amat (FRA); Christian Klees (GER); Sergei Martynov (BLR); Thomas Tamas (USA); Sergei Martynov (BLR); Sergei Martynov (BLR) | 600 | Zagreb, Croatia; Munich, Germany; Havana, Cuba; Atlanta, United States; Munich, Germany; Barcelona, Spain; Buenos Aires, Argentina; Munich, Germany | 13 July 1989; 29 August 1991; 27 April 1994; 25 July 1996; 23 May 1997; 29 August 1998; 4 September 1998; 8 June 2000 |
| Olympic record | Christian Klees (GER) | 600 | Atlanta, United States | 25 July 1996 |

Final records
| World record | Christian Klees (GER) | 704.8 (600+104.8) | Atlanta, United States | 25 July 1996 |
| Olympic record | Christian Klees (GER) | 704.8 (600+104.8) | Atlanta, United States | 25 July 1996 |

== Qualification round ==
| Rank | Athlete | Country | Score | Notes |
|---|---|---|---|---|
| 1 | Jonas Edman | Sweden | 599 | Q |
| 2 | Sergei Martynov | Belarus | 598 | Q |
| 3 | Václav Bečvář | Czech Republic | 597 | Q |
| 4 | Igor Pirekeev | Turkmenistan | 597 | Q |
| 5 | Torben Grimmel | Denmark | 597 | Q |
| 6 | Artem Khadjibekov | Russia | 597 | Q |
| 7 | Maik Eckhardt | Germany | 596 | Q (6th: 100) |
| 8 | Philippe Joualin | France | 596 | Q (6th: 100) |
| 9 | Mario Knögler | Austria | 596 | (6th: 98) |
| 10 | Marco De Nicolo | Italy | 595 | |
| 10 | Glenn Dubis | United States | 595 | |
| 10 | Wayne Sorensen | Canada | 595 | |
| 13 | Roger Hansson | Sweden | 594 | |
| 13 | Sergei Kovalenko | Russia | 594 | |
| 13 | Ning Lijia | China | 594 | |
| 13 | Péter Sidi | Hungary | 594 | |
| 13 | Harald Stenvaag | Norway | 594 | |
| 13 | Thomas Tamas | United States | 594 | |
| 19 | Espen Berg-Knutsen | Norway | 593 | |
| 19 | Rajmond Debevec | Slovenia | 593 | |
| 19 | Jorge González | Spain | 593 | |
| 19 | Timothy Lowndes | Australia | 593 | |
| 19 | Georgy Nekhaev | Belarus | 593 | |
| 19 | Warren Potent | Australia | 593 | |
| 25 | Hilal Al Rasheedi | Oman | 592 | |
| 25 | Michael Babb | Great Britain | 592 | |
| 25 | Juha Hirvi | Finland | 592 | |
| 25 | Swen Schuller | Germany | 592 | |
| 25 | Guy Starik | Israel | 592 | |
| 30 | Artur Ayvazyan | Ukraine | 591 | |
| 30 | Jean-Pierre Amat | France | 591 | |
| 30 | Oleg Mykhaylov | Ukraine | 591 | |
| 30 | Stevan Pletikosić | FR Yugoslavia | 591 | |
| 34 | Nedžad Fazlija | Bosnia and Herzegovina | 590 | |
| 35 | Naoki Kurita | Japan | 589 | |
| 35 | Yuri Lomov | Kyrgyzstan | 589 | |
| 35 | Goran Maksimović | FR Yugoslavia | 589 | |
| 38 | Bae Sung-duk | South Korea | 588 | |
| 38 | Roger Caron | Canada | 588 | |
| 38 | Radim Novak | Czech Republic | 588 | |
| 41 | Roberto José Elias Orozco | Mexico | 587 | |
| 41 | Lee Eun-chul | South Korea | 587 | |
| 41 | Alan Lewis | Ireland | 587 | |
| 44 | Thomas Farnik | Austria | 585 | |
| 44 | Jaco Henn | South Africa | 585 | |
| 46 | Bruce Meredith | Virgin Islands | 584 | |
| 47 | Corne Basson | South Africa | 583 | |
| 47 | Varavut Majchacheep | Thailand | 583 | |
| 49 | Pablo Álvarez | Argentina | 582 | |
| 50 | Mufid Allawanseh | Jordan | 581 | |
| 51 | Tevarit Majchacheep | Thailand | 580 | |
| 52 | Ralph Rodríguez | Puerto Rico | 578 | |
| 53 | Mohamad Mahfoud | Syria | 575 | |
| | Jozef Gönci | Slovakia | | DNS |
| | Hou Yannan | China | | DNS |

DNS Did not start – Q Qualified for final

== Final ==
| Rank | Athlete | Qual | 1 | 2 | 3 | 4 | 5 | 6 | 7 | 8 | 9 | 10 | Final | Total | Shoot-off |
|---|---|---|---|---|---|---|---|---|---|---|---|---|---|---|---|
| 1st place, gold medalist(s) | Jonas Edman (SWE) | 599 | 10.3 | 10.1 | 10.5 | 10.3 | 10.4 | 10.0 | 10.3 | 10.0 | 10.2 | 10.2 | 102.3 | 701.3 | |
| 2nd place, silver medalist(s) | Torben Grimmel (DEN) | 597 | 10.5 | 9.9 | 10.9 | 10.8 | 9.9 | 9.5 | 10.4 | 10.4 | 10.6 | 10.5 | 103.4 | 700.4 | |
| 3rd place, bronze medalist(s) | Sergei Martynov (BLR) | 598 | 9.8 | 10.2 | 10.1 | 9.9 | 10.6 | 10.2 | 10.1 | 10.6 | 10.5 | 10.3 | 102.3 | 700.3 | |
| 4 | Maik Eckhardt (GER) | 596 | 10.4 | 10.3 | 10.3 | 10.5 | 10.6 | 10.3 | 10.5 | 10.4 | 10.0 | 10.5 | 103.8 | 699.8 | |
| 5 | Václav Bečvář (CZE) | 597 | 10.4 | 10.5 | 10.4 | 9.4 | 10.4 | 10.6 | 10.5 | 10.4 | 10.1 | 10.0 | 102.7 | 699.7 | |
| 6 | Artem Khadjibekov (RUS) | 597 | 10.7 | 10.5 | 10.2 | 10.6 | 9.5 | 10.1 | 10.5 | 10.0 | 10.5 | 9.6 | 102.2 | 699.2 | 10.6 |
| 7 | Igor Pirekeev (TKM) | 597 | 10.5 | 10.5 | 10.0 | 10.2 | 10.1 | 9.6 | 10.7 | 9.9 | 10.6 | 10.1 | 102.2 | 699.2 | 10.2 |
| 8 | Philippe Joualin (FRA) | 596 | 10.1 | 10.2 | 9.9 | 10.1 | 10.4 | 10.8 | 10.7 | 10.0 | 10.7 | 10.1 | 103.0 | 699.0 | |

== Sources ==
- Official Report of the XXVII Olympiad — Shooting (PDF).
