= Shooting at the 1996 Summer Olympics – Men's 10 metre air rifle =

Sports shooting at the Olympics

Men's 10 metre air rifle prone at the Games of the XXVI Olympiad
- Venue: Wolf Creek Shooting Complex
- Date: 22 July 1996
- Competitors: 44 from 31 nations
- Winning score: 695.7 (OR)

Medalists
1st place, gold medalist(s)		Artem Khadjibekov	Russia
2nd place, silver medalist(s)		Wolfram Waibel	Austria
3rd place, bronze medalist(s)		Jean-Pierre Amat	France

Men's 10 metre air rifle was one of the fifteen shooting events at the 1996 Summer Olympics. Artem Khadjibekov defeated Wolfram Waibel in the final to win the gold medal.

== Qualification round ==
Rank	Athlete	Country	Score	Notes
1	Wolfram Waibel	Austria	596	Q OR
2	Rob Harbison	United States	594	Q
3	Artem Khadjibekov	Russia	594	Q
4	Rajmond Debevec	Slovenia	591	Q (6th: 100)
5	Yevgeni Aleinikov	Russia	591	Q (6th: 100)
6	Jean-Pierre Amat	France	591	Q (6th: 99)
7	Leif Steinar Rolland	Norway	591	Q (6th: 99)
8	Milan Bakeš	Czech Republic	591	Q (6th: 98)
9	Nils Petter Håkedal	Norway	591	(6th: 97)
9	Maik Eckhardt	Germany	591	(6th: 95)
11	Anatoli Klimenko	Belarus	590	
11	Petr Kůrka	Czech Republic	590	
11	Lee Eun-chul	South Korea	590	
11	Lim Young-sueb	South Korea	590	
15	Juha Hirvi	Finland	589	
15	Goran Maksimović	FR Yugoslavia	589	
15	Nemanja Mirosavljev	FR Yugoslavia	589	
18	Franck Badiou	France	588	
18	Dieter Grabner	Austria	588	
18	Ning Lijia	China	588	
18	Johann Riederer	Germany	588	
22	Li Haicong	China	587	
22	Yuri Lomov	Kyrgyzstan	587	
22	Masaru Yanagida	Japan	587	
25	Nedžad Fazlija	Bosnia and Herzegovina	586	
26	Georgy Nekhayev	Belarus	585	
26	Ricardo Rusticucci	Argentina	585	
28	Jozef Gönci	Slovakia	584	
28	Andreas Zumbach	Switzerland	584	
30	Robert Kraskowski	Poland	583	
30	Jean-François Senecal	Canada	583	
32	Oleg Mykhaylov	Ukraine	582	
33	Boris Polak	Israel	581	
33	Saiful Alam	Bangladesh	581	
33	Zsolt Vari	Hungary	581	
36	Darko Naseski	Macedonia	580	
37	Khalaf Al Khatri	Oman	578	
38	Sergey Belyayev	Kazakhstan	577	
38	Naoki Kurita	Japan	577	
38	Ángel Velarte	Argentina	577	
41	Glenn Dubis	United States	576	
42	Jorge González	Spain	575	
43	Nabil Abdul Tahlak	United Arab Emirates	569	
44	Walter Martínez	Nicaragua	566	

OR Olympic record – Q Qualified for final

== Final ==
Rank	Athlete	Qual	Final	Total	Notes
1st place, gold medalist(s)	Artem Khadjibekov (RUS)	594	101.7	695.7	OR
2nd place, silver medalist(s)	Wolfram Waibel (AUT)	596	99.2	695.2	
3rd place, bronze medalist(s)	Jean-Pierre Amat (FRA)	591	102.1	693.1	
4	Yevgeni Aleinikov (RUS)	591	101.9	692.9	
5	Leif Steinar Rolland (NOR)	591	101.5	692.5	
6	Rajmond Debevec (SLO)	591	101.1	692.1	
7	Rob Harbison (USA)	594	97.8	691.8	
8	Milan Bakeš (CZE)	591	99.5	690.5	

OR Olympic record

== Sources ==
- Olympic Report Atlanta 1996 Volume III: The Competition Results (PDF).
