= Shooting at the 1992 Summer Olympics – Men's 10 metre air rifle =

Sports shooting at the Olympics

Men's 10 metre air rifle at the Games of the XXV Olympiad
- Venue: Mollet del Vallès
- Competitors: 44 from 28 nations
- Winning score: 695.3 (OR)

Medalists
1st place, gold medalist(s)		Yuri Fedkin	Unified Team
2nd place, silver medalist(s)		Franck Badiou	France
3rd place, bronze medalist(s)		Johann Riederer	Germany

Men's 10 metre air rifle was one of the thirteen shooting events at the 1992 Summer Olympics. It was the first Olympic competition after the introduction of the new target in 1989, and thus two Olympic records were set, both by the new Olympic champion, Yuri Fedkin.

== Qualification round ==
Rank	Athlete	Country	Score	Notes
1	Yuri Fedkin	Unified Team	593	Q OR
2	Goran Maksimović	Independent Olympic Participants	592	Q
3	Franck Badiou	France	591	Q
4	Chae Keun-bae	South Korea	590	Q
5	Robert Foth	United States	590	Q
6	Thomas Farnik	Austria	590	Q
7	Jean-Pierre Amat	France	590	Q
8	Johann Riederer	Germany	590	Q
9	Rajmond Debevec	Slovenia	589	
10	Aleksandr Zlydenny	Unified Team	589	
11	David Johnson	United States	589	
11	Wolfram Waibel	Austria	589	
13	Enrique Claverol	Spain	588	
13	Robert Kraskowski	Poland	588	
13	Petr Kůrka	Czechoslovakia	588	
13	Matthias Stich	Germany	588	
13	Zhang Yingzhou	China	588	
18	Nemanja Mirosavljev	Independent Olympic Participants	587	
18	Harald Stenvaag	Norway	587	
18	Masaru Yanagida	Japan	587	
21	Jorge González	Spain	586	
21	Ji Jong-gu	South Korea	586	
21	Dalimil Nejezchleba	Czechoslovakia	586	
21	Attila Záhonyi	Hungary	586	
25	Jari Pälve	Finland	585	
25	Jack van Bekhoven	Netherlands	585	
27	Nils Petter Håkedal	Norway	584	
27	Juha Hirvi	Finland	584	
27	Ryohei Koba	Japan	584	
27	Jean-Claude Kremer	Luxembourg	584	
31	Olivér Nandor Gáspár	Hungary	583	
31	Samarn Jongsuk	Thailand	583	
31	Stoyan Stamenov	Bulgaria	583	
34	Du Long	China	582	
35	Guy Lorion	Canada	580	
35	Andi Zumbach	Switzerland	580	
37	Nigel Ian Wallace	Great Britain	579	
38	Jean-François Sénécal	France	578	
39	Josef Brendle	Liechtenstein	576	
39	Ulrich Minder	Switzerland	576	
41	Emerito Concepción	Philippines	573	
42	Hugo Romero	Ecuador	564	
43	Giuliano Ceccoli	San Marino	561	
44	Ricardo Rusticucci	Argentina	560	

OR Olympic record – Q Qualified for final

== Final ==
Rank	Athlete	Qual	Final	Total	Notes
1st place, gold medalist(s)	Yuri Fedkin (EUN)	593	102.3	695.3	OR
2nd place, silver medalist(s)	Franck Badiou (FRA)	591	100.9	691.9	
3rd place, bronze medalist(s)	Johann Riederer (GER)	590	101.7	691.7	
4	Jean-Pierre Amat (FRA)	590	101.6	691.6	
5	Goran Maksimović (IOP)	592	98.6	690.6	
6	Thomas Farnik (AUT)	590	100.2	690.2	
7	Robert Foth (USA)	590	99.4	689.4	
8	Chae Keun-bae (KOR)	590	97.8	687.8	

OR Olympic record

== Sources ==
- Games of the XXV Olympiad Barcelona 1992: The results (PDF).
