= Shooting at the 2012 Summer Olympics – Men's 50 metre rifle prone =

Men's 50 metre rifle prone at the Games of the XXX Olympiad
- Venue: Royal Artillery Barracks
- Date: 3 August 2012
- Competitors: 50 from 34 nations
- Winning score: 705.5 WR

Medalists
1st place, gold medalist(s)		Sergei Martynov	Belarus
2nd place, silver medalist(s)		Lionel Cox	Belgium
3rd place, bronze medalist(s)		Rajmond Debevec	Slovenia

The Men's 50 metre rifle prone event at the 2012 Olympic Games took place on 3 August 2012 at the Royal Artillery Barracks.

The event consisted of two rounds: a qualifier and a final. In the qualifier, each shooter fired 60 shots with a .22 Long Rifle at 50 metres distance from the prone position. Scores for each shot were in increments of 1, with a maximum score of 10.

The top 8 shooters in the qualifying round moved on to the final round. There, they fired an additional 10 shots. These shots were scored in increments of .1, with a maximum score of 10.9. The total score from all 70 shots were used to determine final ranking.

== Records ==
Prior to this competition, the existing world and Olympic records were as follows.

Qualification records
World record	Viatcheslav Botchkarev (URS)	600	Zagreb, Croatia	13 July 1989
Olympic record	Christian Klees (GER)	600	Atlanta, United States of America	25 July 1996

Final records
World record	Christian Klees (GER)	704.8	Atlanta, United States of America	25 July 1996
Olympic record	Christian Klees (GER)	704.8	Atlanta, United States of America	25 July 1996

== Qualification round ==
Rank	Athlete	Country	1	2	3	4	5	6	Total	Inner 10s	Notes
1	Sergei Martynov	Belarus	100	100	100	100	100	100	600	53	WR
2	Lionel Cox	Belgium	100	99	100	100	100	100	599	49	
3	Rajmond Debevec	Slovenia	100	99	99	100	99	99	596	42	
4	Daniel Brodmeier	Germany	98	99	100	100	99	99	595	41	Shoot-off: 52.3
5	Han Jin-Seop	South Korea	99	99	99	100	99	99	595	42	Shoot-off: 52.2
6	Niccolò Campriani	Italy	100	99	99	99	98	100	595	42	Shoot-off: 51.7
7	Joydeep Karmakar	India	99	98	100	98	100	100	595	37	Shoot-off: 51.6
8	Bojan Durković	Croatia	97	99	100	99	100	100	595	33	Shoot-off: 51.6
9	Michael McPhail	United States	99	99	99	100	99	99	595	39	Shoot-off: 51.3
10	Nemanja Mirosavljev	Serbia	100	99	100	97	99	100	595	34	Shoot-off: 51.0
11	Péter Sidi	Hungary	100	100	99	98	100	98	595	39	Shoot-off: 50.0
12	Artem Khadjibekov	Russia	98	100	99	100	99	99	595	41	Shoot-off: 49.6
13	Odd Arne Brekne	Norway	100	99	99	99	99	98	594	47	
14	Marcel Bürge	Switzerland	99	99	100	98	99	99	594	43	
15	Kim Hak-Man	South Korea	98	99	100	98	100	99	594	40	
16	Eric Uptagrafft	United States	98	98	100	98	100	100	594	34	
17	Jonathan Hammond	Great Britain	99	100	98	99	98	99	593	42	
18	Gagan Narang	India	98	100	100	98	97	100	593	34	
19	Sergei Kovalenko	Russia	99	98	100	98	100	98	593	34	
20	Alex Misael Suligoy	Argentina	100	99	98	99	99	98	593	34	
21	Artur Ayvazyan	Ukraine	100	100	98	99	98	98	593	29	
22	Valérian Sauveplane	France	98	99	100	99	97	99	592	39	
23	Christian Planer	Austria	99	99	99	99	97	99	592	39	
24	Torben Grimmel	Denmark	98	99	96	99	100	100	592	36	
25	Ryan Taylor	New Zealand	100	99	99	98	97	99	592	35	
26	Ole Magnus Bakken	Norway	99	99	98	98	99	99	592	34	
27	Thomas Farnik	Austria	98	100	98	99	98	99	592	29	
28	Wang Weiyi	China	96	100	97	99	100	99	591	39	
29	James Huckle	Great Britain	100	97	96	100	99	99	591	35	
30	Yury Shcherbatsevich	Belarus	96	100	99	98	100	98	591	32	
31	Pascal Loretan	Switzerland	98	99	100	98	98	98	591	28	
32	Warren Potent	Australia	98	98	99	98	98	100	591	25	
33	Midori Yajima	Japan	98	98	100	98	97	99	590	35	
34	Zhu Qinan	China	99	99	99	98	97	98	590	34	
35	Javier López	Spain	100	98	99	97	96	99	589	37	
36	Marco De Nicolo	Italy	96	97	99	99	99	99	589	36	
37	Maik Eckhardt	Germany	99	100	98	94	100	98	589	35	
38	Cory Niefer	Canada	98	97	99	97	100	98	589	32	
39	Jozef Gönci	Slovakia	98	98	97	100	98	98	589	31	
40	Nyantain Bayaraa	Mongolia	98	97	100	99	98	96	588	35	
41	Václav Haman	Czech Republic	98	98	97	99	98	98	588	32	
42	Anton Rizov	Bulgaria	99	97	99	96	100	97	588	30	
43	Peter Hellenbrand	Netherlands	98	100	98	97	100	95	588	28	
44	Sergey Richter	Israel	97	98	98	98	98	98	587	31	
45	Nedžad Fazlija	Bosnia and Herzegovina	98	98	97	97	98	98	587	26	
46	Cyril Graff	France	97	99	98	97	98	97	586	32	
47	Mangala Samarakoon	Sri Lanka	96	98	100	97	97	97	586	32	
48	Dane Sampson	Australia	96	97	99	96	97	98	583	29	
49	Serhiy Kulish	Ukraine	97	98	95	95	99	99	583	24	
50	Juan Diego Angeloni	Argentina	95	96	99	97	96	97	580	27	

== Final ==
Rank	Athlete	Qual	1	2	3	4	5	6	7	8	9	10	Final	Total	Notes
1st place, gold medalist(s)	Sergei Martynov (BLR)	600	10.8	10.5	10.5	10.6	10.2	10.7	10.4	10.3	10.9	10.6	105.5	705.5	WR
2nd place, silver medalist(s)	Lionel Cox (BEL)	599	10.1	10.1	10.0	10.5	10.3	10.1	10.6	9.7	10.4	10.4	102.2	701.2	
3rd place, bronze medalist(s)	Rajmond Debevec (SLO)	596	10.2	10.5	10.7	10.3	10.6	10.8	10.2	10.6	10.5	10.6	105.0	701.0	
4	Joydeep Karmakar (IND)	595	10.1	10.6	10.7	10.5	10.7	10.2	10.0	10.2	10.7	10.4	104.1	699.1	
5	Daniel Brodmeier (GER)	595	10.4	10.4	10.5	10.7	10.1	9.7	10.5	10.9	9.6	10.4	103.2	698.2	
6	Han Jin-Seop (KOR)	595	10.3	9.8	10.2	10.8	10.1	10.6	10.1	10.0	10.7	10.6	103.2	698.2	
7	Bojan Durković (CRO)	595	10.0	10.2	10.7	10.4	10.0	10.0	10.1	10.6	10.5	10.5	103.0	698.0	
8	Niccolò Campriani (ITA)	595	10.2	10.4	10.3	10.4	10.5	9.9	10.1	10.1	10.3	10.4	102.6	697.6	
