= Shooting at the 2012 Summer Olympics =

Shooting at the Games of the XXX Olympiad
- Venue: Royal Artillery Barracks
- Dates: 28 July – 6 August 2012

Shooting competitions at the 2012 Summer Olympics in London took place from 28 July to 6 August at the Royal Artillery Barracks in Woolwich. Fifteen events were included with 390 athletes taking part. The events were the same as in 2008.

The competitions were originally planned for the National Shooting Centre in Bisley, Surrey, and the temporary solution at the Royal Artillery Barracks (which is in the River Zone) was adopted later after the International Olympic Committee expressed concerns about the distance between London and Bisley.

Since the pistols used in the 25m and 50m shooting events were deemed by HM Government as prohibited in England, Scotland and Wales after the Dunblane Massacre, special dispensation had to be granted by the UK Government and security criteria met by LOCOG to allow certain events to go ahead.

== Qualification ==
The qualification system was similar to that used for previous Games, with a fixed number of quota places divided among the nations whose shooters place well at the top-level global and continental championships. However, due to new IOC regulations mandating that all qualification events take place during the last 24 months before the Olympics, no such quota places were awarded during the 2009 ISSF World Cup or the 2010 ISSF World Cup, leading to decreased interest in these competitions to the point where the 2010 competition planned for New Delhi had to be rescheduled and moved to Australia. The International Shooting Sport Federation announced that qualification would commence with the 2010 ISSF World Shooting Championships in Munich, which ended on 10 August, almost exactly two years before the Olympics.

Great Britain did not qualify spots through the World Championship, rather its places were guaranteed due to it being the host nation, however it could qualify shooters to the other events. Iran was the only country that did not send shooters to the 2008 Summer Olympics to have qualified a shooter for the 2012 Summer Olympics.

== Schedule ==
Legend
Q	Qualification	F	Final

Event↓/Date →	Sat 28		Sun 29		Mon 30		Tue 31	Wed 1		Thu 2		Fri 3		Sat 4		Sun 5		Mon 6	
Rifle
Men's 10 m air rifle					Q	F													
Men's 50 m rifle prone												Q	F						
Men's 50 m rifle 3 positions																		Q	F
Women's 10 m air rifle	Q	F																	
Women's 50 m rifle 3 positions														Q	F				
Pistol
Men's 10 m air pistol	Q	F																	
Men's 25 m rapid fire pistol										Q			F						
Men's 50 m pistol																Q	F		
Women's 10 m air pistol			Q	F															
Women's 25 m pistol								Q	F										
Shotgun
Men's trap																Q			F
Men's double trap										Q	F								
Men's skeet					Q		F												
Women's trap														Q	F				
Women's skeet			Q	F															

== Medal summary ==
=== Medal table ===
* Host nation (Great Britain)

Rank	Nation	Gold	Silver	Bronze	Total
1	South Korea	3	2	0	5
2	United States	3	0	1	4
3	Italy	2	3	0	5
4	China	2	2	3	7
5	Belarus	1	0	0	1
5	Croatia	1	0	0	1
5	Cuba	1	0	0	1
5	Great Britain*	1	0	0	1
5	Romania	1	0	0	1
10	France	0	1	1	2
10	India	0	1	1	2
10	Serbia	0	1	1	2
10	Slovakia	0	1	1	2
14	Belgium	0	1	0	1
14	Denmark	0	1	0	1
14	Poland	0	1	0	1
14	Sweden	0	1	0	1
18	Ukraine	0	0	2	2
19	Czech Republic	0	0	1	1
19	Kuwait	0	0	1	1
19	Qatar	0	0	1	1
19	Russia	0	0	1	1
19	Slovenia	0	0	1	1
Totals (23 entries)		15	15	15	45

=== Men's events ===
Event	Gold	Silver	Bronze
10 m air rifle	Alin Moldoveanu; Romania	Niccolò Campriani; Italy	Gagan Narang; India
50 m rifle prone	Sergei Martynov; Belarus WR	Lionel Cox; Belgium	Rajmond Debevec; Slovenia
50 m rifle three positions	Niccolò Campriani; Italy OR	Kim Jong-hyun; South Korea	Matthew Emmons; United States
10 m air pistol	Jin Jong-oh; South Korea	Luca Tesconi; Italy	Andrija Zlatić; Serbia
25 m rapid fire pistol	Leuris Pupo; Cuba	Vijay Kumar; India	Ding Feng; China
50 m pistol	Jin Jong-oh; South Korea	Choi Young-rae; South Korea	Wang Zhiwei; China
Skeet	Vincent Hancock; United States	Anders Golding; Denmark	Nasser Al-Attiyah; Qatar
Trap	Giovanni Cernogoraz; Croatia	Massimo Fabbrizi; Italy	Fehaid Al-Deehani; Kuwait
Double trap	Peter Wilson; Great Britain	Håkan Dahlby; Sweden	Vasily Mosin; Russia

=== Women's events ===
Event	Gold	Silver	Bronze
10 m air rifle	Yi Siling; China	Sylwia Bogacka; Poland	Yu Dan; China
50 m rifle three positions	Jamie Lynn Gray; United States OR	Ivana Maksimović; Serbia	Adéla Sýkorová; Czech Republic
10 m air pistol	Guo Wenjun; China	Céline Goberville; France	Olena Kostevych; Ukraine
25 m pistol	Kim Jang-mi; South Korea	Chen Ying; China	Olena Kostevych; Ukraine
Skeet	Kim Rhode; United States WR	Wei Ning; China	Danka Barteková; Slovakia
Trap	Jessica Rossi; Italy WR	Zuzana Štefečeková; Slovakia	Delphine Réau; France
