= List of Summer Olympics venues: W–Z =

For the Summer Olympics, there are 25 venues starting with the letter 'W', no venues starting with the letter 'X', three venues starting with the letter 'Y', and four venues starting with the letter 'Z'.

== W ==
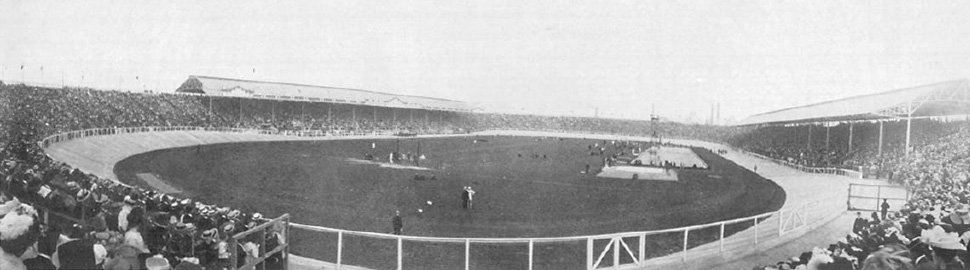
The White City Stadium during the 1908 Summer Olympics. This venue hosted 13 different sports for those games.

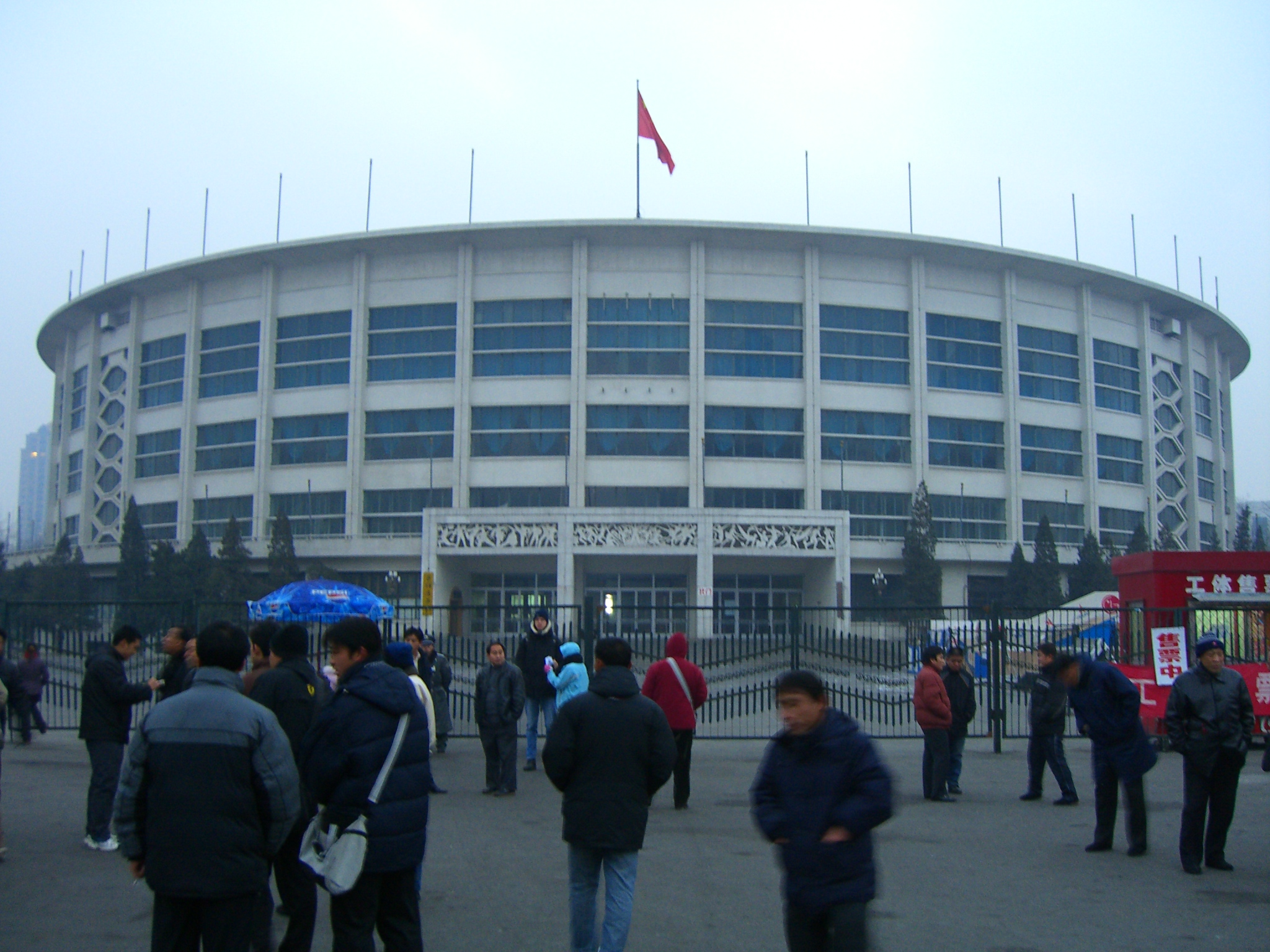
Workers Indoor Arena hosted boxing competitions for the 2008 Summer Olympics in Beijing.

Venue	Games	Sports	Capacity	Ref.
Walking course	1992 Barcelona	Athletics (walks)	Not listed.	
Walking course	1996 Atlanta	Athletics (walks)	800	
Wannsee Golf Course	1936 Berlin	Modern pentathlon (running)	Not listed.	
Wannsee Shooting Range	1936 Berlin	Shooting	Not listed.	
Waseda Memorial Hall	1964 Tokyo	Fencing, Modern pentathlon (fencing)	2,200	
Wassaw Sound	1996 Atlanta	Sailing	1,000	
Water Polo Arena	2012 London	Water polo	5,000	
Weingart Stadium	1984 Los Angeles	Field hockey	22,000	
Wembley Arena	2012 London	Badminton, Gymnastics (rhythmic)	6,000	
Wembley Palace of Engineering	1948 London	Fencing	Not listed.	
Wembley Stadium	2012 London	Football (final)	90,000	
West Melbourne Stadium	1956 Melbourne	Basketball, Boxing, Gymnastics	7,000	
Westchester	1932 Los Angeles	Equestrian (cross-country riding)	Not listed.	
Westend Tennis Hall	1952 Helsinki	Fencing	Not listed.	
Weymouth and Portland National Sailing Academy	2012 London	Sailing	None.	
White City Stadium	1908 London	Archery, Athletics, Cycling (track), Diving, Field hockey, Football, Gymnastics, Lacrosse, Rugby union, Swimming, Tug of war, Water polo (final), Wrestling	97,000.	
White Hart Lane	1948 London	Football	36,310	
Williamstown	1956 Melbourne	Modern pentathlon (shooting), Shooting (pistol, rifle)	Not listed.	
Windsor Great Park	1948 London	Cycling (road)	Not listed.	
Winter Stadium, Université de Montréal	1976 Montreal	Fencing, Modern pentathlon (fencing)	2,461	
Wolf Creek Shooting Complex	1996 Atlanta	Shooting	7,500	
Workers Indoor Arena	2008 Beijing	Boxing	13,000	
Workers Stadium	2008 Beijing	Football	70,161	
Wukesong Baseball Field	2008 Beijing	Baseball	18,000	
Wukesong Indoor Stadium	2008 Beijing	Basketball	18,000	

== X ==
There are no Summer Olympic venues that started with the letter 'X'. This includes the 2012 Summer Olympics in London and the 2016 Summer Olympics in Rio de Janeiro.

== Y ==
Venue	Games	Sports	Capacity	Ref.
Ying Tung Natatorium	2008 Beijing	Water Polo, Modern pentathlon (swimming)	4,852	
Yokohama Cultural Gymnasium	1964 Tokyo	Volleyball (final)	3,800	
Young Pioneers Stadium	1980 Moscow	Field hockey (final)	5,000	

== Z ==
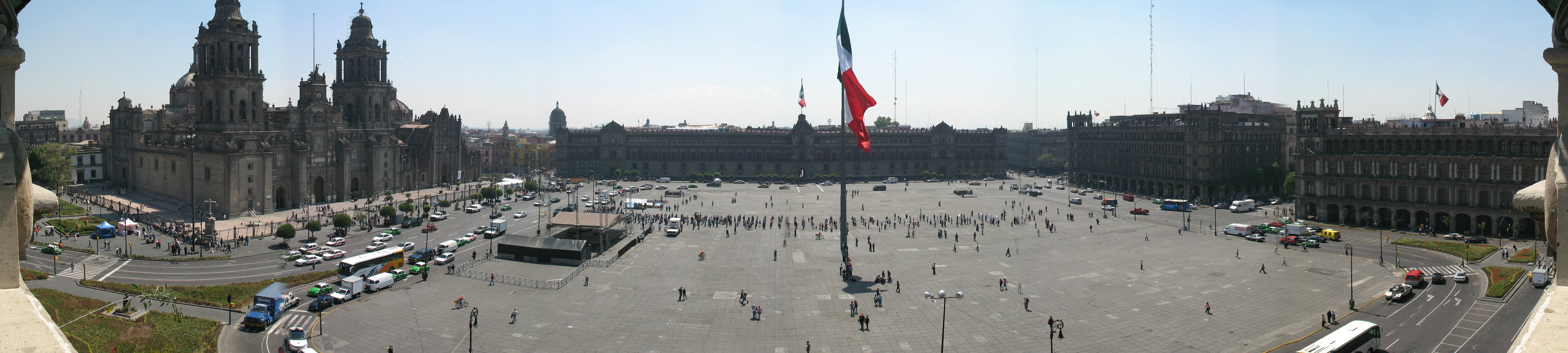
Panoramic view of the Zócalo (Plaza de la Constitución), Mexico City. Looking east from the roof top restaurant on the Portal de Mercaderes to the Palacio Nacional in 2007. Zócalo was the starting point of the marathon event for the 1968 Summer Olympics.

Venue	Games	Sports	Capacity	Ref.
Zappeion	1896 Athens	Fencing	Not listed.	
Zeeburg Shooting Grounds	1928 Amsterdam	Modern pentathlon (shooting)	10,455	
Zócalo	1968 Mexico City	Athletics (marathon start)	Not listed	
Zuiderzee	1928 Amsterdam	Sailing	2,263	
