= Wolfram Waibel Sr. =

Austrian sports shooter (1947–2023)

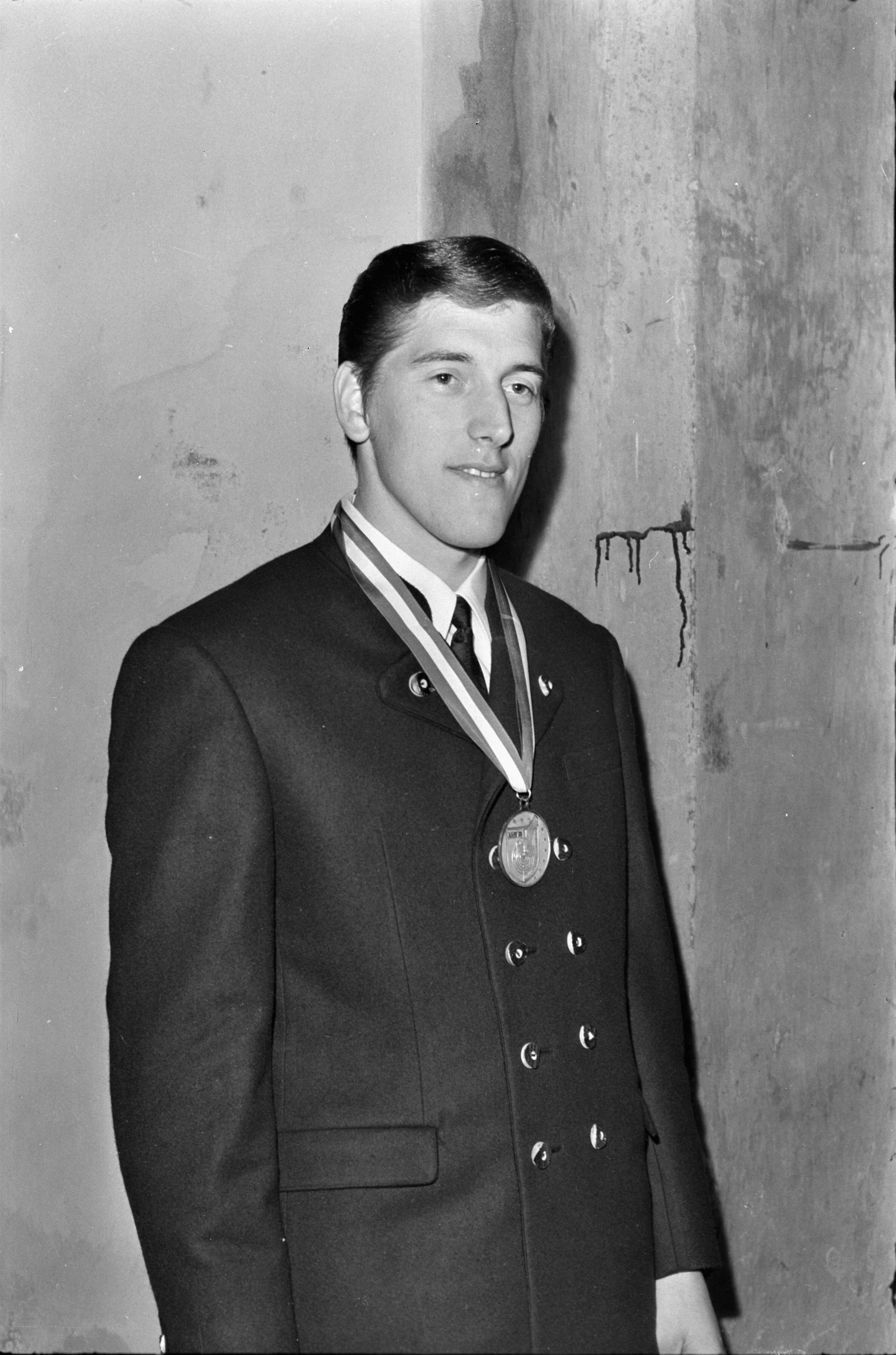
- Waibel in Hohenems, 1970

Personal information
- Born: 1 July 1947 Hohenems, Vorarlberg, Austria
- Died: 13 December 2023 (aged 76)
- Occupation: sports shooter
- Height: 5 ft 10 in (178 cm)

Sport
- Retired: 1992

Achievements and titles
- Olympic finals: 1968 Summer, 1972 Summer, 1976 Summer, 1980 Summer, 1992 Summer
- Updated on 15 February 2014

Wolfram Waibel (1 July 1947 – 13 December 2023) was an Austrian Olympic sports shooter competitor. He competed in five Olympic Games. Waibel never won an Olympic medal, but he won a silver medal at the 1970 World Championships and a bronze medal at the 1974 World Championships. He also won four medals at the European Shooting Championships.

His son, Wolfram Waibel Jr. won two medals shooting rifle at the 1996 Olympic Games in Atlanta.

Waibel died on 13 December 2023, at the age of 76.

== See also ==
- List of athletes with the most appearances at Olympic Games
