= Cassio Rippel =

Brazilian sport shooter (born 1978)

Personal information
- Full name: Cassio Cesar de Mello Rippel
- Nationality: Brazil
- Born: 2 May 1978 (age 48) Ponta Grossa, Paraná, Brazil
- Height: 193 cm (6 ft 4 in)
- Weight: 90 kg (198 lb)

Sport
- Sport: Shooting
- Event(s): 50 m rifle prone (FR60PR); 50 m rifle 3 positions (FR3X40)
- Club: Associacao Campineira de Tiro Esportivo
- Coached by: Oleg Mykhaylov (UKR)
Medal record
Men's shooting
Representing Brazil
Pan American Games
Gold medal – first place	2015 Toronto	FR60PR

Cassio Cesar de Mello Rippel (born May 2, 1978 in Ponta Grossa, Paraná) is a Brazilian sport shooter. He has been a finalist in five out of eleven World Cup meets throughout his shooting career, and later became the Pan American Games rifle prone champion in 2015, securing him a quota place on the host nation's team for Rio 2016. Apart from his marksmanship success, Rippel serves as a military officer of the Brazilian Army and trains for the Brazilian national team under head coach Oleg Mykhaylov, a two-time Olympic rifle shooter representing Ukraine (1996 and 2000).

Rippel began to shoot rifle at the age of seventeen upon his admission to Agulhas Negras Military Academy in Resende, Rio de Janeiro. After graduating from the Academy in 1999, Rippel was invited to join the Brazilian Army, where he had undergone basic and infantry training for full-bore military rifle. In 2003, he started to compete for the Brazilian national team in Olympic small-bore rifle shooting, but put his sporting duties on a six-year adjournment instead to focus on his post-graduate studies and complete the master's degree in military science at the Academy.

Rippel made his international debut at the 2012 ISSF World Cup meet in Milan, Italy, finishing thirty-fourth in the 50 m rifle prone with a prelims score of 591. When ISSF had changed its rules to the competition format at the start of the 2013 season, Rippel managed to improve his lifetime best scores of 625.3 and 626.0 in the 50 m rifle prone at the ISSF World Cup series, briefly landing him into the top five position twice in the final round with a 143.4 and a remarkable 144.9. Because of his early successes to the sport, Rippel was elected the Best Shooter of the Year by the Brazilian Olympic Committee.

At the 2015 Pan American Games in Toronto, Rippel fired a fantastic 207.7 to set the final meet record and claim the first gold medal ever of his shooting career in the 50 m rifle prone, prevailing over the U.S. shooter and defending Pan American Games champion Michael McPhail by a 2.2-point advantage. Rippel's victory also gave the Brazilians a berth for the host nation at the upcoming 2016 Summer Olympics in Rio de Janeiro.
