= Uptagrafft =

Uptagrafft is a surname. Notable people with the surname include:

- Eric Uptagrafft (born 1966), American sport shooter
- Sandra Uptagrafft (born 1971), American female sport shooter
