= Shooting at the 2010 South American Games – Men's 50m rifle prone =

The Men's 10m air rifle event at the 2010 South American Games was held on March 23, with the qualification at 8:00 and the Finals at 11:00.

== Individual ==
=== Medalists ===
Gold	Silver	Bronze
Elias Roberto Onatt; Chile	Raul Vargas; Venezuela	Pablo Alvarez; Argentina

=== Results ===
==== Qualification ====
Rank	Athlete	Series						Total
Rank	Athlete	1	2	3	4	5	6	Total
1	Julio Cesar Iemma (VEN)	98	99	99	98	96	98	588
2	Elias Roberto Onatt (CHI)	95	99	98	99	99	97	587
3	Raul Vargas (VEN)	95	96	100	99	100	96	586
3	Samuel Lopes (BRA)	98	99	96	97	99	97	586
5	Pablo Alvarez (ARG)	98	97	95	98	98	99	585
6	Cesar Augusto Rodriguez (COL)	98	96	96	98	98	96	582
7	Gonzalo Andres Zilleruelo (CHI)	97	94	96	97	98	98	580
8	Cristian Fernando Andrade (ECU)	96	94	96	98	97	97	578
9	Jaime Asdrubal Espin (ECU)	98	98	96	98	94	94	578
10	Cesar Renato Laos (PER)	95	99	95	97	98	94	578
11	Alex Misael Suligoy (ARG)	95	95	96	99	96	96	577
12	Alvaro Duban Echeverri (COL)	94	97	97	96	95	96	575
13	Mauro Salles (BRA)	96	96	95	97	86	97	567
14	Alexander Eloy Laurente (PER)	95	92	95	96	94	94	566
	Mauricio Andres Garcia (CHI)							DNS

==== Final ====
Rank	Athlete	Qual Score	Final Score	Total	Shoot-off
1st place, gold medalist(s)	Elias Roberto Onatt (CHI)	587	102.7	689.7	
2nd place, silver medalist(s)	Raul Vargas (VEN)	586	100.2	686.2	
3rd place, bronze medalist(s)	Pablo Alvarez (ARG)	585	101.1	686.1	10.5
4	Julio Cesar Iemma (VEN)	588	98.1	686.1	9.5
5	Samuel Lopes (BRA)	586	98.4	684.4	
6	Cesar Augusto Rodriguez (COL)	582	100.5	682.5	
7	Gonzalo Andres Zilleruelo (CHI)	580	97.2	677.2	
8	Cristian Fernando Andrade (ECU)	578	98.6	676.6	

== Team ==
=== Medalists ===
Gold	Silver	Bronze
Julio Cesar Iemma; Raul Vargas; Venezuela	Elias Roberto Onatt; Gonzalo Andres Zilleruelo; Chile	Pablo Alvarez; Alex Misael Suligoy; Argentina

=== Results ===
Rank	Athlete	Series						Total
Rank	Athlete	1	2	3	4	5	6	Total
1st place, gold medalist(s)	Venezuela							1174
1st place, gold medalist(s)	Julio Cesar Iemma (VEN)	98	99	99	98	96	98	588
1st place, gold medalist(s)	Raul Vargas (VEN)	95	96	100	99	100	96	586
2nd place, silver medalist(s)	Chile							1167
2nd place, silver medalist(s)	Elias Roberto Onatt (CHI)	95	99	98	99	99	97	587
2nd place, silver medalist(s)	Gonzalo Andres Zilleruelo (CHI)	97	94	96	97	98	98	580
3rd place, bronze medalist(s)	Argentina							1162
3rd place, bronze medalist(s)	Pablo Alvarez (ARG)	98	97	95	98	98	99	585
3rd place, bronze medalist(s)	Alex Misael Suligoy (ARG)	95	95	96	99	96	96	577
4	Colombia							1157
4	Cesar Augusto Rodriguez (COL)	98	96	96	98	98	96	582
4	Alvaro Duban Echeverri (COL)	94	97	97	96	95	96	575
5	Ecuador							1156
5	Cristian Fernando Andrade (ECU)	96	94	96	98	97	97	578
5	Jaime Asdrubal Espin (ECU)	98	98	96	98	94	94	578
6	Brazil							1153
6	Samuel Lopes (BRA)	98	99	96	97	99	97	586
6	Mauro Salles (BRA)	96	96	95	97	86	97	567
7	Peru							1144
7	Cesar Renato Laos (PER)	95	99	95	97	98	94	578
7	Alexander Eloy Laurente (PER)	95	92	95	96	94	94	566
