= Naoki Kurita =

Japanese sports shooter

Naoki Kurita (born October 15, 1971) is a Japanese sport shooter. He competed in rifle shooting events at the Summer Olympics in 1996 and 2000.

== Olympic results ==
Event	1996	2000
50 metre rifle three positions (men)	T-37th	40th
50 metre rifle prone (men)	T-30th	T-35th
10 metre air rifle (men)	T-38th	—
