= Roger Caron (sport shooter) =

Canadian sport shooter

Roger Caron (born December 18, 1957, in Matane) is a Canadian sport shooter. He tied for 38th place in the men's 50 metre rifle prone event at the 2000 Summer Olympics.
