= Shooting at the 1996 Summer Olympics =

Shooting at the Games of the XXVI Olympiad
- Pictogram for Shooting

The shooting competitions at the 1996 Summer Olympics took place at the Wolf Creek Shooting Complex near Atlanta, United States. Competitions were held in men's events and women's events. For men's and women's double trap, it was the first Olympic competition, and a women's shotgun event also had been added.

In addition, the number of targets in trap and skeet had been reduced from 200 to 125, and the final rules for all events were changed so that any post-final ties would be broken by shoot-offs, as opposed to the previous rule that preferred the shooter with worse qualification score and better final score.

== Medal summary ==
=== Medal table ===
| Rank | Nation | Gold | Silver | Bronze | Total |
|---|---|---|---|---|---|
| 1 | Russia | 3 | 2 | 1 | 6 |
| 2 | China | 2 | 2 | 1 | 5 |
| 3 | Germany | 2 | 2 | 0 | 4 |
| 4 | Italy | 2 | 1 | 2 | 5 |
| 5 | Australia | 2 | 0 | 1 | 3 |
| 6 | Poland | 1 | 1 | 1 | 3 |
| 6 | United States | 1 | 1 | 1 | 3 |
| 8 | FR Yugoslavia | 1 | 0 | 1 | 2 |
| 8 | France | 1 | 0 | 1 | 2 |
| 10 | Bulgaria | 0 | 2 | 2 | 4 |
| 11 | Kazakhstan | 0 | 2 | 1 | 3 |
| 12 | Austria | 0 | 1 | 1 | 2 |
| 13 | Belarus | 0 | 1 | 0 | 1 |
| 14 | Czech Republic | 0 | 0 | 1 | 1 |
| 14 | Slovakia | 0 | 0 | 1 | 1 |
| Totals (15 entries) | | 15 | 15 | 15 | 45 |

== Men's events ==
| Games | Gold | Silver | Bronze |
|---|---|---|---|
| 50 metre rifle three positions | Jean-Pierre Amat; France | Sergey Belyayev; Kazakhstan | Wolfram Waibel; Austria |
| 50 metre rifle prone | Christian Klees; Germany | Sergey Belyayev; Kazakhstan | Jozef Gönci; Slovakia |
| 10 metre air rifle | Artem Khadjibekov; Russia | Wolfram Waibel; Austria | Jean-Pierre Amat; France |
| 50 metre pistol | Boris Kokorev; Russia | Igor Basinski; Belarus | Roberto Di Donna; Italy |
| 25 metre rapid fire pistol | Ralf Schumann; Germany | Emil Milev; Bulgaria | Vladimir Vokhmyanin; Kazakhstan |
| 10 metre air pistol | Roberto Di Donna; Italy | Wang Yifu; China | Tanyu Kiryakov; Bulgaria |
| Trap | Michael Diamond; Australia | Josh Lakatos; United States | Lance Bade; United States |
| Double trap | Russell Mark; Australia | Albano Pera; Italy | Zhang Bing; China |
| Skeet | Ennio Falco; Italy | Mirosław Rzepkowski; Poland | Andrea Benelli; Italy |
| 10 metre running target | Yang Ling; China | Xiao Jun; China | Miroslav Januš; Czech Republic |

== Women's events ==
| Games | Gold | Silver | Bronze |
|---|---|---|---|
| 50 metre rifle three positions | Aleksandra Ivošev; FR Yugoslavia | Irina Gerasimenok; Russia | Renata Mauer; Poland |
| 10 metre air rifle | Renata Mauer; Poland | Petra Horneber; Germany | Aleksandra Ivošev; FR Yugoslavia |
| 25 metre pistol | Li Duihong; China | Diana Iorgova; Bulgaria | Marina Logvinenko; Russia |
| 10 metre air pistol | Olga Klochneva; Russia | Marina Logvinenko; Russia | Mariya Grozdeva; Bulgaria |
| Double trap | Kim Rhode; United States | Susanne Kiermayer; Germany | Deserie Huddleston; Australia |

== Participating nations ==
A total of 419 shooters, 294 men and 125 women, from 100 nations competed at the Atlanta Games:

- Albania (2)
- Andorra (1)
- Angola (1)
- Argentina (6)
- Armenia (1)
- Australia (16)
- Austria (3)
- Azerbaijan (2)
- Bangladesh (1)
- Barbados (1)
- Belarus (10)
- Belgium (4)
- Bosnia and Herzegovina (1)
- Brazil (1)
- Brunei (1)
- Bulgaria (9)
- Canada (9)
- Chile (1)
- China (24)
- Chinese Taipei (2)

- Colombia (2)
- Croatia (4)
- Cuba (3)
- Cyprus (3)
- Czech Republic (17)
- Denmark (8)
- Ecuador (1)
- Egypt (2)
- Estonia (2)
- Finland (6)
- France (13)
- Georgia (3)
- Germany (22)
- Great Britain (5)
- Greece (3)
- Guatemala (4)
- Hong Kong (1)
- Hungary (10)
- India (2)
- Iran (1)

- Iraq (1)
- Ireland (3)
- Israel (3)
- Italy (15)
- Japan (9)
- Jordan (1)
- Kazakhstan (5)
- Kenya (1)
- Kuwait (2)
- Kyrgyzstan (2)
- Latvia (2)
- Lithuania (1)
- Luxembourg (2)
- Macedonia (1)
- Malaysia (1)
- Malta (1)
- Mexico (1)
- Moldova (2)
- Monaco (1)
- Mongolia (2)

- Myanmar (1)
- Namibia (1)
- Nepal (1)
- Netherlands (2)
- Netherlands Antilles (1)
- New Zealand (2)
- Nicaragua (1)
- North Korea (1)
- Norway (7)
- Oman (1)
- Panama (1)
- Peru (3)
- Philippines (1)
- Poland (10)
- Portugal (4)
- Puerto Rico (2)
- Qatar (1)
- Romania (4)
- Russia (19)
- San Marino (2)

- Saudi Arabia (1)
- FR Yugoslavia (7)
- Singapore (1)
- Slovakia (3)
- Slovenia (1)
- South Africa (2)
- South Korea (14)
- Spain (6)
- Sri Lanka (2)
- Sweden (3)
- Switzerland (7)
- Thailand (3)
- Turkey (1)
- Turkmenistan (1)
- Ukraine (9)
- United Arab Emirates (1)
- United States (25)
- Virgin Islands (1)
- Uzbekistan (1)
- Vietnam (1)
