= Shooting at the 2015 Pan American Games – Men's 50 metre rifle prone =

Shooting – Men's 50 metre rifle prone at the 2015 Pan American Games
- Venue: Pan Am Shooting Centre
- Dates: July 17
- Competitors: 29 from 19 nations
- Gold medal match score: 207.7

Medalists
Gold medal	Cassio Rippel	Brazil
Silver medal	Michael McPhail	United States
Bronze medal	Michel Dion	Canada

The Men's 50 metre rifle prone shooting event at the 2015 Pan American Games will be held on July 17 at the Pan Am Shooting Centre in Innisfil.

The event consisted of two rounds: a qualifier and a final. In the qualifier, each shooter fired 60 shots with a .22 Long Rifle at 50 metres distance from the prone position. Scores for each shot were in increments of 1, with a maximum score of 10.

The top 8 shooters in the qualifying round moved on to the final round. There, they fired an additional 10 shots. These shots scored in increments of .1, with a maximum score of 10.9. The total score from all 70 shots was used to determine final ranking.

The winners of all fifteen events, along with the runner up in the men's air rifle, skeet, trap and both women's rifle events will qualify for the 2016 Summer Olympics in Rio de Janeiro, Brazil (granted the athlete has not yet earned a quota for their country).

== Schedule ==
All times are Central Standard Time (UTC-6).

Date	Time	Round
July 17, 2015	11:45	Qualification
July 17, 2015	14:45	Final

== Results ==
=== Qualification round ===
Rank	Athlete	Country	1	2	3	4	5	6	Total	Notes
1	Cassio Rippel	Brazil	103.6	104.6	106.0	104.5	104.2	103.0	625.9	Q, PR
2	Michael McPhail	United States	105.3	102.9	102.2	104.9	104.4	105.3	625.0	Q
3	Bruno Heck	Brazil	102.5	103.2	105.1	105.2	102.5	105.3	623.8	Q
4	Michel Dion	Canada	103.2	103.8	103.7	103.4	103.8	102.6	620.5	Q
5	Gale Stewart	Canada	103.3	104.2	102.4	104.4	103.3	102.8	620.4	Q
6	Ángel Velarte	Argentina	103.6	103.5	103.4	101.4	103.6	103.8	619.3	Q
7	Raul Vargas	Venezuela	102.0	103.1	105.1	103.2	103.0	102.6	619.0	Q
8	José Luis Sánchez	Mexico	101.9	102.9	103.8	105.3	102.1	102.6	618.6	Q
9	George Norton	United States	103.4	103.5	102.2	104.1	102.8	101.3	617.3	
10	Juan Angeloni	Argentina	103.5	102.8	102.6	104.6	103.2	100.0	616.7	
11	Luis Morales	Mexico	102.3	104.7	103.1	102.5	102.9	100.9	616.4	
12	Reinier Estpinan	Cuba	102.5	102.8	103.6	101.3	102.8	101.2	614.2	
13	Elias San Martin	Chile	101.9	103.3	102.2	101.4	103.8	101.2	613.8	
14	Octavio Sandoval	Guatemala	102.4	103.1	102.9	103.4	99.8	101.1	612.7	
15	Hosman Duran	Dominican Republic	101.2	105.0	101.5	103.0	100.1	101.8	612.6	
16	Marlon Perez Rodriguez	Guatemala	101.2	102.8	102.9	99.0	104.4	101.9	612.2	
17	Roberto Chamberlain	Costa Rica	101.4	103.0	102.6	103.7	100.0	100.8	611.5	
18	Marlon Moses	Trinidad and Tobago	99.4	102.8	103.9	100.7	99.5	103.2	609.5	
19	Cristian Morales	Bolivia	99.8	101.5	102.2	99.4	103.4	102.9	609.2	
20	Cristian Santacruz	Ecuador	101.9	99.3	101.4	102.7	102.3	101.3	608.9	
21	Daniel Vizcarra	Peru	100.9	103.5	100.3	102.4	101.3	100.4	608.8	
22	Ned Gerard	Virgin Islands	101.7	101.5	99.7	99.6	104.9	101.2	608.6	
23	Yoleisy Lois	Cuba	98.6	100.2	100.4	103.6	102.6	101.3	606.7	
24	Israel Gutierrez	El Salvador	100.9	100.3	101.6	100.3	101.9	101.4	606.4	
25	Jesús Calderón	Chile	99.0	99.1	103.0	100.9	103.6	100.1	605.7	
26	Julio Iemma	Venezuela	100.3	102.5	101.1	100.5	101.7	98.8	604.9	
27	Oliser Zelaya	El Salvador	100.8	99.4	100.7	99.4	100.2	99.4	599.9	
28	Dwayne Ford	Jamaica	93.9	96.3	92.8	98.6	97.7	98.5	577.8	
29	Yerald Canda	Nicaragua	92.8	95.4	94.3	95.3	88.3	98.0	564.1	

=== Final ===
Rank	Athlete	Country	1	2	3	4	5	6	7	8	9	Total	Notes
1st place, gold medalist(s)	Cassio Rippel	Brazil	31.5; 10.2; 10.8; 10.5	62.5; 10.1; 10.7; 10.2	83.3; 10.8; 10.0	104.4; 10.7; 10.4	125.4; 10.5; 10.5	146.7; 10.8; 10.5	167.4; 10.1; 10.6	187.6; 10.1; 10.1	207.7; 10.0; 10.1	207.7	FPR
2nd place, silver medalist(s)	Michael McPhail	United States	31.2; 9.8; 10.9; 10.5	61.4; 10.0; 9.9; 10.3	82.3; 10.4; 10.5	103.4; 10.4; 10.7	123.8; 10.0; 10.4	144.8; 10.4; 10.6	165.2; 9.6; 10.8	185.0; 10.4; 9.4	205.5; 10.1; 10.4	205.5	
3rd place, bronze medalist(s)	Michel Dion	Canada	31.1; 10.2; 10.4; 10.5	61.7; 9.7; 10.3; 10.6	82.5; 10.3; 10.5	103.2; 10.7; 10.0	122.9; 9.9; 9.8	143.6; 10.0; 10.7	164.0; 10.2; 10.2	183.8; 9.9; 9.9	183.8	183.8	
4	Ángel Velarte	Argentina	30.7; 10.8; 10.2; 9.7	60.4; 9.8; 9.7; 10.2	81.4; 10.4; 10.6	102.7; 10.9; 10.4	122.7; 10.0; 10.0	142.7; 9.8; 10.2	162.9; 9.7; 10.5	162.9	162.9	162.9	
5	Bruno Heck	Brazil	30.0; 9.7; 10.3; 10.0	60.4; 10.3; 10.4; 9.7	80.4; 9.6; 10.4	100.9; 10.0; 10.5	121.3; 10.5; 9.9	141.4; 10.1; 10.0	141.4	141.4	141.4	141.4	S-Off 10.6
6	Gale Stewart	Canada	30.2; 10.0; 10.6; 9.6	60.3; 10.5; 10.3; 9.3	80.5; 9.8; 10.4	101.0; 10.2; 10.3	121.3; 10.4; 9.9	121.3	121.3	121.3	121.3	121.3	S-Off 10.2
7	Raul Vargas	Venezuela	30.7; 10.2; 10.5; 10.0	60.3; 9.9; 9.5; 10.2	79.9; 10.4; 9.2	99.6; 9.7; 10.0	99.6	99.6	99.6	99.6	99.6	99.6	
8	José Luis Sánchez	Mexico	27.7; 9.3; 9.3; 9.1	58.7; 10.7; 10.2; 10.1	78.4; 10.0; 9.7	78.4	78.4	78.4	78.4	78.4	78.4	78.4	
