= Yuri Fedkin =

Soviet sports shooter

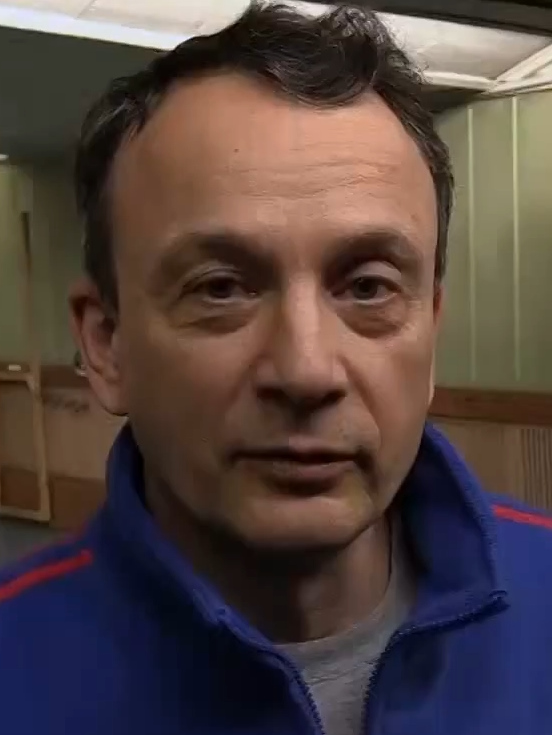
- Fedkin in 2014

Personal information
- Native name: Юрий Николаевич Федькин
- Full name: Yury Nikolayevich Fedkin
- Born: 6 October 1960 (age 65) Moscow, Soviet Union
Medal record
Men's shooting
Representing Unified Team
Olympic Games
Gold medal – first place	1992 Barcelona	10 m air rifle

Yury Nikolayevich Fedkin (Russian: Юрий Николаевич Федькин; born 6 October 1960) is a former Soviet sports shooter and Olympic champion. He won a gold medal in the 10 metre air rifle at the 1992 Summer Olympics in Barcelona.
