= Aleksandr Zlydenny =

Soviet sports shooter

Personal information
- Nationality: Soviet
- Born: 6 November 1968 (age 56)

Sport
- Sport: Sports shooting

Aleksandr Zlydenny (born 6 November 1968) is a Soviet sports shooter. He competed in the men's 10 metre air rifle event at the 1992 Summer Olympics.
