= Warren Potent =

Australian sports shooter

Warren James Potent
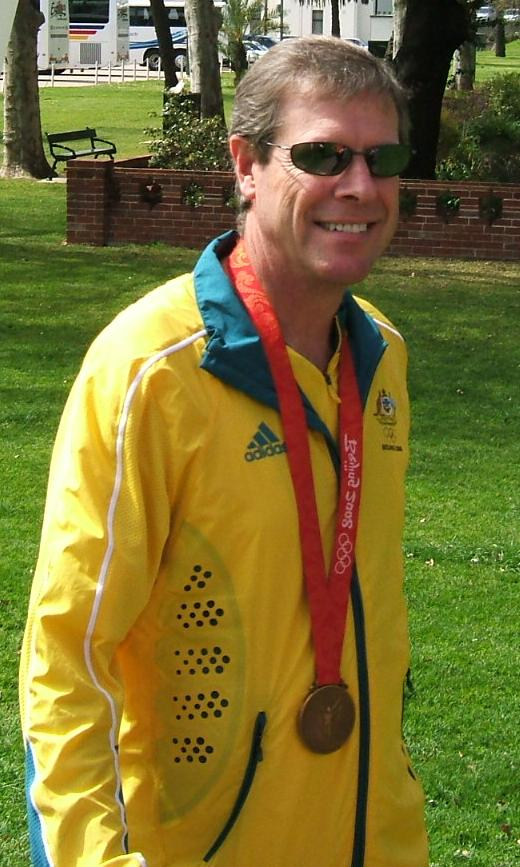
- 2008 Olympic bronze medalist Warren Potent

Personal information
- Nationality: Australian
- Born: 7 April 1962 (age 64) Parramatta, New South Wales

Sport
- Country: Australia
- Sport: Sport shooter
- Event: 50 metre rifle prone
Medal record
Men's shooting
Representing Australia
Olympic Games
Bronze medal – third place	2008 Beijing	50 m rifle prone
Commonwealth Games
Bronze medal – third place	1998 Kuala Lumpur	50 m rifle prone - Pairs
Gold medal – first place	2014 Glasgow	50 m rifle prone
Silver medal – second place	2010 Delhi	50 m rifle prone
Bronze medal – third place	2010 Delhi	50 m rifle prone pairs
ISSF World Shooting Championships
Gold medal – first place	1986 Suhl	50 metre rifle prone team
Gold medal – first place	2014 Grenada	50 metre rifle prone
- Updated on 12 September 2014

Warren James Potent (born 7 April 1962) is an Australian sport shooter. He won the bronze medal in the 50 metre rifle prone at the 2008 Summer Olympics. He won two of the four competitions during the 2007 World Cup season. In the 2008 ISSF World Cup, he won two bronzes as well as the gold in the pre-Olympic event in Beijing, where he equalled Christian Klees's then world record for the final aggregate score. At the 2014 ISSF World Championships in Grenada he became the 50 metre rifle prone World Champion.

== Olympic results ==
Event	2000	2004	2008	2012	2016
50 metre rifle prone	19th 593	42nd 586	(bronze) Bronze; 595+105.5	32nd 591	35th 620
