= Stoyan Stamenov =

Bulgarian sports shooter

Personal information
- Nationality: Bulgarian
- Born: 17 April 1970 (age 54); Sofia, Bulgaria

Sport
- Sport: Sports shooting

Stoyan Stamenov (Bulgarian: Стоян Стаменов; born 17 April 1970) is a Bulgarian sports shooter. He competed in the men's 10 metre air rifle event at the 1992 Summer Olympics.
