= Anuj Desai =

Kenyan sports shooter

Personal information
- Nationality: Kenyan
- Born: 4 February 1951 (age 74)

Sport
- Sport: Sports shooting

Anuj Desai (born 4 February 1951) is a Kenyan sports shooter. He competed in the men's 50 metre rifle prone event at the 1996 Summer Olympics.
