= Oleg Mykhaylov =

Ukrainian sports shooter

Oleg Mykhaylov (born 1 May 1968) is a Ukrainian sport shooter. He competed in rifle shooting events at the Summer Olympics in 1996 and 2000.

== Olympic results ==
Event	1996	2000
50 metre rifle three positions (men)	26th	T-22nd
50 metre rifle prone (men)	T-11th	T-30th
10 metre air rifle (men)	32nd	T-18th
