= Yuri Lomov =

Kyrgyzstani sport shooter (born 1964)

Yuri Lomov (Russian: Юрий Ломов; born April 19, 1964, in Frunze) is a Kyrgyzstani sport shooter. He competed in rifle shooting events at the Summer Olympics in 1996 and 2000.

== Olympic results ==
Event	1996	2000
50 metre rifle three positions (men)	T-32nd	35th
50 metre rifle prone (men)	T-11th	T-35th
10 metre air rifle (men)	T-22nd	T-15th
