= Jonathan Stern (sport shooter) =

British sports shooter

Personal information
- Nationality: British
- Born: 19 May 1965 (age 59); London, England

Sport
- Sport: Sports shooting

Jonathan Stern (born 19 May 1965) is a British sports shooter. He competed in the men's 50 metre rifle prone event at the 1996 Summer Olympics.
