= Bill Meek (sport shooter) =

American sports shooter

Bill Meek (born May 14, 1953, in Upland, California) is an American sport shooter. He competed in the Summer Olympics in 1992 and 1996. In 1992, he placed ninth in the men's 50 metre rifle prone event; in 1996, he placed eighth in the men's 50 metre rifle prone event.
