= Ji Jong-gu =

South Korean sports shooter

Personal information
- Nationality: South Korean
- Born: 2 December 1969 (age 55)

Sport
- Sport: Sports shooting

Ji Jong-gu (born 2 December 1969) is a South Korean sports shooter. He competed in the men's 10 metre air rifle event at the 1992 Summer Olympics.
