= Jaco Henn =

South African sport shooter (born 1974)

Jaco Henn (born 17 December 1974 in Johannesburg) is a South African sport shooter. He competed in rifle shooting events at the Summer Olympics in 1996 and 2000.

== Olympic results ==
Event	1996	2000
50 metre rifle three positions (men)	T-22nd	36th
50 metre rifle prone (men)	T-26th	T-44th
