= Kurt Koch (sport shooter) =

Swiss sports shooter

Personal information
- Nationality: Swiss
- Born: 9 September 1960 (age 64)

Sport
- Sport: Sports shooting

Kurt Koch (born 9 September 1960) is a Swiss sports shooter. He competed in the men's 50 metre rifle prone event at the 1996 Summer Olympics.
