= Rajmond Debevec =

Slovenian sport shooter (born 1963)

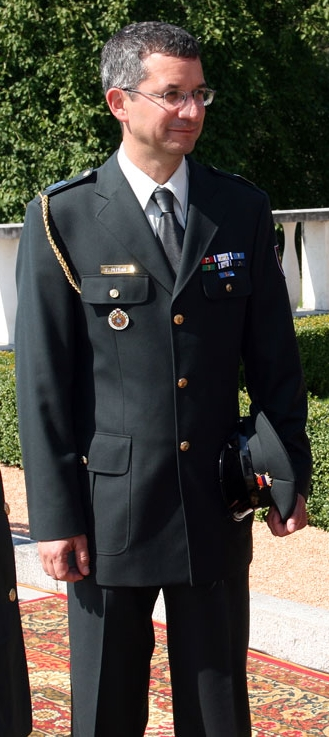
- Rajmond Debevec

Personal information
- Citizenship: Slovenian
- Born: 29 March 1963 (age 63) Postojna, SR Slovenia, SFR Yugoslavia
- Height: 1.83 m (6 ft 0 in)
- Weight: 76 kg (168 lb)

Sport
- Country: Yugoslavia (until 1991); Slovenia (since 1992)
- Sport: Shooting
- Event(s): 10m air rifle, 50m rifle three positions, 50m rifle prone, 300m rifle prone
- Club: SD Olimpija Ljubljana
- Coached by: Alojz Mikolič
Medal record
Men's Shooting
Olympic Games
Representing Slovenia
Gold medal – first place	2000 Sydney	50 m rifle 3 positions
Bronze medal – third place	2008 Beijing	50 m rifle 3 positions
Bronze medal – third place	2012 London	50 m rifle prone
World Championships
Representing Yugoslavia
Silver medal – second place	1990 Moscow	10 m air rifle
Bronze medal – third place	1990 Moscow	50 m rifle 3 positions team
Bronze medal – third place	1990 Moscow	50 m rifle prone team
Representing Slovenia
Gold medal – first place	2002 Lahti	300 m rifle 3 positions
Gold medal – first place	2018 Changwon	300 m rifle prone
Gold medal – first place	2023 Baku	300 m rifle prone
Silver medal – second place	2002 Lahti	50 m rifle prone
Bronze medal – third place	1998 Barcelona	50 m rifle 3 positions
Bronze medal – third place	2006 Zagreb	300 m rifle prone
Bronze medal – third place	2010 Munich	300 m standard rifle team

Rajmond Debevec (born 29 March 1963) is a Slovenian sport shooter. He has won three Olympic and ten World Championship medals in shooting. He formerly held the world record in the 50 meter rifle 3 positions event.

== Career ==
Debevec started shooting in 1971 and became a member of the Yugoslavian junior national team in 1979. Debevec joined the Military Sport Squad of the Slovenian Army in 1991 and holds the rank of Warrant Officer.

=== Olympic Games ===
He won his first medal in 1980 by participating in the Junior European Championships. He represented Yugoslavia at the Olympic Games in 1984 and 1988, and Slovenia in 1992, 1996, 2000, 2004, 2008, and 2012. He won gold at the 2000 Summer Olympics in Sydney, where he competed in the event 50 metre rifle three positions.

His appearance at eight Olympic Games are the most ever by a Slovenian or Yugoslavian athlete. Latvian shooter Afanasijs Kuzmins is the only shooter with more Olympic appearances than Debevec; Kuzmins competed in his ninth games at the 2012 Summer Olympics, where Debevec competed for the eighth time.

=== World Cup and other competitions ===
Debevec formerly held the world record for 50m rifle three position with 1186 points, which he set in Munich at the World Cup Final in 1992. He also held the Olympic record (1177 points) for the same event, which he set during his gold medal-winning performance at the 2000 Summer Olympics.

He has won two world military championships in 300m three positions in 2006 and 300m rapid fire rifle in 2005 and 2008. He has also competed in World Cup events for crossbow, air rifle, small-bore rifle, and big bore rifle.

== Olympic results ==
Event	1984 Los Angeles	1988 Seoul	1992 Barcelona	1996 Atlanta	2000 Sydney	2004 Athens	2008 Beijing	2012 London
50 metre rifle three positions	20th 1140	—	6th 1167+95.6	9th 1166	(gold) Gold; 1177+98.1	4th 1166+96.6	(bronze) Bronze; 1176+95.7	27th 1161
50 metre rifle prone	—	—	18th 594	9th 596	19th 593	9th 594	21st 592	(bronze) Bronze; 596+105.0
10 metre air rifle	12th 580	25th 585	9th 589	6th 591+101.1	9th 591	29th 589	31st 589	—

== See also ==
- List of athletes with the most appearances at Olympic Games

Olympic Games
Preceded by First	Flagbearer for Slovenia; Barcelona 1992	Succeeded by Brigita Bukovec
