= Christian Lusch =

German sport shooter (born 1981)

Christian Lusch (born February 19, 1981, in Bühl (Baden)) is a German sport shooter.

He was born in Bühl (Baden), Germany. He represented Germany at the 2004 Summer Olympic Games, and won the silver medal in the rifle, prone, at 50 metres, and came in 12th in the rifle, prone, three positions, at 50 metres. He shares in the world record at 50 m rifle prone, with a 600 he shot in 2004.

== Current world record in 50 m rifle prone ==
Current world records held in 50 m Rifle Prone
| Men | Qualification | 600 | Viatcheslav Botchkarev (URS); Stevan Pletikosić (YUG); Jean-Pierre Amat (FRA); Christian Klees (GER); Sergei Martynov (BLR); Thomas Tamas (USA); Sergei Martynov (BLR); Sergei Martynov (BLR); Petr Litvinchuk (BLR); Wolfram Waibel Jr. (AUT); Wolfram Waibel Jr. (AUT); Christian Lusch (GER); Eric Uptagrafft (USA); Valérian Sauveplane (FRA); Sergei Martynov (BLR); Sergei Martynov (BLR); Matthew Emmons (USA); Guy Starik (ISR); Sergei Martynov (BLR) | 13 July 1989; 29 August 1991; 27 April 1994; 25 July 1996; 23 May 1997; 28 July 1998; 4 September 1998; 8 June 2000; 11 June 2003; 18 July 2003; 3 March 2004; 27 October 2004; 11 May 2005; 11 May 2005; 26 August 2005; 29 March 2006; 9 May 2007; 18 May 2008; 3 August 2012 | Zagreb (YUG); Munich (GER); Havana (CUB); Atlanta (USA); Munich (GER); Barcelona (ESP); Buenos Aires (ARG); Munich (GER); Munich (GER); Plzeň (CZE); Sydney (AUS); Bangkok (THA); Fort Benning (USA); Fort Benning (USA); Munich (GER); Guangzhou (CHN); Bangkok (THA); Munich (GER); London (ENG) |
