= Stevan Pletikosić =

Serbian sport shooter (born 1972)

Personal information
- Born: 14 March 1972 (age 54) Kragujevac, SR Serbia, SFR Yugoslavia

Sport
- Country: Yugoslavia (1989–1991); Independent Olympic Participants (1992–1994); Serbia and Montenegro (1995–2006); Serbia (2006–)
Medal record
Men's shooting
Olympic Games
Bronze medal – third place	1992 Barcelona	50 m rifle prone
World Championships
Silver medal – second place	1994 Italy	50 m rifle prone
Silver medal – second place	2006 Zagreb	50 m rifle TP
European Championships
Gold medal – first place	2009 Osijek	50m Rifle prone team
Silver medal – second place	1995 Zürich	50 m rifle prone
Silver medal – second place	2017 Maribor	Rifle team
Mediterranean Games
Gold medal – first place	2005 Almería	50 m rifle prone
Silver medal – second place	1997 Bari	50 m rifle prone

Stevan Pletikosić (Serbian Cyrillic: Стеван Плетикосић; born 14 March 1972 in Kragujevac, Serbia, then SFR Yugoslavia) is a sport shooter from Serbia. While still a junior, he won a bronze medal in Men's 50 m Rifle Prone in the 1992 Summer Olympics. The year before, at the 1991 ISSF World Cup in the same event, he had become the only junior ever to achieve the maximum score of 600 in a world-class competition.

Pletikosić started competing in 1982, when he was 10 years old. He won a first medal at the European Championships winning a silver at the 1989 European Shooting Championships in Zagreb, SFR Yugoslavia. During his career, he won another European silver medal and was European champion twice. His first international medal was won at the 1994 ISSF World Shooting Championships, which was also a silver medal. Yugoslav Olympic Committee proclaimed him sportsman of the year in 1994. Pletikosić also won a silver in the 2006 ISSF World Shooting Championships, now in the Three positions event, and he won the 2008 ISSF World Cup competition in the Prone event in Rio de Janeiro.

== Results at the Olympic Games ==
Event	1992	1996	2000	2004	2008	2012	2016
50 metre rifle three positions	—	35th 1156	29th 1156	28th 1153	11th 1168	—	25th 1168
50 metre rifle prone	(bronze) Bronze; 701.1 (597)	11th 595	30th 591	42nd 586	10th 594	—	21st 621.6
10 metre air rifle	—	—	38th 583	39th 586	7th 697.7 (595)	—	—

== World records ==
Current world records held in 50 metre rifle prone
Men	Qualification	600	Viatcheslav Botchkarev (URS); Stevan Pletikosić (YUG); Jean-Pierre Amat (FRA); Christian Klees (GER); Sergei Martynov (BLR); Thomas Tamas (USA); Sergei Martynov (BLR); Sergei Martynov (BLR); Petr Litvinchuk (BLR); Wolfram Waibel Jr. (AUT); Wolfram Waibel Jr. (AUT); Christian Lusch (GER); Eric Uptagrafft (USA); Valérian Sauveplane (FRA); Sergei Martynov (BLR); Sergei Martynov (BLR); Matthew Emmons (USA); Guy Starik (ISR); Sergei Martynov (BLR)	13 July 1989; 29 August 1991; 27 April 1994; 25 July 1996; 23 May 1997; 28 July 1998; 4 September 1998; 8 June 2000; 11 June 2003; 18 July 2003; 3 March 2004; 27 October 2004; 11 May 2005; 11 May 2005; 26 August 2005; 29 March 2006; 9 May 2007; 18 May 2008; 3 August 2012	Zagreb (YUG); Munich (GER); Havana (CUB); Atlanta (USA); Munich (GER); Barcelona (ESP); Buenos Aires (ARG); Munich (GER); Munich (GER); Plzeň (CZE); Sydney (AUS); Bangkok (THA); Fort Benning (USA); Fort Benning (USA); Munich (GER); Guangzhou (CHN); Bangkok (THA); Munich (GER); London (ENG)
Junior Men	Individual	600	Stevan Pletikosić (YUG)	August 29, 1991	Munich (GER)
