= Lionel Cox (sport shooter) =

Belgian sports shooter (born 1981)

Personal information
- Born: 7 November 1981 (age 44) Seraing, Belgium
- Height: 185 cm (6 ft 1 in)
- Weight: 74 kg (163 lb)

Sport
- Country: Belgium
- Sport: Sports shooting
- Event: 50m rifle prone
Medal record
Representing Belgium
Men's shooting
Olympic Games
| Silver medal – second place | 2012 London | 50 m rifle prone |

Lionel Cox (born 11 July 1981) is a Belgian sports shooter. He competed in the men's 50 metre rifle prone event at the 2012 Summer Olympics. He qualified as second for the final with 8 shooters with a score of 599 out of 600. He finished the final as second, winning the silver medal.

== Olympic results ==
| Event | 2012 |
|---|---|
| 50 metre rifle prone | (silver) Silver; 599+102.2 |
