= Philippe Joualin =

French sports shooter (born 1972)

Philippe Joualin (born 25 January 1972) is a French sport shooter who competed in the 2000 Summer Olympics.
