= Matthew Emmons =

American Olympic sports shooter (born 1981)

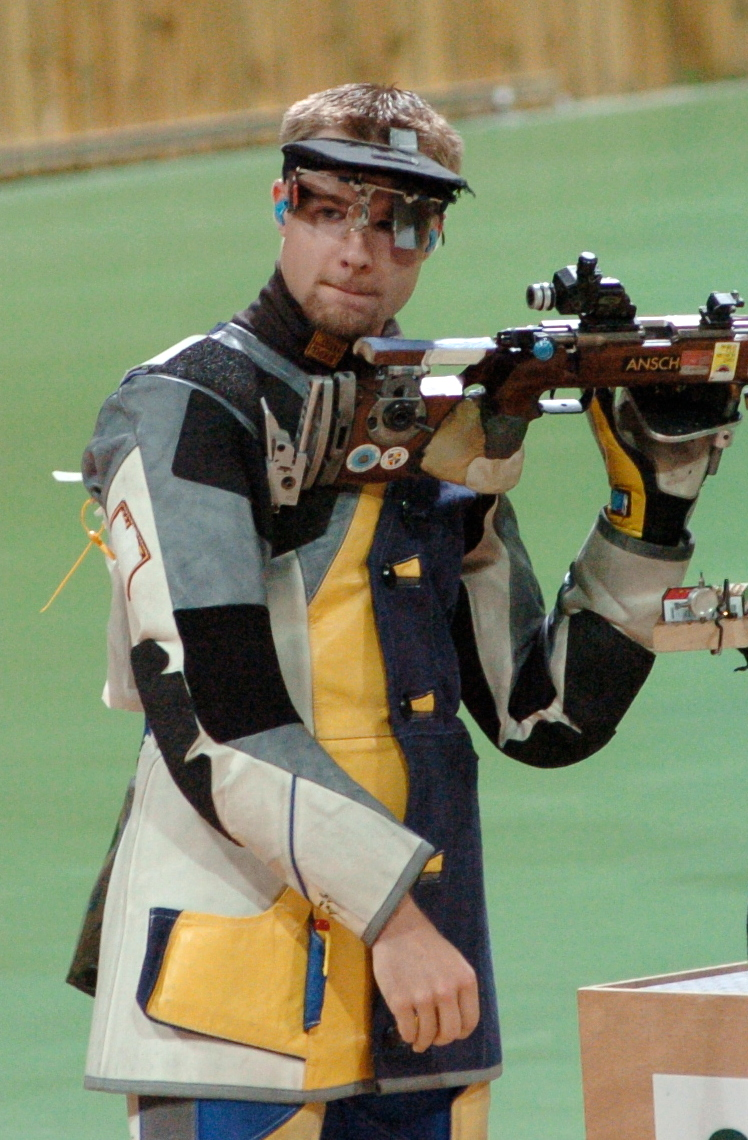
- Emmons at the 2004 Olympics

Personal information
- Nationality: American Czech
- Born: April 5, 1981 (age 45) Mount Holly Township, New Jersey, U.S.
- Height: 1.78 m (5 ft 10 in)
- Weight: 85 kg (187 lb)

Sport
- Country: United States
- Sport: Shooting
- Event: Rifle
- Club: Alaska Nanooks, Fairbanks
Medal record
Representing the United States
Olympic Games
Gold medal – first place	2004 Athens	50 m rifle prone
Silver medal – second place	2008 Beijing	50 m rifle prone
Bronze medal – third place	2012 London	50 m rifle three positions
World Championships
Silver medal – second place	2018 Changwon	50 m team rifle prone

Matthew D. Emmons (born April 5, 1981) is an American rifle shooter. He competed in various events at the 2004, 2008, 2012 and 2016 Olympics and won a gold, a silver, and a bronze medal.

Since 2020 he has been the shooting coach of the Czech biathlon team.

== Career ==
Emmons started out as a successful junior and has been a holder of the junior world record in 50 metre rifle three positions. He won both the 2002 ISSF World Cup Final and the 2004 ISSF World Cup Final in this event.

He was also successful in the 50 metre rifle prone, winning both the 2002 ISSF World Shooting Championships and the 2004 Summer Olympics in this event. In Athens, he was very close to winning a historic double, but in the three positions competition, he accidentally cross-fired his last shot and finished eighth.

Emmons's gold medal at the 2004 Summer Olympics in the prone position came while using a borrowed rifle. In April 2004, just prior to the Olympic Team Trials, Emmons discovered his rifle had been severely sabotaged in the supposedly secure locker room at the United States Olympic Training Center. The precisely tuned barrel and action were heavily damaged by what appeared to be a screwdriver. "I unpacked my gun and I noticed that something wasn't right," Emmons said. "Sure enough, somebody had done something to it. I shot it and I couldn't get the shell out. I said, 'Something's wrong here'." Emmons said it could not have been an accident: "Oh no, no," Emmons said. "Somebody took a screwdriver and went in." Emmons went on to the 2004 Summer Olympics, and his gold medal in the prone position event, using his former University of Alaska Fairbanks teammate, Amber Darland's .22 rifle. He never found out who the saboteur was, but said "I'd like to know so I could shake their hand and say thanks."

At the 2008 Summer Olympics, Emmons won the silver medal in the prone competition. In his second event, 50 metre rifle three positions, Emmons finished the qualification round in second place, 1 point behind the leader. In the ten-shot final, Emmons overtook the leader after just the first shot. Over the next eight shots, Emmons extended his lead to 3.3 points. Then his 3.3 point lead vanished when he posted a 4.4 on his final shot. He finished off the podium in 4th place.

Emmons called the last shot a "freak of nature". "The way I come into a target is I start above the target and come down from 12 o'clock and get into the bullseye", he told reporters. "And as I get down into the bullseye is when I start to get on the trigger (with my finger) and as I was starting to get on the trigger, the gun just went off. I guess I just set it off. I got on the trigger a little too hard. I didn't feel my trigger finger shaking but I guess it was. It just hit the trigger, the gun went off and I was like 'uh, that's not going to be good – I hope it hit the black'. It hit the black, but a little high".

At the 2012 Summer Olympics, Emmons won the bronze medal in the three positions. He placed 19th in this event at the 2016 Games.

Current world records held in 50 m Rifle Prone
Men	Qualification	600	Viatcheslav Botchkarev (URS); Stevan Pletikosić (YUG); Jean-Pierre Amat (FRA); Christian Klees (GER); Sergei Martynov (BLR); Thomas Tamas (USA); Sergei Martynov (BLR); Sergei Martynov (BLR); Petr Litvinchuk (BLR); Wolfram Waibel Jr. (AUT); Wolfram Waibel Jr. (AUT); Christian Lusch (GER); Eric Uptagrafft (USA); Valérian Sauveplane (FRA); Sergei Martynov (BLR); Sergei Martynov (BLR); Matthew Emmons (USA); Guy Starik (ISR); Sergei Martynov (BLR)	13 July 1989; 29 August 1991; 27 April 1994; 25 July 1996; 23 May 1997; 28 July 1998; 4 September 1998; 8 June 2000; 11 June 2003; 18 July 2003; 3 March 2004; 27 October 2004; 11 May 2005; 11 May 2005; 26 August 2005; 29 March 2006; 9 May 2007; 18 May 2008; 3 August 2012	Zagreb (YUG); Munich (GER); Havana (CUB); Atlanta (USA); Munich (GER); Barcelona (ESP); Buenos Aires (ARG); Munich (GER); Munich (GER); Plzeň (CZE); Sydney (AUS); Bangkok (THA); Fort Benning (USA); Fort Benning (USA); Munich (GER); Guangzhou (CHN); Bangkok (THA); Munich (GER); London (ENG)

== Personal life ==
Emmons has been a resident of Pemberton Township, New Jersey. He is a graduate of Pemberton Township High School. He holds a degree in management and finance from the University of Alaska Fairbanks and is a graduate at the University of Colorado at Colorado Springs, Colorado Springs.

Emmons married Czech sport shooter and Olympic champion Kateřina Kůrková in Plzeň, Czech Republic, on June 30, 2007. They met at the 2004 Olympics in Athens when Kateřina came to console Matt after his gold medal blunder. They both live and train in Plzeň. They have four children, Julie (born 2009), Emma (born 2015), Martin and Gabriela. Emmons was diagnosed with thyroid cancer in 2010.
