= Michael McPhail =

American sport shooter (born 1981)

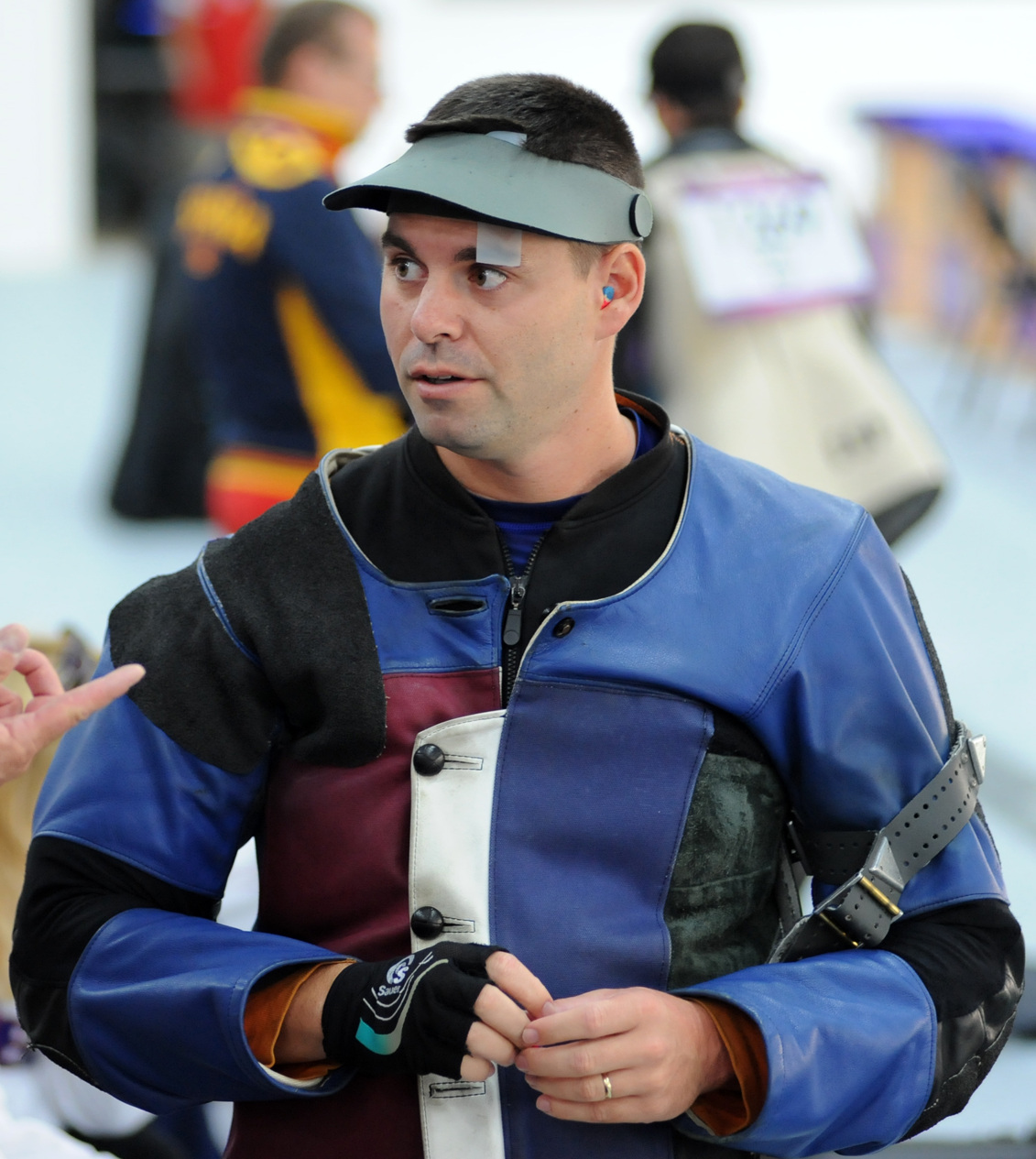
- McPhail at the 2012 Summer Olympics

Personal information
- Nationality: American
- Born: December 15, 1981 (age 44) Darlington, Wisconsin, United States
- Education: University of Wisconsin–Oshkosh
- Height: 6 ft 0 in (183 cm)
- Weight: 195 lb (88 kg)

Sport
- Country: United States
- Sport: Sports shooting
- Event: FR60PR
- Club: US Army Marksmanship Unit, Fort Benning, Georgia
Medal record
Representing United States
Men's shooting
World Championships
Silver medal – second place	2018 Changwon	50 m team rifle prone
Bronze medal – third place	2018 Changwon	50 m rifle 3 positions
Pan American Games
Gold medal – first place	2011 Guadalajara	50 m rifle prone
Silver medal – second place	2007 Rio de Janeiro	50 m rifle prone
Silver medal – second place	2015 Toronto	50 m rifle prone
Silver medal – second place	2019 Lima	50 m rifle 3 positions

Michael McPhail (born December 15, 1981) is an American rifle shooter. He won a gold medal in the 50 metre rifle prone event at the 2011 Pan American Games. He competed in the 50 metre rifle prone event at the 2012 Summer Olympics, where he placed 9th. In the same event at the 2016 Summer Olympics, he placed 19th.

McPhail started training in shooting in 1996. He attended the University of Wisconsin–Oshkosh, where he competed on the rifle team. On August 16, 2004, he enlisted in the U.S. Army. After completing basic and infantry training at Fort Benning, in early 2005 he was assigned to the U.S. Army Marksmanship Unit.
