= Petr Litvinchuk =

Belarusian sport shooter

Personal information
- Born: 14 April 1976 (age 48)

Sport
- Country: Belarus
- Sport: Sport shooting

Petr Litvinchuk (born 14 April 1976) is a sport shooter from Belarus. He was born in Brest, Belarus, and lives in Minsk, Belarus.

He competed for Belarus in the 2008 Summer Olympics, coming in 17th in the Men's 50m rifle prone.

He shares the world record in the 50 meter rifle prone competition, with a 600 he shot in 2003.

== Current world record in 50 m rifle prone ==
Current world records held in 50 m Rifle Prone
Men	Qualification	600	Viatcheslav Botchkarev (URS); Stevan Pletikosić (YUG); Jean-Pierre Amat (FRA); Christian Klees (GER); Sergei Martynov (BLR); Thomas Tamas (USA); Sergei Martynov (BLR); Sergei Martynov (BLR); Petr Litvinchuk (BLR); Wolfram Waibel Jr. (AUT); Wolfram Waibel Jr. (AUT); Christian Lusch (GER); Eric Uptagrafft (USA); Valérian Sauveplane (FRA); Sergei Martynov (BLR); Sergei Martynov (BLR); Matthew Emmons (USA); Guy Starik (ISR); Sergei Martynov (BLR)	13 July 1989; 29 August 1991; 27 April 1994; 25 July 1996; 23 May 1997; 28 July 1998; 4 September 1998; 8 June 2000; 11 June 2003; 18 July 2003; 3 March 2004; 27 October 2004; 11 May 2005; 11 May 2005; 26 August 2005; 29 March 2006; 9 May 2007; 18 May 2008; 3 August 2012	Zagreb (YUG); Munich (GER); Havana (CUB); Atlanta (USA); Munich (GER); Barcelona (ESP); Buenos Aires (ARG); Munich (GER); Munich (GER); Plzeň (CZE); Sydney (AUS); Bangkok (THA); Fort Benning (USA); Fort Benning (USA); Munich (GER); Guangzhou (CHN); Bangkok (THA); Munich (GER); London (ENG)
