= Franck Badiou =

French sport shooter

Personal information
- Born: 24 March 1967 (age 59) Vitry-sur-Seine, Val-de-Marne, France
Medal record
Men's shooting
Representing France
Olympic Games
Silver medal – second place	1992 Barcelona	10 m air rifle

Franck Badiou (born 24 March 1967) is a French former sports shooter, Olympic medallist and coach. He won silver medal in the 10 metre air rifle at the 1992 Summer Olympics in Barcelona. He was also European Champion in the same discipline in 1993.

Badiou was born in Vitry-sur-Seine, Val-de-Marne. He took up shooting relatively late, at the age of 14, after talking about the sport with a school friend who was a pistol shooter.

After retiring from competition, Badiou was a coach for the French Shooting Federation for eight years. In 2005, he started working for the French biathlon team, preparing the squad's rifles. In 2016, he was appointed as the men's team's shooting coach. Badiou stepped down from the role in 2018, being succeeded by Patrick Favre.
