= Guy Starik =

Israeli sport shooter (born 1965)

Personal information
- Native name: גיא סטאריק
- Born: May 3, 1965 (age 61) Jerusalem
- Height: 5 ft 11 in (180 cm)
- Weight: 165 lb (75 kg)

Sport
- Country: Israel
- Sport: Sport shooting
- Event: 50 metre rifle prone (primary event)
- Club: Hapoel Maabarot Club
- Coached by: Yair Davidovic

Achievements and titles
- Personal bests: 600 (world record; 50 metre rifle prone)

Guy Starik (Hebrew: גיא סטאריק; born May 3, 1965) is an Israeli sport shooter who has competed in four Olympics. He has won gold medals in shooting at both the European Championships and at four World Cups, and shares the world record in the 50 meter rifle prone competition.

== Biography ==
Starik is Jewish, and was born in Jerusalem.

=== Shooting career ===
In his early years of competition, Starik did not have an experienced coach, and was self-taught. He started shooting in 1978, and started to compete in shooting in 1982. He practices at the National Olympic Ranges in Herzliya.

He competed on behalf of Israel at the 1996 Summer Olympics in Atlanta, United States, in the Men's 50 metre rifle three positions, in which he came in 13th, and in the Men's 50 metre rifle prone, in which he came in 26th.

In 1998, Starik finished fourth at the 1998 World Championships in Barcelona, Spain.

He competed on behalf of Israel at the 2000 Summer Olympics in Sydney, Australia, despite a bout of meningitis, in the Men's 50 metre rifle three positions, in which he came in 32nd, and in the Men's 50 metre rifle prone, in which he came in 25th.

In 2003, Starik won a gold medal at the World Cup Marksman Championship in Munich, Germany, in the Men's 50 metre rifle three positions. His total of 702.5 points was a new Israeli record. The following year, he was ranked second in the world in his event by the International Shooting Sport Federation (ISSF).

He competed on behalf of Israel at the 2004 Summer Olympics in Athens, Greece, in the Men's 50 metre rifle prone, in which he came in 16th.

In 2005, Starik won the gold medal in the Men's 50 metre rifle prone at the European Championships in Belgrade, Serbia & Montenegro. In 2006, he won a bronze medal at the ISSF World Cup Final in Granada, Spain.

In May 2008, he tied the world record and set a new Israeli record in the 50-meter rifle prone competition, with a perfect 600 score at the 2008 ISSF Rifle & Pistol World Cup in Munich, Germany.

Starik competed on behalf of Israel at the 2008 Summer Olympics in Beijing, China, in the Men's 50 metre rifle prone, in which he came in 12th.

In May 2009, he won the Men's 50 metre rifle prone event at the 2009 ISSF World Cup in Munich, Germany, ahead of 2004 Olympic champion Matthew Emmons. It was his fourth world cup gold medal; he had previously won World Cups in 1997 in Milan, in 2003 in Munich, and in 2004 in Athens.

In 2010, Starik finished fifth at the 2010 World Championships in Munich with a 598, and won a silver medal at the 2010 ISSF World Cup in Belgrade with a 597.

=== Current world record in 50 m rifle prone ===
Current world records held in 50 m Rifle Prone
Men	Qualification	600	Viatcheslav Botchkarev (URS); Stevan Pletikosić (YUG); Jean-Pierre Amat (FRA); Christian Klees (GER); Sergei Martynov (BLR); Thomas Tamas (USA); Sergei Martynov (BLR); Sergei Martynov (BLR); Petr Litvinchuk (BLR); Wolfram Waibel Jr. (AUT); Wolfram Waibel Jr. (AUT); Christian Lusch (GER); Eric Uptagrafft (USA); Valérian Sauveplane (FRA); Sergei Martynov (BLR); Sergei Martynov (BLR); Matthew Emmons (USA); Guy Starik (ISR); Sergei Martynov (BLR)	13 July 1989; 29 August 1991; 27 April 1994; 25 July 1996; 23 May 1997; 28 July 1998; 4 September 1998; 8 June 2000; 11 June 2003; 18 July 2003; 3 March 2004; 27 October 2004; 11 May 2005; 11 May 2005; 26 August 2005; 29 March 2006; 9 May 2007; 18 May 2008; 3 August 2012	Zagreb (YUG); Munich (GER); Havana (CUB); Atlanta (USA); Munich (GER); Barcelona (ESP); Buenos Aires (ARG); Munich (GER); Munich (GER); Plzeň (CZE); Sydney (AUS); Bangkok (THA); Fort Benning (USA); Fort Benning (USA); Munich (GER); Guangzhou (CHN); Bangkok (THA); Munich (GER); London (ENG)

=== Coaching career ===
Starik also coaches Israeli Olympic sport shooters Doron Egozi and Gil Simkovitch, and 2012 Olympian Sergei Richter.

== See also ==
- List of select Jewish shooters
