= Jean-Pierre Amat =

French sport shooter (born 1962)

Medal record

Men's shooting

Representing France

Olympic Games
Gold medal – first place	1996 Atlanta	50 m rifle 3 pos
Bronze medal – third place	1996 Atlanta	10 m air rifle

Jean-Pierre Amat (born 13 June 1962 in Chambéry, Savoie) is a French sport shooter who competed and won a gold medal at the 1996 Summer Olympics in the small bore rifle, three positions event.

Olympic results
Event	1984	1988	1992	1996	2000
50 metre rifle three positions	7th 1150	13th 1169	16th 1159	(gold) Gold; 1175+98.9 OR FOR	22nd 1158
50 metre rifle prone	11th 593	32nd 593	26th 592	—	30th 591
10 metre air rifle	—	—	4th 590+101.6	(bronze) Bronze; 591+102.1	18th 588

== Current world record in 50 m rifle prone ==
Current world records held in 50 m Rifle Prone
Men	Qualification	600	Viatcheslav Botchkarev (URS); Stevan Pletikosić (YUG); Jean-Pierre Amat (FRA); Christian Klees (GER); Sergei Martynov (BLR); Thomas Tamas (USA); Sergei Martynov (BLR); Sergei Martynov (BLR); Petr Litvinchuk (BLR); Wolfram Waibel Jr. (AUT); Wolfram Waibel Jr. (AUT); Christian Lusch (GER); Eric Uptagrafft (USA); Valérian Sauveplane (FRA); Sergei Martynov (BLR); Sergei Martynov (BLR); Matthew Emmons (USA); Guy Starik (ISR); Sergei Martynov (BLR)	13 July 1989; 29 August 1991; 27 April 1994; 25 July 1996; 23 May 1997; 28 July 1998; 4 September 1998; 8 June 2000; 11 June 2003; 18 July 2003; 3 March 2004; 27 October 2004; 11 May 2005; 11 May 2005; 26 August 2005; 29 March 2006; 9 May 2007; 18 May 2008; 3 August 2012	Zagreb (YUG); Munich (GER); Havana (CUB); Atlanta (USA); Munich (GER); Barcelona (ESP); Buenos Aires (ARG); Munich (GER); Munich (GER); Plzeň (CZE); Sydney (AUS); Bangkok (THA); Fort Benning (USA); Fort Benning (USA); Munich (GER); Guangzhou (CHN); Bangkok (THA); Munich (GER); London (ENG)
