= Sergei Martynov (sport shooter) =

Belarusian sport shooter

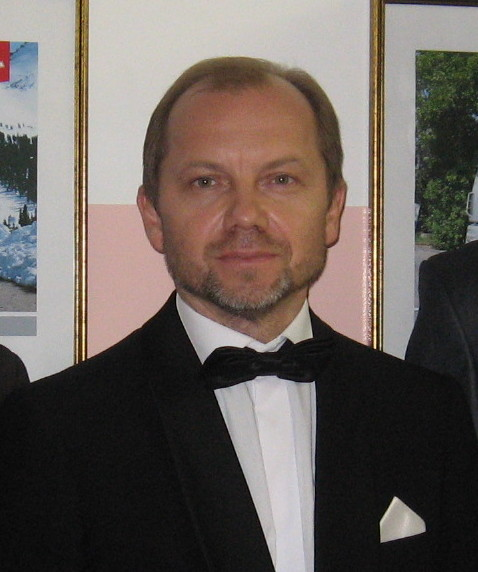

Personal information
- Native name: Сяргей Анатолевіч Мартынаў
- Born: 18 May 1968 (age 58) Vereya, Naro-Fominsky District, Moscow Oblast, Russian SFSR, Soviet Union
Medal record
Representing Belarus
Men's shooting
Olympic Games
Gold medal – first place	2012 London	50 m rifle prone
Bronze medal – third place	2000 Sydney	50 m rifle prone
Bronze medal – third place	2004 Athens	50 m rifle prone
European Championships
Silver medal – second place	2013 Osijek	50 m rifle prone team
Bronze medal – third place	2013 Osijek	50 m rifle prone
European Games
Bronze medal – third place	2015 Baku	50 m rifle prone

Sergei Martynov (Belarusian: Сяргей Анатолевіч Мартынаў; new transliteration Siarhei Martynau, Łacinka Siarhiej Anatolevič Martynaŭ) (born 18 May 1968) is a Belarusian 50 m rifle shooter. He is the 2012 Olympic champion in the 50 m rifle prone event.

== Life and career ==
Martynov was born in Vereya, Naro-Fominsky District, Moscow Oblast, Russian SFSR. Although a world-class competitor in the three positions event, he achieved his greatest successes in the prone event. He won bronze medals in the 50 m rifle prone events at the 2000 Summer Olympics in Sydney and 2004 Summer Olympics in Athens.

Martynov won gold at the 2006 ISSF World Shooting Championships. He also has numerous victories in ISSF World Cups and World Cup Finals. He has reached the maximum score of 600 points six times in competition, more than any other shooter.

In 2012, at age 44, he won his first Olympic gold medal, in the 50 m rifle prone event at the 2012 Summer Olympics in London.

== Olympic results ==
Event	1988	1992	1996	2000	2004	2008	2012
50 metre rifle three positions	—	—	8th 1166+97.9	9th 1164	29th 1152	34th 1156	—
50 metre rifle prone	—	—	6th 598+101.6	(bronze) Bronze; 598+102.3	(bronze) Bronze; 596+105.6	8th 595+103.3	(gold) Gold; 600+105.5
10 metre air rifle	14th 588	—	—	—	—	—	—

== Records ==
Current world records held in 50 m Rifle Prone
Men	Qualification	600	Viatcheslav Botchkarev (URS); Stevan Pletikosić (YUG); Jean-Pierre Amat (FRA); Christian Klees (GER); Sergei Martynov (BLR); Thomas Tamas (USA); Sergei Martynov (BLR); Sergei Martynov (BLR); Petr Litvinchuk (BLR); Wolfram Waibel Jr. (AUT); Wolfram Waibel Jr. (AUT); Christian Lusch (GER); Eric Uptagrafft (USA); Valérian Sauveplane (FRA); Sergei Martynov (BLR); Sergei Martynov (BLR); Matthew Emmons (USA); Guy Starik (ISR); Sergei Martynov (BLR)	13 July 1989; 29 August 1991; 27 April 1994; 25 July 1996; 23 May 1997; 28 July 1998; 4 September 1998; 8 June 2000; 11 June 2003; 18 July 2003; 3 March 2004; 27 October 2004; 11 May 2005; 11 May 2005; 26 August 2005; 29 March 2006; 9 May 2007; 18 May 2008; 3 August 2012	Zagreb (YUG); Munich (GER); Havana (CUB); Atlanta (USA); Munich (GER); Barcelona (ESP); Buenos Aires (ARG); Munich (GER); Munich (GER); Plzeň (CZE); Sydney (AUS); Bangkok (THA); Fort Benning (USA); Fort Benning (USA); Munich (GER); Guangzhou (CHN); Bangkok (THA); Munich (GER); London (ENG)
