= Valérian Sauveplane =

French sport shooter (born 1980)

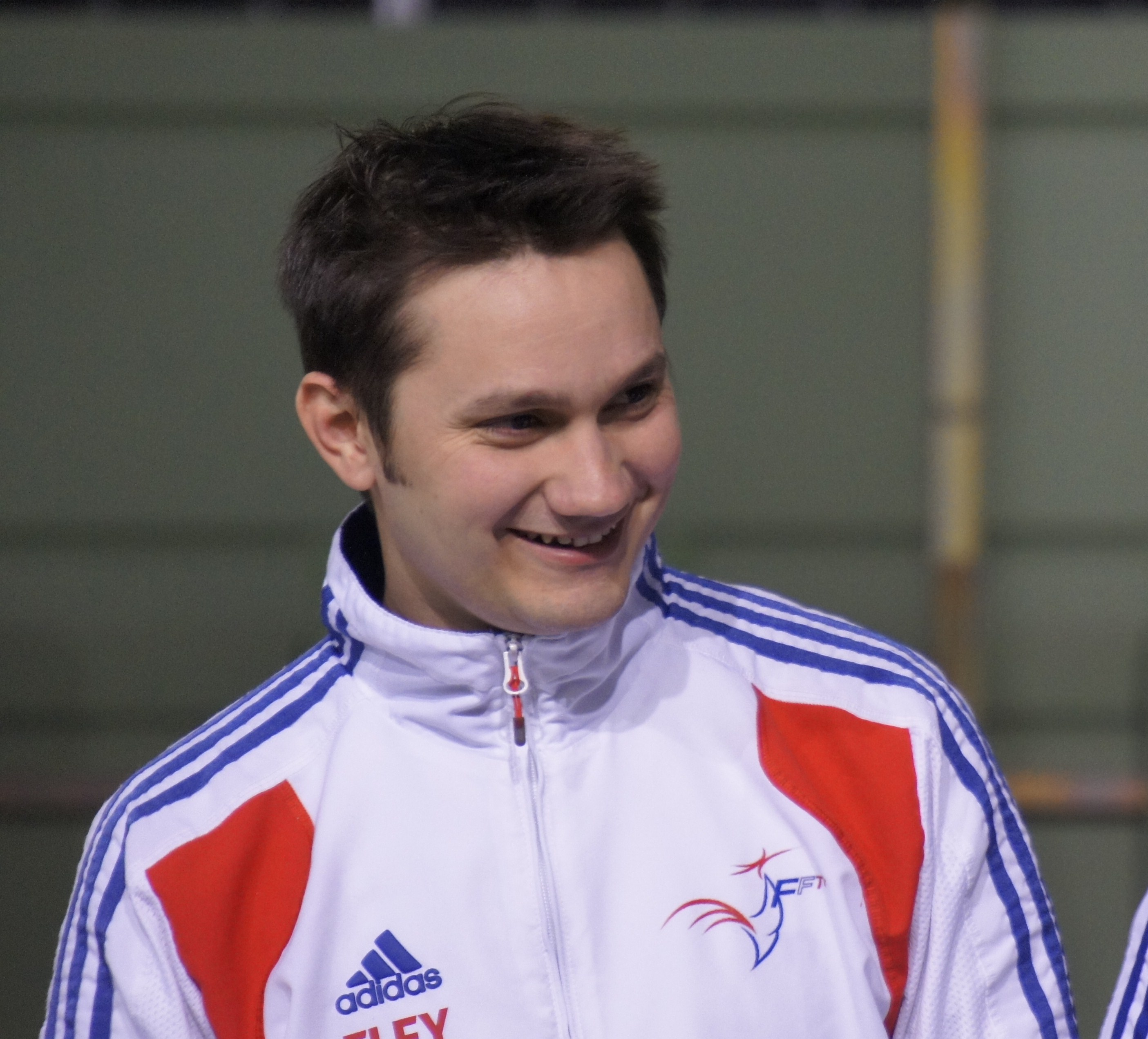

Personal information
- Nationality: French
- Born: 25 July 1980 (age 46) Montpellier, France
- Height: 1.80 m (5 ft 11 in)
- Weight: 79 kg (174 lb)

Sport
- Country: France
- Sport: Shooting
- Event: Air rifle
- Club: S.T.C. Millavoise
Medal record
Representing France
World Championships
Gold medal – first place	2018 Changwon	300 m team rifle prone
Bronze medal – third place	2018 Changwon	300 m team rifle 3 positions
European Championships
Gold medal – first place	Osijek 2013	50 m rifle prone
Gold medal – first place	Osijek 2013	50 m rifle prone team
Gold medal – first place	Osijek 2013	50 m rifle 3 positions team
Gold medal – first place	Osijek 2013	300 m rifle prone team
Gold medal – first place	Osijek 2013	300 m rifle 3 pos team
Silver medal – second place	Osijek 2013	50 m rifle 3 positions
Bronze medal – third place	Osijek 2013	300 m rifle prone

Valérian Sauveplane (born 25 July 1980) is a French sport shooter.

He was born in Montpellier, France. He competed for France in the 2008 Summer Olympics and 2012 Summer Olympics. He shares the world record in the 50 meter rifle prone competition.

== Current world record in 50 m rifle prone ==
Current world records held in 50 m Rifle Prone
Men	Qualification	600	Viatcheslav Botchkarev (URS); Stevan Pletikosić (YUG); Jean-Pierre Amat (FRA); Christian Klees (GER); Sergei Martynov (BLR); Thomas Tamas (USA); Sergei Martynov (BLR); Sergei Martynov (BLR); Petr Litvinchuk (BLR); Wolfram Waibel Jr. (AUT); Wolfram Waibel Jr. (AUT); Christian Lusch (GER); Eric Uptagrafft (USA); Valérian Sauveplane (FRA); Sergei Martynov (BLR); Sergei Martynov (BLR); Matthew Emmons (USA); Guy Starik (ISR); Sergei Martynov (BLR)	13 July 1989; 29 August 1991; 27 April 1994; 25 July 1996; 23 May 1997; 28 July 1998; 4 September 1998; 8 June 2000; 11 June 2003; 18 July 2003; 3 March 2004; 27 October 2004; 11 May 2005; 11 May 2005; 26 August 2005; 29 March 2006; 9 May 2007; 18 May 2008; 3 August 2012	Zagreb (YUG); Munich (GER); Havana (CUB); Atlanta (USA); Munich (GER); Barcelona (ESP); Buenos Aires (ARG); Munich (GER); Munich (GER); Plzeň (CZE); Sydney (AUS); Bangkok (THA); Fort Benning (USA); Fort Benning (USA); Munich (GER); Guangzhou (CHN); Bangkok (THA); Munich (GER); London (ENG)
