= Thomas Tamas =

American sports shooter

Personal information
- Born: June 11, 1965 (age 61) Honolulu, Hawaii, United States

Sport
- Sport: Sport shooting
Medal record
Representing United States
Pan American Games
| Gold medal – first place | 1991 Havana | 50m rifle prone |
| Gold medal – first place | 2003 Santo Domingo | 50m rifle prone |
| Gold medal – first place | 2007 Rio de Janeiro | 50m rifle prone |
| Silver medal – second place | 1991 Havana | 50m rifle standing |
| Bronze medal – third place | 1991 Havana | 50m rifle kneeling |

Thomas A. "Tom" Tamas (born June 11, 1965) is an American sport shooter.

He was born in Honolulu, Hawaii. He competed for the United States in the 2000 Summer Olympics, in the Men's Small-Bore Rifle, Prone, 50, coming in tied for 13th. He shares the world record in the 50 meter rifle prone competition.

== Current world record in 50 m rifle prone ==
Current world records held in 50 m Rifle Prone
| Men | Qualification | 600 | Viatcheslav Botchkarev (URS); Stevan Pletikosić (YUG); Jean-Pierre Amat (FRA); Christian Klees (GER); Sergei Martynov (BLR); Thomas Tamas (USA); Sergei Martynov (BLR); Sergei Martynov (BLR); Petr Litvinchuk (BLR); Wolfram Waibel Jr. (AUT); Wolfram Waibel Jr. (AUT); Christian Lusch (GER); Eric Uptagrafft (USA); Valérian Sauveplane (FRA); Sergei Martynov (BLR); Sergei Martynov (BLR); Matthew Emmons (USA); Guy Starik (ISR); Sergei Martynov (BLR) | 13 July 1989; 29 August 1991; 27 April 1994; 25 July 1996; 23 May 1997; 28 July 1998; 4 September 1998; 8 June 2000; 11 June 2003; 18 July 2003; 3 March 2004; 27 October 2004; 11 May 2005; 11 May 2005; 26 August 2005; 29 March 2006; 9 May 2007; 18 May 2008; 3 August 2012 | Zagreb (YUG); Munich (GER); Havana (CUB); Atlanta (USA); Munich (GER); Barcelona (ESP); Buenos Aires (ARG); Munich (GER); Munich (GER); Plzeň (CZE); Sydney (AUS); Bangkok (THA); Fort Benning (USA); Fort Benning (USA); Munich (GER); Guangzhou (CHN); Bangkok (THA); Munich (GER); London (ENG) |
