= Alex Suligoy =

Argentine sports shooter

Personal information
- Born: 3 December 1990 (age 35) Malabrigo, Santa Fe, Argentina

Sport
- Sport: Sport shooting
Medal record
Representing Argentina
Pan American Games
Silver medal – second place	2011 Guadalajara	50m rifle prone

Alex Misael Suligoy (born 3 December 1990) is an Argentine rifle shooter. He competed in the 50 m rifle prone event at the 2012 Summer Olympics, where he placed 20th. Alex won the silver medal at the 2011 Pan American Games.
