= Nils Petter Håkedal =

Norwegian sports shooter (born 1968)

Personal information
- Nationality: Norwegian
- Born: 4 April 1968 (age 57); Tønsberg, Norway

Sport
- Sport: Sports shooting

Nils Petter Håkedal (born 4 April 1968) is a Norwegian sports shooter. He competed at the 1992 Summer Olympics and the 1996 Summer Olympics.
