= Wolf Creek Shooting Complex =

Shooting range in Georgia, US

Coordinates: 33°40′27″N 84°34′3″W

The Wolf Creek Shooting Complex, now known as the Tom Lowe Shooting Grounds, is a shooting range in Fulton County, Georgia, United States, southwest of Atlanta. During the 1996 Summer Olympics it hosted the shooting event. Until 2002, it was also often used for ISSF World Cup competitions in rifle and pistol events, although such competitions in the United States have reverted to being carried out at Fort Benning.

The venue is owned by the Parks & Recreation Department of Fulton County.

It has 20 trap and skeet shooting combination fields, and nine lighted areas.

The facility has been host to several NSSA State and Zone skeet tournaments.

The range is also home to recreational shooting leagues such as the Atlanta Skeet League and the Atlanta Trap League.
