= Christian Klees =

German sports shooter

Olympic medal record

Men's shooting
Gold medal – first place	1996 Atlanta	50 m rifle prone

Christian Klees (born 24 June 1968 in Eutin) is a German former sport shooter, the first shooter since the 1989 target change to have achieved the maximum score (600) in the 50 metre rifle prone event at the Olympic Games, which was later replicated by Sergei Martynov at the 2012 Summer Olympics. He did this in at the 1996 Summer Olympics in Atlanta, Georgia. His excellent final of 104.8 (out of maximal 109.0) also gave him the gold medal, as well as an aggregate result that was eventually surpassed by Martynov during the 2012 Summer Olympics, 16 years after his victory in Atlanta. Klees left the international shooting scene after the 2001 season.

Current world records held in 50 metre rifle prone
Men	Qualification	600	Viatcheslav Botchkarev (URS); Stevan Pletikosić (YUG); Jean-Pierre Amat (FRA); Christian Klees (GER); Sergei Martynov (BLR); Thomas Tamas (USA); Sergei Martynov (BLR); Sergei Martynov (BLR); Petr Litvinchuk (BLR); Wolfram Waibel Jr. (AUT); Wolfram Waibel Jr. (AUT); Christian Lusch (GER); Eric Uptagrafft (USA); Valérian Sauveplane (FRA); Sergei Martynov (BLR); Sergei Martynov (BLR); Matthew Emmons (USA); Guy Starik (ISR); Sergei Martynov (BLR)	13 July 1989; 29 August 1991; 27 April 1994; 25 July 1996; 23 May 1997; 28 July 1998; 4 September 1998; 8 June 2000; 11 June 2003; 18 July 2003; 3 March 2004; 27 October 2004; 11 May 2005; 11 May 2005; 26 August 2005; 29 March 2006; 9 May 2007; 18 May 2008; 3 August 2012	Zagreb (YUG); Munich (GER); Havana (CUB); Atlanta (USA); Munich (GER); Barcelona (ESP); Buenos Aires (ARG); Munich (GER); Munich (GER); Plzeň (CZE); Sydney (AUS); Bangkok (THA); Fort Benning (USA); Fort Benning (USA); Munich (GER); Guangzhou (CHN); Bangkok (THA); Munich (GER); London (ENG)
Men	Individual	705.5	Sergei Martynov (BLR) (600+105.5)	3 August 2012	London (UK)
