= Wolfram Waibel Jr. =

Austrian sports shooter (born 1970)

Olympic medal record

Men's shooting

Representing Austria
Silver medal – second place	1996 Atlanta	10 m air rifle
Bronze medal – third place	1996 Atlanta	50 m rifle 3 positions

Wolfram Waibel Jr. (born 22 February 1970) is an Austrian sport shooter.

He was born in Hohenems, Austria. His father was Wolfram Waibel Sr., who competed at five Olympic Games as a rifle shooter. Wolfram Jr. competed for Austria and won both a silver medal and a bronze medal in the 1996 Summer Olympics. He shared the world record in the 50 meter rifle prone competition.

After retirement, he became National Coach.

== Current world record in 50 m rifle prone ==
Weibel was a joint World Record holder in the 50m Prone Rifle event with a perfect score of 600. In 2013 the format changed from integer scoring to decimal, resetting the records.

Current world records held in 50 m Rifle Prone
Men	Qualification	600	Viatcheslav Botchkarev (URS); Stevan Pletikosić (YUG); Jean-Pierre Amat (FRA); Christian Klees (GER); Sergei Martynov (BLR); Thomas Tamas (USA); Sergei Martynov (BLR); Sergei Martynov (BLR); Petr Litvinchuk (BLR); Wolfram Waibel Jr. (AUT); Wolfram Waibel Jr. (AUT); Christian Lusch (GER); Eric Uptagrafft (USA); Valérian Sauveplane (FRA); Sergei Martynov (BLR); Sergei Martynov (BLR); Matthew Emmons (USA); Guy Starik (ISR); Sergei Martynov (BLR)	13 July 1989; 29 August 1991; 27 April 1994; 25 July 1996; 23 May 1997; 28 July 1998; 4 September 1998; 8 June 2000; 11 June 2003; 18 July 2003; 3 March 2004; 27 October 2004; 11 May 2005; 11 May 2005; 26 August 2005; 29 March 2006; 9 May 2007; 18 May 2008; 3 August 2012	Zagreb (YUG); Munich (GER); Havana (CUB); Atlanta (USA); Munich (GER); Barcelona (ESP); Buenos Aires (ARG); Munich (GER); Munich (GER); Plzeň (CZE); Sydney (AUS); Bangkok (THA); Fort Benning (USA); Fort Benning (USA); Munich (GER); Guangzhou (CHN); Bangkok (THA); Munich (GER); London (ENG)
