= Andi Zumbach =

Swiss sports shooter (born 1969)

Personal information
- Nationality: Swiss
- Born: 24 November 1969 (age 55); Baar, Switzerland

Sport
- Sport: Sports shooting

Andi Zumbach (born 24 November 1969) is a Swiss sports shooter. He competed at the 1992 Summer Olympics and the 1996 Summer Olympics.
