= Eric Uptagrafft =

American sport shooter

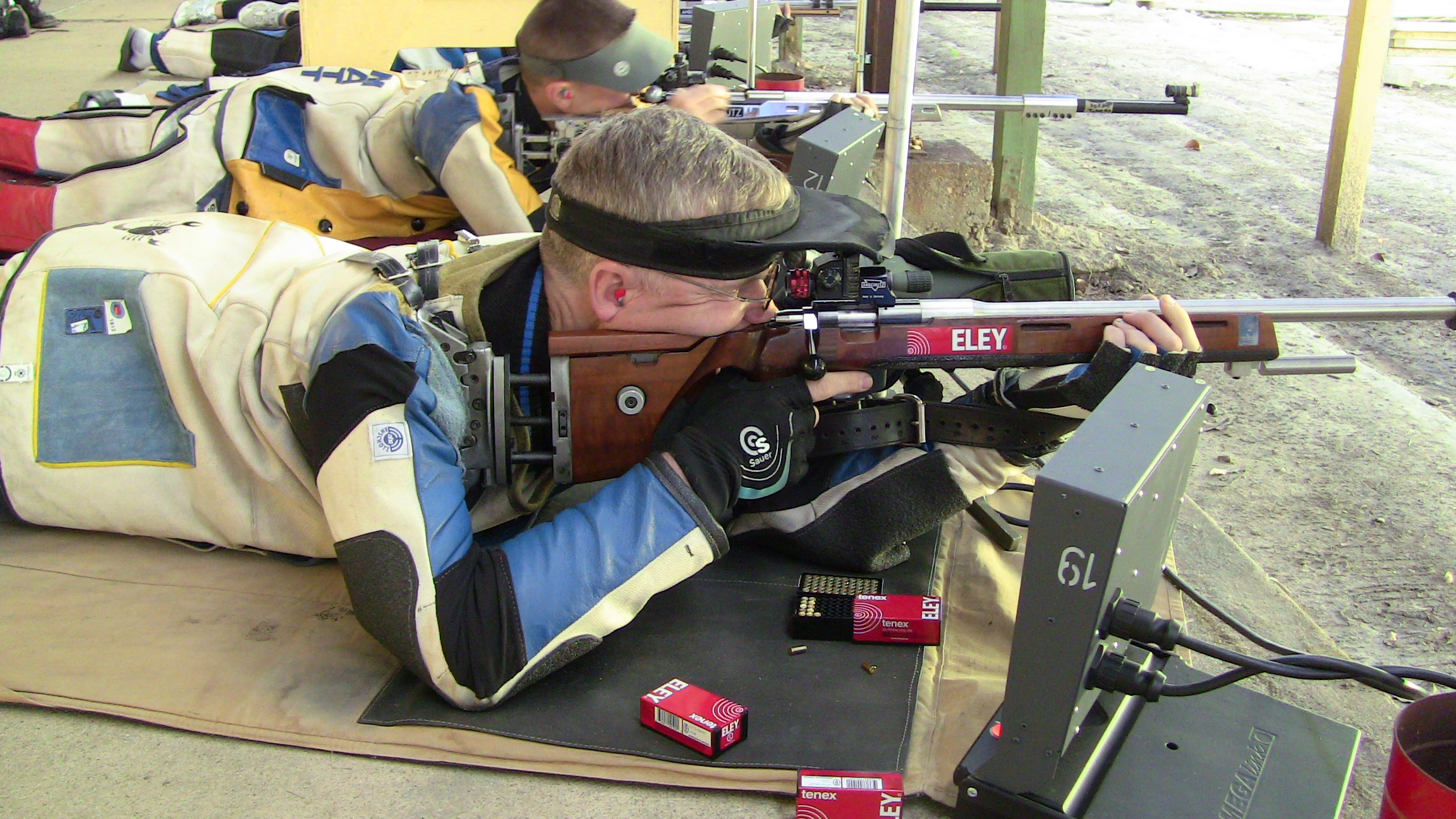
- Uptagrafft in 2012

Personal information
- Born: 16 February 1966 (age 60) Spokane, Washington
- Education: University of West Virginia
- Height: 1.8 m (5 ft 11 in)
- Weight: 90 kg (198 lb)

Sport
- Country: United States of America
- Sport: Shooting
- Events: 50 metre rifle three positions; 50 metre rifle prone; 300 metre rifle three positions; 300 metre rifle prone
Medal record
Men's shooting
Representing Great Britain
World Championships
Silver medal – second place	2002 Lahti	300m Rifle 3 Positions
World Cup Final
Gold medal – first place	2005 Munich	50m Rifle Prone
Silver medal – second place	2011 Wroclaw	50m Rifle Prone
Bronze medal – third place	2003 Milan	50m Rifle Prone
World Cup

Eric Allan Uptagrafft (born February 16, 1966) is an American sport shooter.

He was born in Spokane, Washington, and lives in Firestone, Colorado. He competed for the United States in the 1996 Summer Olympics, in the Men's Small-Bore Rifle, Prone, 50, coming in tied for 30th. At the 2012 Summer Olympics, he finished in 16th in the same event. He shares the integer-scored world record in the 50 meter rifle prone competition. In 2013, the prone event moved to a decimal scoring system.

== World record in 50 m rifle prone ==
Integer-scored world records held in 50 m Rifle Prone
Men	Qualification	600	Viatcheslav Botchkarev (URS); Stevan Pletikosić (YUG); Jean-Pierre Amat (FRA); Christian Klees (GER); Sergei Martynov (BLR); Thomas Tamas (USA); Sergei Martynov (BLR); Sergei Martynov (BLR); Petr Litvinchuk (BLR); Wolfram Waibel Jr. (AUT); Wolfram Waibel Jr. (AUT); Christian Lusch (GER); Eric Uptagrafft (USA); Valérian Sauveplane (FRA); Sergei Martynov (BLR); Sergei Martynov (BLR); Matthew Emmons (USA); Guy Starik (ISR); Sergei Martynov (BLR)	13 July 1989; 29 August 1991; 27 April 1994; 25 July 1996; 23 May 1997; 28 July 1998; 4 September 1998; 8 June 2000; 11 June 2003; 18 July 2003; 3 March 2004; 27 October 2004; 11 May 2005; 11 May 2005; 26 August 2005; 29 March 2006; 9 May 2007; 18 May 2008; 3 August 2012	Zagreb (YUG); Munich (GER); Havana (CUB); Atlanta (USA); Munich (GER); Barcelona (ESP); Buenos Aires (ARG); Munich (GER); Munich (GER); Plzeň (CZE); Sydney (AUS); Bangkok (THA); Fort Benning (USA); Fort Benning (USA); Munich (GER); Guangzhou (CHN); Bangkok (THA); Munich (GER); London (ENG)
