= Jorge González (sport shooter) =

Spanish sport shooter

Jorge González (born 2 May 1957) is a Spanish former sport shooter who competed in the 1984 Summer Olympics, in the 1988 Summer Olympics, in the 1992 Summer Olympics, in the 1996 Summer Olympics, and in the 2000 Summer Olympics.
