= Shooting at the 1992 Summer Olympics – Men's 50 metre rifle prone =

Sports shooting at the Olympics

Men's 50 metre rifle prone at the Games of the XXV Olympiad
- Venue: Mollet del Vallès
- Competitors: 52 from 34 nations
- Winning score: 702.5 OR

Medalists
1st place, gold medalist(s)		Lee Eun-chul	South Korea
2nd place, silver medalist(s)		Harald Stenvaag	Norway
3rd place, bronze medalist(s)		Stevan Pletikosić	Independent Olympic Participants

Men's 50 metre rifle prone (then known as small-bore free rifle) was one of the thirteen shooting events at the 1992 Summer Olympics. It was the first Olympic competition after the introduction of the new target in 1989, and thus two Olympic records were set. The first was set by Hubert Bichler with 598 points in the qualification round. All his seven adversaries in the final started just one point behind him on 597. Two of them, Lee Eun-chul and Harald Stenvaag, surpassed him to win gold and silver respectively, with Lee establishing a new final Olympic record. Stevan Pletikosić finished on exactly the same score as Bichler, and the rules at the time broke the tie by best final score, giving Pletikosić the bronze medal.

== Qualification round ==
Rank	Athlete	Country	Score	Notes
1	Hubert Bichler	Germany	598	Q OR
2	Harald Stenvaag	Norway	597	Q
3	Stevan Pletikosić	Independent Olympic Participants	597	Q
4	Juha Hirvi	Finland	597	Q
5	Peter Gabrielsson	Sweden	597	Q
6	Michel Bury	France	597	Q
7	Hrachya Petikyan	Unified Team	597	Q
8	Lee Eun-chul	South Korea	597	Q
9	William E. Meek	United States	596	
10	Bernd Rücker	Germany	596	
11	Jens Harskov Loczi	Denmark	596	
11	Jiang Rong	China	596	
11	Olimpiu Marin	Romania	596	
11	Wolfram Waibel Jr.	Austria	596	
15	Michael James Ashcroft	Canada	595	
15	Nils Petter Håkedal	Norway	595	
15	Zsolt Vári	Hungary	595	
18	Michael Anti	United States	594	
18	Cha Young-chul	South Korea	594	
18	Tadeusz Czerwiński	Poland	594	
18	Rajmond Debevec	Slovenia	594	
18	Ralph Rodríguez	Puerto Rico	594	
18	Andreas Zumbach	Switzerland	594	
24	Michel Dion	Canada	593	
24	Kirill Ivanov	Unified Team	593	
26	Jean-Pierre Amat	France	592	
26	Jorge González	Spain	592	
26	Akihiro Mera	Japan	592	
26	Jari Pälve	Finland	592	
26	Attila Záhonyi	Hungary	592	
31	Milan Bakeš	Czechoslovakia	591	
31	Bo Arne Gerhard Lilja	Denmark	591	
31	Goran Maksimović	Independent Olympic Participants	591	
31	Bruce Meredith	Virgin Islands	591	
31	Ricardo Rusticucci	Argentina	591	
31	Miroslav Varga	Czechoslovakia	591	
31	Wolfram Waibel Sr.	Austria	591	
31	Petar Dimitrov Zapryanov	Bulgaria	591	
39	Massimo Birindelli	Italy	590	
39	Menachem Ilan	Israel	590	
39	Pang Yongying	China	590	
42	Stephen Kelly Petterson	New Zealand	589	
43	Khalaf Al-Khatri	Oman	588	
43	Alister Miller Allan	Great Britain	588	
43	Manfred Fiess	South Africa	588	
43	Ryohei Koba	Japan	588	
43	Jacek Kubka	Poland	588	
48	Jaime Parés	Spain	587	
49	Hugo Romero	Ecuador	585	
50	Carl Eiríksson	Iceland	583	
50	Norbert Sturny	Switzerland	583	
52	Satiender Sehmi	Kenya	579	

OR Olympic record – Q Qualified for final

== Final ==
Rank	Athlete	Qual	Final	Total	Shoot-off	Notes
1st place, gold medalist(s)	Lee Eun-chul (KOR)	597	105.5	702.5		OR
2nd place, silver medalist(s)	Harald Stenvaag (NOR)	597	104.4	701.4		
3rd place, bronze medalist(s)	Stevan Pletikosić (IOP)	597	104.1	701.1		
4	Hubert Bichler (GER)	598	103.1	701.1		
5	Michel Bury (FRA)	597	103.0	700.0		
6	Juha Hirvi (FIN)	597	102.5	699.5	?	
7	Peter Gabrielsson (SWE)	597	102.5	699.5	?	
8	Hrachya Petikyan (EUN)	597	102.2	699.2		

OR Olympic record

== Sources ==
- Games of the XXV Olympiad Barcelona 1992: The results (PDF).
