= Pang Yongying =

Chinese sport shooter

Pang Yongying (simplified Chinese: 庞永英; traditional Chinese: 龐永英; born 6 June 1964) is a Chinese sport shooter who competed in the 1992 Summer Olympics.

== Career ==
Pang is from Foshan, a city in Guangdong. He began his studies at Foshan No.1 High School in 1976. A coach from Foshan Sports School visited, seeking to find students who would train in sports shooting. Alongside over 30 fellow students, Pang registered his interest. He underwent multiple physical tests and along with just one other student, he was chosen to continue training. In late 1976, he began training in sports shooting at Foshan Sports School. In the following year, he won two first-place finishes and one second-place finish in regional competitions. In 1980, he competed in a Guangdong Province shooting contest and placed first in the amateur category. His performance drew the attention of the provincial team coaches and in October 1980, he became a member of the provincial team. At the 1987 National Games of China, Pang received first place in the 40 shots in prone event, scoring a perfect 400 points which tied the world record. Later that year, Pang placed first in a shooting competition among Guangdong, Hong Kong, and Macau athletes. In the 1980s, Pang received numerous gold and silver medals in national competitions.

Pang qualified for two events at the 1992 Summer Olympics in Barcelona: men's 50 metre rifle prone and men's 50 metre rifle three positions. Since he thought his standing shot wasn't that competitive, he gave his spot in the latter event to his teammate, Jiang Rong. Pang failed to make the finals in the event he competed in. He said that he participated in Olympic Village exchange events including a bowling contest where his shooting team placed third. Finishing his stint at the Olympics, Pang became the sports shooting coach at Foshan Sports School. After two years there, he moved to the sports school's logistics department. The last national competition he took part in was the 1994 ISSF World Shooting Championships in Italy. Although he felt confident, he did not compete in the event.

== Personal life ==
Pang's wife is a sports shooter whom he met when they were on the provincial team. They married and had a son.
