= Birindelli =

Birindelli is an Italian surname. Notable people with the surname include:

- Alessandro Birindelli (born 1974), Italian footballer and manager
- Gino Birindelli (1911–2008), Italian admiral
- Massimo Birindelli (born 1956), Italian sports shooter
- Samuele Birindelli (born 1999), Italian footballer
