= Alton Chung Ming Chan =

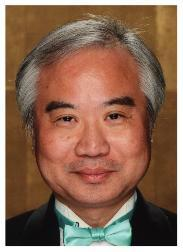
Alton Chung Ming Chan

Alton Chung Ming Chan (陳忠明) is a Chinese-American-Canadian pianist, pedagogue, choral and orchestral conductor, author, editor, recording artist, video director and producer.

== Biography ==
Alton Chung Ming Chan, a Grammy Award nominee, was born in Hong Kong. After early piano studies with Elsie Tjiok-Lim (石聖芳) and graduation from Cheung Sha Wan Catholic Secondary School in Hong Kong, Chan received much of his higher musical training in the United States where he earned his bachelor's degree under Anita Windecker from Texas Lutheran University. Later, he earned his master's degree in piano performance under Joseph Banowetz and a PhD in music education, both from the University of North Texas College of Music.

In 1983, Chan made his orchestral debut in Beijing over Chinese National Television and Radio with the People's Republic of China's Central Opera Orchestra (中央歌劇交響樂團). Since then, he has appeared as soloist and recitalist in concert halls in Asia, Russia, Europe and North America. He is also a Mason and Hamlin Artist . In 1991, Chan received The Young Outstanding Graduate Award from Texas Lutheran University for his achievements in the performing arts.

As a scholar and expert on American piano pedagogy, Chan has appeared as a guest lecturer and performer at the Sichuan Conservatory of Music in Chengdu, Xinghai Conservatory of Music in Guangzhou, Central Conservatory of Music in Beijing, Shenyang Conservatory of Music, Lang Lang Music World (朗朗音樂世界) in Shenzhen, Hong Kong Baptist University, The Hong Kong Academy for Performing Arts, Chetham International Summer School and Festival for Pianists at Chetham's School of Music in Manchester, England, Nanyang Academy of Fine Arts in Singapore, and at numerous piano music teacher associations, festivals and conferences in the United States and Europe.

In 2002, he was invited to be the keynote speaker for the annual conference of the Czech Republic's Chapter of the European Piano Teachers Association. In addition to giving lectures and master classes, as well as premiering the piano transcription of the Adagio of Mahler's Tenth Symphony by the Scottish composer Ronald Stevenson at Mahler's birthplace in Jihlava , he also performed and lectured in various cities in the Czech Republic and Portugal during the summer of 2002.

Currently, Chan serves as the Director of Music Learning Unlimited, a private community music school in the Dallas Metroplex. He is also the artistic director of the Dallas Chinese Children's Choir, and has served three years as the musical director for the Dallas Asian American Youth Orchestra .

== Publications and Editions ==
Chan's music reviews, articles, and research on piano pedagogy have been published in numerous American, British, Canadian and Hong Kong educational journals and newspapers. His recent publications for Warner Brothers Publications include a three-volume set of four-hand piano music with accompanying tutorial compact discs by Leopold Godowsky entitled Miniatures, and two volumes of Chinese piano music by the Chinese-Canadian composer An-lun Huang (黃安倫). Recently, he directed and produced a 2-DVD set on piano pedaling as lectured and demonstrated by Joseph Banowetz for Shanghai Education Publishing House (上海教育出版社) . In addition, the complete collection of Reinhold Glieré's solo piano music will be published by Cambria Music in the near future.

== Recordings ==
As a recording artist, Chan has made commercial compact discs for Marco Polo, a subsidiary label of Naxos Records, one of the largest recording companies in the world, and Warner Brothers as well as Toccata Classics. In the 50th Grammy Awards Ceremony, his and Joseph Banowetz's four-hand piano recording of Balakirev's 30 Songs of the Russian People was nominated for the Best Chamber Music Award.

A recording of Carl Czerny's Piano Concerto in C Major, Op.153 for four-hands and other piano pieces for six-hands, and the complete piano solo works of Reinhold Glieré, are released in 2018 by Naxos Records and Cambria Music respectively.
