= Zsolt Vári =

Hungarian sports shooter

Zsolt Vári (born January 14, 1969, in Budapest) is a Hungarian sport shooter. He competed in rifle shooting events at the Summer Olympics in 1992 and 1996.

== Olympic results ==
Event	1992	1996
50 metre rifle three positions (men)	8th	27th
50 metre rifle prone (men)	T-15th	T-11th
10 metre air rifle (men)	—	T-33rd
