= Kinky Friedman =

American singer-songwriter, writer and politician (1944–2024)

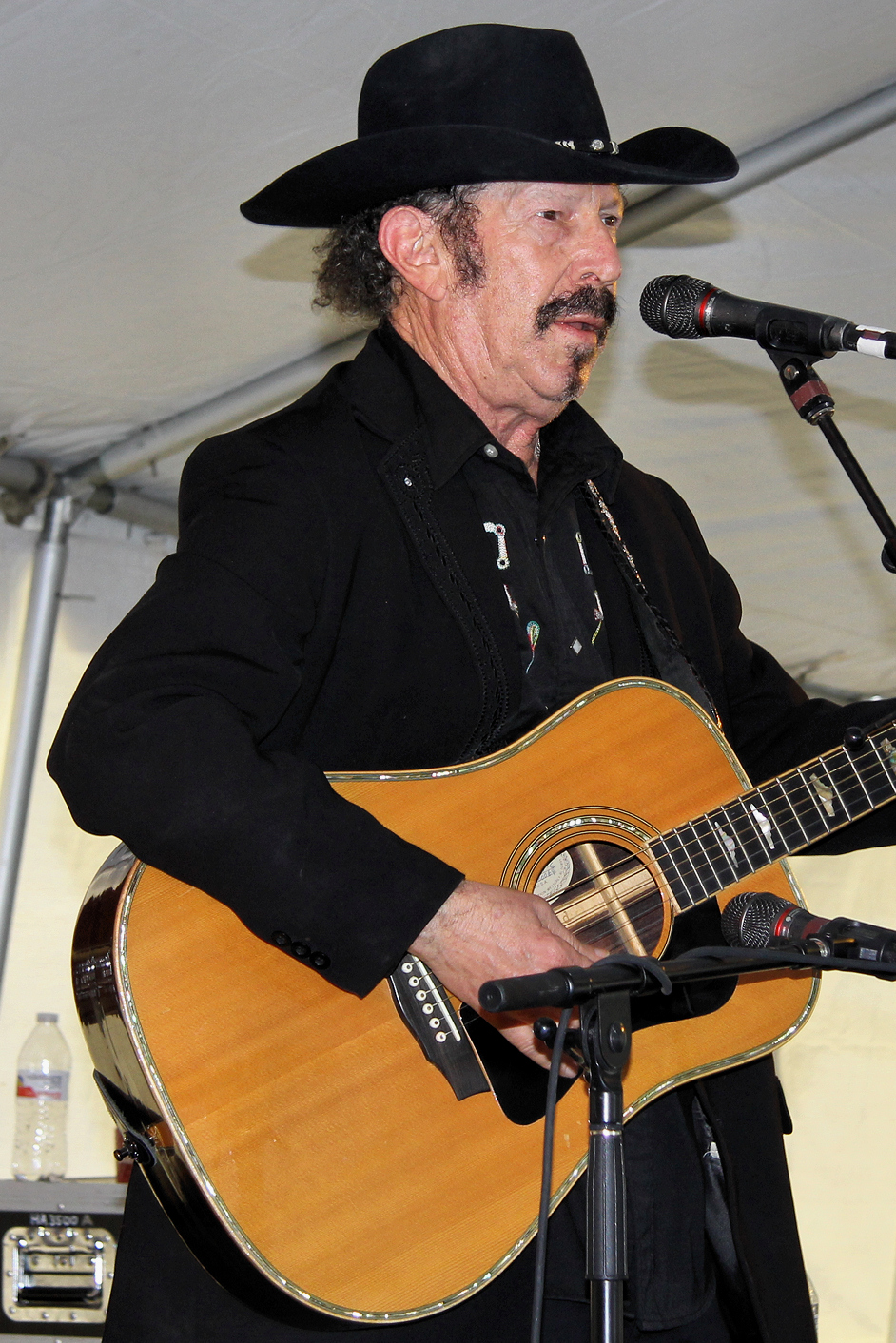
- Friedman performing at the 2013 Texas Book Festival

Personal details
- Born: Richard Samet Friedman; November 1, 1944 Chicago, Illinois, U.S.
- Died: June 27, 2024 (aged 79) (Note: Some sources reported that Friedman died early on June 27, while others said he died late on June 26. Others did not report a date of death.) Medina, Texas, U.S.
- Party: Democratic (2009–2024)
- Other political affiliations: Independent (2004–2009); Republican (before 2004)
- Education: University of Texas, Austin (BA)
- Musical career
- Genres: Country; progressive country; country rock; outlaw country
- Instruments: Vocals, guitar
- Years active: 1964–2018
- Website: kinkyfriedman.com

Richard Samet "Kinky" Friedman (November 1, 1944 – June 27, 2024) was an American singer, songwriter, novelist, humorist, politician, and columnist for Texas Monthly, who styled himself in the mold of popular American satirists Will Rogers and Mark Twain.

Friedman was one of two independent candidates in the 2006 Texas gubernatorial election. Receiving 12.6% of the vote, Friedman placed fourth in the six-person race.

== Biography ==
Richard Samet Friedman was born in Chicago on November 1, 1944, to Jewish parents, Dr. S. Thomas Friedman and his wife Minnie (Samet) Friedman. Both of his parents were the children of Russian Jewish immigrants. When Friedman was young, his family moved to the Texas Hill Country where they opened a summer camp called Echo Hill Ranch.

Friedman had an early interest in both pop music and chess, and was chosen at age seven as one of 50 local players to challenge U.S. grandmaster Samuel Reshevsky to simultaneous games in Houston. Reshevsky won all 50 games, but Friedman was, by far, the youngest competitor.

Friedman graduated from Austin High School in Austin, Texas, in 1962. He subsequently earned a Bachelor of Arts from the University of Texas at Austin in 1966, majoring in psychology. He took part in the Plan II Honors program and was a member of the Tau Delta Phi fraternity. During his first year, Chinga Chavin gave Friedman the nickname "Kinky" because of his curly hair.

Friedman served two years in the United States Peace Corps, teaching in Borneo, Malaysia with John Gross. During his service in the Peace Corps, he met future road manager Dylan Ferrero, with whom he worked for the remainder of his life. Friedman lived at Echo Hill Ranch, his family's summer camp near Kerrville, Texas. He founded Utopia Animal Rescue Ranch, also located near Kerrville, whose mission is to care for stray, abused and aging animals; to date, the ranch has saved more than 1,000 dogs from animal euthanasia.

On June 27, 2024, it was announced that Friedman had died at his home at Echo Hill Ranch, Medina, Bandera County, Texas, from complications of Parkinson's disease. He was 79.

== Music career ==
Friedman formed his first band, King Arthur & the Carrots, while a student at the University of Texas at Austin. The band, which poked fun at surf music, recorded only one single in 1966 ("Schwinn 24/Beach Party Boo Boo").

By 1973, Friedman had formed his second band, Kinky Friedman and The Texas Jewboys, which many took to be a play on the name of the famous band Bob Wills and His Texas Playboys. In keeping with the band's satirical nature, each member had a comical name: in addition to Kinky there were Little Jewford, Big Nig, Panama Red, Wichita Culpepper, Sky Cap Adams, Rainbow Colours, and Snakebite Jacobs. More conventionally named roadie Jack Slaughter and road manager Dylan Ferrero rounded out the crew and provided most of the driving of the "tour bus", a Cadillac with 10-year-old expired license plates and a propensity to break down (but, according to Friedman, her talent lay in her ability to stop on a dime and pick up the change).

Friedman's father objected to the name of the band, calling it a "negative, hostile, peculiar thing", which gave Kinky even more reason to choose the name.

Arriving on the wave of country rock following on from Gram Parsons, The Band, and Eagles, Friedman originally found cult fame as a country and western singer. His break came in 1973 thanks to Commander Cody of Commander Cody and His Lost Planet Airmen, who contacted Vanguard Music on his behalf. Friedman released Kinky Friedman in 1974 for ABC Records, then toured with Bob Dylan in 1975–1976. His repertoire mixed social commentary ("We Reserve the Right to Refuse Service to You") and maudlin ballads ("Western Union Wire") with raucous humor (such as "Get Your Biscuits in the Oven and Your Buns in the Bed"). His "Ride 'Em Jewboy" was an extended tribute to the victims of the Holocaust.

One of his most famous songs is "They Ain't Makin' Jews Like Jesus Anymore," a song in which Kinky verbally and physically beats up a drunken white racist who berates blacks, Jews, Italians, Greeks, Irish people, and Sigma Nus in a bar, with lyrics such as,

Oh, they ain't makin' Jews like Jesus anymore,
They ain't makin' carpenters that know what nails are for

Other Friedman tunes include "The Ballad of Charles Whitman," in which Friedman lampooned Charles Whitman's sniper attack from the University of Texas at Austin's Main Building tower on August 1, 1966. He also covered Chinga Chavin's "Asshole from El Paso", a parody of Merle Haggard's "Okie from Muskogee".

One of Friedman's most infamous concerts was a 1973 performance in Buffalo, New York; upon performing "Get Your Biscuits in the Oven and Your Buns in the Bed" (a song that lampoons feminism), a group of what Friedman described as "cranked-up lesbians" entered into a fight with the band and forced the concert to end early while Friedman and the band were escorted off stage. The National Organization for Women awarded Friedman the "Male Chauvinist Pig Award" later that year, an award Friedman took with pride. Friedman would not return to Buffalo until 2012. Another was at The Boarding House in early-March 1975 when an offended Buffy Sainte-Marie rushed on stage and snatched the war bonnet that Friedman was wearing while he and his band were performing "Miss Nickelodeon," a composition that spoofs the indigenous peoples of the Americas.

Friedman and his band taped an Austin City Limits show on November 11, 1975, which was never aired. According to the show's executive producer, Terry Lickona, this is the first and only time in the show's long history that an episode went unaired. Lickona told the Austin Chronicle "I've seen it many times – it's a very popular party tape among friends. I think it was a great show, and it might be as offensive today as it was back then."

In early 1976, he joined Bob Dylan on the second leg of the Rolling Thunder Revue tour.

Friedman was the musical guest on the Season 2 fifth episode of Saturday Night Live which aired on October 23, 1976. He performed his own composition "Dear Abbie".

Although hard to verify, given the number of Jewish-origin entertainers in country/hillbilly-tour circles (e.g. Gilbert Maxwell "Broncho Billy" Anderson), Friedman claims to have been the first full-blooded Jew to take the stage at the Grand Ole Opry.

In February 2007, Sustain Records released a compilation of the songs of Kinky Friedman sung by other artists called Why the Hell Not ... The compilation includes contributions by Dwight Yoakam, Willie Nelson, Lyle Lovett, and Kelly Willis.

On July 20, 2007, Friedman hosted the Concert to Save Town Lake to honor the memory of Lady Bird Johnson and her efforts to protect and preserve the shores of Town Lake in Austin, Texas.

On April 27, 2011, Friedman launched his Springtime for Kinky Tour (cf. "Springtime for Hitler") in Kansas City, Missouri, at Knuckleheads Saloon; it included dates in Arkansas, Oklahoma, and Kentucky before heading towards the East Coast. This was followed by a tour of Australia with Van Dyke Parks.

In the summer of 2014, Friedman recalled the story of how he discovered Nelson Mandela became a fan of his music. While Friedman was touring South Africa in the late 80s, on a book tour, Friedman met a man named Dali Tombo who was the son of a mentor of Nelson Mandela. Tombo told Friedman that Nelson Mandela would obsessively play Friedman's album Sold American while in prison, and had a particular affinity for the song Ride 'em Jewboy.

== Writing career ==
After his music career stalled in the 1980s, Friedman shifted his creative focus to writing detective novels. His books have similarities to his song lyrics, featuring a fictionalized version of himself solving crimes in New York City and dispensing jokes, wisdom, recipes, charm, and Jameson's whiskey in equal measure. They are written in a straightforward style which owes a debt to Raymond Chandler. The Kinky character views himself as a latter-day Sherlock Holmes and he is aided in his investigations by his close friend Larry Sloman aka Ratso who assumes the role of Dr. Watson.

He authored two novels that do not star the Kinky Friedman character: Kill Two Birds and Get Stoned and The Christmas Pig.

Friedman also wrote a regular column for the magazine Texas Monthly from April 2001 to March 2005 which was suspended during his run for governor of Texas. In 2008, Texas Monthly brought his column back on a bimonthly basis.

Two books have been published collecting some of these nonfiction writings, as well as previously unpublished ones: Scuse Me While I Whip This Out and Texas Hold'em. He has also published a travelog (The Great Psychedelic Armadillo Picnic) and an etiquette guide.

Friedman's early books have been republished by Friedman's own Vandam Press as ebooks. During March and April 2011, Vandam released seven of Friedman's early titles including: Greenwich Killing Time, A Case of Lone Star, Musical Chairs, When The Cat's Away, Frequent Flyer, Roadkill and the rarely seen Curse of the Missing Puppet Head. Elvis Jesus and Coca-Cola, God Bless John Wayne, Blast From The Past, Armadillos and Old Lace, and two nonfiction books, Drinker With A Writing Problem and Heroes of A Texas Childhood were released in 2011. E-book releases are announced on Friedman's X (Twitter) feed and Facebook page, "TheRealKinkster".

Friedman also announced (via Jim Bessman's column at examiner.com) the upcoming release of all Vandam Press titles as unabridged audio books "read by the author".

The recurring character "Rambam", a New York private investigator and friend of the Friedman character in the books, is based on the real-life investigator Steven Rambam, who acted as a technical advisor for the real Friedman. Old Peace Corps friend and long time road manager Dylan Ferrero is also a recurring character in Kinky's mystery novels; his character is known for only speaking in rock and roll quotes, a trait taken from real life.

== Personal life and habits ==
Friedman frequently referred to himself in the third person.

== Politics ==
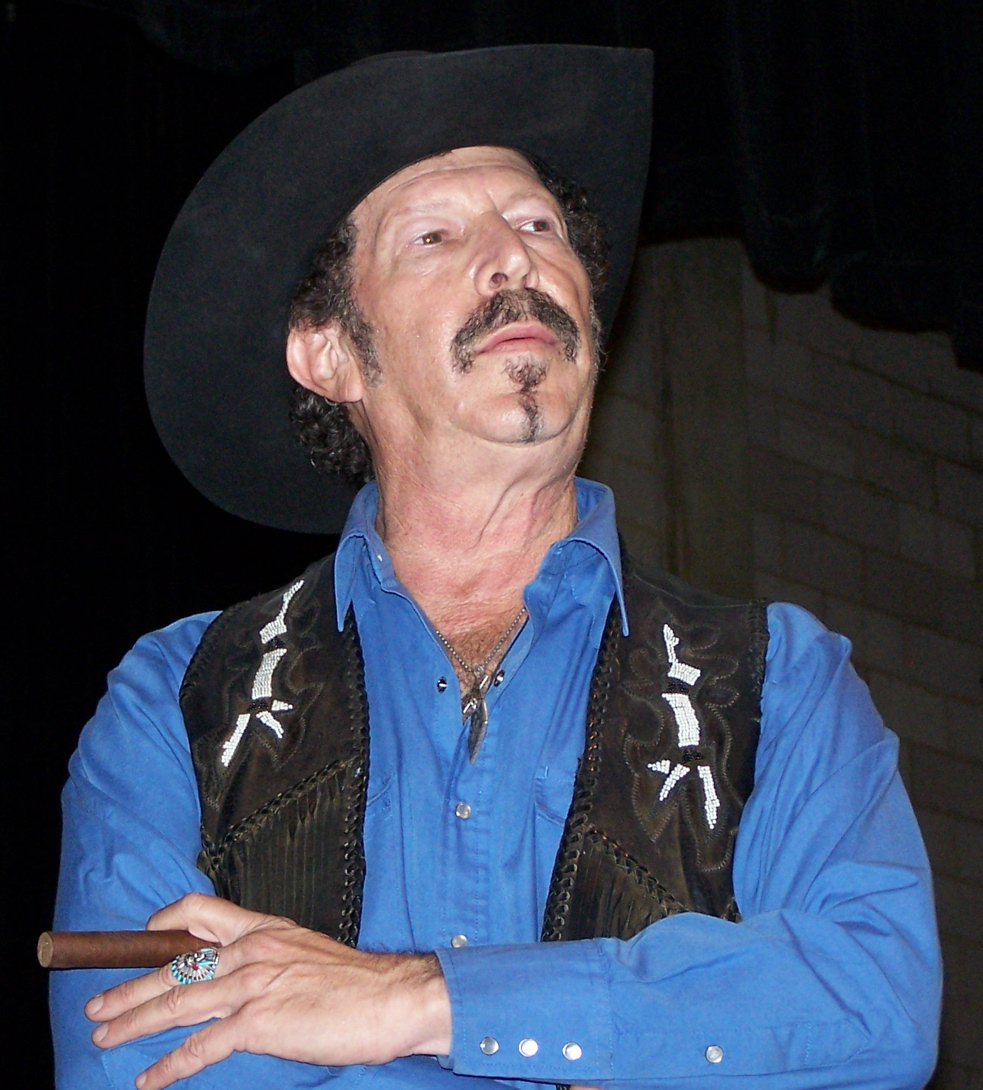
Friedman contemplates a question from the audience at a campaign rally in Bastrop during the 2006 Texas gubernatorial campaign.

Kinky's performance by county in 2006: Friedman: 0–5%; 5–10%; 10–15%; 15–20%; 20–25%; 25–30%

In 1986, Friedman ran for justice of the peace in Kerrville, Texas, as a Republican but lost the election.

In 2004, Friedman began an ostensibly serious, though colorful, campaign to become the governor of Texas in 2006. One of his stated goals is the "dewussification" of Texas. Among his campaign slogans were "How Hard Could It Be?", "Why The Hell Not?", "My Governor is a Jewish Cowboy", and "He ain't Kinky, he's my Governor" (cf. "He Ain't Heavy, He's My Brother").

Friedman had hoped to follow in the footsteps of other entertainers-turned-governors, including Jimmie Davis, Jesse Ventura, Arnold Schwarzenegger, and Ronald Reagan. Jesse Ventura even campaigned with Friedman for his election. When the campaign finance reports came out after the second quarter had ended, Friedman had raised more funds than the Democratic nominee, former Congressman Chris Bell.

On election day, Friedman was defeated, receiving 12.6% of the votes in the six-candidate matchup.

Friedman released a statement on October 15, 2013, announcing his intent to again run for Texas agriculture commissioner as a Democrat. Friedman previously ran for the post in 2010, losing in the Democratic primary.

=== Issues and positions ===
Friedman supported the full legalization and cultivation of hemp and marijuana, declaring that the end of the prohibition is a health, education funding, prison reduction, border security, and state's rights issue.

On education, he supported higher pay for teachers and working to lower Texas's dropout rate. He supported more investment in harnessing Texas's alternative fuel resources such as wind and biodiesel. Friedman was opposed to the Trans-Texas Corridor since it relies on toll road construction.

Friedman supported capital punishment reform. He previously summed up his position, "I am not anti-death penalty, but I'm damn sure anti-the-wrong-guy-getting-executed." He later clarified his position: "The system is not perfect. Until it's perfect, let's do away with the death penalty."

On illegal immigration, Friedman wanted to increase the number of Texas National Guard troops on the border (from the current 1,500 to 10,000), impose $25,000 and $50,000 fines on companies that hire illegal immigrants, and require foreign nationals seeking employment to purchase a foreign taxpayer ID card once they have passed a criminal background check. "Texas can no longer wait for our federal government to solve our illegal immigration problem," Friedman said. "These are steps that Texas can immediately take to help stem the tide of illegal immigrants penetrating our border." Had he been elected, he had promised to meet regularly with Governor Bill Richardson of New Mexico and Governor Janet Napolitano of Arizona to develop a coordinated border state plan to supplement federal efforts to curb illegal immigration. Previously, Kinky put forth the "Five Mexican Generals" Plan, to pay Mexican officials to halt immigration on their side of the border. Although he originally stated "When I talk about the five Mexican generals, people think I'm joking but I'm dead serious", Friedman later told the Dallas Morning News that the plan, never meant to be carried out, was a joke with an element of seriousness.

According to his official website, Friedman's answer to the question "How does Kinky feel about abortion?" was "Kinky believes in a woman's right to choose." In person, he hedged his bets, saying "I'm not pro-life, and I'm not pro-choice. I'm pro-football." On social issues, he supported gay marriage, answering an Associated Press reporter's question on the subject on February 3, 2005, by saying, "I support gay marriage. I believe they have a right to be as miserable as the rest of us." (Friedman himself never married.)

According to Cigar Aficionado magazine, Friedman planned to roll back "any and all smoking bans" if elected. One of his favorite quotes came from Mark Twain: "If smoking is not allowed in heaven, I shall not go." Friedman supported the decriminalization of marijuana, though he did not advocate making its sale legal. "I'm not talking about like Amsterdam," he noted, "We've got to clear some of the room out of the prisons so we can put the bad guys in there, like the pedophiles and the politicians."

=== Further political activities ===
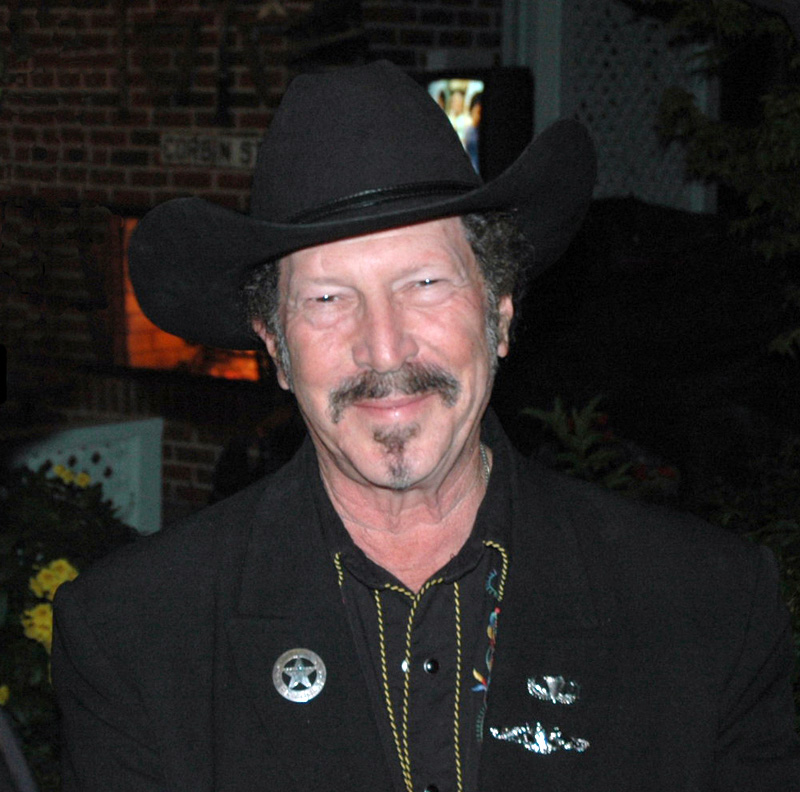
Friedman in 2006

On August 9, 2007, the Austin American-Statesman reported that Friedman was considering another run for governor of Texas in 2010. "I'm open to running", Friedman said, adding that he would not make a final decision until after the 2008 elections. On February 10, 2009, Friedman confirmed to the Associated Press that he was still interested in running.

In an August 23, 2007 interview with the Fort Worth Star-Telegram and a February 10, 2009 interview with the Associated Press, Friedman stated that if he did run in 2010, he would run as a Democrat, citing that "God probably couldn't have won as an independent" and that he was a Democrat all his life.

On April 14, 2009, Friedman announced in an email to supporters that he intended to make a second gubernatorial run, this time as a Democrat. Friedman then announced on December 14, 2009, that he was leaving the gubernatorial race and would instead seek the party nomination in March 2010 for Texas Agriculture Commissioner. He lost the nomination to rancher Hank Gilbert in the primary held on March 2, 2010.

== Other work and references in popular culture ==
Friedman appeared in the 2004 documentary film Barbecue: A Texas Love Story by Austin-based director Chris Elley. In the film, narrated by Governor Ann Richards, Kinky exclaims that "Jesus loved Barbecue" and analyzes the speech patterns of Texans versus New Yorkers. Raw footage from Friedman's interview appears in the 2005 DVD release of the film.

Friedman's first movie appearance was in Record City (1977). He appeared in other movies as well, including Loose Shoes (1978) (also known as Coming Attractions and Quackers) and The Texas Chainsaw Massacre 2 (1986).

Friedman's persona as a politically incorrect raconteur has been likened to that of movie critic and commentator John Irving Bloom, better known in print as Joe Bob Briggs, with whom he appeared in the B movie The Texas Chainsaw Massacre 2.

Friedman preferred to smoke Montecristo No. 2 Cigars, the same brand once smoked by Fidel Castro. However, he also smoked Bolivars, noting that "Simón Bolívar is the only person in history to be exiled from a country named after him." Friedman later made eponymous cigars under the name Kinky Friedman Cigars.

Friedman was given brief praise in Joseph Heller's 1976 novel, Good as Gold, in which a governor (meant to satirize Lyndon B. Johnson), tells the main character, Bruce Gold: "Gold, I like you. You remind me a lot of this famous country singer from Texas I'm crazy about, a fellow calls himself Kinky Friedman, the Original Texas Jewboy. Kinky's smarter, but I like you more."

Friedman was friends with Bill Clinton and George W. Bush, and he visited both at the White House. He wrote about his friendships with them in his November 2001 column ("Hail to the Kinkster") for Texas Monthly.

The play Becoming Kinky: The World According to Kinky Friedman, directed by Ted Swindley (Always...Patsy Cline), starring Jesse Dayton, Little Jewford, Alan Lee, and Andross Bautsch, premiered in Houston, Texas on March 28, 2011.

Friedman was responsible for the quote "you've got to find what you love and let it kill you," which is often falsely attributed to the poet and novelist Charles Bukowski.

Friedman hosted the live concert music television show "Texas Roadhouse Live" around 2011, which would air on over-the-air network television late Saturday night (or midnight Sunday morning) in some Texas markets.

On the 2017 album entitled Out of All This Blue, Mike Scott of The Waterboys composed a song called "Kinky's History Lesson" where the singer attempts to correct Friedman on a number of false statements he has allegedly made.

== Discography ==
=== Albums ===
Year	Album	Artist	Label	US Chart
1973	Sold American	Kinky Friedman	Vanguard	—
1974	Kinky Friedman	Kinky Friedman	ABC	132
1976	Lasso from El Paso	Kinky Friedman	Epic	—
1977	Silver Jubilee 1953–1977	Echo Hill Ranch	Echo Hill Ranch	—
1982	Live from the Lone Star Cafe	Kinky Friedman	Bruno-Dean	—
1983	Under the Double Ego	Kinky Friedman	Sunrise	—
1992	Old Testaments & New Revelations	Kinky Friedman and the Texas Jewboys	Fruit of the Tune	—
1995	From One Good American to Another	Kinky Friedman and the Texas Jewboys	Fruit of the Tune	—
1998	Pearls in the Snow – The Songs of Kinky Friedman	Kinky Friedman	Kinkajou Records	—
2003	Classic Snatches from Europe	Kinky Friedman	Sphincter	—
2005	Mayhem Aforethought	Kinky Friedman and the Texas Jewboys	Sphincter	—
2005	They Ain't Making Jews Like Jesus Anymore	Kinky Friedman	Bear Family	—
2006	The Last of the Jewish Cowboys: The Best Of	Kinky Friedman	Shout! Factory	—
2007	Live from Austin, Texas	Kinky Friedman	New West	—
2013	Lost and Found: The Famous Living Room Tape, 1970	Kinky Friedman and the Texas Jewboys	Avenue A	—
2015	The Loneliest Man I Ever Met	Kinky Friedman	Avenue A	—
2016	Resurrection	Kinky Friedman	Echo Hill	—
2018	Circus of Life	Kinky Friedman	Echo Hill	—
2025	Poet of Motel 6	Kinky Friedman	Hardcharger Records	—

=== Singles ===
Year	Single	Chart Positions		Album
Year	Single	US Country	CAN Country	Album
1973	"Sold American"	69	92	Sold American
1975	"Autograph"	—	—	Kinky Friedman
1975	"Popeye the Sailor Man"	—	—	Kinky Friedman
1976	"Catfish"	—	—	Lasso from El Paso

== Bibliography ==
=== Kinky Friedman Mysteries ===
- Greenwich Killing Time (1986, ISBN 0-688-06409-4)
- A Case Of Lone Star (1987, ISBN 0-517-69427-1)
- When The Cat's Away (1988, ISBN 0-517-07564-4)
- Frequent Flyer (1989, ISBN 0-688-08166-5)
- Musical Chairs (1991, ISBN 0-688-09148-2)
- Elvis, Jesus and Coca-Cola (1993, ISBN 0-671-86922-1)
- Armadillos and Old Lace (1994, ISBN 0-671-86923-X)
- God Bless John Wayne (1995, ISBN 0-684-81051-4)
- The Love Song of J. Edgar Hoover (1996, ISBN 0-684-80377-1)
- Roadkill (1997, ISBN 0-684-80378-X)
- Blast From The Past (1998, ISBN 0-684-80379-8)
- Spanking Watson (1999, ISBN 0-684-85061-3)
- The Mile High Club (2000, ISBN 0-684-86486-X)
- Steppin' On A Rainbow (2001, ISBN 0-684-86487-8)
- Meanwhile, Back at the Ranch (2002, ISBN 0-684-86488-6)
- Curse of the Missing Puppet Head (2003, ISBN 0-9702383-6-3)
- The Prisoner of Vandam Street (2004, ISBN 0-7432-4602-0)
- Ten Little New Yorkers (2005, ISBN 0-7432-4603-9)

=== Other novels ===
- Kill Two Birds and Get Stoned (2003, ISBN 0-06-620979-X)
- The Christmas Pig: A Fable (2006, ISBN 1-4165-3498-9)

=== Non-fiction & humor ===
- Kinky Friedman's Guide to Texas Etiquette: Or How To Get To Heaven Or Hell Without Going Through Dallas-Fort Worth (2002, ISBN 0-06-093535-9)
- Scuse Me While I Whip This Out: Reflections On Country Singers, Presidents, And Other Troublemakers (2004, ISBN 0-06-053975-5)
- The Great Psychedelic Armadillo Picnic: A "Walk" In Austin (2004, ISBN 1-4000-5070-7)
- Texas Hold 'Em: How I Was Born In A Manger, Died In The Saddle, And Came Back As A Horny Toad (2005, ISBN 0-312-33155-X)
- Cowboy Logic : The Wit And Wisdom Of Kinky Friedman (And Some Of His Friends) (2006, ISBN 978-0-312-33157-3)
- You Can Lead A Politician To Water, But You Can't Make Him Think: Ten Commandments For Texas Politics (2007, ISBN 978-1-4165-4760-0)
- What Would Kinky Do? How to Unscrew a Screwed Up World (2008, ISBN 978-0-312-33159-7)
