= Satiender Sehmi =

Kenyan sports shooter (born 1954)

Personal information
- Nationality: Kenyan
- Born: 5 April 1954 (age 72)

Sport
- Sport: Sports shooting

Satiender Sehmi (born 5 April 1954) is a Kenyan sports shooter. He competed in the men's 50 metre rifle prone event at the 1992 Summer Olympics.

Sehmi was a national champion and has been described as a "legendary" Kenyan shooter. He has a son, Gulraaj Sehmi, who narrowly missed qualifying for the 2016 Summer Olympics, and Sehmi has also served as coach of the national team.
