= Manfred Fiess =

South African sports shooter

Personal information
- Nationality: South African
- Born: 26 May 1941 (age 83)

Sport
- Sport: Sports shooting

Manfred Fiess (born 26 May 1941) is a South African sports shooter. He competed in the men's 50 metre rifle prone event at the 1992 Summer Olympics.
