= Carl Eiríksson =

Icelandic sports shooter (1929–2020)

Personal information
- Nationality: Icelandic
- Born: 29 December 1929
- Died: 12 June 2020 (aged 90)

Sport
- Sport: Sports shooting

Carl Eiríksson (29 December 1929 – 12 June 2020) was an Icelandic sports shooter. He competed in the men's 50 metre rifle prone event at the 1992 Summer Olympics.
