= Echo Hill Ranch =

Summer ranch camp in the Texas Hill Country, Texas, U.S.

Coordinates: 29.910194°N 99.294498°W

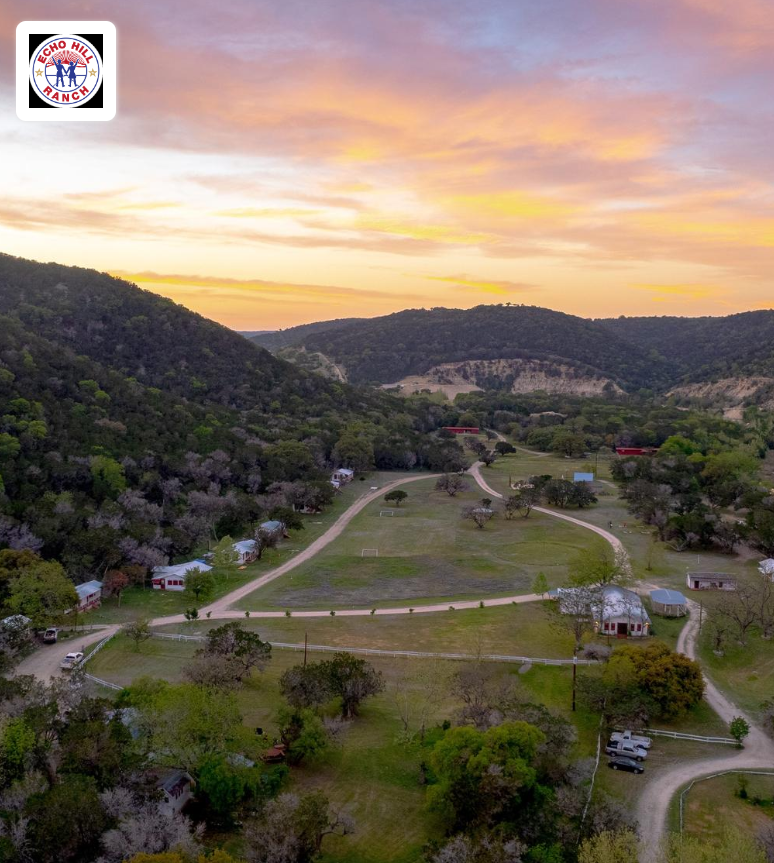
- Aerial view of Echo Hill Ranch
- Interactive map of Echo Hill Ranch
- Location: Texas Hill Country, Texas, United States
- Website: echohill.org

Echo Hill Ranch is a summer ranch camp of about 400 acres (1.6 km^{2}) in the Texas Hill Country, south of Kerrville near Medina. It operated as a private Jewish summer camp from the summer of 1953 through the summer of 2013. It reopened in 2021 with a focus on Gold Star families.

== History ==
=== 1953-2013 ===
The ranch was founded in 1953 by Dr. S. Thomas Friedman and Minnie Samet Friedman. Echo Hill was founded as a noncompetitive, child-centered ranch camp for boys and girls ages 6–14. Campers and staff were mostly from Texas though a few came from international locations. Although the majority of campers were Jewish, children of all faiths were welcome at the camp.

Minnie Friedman died in 1985 but her family and close friends, Floyd and Joan Potter, continued the tradition of running the summer camp. The Friedmans were active in the American Camping Association (ACA).

The staff taught children to swim, ride horses, play a number of different sports, enjoy arts and crafts, performing arts, camping, and things such as archery and riflery. Teens were taught leadership development and how to become staff members themselves.

At the time of Dr. Tom Friedman's death in 2002, it was decided that Roger, the middle child of the founders and resident of Maryland would become the director. Roger and his wife Roselynn (Roz) ran the camp, largely unchanged, for the next ten summers before making the decision to shut it down. On July 24, 2013 the camp announced via their Facebook page that it would not reopen for summer of 2014.

For nearly 20 years, the camp had also been home to the Utopia Animal Rescue Ranch; the program was later phased out, as the remote location of the camp made it difficult to attract adopters for rescue animals.

=== 2021-present ===
Tom and Minnie's youngest child, Marcie Friedman, is accredited by the ACA as a camp director. After working for the state department for decades, she became interested in remaking Echo Hill Ranch as a place for Gold Star families (children who have lost a parent in the military) to come to camp, tuition free, with volunteer staff and operated by generous donations given by organizations and individuals interested in supporting such families. The inaugural year of Echo Hill Ranch Gold Star Camp was planned for the summer of 2020 but was instead pushed to 2021 because of COVID-19 concerns.

During its inaugural summer in 2021, the camp hosted 62 children from 14 states. For 2022, plans were made to double the number of campers and to offer a program for the children of Afghan refugees.

Echo Hill Gold Star Camp attracts children from all over the country. Volunteers, mostly military, assist in the upkeep of the facility and the large number of responsibilities associated in running a summer camp.

== Notable people ==
Echo Hill Ranch was the residence of Texas musician, writer, and gubernatorial candidate Kinky Friedman until his death on June 26, 2024.
