= Peter Gabrielsson =

Swedish sports shooter (born 1960)

Peter Gabrielsson (born July 31, 1960 in Rosersberg) is a Swedish sport shooter. He competed in rifle shooting events at the Summer Olympics in 1992 and 1996.

== Olympic results ==
Event	1992	1996
50 metre rifle three positions (men)	7th	T-22nd
50 metre rifle prone (men)	7th	T-42nd
