= Lee Eun-chul =

South Korean sport shooter

Personal information
- Born: January 3, 1967 (age 59)
Medal record
Men's shooting
Representing South Korea
Olympic Games
Gold medal – first place	1992 Barcelona	50 m rifle prone

Lee Eun-chul (Korean: 이은철; born January 3, 1967) is a South Korean rifle shooter who was the first Korean to compete at five Olympic Games (1984 to 2000). He reached the 1992 and 1996 Olympic finals in 50 metre rifle prone, the first time advancing from 8th position to winning the gold medal. He also won two golds at the World Championships, four golds at the Asian Championships, and five golds at the Asian Games.

He turned down offers of undergraduate study at the Massachusetts Institute of Technology and West Point and chose to study computer science at Texas Lutheran University so that he would be better able to balance the demands of his sport with getting an education.

He is now a successful businessman in the high tech industry.

Olympic results
Event	1984	1988	1992	1996	2000
50 metre rifle three positions	39th 1117	28th 1161	11th 1162	18th 1163	18th 1160
50 metre rifle prone	—	—	(gold) Gold; 597+105.5	7th 596+103.1	41st 587
10 metre air rifle	—	12th 589	—	11th 590	18th 588
