= Jaime Parés =

Spanish sports shooter (born 1955)

Personal information
- Nationality: Spanish
- Born: 18 July 1955 (age 71) Barcelona, Spain

Sport
- Sport: Sports shooting

Jaime Parés (born 18 July 1955) is a Spanish sports shooter. He competed in the men's 50 metre rifle prone event at the 1992 Summer Olympics.
