= Texas Lutheran University =

Private university in Seguin, Texas, US

- Former names: Evangelical Lutheran College (1891–1912); Lutheran College of Seguin (1912–1932); Texas Lutheran College (1932–1996)
- Motto: Veritas Christi Liberat Homines
- Motto in English: The truth of Christ sets people free
- Type: Private university
- Established: 1891; 135 years ago
- Religious affiliation: Evangelical Lutheran Church in America
- Endowment: $100.2 million (2024)
- President: Debbie Cottrell
- Undergraduates: 1,400
- Location: Seguin, Texas, U.S. 29.574°N 97.986°W
- Campus: Small town/Suburban
- Colors: Black and gold
- Nickname: Bulldogs
- Sporting affiliations: Southern Collegiate Athletic Conference Division III
- Mascot: Lucky the Bulldog
- Website: www.tlu.edu

Texas Lutheran University (TLU) is a private Evangelical Lutheran university in Seguin, Texas.

== History ==
The university traces its roots back to 1891 with the foundation of an academy, named Evangelical Lutheran College, by the first German Evangelical Lutheran Synod in Texas, in Brenham. Its first president was the Reverend Gottlieb Langner. That school accumulated crushing financial problems, but in 1912, it was rescued by an offer of 15 acres and $20,000 from local businessmen to relocate the academy to Seguin. Initially, the Lutheran College of Seguin, Texas, as it was newly named, had only one building on a bare former cotton field, with 46 students.

The academy reached junior college status in 1928 with accreditation from the Texas Department of Education. The Swedish Lutheran Trinity College of Round Rock was having trouble maintaining a minimum of 40 freshmen and 20 sophomores, so in 1929, it pooled its resources with the larger Seguin institution, bringing two professors and support from Swedish Lutherans. The combined school was renamed Texas Lutheran College in 1930. It became a four-year institution in 1948. Then, Texas Lutheran absorbed Clifton College of Clifton, a Norwegian Lutheran school in 1954, again gaining faculty and support from a larger base.

When the college received recognition in 1953 as a fully accredited senior college by the Southern Association of Colleges and Schools, faculty and students rang the "Victory Bell" in celebration for hours. After 40 years of growth, the institution was once again renamed, taking its present title of Texas Lutheran University in 1996. Over the 100 years since moving to Seguin, TLU's span has increased to over 40 buildings and sports fields on 184 acres with about 1,400 students each semester.

== Academics ==
Texas Lutheran University is ranked number five by the U.S. News & World Report 2022 Best West Regional Universities and is accredited by the Southern Association of Colleges and Schools Commission on Colleges. Specific programs are also accredited by ACBSP, CAATE, and TEAC.

== Campus ==
The campus lies just off Interstate 10 on State Highway 46, between US Highway 90 and Alt US 90. The address is 1000 West Court St., which is also Alt. U.S. 90, and Seguin's main east-west street.

The campus occupies more than 40 buildings and athletic fields covering 184 acres, as well as a biology field station at neighboring Lake McQueeney. Located in the heart of the campus is the Chapel of the Abiding Presence. There are several residence halls, as well as on-campus apartments and family housing for students who are married or have children. Student and alumni art can be found throughout campus, and sections of the sidewalk are designed for bricks dedicated to Texas Lutheran University affiliates. Oaks and other trees shade the campus, and rows of flowering crape myrtles provide color.

=== Chapel of the Abiding Presence ===
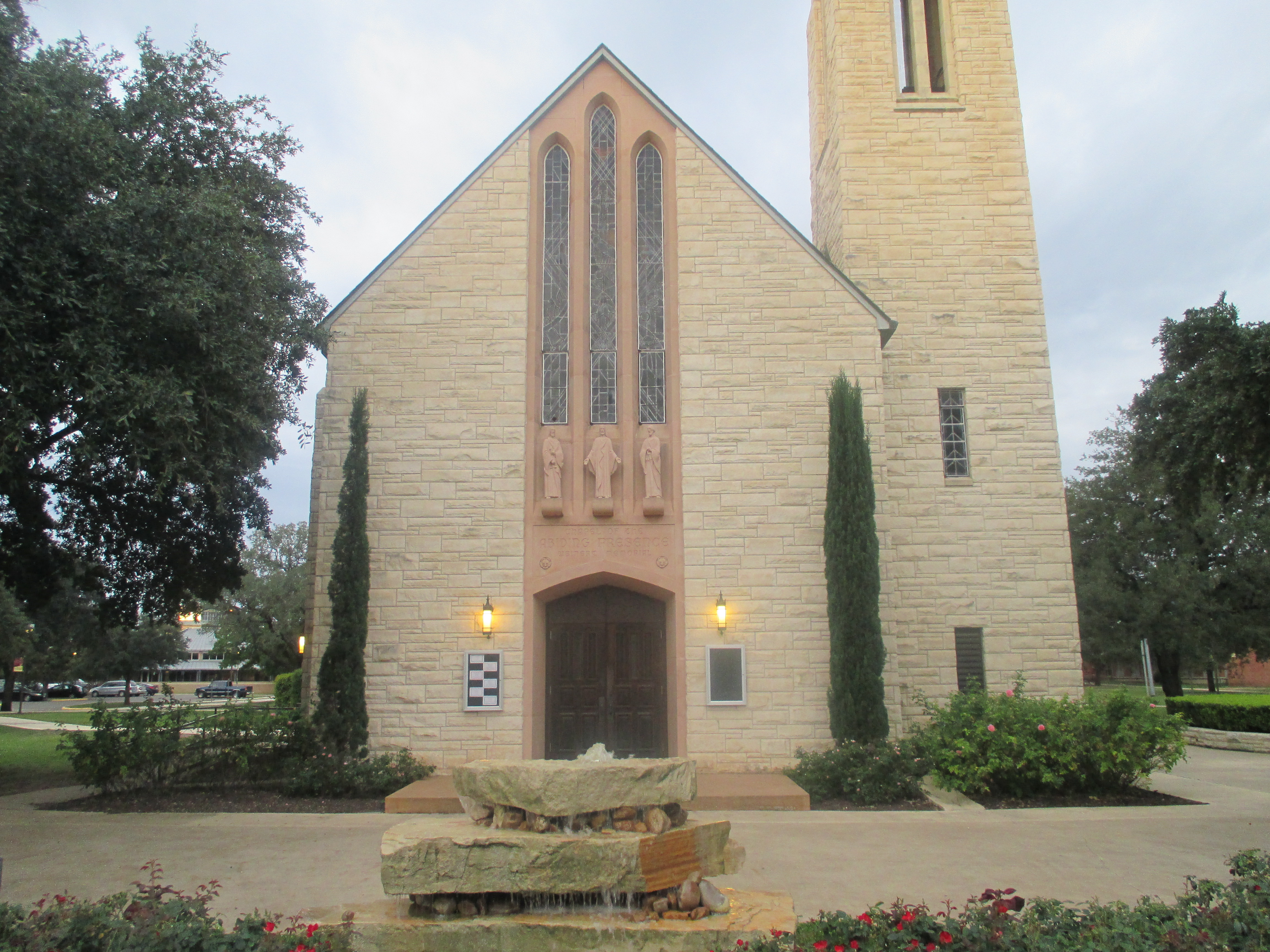
The Chapel of the Abiding Presence

The Chapel of the Abiding Presence (locally known as the Weinert Chapel after the principal donors) is located in the heart of the campus. The Gothic Revival building of Austin limestone was designed by ecclesiastical architect Henry Steinbomer of San Antonio in 1954. The Chapel is listed in the Historic Campus Architecture Project of the Council of Independent Colleges. After a fire in 1969, architect Edward Sovik from St. Olaf College in Minnesota supervised the rebuilding with a nontraditional interior.

Today, the sanctuary can seat 40 and hosts a tracker-action Schlicker organ. The chapel is used by campus organizations to hold various activities and services, as well as weddings of students and alumni.

Chapel services that last 20 minutes are open to the public. They are held Monday, Wednesday, and Friday at 10a.m.m during the academic year.

=== Other notable buildings ===
Also facing the quadrangle on the southwest corner was the Emma Frey Hall, a former women's dormitory in Spanish Colonial Revival style by noted architect Marvin Eichenroht in 1929. The building was the oldest on the campus and had been remodeled to serve as offices for computer science and mathematics faculty offices, as well as the honors programs. Emma Frey Hall was demolished in 2017.@Txlutheran (July 18, 2017). "TLU Bids Farewell to Emma Frey Hall" (Tweet) – via Twitter.

On the east side is Langner Hall, named for the first president of TLU, and built to plans by Atlee B. Ayers in 1947. Today, it houses classrooms and faculty offices for the social science and humanities departments, as well as the Mexican American Studies Center the Fiedler Memorial Museum, and an outdoor geological garden.

=== Residence halls ===
TLU offers a variety of housing options for students, including residence halls and on-campus apartments. Residence halls are co-ed or single-sex, and separated by grade level. Co-ed residences include Centennial, Clifton, Baldus, Trinity, Hahn, and Seguin Halls. Freshman residences include Centennial, Baldus, Trinity, and Clifton Halls. Sophomore residences include Seguin Hall.

On-campus apartments include the North, South Efficiency, and Glazener apartments, as well as Bogisch family housing. All on-campus units except for Bogisch family housing, are available to junior and senior-level students. The North and South apartments are two-bedroom units and house up to four students. The North units are equipped with a full kitchen, and the South units include a kitchenette. Glazener apartments have two bedrooms with a full kitchen and house up to two students. Bogisch family housing is reserved for students who are married or have children and have two bedrooms with a full kitchen.

Centennial Hall is the newest residence hall and features traditional community bathrooms. The resident hall is co-ed, with 160 beds.

=== Alumni Student Center ===
The ASC is located at the north end of the quadrangle. Inside is the bookstore, Lucky's Kennel snack bar, lounges, meeting rooms, a post office for on-campus mail, student publications offices and labs, and an academic computer lab. The ASC has offices for counseling, career development, and student activities.

=== Blumberg Library ===
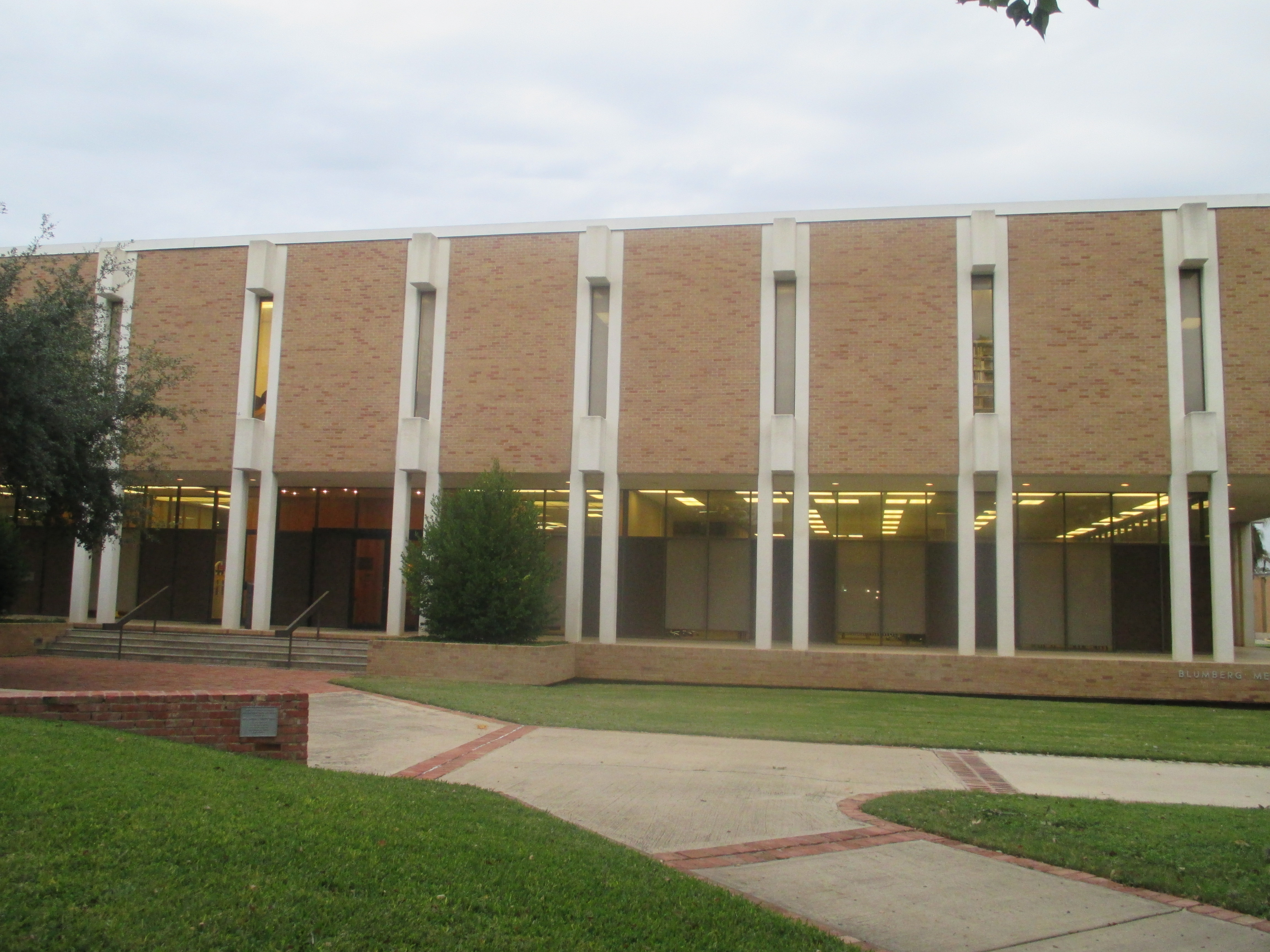
Blumberg Memorial Library at TLU opened in 1970

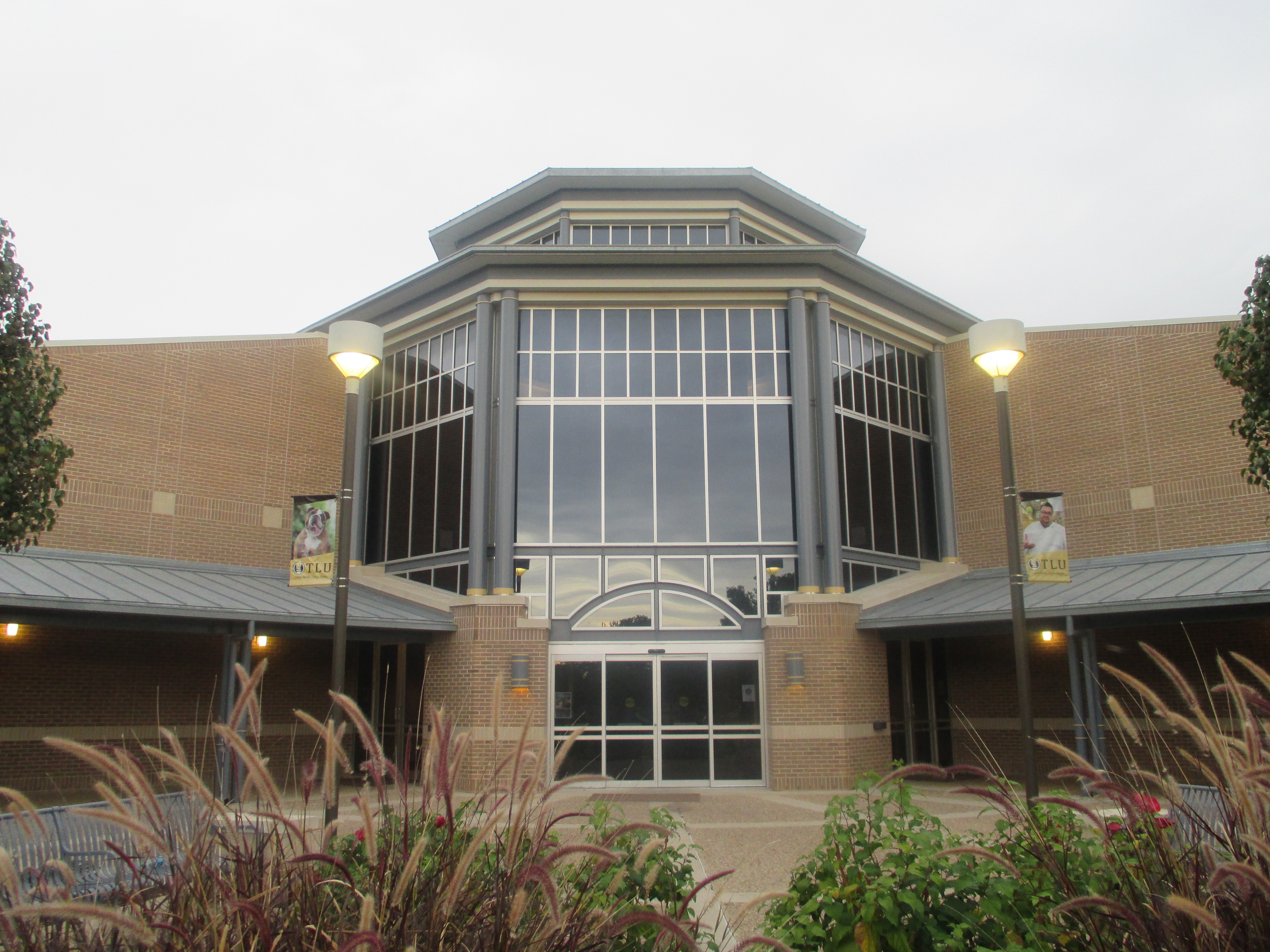
Weimar and Paula Hein Dining Center

The Blumberg Library, which opened in 1970, is next to the Alumni Student Center. It includes over 262,000 items of library materials and subscribes to over 700 journal titles. It is a member of the Online Computer Library Center system and also provides an online public access catalog, which gives students access to databases in each academic discipline.

=== Hein Dining Hall ===
Hein Dining Hall, with cafeteria-style service and food stations, is the main dining hall. The Centennial Commons seats 350 and is the general dining area for students. Other smaller dining rooms are the Timmerman Room, Suehs Room, and Katie Conference Center, which are often used by campus and community groups for meetings.

=== Jackson Auditorium ===
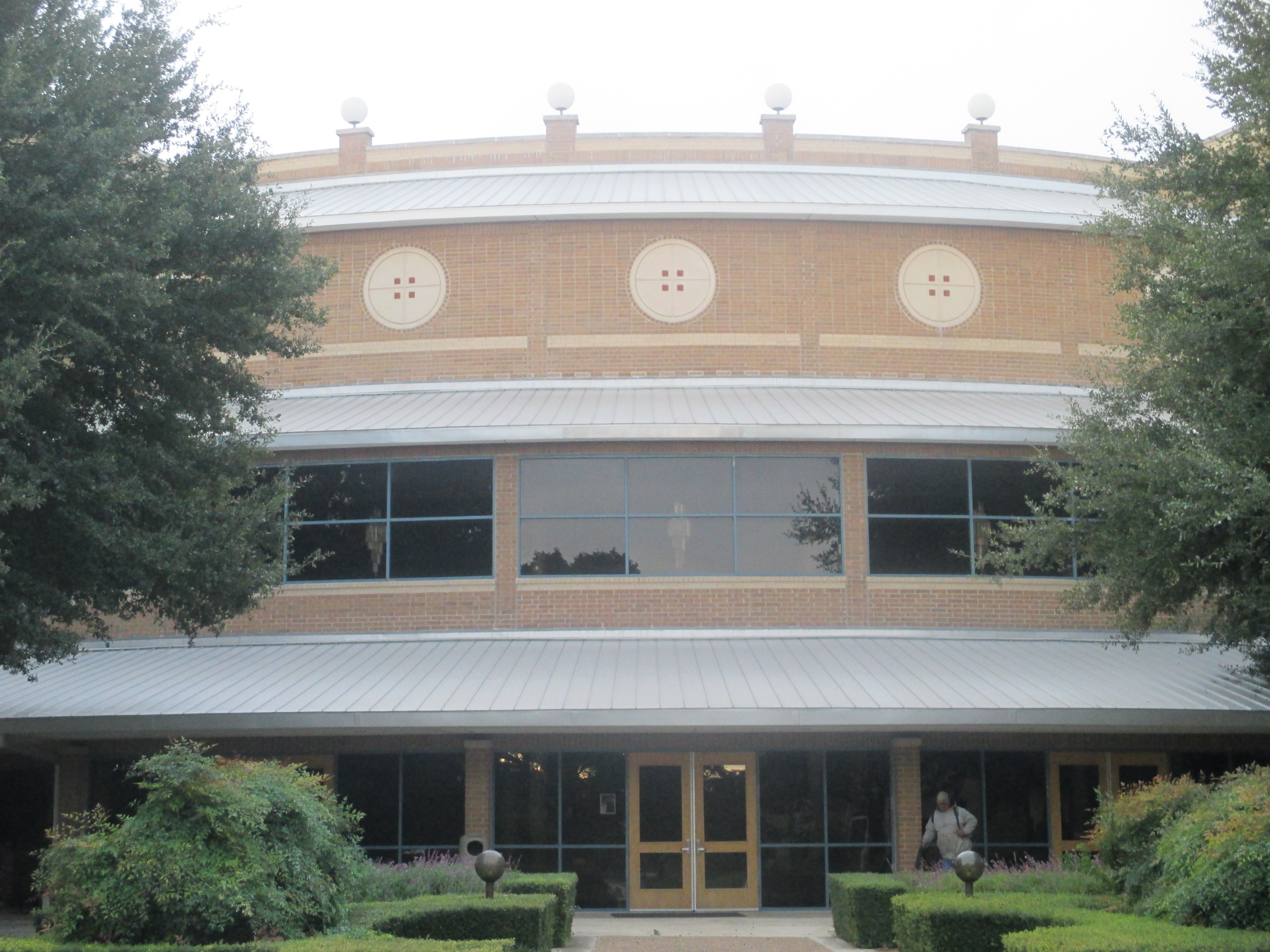
Jackson Auditorium seats 1,050 for concerts and other events.

Jackson Auditorium seats 1,050 and many of the special events at TLU, like the Krost Symposium or concerts, happen here. It is also used by the Mid-Texas Symphony and other community and church organizations.

=== Classrooms and other buildings ===
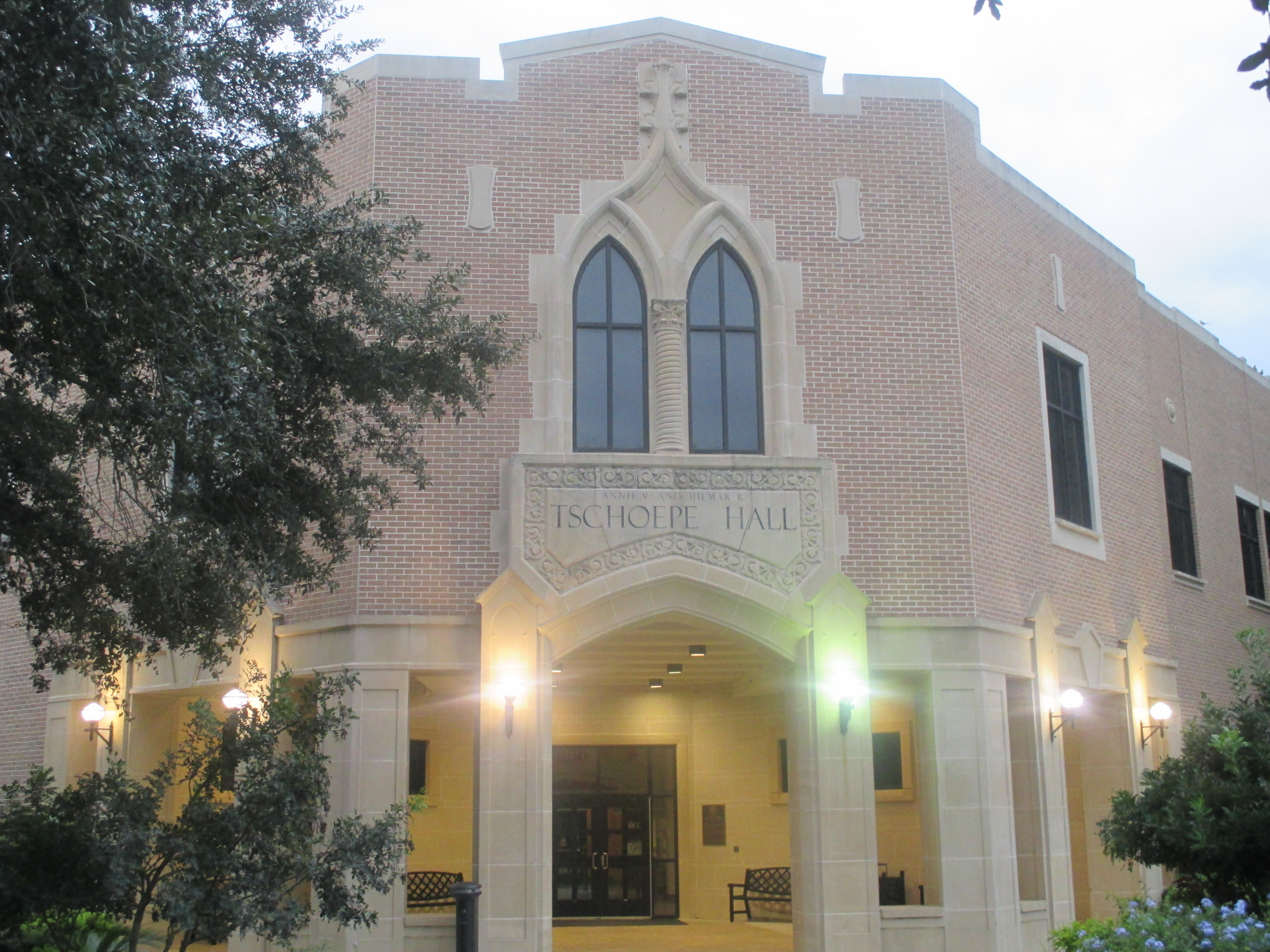
Tschoepe Hall, a classroom building

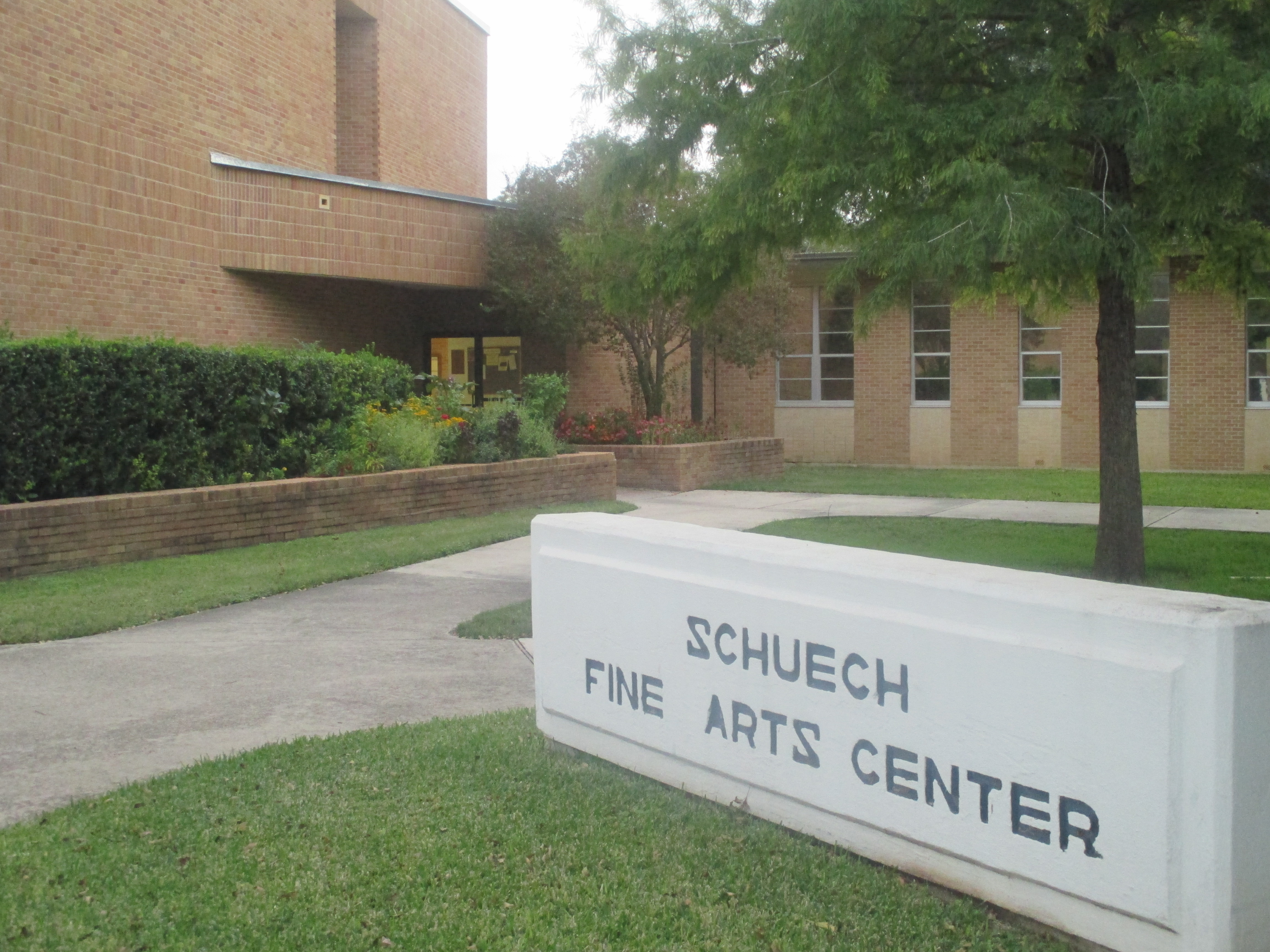
Schuech Fine Arts Center

Other campus buildings include O. G. Beck College Center, Moody Science Building, Tschoepe Hall, Health Center, Krost Center, Lutheran Ministry Center, Moline Center for Student Leadership, and the newest, Centennial Hall—named in celebration of 100 years in Seguin—with ground floor classrooms and housing above.

Schuech Fine Arts Center is a multipurpose facility with a 200-seat theater, recital hall, band hall, music studios, art labs, and a gallery.

The Jesse H. Jones Physical Education Complex, named for the former United States Secretary of Commerce Jesse H. Jones, has a 2,200-seat gym for intercollegiate basketball and volleyball games, offices for faculty and coaches, locker rooms, racquetball courts, and an eight-lane collegiate-size swimming pool, as well as the Grossman Fitness Center, the Kieffer Kinesiology Laboratory, and Rinn Field House.

The campus has intramural sports fields, the Gustafson Soccer Field, the Katt-Isbel Baseball Field, the Morck Softball Field, a putting green/driving range for the golf team, tennis courts, sandlot volleyball courts, a police department, and a maintenance complex.

A major expansion of intercollegiate sports was part of its 2013 Homecoming, when TLU officials broke ground for a football and track and field stadium, as well as a new and lighted softball field, lights for the baseball field (to allow night games), and a concession stand with toilets. The Bulldog teams began playing in the new facilities in 2014. The major expansion continued with the installation of lights for the Gustafson Soccer Field in 2015.

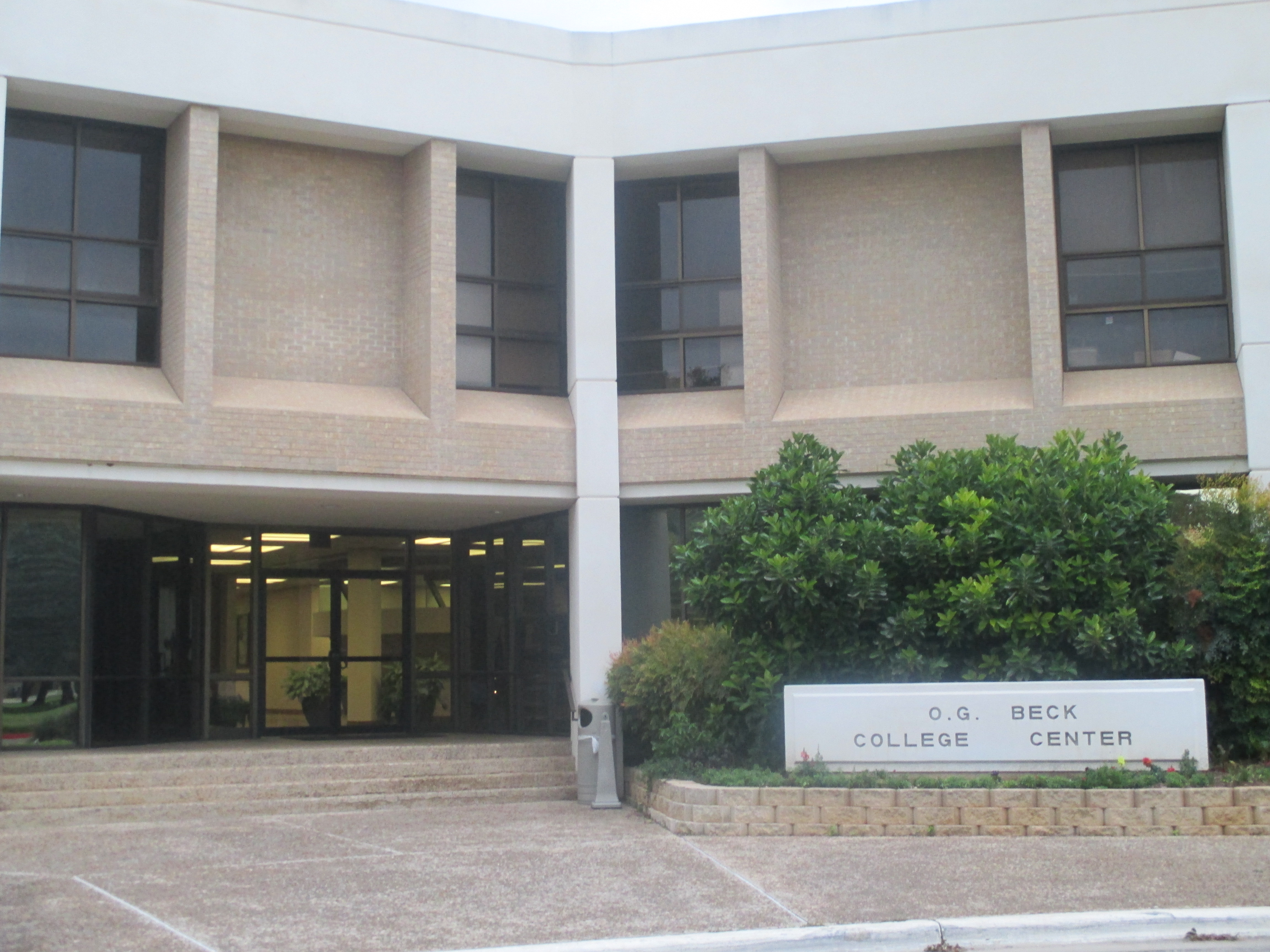
The O.G. Beck College Center, administrative headquarters

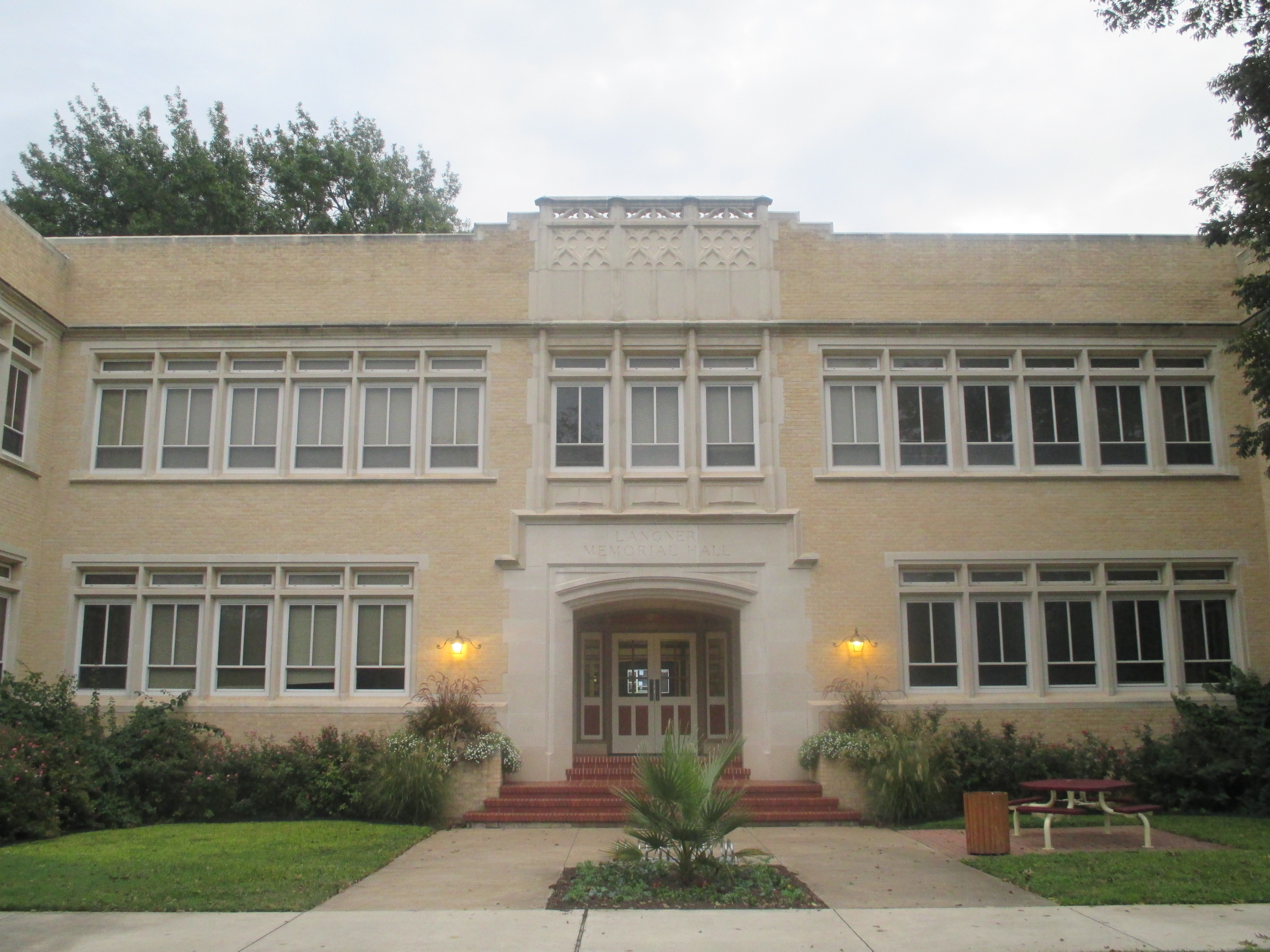
Langner Memorial Hall, named for the first president of TLU

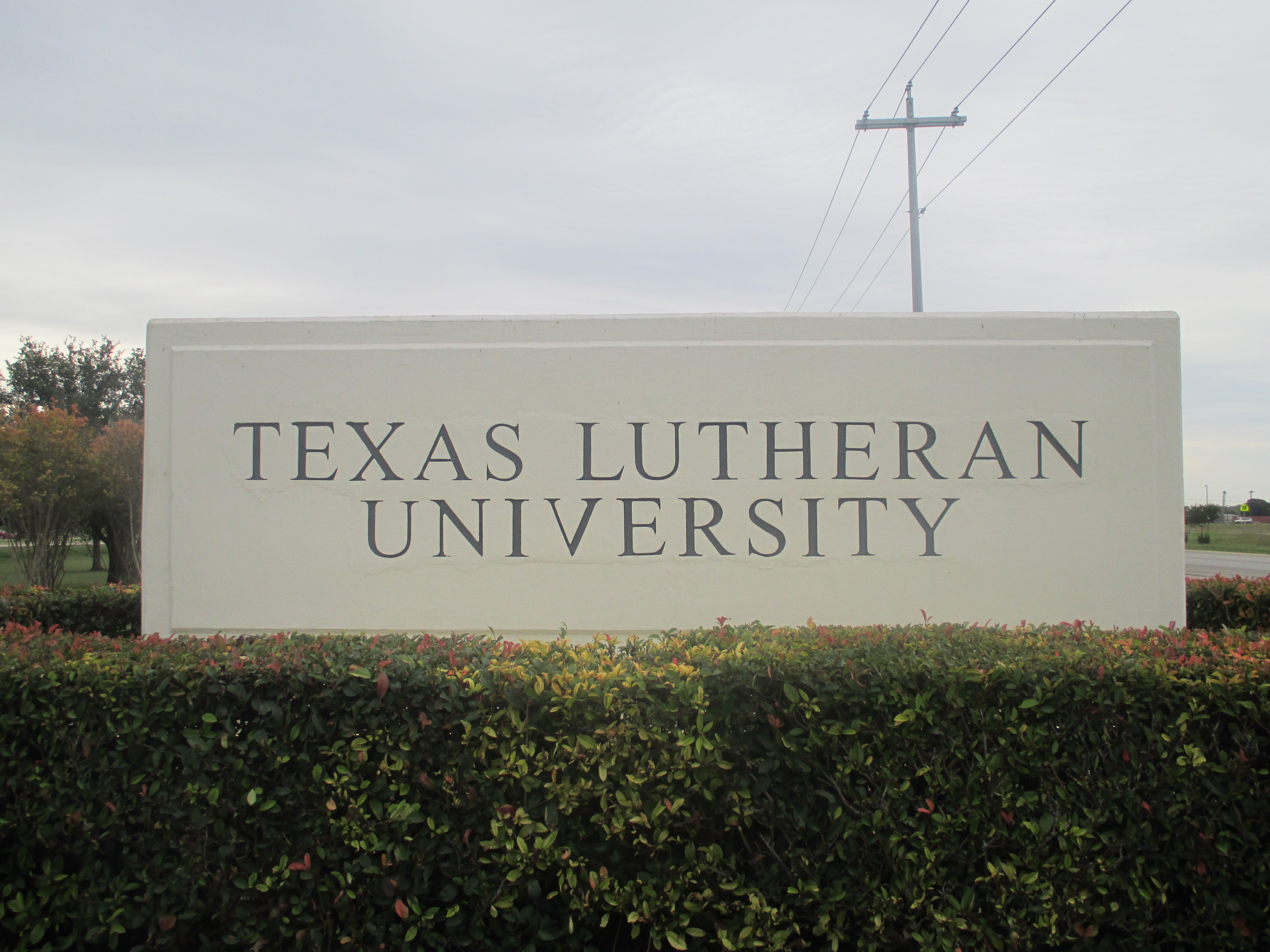
Entrance sign to Texas Lutheran University

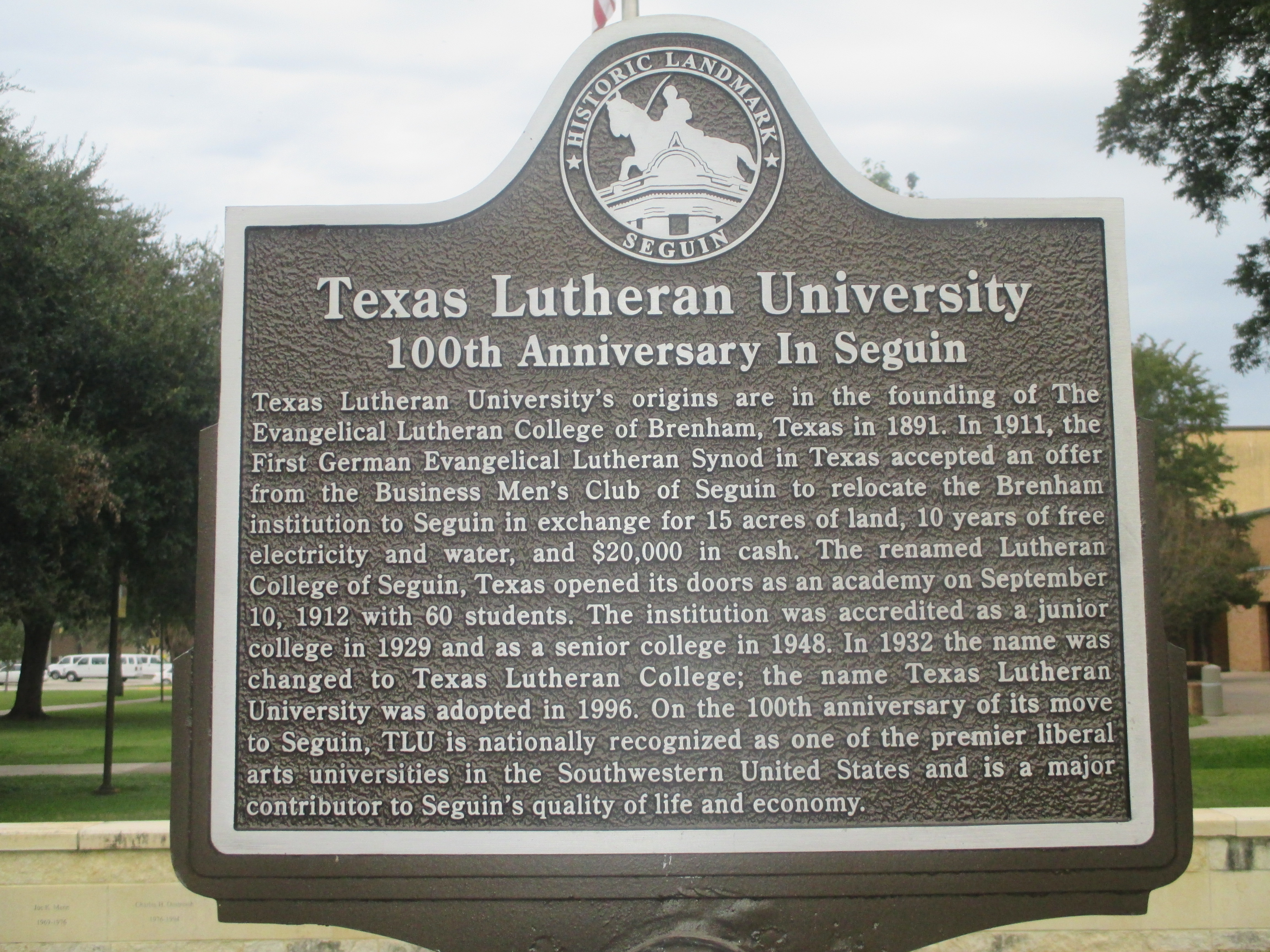
100th anniversary sign of TLU in Seguin

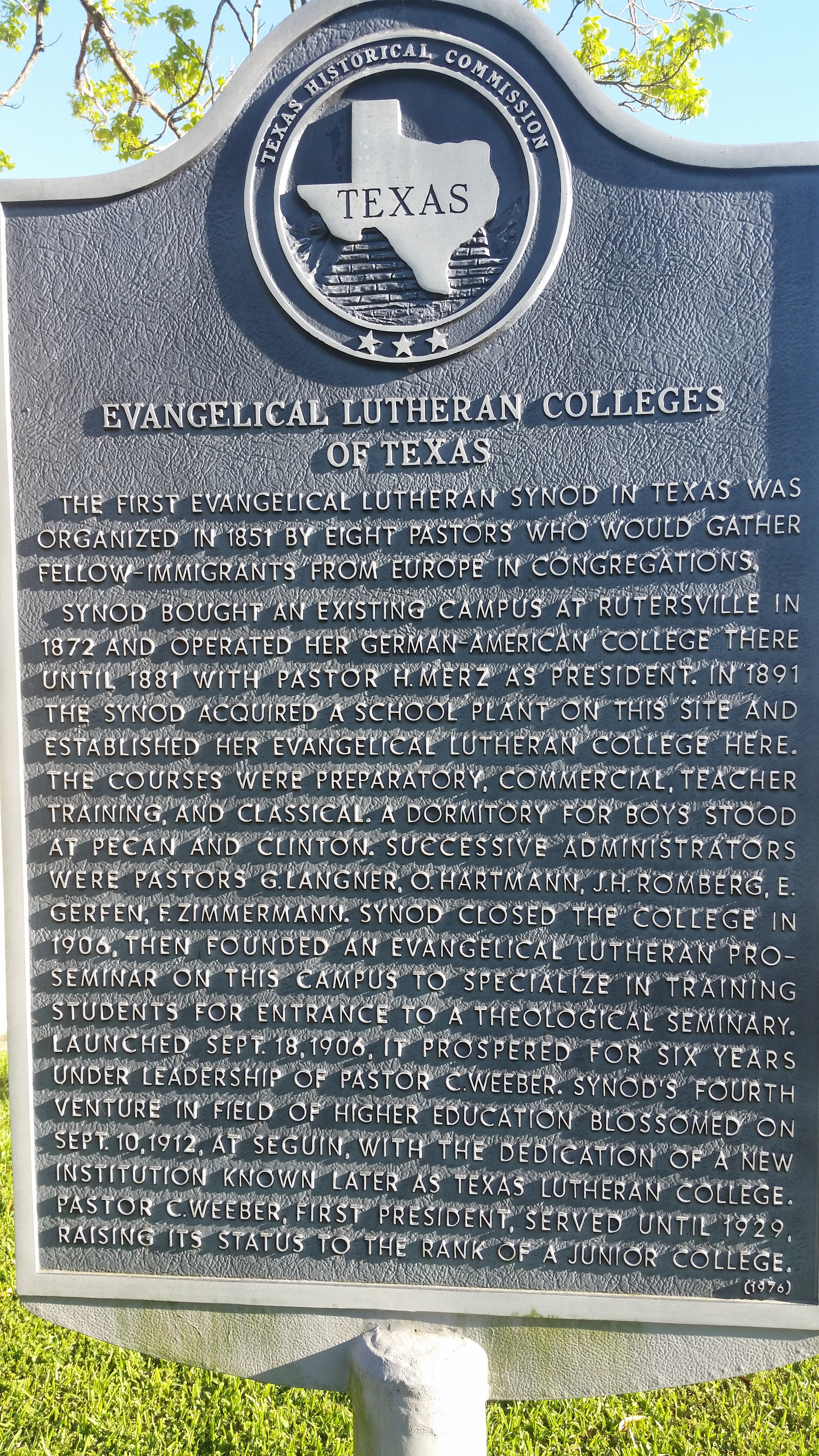
Texas Lutheran University historical marker in Brenham

== Student life ==
The Greek life opportunities for students include sororities and fraternities. The sororities include Beta Alpha Sigma, Xi Tau, Kappa Pi Gamma, and Sigma Delta Lambda. Fraternities include Sigma Phi Theta and Omega Tau.

Student organizations are offered in many areas on campus. Some are based on department, such as Athletic Training Club and Geography Club; Honorary Greek Organizations, such as Alpha Chi National Honors Society and Psi Chi Psychology Honors Society; Professional Organizations such as Alpha Kappa Psi National Business Fraternity and Student Education Association for Student Teachers; Band Service Fraternity and Sorority Kappa Kappa Psi, and Tau Beta Sigma; Campus Ministry and Religious Organizations such as Catholic Student Organization and Fellowship of Christian Athletes; Campus Organizations such as the Cheerleaders and the Student Government Association; Service and Social Organizations such as the Black Student Union and Mexican American Student Association; Theater Organizations such as Alpha Psi Omega, the theater honor society; Musical Organizations such as the variety of TLU choirs and TLU bands; Student Publications such as the Lone Star Lutheran Magazine and the Sidewalk; and others.

== Athletics ==
Texas Lutheran Bulldogs
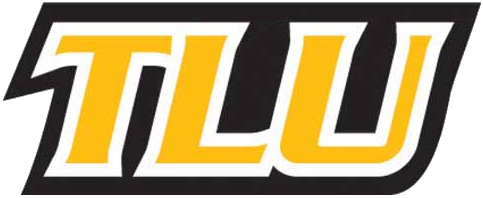
- University: Texas Lutheran University
- Nickname: Bulldogs
- NCAA: NCAA Division III
- Conference: Southern Collegiate Athletic Conference
- Athletic director: Bill Miller
- Location: Seguin, Texas
- Varsity teams: 18
- Football stadium: Bulldog Stadium
- Basketball arena: Jesse H. Jones Complex
- Baseball stadium: Katt-Isbel Baseball Field
- Softball stadium: Morck Softball Field
- Soccer field: Gustafson Soccer Field
- Colors: Black and gold
- Mascot: Bulldogs
- Website: www.tlubulldogs.com

Starting July 1, 2013, Texas Lutheran University switched to a new conference, competing in the Southern Collegiate Athletic Conference, in all sports except football; as the SCAC does not have enough member schools with football teams. Meanwhile, the football team has been a member of the American Southwest Conference since the 2017 fall season (2017–18 school year), which it competed from the 1998 to 1999 fall seasons (1998–99 to 1999–2000 school years) as an affiliate; before becoming a full member of the ASC from 2000–01 to 2012–13.

The schools in the SCAC are similar to TLU. Student-athletes receive no athletic scholarships. The others are Austin College in Sherman, Centenary College in Shreveport, Colorado College in Colorado Springs, University of Dallas in Irving, Schreiner University in Kerrville, Southwestern University in Georgetown, and Trinity University in San Antonio.

=== Varsity sports ===
Almost one-third of full-time TLU students take part in one of the intercollegiate sports. The Athletics Department includes baseball, softball, men's and women's basketball, men's and women's soccer, men's and women's golf, men's and women's tennis, volleyball, women's cross country, women's track & field, and recently football. All sports teams compete at the Division III level of the National Collegiate Athletic Association (NCAA) under the team name, the Bulldogs.

Men's sports	Women's sports
Baseball	Basketball
Basketball	Cross Country
Cross Country	Golf
Football	Soccer
Golf	Softball
Soccer	Tennis
Tennis	Track and field^{1}
Track and field^{1}	Volleyball
^{1} include both, indoor and outdoor

=== Conference championships ===
Sport	ASC	SCAC
Baseball	2005, 2006, 2007	2018 2021
Basketball (Men's)		2015, 2016, 2017, 2019
Basketball (Women's)		2014, 2019
Football		2013, 2014, 2015, 2024
Golf (Men's)	2006, 2007, 2011	
Golf (Women's)	2007	
Soccer (Men's)	2002	2019, 2025
Softball		2014, 2015, 2016, 2017, 2018, 2019, 2021, 2022, 2024
Track & Field (Men's)		2017, 2018, 2019
Track & Field (Women's)		2014
Volleyball	2007	2022

== Media ==
=== Lone Star Lutheran ===
The Lone Star Lutheran (LSL) was the student-run newspaper on the TLU campus since its founding in 1926. In 2011, the newspaper shifted to a magazine style format. In 2017 the newspaper ceased publication was replaced by TLU Student Media, a hub of student journalism run by a team of Student Editors.

=== Bulldog TV ===
Bulldog TV is the cable channel that is all about TLU.

== Christmas Vespers ==
In preparation for the Christmas holidays, the TLU choirs collaborate with the TLU band to host the annual Christmas Vespers services. This celebration of music and word honors the integral role music has played and is playing in Texas Lutheran curriculum and cultural history. The service is usually held four days in Seguin and one or two days in Austin to allow the campus and Seguin communities, as well as TLU families and the Austin community, the opportunity to attend the service.

== Krost Symposium ==
Every year, Texas Lutheran hosts a symposium focusing on a particular new topic. This multi-day Krost Symposium event brings in guest speakers with a range of viewpoints and experiences on the chosen topic. The first Krost Symposium was held in 1981 and the program has continued annually without interruption ever since. Events are free and open to the public.

== Notable alumni ==
- Laurie Corbelli was a member of the TLU team that won the 1975 & 1976 AIAW Division II National Championship. She was a Silver Medalist with the 1984 U.S. Olympic Volleyball Team, and now is head coach of the Texas A&M Aggies women's volleyball team
- Lee Eun-chul was a student from South Korea, who competed at five Olympic Games from 1984 to 2000. He was the Olympic Gold Medal winner at the 1992 Games in Barcelona.
- Cameron Beckman graduated from TLU in 1993 and became a PGA Tour golfer. He earned his third PGA Tour title at the 2010 Mayakoba Golf Classic.
- Alton Chung Ming Chan is a Grammy Award nominated concert pianist. He earned his undergraduate degree at TLU, and his Masters and PhD. at the University of North Texas College of Music.
- Edmund Kuempel received a Bachelor of Business Administration from TLU. He was a Republican member of the Texas House of Representatives from Guadalupe County for some twenty-seven years until he died in 2010.
- Steven Long attended Alvin Community College, Texas Lutheran College (now TLU), and Sam Houston State University. From 1977 until 1988, Long owned and published the In Between, a weekly newspaper in Galveston. After closing the In Between, Long worked for the Houston Chronicle for six years and was later assigned by the New York Post to cover high-profile cases, such as the case of Andrea Yates, and the fall of Enron.
- Verne Lundquist graduated from Texas Lutheran College (now TLU) in 1962. Lundquist, called "the Golden Voice", is currently a play-by-play sportscaster by CBS Television Sports, covering college football and baseball, as well as major golfing events. In 2007 he was inducted into the Hall of Fame of the National Sportscasters and Sportswriters Association.
- Steve Lutz Division 1 head men’s basketball coach for Texas A&M Corpus Christi and an assistant for Purdue and Creighton. Graduated from Texas Lutheran with a Bachelor in Secondary Education.
- Don Mischer is a producer and director of television and live events. He attended TLU and graduated from the University of Texas at Austin in 1961. He has won fifteen Emmy Awards, ten Directors Guild of America Awards for Outstanding Directorial Achievement, two NAACP Image Awards, a Peabody Award for excellence in broadcasting, and the 2012 Norman Lear Achievement Award in Television from the Producers Guild of America.
- Getoar Mjeku, BA in political science, class of 2010 — Kosovo Albanian lawyer and politician, deputy minister of economy, and formerly deputy minister of industry, entrepreneurship and trade of Kosovo
- Faton Bislimi graduated from TLU with a B.S. in computer science and a B.A. in math. Bislimi wrote for the Albanian daily Bota So and worked with the Albanian-American Civic League. He wrote two books, a compilation of math problems and a series of journalistic writings titled Në Rrugëtim me Kosovën: Tatëpjetat dhe të Përpjetat. He founded The Bislimi Groutoto to offer better education opportunities to Kosovar students, and 13 full scholarships have been awarded through The Bislimi Group.
- Chris Elley graduated from TLU with a B.A. in Communication Studies, and earned a Master's in Mass Communications from Texas State University. Elley is the founder and current Director of Austin, Texas-based film production company Electro-Fish Media Inc. He holds two Emmy Awards and two additional nominations.
- Scott Seely, B.A. in church music, bishop suffragan of the Anglican Diocese of All Nations.
- Jeff Hiller, actor and comedian, B.A. 1998
