= Sold American (album) =

Studio album by Kinky Friedman
- Released: 1973
- Genre: Country
- Label: Vanguard
- Producer: Chuck Glaser

Kinky Friedman chronology
Sold American (1973)	Kinky Friedman (1974)

Sold American is the debut album by the American musician Kinky Friedman, released in 1973. He was backed by his band, the Texas Jewboys. The album's release was delayed while Vanguard Records debated whether to use the name of the band on the album cover. Friedman supported it with a North American tour; he claimed that a bomb threat was called in when the band played Max's Kansas City. Bob Dylan attended a show at the Troubadour and told Friedman that he wanted to work with him; Friedman later participated in Dylan's Rolling Thunder Revue. The title track peaked at No. 69 on Billboard's Hot C&W Sides chart.

== Production ==
Friedman spent much of his Peace Corps time in Borneo composing songs. He was influenced primarily by the simplicity of bluegrass music. It took two years for him to sign a contract with a record label. Sold American, on which Billy Swan played bass, was produced by Chuck Glaser. "Highway Cafe" is a tale about a waitress who misses a truckdriver who was killed in a highway accident. "The Ballad of Charles Whitman" is about the perpetrator of the University of Texas tower shooting; a Nashville DJ was allegedly fired for playing it all day. The title track is about a former country singer who has fallen on hard times. "Ride 'Em Jewboy" uses country tropes to explore the Jewish diaspora after World War II; it was criticized by a B'nai B'rith group. The protagonist of "We Reserve the Right to Refuse Service to You" is refused service at a restaurant because of his Jewish faith; he later refuses induction into the armed forces. "Get Your Biscuits in the Oven and Your Buns in the Bed" lampoons the women's liberation movement; it was nominated by the National Organization for Women for a "Keep Her in Her Place Award". "High on Jesus" finds similarities between Jesus freaks and drug addicts.

== Critical reception ==
Professional ratings
Review scores
Source	Rating
All Music Guide to Country	4/5 stars
Robert Christgau	B
The Encyclopedia of Popular Music	3/5 stars
The Gazette	A−
MusicHound Country: The Essential Album Guide	2.5/5 stars
The New Rolling Stone Record Guide	4/5 stars

The Chicago Tribune noted that "Kinky and crew are making it their business to put tongues in cheeks and kosher in country." The Chicago Sun-Times called the album "the most exciting country debut album since John Prine's." The Detroit Free Press considered it "the most outrageous and best satirical album since the Fugs fractured the normal vinyl mold a few years back." Dave Marsh dismissed Friedman as "just another Archie Bunker in ultra-hip reverse" and opined that his band "are outdone by everyone from bland, jaded California sophisticates like Poco and the New Riders of the Purple Sage to rough-and-tumble attempted hippies like Waylon Jennings."

Robert Christgau said that Friedman's "unique cross between Woody Guthrie and Henny Youngman extends to his singing." The Gazette called Sold American "a definitive work, one that captures the macho mood of Texas truckstops and honky tonks". The Kansas City Star described Friedman as "something of a social propagandist using country and western music to tear apart the country and western style of life." The Star Tribune called him "a major country artist, an off-beat humorist and a progressive in an artform that is noted for its narrow traditions." The Honolulu Star-Bulletin likened Friedman and the Jewboys to Dan Hicks and His Hot Licks. Lester Bangs, in Rolling Stone, called Friedman "a rare talent with something new to say that's both funny and eloquent." In 2000, Country Music: The Rough Guide opined that "Sold American" was an example of outlaw country and "one of the finest songs of the era".

== Track listing ==
Side one

1. "We Reserve the Right to Refuse Service to You" – 4:02
2. "Highway Cafe" – 3:36
3. "Sold American" – 3:15
4. "Flyin' Down the Freeway" – 3:11
5. "Ride 'Em Jewboy" – 5:35

Side two

1. "Get Your Biscuits in the Oven and Your Buns in the Bed" –2:23
2. "High on Jesus" – 3:51
3. "The Ballad of Charles Whitman" – 3:04
4. "Top Ten Commandments" – 3:22
5. "Western Union Wire" – 3:13
6. "Silver Eagle Express" – 3:47
