= Chris Elley =

American film director

- Born: September 15, 1977 (age 47); San Antonio, Texas
- Occupation(s): Film director, Documentary Film, Writer, and Producer

Chris Elley (born September 15, 1977, in San Antonio, Texas) is the founder and current director of the Austin, Texas-based film production company Electro-Fish Media Inc. He holds two Emmy awards and two additional nominations.

== Early career ==
Elley began his film career at the age of 15, producing short films and a local cable variety show in his hometown of Seguin, Texas that included appearances by celebrities such as Will Smith and Boyz II Men. By age 16, he was interning for San Antonio CBS television station KENS-TV. There, he covered the NBA San Antonio Spurs. Elley produced film material throughout high school and college, including hundreds of TV commercials. The international television debut of his work came in 1996 when he won a national video contest sponsored by Friskies cat food that premiered his commercial during The Price Is Right. Elley earned a bachelor's degree in Communications Studies from Texas Lutheran University and a master's degree in Mass Communication from Texas State University.

== Career ==
In 1999, he accepted the position of Senior Producer of Creative Services for the CBS-owned and operated television station in Austin, Texas. He would later be promoted to On-Air Director, Creative Services before leaving the station in 2001 to produce private content.

Elley directed the 2004 cultural documentary "Barbecue: A Texas Love Story" (named to "Best of SXSW" series for the South by Southwest Film Festival) featuring Ann Richards, Dan Rather, Kinky Friedman, Art Alexakis, Ray Benson and others. The film screened at film festivals around the United States and for U.S. Congressional members, was released on DVD in 2005 and re-released in 2009. The film is available nationally at Netflix and was nominated for an Emmy Award in the category "Outstanding Achievement in Documentary Program".

Previously, Elley had directed a documentary film on the NASA Apollo space missions titled In the Shadow of the Moon: People of the American Space Program and a documentary film on the Texas Theatre in Seguin, Texas titled A Projection of History.

In 2007, Elley's Electro-Fish Media released a documentary film about people who live in an abandoned ghost town in the West Texas desert, titled Ghost Town: 24 Hours in Terlingua. That film received an Emmy Award for "Outstanding Achievement in Documentary – Cultural" and was Emmy-nominated for "Outstanding Achievement in Editing."

In 2009, Electro-Fish Media received an Emmy Award for "Outstanding Program Achievement – Heritage" for their series on Loudoun County, Virginia which can be viewed at the site for Loudoun Convention and Visitors Association.

As of January 2010 Elley is currently producing and directing a documentary feature on football in Texas and is on hiatus from producing and directing a film on the current state of country music. That film closely follows Texas musicians the Randy Rogers Band and features musicians such as Tracy Lawrence, Dierks Bentley and Shooter Jennings.

Elley splits his directing, producing and writing responsibilities with his wife and collaborator Cile Spelce. Elley splits editing duties with co-editor Dave Rehm. Elley also contributes to magazines such as Chile Pepper Magazine.

== Public speaking ==
Elley frequently speaks on Texas culture in academic or pop culture settings. In June, 2005 he joined Dan Rather and a handful of other Texans in New York City's Madison Square Park to educate New Yorkers on the significance of Texas BBQ to the state's identity. He has also appeared on numerous radio and television shows including BBQ with Bobby Flay on the Food Network and the international radio program Voice of America.

== Critical reviews / press ==
Reviews of Barbecue: A Texas Love Story

- efilmcritic.com
- Austin Chronicle
- FilmThreat
- MSN Slate Magazine

Reviews of Ghost Town: 24 Hours in Terlingua

- Pegasus News
