= Menachem Ilan =

Israeli sports shooter

Personal information
- Birth name: מנחם אילן
- Born: January 18, 1960 (age 65); Israel

Sport
- Country: Israel
- Sport: Sport shooting
- Events: Men's Small-Bore Rifle, Prone, 50 metres; Men's Small-Bore Rifle, Three Positions, 50 metres

Menachem Ilan (Hebrew: מנחם אילן; born January 18, 1960) is an Israeli former sport shooter.

He is Jewish, and was born in Israel.

He competed for Israel at the 1992 Summer Olympics in Barcelona, at the age of 32, in Shooting--Men's Small-Bore Rifle, Prone, 50 metres, and came in tied for 39th. He also competed in Shooting--Men's Small-Bore Rifle, Three Positions, 50 metres, and came in 41st.
