= Hubert Bichler =

German sport shooter (born 1959)

Hubert Bichler (born September 2, 1959 in Holzkirchen, Upper Bavaria) is a German sport shooter. He competed at the 1992 Summer Olympics in the men's 50 metre rifle three positions event, in which he tied for 17th place, and the men's 50 metre rifle prone event, in which he placed fourth.
