= Ryohei Koba =

Japanese sports shooter (born 1962)

Personal information
- Born: 13 December 1962 (age 63) Kagoshima City, Kagoshima Prefecture, Japan
Medal record
Men's shooting
Representing Japan
Olympic Games
Bronze medal – third place	1992 Barcelona	50 m rifle three positions

Ryohei Koba (木場 良平, Koba Ryōhei; born 13 December 1962) is a Japanese sport shooter. He was born in Kagoshima Prefecture. He won a bronze medal in 50 metre rifle three positions at the 1992 Summer Olympics in Barcelona. Koba was born in Kagoshima.
