= Massimo Birindelli =

Italian sports shooter

Personal information
- Nationality: Italian
- Born: 19 June 1956 (age 68); Pisa, Italy

Sport
- Sport: Sports shooting

Massimo Birindelli (born 19 June 1956) is an Italian sports shooter. He competed in the men's 50 metre rifle prone event at the 1992 Summer Olympics.
