= Hrachya Petikyan =

Armenian sports shooter (born 1960)

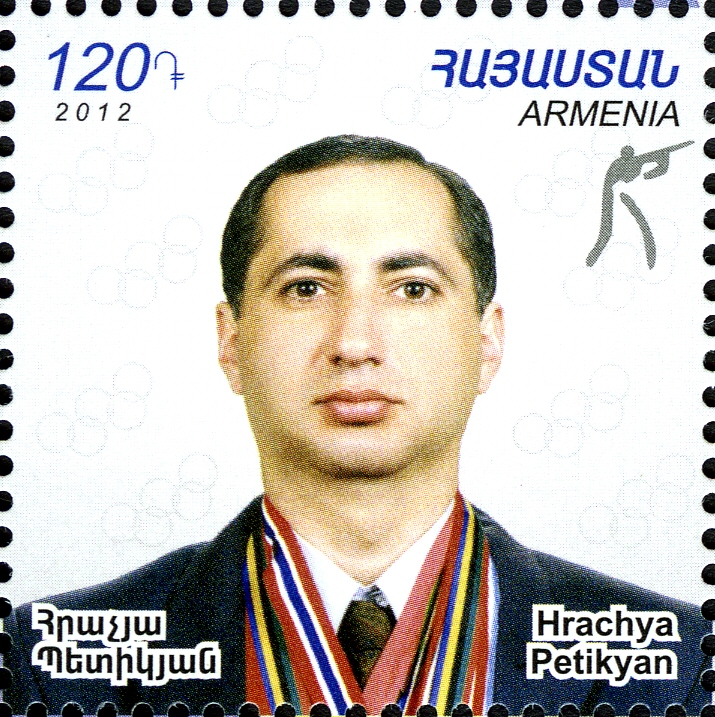

Personal information
- Born: 23 February 1960 (age 66) Yerevan, Armenian SSR, Soviet Union
- Height: 1.74 m (5 ft 8 1/2 in)
- Weight: 78 kg (172 lb)

Sport
- Country: Armenia
- Sport: Sport shooting
- Club: Dynamo Yerevan
Medal record
Olympic Games
Gold medal – first place	1992 Barcelona	50 m rifle three positions
ISSF World Shooting Championships
Gold medal – first place	1986 Suhl	50 m rifle kneeling, Team
Silver medal – second place	1986 Suhl	50 m rifle three positions, Team
Bronze medal – third place	1986 Suhl	50 m rifle standing, Team
Gold medal – first place	1990 Moscow	50 m rifle three positions, Team
Gold medal – first place	1990 Moscow	300 m rifle three positions, Team
Gold medal – first place	1990 Moscow	50 m rifle standing, Team
Silver medal – second place	1990 Moscow	50 m rifle kneeling, Team
Silver medal – second place	1990 Moscow	300 m rifle kneeling, Team
Silver medal – second place	1990 Moscow	300 m rifle standing, Team
Bronze medal – third place	1990 Moscow	50 m rifle three positions
Bronze medal – third place	1990 Moscow	50 m rifle kneeling
European Shooting Championships
Gold medal – first place	1985 Osijek	50 m rifle three positions, Team
Bronze medal – third place	1985 Osijek	50 m rifle three positions
Gold medal – first place	1988 Stavanger	10 m air rifle
Bronze medal – third place	1988 Stavanger	10 m air rifle, Team
Gold medal – first place	1989 Zagreb	50 m rifle standing
Silver medal – second place	1993 Brno	50 m rifle three positions

Hrachya Petikyan (Armenian: Հրաչյա Պետիկյան, born 23 February 1960) is an Armenian sports shooter and USSR, European, four-time World and Olympic Champion. Petikyan is a four-time Olympian who has represented three nations: the Soviet Union, the Unified Team and Armenia. He has been awarded the Honored Master of Sport of the USSR title.

Petikyan started shooting in the Yerevan dynamo sports club under the honored coach of Armenia, Martyn Kalechyan. For many years, Petikyan was a member of the USSR national team and a Champion of Europe and the World in individual and team competitions. He has also won many medals at ISSF world competitions that are now discontinued.

At the 1988 Summer Olympics, competing as a Soviet, Petikyan participated in the 10 metre air rifle and the 50 metre rifle, three positions. He notably came in sixth place in the latter.

Petikyan was entrusted with carrying the Armenian flag at the 1992 Summer Olympics in Barcelona. He won the gold medal in the 50 metre rifle three positions and set the Olympic record at 1,267.4 in the finals. He also came in eighth place in the 50 metre rifle prone, meaning he had ranked in the top eight of every rifle competition at the Olympics.

Petikyan now began representing his native Armenia. He competed for Armenia at the 1996 Summer Olympics and 2000 Summer Olympics, each in his specialty, the men's 50 metre rifle three positions. However, he was unable to qualify for the finals at either Olympics.

In 1997, he headed the Armenian Shooting Federation and junior sports school for shooting in Armenia. In 2007, Petikyan participated in the ceremony to light the fire for the IV Pan-Armenian Games.
