= Cheung Sha Wan Catholic Secondary School =

School in Cheung Sha Wan, Hong Kong

- 長沙灣天主教英文中學
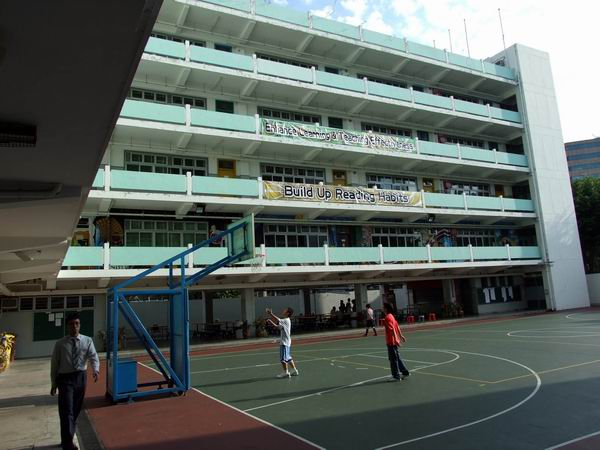
- 533 Fuk Wing Street, Cheung Sha Wan, Kowloon, Hong Kong

Information
- Motto: Self Strengthening and Continuous Improvement
- Religious affiliation: Catholic
- Established: 20 November 1970; 55 years ago
- School district: Sham Shui Po District
- President: Mr. Tsang Kin Wah Francis
- Principal: Poon Shing Kai Calepodius
- Grades: Secondary 1 to Secondary 6
- Houses: St Mathew, St. John, St. Mark and St. Luke
- Colours: Green, Yellow
- Website: Official website

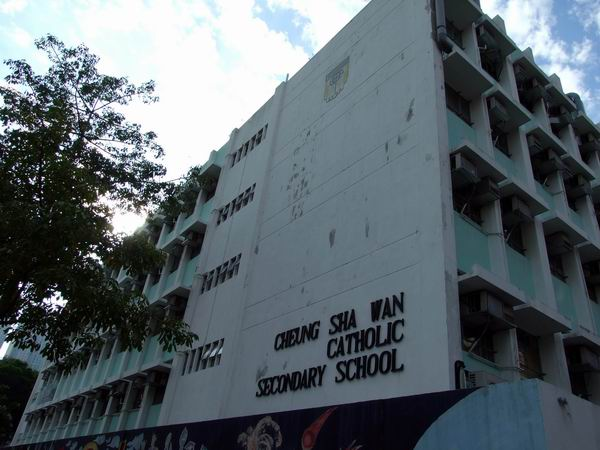

Cheung Sha Wan Catholic Secondary School (Chinese: 長沙灣天主教英文中學, abbr. CSWCSS) is one of Hong Kong's leading English boys' schools. It was established on 20 November 1970 by the Catholic Diocese of Hong Kong. The school is situated on Fuk Wing Street, Cheung Sha Wan, Hong Kong.

In 2017, the school ranked 73 among the top 100 schools in Hong Kong. It is one of the best schools in Sham Shui Po. Most Form 1 new students are in band 1.

== Campus ==
The campus is located at 533 Fuk Wing Street, Cheung Sha Wan, Kowloon, Hong Kong.

== Student life ==
=== Sports ===
The school places strong emphasis on sports education, volleyball in particular. The school consecutively acquired the championship of boys' overall grades at the Hong Kong Catholic Diocesan Secondary Schools Joint Athletics Meet, 16 times from 1976 to 2010. The school has recaptured the boy overall champion at the 21st Meet during November 2013 with champions in Boy B and C grades and 1st runner-up in Boy A grade.

==== STEM education ====
Being selected by the Government of Hong Kong to receive a funding of HK$7 million to promote STEM education, the school has been promoting such development over the past years through running the Enriched IT programme, and the formation of their Innovative Technology Society.
