= Shooting at the 1992 Summer Olympics – Men's 50 metre rifle three positions =

Sports shooting at the Olympics

Men's 50 metre rifle three positions at the Games of the XXV Olympiad
- Venue: Mollet del Vallès
- Date: 31 July 1992
- Competitors: 42 from 24 nations
- Winning score: 1267.4 (OR)

Medalists
1st place, gold medalist(s)		Hrachya Petikyan	Unified Team
2nd place, silver medalist(s)		Robert Foth	United States
3rd place, bronze medalist(s)		Ryohei Koba	Japan

Men's 50 metre rifle three positions (then known as small-bore free rifle) was one of the thirteen shooting events at the 1992 Summer Olympics. It was the first Olympic competition after the introduction of the new target in 1989, and thus two Olympic records were set, by Juha Hirvi (qualification round) and Hrachya Petikyan (final). Petikian won ahead of Robert Foth and Ryohei Koba, after a poor final demoted Hirvi to fourth place.

== Qualification round ==
Rank	Athlete	Country	Prone	Stand	Kneel	Total	Notes
1	Juha Hirvi	Finland	398	384	390	1172	Q OR
2	Ryohei Koba	Japan	393	387	391	1171	Q
3	Robert Foth	United States	395	386	388	1169	Q
4	Hrachya Petikyan	Unified Team	399	383	387	1169	Q
5	Peter Gabrielsson	Sweden	398	379	391	1168	Q
6	Rajmond Debevec	Slovenia	394	387	386	1167	Q
7	Harald Stenvaag	Norway	397	381	388	1166	Q
8	Zsolt Vári	Hungary	398	379	387	1164	Q
9	Nemanja Mirosavljev	Independent Olympic Participants	397	374	392	1163	
10	Jiang Rong	China	398	384	381	1163	
11	Petr Kůrka	Czechoslovakia	394	382	386	1162	
11	Lee Eun-chul	South Korea	396	378	388	1162	
11	Jari Pälve	Finland	395	378	389	1162	
14	Tadeusz Czerwiński	Poland	397	374	389	1160	
14	Thomas Farnik	Austria	391	382	387	1160	
16	Jean-Pierre Amat	France	395	376	388	1159	
17	Hubert Bichler	Germany	399	370	389	1158	
17	Cha Young-chul	South Korea	399	377	382	1158	
17	Goran Maksimović	Independent Olympic Participants	396	379	383	1158	
20	Attila Záhonyi	Hungary	395	381	381	1157	
21	Milan Bakeš	Czechoslovakia	397	375	383	1155	
21	Michel Bury	France	396	371	388	1155	
21	David Johnson	United States	394	379	382	1155	
24	Norbert Sturny	Switzerland	391	373	390	1154	
25	Klavs Jørn Christensen	Denmark	395	374	384	1153	
26	Enrique Claverol Martínez	Spain	393	375	384	1152	
26	Olimpiu Marin	Romania	398	367	387	1152	
26	Wayne Sorensen	Canada	398	366	388	1152	
29	Nils Petter Håkedal	Norway	400	368	383	1151	
29	Bernd Rücker	Germany	395	373	383	1151	
31	Kirill Ivanov	Unified Team	396	372	382	1150	
31	Zhang Yingzhou	China	390	374	386	1150	
33	Michel Dion	Canada	393	365	388	1146	
33	Andreas Zumbach	Switzerland	392	375	379	1146	
35	Jorge González	Spain	390	367	388	1145	
35	Jacek Kubka	Poland	396	374	375	1145	
37	Jørgen Just Herlufsen	Denmark	395	365	381	1141	
38	Alister Miller Allan	Great Britain	399	361	380	1140	
38	Wolfram Waibel	Austria	394	367	379	1140	
40	Akihiro Mera	Japan	394	370	373	1137	
41	Menachem Ilan	Israel	390	362	380	1132	
42	Ricardo Rusticucci	Argentina	392	350	368	1110	

OR Olympic record – Q Qualified for final

== Final ==
Rank	Athlete	Qual	Final	Total	Notes
1st place, gold medalist(s)	Hrachya Petikyan (EUN)	1169	98.4	1267.4	OR
2nd place, silver medalist(s)	Robert Foth (USA)	1169	97.6	1266.6	
3rd place, bronze medalist(s)	Ryohei Koba (JPN)	1171	94.9	1265.9	
4	Juha Hirvi (FIN)	1172	92.8	1264.8	
5	Harald Stenvaag (NOR)	1166	98.6	1264.6	
6	Rajmond Debevec (SLO)	1167	95.6	1262.6	
7	Peter Gabrielsson (SWE)	1168	93.1	1261.1	
8	Zsolt Vári (HUN)	1164	94.6	1258.6	

OR Olympic record

== Sources ==
- Games of the XXV Olympiad Barcelona 1992: The results (PDF).
