= Anita (given name) =

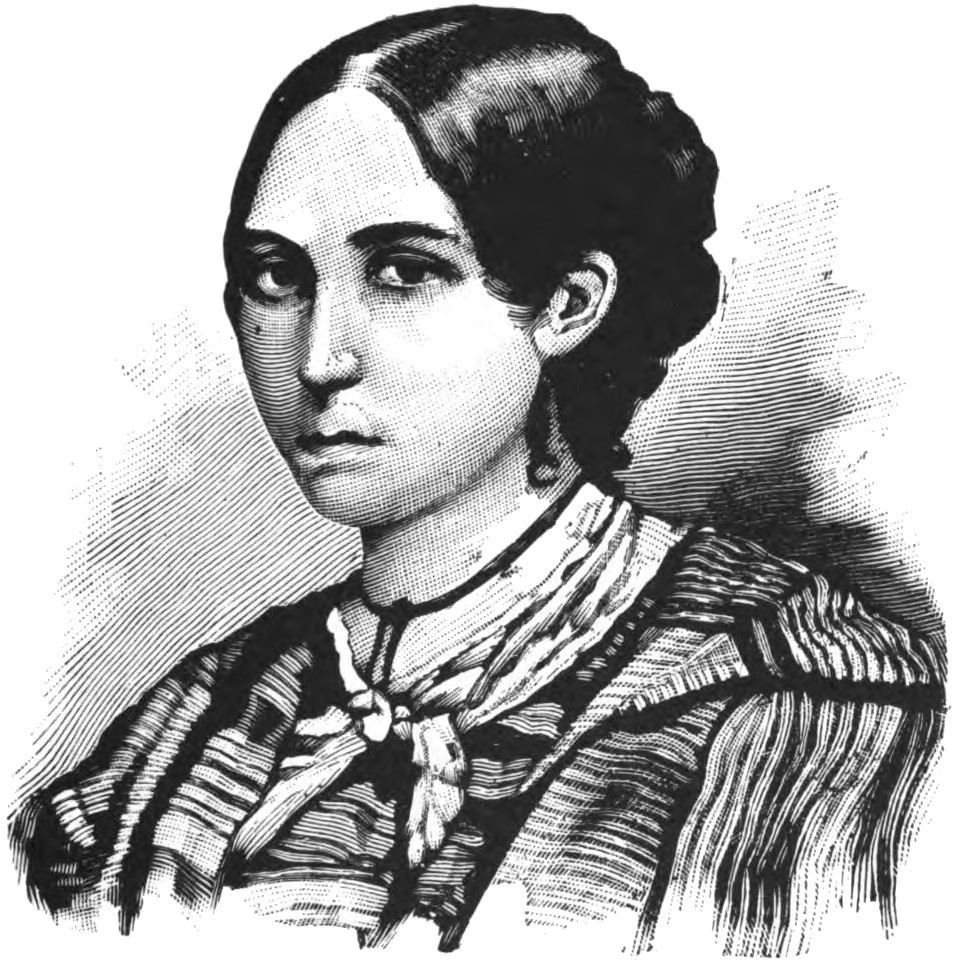
- Portrait of Anita Garibaldi, published in "Illustrious Women of Brazil"
- Pronunciation: /əˈniːtə/ ə-NEE-tə
- Gender: Female
- Language: Indo-European languages Persian Spanish Hebrew

Other names
- See also: Anitha, Ann, Anne, Ana, Anna, Anahita, Annette, Annie

Anita is a feminine given name. The name and its variants are now common worldwide, especially in regions where Indo-European languages are spoken, namely Europe, Iran, South Asia, and North America. Anita is a short form of the ancient Persian name Anahita. It is also a Spanish form of the name Anna.

== People ==
=== Given name ===
- Anita Aarons (1912–2000), Australian artist
- Anita W. Addison (1952–2004), American television and film director and producer
- Anita Agnihotri (born 1956), Indian Bengali poet and writer
- Anita Natacha Akide (born 1995), Nigerian media personality, entrepreneur and actress
- Anita Allen (disambiguation), multiple people
- Anita Alpern (1920–2006), American Internal Revenue Service official
- Anita Altman (born 1945), American entrepreneur and city planner
- Anita Alvarado (born 1972), Chilean prostitute, businesswoman and reality TV personality
- Anita Alvarez (born 1960), American government official, State's Attorney of Cook County, Illinois
- Anita Alvarez (synchronized swimmer), American, (born 1996)
- Anita Álvarez de Williams (born 1931), American anthropologist, photographer, and historian
- Anita Amankwa (born 1989), Ghanaian footballer
- Anita Amenuku (born 1985), Ghanaian footballer
- Anita Among (born 1973), Ugandan accountant, lawyer and politician
- Anita Anand (born 1967), Canadian lawyer and current Member of Parliament currently serving as Minister of National Defence
- Anita Anand (journalist) (born 1972), British radio presenter and journalist
- Anita Andersson (born 1935), Swedish swimmer
- Anita Andreassen (born 1960), Norwegian mushing competitor
- Anita Andreis, Croatian film composer
- Anita Antoinette (born 1989), American singer
- Anita Apelthun Sæle (born 1951), Norwegian politician
- Anita Arya (born 1963), Indian politician
- Anita Asante (born 1985), British footballer
- Anita Asiimwe, Rwandan politician
- Anita Auglend (born 1979), Norwegian singer
- Anita Augspurg (1857–1943), German lawyer, actor, writer, and feminist
- Anita Avramides, British philosopher
- Anita Awosusi (born 1956), German Sinti writer and civil rights activist
- Anita Ayoob (born 1970), Pakistani actress
- Anita B. Brody (born 1935), American judge
- Anita Bahn (1919/1920–1980), American epidemiologist, biostatistician and cancer researcher
- Anita Baker (New Zealand politician), Mayor of Porirua
- Anita Baker (born 1958), American R&B and soul singer and songwriter
- Anita Baranting (born 1954), Malaysian politician
- Anita Barbee, American psychologist
- Anita Barone (born 1964), American actress
- Anita Bärwirth (1918–1994), German gymnast
- Anita Basnet, Nepalese footballer
- Anita Bathe, Canadian television journalist
- Anita Bay Bundegaard (born 1963), Danish politician
- Anita Berber (1899–1928), German dancer, actress, and writer
- Anita Bergman, member of the Legislative Assembly of Saskatchewan, Canada
- Anita Bernstein (born 1961), American legal scholar
- Anita Berrizbeitia (born 1957), Venezuelan-born American landscape theorist, teacher, and writer
- Anita Beryl (born 1986), Ugandan fashion designer
- Anita Best, Canadian teacher, broadcaster, and singer
- Anita Bhadel (born 1972), Indian politician
- Anita Bhandari, Indian surgeon
- Anita Bhardwaj, Indian high-altitude rescue doctor
- Anita Bitri-Prapaniku (1968–2004), Albanian pop singer and violinist
- Anita Björk (1923–2012), Swedish actress
- Anita Blair (disambiguation), multiple people
- Anita Blanch (1910–1983), Spanish-born Mexican actress
- Anita Blay, British-Ghanaian singer-songwriter
- Anita Blaze (born 1991), French fencer
- Anita Błochowiak (born 1973), Polish politician
- Anita Bobasso (1896–1996), Argentine actress and singer
- Anita Maris Boggs (1888–1937), American economist and film distributor
- Anita Bonds, American politician
- Anita Borg (1949–2003), American computer scientist
- Anita Bose Pfaff (born 1942), Austrian economics professor, daughter of Indian politician Subhas Chandra Bose
- Anita Botnen (born 1965), Canadian gymnast
- Anita Bowser (1920–2007), American politician
- Anita Boyer (1915–1985), American Big Band singer and songwriter
- Anita Brägger (born 1972), Swiss middle-distance runner
- Anita Brandt-Burgoyne, American film editor
- Anita Decker Breckenridge (born 1978), American government official
- Anita Brenner (1905–1974), Mexican-born writer of children's literature and books on Mexican art and history
- Anita Briem (born 1982), Icelandic actress
- Anita Brodén (born 1948), Swedish Liberal People's Party politician
- Anita Brookner (1928–2016), British novelist and art historian
- Anita Patti Brown (c. 1870–1950), American singer
- Anita Bryant (1940–2024), American singer and anti-gay activist
- Anita Bulath (born 1983), Hungarian handballer
- Anita Buma, Dutch Antarctic researcher
- Anita Burdman Feferman (1927–2015), American historian of mathematics and biographer
- Anita Buri (born 1978), Swiss beauty pageant winner, crowned Miss Switzerland 1999
- Anita Burroughs, American politician
- Anita Bush (1883–1974), American stage actress and playwright
- Anita M. Cal (born 1966), American film editor
- Anita Calvert Lebourgeoise (1879–1940), American attorney, judge, genealogist, biographer, and feminist
- Anita Caprioli (born 1973), Italian theater and film actress
- Anita Carey (1948–2023), British actress
- Anita Carleton, American software engineer
- Ana Carrillo Domínguez (1898–1974), known as Anita Carrillo, communist activist and a captain in the Spanish Republican Army
- Anita Carter (1933–1999), American country and folk singer
- Anita Caspary (1915–2011), American nun, founder of Immaculate Heart of Mary Community
- Anita Cerquetti (1931–2014), Italian dramatic soprano
- Anita Chapman (born 1952), British Paralympic archer
- Anita Chernewski, American photographer
- Anita Cherry, American coal miner
- Anita Christensen (born 1972), Danish professional boxer
- Anita Chui (born 1988), Hong Kong actress
- Anita Cifra (born 1989), Hungarian handballer
- Anita H. Clayton, American researcher
- Anita Cobby (1959–1986), Australian nurse and beauty pageant winner
- Anita Cochran, American astronomer
- Anita Cochran (born 1967), American country singer, songwriter, and record producer
- Anita Colby (1914–1992), American actress and model
- Anita Scott Coleman (1890–1960), American writer
- Anita Coleman, American librarian and researcher
- Anita Conti (1899–1997), French explorer, photographer and oceanographer
- Anita Corbett, American biochemist and academic
- Anita Corbin, British photographer
- Anita Cornwell (1923–2023), American gay rights advocate
- Anita Daher, Canadian writer of juvenile and teen books
- Anita Daniel (1892–1978), Romanian-born German-American author and journalist
- Anita Darian (1927–2015), American singer and actress
- Anita Das (1953–2018), Indian film and television actress
- Anita Date-Kelkar (born 1980), Indian actress
- Anita De Bauch (born 1986), British model
- Anita de Braganza (1886–1977), American socialite and heiress
- Anita DeFrantz (born 1952), American Olympic rower
- Anita De Sosoo, Ghanaian politician
- Anita de St. Quentin (1901–?), French figure skater
- Anita Delgado (1890–1962), Spanish flamenco dancer and singer
- Anita Desai (born 1937), Indian novelist and academic
- Anita Devgan, Indian actress
- Anita Devi (born 1970), Indian politician
- Anita Devi (sport shooter) (born 1994), Indian sports shooter
- Anita Devi Sah (born 1982), Nepalese politician and professor
- Anita Diamant (born 1951), American writer
- Anita Dobson (born 1949), British television actress
- Anita Dobelli Zampetti, Italian writer, teacher and activist
- Anita Doherty (1949–2022), Bahamian athlete and philanthropist
- Anita Dolly Panek (1930–2024), Brazilian biochemist
- Anita Dongre (born 1963), Indian fashion designer
- Anita Doreen Diggs (born 1966), American editor, novelist, and lecturer
- Anita Doron (born 1974), Canadian film director and writer
- Anita Dorris (1903–1993), German actress
- Anita Doth (born 1971), Dutch singer
- Anita Douthat, American photographer
- Anita Dow, Australian politician
- Anita Dube (born 1958), Indian artist
- Anita Dunn (born 1958), American political consultant
- Anita Durante (1897–1994), Italian actress
- Anita Earls (born 1960), American judge
- Anita Ekberg (1931–2015), Swedish model and actress
- Anita Ekström (1943–2022), Swedish actress
- Anita Elberse (born 1970s), American academic
- Anita Ellis (1920–2015), Canadian-born American singer and actress
- Anita Elson (1898–1985), American dancer and singer
- Anita M. Elvidge, American artist and First Lady of Guam
- Anita Endrezze (born 1952), American writer and painter
- Anita Erskine (born 1978), Ghanaian TV and radio presenter
- Anita Fabiola (born 1994), Ugandan actress and businesswoman
- Anita Farra (1905–2008), Italian stage and film actress
- Anita Fatis (born 1963), French Paralympic swimmer
- Anita Felguth (1909–2003), German table tennis player
- Anita Fernandini de Naranjo (1902–1982), Peruvian politician
- Anita Fetz (born 1957), Swiss politician and entrepreneur
- Anita Fields, American ceramic and textile artist
- Anita Figueredo (1916–2010), Costa Rican-American surgeon and philanthropist
- Anita Finlay, American actress
- Anita Ford (born 1947), Canadian curler and coach
- Anita Fordjour, Ghanaian wheelchair racer
- Anita Foss (1921–2015), American baseball player
- Anita Frew (born 1957), Scottish businesswoman
- Anita Friedman, executive director of JFCS
- Anita Friedt, American diplomat
- Anita Gaće (born 1983), Croatian handballer
- Anita Gale, Baroness Gale (born 1940), British politician
- Anita Galić (born 1985), Croatian freestyle swimmer
- Anita Ganeri (born 1961), British writer, the Horrible Geography series
- Anita Gara (born 1983), Hungarian chess grand master
- Anita Garanča (1949–2015), Latvian singer and music teacher, mother of the famous operatic mezzo-soprano Elīna Garanča
- Anita Garbín (1915–1977), Spanish anarchist militawoman
- Anita Gargas (born 1964), Polish investigative journalist and presenter
- Anita Garibaldi (1821–1849), Brazilian-born revolutionary, wife of Giuseppe Garibaldi
- Anita Garvin (1907–1994), American actress and comedian
- Anita Kiki Gbeho, Ghanaian United Nations official
- Anita Gershman, American film producer
- Anita Ghai (born 1958), Indian academic
- Anita Ghulam Ali (1934–2014), Pakistani educator and newscaster
- Anita Gillette (born 1936), American actress
- Anita Glesta (born 1958), American artist
- Anita Goel, American physicist and physician
- Anita Gonzalez, American writer, director and educator
- Anita Görbicz (born 1983), Hungarian handball player
- Anita Gordon (1929–2015), American singer
- Anita Gradin (1933–2022), Swedish politician and ambassador
- Anita Graham (born 1948), British actress
- Anita Gregory (1925–1984), British psychologist
- Anita Greve (1905–1972), Norwegian painter
- Anita Groener (born 1958), Dutch painter
- Anita Grūbe (born 1955), Latvian actress
- Anita Grunder, American geologist
- Anita Guerreau-Jalabert, French historian and researcher
- Anita Guerreiro (1936–2025), Portuguese fado singer and actress
- Anita Guha (1932–2007), Indian film actress
- Anita Gulli (born 1998), Italian alpine skier
- Anita Gupta, Indian social entrepreneur and activist
- Anita Singh Gurjar, Indian politician
- Anita Gustafson (born 1961), American historian and academic administrator
- Anita Gutwell (1931–2022), Austrian film actress
- Anita Håkenstad (born 1968), Norwegian long-distance runner
- Anita Hagen (1931–2015), Canadian politician
- Anita Hall, American politician
- Anita Halpin (born 1944), British politician
- Anita Hansbo (born 1960), Swedish mathematician and academic administrator
- Anita Hansemann (1962–2019), Swiss social worker and writer
- Anita Harding (1952–1995), British neurologist
- Anita Harris (born 1942), British actress and singer
- Anita G. Harris (1937–2014), American geologist
- Anita Hartig, Romanian operatic soprano
- Anita Hassanandani (born 1981), Indian actress
- Anita Haynes, Trinidad and Tobago politician
- Anita Hegerland (born 1961), Norwegian singer
- Anita Hegh (born 1972), Australian actor
- Anita Heiss (born 1968), Indigenous Australian writer
- Anita Hellström (born 1940), Swedish swimmer
- Anita Florence Hemmings (1872–1960), first black student to attend Vassar College
- Anita Hendrie (1863–1940), American actress
- Anita Heringes (born 1984), Hungarian politician
- Anita Herr (born 1987), Hungarian handball player
- Anita Hill (disambiguation), multiple people
- Aníta Hinriksdóttir (born 1996), Icelandic middle-distance runner
- Anita Ho-Baillie, Australian scientist
- Anita Höfer (born 1944), German actress
- Anita Hoffman (1942–1998), American activist and writer, wife of radical Abbie Hoffman
- Anita Hoffmann (1919–2007), Mexican parasitologist and acarologist
- Anita Holdcroft (born 1947), British anaesthetist and pain researcher
- Anita Hopper, American molecular geneticist
- Anita Horvat (born 1996), Slovenian sprinter
- Anita Howard (born 1969), American sprinter
- Anita Huffington (1934–2025), American sculptor
- Anita Hugi (born 1975), Swiss author, producer, journalist, editor, filmmaker and festival director
- Anita Inder Singh, Indian international affairs analyst
- Anita Irarrázabal (born 1982), Chilean alpine skier
- Anita Irfan (born 1967), Pakistani politician
- Anita Isaacs, Canadian political scientist
- Anita Iseghohi (born 1985), Nigerian businesswoman
- Anita Jacoby, Australian film and television producer
- Anita Jatav (born 1984), Indian politician
- Anita Jeram (born 1965), English author and illustrator
- Anita Jokiel (born 1966), Polish gymnast
- Anita Jönsson (born 1947), Swedish Social Democratic politician
- Anita Johansson (disambiguation), multiple people
- Anita K. Jones (born 1942), American computer scientist and former government official
- Anita Jordán (c. 1917–1946), Argentine film and stage actress
- Anita Jose (born 1970s), Indian-born educator and business strategist
- Anita Josey-Herring (born 1960), American judge
- Anita Judd-Jenkins, American politician
- Anita Kalinde, Malawian politician
- Anita Kanter (born 1933), American tennis player ranked in World top 10
- Anita Kanwal (born 1954), Indian television actress and producer
- Anita Kanwar, Indian film and television actor
- Anita Karim (born 1996), Pakistani mixed martial arts fighter
- Anita Karlsson, Swedish sports shooter
- Anita Kaul (1954–2016), Indian politician
- Anita Raj Kaur (born 1986), Malaysian badminton player
- Anita Kazai (born 1988), Hungarian handballer
- Anita Kažemāka (born 1990), Latvian long-distance runner
- Anita Kelsey (born 1963), British singer and songwriter
- Anita Rita Kenyó (born 1981), Hungarian cyclist
- Anita Kerr (1927–2022), American singer, composer, arranger and producer
- Anita Khemka (born 1972), Indian photographer
- Anita Killi (born 1968), Norwegian animator and film director
- Anita King (1884–1963), American racecar driver, actress, and thoroughbred racehorse owner
- Anita Király (born 1971), Hungarian judoka
- Anita Klapote (born 1967), Latvian long-distance runner
- Anita Klein (born 1960), Australian-born British painter and print-maker
- Anita Klemensen (born 1977), Danish chef
- Anita Kobuß (born 1944), East German canoeist
- Anita Kossen (born 1970), Dutch softball player
- Anita Kravos (born 1974), Italian actress
- Anita Krohn Traaseth (born 1971), Norwegian business executive and author
- Anita Kulcsár (1976–2005), Hungarian handballer
- Anita Kulik (born 1964), American politician
- Anita Kuma, Ghanaian media personality
- Anita Kumari Yadav, Nepalese politician
- Anita Kuhlke (born 1947), German rower
- Anita Kunz (born 1956), Canadian-born artist and illustrator
- Anita Kurmann (1976–2015), Swiss endocrinologist and thyroid surgeon
- Anita Kwiatkowska (born 1985), Polish volleyball player
- Anita Lallande (1949–2021), Puerto Rican Olympic swimmer
- Anita Lane (1959–2021), Australian singer and songwriter
- Anita Lasker-Wallfisch (born 1925), German-born cellist and Holocaust survivor
- Anita Layton, American applied mathematician
- Anita Lee (born 1968), Hong Kong singer
- Anita Leocádia Prestes (born 1936), Brazilian historian
- Anita Lerche (born 1973), Danish singer, songwriter, and composer
- Anita Lerman (born 1944), American politician
- Anita Leslie (1914–1985), Irish biographer
- Anita Lett (c. 1871–1940), Irish activist
- Anita Liepiņa (born 1967), Latvian race walker and long-distance runner
- Anita van Lier (born 1952), Dutch cricketer
- Anita Lihme (1903–1976), American golfer and businesswoman
- Anita Linda (1924–2020), Filipino film actor
- Anita Lindblom (1937–2020), Swedish actress and singer
- Anita Lindman (1932–2018), Swedish television announcer and producer
- Anita Lipnicka (born 1975), Polish singer and songwriter
- Anita Lizana (1915–1994), Chilean tennis player
- Anita Lo, American chef and restaurateur
- Anita Lobel (born 1934), Polish-American children's illustrator
- Anita Lochner (born 1950), German film and television actress
- Anita Lonsbrough (born 1941), British swimmer
- Anita Loos (1889–1981), American screenwriter and playwright
- Anita L. Lopez, American NOAA official
- Anita Louise (1915–1970), American film actress
- Anita Louise Combe, Australian actress, singer, and dancer
- Anita Louise Suazo (born 1937), Native-American potter
- Anita Lyons Bond, American civil rights activist
- Anita Mackey (1914–2024), American social worker
- Anita Madden (1933–2018), American sportswoman
- Anita Madsen (born 1995), Danish figure skater
- Anita Magsaysay-Ho (1914–2012), Filipina painter
- Anita Mahadevan-Jansen, Indian-American biomedical engineer
- Anita Mahfood (died 1965), Jamaican musical artist
- Anita Majumdar, Canadian actress and playwright
- Anita Malfatti (1889–1964), Brazilian artist
- Anita Mančić (born 1968), Serbian actress
- Anita Mann (born 1946), American choreographer, dancer and actress
- Anita Manning (born 1947), Scottish antiques expert and television personality
- Anita Marcos (born 2000), Spanish footballer
- Anita Marks (born 1970), American football player and radio personality
- Anita Marshall, American geologist
- Anita Martínez (born 1975), Argentine actress, comedian, dancer and television host
- Anita Martinez (1925–2026), American politician
- Anita Martini (1939–1993), American journalist
- Anita Márton (born 1989), Hungarian shot putter
- Anita Mason (1942–2020), British writer
- Anita Mavi, Indian kabaddi player
- Anita McBride, American academic and former government official
- Anita McConnell (1936–2016), British scientist
- Anita McCormick Blaine, American philanthropist and political activist
- Anita McNaught (born 1965), British-born New Zealand journalist and television presenter
- Anita Mehta, Indian physicist
- Anita Meiland (born 1967), Dutch rower
- Anita Meyer (Annita Meijer, born 1954), Dutch singer
- Anita Miller (disambiguation), multiple people
- Anita Moen (born 1967), Norwegian cross-country skier
- Anita Monro, Australian academic, theologian and minister
- Anita Moorjani (born 1959), British writer
- Anita Mormand (born 1971), French sprinter
- Anita Morris (1943–1994), American actress
- Anita Mugeni (born 1970), Rwandan judge
- Anita Mui (1963–2003), Hong Kong singer and actress
- Anita Muižniece (born 1987), Latvian politician
- Anita Mulenga (born 1995), Zambian footballer
- Anita Nagar Singh Chouhan, member of the Lok Sabha
- Anita Nair (born 1966), Indian-born writer
- Anita Nall (born 1976), American Olympic swimmer
- Anita Neil (born 1950), British sprinter
- Anita Nemtin (born 1969), Hungarian equestrian
- Anita Nergaard (born 1967), Norwegian diplomat
- Anita Neville (born 1942), Canadian politician
- Anita Newcomb McGee (1864–1940), American physician
- Anita Nivala (born 1961), Canadian international lawn bowler
- Anita North (born 1963), British sport shooter
- Anita Notaro (1955–2014), Irish TV producer, director, journalist and writer
- Anita Novinsky (1922–2021), Brazilian historian
- Anita Nüßner (1935–2025), German sprint canoeist
- Anita Nyberg (born 1940), Swedish academic
- Anita Nyman (born 1971), Finnish cross-country skier
- Anita O'Day (1919–2006), American jazz singer
- Anita Ontiveros (1947–2024), Argentinian television producer
- Anita Orbán (born 1974), Hungarian politician
- Anita Orlund (born 1964), Norwegian Labour Party politician
- Anita Ortega, Puerto Rican basketball player
- Anita Osikweme Osikhena, Nigerian actress, singer and model
- Anita Østby (born 1972), Norwegian Liberal Party politician
- Anita Östlund (born 2001), Swedish figure skater
- Anita Otto (1942–2019), German discus thrower
- Anita Owen, American songwriter
- Anita Pádár (born 1979), Hungarian footballer
- Anita Padilla, American television journalist
- Anita Page (1910–2008), American film actress
- Anita Paillamil, Mapuche textile artist
- Anita Palermo Kelly (1913–1990), American politician
- Anita Pallenberg (1942–2017), Italian-born actress, model, and fashion designer
- Annita Pania (born 1970), Greek television hostess
- Anita Parkhurst Willcox (1892–1984), American artist, feminist, and pacifist
- Anita Peabody (1925–1934), American racehorse
- Anita Pendo (born 1986), Rwandan journalist
- Anita Perez Ferguson (born 1949), American speaker, consultant, and writer
- Anita Perras (born 1960), Canadian country singer
- Anita Thigpen Perry (born 1952), American healthcare advocate and First Lady of Texas (2000–2015)
- Anita Pichler (1948–1997), Italian author and translator
- Anita Phillips (1945–2023), Australian politician
- Anita Pijpelink (born 1974), Dutch politician
- Anita Pinczi (born 1993), Hungarian footballer
- Anita Pipan, Slovenian diplomat
- Anita Pistone (born 1976), Italian runner
- Anita Pocrnić-Radošević (born 1973), Croatian politician
- Anita Pointer (1948–2022), American R&B/soul singer and songwriter, member of The Pointer Sisters
- Anita Pollitzer (1894–1975), American photographer
- Anita Porchet (born 1961), Swiss watch enameller
- Anita Potocskáné Kőrösi (born 1981), Hungarian politician
- Anita Pratap (born 1958), Indian writer and journalist
- Anita J. Prazmowska (born 1950), British academic
- Anita Prime, New Zealand singer-songwriter
- Anita Protti (born 1964), Swiss track and field athlete
- Anita Punt (born 1987), New Zealand field hockey player
- Anita Rachlis, Canadian AIDS researcher
- Anita Rachvelishvili (born 1984), Georgian operatic mezzo-sopran
- Anita Raj (born 1963), Indian actress
- Anita Raj (academic) (born 1970), American psychologist
- Anita Raja (born 1953), Italian translator and writer
- Anita Singh Rajput, Indian politician
- Anita Ramasastry, American academic
- Anita Ramos Camba (born 1979), Filipino television director
- Anita Rani (born 1977), British radio and television presenter and journalist
- Anita Rapp (born 1977), Norwegian footballer
- Anita Ratnam (born 1954), Indian dancer and choreographer
- Anita Rau Badami (born 1961), Indian-born Canadian writer
- Anita Reddy, Indian social worker
- Anita Rée (1885–1933), German artist
- Anita Reeves (1948–2016), Irish actress
- Anita Renfroe (born 1962), American comedian
- Anita Rivas (born 1972), Ecuadorian politician
- Anita Rizzuti (born 1971), Norwegian snooker player
- Anita Roberts (1942–2006), American molecular biologist
- Anita Rocha da Silveira (born 1985), Brazilian film director and screenwriter
- Anita Roddick (1942–2007), British businesswoman, founder of The Body Shop
- Anita Rodriguez, American painter
- Anita Rollin (born c. 1981), Sri Lankan snowboarder
- Anita Rosenberg, American director of eighties cult films
- Anita Rossing-Brown (born 1960), Swedish diver
- Anita Rummelhoff (1935–1997), Norwegian actress
- Anita Apelthun Sæle (born 1951), Norwegian politician
- Anita Sanders (1942–2023), Swedish actress and model
- Anita Sarawak (born 1952), Singaporean-born singer
- Anita Sarkeesian (born 1983), Canadian-American feminist
- Anita Sarko (c. 1947–2015), American musician and journalist
- Anita Šauerová (born 1963), Czech gymnast
- Anita Schäfer (born 1951), German politician
- Anita Schätzle (born 1981), German freestyle wrestler
- Anita Schöbel (born 1969), German mathematician
- Anita Schjøll Brede (born 1985), Norwegian entrepreneur
- Anita Schug, Rohingya refugee, doctor and humanitarian
- Anita Schwaller (born 1975), Swiss snowboarder
- Anita Sengupta, American aerospace engineer
- Anita Seppilli (1902–1992), Italian cultural anthropologist
- Anita Serogina (born 1990), Ukrainian karateka
- Anita Sethi, British journalist and writer
- Anita Shapira (born 1940), Israeli historian
- Anita Sharma (dancer) (born 1969), Indian Sattriya dancer
- Anita Sharp-Bolster (1895–1985), Irish actress
- Anita Sheoran (born 1984), Indian freestyle wrestler
- Anita Shrestha, Nepalese sports shooter
- Anita Shreve (1946–2018), American writer
- Anita Sidén (born 1940), Swedish Moderate Party politician
- Anita Silsby, American taekwondo practitioner
- Anita Silvers (1940–2019), American philosopher
- Anita Silvey (born 1947), American editor and literary critic
- Anita Simoncini (born 1999), Sammarinese singer
- Anita Simonis (1926–2011), American gymnast
- Anita Singhvi (born 1964), Indian classical singer
- Anita Sirgo (1930–2024), Spanish activist
- Anita Skorgan (born 1958), Norwegian singer and songwriter
- Anita Sleeman (1930–2011), Canadian composer
- Anita Smits (born 1967), Dutch archer
- Anita Snellman (1924–2006), Finnish painter
- Anita Sobočan (born 1997), Slovenian volleyball player
- Anita Soina (born 1999), Kenyan environmentalist
- Anita Sokołowska (born 1976), Polish actress
- Anita Somani, American politician
- Anita Sood (born 1966), Indian swimmer
- Anita Sowińska (born 1973), Polish politician
- Anita Socola Specht (1871–1958), American composer and musician
- Anita Spinelli (1908–2010), Swiss artist, painter and drawer
- Anita Spring (born 1965), Australian beach volleyball player
- Anita Stansfield (born 1961), American writer
- Anita Staps (born 1961), Dutch judoka
- Anita Steckel (1930–2012), American feminist artist
- Anita Stenberg (born 1992), Norwegian cyclist
- Anita Stevenson, British table tennis player
- Anita Stewart (1895–1961), American actress and film producer
- Anita Stewart (culinary author) (1947–2020), Canadian culinary writer and food activist
- Anita Straker, British mathematics educator
- Anita Strindberg (born 1937), Italian actress
- Anita Stukāne (born 1954), Latvian high jumper
- Anita Subhadarshini, member of the Lok Sabha
- Anita Summers (1925–2023), American educator
- Anita Superson, American professor of philosophy
- Anita Tack (born 1951), German politician
- Anita Takura, Ghanaian academic
- Anita Mai Tan, Canadian jewelry designer
- Anita Tefkin (1932–2016), American pair skater
- Anita Thallaug (1938–2023), Norwegian actor and singer
- Anita Thapar, Welsh child psychiatrist
- Anita Thompson (disambiguation), multiple people
- Anita Tijoux (born 1977), French-born Chilean hip-hop musician
- Anita Tóth (born 1979), Hungarian sport shooter
- Anita Tomulevski (born 1977), Norwegian gymnast and athletics competitor
- Anita Traversi (1937–1991), Swiss singer
- Anita Trumpe (born 1968), Latvian hurdler
- Anita Tsoy (born 1971), Russian singer
- Anita Turner (born 1972), British script editor and television producer
- Anita Turpeau Anderson (1903–1996), American pianist
- Anita Udeep, Indian film director
- Anita Ukah (born 1995), Nigerian model
- Anita Ušacka (born 1952), Latvian judge and academic
- Anita Utseth (born 1966), Norwegian engineer and politician
- Anita Uwagbale (born 1976, now Anita Iseghohi), Nigerian beauty queen and model
- Anita Välkki (1926–2011), Finnish opera singer
- Anita Váczi (born 1986), Hungarian para-canoeist
- Anita Valen (born 1968), Norwegian cyclist
- Anita Valencia (born 1932), American visual artist
- Anita Vandenbeld (born 1971), Canadian politician
- Anita Weiß (born 1955), German middle-distance runner
- Anita Włodarczyk (born 1985), Polish hammer thrower
- Anita Wörner (born 1942), German middle-distance runner
- Anita Waage (born 1971), Norwegian footballer
- Anita Wachter (born 1967), Austrian alpine skier
- Anita Wagner (born 1960), Austrian singer
- Anita Wagner (born 1994), Bosnian tennis player
- Anita Wall (born 1940), Swedish actress
- Anita Ward (born 1956), American singer
- Anita Wardell (born 1961), British jazz musician and music educator
- Anita Wawatai (born 1980), New Zealand field hockey player
- Anita Werner (born 1978), Polish television journalist
- Anita Weschler, American artist
- Anita West (born 1935), British actress and television presenter
- Anita Wetzel, American artist
- Anita Weyermann (born 1977), Swiss middle-distance runner
- Anita Whitney (1867–1955), American political activist
- Anita Willets-Burnham (1880–1958), American painter
- Anita L. Wills, American author and historian
- Anita Wilson (born 1976), American musical artist
- Anita Wilson (archivist), archivist for Tuvalu, Hong Kong and the British royal family
- Anita Wiredu-Minta (born 1983), Ghanaian football manager and former footballer
- Anita Wood (1937–2023), American television performer
- Anita Woodley, American dramatist
- Anita Woolfolk Hoy (born 1947), American psychologist
- Anita Wreford, New Zealand applied economist
- Anita Yadav (born 1964), Indian politician
- Anita Yeckel (1942–2015), American politician
- Anita Yuen (born 1971), Hong Kong actress
- Anita Yusof, first Malaysian woman to motorcycle
- Anita Zabludowicz, British art collector and gallery owner
- Anita Zagaria (born 1954), Italian actress
- Anita Zaidi, Pakistani physician
- Anita Zarnowiecki (born 1954), Swedish swimmer
- Anita Žnidaršic (born 1996), Slovenian cyclist
- Anita Zucker (born 1951/1952), American businesswoman, first female Governor of the Hudson's Bay Company
- Gurmayum Anita Devi, Indian mountaineer
- J. Anita Stup (born 1945), American politician
- Jagat and Anita Nanjappa, Indian race-car drivers
- Princess Anita of Orange-Nassau (born 1969), Dutch royal

=== Fictional characters ===
- Anita Blake, the protagonist of Laurell K. Hamilton's novel series Anita Blake: Vampire Hunter
- Anita (Darkstalkers), a video game character in Night Warriors: Darkstalkers' Revenge
- Anita Hailey (Shiho Miyano), a character in the manga/anime Case Closed
- Anita Santos, character on the ABC daytime drama All My Children
- Anita Barnes, a character from the film The Butterfly Effect 3: Revelations played by Chantel Giacalone
- Anita Knight, from The Secret Show
- Anita Van Buren, character on the television crime drama Law & Order portrayed by S. Epatha Merkerson
- Anita, a comic book character in the works of Italian artist Guido Crepax
- Anita, a character in the musical West Side Story
- Anita Bircham, a character from Sleepaway Camp III: Teenage Wasteland portrayed by Sonya Maddox
- Anita, a recurring character in the British sit-com Dinnerladies
- Anita "Needy" Lesnicki, a character in the black comedy horror film Jennifer's Body
- Anita, a girlfriend character in Need for Speed
- Anita Radcliffe, character in Disney's animated film 101 Dalmatians
- Anita, a character in the anime Hunter × Hunter episode 11
- Anita Robb, a character in the film Friday the 13th: A New Beginning played by Jere Fields
- Anita is the middle name of American Dad! character Steve Smith

== See also ==
- Anita (disambiguation)
- Amita
- Anahita
- Annette (disambiguation)
- Anna (given name)
- Annie (given name)
- Anya
- Annika (given name)
