= Ontiveros =

Ontiveros may refer to:

- Anita Ontiveros (1947–2024), Argentinian television producer
- Javier Ontiveros, Spanish soccer player
- Karin Ontiveros, Mexican model and beauty pageant titleholder
- Lupe Ontiveros, Mexican-American film and television actress
- Omar Ontiveros, American soccer player
- Raúl Meza Ontiveros, Mexican suspected drug lord
- Steve Ontiveros (disambiguation)
  - Steve Ontiveros (infielder) (born 1951), Major League Baseball player
  - Steve Ontiveros (pitcher) (born 1961), Major League Baseball player

== See also ==
- Fontiveros, a Spanish municipality

The last name ¨Ontiveros¨ can have different spellings such as: Hontiverios, Ontiver, Ontivero. It has a spanish origin.
