= Pipan =

Pipan is a surname. Notable people with the surname include:

- Aleš Pipan (born 1959), Slovene basketball coach
- Anita Pipan (born 1970), Slovene diplomat
- Dominika Švarc Pipan (born 1978), Slovene politician
