= LeBourgeois =

LeBourgeois or Lebourgeois is a surname. Another spelling is Le Bourgeois. Notable people with the surname include:

- Armand-François Le Bourgeois (1911–2005), French bishop
- Julien J. LeBourgeois (1923–2012), American admiral
- Michael Le Bourgeois (born 1990), English rugby union player
- Robert Le Bourgeois (born 1969), French politician
- Yvan Lebourgeois (born 1962), French footballer

== See also ==
- Anita Calvert Lebourgeoise (1879–1940), American attorney, judge, genealogist, biographer, and women's suffrage orator
- Le Bourgeois gentilhomme
- Les Bourgeois
