= Rachlis =

Surname list

Rachlis is a surname. Notable people with the surname include:

- Anita Rachlis, Canadian HIV/AIDS researcher
- Kit Rachlis, American journalist and editor
