= Anita Monro =

Australian academic, theologian and minister

- Born: Anita Monro

Academic background
- Education: Griffith University
- Thesis: Subjecting ambiguity : towards a poststructuralist feminist theological methodology (1998)
- Doctoral advisor: Elaine Wainwright

Anita Monro is an Australian academic, theologian, and Uniting Church in Australia minister. She is a former principal of Grace College, located on the St Lucia campus. She is also an Honorary Senior Fellow, in the School of Historical and Philosophical Inquiry, Faculty of Humanities, Arts and Social Sciences, at the University of Queensland.

== Early life and education ==
Monro completed a Bachelor of Arts at the University of Queensland, a Bachelor of Letters (Honours) at Deakin University, a Bachelor of Theology from the Brisbane College of Theology, and a Doctor of Philosophy at Griffith University in 1999. Her doctoral thesis, based on the work of French philosopher Julia Kristeva was titled, Subjecting ambiguity: towards a poststructuralist feminist theological methodology. Her doctoral supervisor was Australian theologian Elaine Wainwright.

== Career ==
Monro has taught in the disciplines of Biblical Studies (Hermeneutics), Systematic Theology, Practical Theology (Liturgy) and Philosophy at Brisbane College of Theology, Sydney College of Divinity, and United Theological College (Sydney) (2003–2009), which was affiliated with Charles Sturt University (School of Theology).

Monro has published in the areas of Christian theology, public worship and feminist theology, with a particular focus on the Australian context.

Monro is a Minister of the Word in the Uniting Church in Australia, and was ordained on 10 December 1988. She has served congregations in both Queensland and New South Wales. She has also served on National Working Groups on Worship and Doctrine and Gospel and Gender. She contributed to the Uniting Church's worship book, Uniting in Worship 2, published in 2005. In 2012, she was a candidate for president elect for the Uniting Church in Australia.

Monro has been a member of the four-person editorial collective for the Seachanges journal since its inception.

In addition to being an Honorary Senior Fellow at the University of Queensland, Monro was the Principal of Grace College, a residential college, which has links to the Uniting Church, the Presbyterian Church and the University of Queensland.

== Selected works ==
=== Books ===
- Stephen Burns and Anita Monro eds. (2015). Public theology and the challenge of feminism. Gender, theology, and spirituality, Abingdon, Oxon, United Kingdom: Routledge. doi:10.4324/9781315744223
- Stephen Burns and Anita Monro eds. (2009). Christian worship in Australia: inculturating the liturgical tradition. Strathfield, NSW, Australia: St Pauls Publications. ISBN 9781921472107
- Monro, Anita (2006). Resurrecting erotic transgression: subjecting ambiguity in theology. London & Oakville: Equinox Publishing. ISBN 9781845531034

=== Book chapters ===
- Monro, Anita J. (2021). A Kaleidoscopic Vessel Sailing on a Kyriarchal Ocean: The Third Wave Feminist Theologies of Women-Church (1987–2007). In: Theological and Hermeneutical Explorations from Australia: Horizons of Contextuality. (pp. 25–42) edited by Jione Havea. Lanham, Maryland, United States: The Rowman & Littlefield Publishing. ISBN 9781978703063
- Monro, Anita (2020). Grace-fully engaging young adults. In: Open and relational leadership: leading with love. (pp. 225–229) edited by Roland Hearn, Sheri D. Kling and Thomas Jay Oord. Grasmere, ID, United States: SacraSage Press. ISBN 9781948609227
- Ayre, Clive W., Bookless, Dave, Geyer, Colleen, Monro, Anita and Reichardt, David (2016). Ecology and service (Diakonia): Putting words into action. In: The Church in God's Household: Protestant Perspectives on Ecclesiology and Ecology. (pp. 54–74) edited by Clive W. Ayre and Ernst M. Conradie. Pietermaritzburg, South Africa: Cluster Publications. ISBN 9781920620141
- Burns, Stephen and Monro, Anita (2015). Which public?: inspecting the house of public theology. In: Public theology and the challenge of feminism. (pp. 1–14) edited by Stephen Burns and Anita Monro. Abingdon, Oxon, United Kingdom: Routledge. doi:10.4324/9781315744223-1 ISBN 9781844658008
- Monro, Anita (2014). A thin piercing lament: the call of God to Elijah in/to/for community. In: Witness the Glory of God in the face of Jesus Christ: papers in honour of Dean Drayton. (pp. 162–172) edited by Christopher C. Walker. Unley, SA, Australia: MediaCom Education. ISBN 9781921945304
- Monro, Anita (2014). Of frogs, eels, women, and pelicans: the myth of Tiddalik and the importance of ambiguity in baptismal identity for the contemporary Christian church. In: Worship and Culture: Foreign Country or Homeland?. (pp. 320–334) edited by Gláucia Vasconcelos Wilkey. Grand Rapids, MI, United States: Wm. B. Eerdmans Publishing. ISBN 9780802871589
- Monro, Anita (2010). 'And ain’t I a woman': the phronetic dramaturgy of feeding the family. In: Presiding Like A Woman. (pp. 123–132) edited by Nicola Slee and Stephen Burns. London UK: SPCK Publishing. ISBN 9780281061860
- Monro, Anita (2010). Pursuing feminist research: perspectives and methodologies. In: Researching practice: a discourse on qualitative methodologies. (pp. 289–298) edited by Joy Higgs, Nita Cherry, Rob Macklin and Rola Ajjawi. Rotterdam, The Netherlands: Sense Publishers. ISBN 9789460911811
- Monro, Anita (2001) When the "Good" is Not Enough: The Jouissance of Watching/Reading from/for the Subjection of Ambiguity, In: Biezeveld, Kune, and Anne-Claire Mulder. In: Towards a Different Transcendence : Feminist Findings on Subjectivity, Religion, and Values. Religions and Discourse, V. 9. Oxford: P. Lang, 2001. ISBN 9783906765662

=== Journal articles ===
- Monro, Anita (2017). :It's such a shame you're not in a Congregation!": Reclaiming the Ordered Ministry of the Word in the Uniting Church. Uniting Church Studies, 21 (1), 31-38. espace.library.uq.edu.au/view/UQ:722866
- Monro, Anita (2014). Experiencing good worship?. Liturgy, 29 (2), 9-13. doi:10.1080/0458063X.2014.867135
- Monro, Anita and Somasundram, Drene (2013). "Thirdspace’ engenders theological education." The International Journal of Religion and Spirituality in Society, 2 (3), 55-68. doi:10.18848/2154-8633/cgp/v02i03/51007
- Monro, Anita (2010). "A View from the Antipodes. Juxtaposing dingo and baby: a consideration of the cycle of light in the Australian summer." Studia Liturgica, 40 (1–2), 94–101. doi:10.1177/0039320710040001-206
- Monro, A (2001). "Deconstruction, feminist theology, and the problem of difference: Subverting the race/gender divide". Australian Feminist Studies, 16 (35), 254–255. espace.library.uq.edu.au/view/UQ:d1f8f95
