= Anita Hill (disambiguation) =

Anita Hill (born 1956) is an American law professor and accuser of Clarence Thomas.

Anita Hill may also refer to:

- Anita C. Hill (born 1951), American Lutheran minister
- Anita Hill (researcher), Australian researcher in materials and process engineering
- Anita Hill (swimmer), see Swimming at the 1982 World Aquatics Championships – Women's 100 metre freestyle
