= Anita Corbin =

British photographer

Anita Corbin (born 1958) is a British photographer. Her collections and exhibitions include Visible Girls (1981) and First Women UK (2018).

The National Portrait Gallery holds eight of her works.
