= Anita Chernewski =

American photographer

Anita Chernewski (born 1946) is an American photographer.

Her work is included in the collections of the Museum of Fine Arts Houston, the Getty Museum, and the Brooklyn Museum, New York.
