= Anita Pichler =

Italian author and translator

Anita Pichler (28 January 1948 – 6 April 1997) was an Italian author and translator from South Tyrol who wrote in German. She was the first post-war author to achieve visibility outside that region.

== Life ==
Pichler was born in Schenna and grew up in Schenna, Sulden and Trieste. She went on to study modern languages and literature at the Ca' Foscari University of Venice and Slavic studies in Prague. She received a scholarship to attend Humboldt University in East Berlin in 1979. In 1982, Pichler returned to Venice, where she was a lecturer for German at the Ca' Foscari University.

She started writing in the 1960, but did not write anything between 1969 and 1978, which she later explained by lack of time. In 1986, Pichler published her first story Die Zaunreiterin. It was published by Suhrkamp Verlag and became the first piece by a modern South Tyrolean author published by a major German publishing house. Originally, the title was Haga Zussa, however, the publishers thought it would be selling worse, and convinced Pichler to change the title. The story was republished post-mortem in 2004 as Haga Zussa. Die Zaunreiterin was noticed and commented on in German and Austrian media, including, for example, Marcel Reich-Ranicki.

In the 1990s, Pichler was able to devote more time to writing due to Austrian and Swiss fellowships she received. From 1991 to 1992, she was author in residence for the town of Biel/Bienne and, in 1994, was official author for Innervillgraten.

She moved to Bolzano in 1995 after becoming ill and died there two years later at the age of 49.

In 2002, she was portrayed in the film Anita Pichler - Ich will einfach erzählen.

== Selected work ==
=== Writing ===
- Die Zaunreiterin (Suhrkamp, 1986)
  Republished as Haga Zussa (Haymon, 2004)
- Wie die Monate das Jahr. Suhrkamp, narrative (1989)
- Die Frauen aus Fanis (1992)
- Beider Augen Blick. Neun Variationen über das Sehen (1995)
- Flatterlicht. Verstreute und unveröffentlichte Texte, post-mortem (2007)

=== Translations (from Italian to German) ===
- Über das Innehalten auf einem Feldweg by Hans Kitzmüller (1993)
- Die Steine von Pantalica by Vincenzo Consolo (1995)
