= Anita Dolly Panek =

Brazilian biochemist

Anita Dolly Haubenstock Panek (September 1, 1930 – March 27, 2024) was a Polish-born Brazilian biochemist and professor. She received a B.Sc. in Chemistry, 1954 and a Ph.D. in 1962. She became a professor at the Federal University of Rio de Janeiro, where she conducted research on the metabolism of the sugar trehalose.

In 1988 she showed that endogenous trehalose protects cells against the damage caused by freezing. In 1996, she was awarded the National Order of Scientific Merit.

== Memberships ==
- Brazilian Academy of Sciences, Rio de Janeiro, Brazil, 1986.
- Latin American Academy of Sciences, Caracas, Venezuela, 1989.
- Third World Academy of Sciences, 1989.
