= Anita Tack =

German politician (born 1951)

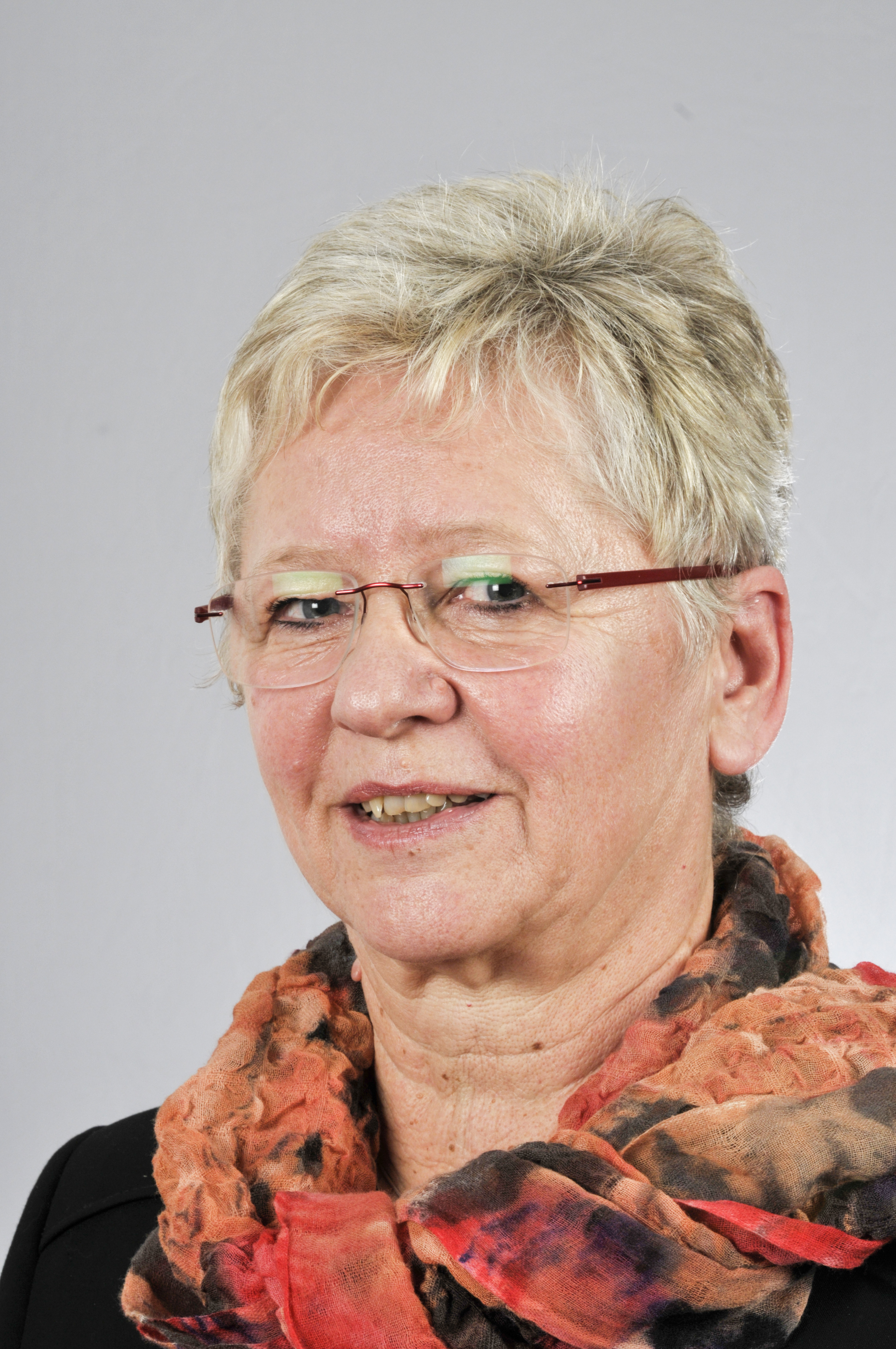
- Tack in 2016

Member of the Landtag of Brandenburg
- In office 1994–2019

Personal details
- Born: 4 April 1951 (age 75) Dresden, East Germany
- Party: PDS (since 1990); SED (1969–1990)
- Children: 2
- Education: Bauhaus University, Weimar

Anita Tack (born 4 April 1951 in Dresden, East Germany) is a German politician who is a member of Die Linke. From 2009 to 2014, she was the Minister of the Environment, Health, and Consumer Protection for the state of Brandenburg. Since 1994, she has been a member of the Landtag of Brandenburg.

== Biographical details ==
In 1969, Tack began studying city building and territory planning at the Bauhaus University in Weimar. She finished her studies in 1973. From this point, until 1987, she worked in the Bureau for Territorial Planning of Bezirk Potsdam. In 1987, she became the deputy chairman of the State Planning Commission in Potsdam. From 1990 to 1991 she worked as an employee of the district administration authority of Potsdam. From 1991 to 1994, she was the deputy leader of the office of the Party of Democratic Socialism (PDS) faction in the Landtag of Brandenburg. Tack has two children.

== Political career ==
In 1969, Tack joined the Socialist Unity Party of Germany (SED), the ruling party in East Germany. In 1990, after German reunification, she became a member of the PDS, the SED's successor party. From 1990 to 1997, she was also a member of the state leadership of the PDS and deputy state chairman and from 1999 to 2001, she was the state chairman of the party. In 1994, she became a member of the Landtag of Brandenburg in the 2nd voting period, acting as regional and traffic-political spokeswoman for the PDS faction, as well as chairing the Committee on Urban Development, Housing and Transport. In addition, she was a deputy member of the Environment Committee. In the 3rd voting period, from 1999, she was a member of the state parliament and a member of the main committee, as well as a regional and traffic policy spokesperson for the PDS faction and a member of the Committee on Urban Development, Housing, and Transport. In the Landtag election of 2004, she was elected to the 4th Landtag of Brandenburg through her party's state list.

After the Landtag election of 2009 and the following government change, from November 2009 until the year 2014, she was the Minister of the Environment, Health, and Consumer Protection in the third cabinet of Matthias Platzeck.

For the Landtag election of 2014, she was a candidate in the Potsdam I electoral district. In the 6th voting period, she was the Speaker of her faction for city development, construction, housing, and traffic. She worked as deputy chairman of the Committee for Infrastructure and Regional Planning and is a member of the Committee for Budgetary Control.

She retired from politics at the end of her term on 30 September 2019.
