= Grace College, University of Queensland =

Grace College
- The University of Queensland
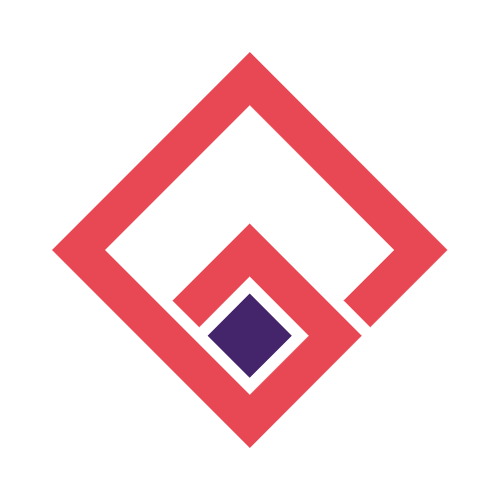
- Location: 27.49746°S 153.00708°E
- Motto in English: My Grace is Sufficient (2 Cor. 12:9)
- Established: 1970
- Gender: Gender Inclusive
- Principal: Peter Walker
- President: Matthew Simmons (2026)
- Residents: 177
- Website: www.grace.uq.edu.au

Grace College is a residential college for tertiary students located on the St Lucia Campus of The University of Queensland. During the Autumn (Semester 1; February to June) and Spring (Semester 2; July to November) semesters of The University of Queensland, the College provides catered accommodation with community development services for its student residents. Outside of these normal operating times, the College is available for short stays and conferences (both catered and non-catered). Short stays may be available during the Academic Year depending on room availability.

== Governance ==
The College operates under the auspices of the Uniting Church in Australia (Queensland Synod) and the Presbyterian Church of Queensland.

It is governed by the College Council whose membership is appointed as follows:

- 6 members appointed by The Uniting Church in Australia (Queensland Synod) through its Schools' and Residential Colleges' Commission;
- 3 members appointed by Assembly of The Presbyterian Church of Queensland;
- 1 member appointed by the Senate of The University of Queensland;
- 2 members who are current residents appointed by the Grace College Student Club;
- 3 members who are Alumnae and appointed by the Council; and
- the Principal of the College who is a non-voting member.

The key officers (Chairperson, Secretary and Treasurer) of the College Council are incorporated by Letters Patent under the Religious, Educational and Charitable Institutions Act (Qld) 1861–1977.

== History ==
The College was opened in 1970 as a women's college. In 2022, it became gender inclusive.

== Motto ==
The motto of the College is "My grace is sufficient" (2 Corinthians 12:9).

== Coat of arms ==
The College coat of arms consists of a purple passion cross fleury (a cross with fleur-de-lis ends on its arms and a lengthened lower arm) on a silver lozenge (diamond-shape) on a red shield.

== Mascot ==
The mascot of the College is the mythological Phoenix.

== Other Relationships ==
Through the Grace College Student Club, the College participates in the Inter-College Council formed by the students of the 10 residential colleges on the St Lucia campus of The University of Queensland.
