= Anita Kossen =

Dutch softball player (born 1970)

Personal information
- Nationality: Dutch
- Born: 29 December 1970 (age 55) Haarlem, Netherlands

Sport
- Sport: Softball

Anita Kossen (born 29 December 1970) is a Dutch softball player. She competed in the women's tournament at the 1996 Summer Olympics.
