= Anita Asiimwe =

Rwandan politician

Dr. Anita Asiimwe
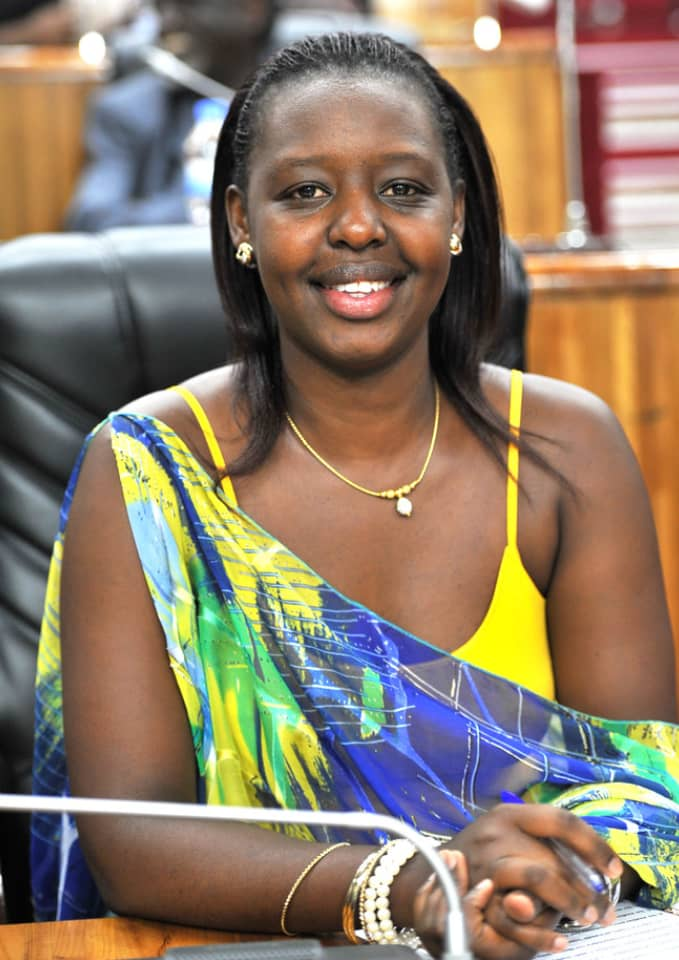
- Born: Uganda
- Education: National University of Rwanda/Dundee University, UK
- Occupations: Chief of Party, Minister of State, Medical Doctor
- Known for: Public Health

Anita Asiimwe is a Rwandan public health expert with more than 20 years of experience as a leader in the country’s healthcare sector. She has served as a board member at the Global Fund, contributing to global health strategies. She is a former Minister of State in the Rwandan Ministry of Health. Since 2023 she has served as Management Sciences for Health’s Chief of Party of the USAID Ireme Activity.

== Career ==
Dr. Asiimwe is a medical doctor and holds a master’s in public health from the University of Dundee in the United Kingdom.

From 2005 to 2013, she, along with her colleagues, spearheaded the creation of new agencies and co-led existing ones responsible for setting strategies in various infectious disease areas and non-communicable diseases (NCDs) in Rwanda. These agencies included the Treatment and Research AIDS Centre, the National AIDS Control Commission, and the Rwanda Biomedical Centre (RBC).

In February 2013, she was sworn in as Minister of State in charge of Public Health and Primary Health Care. During her tenure, she led efforts to build a strong, people-centered health system, promoting the delivery of preventive, curative, and rehabilitative health services.

From October 2017, Dr. Asiimwe served as the Coordinator for the National Early Childhood Development Program, where she led the development and implementation of national early childhood development strategies and oversaw its transition to the Rwanda National Child Development Agency, where she served as Director General until July 2021. During this tenure, Dr Asiimwe was designated as the Government of Rwanda Human Capital Development focal point, through which she played a key role in enhancing multi-sectoral collaboration across sectors. Dr. Asiimwe joined Management Sciences for Health in 2023 as the Chief of Party for the USAID Ireme Activity, a health system strengthening initiative in Rwanda.

Dr. Asiimwe served as a Global Fund Board member representing the Eastern and Southern Africa Constituency and Vice-Chair of the Global Fund Board Strategy, Investment, and Impact Committee. She is a founding member and former Board member of the Africa Constituency Bureau, which supports African leadership in advocating for increased resources and ensuring meaningful African participation in global health discussions at the Global Fund to fight HIV and AIDS, TB and malaria.
