= Anita Pendo =

Rwandan journalist (born 1986)

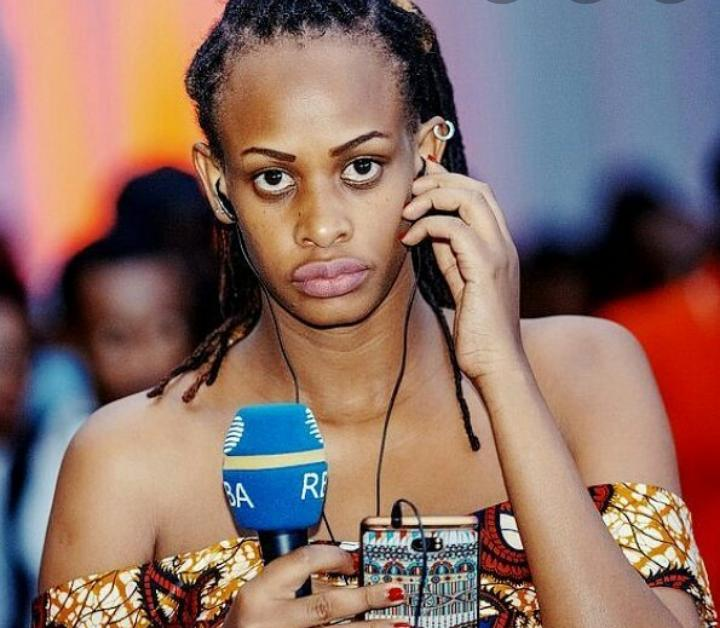
- Born: February 14 1986; Mengo,Kampala
- Citizenship: Rwandan
- Education: Mount Kenya University
- Parents: Syprien Mpabuka (father); Apophia Mukampabuka (mother)

Anita Pendo (born February 14, 1986 (age 40) in Kampala), Uganda to Syprien Mpabuka and Apophia Mukampabuka) is a Rwandan journalist, actress, mc and deejay. She used to emcee different music festivals include Primus Guma Guma Super Star prepared by Bralirwa Brewery Company.

== Early life and education ==
Pendo was born in 1986 in Mengo, Uganda, where she lived with her family. In the eighth month of 1994, she and her family returned to Rwanda. Pendo is the first born of seven children born to parents Syprien Mpabuka and Apophia Mukampabuka. She learned to take responsibility when she lost his father when she was young; he was raised by his mother but lived with her grandmother. Pendo has two sons born to Ndanda Alphonse. Those children who started learning football at the Dream team football academy led by Gimmy Mulisa, who used to play for Apr FC and the Amavubi national team.

She obtained in 2014 a bachelor's degree in journalism from Mount Kenya University.

== Career ==
She started journalism career in 2007. Pendo is now a professional reporter for RBA, who also works as an MC, as well as a dancer. She got inspiration from his family to join journalism as her career. She won as Best African female radio presenter in 2024.
