= Anita Huffington =

American sculptor (1934–2025)

Anita Huffington (December 25, 1934 – March 15, 2025) was an American sculptor noted for her stone and Bronze representation of the female torso.

== Biography ==
La Mediterranee

Anita Huffington was born in Baltimore in 1934. She majored in dance, drama, and art at the University of North Carolina before moving to New York City to study dance with Martha Graham and Merce Cunningham. She eventually gravitated towards the visual arts and joined a circle of artists from the New York School that included Willem de Kooning, Franz Kline, and Philip Guston. She returned to school, studying art at Bennington College and the University of South Florida before returning to New York's City College, where she earned her Bachelor and Master of Fine Arts degrees.

A first marriage ended in divorce, but produced a daughter named Lisa. In 1964, she married Hank Sutter, and they lived in New York until 1977 when they felt the need for change. Seeking solitude and contemplation, they found an old log cabin in the Ozark Mountains near Winslow, Arkansas, and spent a year working to restore it and build a studio for Huffington's art, christening their refuge "Arkady." Lisa joined them in the Ozarks and occasionally worked as a model, while her husband learned to produce molds for her bronzes. In 1982, Huffington was devastated when Lisa was killed in a drunk driving crash, a tragedy which informed her art in years to come. Sutter died in 2006, and in 2015, she moved to Augusta, Georgia to be with and care for her dear longtime friend Philip Morsberger. After Morsberger's death in 2021, Huffington returned to Northwest Arkansas where she lived until her death on March 15, 2025.

While Huffington remains, as art critic Amei Wallach put it, "shockingly under-recognized," she garnered numerous honors and accolades for her work. She was recognized with a fellowship by the Arkansas Arts Council in 1992; with a residency at the Chateau de La Napoule Art Foundation in France in 1996; with the Jimmy Ernst Award in Art from the American Academy of Arts and Letters for her lifetime contributions in 1997; with the Arkansas Governor's Individual Artist Award in 2005; and with an honorary doctorate in Fine Arts from the University of Arkansas in 2014. In addition, in October 2002, her pink alabaster "Persephone" was acquired by New York City's Metropolitan Museum of Art, a rare honor for a living artist. Her work is also in the permanent collections of the Crystal Bridges Museum of American Art and the Arkansas Art Center. Huffington died on March 15, 2025, at the age of 90.
