= Anita Bhardwaj =

Indian high-altitude rescue doctor

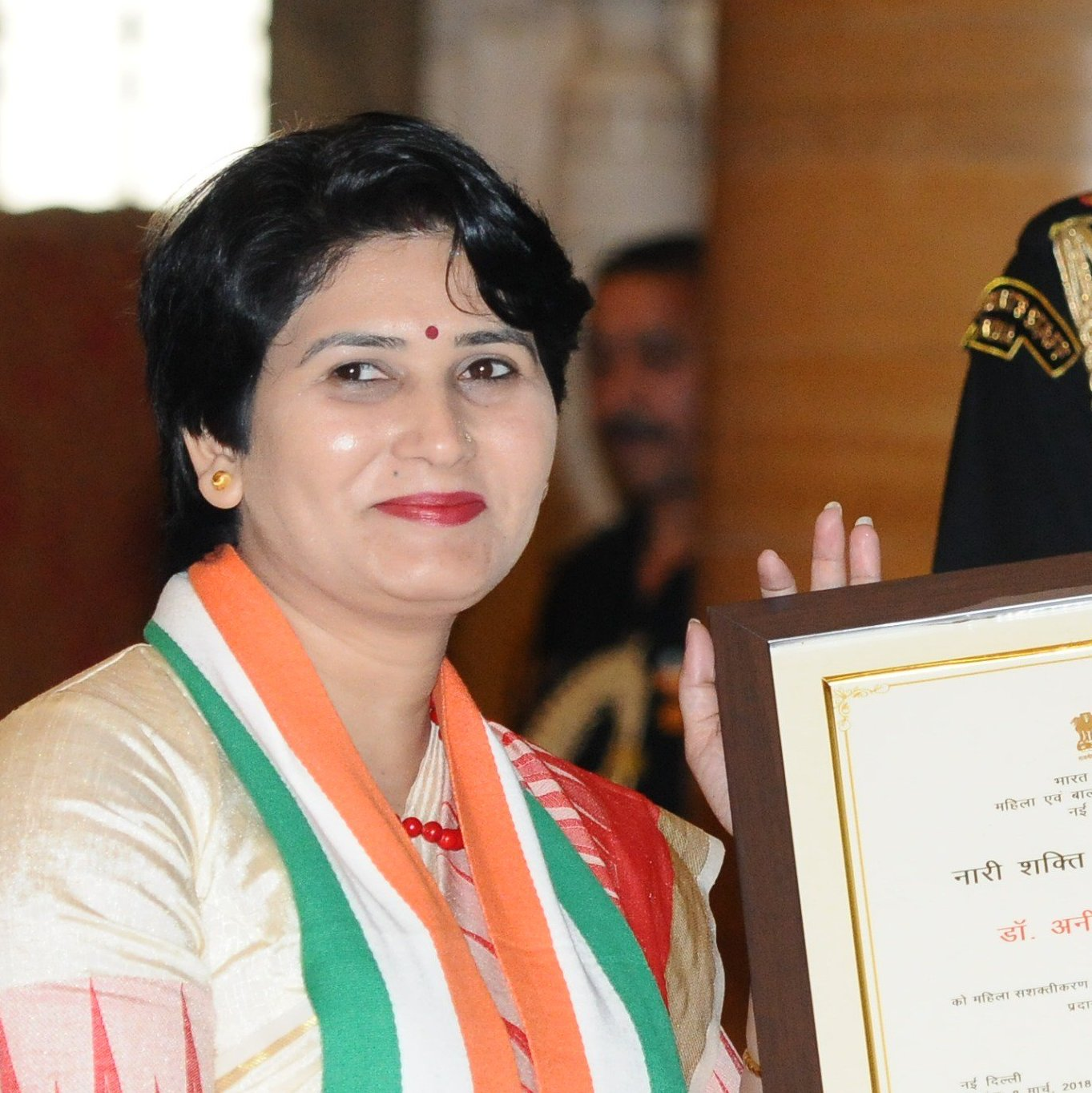
- Anita Bhardwaj on 8 March 2018
- Occupation: Doctor
- Employer: Six Sigma High Altitude Medical Rescue Services
- Known for: high-altitude medicine

Anita Bhardwaj is an Indian high-altitude rescue doctor. She is joint medical director of the Six Sigma High Altitude Medical Rescue Services and she has received the highest award for women in India, the Nari Shakti Puraskar.

== Life ==
She is the medical director of the Six Sigma Healthcare High Altitude Medical Rescue Services, India. The service had helped (as of March 2018) over 50,000 people at high altitude and saved the lives of over 5,000 women and children operating at altitudes up to 24,000 feet.

In 2014 she was awarded the Kalpana Chawla Shaurya Award for her work including trips she had made to give free medical care to pilgrims. The award carried a prize of 50,000 rupees.

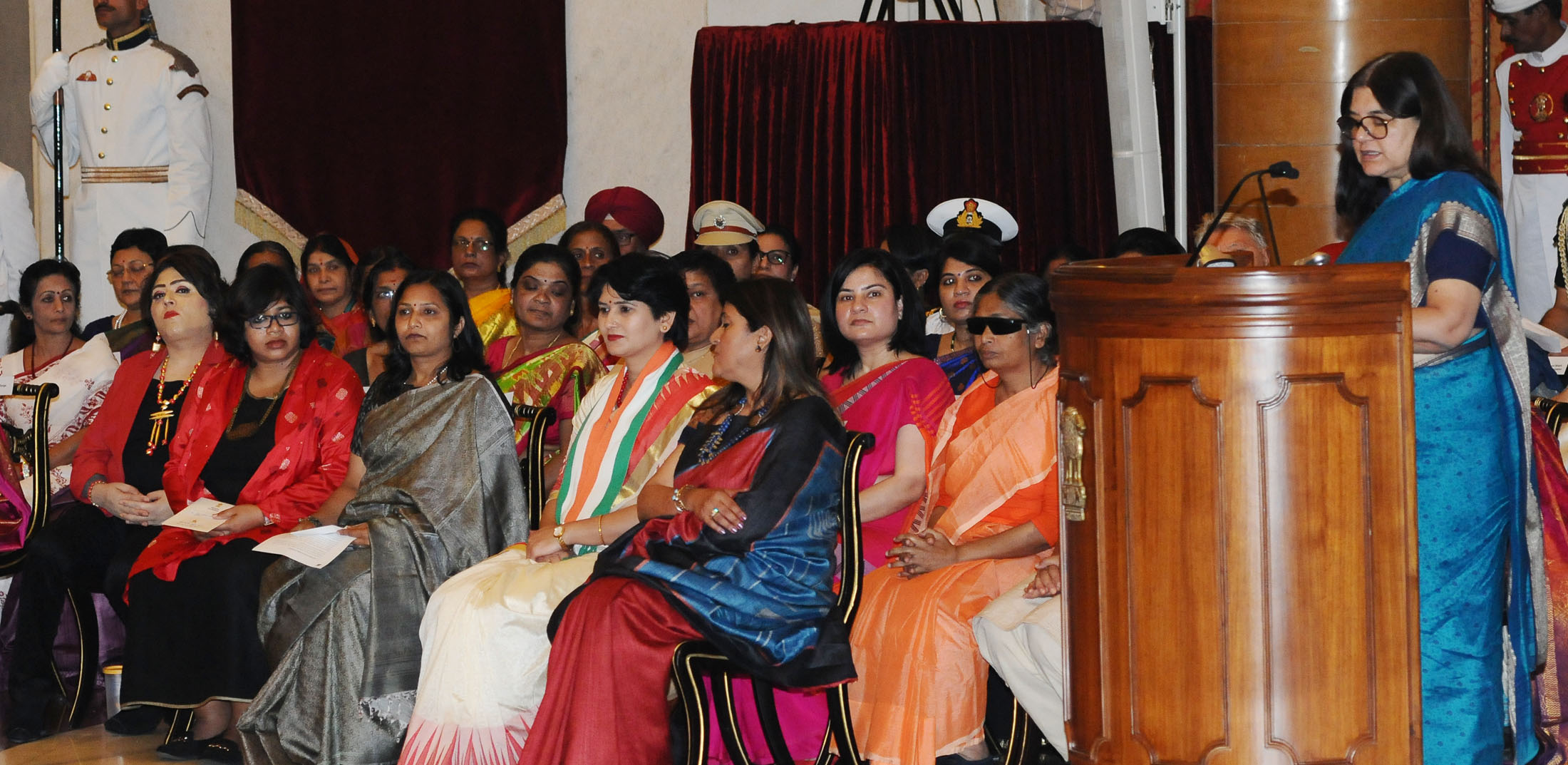
Maneka Sanjay Gandhi talking at the presentation of the Nari Shakti Puruskar for 2017 (in 2018) - She's in the centre

Bhardwaj is known for visiting the mountains to assist in rescues. She has joined dozens of others at the scenes of Uttarakhand flood, Nepal earthquake and Amarnath Yatra attack.

Her award of the Nari Shakti Puraskar was made in the Durbar room of the Rashtrapati Bhavan (Presidential Palace) by the President of India, Ram Nath Kovind, on International Women's Day. The award is India's highest civilian award for women.

In July 2019 Uttarakhand Chief Minister Trivendra Singh Rawat agreed to fund a mountain institute at Rudraprayag. The funding would create 1,200 jobs and it would be run by the Six Sigma High Altitude Medical Rescue Services. The new centre would supply education and training as well as medical services. He gave awards to the services leading staff including Dr Pradeep Bhardwaj, CEO & Medical Director, Dr Arvind Kumar, Dr Parvez Ahmad, Bhim Bahadur, Debjit Nayak and Bhardwaj.

== Personal life ==
She is married to Dr Pradeep Bhardwaj.
