= Anita Grūbe =

Latvian actress

Anita Grūbe (born 13 July 1955 in Riga) is a Latvian theatre and film actress.
