= Anita Johansson =

Anita Johansson may refer to:

- Anita Johansson (politician) (born 1944), Swedish social democratic politician
- Anita Johansson (figure skater) (born 1954), former Swedish figure skater
