= Anita Schug =

Rohingya refugee, doctor, humanitarian

- Born: Myanmar
- Citizenship: Burmese/Rohingya
- Occupations: Neurosurgeon, Humanitarian
- Known for: Spokesperson on Rohingya issues

Anita Schug is a Rohingya neurosurgeon and human rights activist based in Solothurn, Switzerland. At the age of five she fled Myanmar with her family, learned medicine in Ukraine and is a co-founder of the Rohingya Medics Organisation.

== Early life ==
Schug was born in Rangoon, Myanmar. Doctors refused care to her mother at the hospital when giving birth because her family is Rohingya Muslim. Her father was a chemical engineer.

In the 1980s, when Anita Schug was five years old, her family fled Myanmar for Bangladesh, having paid people smugglers.

Her family then moved to Pakistan, to the United Arab Emirates and then to Ukraine, where Schug studied medicine. She speaks eight languages.

== Career ==
Schug was the head of Women and Children Affairs for the European Rohingya Council and is the co-founder of the Rohingya Medics Organisation.

In 2017, she spoke of the thousands of Rohingya women killed in Rakhine state and confirmed reports of violence against Rohingya refugees in Bangladesh.

In September 2017, Schug called the violence in Myanmar "a slow burning genocide".

In 2018, she spoke about the widespread sexual abuse of Rohingya women in Buthidaung prison, Myanmar.

In 2020, Schug spoke of the practical difficulties of following World Health Organization advice for social distancing for those who lived in crowded refugee camps, and called for faster distribution of food to refugees.

== Family ==
Schug has two sisters who are also both doctors. She has two children and is married to a German trauma surgeon.
