= Anita Khemka =

Indian photographer (born 1972)

- Born: 1972 (age 53–54)
- Occupation: Photographer
- Website: https://anitakhemka-website-plum-one.vercel.app/

Anita Khemka (born 1972) is an Indian photographer.

Khemka is known for her work documenting India's third-sex hijra community, Her work with hijra was documented in the 2006 film Between the Lines: India's Third Gender.

Her work is included in the collection of the Museum of Fine Arts Houston.
