= Anita Miller =

Anita Miller may refer to:

- Anita Miller (urbanist) (born 1931), American urban renewal pioneer
- Anita Miller (publisher) (1926–2018), American author and publisher
- Anita Miller (field hockey) (born 1951), American field hockey player and Olympic athlete
- Anita Miller Smith (1893–1968), American impressionist and regionalist painter
