= Anita Soina =

Kenyan environmentalist (born 1999)

- Born: 24 December 1999 (age 26); Kajiado North
- Occupations: climate activist and politician
- Website: https://thesoinafoundation.org/anita-soina/

Anita Soina (24 December 1999) is a Kenyan environmentalist by passion and also water and climate change advocate from the Maasai community. She is the author of the book Green War.

Under the mentorship of Erick Inghatt Matsanza, the founder and Social Change Catalyst at Spice Without Borders, a leadership academy for social change innovators and a member of the jury at the Africa 40 Under Forty Awards, Anita founded Spice Warriors an environmental organization at the age of 18 to help rally youths from all over to be environmentally conscious. She is also the founder of The Soina Foundation which seeks to address other social issues as sexual reproductive health education, GBV, WASH, and education, among others.

Her efforts have contributed to her being nominated in different conferences such as COP 26 in the UK, UNEA 5, Stockholm plus 50 in Sweden, Sustainable Energy for All Forum in Rwanda, COP 27 among others. Anita Soina is the new 2023-2024 Global Youth Champion for Sanitation and Water for All (SWA).

== Background and education ==
Anita Soina was born in 1999. She was born and raised in North Kajiado, Kenya and hails from the minority Maasai community. She graduated with a Bachelor of Arts in Public Relations and Corporate Communication, at the Multimedia University of Kenya in 2021. Soina also did a program at the HarvardX, the online education platform for Harvard University, on the health effects of climate change.

== Career ==
Anita Soina is an environmentalist and climate change activists & advocate. She is the new 2023-2024 Global Youth Champion for UN Hosted partnerships on Sanitation and Water for All (SWA).

She is the Ambassador of Wild About Life Campaigns - A joint initiative of The nature conservancy, Northern Rangelands Trust, Kenya Wildlife Conservancy Association and Light Art club(June 2021 – Present)

She is part of the Communications team at We Don't Have Time Organisation.

Before engaging in conservation fully, Anita Soina worked as a digital and artist manager at EMB records, seven haven music and Shirko Media.

She was also a digital manager and brand ambassador at Lake Basin Dental and orthodontics centre.

== Early childhood and activism ==
As a child, she recalls spending time with her grandfather who had a passion for politics and leadership. "He used to ask us to keep quiet so he could listen to the news on the radio. He gave me a love for understanding what is going on in my country. I knew I was going to run for political office someday," she laughs.

Her journey to leadership began in high school where she chaired her local scouting club. She also took a keen interest in the United Nations Sustainable Development Goals (SDGs). "Eventually, I settled on getting involved with the goal on climate action because I felt it needed more young voices," she said.

Her first environmental projects focused on tree planting, an easy place for young people with limited finances to start. However, she soon realized that many young activists, including herself, often felt disconnected from sustainable development and conservation due to the technical language and jargon too often used by these sectors.

Anita Soina remembers a time when her community would drive livestock down to the banks of the great Mara River in Kenya.

"We'd water the animals, swim, fetch water for our homes and wash clothes," she said.

The waterway has been affected by deforestation, mining, resource management, and climate change.

On a recent visit to her family home, the 23-year-old climate and water activist said she was shocked to watch people using stepping stones to cross the river, rather than bridges which were once a necessity.

Today, Soina is focusing her activism on water security, as well as good sanitation practices, in order to protect the world's remaining resources. This month, she kicks off a two-year tenure as the Global Youth Champion for the UN-hosted Sanitation and Water for All global partnership (SWA).

Activism and service run deep in Soina's blood.

== Political journey ==
While understanding that lack of political goodwill is the biggest contributor to zero implementations when it comes to climate and other global community problems, She decided to present herself as a candidate for Member of Parliament for Kajiado North Constituency in the just concluded general election.

Soina joined United Democratic Alliance(UDA) as her first party to contest on Member of Parliament position representing Kajiado North, Kenya in the 13th Parliament of Kenya. Later, on 24 March 2022, she left UDA for Green Thinking Action Party (GTAP) led by Isaac Kalua to vie for the same position. She moved to GTAP because at that time, she believed that Environment is at the centre of every economic model and at that time GTAP also had a strategy to lessen nomination fees for women aspirants seeking to contest for elective positions in the 2022 general elections.

Before the Kenyan elections of August 2022, Soina said she would run for GTAP. She was the youngest candidate to run for office as the member of parliament.

== Controversy ==
In 2019, it was revealed that Lawrence Macharia (Terrence Creative )was having an affair with Anita, who was nineteen while he was in his forties. Soina stated that, as a result of the relationship, she received threats from Milly Chebby, the comedian's wife.

== Selected publications ==
- 2020: Green War (Wasilisha Solutions, ISBN 9789966180650).
- 2021: TEDx Talk
- Political Aspirant
