= Steve Ontiveros =

Steve Ontiveros may refer to:

- Steve Ontiveros (infielder) (born 1951), Major League Baseball infielder who played from 1973 through 1980
- Steve Ontiveros (pitcher) (born 1961), Major League Baseball All-Star pitcher who played from 1985 through 2000
