= Anita Thompson =

Anita Thompson may refer to:

- Anita Thompson Dickinson Reynolds (1901–1980), African-American model, dancer, and actress
- Anita Thompson (born 1972), née Bejmuk, the assistant and wife of Hunter S. Thompson
