= Anita Takura =

Ghanaian academic

Anita Takura is a Ghanaian Agricultural and Environmental Science academic. Takura received the 2013 L'Oreal UNESCO fellows award.
