= Anita Rodriguez =

American painter

- Born: 1941 (age 84–85); Taos, New Mexico, U.S.
- Known for: Painting

Anita Rodriguez (born 1941) is an American artist and painter. Her work incorporates Native American ceremonialism, Mexican mysticism and Hispanic folk art as well as the Penitente art of New Mexico, Native American dances and ceremonies, and Catholic traditions. She has a work in the collection of the New Mexico Capitol Art Collection, Eteljorg Museum in Indianapolis, the Albuquerque Museum of Art and the Harwood Museum of Art in Taos. She is also an enjarrada, a specialist in traditional adobe construction, and has won awards for her work.

== Biography ==
Rodriguez was born in Taos, New Mexico. Her father's side of the family were "native Hispanic Taoseños" and had been living in the area for many generations. Her mother was a painter from Austin, Texas who relocated to Taos in order to study art with Walter Ufer. Rodriguez was raised Catholic.

During Rodriguez's teen years, she went to Mexico City where she spent time painting and learned the styles of Mexican artists such as Frida Kahlo.

Rodriguez took art at both Colorado College and at the University of Denver. Later, she gave birth to a daughter, Shemai, in 1965. She started her own construction company in Taos in order to support herself and her daughter. Her construction work focused on the use of adobe to create fireplaces and nichos. While studying the art of adobe, she traveled from village to village speaking with and recording the remaining enjarradoras, learning from them as well as preserving their history. Even while working on fireplaces, Rodriguez felt that instead of creating something commonplace, that her work was "functional sculpture." After Shemai grew up and left the house, Rodriguez retired from construction and started painting full-time.

She later moved to Guanajuato, Mexico in 1996 and left to move back to Taos in 2010.

== Art ==
Rodriguez's art is very concerned with death, resurrection and its relationship to Mexican culture. The idea of death for Rodriguez has two major functions. The first is that without death, there is no eternal life and the second is to remind the viewer to enjoy their life now. The skeletons she uses to embody this concept have ties to traditional Mexican art and are present in many of her works. She also traces the uses of skeletons as an art motif further back to pre-Columbian times.

Rodriguez is influenced by indigenous religious practices, Christian themes and also Jewish celebrations. Rodriguez enjoys combining and contrasting different spiritual and cultural traditions, reflecting the multicultural world that she grew up with in Taos.

Stylistically, she often centers her subject matter, relating her work to stained glass or altar pieces. Composition is less important than the subject matter or idea being expressed by Rodriguez. Her color choices are bright and vibrant.

Rodriguez hides messages and ideas throughout her paintings which function as visual puns and humorous messages.

== Quotes ==
"The fear of death and its denial is the first denial--triggering a chain of denials. The fear of death engenders all deceit and ends by actually preventing one from living. The daily remembrances of death gives one great personal power--the power to distinguish between the important and the trivial. It teaches one to love life, to celebrate it and respect its fragility. It makes one treasure loved ones and to appreciate the simplest joys."

"Skeletons have always been paramount in my work. Bones stand for my belief in deep democracy--everybody has the same bones and death comes to us all."

== Publications ==
- Rodriguez, Anita (1992). Jamal and the angel : an Aunt Martha story. New York: Clarkson Potter. ISBN 0517586010. LCCN 91011636.
- Rodriguez, Anita (1993). Aunt Martha and the golden coin : an Aunt Martha story. New York: Clarkson Potter. ISBN 0517593378. LCCN 92073146.
- Rodriguez, Anita (2016). Coyota in the kitchen : a memoir of new and old Mexico. Albuquerque: University of New Mexico Press. ISBN 9780826356727. LCCN 2015026032.
