= Anita McConnell =

British historian, writer and curator (1936–2016)

Anita McConnell FRSA, FRGS, FRMetS
- Born: Anita Airoldi; 22 January 1936; London, England
- Died: 28 April 2016 (aged 80); Switzerland
- Occupations: Historian; writer; curator

Academic background
- Education: University of Leicester
- Thesis: The development of instruments and apparatus for physical oceanography 1800–1914 (1978)

Anita McConnell FRSA, FRGS, FRMetS (née Airoldi; 22 January 1936 – 28 April 2016) was a British historian of science, writer and curator, specialising in the history of oceanography and British scientific instrument makers of the 18th and 19th centuries.

== Early life ==
McConnell was born Anita Airoldi on 22 January 1936 in London to the chefs Giuseppe Antonio "Joseph Antony" Airoldi (1911–1985) and Lottie Grace Airoldi (née Lavington: 1907–1983). (Note: Her mother's first name is also cited as Charlotte.) Her father was Italian and her mother was British. During the Second World War she was sent as a child evacuee to the West Country and finished her secondary education with four O Levels. In 1957 she took a job location catering for such films as The Inn of the Sixth Happiness and The Bridge on the River Kwai, the latter resulting in a six-month stay in Sri Lanka.

== Career ==
In 1963 she took a job at the Science Museum, London, as an assistant with the Navigation and Meteorology collections. She later assisted with preparation work for setting up the National Railway Museum. In 1973 she rejoined the Science Museum to become curator of Oceanography and Geophysics. From 1961 to 1979 she successively attained a diploma in archaeology, a degree in geography, a master's degree in history of technology and a doctorate from the University of Leicester, which appeared in print as No Sea Too Deep, The History of Oceanographic Instruments. In 1968, McConnell became a fellow of the Royal Geographical Society.

She began writing in 1980 and published works particularly on the history of oceanography and British scientific instrument makers of the 18th and 19th centuries. Her popular book on barometers was written in 1988. In her work on oceanographic instruments she was noted for the level of detail achieved and in her biographies of scientific instrument makers she was noted for her ability to work from archived material such as clients letters.

In 1993, she became a research editor for the Dictionary of National Biography for Oxford University Press, initially working on entries for instrument makers and clock makers, and later, also on science and medicine. McConnell was also a fellow of the Royal Society of Arts, the Royal Meteorological Society and Hakluyt Society.

On 28 April 2016, McConnell died aged 80 whilst visiting a friend in Switzerland. McConnell was cremated and her ashes scattered in Switzerland.

== Selected publications ==
- McConnell, Anita (1980). Geomagnetic instruments before 1900: An illustrated account of their construction and use. London: Harriet Wynter.
- McConnell, Anita (1981). Historical Instruments in Oceanography: Background to the Oceanography Collection at the Science Museum. London: HMSO. ISBN 011290324X.
- McConnell, Anita (1982). No Sea Too Deep: The History of Oceanographic Instruments. Bristol: Adam Hilger.
- Lambert, David; McConnell, Anita (1985). Seas and Oceans. London: Orbis Publications. ISBN 9780856138362.
- McConnell, Anita (1985). The World Beneath Us. New York; London: Facts on File; Orbis Publications. ISBN 0816010684.
- McConnell, Anita (1988). Barometers. Shire Album, 220. Princes Risborough: Shire Publications. ISBN 9780852639634.
- McConnell, Anita (1990). Directory of Source Materials for the History of Oceanography. Unesco Technical Papers in Marine Science, 58. Paris: UNESCO Division of Marine Sciences.
- McConnell, Anita (1992). Instrument Makers to the World: A History of Cooke, Troughton & Simms. York: William Sessions Limited; University of York. ISBN 9781850720966.
- McConnell, Anita (1993). R. B. Bate of the Poultry 1782–1847: The Life and Times of a Scientific Instrument Maker. London: Scientific Instrument Society. ISBN 9780952152507.
- McConnell, Anita (1998). King of the clinicals: the life and times of J. J. Hicks 1837–1916. York: William Sessions Limited. ISBN 9781850722045.
- Marsili, Luigi Ferdinando (1999). Histoire physique de la mer [Natural History of the Sea]. Translated by McConnell, Anita. Bologna: Collezione di Fisica dell'Università di Bologna. ISBN 9788890040306.
- McConnell, Anita (2007). Jesse Ramsden (1735–1800) London's Leading Scientific Instrument Maker. Science, Technology and Culture, 1700–1945. Aldershot: Ashgate Publishing. ISBN 9780754661368.
- Gee, Brian (2014). McConnell, Anita; Morrison-Low, A. D. (eds.). Francis Watkins and the Dollond Telescope Patent Controversy. Science, Technology and Culture, 1700–1945. Aldershot: Ashgate Publishing. ISBN 9781409466437.
