= Anita Endrezze =

American writer and painter (born 1952)

Anita Endrezze (born 1952) is an American poet, writer, and artist based in Washington.

== Background ==
Endrezze was born in Long Beach, California, in 1952. She claims Yaqui ancestry from her father and Slovenian, German and Italian ancestry from her mother.

She graduated with a master's degree from Eastern Washington University.

== Career ==
Endrezze is a storyteller, artist and teacher. She teaches university courses and her work has been translated into seven languages, published in ten countries. She has taken part in the Washington State Council for the Humanities Speakers' Series.

== Poet and artist ==
In March 2000, Endrezze's book Throwing Fire at the Sun, Water at the Moon was published. The book is illustrated by her paintings.

A book of Endrezze's poems, at the helm of twilight, won the 1992 Bumbershoot/Weyerhaeuser Award and the Governor's Writing Award for Washington State. She also received a grant from Artist Trust to aid her in researching Throwing Fire at the Sun, Water at the Moon. Lune D'Ambre, a book of her poems translated into French, and published in France by the distinguished house, Rogerie, and a book, The Humming of Stars and Bees and Waves, published in England by Making Waves Press joins her international publications, along with a children's novel, The Mountain and the Guardian Spirit, (CDForlag) in Danish.

== Personal ==
Endrezze married David W. Danielson (1940–2023) in 1976. They divorced in 1987. Endrezze lives in Everett, Washington, and she is married with two children.

== Awards ==
Endrezze's book At the Helm of Twilight was the winner of the Washington Governor's Writers Award and the 1992 Bumbershoot/Weyerhaeuser Publication Award.

== Books by Anita Endrezze ==
- Throwing Fire at the Sun, Water at the Moon, (Sun Tracks, V. 40), University of Arizona Press. Review at Voices in the Gaps. Publisher's page
- The Humming of Stars and Bees and Waves, Making Waves Press.
- at the helm of twilight, Broken Moon Press.A review of At the Helm of Twilight by Leslie Ulman from the Kenyon Review
- Burning the Fields, a Confluence Chapbook, Confluence Press, Lewis and Clark State College.
- The North People, The Blue Cloud Quarterly Press.

=== Textbooks ===
- Approaching Literature in the 21st Century, Peter Schakel & Jack Ridl (Editors), Bedford/St. Martins Press.
- Three Genres: The Writing of Poetry, Fiction, and Drama, Stephen Minot, Prentice Hall.
- Approaching Poetry: Perspectives and Responses, Peter Schakel and Jack Ridl, St. Martin's Press.
- Western Wind: An Introduction to Poetry, by John Frederick Nims, McGraw Hill Text.
- Dreams and Inward Journeys: A Reader for Writers, Marjorie Ford, Jon Ford, Harpercollins College Div.
- Elements of Literature, by Robert Anderson, Holt Rinehart & Winston.
- Yo Words, One Reel, Seattle 1994
- " The Girl Who Loved the Sky "

=== Interviews ===
- Here First, Arnold Krupat, Brian Swann (Editors), Random House

== Work published in translation ==
- Lune d'Ambre, (Rougerie, 1993) poems in French.
- Bjerget og Skystsaanden (The Mountain and the Guardian Spirit) (CDR Forlag, 1986)
- A children's book in Danish
