= Anita Hill (researcher) =

Australian researcher in materials and process engineering

Anita J. Hill
- Education: Duke University
- Scientific career
- Institutions: CSIRO

Anita J. Hill is an Australian researcher in materials and process engineering. She is a former Chief Scientist of the Commonwealth Scientific and Industrial Research Organisation (CSIRO), and the current Executive Director of Future Industries at CSIRO. Her research focuses on the transport of atoms, ions and small molecules in condensed matter, notably using positron annihilation spectroscopy.

== Education and career ==
Hill obtained her PhD in Mechanical Engineering and Materials Science from Duke University, USA. She began her academic career as a lecturer at Monash University. She joined CSIRO in 1996. In 2008, Hill accepted the position of Chief Research Scientist and Office of the Chief Executive Science Leader at CSIRO. In 2014 and 2015, she served twice as Acting Chief Scientist during transitional periods, then as Chief Scientist from February 2017 to September 2018. She was succeeded in this role by Cathy Foley. She is currently Executive Director of Future Industries at CSIRO, a sector consisting of over 1500 researchers across 25 sites in Australia and overseas.

== Research ==
Her work focuses on the transport of atoms, ions and small molecules through solids. Her work makes particular use of positron annihilation spectroscopy as a tool to measure the distribution of free volume elements in soft materials such as polymer films.

== Awards and recognition ==
Hill has received several professional awards and honours, including:

- Adjunct Fellow, Monash University School of Chemistry, 2010
- Australian Research Council College of Experts, 2009
- Guest Editor, International Journal of Nanotechnology, 2008
- Fellow, Academy of Technological Sciences and Engineering, 2008
- CSIRO Medals for Research Achievement, 2004 and 2002.
- Fellow of the Royal Australian Chemical Institute (RACI)
- Fellow of the Australian Academy of Science.

She is a current member of the Advisory Boards of the Australian Institute for Bioengineering and Nanotechnology (AIBN University of Queensland), Australian Centre of Excellence in Electromaterials Science (ACES University of Wollongong), Chair of the Science Advisory Board of The Australian Synchrotron, Swinburne Industry Research Board, Industry Advisory Board of the School of Information Technology and Electrical Engineering (ITEE University of Queensland), and Journal of Polymer Science: Polymer Physics (editorial board). She is a former member of Advisory Boards for the Victorian Centre for Sustainable Chemical Manufacturing (VCSCM), the Australian eHealth Research Centre (AeHRC), the National Centre of Excellence in Desalination Australia (NCEDA), and the Institute for Frontier Materials (Deakin University).
