= Anita Hansbo =

Swedish mathematician and academic administrator

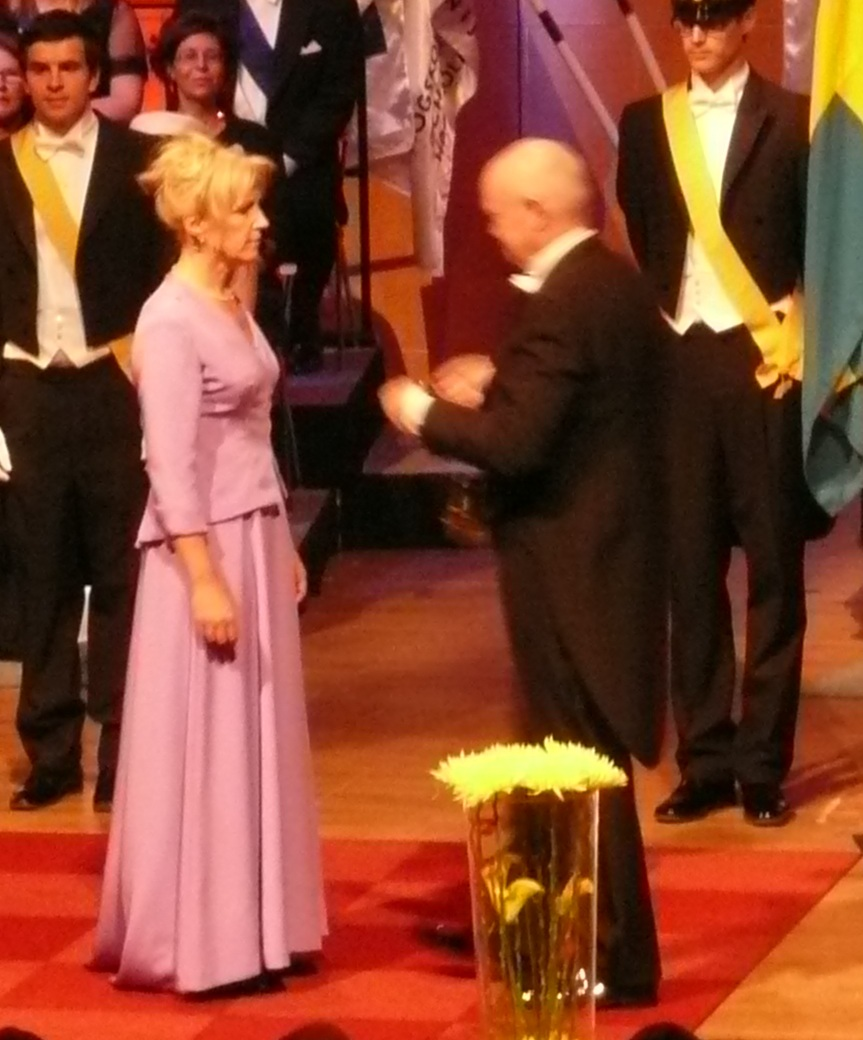
Installation as rector of Jönköping University, 2010

Anita Hansbo (born 1960) is a Swedish mathematician and academic administrator, the former rector or president of Jönköping University.

== Education and early career ==
Hansbo earned her Ph.D. in 2000 from the University of Gothenburg. Her dissertation, Some Results Related to Smoothing in Discetized Linear Parabolic Equations, was supervised by Vidar Thomée.

Before coming to Jönköping University, Hansbo taught at the University of Gothenburg, Chalmers University of Technology, Karlstad University, and University West. She came to University West in the 1990s, and became deputy vice chancellor there in 2004.

== Jönköping ==
She moved to Jönköping University in 2007 as University Director, became acting rector in 2009, and in 2010 was installed as the rector of the university.

As head of the university, she presided over its official name change from Högskolan i Jönköping to its English translation, Jönköping University. However, she was criticized for centralizing the university's power structure.

In 2016 she went on leave from the university for chronic fatigue, and announced that she would retire as rector, effective June 2018, keeping her position as a mathematics professor.
