= Anita Carleton =

American software engineer

Anita D. Carleton is an American computer scientist and software engineer whose research concerns software measurement, the Capability Maturity Model, statistical process control, and their applications in managing and improving the software development process. She works in the Software Engineering Institute, associated with Carnegie Mellon University, as director of the Software Solutions Division.

== Education and career ==
Carleton majored in applied mathematics at Carnegie Mellon University; she has an MBA from the MIT Sloan School of Management. She worked on missile weapon systems software at GTE and on tire modeling and simulation at the Goodyear Tire and Rubber Company, before her move to the Software Engineering Institute in the late 1980s.

== Book ==
Carleton is the coauthor, with William A. Floranc, of the book Measuring the Software Process: Statistical Process Control for Software Process Improvement (Addison-Wesley, 1999).

== Recognition ==
Carleton was elected as an IEEE Fellow in 2022, "for leadership in the advancement of software measurement and practices".
