= Anita Doreen Diggs =

American editor, novelist, and lecturer

Anita Doreen Diggs (born 1966 in New York City) is an American editor, novelist, and lecturer.

== Biography ==
Diggs grew up in New York City, where she attended public schools in the Hell's Kitchen section of Manhattan.

She later worked as a senior editor at Random House until 2002 and was a senior editor at Thunder's Mouth Press.

Diggs is also the author of four novels.

She has written books on career advice and resources for African Americans. She teaches creative writing for Gotham Writers Workshop. She is also a writing mentor with the Creative Nonfiction mentoring program.

== Works ==
=== Novels ===
- A Mighty Love (2003)
- A Meeting in the Ladies Room (2004)
- The Other Side of the Game (2005)
- Denzel's Lips (2006)
