= Anita Rossing-Brown =

Swedish diver

Personal information
- Nationality: Swedish
- Born: 13 October 1960 (age 64); Gothenburg, Sweden

Sport
- Sport: Diving

Anita Rossing-Brown (born 13 October 1960) is a Swedish former diver. She competed at the 1984 Summer Olympics and the 1988 Summer Olympics.
