= Anita H. Clayton =

American researcher

Anita H. Clayton is the former Chair of Psychiatry and Neurobehavioral Sciences and the David C. Wilson Professor of Psychiatry and Neurobehavioral Sciences in the Department of Psychiatry and Neurobehavioral Sciences at the University of Virginia School of Medicine. From 2005 to 2007, she was the President of the International Society for the Study of Women's Sexual Health (ISSWSH).

== Early life and education ==
Born in Pensacola, Florida, she was the daughter of a Navy pilot, and her family moved to several locations worldwide to follow her father's assignments. Clayton completed her undergraduate studies at the University of Virginia and was awarded an M.D. degree by the University of Virginia School of Medicine in 1982. Her residency was in Psychiatry at the University of Virginia, and she then was awarded a Fellowship in Clinical Neuropsychology. She served as a U.S. Navy physician for four years before returning to join the faculty at the University of Virginia School of Medicine in 1990.

== Career and research ==
Clayton's research interests are in psychopharmacology, sexual dysfunction with psychiatric illness and treatment; sexual disorders; and depressive disorders associated with the female reproductive cycle.

== Works ==
- Women's mental health. Susan G. Kornstein, Anita H. Clayton. Amsterdam. 2019. ISBN 978-0-323-71346-7. OCLC 1104593141.
- Women's mental health : a comprehensive textbook. Susan G. Kornstein, Anita H. Clayton. New York: Guilford. c. 2005. ISBN 978-1-60623-416-7. OCLC 1124405656.
- Clayton, Anita H. (2007). Satisfaction : women, sex, and the quest for intimacy. Robin Cantor-Cooke. New York: Ballantine Books. ISBN 978-1-4000-6452-6. OCLC 76937376.
- Restoring intimacy : the patient's guide to maintaining relationships during depression. Drew Pinsky, National Depressive and Manic-Depressive Association. Chicago: National DMDA. 1999. ISBN 0-9673893-0-5. OCLC 42882394.
