= Anita Blair =

Anita Blair may refer to:

- Anita K. Blair (born 1950), U.S. government official
- Anita Lee Blair (1916–2010), first blind woman elected to any state legislature in the US
