= Anita Cochran (astronomer) =

American astronomer

Anita L. Cochran
- Born: New York, New York
- Education: Cornell University, University of Texas at Austin, (masters, Ph.D.)
- Scientific career
- Fields: Astronomy
- Workplaces: University of Texas at Austin

Anita L. Cochran is an American astronomer, planetary scientist, and senior research scientist at the University of Texas at Austin. She is also the assistant director for research support at the McDonald Observatory. She focuses on the study of primitive bodies in the Solar System and the composition of comets.

== Early life and education ==
Cochran was born in New York City and raised on Long Island. She earned a bachelor's degree in physics from Cornell University in 1976. She then went on to the University of Texas at Austin, where she completed a master's degree in astronomy in 1979 and her PhD in astronomy in 1982.

== Career ==
In her astronomy career, Cochran has taken on numerous high-level leadership roles. She served, for instance, as the chair of the Division for Planetary Sciences of the American Astronomical Society from 1995 to 1996 and a committee member from 1989 to 1992. She has also served on several committees for the National Research Council, including the Committee on Planetary and Lunar Exploration (COMPLEX). She was a co-investigator on the Comet Nucleus Tour, or CONTOUR, mission and on the imaging team for NASA's Comet Rendezvous Asteroid Flyby Mission.

She is currently a member of the International Astronomical Union and the National Optical Astronomy Observatory's Observatory Council.

== Personal life ==
Anita Cochran is married to fellow astronomer Bill Cochran.
