= Anita Mehta =

Indian physicist

- Born: Calcutta
- Education: Oxford University
- Known for: Granular Physics
- Awards: Rhodes Scholarship, Radcliffe Fellowship, Fellowship of the American Physical Society
- Scientific career
- Fields: Theoretical Physics
- Workplaces: University of Oxford, Radcliffe Institute

Dr. Anita Mehta, born in Calcutta, India, is a physicist and Leverhulme Visiting Professor at the University of Oxford.

== Education ==
After her B.Sc. in Physics from Presidency College, Calcutta, Mehta went to Oxford as the second Indian woman Rhodes Scholar to St Catherine's College, Oxford University, graduating with an M.A. and a DPhil in Theoretical Physics.

== Work ==
Mehta after completing her education did postdoctoral work at IBM, following this with a Research Associateship under the mentorship of Professor Sir Sam Edwards, when she worked in the field of granular physics at the Cavendish Laboratory, Cambridge. Mehta was elected India's first Radcliffe Fellow to Harvard in 2007-8 and was awarded the Fellowship of the American Physical Society. Mehta has been a visiting professor at the University of Rome, the University of Leipzig, the Institut de Physique Theorique (France) and the Max Planck Institute for Mathematics in the Sciences, among others. She has been an Academic Visitor of Somerville College, Oxford.

Mehta had a Leverhulme Visiting Professorship at the University of Oxford as faculty of the Linguistics, Philology and Phonetics until 2019. There, she works on modelling speech perception and the dynamical evolution of language and grammatical forms.

== Works ==
- Her main areas of work include granular media, complex systems, glassy dynamics in soft matter, optimization, statistical physics in an interdisciplinary context, and nonlinear dynamics.
- Mehta has written 3 books and 142 papers published.
- Anita Mehta Granular Physics. Cambridge University Press. 28 June 2007. ISBN 978-1-139-46531-1.
- Anita Mehta Granular Matter: An Interdisciplinary Approach. 1994 ISBN 978-1-4612-4290-1
