= Anita Paillamil =

Mapuche textile artist

- Occupation: Artist, weaver

Anita Paillamil is a Mapuche master weaver and researcher who is best known for her weaving work for the collaborative art project known as "Encoded Textiles." She was selected as a part of the Smithsonian Institution's Artist Leadership Initiative and was honored in 2014 by the World Fair Trade Organization for her contributions to the preservation and research on textile art.

== Personal life ==
Paillamil is from Nueva Imperial. She was part of Fundación Chol Chol, a fair trade organization dedicated to the indigenous Mapuche communities. She also serves as the president of the Asociación Newen Ngürrekafe, an organization dedicated to serving women weavers from the Bío-Bío and Araucanía regions.

== Career ==
=== Work as an Artist ===
In 2012, Paillamil worked with Chilean artist Guillermo Bert to create his "Encoded Textiles," which combined traditional mapuche weaving with QR Code designs and were featured in multiple exhibits including 'Guillermo Bert: Encoded Textiles' (2012) at the Pasadena Museum of California Art and 'New Territories: Laboratories for Design, Craft and Art in Latin America' (2015) at the Museum of Arts and Design (NY). Paillamil's and Guillermo Bert's, Mapuche Portal #3, from the series Encoded Textiles, was also included as part of the Renwick Gallery's 50th Anniversary Exhibit, 'This Present Moment: Crafting A Better World' (2022-2023).

In 2021, her work was displayed in the exhibit “Meli Newen – Cuatro Fuerzas,” which was sponsored by Temuco Catholic University as part of their COVID-19 pandemic art initiative “Tejido de Fraternidad.”

=== Work as a researcher ===
In 2014, she was a participant Smithsonian Institution National Museum of the American Indian's Artist Leadership Program and traveled to the Smithsonian Institution to research Mapuche photographs, textiles and iconography and then share her research with the Indigenous Association Wallontu Witral cooperative, located near Temuco, Chile. During her research, she had also helped reclassify certain items in the Smithsonian Collection. In 2015, Paillamil presented her weaving and represented Chile at the World Expo in Milan.
