= Anita Yusof =

First Malaysian woman to motorcycle around the world

Anita Yusof (57 years) is a Malaysian born who became notable when she became the first Muslim woman ever to motorcycle around the world "Global Dream Ride" and the first Malaysian to be recorded in the Asian Book of Records for the longest solo ride in 2015.

== Early life ==
Anita was born in Batu Pahat, Johor in Malaysia, but was raised in Ipoh, Perak.

== Early career ==
Anita, was a lecturer at Sultan Idris Education University (Physical Education Department at IPG Campus Ipoh). Then she started learning riding in April 2012 and 2015 she stated her journey to travel the world and she began her journey from Putrajaya on September 11, 2015, taking her ride through Bukit Kayu Hitam on September 16, 2016 and then she returned home a year later.

She was then selected and appointed as Givi ambassador in 2016 after finishing her first trip. She has visited four continents and over 40 countries in 370 days, making it to over 40,000 miles (over 64,000 kms) on a Yamaha FZ150i.

== Current career ==
Anita is currently pursuing a PhD in Sports Science and is a lecturer in the Physical Education Department at IPG Campus Ipoh.

== Awards and honors ==
Bike Solo Ride Across the World (Female)

== Personal life ==
Anita is mother to two sons. Some of her hobbies are; backpacking, overlanding and all manner of outdoor activities. She likes rock and heavy metal music from the 80’s and 90’s and her favorite book is “Anything” by Sidney Sheldon.
