= Anita Álvarez de Williams =

American anthropologist, photographer and historian (born 1931)

- Born: 1931 (age 94–95); Calexico, California, United States
- Occupations: Anthropologist, photographer and historian
- Known for: Cocopah expert
- Notable work: The Cocopah people, Primeros pobladores de la Baja California: introducción a la antropología de la península.

Anita Álvarez de Williams (born 1931) is an American anthropologist, photographer and historian Mexicali-based expert on the Cocopah who wrote the first full-length synthesis of archaeological and ethnographic information on the Baja California peninsula.

Her work has been of great importance to understand the past of Baja California and the borderlands area. She has published The Cocopah People (1974), Travelers among the Cucapa (1975), and Primeros pobladores de la Baja California. Introducción a la antropología de la península (1975), among several books and academic journals both in Mexico and the United States. Her books and articles described natural resource utilization and environmental management, material culture, idea systems, and indigenous history.

Álvarez founded Mexicali’s University Museum and she was director of the Baja California office of the Instituto Nacional Indigenista (INI). She was known for collected and synthesized information on Cocopa ethnohistory and ethnography.

In her publications, Álvarez also narrated how the Colorado River has been dammed, detoured, disputed, and contaminated along its entire course so that it no longer reaches its original destination into the Gulf of California. She concludes by stressing the need everyone has for Colorado river to be conserved and allowed to flow through its delta once again.

== Work ==
- Face and body painting in Baja California: a summary. Pacific Coast Archaeological Society Quarterly. 1973
- Five rock art sites in Baja California south of the 29th parallel. Pacific Coast Archaeological Society Quarterly. 1973
- The Cucapá Indians of the Colorado River delta. Baja California Symposium. 1973
- The Cocopah people. Indian Tribal Series, Phoenix. 1974
- Los Cucapá del delta del Río Colorado. Calafia. 1974
- Primeros pobladores de la Baja California. Gobierno del Estado de Baja California, Mexicali. 1975
- Sea shell usage in Baja California. Pacific Coast Archaeological Society Quarterly. 1975
- Travelers among the Cucapá. Baja California Travels Series 34. Dawson's Book Shop, Los Angeles. 1975
- Assorted facts concerning the eagle in Baja California. Pacific Coast Archaeological Society Quarterly. 1978
- Cocopa. En: Southwest, editado por Alfonso Ortiz, pp. 99–112. Handbook of North American Indians, Vol. 10. Smithsonian Institution, Washington, DC. 1983
- Indian wheat. Baja California Symposium 23. 1985
- Juan de Ugarte. Baja California Symposium 24. 1986
- Environment and edible flora of the Cocopa. Environment Southwest. 1987
- Cocopa beadwork. Pacific Coast Archaeological Society Quarterly. 1991
- Cañon Santa Isabel. Rock Art Papers 10:67–70. San Diego Museum Papers 29. 1993
- Painted caves and sacred sheep: bighorn ethnohistory in Baja California. Counting sheep: 20 ways of seeing desert bighorn. University of Arizona Press, Tucson. 1993
- Cocopah. Native America in the twentieth century: an encyclopedia. Garland Publishing, New York. 1994
- Bark skirts of the Californias. Pacific Coast Archaeological Society Quarterly. 1995
- People and the river. Journal of the Southwest. 1997
- Living with a river. Ponencia en el Quinto Simposio Baja California Indígena, San Diego. 1998
- Primeros pobladores de la Baja California: introducción a la antropología de la península. Conaculta, Mexicali. 2004
