= Anitha =

Anitha is a given name. Notable people with the name include:

- Anitha Kumaraswamy, Indian politician
- Anitha R. Radhakrishnan (born 1952), Indian politician
- Anitha Shaiq, Indian playback singer
- S. Anitha (2000–2017), student

== See also ==
- Anitha, a synonym of the moth genus Polypogon (moth)
