= Anita Gupta =

Indian social entrepreneur and activist

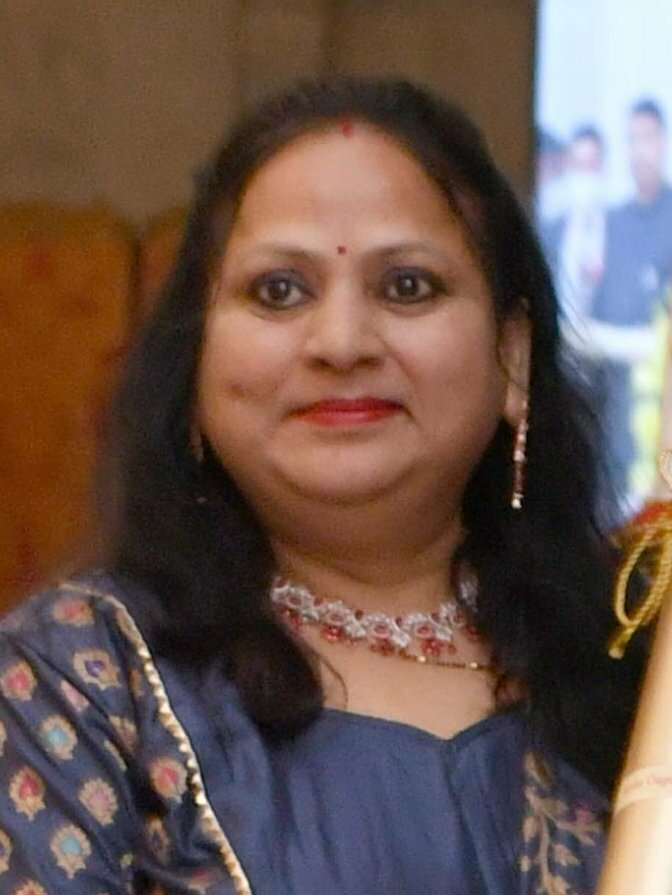
- Gupta in 2022
- Born: c. 1983 (age 42–43)
- Known for: empowering other women

Anita Gupta is an Indian social entrepreneur, organic farmer and tribal activist. She has arranged training for more than 50,000 rural women.

== Life ==
Gupta came from a poor family and she witnessed her grandfather beating a girl he had taken to bear his children. She later said that she thought that if the girl had an education then she would have been empowered to resist his abuse.

She comes from Bhojpur in Bihar where she has arranged training for more than 50,000 rural women in handicrafts, crochet and jewellery.

She and her brother created the organisation Bhojpur Mahila Kala Kendra when she was ten years old in 1993 and Gupta later served as its president. The organisation would encourage women to get involved telling them that if they earned money then they could send their children to school. The organisation was transformed when it registered as a society so that it could receive money from the government. The organisation is located in Arrah and it says it has create employment for 10,000 women. Her organisation gained the Tata Institute of Social Sciences (TISS) and DC Handicrafts as partners.

In 2017 NITI Aayog, the public policy think tank, gave her a "Women Transforming India Award".

On 8 March 2022, she was invited to the Presidential Palace (Rashtrapati Bhawan) in New Delhi to receive the highest award for women in India, the Nari Shakti Puraskar. Because of the COVID-19 pandemic in India, there had been no award in the previous year. There for the government had invited awardees for the previous year and this year. President Ram Nath Kovind gave the award to Gupta and 28 other women. On the night before the award. they got to meet Prime Minister Narendra Modi.
