= Anita Woodley =

American dramatist

- Education: San Francisco State University

Anita Woodley is an American journalist, actress, playwright, literary teaching artist, mixed-media artist, poet, producer, and free jazz vocalist. She grew up in Oakland, California, in housing provided by the Oakland Housing Authority. She attended Oakland Technical High School, where she served as All-Student Body President, PTSA Student Representative, and Youth Commissioner Co-chair for the Mayor of Oakland's Youth Council.

== Theatrical and musical career ==
Woodley has written and performed 10 solo theatrical works, including Bucking The Bull, Mama Juggs, and The Men in Me. She has performed on tours throughout the United States and abroad, notably at the University of Yaounde in Cameroon, West Africa. Themes in Woodley's work include contending with poverty; bullying; obesity; and health issues such as breast cancer, stroke, and heart disease. Her work has appeared at the National Black Theatre Festival and at universities, hospitals, and faith-based communities across the United States.

In 2010, Woodley traveled to Cameroon and reunited with the Tikar tribe from which her mother descends. Woodley was honored by being named Princess Bekang, or “boomerang," in the Chiefdom of the rainforest N’ditam Tikar Village. She was the first African-American descendant since enslavement to return to the N'ditam Tikar village and she learned their native language. Her play Boomerang traces her transformation as a result of her journey.

Woodley is the lead vocalist for N4HC Improvisational Jazz band.

== Journalism and media career ==
Woodley has had a 20-year career in radio and television journalism. She graduated from San Francisco State University's School of Broadcasting, Radio, and Television. While she was a student, she worked for NBC, CBS, and PBS affiliate KMTP. After graduating, she worked as Associate Producer of Domestic News at CNN in Atlanta. After moving to North Carolina, she became a producer at the radio station WUNC, producing the nationally syndicated program The Story with Dick Gordon.

Woodley writes a column for the Durham News, a weekly newspaper published by the Raleigh News and Observer.

== Community advocacy and activism ==
Woodley serves as a Literary/Visual/Improvisational Theatre Teaching/Resident Artist for several school districts in North Carolina, including the Durham, Chapel Hill-Carrboro, and Orange County Public School Districts.

Woodley is the Founder and President of Spark Inner-Action 501(c)(3), a non-profit organization that seeks to promote positive health and lifestyle choices through improvisational performances and presentations to high-risk communities. She is also an Associate Member of the Sisters Network Triangle: an affiliate chapter of the only African-American Women’s National Breast Cancer Survivorship Support Group.

Woodley is also an HIV counselor certified by the state of North Carolina. She addresses the topic of HIV in one of her plays, The Men in Me.

== Awards and honors ==
- Emmy award for Exceptional Coverage of the World Trade Center attacks on September 11, 2001
- Award from Harry Chapin Foundation for Hunger and Poverty in New York
- National Association of Black Journalists Award
- Inaugural Hall of Honor inductee at alma mater Oakland Technical High School (other awardees include Marshawn Lynch, The Pointer Sisters, Rickey Henderson, and Clint Eastwood.)
- Emerging Artist grant from the Durham Arts Council in North Carolina
