= Anita Marshall =

American geologist

Anita Marshall is an American geoscience education researcher and disability activist. She is known for her research on and personal experience with disability in geology.

== Education and career ==
Marshall attended the University of Arkansas, where she earned both a B.S. in Earth Science in 2001, and an M.S. in Geology in 2005. Marshall received her PhD in geology from the University of South Florida. She is a geology lecturer at the University of Florida.

She has been featured in a middle-grade book about scientists with unconventional paths through science, Breaking The Mold, by Dana Levy; and had a small role in a documentary film, Brink of Disaster: Miami Sinking

Marshall has led field trips associated with the Geological Society of America's annual meetings.

== Research and activism ==
Marshall is recognized by the US Business Leadership Network and others as a leader in disability inclusion in STEM. Research has shown that most geoscientists think that physical ability is necessary for a successful career in geology, and disabled people are severely underrepresented in geology. Marshall works to counteract this with her scholarship and activism. After the accident that left her disabled, she decided not to give up on research, even though it was physically challenging. She told PBS NewsHour, "If you think about it, the moon is also inaccessible. Mars is inaccessible. And yet we do science on them anyway."

Marshall is the Executive Director for the International Association for Geoscience Diversity, an American non-profit organization focused on geoscience and disability. She led the GeoSPACE Project, an NSF-funded project that seeks to enable students with limited mobility to participate in geology field work. The research team uses technology and collaborative teamwork to allow for full participation of student with disabilities in the field or working from home.

Marshall is a member of the Choctaw Nation and advocates for increased diversity in STEM across multiple types of identities. As a disabled indigenous woman in geoscience, she represents several groups that are underrepresented in STEM fields.

In 2023, Marshall became an Excellence in JEDI awardee. This award recognizes exemplary contributions in justice, equity, diversity and inclusion in the geosciences through mentorship, scholarly additions that support JEDI, or encouraging communication about these topics.

dMarshall led an accessible field trip to Lost Lake in the San Bernardino National Forest in Southern California in September 2024. The team, which included scientists and students with hearing, vision, and mobility impairments, investigated the region around the San Andreas Fault. Drone footage was used by participants who were unable to visit some sites to observe the environment personally. Restrictions do not hinder effective scientific work, as Marshall noted when he said, "Just because you can’t do it like someone else doesn’t mean you can’t do it."

Additional research includes studying subsurface structures with geophysical techniques, including magnetic surveys.

== Awards ==
- University of Florida College of Liberal Arts and Sciences Excellence in DEI Award, 2023
- EXCEL Media Gold Award for DEI-focused feature article in a national society magazine for the article "Creating Spaces for Geoscientists with Disabilities to Thrive", 2021
- Rising Leader for students with disabilities, DisabilityIN, 2017
