= Anita Mai Tan =

Canadian jewelry designer

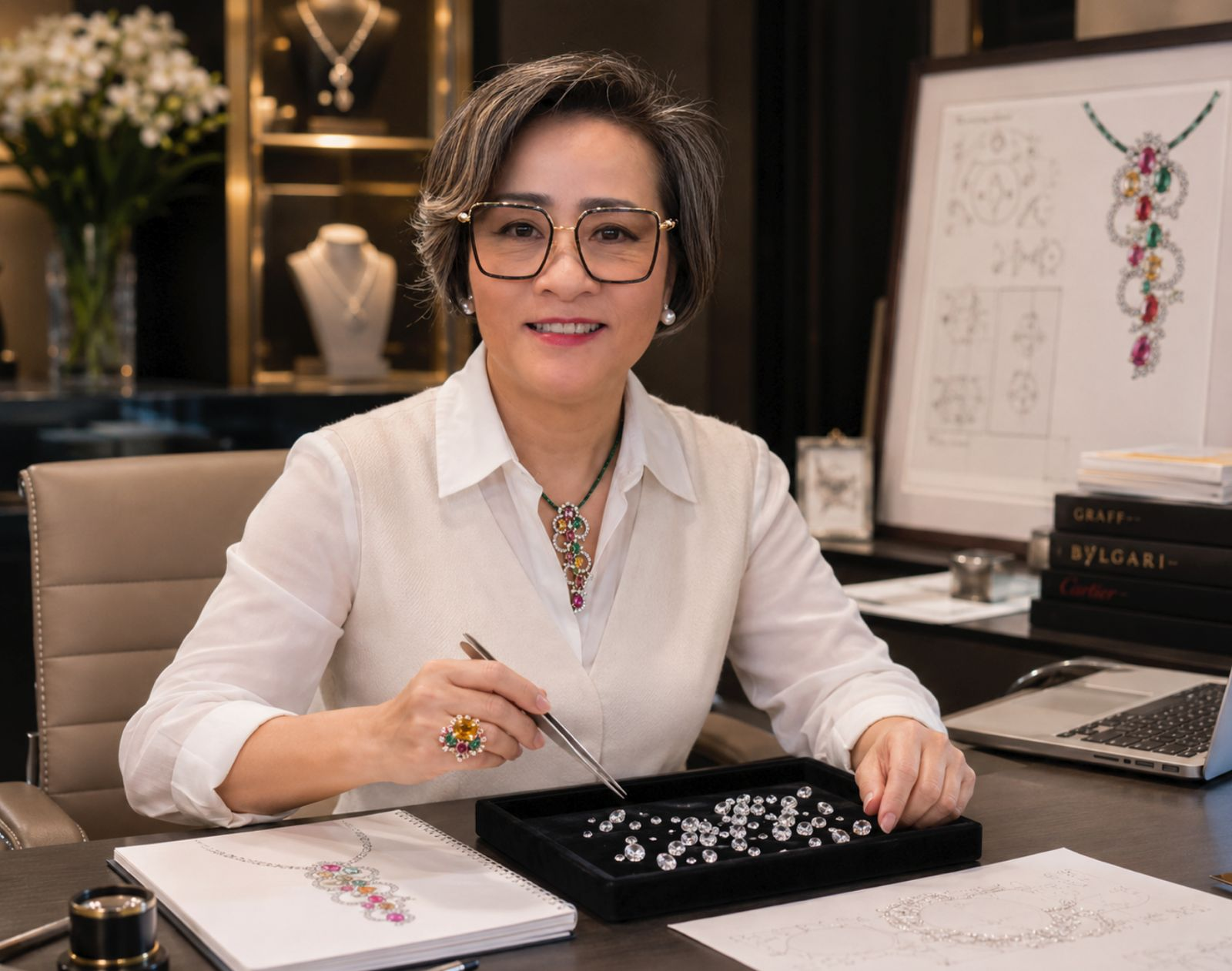
- Anita Mai Tan
- Occupation: Jewelry designer
- Employer: AlGems
- Website: www.algems.com

Anita Mai Tan is a Canadian jewelry designer and the owner and principal designer of AlGems. According to business information provider Datanyze, AlGems has an estimated annual revenue of more than US$50 million and approximately 30 employees. She has designed rings, necklaces, smartphone cases, wine decanters and luxury pens.

Several of her pieces have been produced in support of charitable causes. A "Dragon and Spider" iPhone case, which can also be worn as a necklace, was priced at US$880,000 and offered at a charity auction to support low-income youth remaining in school. It has been described as one of the most expensive phone cases ever made.

Her "Dragon" decanter contains 2,000 grams of 18-karat gold encrusted with diamonds and gemstones totalling 72 carats. Her work has been carried by the Japanese department store Mitsukoshi Ltd.

In 2010, she designed her first luxury pen cover in diamonds and gold. The body of the pen is made of gold adorned with 48 carats of diamonds (1,888 stones), and was priced at €688,000 (approximately US$1.01 million). She also designed a pair of luxury iPhone cases, both in 18-karat gold: the Dragon case is set with 2,200 colourless and coloured diamonds totalling 32 carats, while the Spider case is set with 2,800 colourless and black diamonds totalling 38 carats.

In many of her works, Anita Mai Tan uses animal motifs such as the dragon, horse and spider, as well as floral patterns, and selects the number of stones to match figures regarded as auspicious in Chinese culture.

In 2026, Anita Mai Tan unveiled two high-jewelry writing instruments. The Silver Road of Love, presented as a jeweled pen and pendant set in 18-karat rose gold, was reported to be priced at about US$1.3 million, while a one-off fountain pen, the Imperial Nocturne, was priced at about US$1.68 million.

== Awards ==
In 2026, Anita Mai Tan and AlGems received the Opuluxe Awards title "World-Leading Creator of Bespoke, One-of-One High Jewellery and Museum-Grade Artefacts".
