= Anita Raj (academic) =

American psychologist

- Born: December 29, 1970 (age 55)
- Citizenship: American
- Education: Mississippi College (1991); University of Georgia (1995, 1996)
- Known for: Child Marriage in South Asia
- Children: 2
- Scientific career
- Fields: Child Marriage; Intimate Partner Violence; Reproductive Health; Substance abuse Sexual Violence; Sexual Assault; Gender Equity
- Workplaces: University of California, San Diego; Center on Gender Equity & Health

Anita Raj (born December 29, 1970) is an American developmental psychologist and global public health researcher focused on sexual and reproductive health, maternal and child health, and gender inequalities including gender-based violence, discrimination and bias. Until 2023, Raj was the Tata Chancellor Professor of Society and Health and was a professor in the Departments of Medicine and Education Studies at the University of California, San Diego. Raj was also the Founding Director of UCSD's Center on Gender Equity and Health. In 2023, Raj was named the Executive Director of the Newcomb Institute at Tulane University. In 2025, Raj was elected to the National Academy of Medicine.

== Education ==
She earned a B.S. in biology (1991) from Mississippi College, and an M.S. (1995) and Ph.D. (1996) in psychology from the University of Georgia. She completed post-doctoral work at the University of Alabama, the University of Georgia, and the Boston University School of Public Health.

== Career ==
=== Research ===
Raj's research interests include development and evaluation of sexual, reproductive and maternal-child behavioral health interventions for socially vulnerable populations; assessment of gendered, social and cultural vulnerabilities for sexual and reproductive health concerns, intimate partner violence, and child marriage; and measurement of structural and systems level gender inequalities in health. This work includes studies in South Asia, Sub-Saharan Africa, Russia and the United States.

She is a research scientist trained in developmental psychology. Her research includes epidemiological and qualitative assessment of gendered, social, and cultural vulnerabilities, specializing in reproductive, maternal, neonatal, child, and adolescent health concerns across national settings; assessment of etiology and public health impact of gender inequities including early and child marriage, intimate partner violence and sexual assault, and son preference; development and evaluation of HIV, unintended pregnancy, and gender-based violence prevention interventions in low resource settings with socially vulnerable populations including minorities, people contending with problem substance use, and youth; and application of social and behavioral theories, including gender theories for measurement development and evaluation research. She is a widely published, recognized, and cited psychologists with hundreds of published articles. She is well known for her child marriage work in South Asia. In 2014 she was an invited panelist, asked to speak on child, early and forced marriage at the United Nations General Assembly in New York, NY. Additionally, Raj has advised several organizations, including the World Health Organization, the Bill and Melinda Gates Foundation, and the Blue Shield Foundation of California, on gender-based issues, mental health, and gender equality. Raj has implemented her understanding of developmental psychology into programs such as EMERGE, a program she had founded and currently directs, and VEX, measuring data of how people in state- and nation-wide populations are progressing. Then, the observations are assessed, helping to determine the need for more beneficial programs within the area. According to Tulane University, Raj had authorized approximately 375 peer reviewed publications and is recognized as one of the most cited social scientists globally.

=== Media ===
Raj's work has been covered by popular media including the New York Times, NPR, the New York Post, and USA Today.

- "Pervasive Sexual Harassment Why #MeToo Took Off Poll" - New York Times
- "How Chickens and Goats Are Helping to Stop Child Marriage" - NPR, Goats and Soda
- "A New Survey Finds Eighty-Percent of Women Have Experienced Sexual Harassment" - NPR, The Two Way
- "WHO Finds Violence Against Women in 'Shockingly' Common" - NPR, Shots
- "Nearly All Hollywood Women Say They've Been Sexually Harassed" - New York Post
- "Modern Family Planning In India" - Science Daily
- "Jama Study Child Marriages India, Nepal, Pakistan, Bangladesh" - Asian Scientist
- "How Common Sexual Misconduct in Hollywood" - USA Today
- "Tata Trusts and University of California San Diego partner to establish Tata Institute for Active Genetics and Society (TIAGS)" - PR Newswire, Cision

=== Publications ===
- Raj, A; Saggurti, N; Balaiah, D; Silverman, JG (2009). "Prevalence of child marriage and its effect on fertility and fertility-control outcomes of young women in India: a cross-sectional, observational study". Lancet. 373 (9678): 1883–9. doi:10.1016/S0140-6736(09)60246-4. PMC 2759702. PMID 19278721.
- Raj, A (2010). "When the mother is a child: the impact of child marriage on the health and human rights of girls". Archives of Disease in Childhood. 95 (11): 931–5. doi:10.1136/adc.2009.178707. PMID 20930011. S2CID 41625496.
- Amaro, H; Raj, A (2000). "On the Margin: Power and Women's HIV Risk Reduction Strategies". Sex Roles. 42 (7): 723–49. doi:10.1023/A:1007059708789. S2CID 141250908.
- Raj, A; Silverman, JG (2002). "Violence against immigrant women: The roles of culture, context, and legal status on intimate partner violence". Violence Against Women. 8 (3): 367–98. doi:10.1177/10778010222183107. S2CID 73190341.
- Silverman, JG; Decker, MR; Reed, E; Raj, A (2006). "Intimate partner violence victimization prior to and during pregnancy among women residing in 26 US states: associations with maternal and neonatal health". American Journal of Obstetrics and Gynecology. 195 (1): 140–8. doi:10.1016/j.ajog.2005.12.052. PMID 16813751.
