= Anita Nyberg =

- Born: 1940 (age 85–86)

Academic work
- Discipline: gender studies
- Institutions: Stockholm University

Anita Nyberg (born 1940) is a Swedish professor emerita in Gender Perspectives in Work and Economics at the Centre for Gender Studies at Stockholm University. She was Secretary of the Swedish Committee on the Distribution of Economic Power and Economic Resources between Women and Men ("Kvinnomaktutredningen").
