= Anita Coleman =

American librarian

Anita Coleman is an academic librarian, faculty and researcher in digital libraries. Coleman's research focuses on the design and organization, user behaviors and evaluation, of complex systems and interdisciplinary information infrastructures. These include digital libraries, knowledge organization systems, and open access digital repositories. Her research investigates the representation of anti-racism in Library of Congress Subject Headings and library catalogs. She is the founder of the interdisciplinary open access repository, dLIST - Digital Library of Information Science and Technology.

== Awards ==
"2007 Mover and Shaker" -Library Journal

2007 Outstanding Teacher. (University of Arizona, School of Information Resources and Library Science)

2006 Professional Service (Library of Congress and American Library Association, Association for Library Cataloging and Technical Services)

1998 Research - California Academic & Research Libraries

1996-2007 Professional Service - Learning Resources Association of the California Community Colleges.

== Publications ==
- 1996. Coleman, Anita (1996). "Public Performances and Private Acts". Journal of Education for Library and Information Science. 37 (4): 325–342. doi:10.2307/40324241. hdl:10150/105049. JSTOR 40324241.
- 1996. The H-Journal: A Tool to Support Information Work. The New Review of Hypermedia and Multimedia Applications and Research, Vol. 2, pp. 89 – 105.
- 2001. Coleman, Anita S.; Smith, Terence R.; Buchel, Olha A.; Mayer, Richard E. (2001). "Learning Spaces in Digital Libraries". Research and Advanced Technology for Digital Libraries. Lecture Notes in Computer Science. Vol. 2163. pp. 251–262. doi:10.1007/3-540-44796-2_22. ISBN 978-3-540-42537-3.
- 2001. Smith, Terence R.; Janee, Greg; Frew, James; Coleman, Anita (2001). "The Alexandria digital earth prototype". Proceedings of the first ACM/IEEE-CS joint conference on Digital libraries - JCDL '01. pp. 118–119. doi:10.1145/379437.379463. ISBN 978-1-58113-345-5. S2CID 12375394.
- 2002. Coleman, Anita S. (August 2002). "Scientific Models as Works". Cataloging & Classification Quarterly. 33 (3–4): 129–159. doi:10.1300/J104v33n03_07. hdl:10150/106312. S2CID 62699903.
- 2002. Interdisciplinarity: The Road Ahead for Digital Library Education. D-Lib Magazine. Interdisciplinarity: The Road Ahead for Education in Digital Libraries
- 2002. The Design and Evaluation of Interactivities in a Digital Library. D-Lib Magazine. The Design and Evaluation of Interactivities in a Digital Library
- 2002. Interactional Digital Libraries. With Maliaca Oxnam. Journal of Digital Information.
- 2003. How Can Classificatory Structures be used to improve science education? With Olha Buchel. Learning Resources & Technical Services Vol. 42, Iss. 1, pp. 4 – 15.
- 2004. "A Code for Classifiers": Whatever Happened to Merrill's Code? Knowledge Organization Vol. 31, pp. 161 – 76.
- 2004. Guide to Selecting and Cataloging Quality WWW Resources for the Small Library. Fairfield, CA; Learning Resources Association of California Community Colleges.
- 2004. Bricoleurs: exploring digital library evaluation as participant interactions, research, and processes. With Laura M Bartolo, Casey Jones. Joint Conference on Digital Libraries.
- 2004. Digital Libraries and User Needs: Negotiating the Future. With Tamara Sumner. Journal of Digital Information.
- 2005. Coleman, Anita S. (9 September 2005). "From Cataloging to Metadata: Dublin Core Records for the Library Catalog". Cataloging & Classification Quarterly. 40 (3–4): 153–181. doi:10.1300/J104v40n03_08. S2CID 62690448.
- 2005. Open Access Federation for Library and Information Science. D-Lib Magazine. Open Access Federation for Library and Information Science: dLIST and DL-Harvest
- 2005. Coleman, Anita (15 February 2005). "Instruments of cognition: Use of citations and Web links in online teaching materials". Journal of the American Society for Information Science and Technology. 56 (4): 382–392. doi:10.1002/asi.20125. hdl:10150/105215.
- 2005. Impact: the last frontier in digital library evaluation. With Laura M Bartolo, Casey Jones. Joint Conference on Digital Libraries.
- 2005. Copyright transfer agreements and self-archiving. With Cheryl Knott Malone. Joint Conference on Digital Libraries.
- 2006. Coleman, Anita S. (1 July 2006). "William Stetson Merrill and bricolage for information studies". Journal of Documentation. 62 (4): 462–481. doi:10.1108/00220410610673855. hdl:10150/105517.
- 2006. A Common Sense Approach to Defining Data, Information, and Metadata. With Dimitri Dervos. Knowledge Organization for a Global Learning Society: Advances in Knowledge Organization.
- 2006. Kraft, Donald; Rasmussen, Edie; Hastings, Samantha; Coleman, Anita (10 October 2007). "Competing information realities: Digital libraries, repositories, and the commons". Proceedings of the American Society for Information Science and Technology. 43 (1): 1–8. doi:10.1002/meet.14504301134. hdl:10150/105213.
- 2007. Self-Archiving and the Copyright Transfer Agreements of ISI-Ranked Library and Information Science Journals. Journal of the American Society for Information Science and Technology Vol. 58 Iss. 2, pp. 286–296.
- 2007. Assessing the Value of a Journal beyond the Impact Factor. Journal of the American Society for Information Science and Technology, Vol. 58, Iss. 2, pp. 286 – 296.
- 2020. Coleman, Anita. “Using the Anti-Racism Digital Library and Thesaurus to Understand Information Access, Authority, Value and Privilege.” Theological Librarianship 13 (1): 1–12.
- 2024. Coleman, Anita S. “International Contexts and U.S. Trends in Equity, Diversity, Inclusion, and Accessibility in Libraries.” Library Trends 71, no. 2: 254–83.
