= Anita Calvert Lebourgeoise =

American judge (1879–1940)

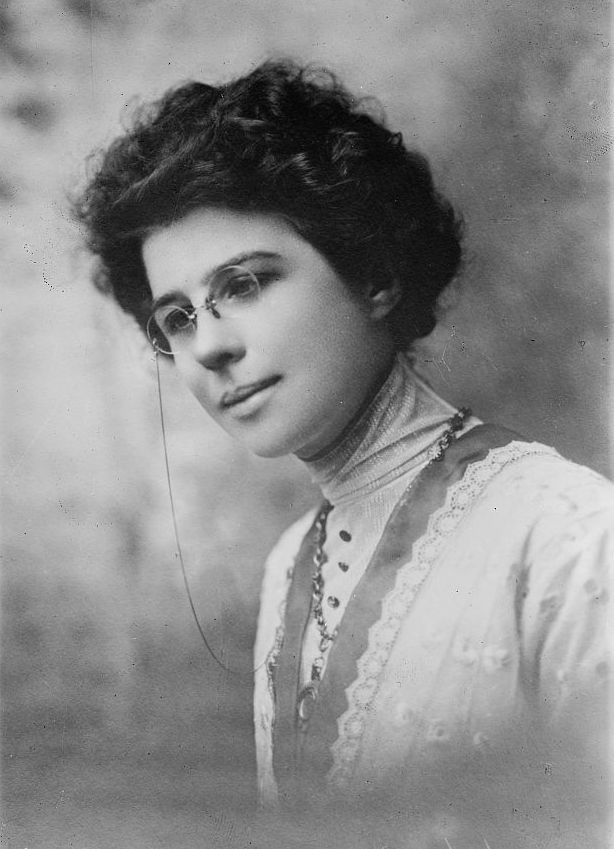
- Lebourgeoise, circa 1910
- Born: Anita Calvert; October 8, 1879; Lonedell, Missouri, U.S.
- Died: March 18, 1940 (aged 60); Los Angeles, California, U.S.
- Education: Massachusetts State Law School
- Occupations: Attorney, Politician, Suffragist

Anita Calvert Lebourgeois (October 8, 1879 – March 18, 1940) was an attorney, judge, genealogist, biographer and women's suffrage orator. At the time, she was the only woman genealogist, or historian of ancestry, in Minnesota.

== Early life ==
She was born on October 8, 1879, in Lonedell, Missouri, as Anita Calvert. Her mother's maiden name was Jones. From both her father and mother's sides, she was a descendant of the royal families of House of Bourbon and Le Tournure of France. She was the great-grand niece of James Buchanan, 15th President of the United States and a direct descendant of the Calverts, Baron Baltimore. At an early age Calvert was adopted by her uncle, Earl M. Fairfax, who gave her every opportunity in the way of an education, a part of which was received at Wellesley College, where she took a special course in genealogy and later entered the Girls' Finishing School at Hartfordbury, Lancashire, England.

She was a graduate of the Massachusetts State Law School, one of the first women in the New England States to advocate the Juvenile Law. By doing newspaper work she made her way through law school because of her uncle's disapproval of women taking up this study.

== Career ==
Just before a presidential election in New York, Calvert heard of a Tammany Hall meeting that the newspapers were anxious to report, but to which their representatives were denied admission. Presenting herself to the editor of the New York Journal she asked for an assignment covering this political work. "I can repeat what I hear, and may be able to hear what another could not". She climbed a fire escape, hid in a locker in the room where the meeting was held with the help of the janitor, and made such an excellent report that later an ex-Governor of New York held as one of his most treasured possessions the white sailor hat, white shirtwaist and skirt on which she took notes, because she forgot to bring paper.

Calvert participated in the presidential campaigns for William Jennings Bryan, in 1896, and Woodrow Wilson, in 1912, and was the only woman who took part in the campaign of Woodrow Wilson in Missouri. He wrote her after the election: "I want to express my appreciation of the active and intelligent work you have done. As a leader of the party I feel that I owe you a direct personal expression of sincere thanks".

Calvert was an advocate of Women's suffrage in the United States and traveled 102,000 miles in four years to campaign for it. She spoke before the Senate of four States, and once she was told by a Secretary of State, opposed to suffrage, that as soon as the women of his State produced something they would receive the franchise. To this she replied: "The women of your State, in fact of the world, produced first the men of the world — who can produce more?"

"Those who do not look upon themselves as a link connecting the past with the future do not perform their duty to the world."

— Anita Calvert Lebourgeoise

In March 1913, Calvert founded her own paper, The Invincible Magazine of History and Biography, the only publication of its kind edited by a woman. Her purpose was to promote the standard of American aristocracy of birth by bringing to light many hundreds of pedigrees of prominent men and women in the high places in the United States.

Calvert became also the editor of the Universal Cause magazine, taking up both sides of the suffrage question, the first number of which appeared January 1, 1914.

== Personal life ==
Anita Calvert's first husband was George M. Tyler, an attorney of New York. They were married in 1900 and had one daughter, Anita Fairfax, who died at the early age of five years. After being a widow for seven years, Calvert married Adolph A. Bourgeoise, who had been her first sweetheart. He was a member of the St. Louis Symphony Society and a good musician.

Calvert died on Maerh 18, 1940, in Los Angeles.
