= Anita Rachlis =

Canadian physician

Anita Rachlis, M.D. is a Canadian HIV/AIDS researcher and is the principal author of the HIV treatment guidelines in Canada. She is an associate scientist at the Sunnybrook Research Institute, Sunnybrook Health Sciences Centre, in Toronto, Ontario, Canada.

Dr. Rachlis is the recipient of awards from Sunnybrook Hospital and the Association of Medical Microbiology and Infectious Disease Canada and is also a member of Canada's Ministerial Council of HIV/AIDS.

== Education ==
- MD, 1972, University of Toronto
- FRCP(C), 1976, Internal Medicine, University of Toronto
- Certificate of Special Competence, 1983, Infectious Disease, University of Toronto
- M.Ed., 1994, Ontario Institute for Studies in Education, University of Toronto

== Appointments and affiliations ==
- Associate scientist, clinical integrative biology - trauma, emergency and critical care program, Sunnybrook Research Institute
- Professor (cross-appointment), department of laboratory medicine and pathobiology, University of Toronto
- Professor, division of infectious diseases, department of medicine, University of Toronto
- Clerkship director, undergraduate medical program, faculty of medicine, University of Toronto

== Awards and honors ==
In September 2003 Rachlis was made a member of Canada's Ministerial Council of HIV/AIDS. In 2004, the Sunnybrook Health Sciences Centre gave her an award in recognition of her outstanding contributions to inpatient teaching. In 2014, Dr. Rachlis was awarded the Distinguished Service Award "in recognition of her many years of service to AMMI Canada as Chair and member of the Education/ Continuing Professional Development Committee and for her contributions to HIV care and research in Canada since the beginning of the HIV/AIDS epidemic" by the Association of Medical Microbiology and Infectious Disease Canada.

== Research ==
Rachlis's research is focussed on HIV-related clinical work. Her research interests are in the care and treatment of patients with HIV infection. She has been involved in clinical research on antiretroviral agents, prophylaxis, and treatment of opportunistic infections. Her other area of interest is in medical education related to continuing education for infectious diseases and HIV infection and undergraduate medical education.

Year	AZT	ddI	ddC	d4T	NVP	EFZ	IDV
1998							
