= Anita Pipan =

Slovenian diplomat

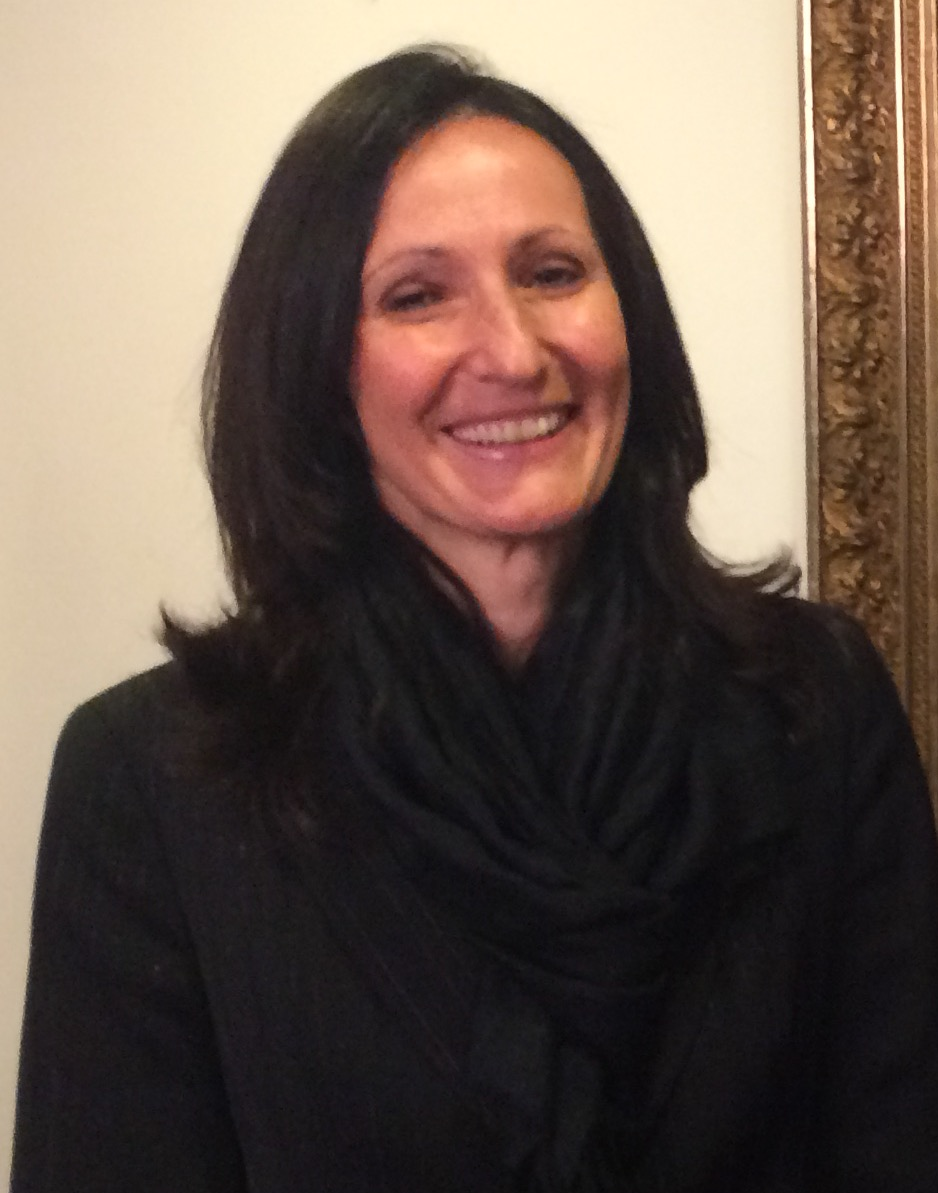
Anita Pipan 2015

Anita Pipan (born 1970 in Ljubljana) is a Slovenian diplomat who is the Director-General at the Directorate for Multilateral Affairs and Development Cooperation of the Ministry of Foreign Affairs. She has also served as ambassador to the African Union, Luxembourg, Belgium, and Greece.
