= Anita Ontiveros =

- Born: 23 September 1947; Buenos Aires, Argentina
- Died: 3 January 2024 (aged 76); Santo Domingo, Dominican Republic
- Occupation: Television producer

Anita Ontiveros (23 September 1947 – 3 January 2024) was an Argentinian television producer.

== Biography ==
Ontiveros left Argentina in 1966, together with her husband and tango partner Horacio Lamadrid. They arrived in the Dominican Republic as tango dancers. She and Horacio both later became involved in television production.

She was the country’s first female camera director, notably directing the 1977 Miss Universe in the Dominican Republic, where she lived for 56 years. She worked at Color Vision, Tele Antillas, Radio Televisión Dominicana, Rahintel, Super Canal 33 among other companies.

In January 2024, she died from Alzheimer's disease. Her husband died in September 2024. She is survived by her two children Samantha and Horacio “Horacito”.
