= Shooting at the 1984 Summer Olympics – Women's 50 metre rifle three positions =

Sports shooting at the Olympics

Women's 50 metre rifle three positions at the Games of the XXIII Olympiad
- Venue: Los Angeles, United States
- Date: August 2, 1984
- Competitors: 27 from 17 nations

Medalists
1st place, gold medalist(s)		Wu Xiaoxuan	China
2nd place, silver medalist(s)		Ulrike Holmer	West Germany
3rd place, bronze medalist(s)		Wanda Jewell	United States

The women's 50 metre rifle three positions was a shooting sports event held as part of the Shooting at the 1984 Summer Olympics programme. It was the first time the event was held for women at the Olympics. The competition was held on August 2, 1984 at the shooting ranges in Los Angeles. 27 shooters from 17 nations competed.

== Results ==
Place	Shooter	Total
1	Wu Xiaoxuan (CHN)	581
2	Ulrike Holmer (FRG)	578
3	Wanda Jewell (USA)	578
4	Gloria Parmentier (USA)	576
5	Anne Grethe Jeppesen (NOR)	574
6	Jin Dongxiang (CHN)	571
7	Biserka Vrbek (YUG)	569
8	Mirjana Jovovic-Horvat (YUG)	569
9	Christina Gustafsson (SWE)	569
10	Sarah Cooper (GBR)	568
11	Noriko Kosai (JPN)	568
12T	Sigrid Lang (FRG)	567
12T	Sirpa Ylönen (FIN)	567
14	Margareta Gustafsson (SWE)	565
15	Karin Bauer (AUT)	564
16	Dominique Esnault (FRA)	563
17T	Soma Dutta (IND)	562
17T	Siri Landsem (NOR)	562
19	Sharon Bowes (CAN)	559
20T	Tiranan Khajornklinmala (THA)	558
20T	Kim Yeong-mi (KOR)	558
22	Christina Ashcroft (CAN)	554
23	Yvette Courault (FRA)	553
24	Ko Young-hee (KOR)	552
25	Irene Daw (GBR)	551
26	Sylvia Muehlberg (AUS)	549
27	Gladys de Seminario (PER)	540
