= Shooting at the 1992 Summer Olympics – Women's 10 metre air rifle =

Sports shooting at the Olympics

Women's 10 metre air rifle at the Games of the XXV Olympiad
- Venue: Mollet del Vallès
- Competitors: 45 from 28 nations
- Winning score: 498.2 (OR)

Medalists
| 1st place, gold medalist(s) | | Yeo Kab-soon | South Korea |
| 2nd place, silver medalist(s) | | Vesela Letcheva | Bulgaria |
| 3rd place, bronze medalist(s) | | Aranka Binder | Independent Olympic Participants |

Women's 10 metre air rifle was one of the thirteen shooting events at the 1992 Summer Olympics. It was the first Olympic competition after the introduction of the new target in 1989, and thus two Olympic records were set. Vesela Letcheva and Yeo Kab-soon shared the pre-final lead with 396 points, and Yeo outperformed Letcheva by almost three points in the final.

== Qualification round ==
| Rank | Athlete | Country | Score | Notes |
|---|---|---|---|---|
| 1 | Vesela Letcheva | Bulgaria | 396 | Q OR |
| 2 | Yeo Kab-soon | South Korea | 396 | Q OR |
| 3 | Valentina Cherkasova | Unified Team | 394 | Q |
| 4 | Dagmar Bilková | Czechoslovakia | 393 | Q |
| 5 | Aranka Binder | Independent Olympic Participants | 393 | Q |
| 6 | Mirjana Horvat | Bosnia and Herzegovina | 393 | Q |
| 7 | Eva Forian | Hungary | 392 | Q (4th: 99) |
| 8 | Lee Eun-ju | South Korea | 392 | Q (4th: 98; 3rd: 99) |
| 9 | Silvia Sperber | Germany | 392 | (4th: 98; 3rd: 98) |
| 10 | Anitsa Valkova | Bulgaria | 392 | (4th: 97) |
| 11 | Anna Maloukhina | Unified Team | 391 | |
| 11 | Launi Meili | United States | 391 | |
| 11 | Debra Sinclair | United States | 391 | |
| 11 | Xu Yanhua | China | 391 | |
| 15 | Jasminka Francki | Croatia | 390 | |
| 15 | Éva Joó | Hungary | 390 | |
| 17 | Christine Bontemps | France | 389 | |
| 17 | Sabina Fuchs | Switzerland | 389 | |
| 17 | Lenka Koloušková | Czechoslovakia | 389 | |
| 17 | Renata Mauer | Poland | 389 | |
| 17 | Lidija Mihajlović | Independent Olympic Participants | 389 | |
| 17 | Jolande Swinkels | Netherlands | 389 | |
| 23 | Małgorzata Książkiewicz | Poland | 388 | |
| 23 | Suzana Skoko | Croatia | 388 | |
| 23 | Hanne Vataker | Norway | 388 | |
| 26 | Sharon Bowes | Canada | 387 | |
| 26 | Gaby Bühlmann | Switzerland | 387 | |
| 26 | Nieves Fernandez Mata | Spain | 387 | |
| 26 | Carla Cristina Ribeiro | Portugal | 387 | |
| 30 | Sonja Pfeilschifter | Germany | 386 | |
| 31 | Christina Ashcroft | Canada | 385 | |
| 31 | Karin Biva | Belgium | 385 | |
| 31 | Zhang Qiuping | China | 385 | |
| 34 | Annette Sattel | France | 384 | |
| 35 | Soma Dutta | India | 383 | |
| 35 | Aikaterini Kotroni | Greece | 383 | |
| 37 | Noriko Kosai | Japan | 382 | |
| 37 | Pushpamali Ramanayake | Sri Lanka | 382 | |
| 39 | Cristina Fernández | Spain | 381 | |
| 39 | Yoko Minamoto | Japan | 381 | |
| 39 | Fabienne Pasetti | Monaco | 381 | |
| 42 | Pirjo Peltola | Finland | 380 | |
| 43 | Shahana Parveen | Bangladesh | 379 | |
| 44 | Lindy Hansen | Norway | 377 | |
| 45 | Anita Shrestha | Nepal | 374 | |

OR Olympic record – Q Qualified for final

== Final ==
| Rank | Athlete | Qual | Final | Total | Notes |
|---|---|---|---|---|---|
| 1st place, gold medalist(s) | Yeo Kab-soon (KOR) | 396 | 102.2 | 498.2 | OR |
| 2nd place, silver medalist(s) | Vesela Letcheva (BUL) | 396 | 99.3 | 495.3 | |
| 3rd place, bronze medalist(s) | Aranka Binder (IOP) | 393 | 102.1 | 495.1 | |
| 4 | Dagmar Bilková (TCH) | 393 | 101.9 | 494.9 | |
| 5 | Valentina Cherkasova (EUN) | 394 | 100.6 | 494.6 | |
| 6 | Lee Eun-ju (KOR) | 392 | 100.6 | 492.6 | |
| 7 | Eva Forian (HUN) | 392 | 100.4 | 492.4 | |
| 8 | Mirjana Horvat (BIH) | 393 | 98.6 | 491.6 | |

OR Olympic record

== Sources ==
- Games of the XXV Olympiad Barcelona 1992: The results (PDF).
