= Ann-Cristin Vuolo Junros =

Swedish air rifle shooter (born 1962)

Ann‑Cristin Vuolo Junros
Personal information
- Nationality: Swedish
- Born: Ann‑Cristin Wuolo; September 4, 1962 (age 63) Sweden
- Occupation: Sport shooter

Sport
- Country: Sweden
- Sport: 10 m air rifle
- Club: Gillets SpS
Medal record
Shooting
Swedish Master
Gold medal – first place	1979	10 m air rifle
Gold medal – first place	1986	10 m air rifle
Gold medal – first place	1988	10 m air rifle
Gold medal – first place	1990	10 m air rifle
European Master
Representing Sweden
Silver medal – second place	1986	10 m air rifle

Ann‑Cristin Vuolo Junros (born Ann‑Cristin Wuolo; 4 September 1962) is a Swedish professional sport shooter, primarily competing in 10 m air rifle. She competed for clubs, including Malmberget-Kos SF and Gillets SpS, and became Swedish champion in the discipline in 1979, 1986, 1988 and 1990. She also gained international attention for her European Championships silver and VC ranking and record performances.

== Career ==
Vuolo Junros won the Swedish Championships in 10 m air rifle in 1979, 1986, 1988, and 1990.

At the European Championships in 10 m air rifle in 1986, held in Espoo, Finland, she, together with Anita Karlsson and Anette Olsson, placed second and won the silver medal for Sweden.

In 1988, she achieved a record 396 points in the women's 10 m air rifle event (40 shots, maximum score of 400 points). This performance earned her an entry in the Guinness World Records. At the World Shooting Championships in 1990 in Moscow, Vuolo Junros placed 15th with 389 points.

== Achievements ==
- SM‑gold in 10 m air rifle: 1979, 1986, 1988, 1990
- EC‑silver in 10 m air rifle: 1986
- Record performance: 396 points in 10 m air rifle, 1988

== Legacy ==
Vuolo Junros's name is still cited in modern 10 m air rifle shooting. An article in Norrländska Socialdemokraten (NSD) highlights how today's young shooting talents refer to her achievements and legacy.
