= Shooting at the 1988 Summer Olympics – Women's 10 metre air rifle =

Sports shooting at the Olympics

Women's 10 metre air rifle at the Games of the XXIV Olympiad
- Date: 18 September 1988
- Competitors: 45 from 29 nations
- Winning score: 498.5 (OR)

Medalists
1st place, gold medalist(s)		Irina Shilova	Soviet Union
2nd place, silver medalist(s)		Silvia Sperber	West Germany
3rd place, bronze medalist(s)		Anna Maloukhina	Soviet Union

Women's 10 metre air rifle was one of the thirteen shooting events at the 1988 Summer Olympics. It was the second installment of the event.

The medals for the competition were presented by He Zhenliang, IOC Member, China; and the medalists' bouquets were presented by Olegario Vázquez Raña, ISU President; Mexico.

== Qualification round ==
Rank	Athlete	Country	Score	Notes
1	Launi Meili	United States	395	Q OR
2	Irina Shilova	Soviet Union	395	Q OR
3	Zhang Qiuping	China	395	Q OR
4	Anna Maloukhina	Soviet Union	394	Q
5	Sharon Bowes	Canada	394	Q
6	Gaby Bühlmann	Switzerland	394	Q
7	Silvia Sperber	West Germany	393	Q (4th: 99)
8	Pirjo Peltola	Finland	393	Q (4th: 99)
9	Sylvia Baldessarini	Austria	393	(4th: 96)
10	Deena Wigger	United States	392	
11	Éva Joó	Hungary	392	
12	Eva Forian	Hungary	391	
12	Kang Hye-ja	South Korea	391	
12	Nonka Matova	Bulgaria	391	
15	Irene Dufaux	Switzerland	390	
15	Li Dan	China	390	
17	Carmen Giese	West Germany	389	
17	Vesela Letcheva	Bulgaria	389	
17	Yoko Minamoto	Japan	389	
20	Dominique Aupretre	France	388	
20	Valerie Malet	France	388	
22	Christina Schulze-Ashcroft	Canada	387	
22	Alison Feast	Australia	387	
22	Carina Jansson	Sweden	387	
22	Lenka Koloušková	Czechoslovakia	387	
22	Mladenka Malenica	Yugoslavia	387	
22	Anne Grethe Stormorken	Netherlands	387	
28	Karin Biva	Belgium	386	
28	Zeynep Oka	Turkey	386	
30	Dagmar Bilková	Czechoslovakia	385	
30	Soma Dutta	India	385	
30	Lee Mi-kyung	South Korea	385	
33	Sarah Cooper	Great Britain	383	
33	Anita Karlsson	Sweden	383	
33	Barbara Troger	Austria	383	
36	Siri Landsem	Norway	382	
37	Katja Klepp	East Germany	381	
38	Kyoko Kinoshita	Japan	380	
39	Liou Yuh-ju	Chinese Taipei	379	
39	May-Irene Olsen	Norway	379	
41	Sirpa Ylönen	Finland	377	
41	Flavia Zanfra	Italy	377	
43	Fabienne Diato	Monaco	375	
43	Parbati Thapa	Nepal	375	
45	Jeanne Lopes	Netherlands Antilles	364	

OR Olympic record – Q Qualified for final

== Final ==
Rank	Athlete	Qual	Final	Total	Notes
1st place, gold medalist(s)	Irina Shilova (URS)	395	103.5	498.5	OR
2nd place, silver medalist(s)	Silvia Sperber (FRG)	393	104.5	497.5	
3rd place, bronze medalist(s)	Anna Maloukhina (URS)	394	101.8	495.8	
4	Zhang Qiuping (CHN)	395	99.7	494.7	
5	Pirjo Peltola (FIN)	393	100.6	493.6	
6	Launi Meili (USA)	395	98.3	493.3	
7	Sharon Bowes (CAN)	394	99.1	493.1	
8	Gaby Bühlmann (SUI)	394	99.0	493.0	

OR Olympic record

== Sources ==
- XXIVth Olympiad Seoul 1988 Official Report – Volume 2 Part 2 (PDF).
