= Shooting at the 1992 Summer Olympics – Women's 50 metre rifle three positions =

Sports shooting at the Olympics

Women's 50 metre rifle three positions at the Games of the XXV Olympiad
- Venue: Mollet del Vallès
- Competitors: 36 from 21 nations
- Winning score: 684.3 (OR)

Medalists
1st place, gold medalist(s)		Launi Meili	United States
2nd place, silver medalist(s)		Nonka Matova	Bulgaria
3rd place, bronze medalist(s)		Małgorzata Książkiewicz	Poland

Women's 50 metre rifle three positions (then known as standard rifle) was one of the thirteen shooting events at the 1992 Summer Olympics. It was the first Olympic competition after the introduction of the new target in 1989, and thus two Olympic records were set, both by Launi Meili.

== Qualification round ==
Rank	Athlete	Country	Prone	Stand	Kneel	Total	Notes
1	Launi Meili	United States	200	194	193	587	Q OR
2	Małgorzata Książkiewicz	Poland	195	191	199	585	Q
3	Nonka Matova	Bulgaria	200	190	194	584	Q
4	Eva Forian	Hungary	199	189	194	582	Q
5	Vessela Letcheva	Bulgaria	199	187	195	581	Q
6	Suzana Skoko	Croatia	196	191	193	580	Q
7	Sharon Bowes	Canada	198	189	193	580	Q
8	Éva Joó	Hungary	198	191	191	580	Q
9	Lenka Koloušková	Czechoslovakia	198	184	197	579	
10	Zhang Qiuping	China	196	190	193	579	
11	Zhou Danhong	China	199	188	192	579	
12	Jasminka Francki	Croatia	196	188	194	578	
12	Ann-Marie Pfiffner	United States	193	191	194	578	
14	Christina Ashcroft	Canada	196	189	192	577	
14	Aleksandra Ivošev	Independent Olympic Participants	198	189	190	577	
14	Renata Mauer	Poland	198	189	190	577	
17	Sabina Fuchs	Switzerland	196	188	192	576	
17	Mirjana Horvat	Bosnia and Herzegovina	194	186	196	576	
19	Irina Chilova	Unified Team	198	187	190	575	
20	Silvia Sperber	Germany	192	188	194	574	
21	Anna Maloukhina	Unified Team	197	188	188	573	
22	Soma Dutta	India	194	192	186	572	
22	Hanne Vataker	Norway	197	183	192	572	
24	Dagmar Bilková	Czechoslovakia	197	181	193	571	
24	Nieves Fernandez Mata	Spain	196	184	191	571	
24	Gang Myeong-a	South Korea	196	182	193	571	
27	Pirjo Peltola	Finland	198	184	188	570	
28	Gaby Bühlmann	Switzerland	194	185	190	569	
28	Sonja Pfeilschifter	Germany	195	188	186	569	
30	Dominique Esnault	France	198	180	189	567	
30	Noriko Kosai	Japan	196	184	187	567	
32	Isabelle Héberlé	France	196	178	192	566	
33	Lidija Mihajlović	Independent Olympic Participants	192	182	191	565	
34	Yoko Minamoto	Japan	193	183	187	563	
35	Lindy Hansen	Norway	196	183	181	560	
36	Chow Un-Ju	North Korea	193	183	183	559	

OR Olympic record – Q Qualified for final

== Final ==
Rank	Athlete	Qual	Final	Total	Shoot-off	Notes
1st place, gold medalist(s)	Launi Meili (USA)	587	97.3	684.3		OR
2nd place, silver medalist(s)	Nonka Matova (BUL)	584	98.7	682.7		
3rd place, bronze medalist(s)	Małgorzata Książkiewicz (POL)	585	96.5	681.5		
4	Eva Forian (HUN)	582	97.5	679.5		
5	Suzana Skoko (CRO)	580	98.7	678.7		
6	Vessela Letcheva (BUL)	581	97.0	678.0		
7	Sharon Bowes (CAN)	580	93.6	673.6	?	
8	Éva Joó (HUN)	580	93.6	673.6	?	

OR Olympic record

== Sources ==
- Games of the XXV Olympiad Barcelona 1992: The results (PDF).
