= Mirjana Jovović-Horvat =

Bosnia and Herzegovina sports shooter

Personal information
- National team: Yugoslavia; Bosnia and Herzegovina
- Born: October 2, 1949
- Died: September 5, 2021 (aged 71)

Sport
- Sport: Shooting

Mirjana Jovovic-Horvat (October 2, 1949 – November 5, 2021) was a sport shooter from Bosnia and Herzegovina. She represented Yugoslavia at the 1984 Summer Olympics and Bosnia and Herzegovina at the 1992 Summer Olympics.

Throughout her career, she was a member of JSD Partizan, and is the most decorated female athlete in the club's history. She won 67 medals at international competitions in both individual and team categories, and won over 400 medals in her home country. She joined the Yugoslav national team in 1969, winning silver and bronze medals in that year's European championships. She, alongside Desanka Pešut and Magdalena Herold, was a member of the team that won the 1970 world championships in both air rifle and rifle prone. She set a world record in small-caliber three-barreled rifle shooting in 1971 and became European champion in the category of small-caliber rifle shooting in the prone position twice, first in 1974 and later in 1983. She participated in both the 1984 Summer Olympics and the 1992 Summer Olympics. She began coaching other shooters in the 1980s, ultimately choosing to retire from shooting when one of her students surpassed her in the national championships.

Following her participation in the 1992 Summer Olympics, she, alongside weightlifter Mehmed Skender, returned to war-torn Bosnia on a convoy provided by Médecins Sans Frontières. She died in November 2021.

== Olympic results ==
Event	1984	1992
10 metre air rifle (women)	29th	8th
50 metre rifle three positions (women)	8th	T-17th
