= Dagmar Bílková =

Czech-Slovak sport shooter

Dagmar Bílková (born 15 January 1967 in Zvolen) is a Czech-Slovak former sport shooter who has competed for Czechoslovakia and the Czech Republic. She participated in rifle shooting events at the Summer Olympics in 1988, 1992, and 1996.

== Olympic results ==
Event	1988	1992	1996
50 metre rifle three positions (women)	T-16th	T-24th	T-22nd
10 metre air rifle (women)	T-30th	4th	T-20th
