= Silvia Sperber =

German sport shooter (born 1965)

Personal information
- Born: 9 February 1965 (age 61) Erpfting, West Germany
- Height: 1.57 m (5 ft 2 in)
- Weight: 45 kg (99 lb)

Sport
- Sport: Shooting
- Club: Königsschützen Penzing, Penzing; SSG Dynamit Fürth, Fürth
Medal record
Olympic Games
Representing West Germany
Gold medal – first place	1988 Seoul	50 m rifle 3 positions
Silver medal – second place	1988 Seoul	10 m air rifle

Silvia Sperber (born 9 February 1965) is a female German sports shooter. She competed at the 1984, 1988 and 1992 Olympics in five events in total, and won a gold and a silver medal in 1988.

== Olympic results ==
Event	1984	1988	1992
10 metre air rifle	11th 381	(silver) Silver; 393+104.5	9th 392
50 metre rifle three positions	–	(gold) Gold; 590+95.6	20th 574
