= Karin Biva =

Belgian sport shooter

Personal information
- Nationality: Belgian
- Born: 20 April 1962 (age 62); Dendermonde, Belgium

Sport
- Sport: Sports shooting

Karin Biva (born on 20 April 1962 in Dendermonde) is a Belgian sport shooter. She competed in rifle shooting events at the 1988 Summer Olympics and the 1992 Summer Olympics.

== Olympic results ==
Event	1988	1992
10 metre air rifle (women)	T-28th	T-31st
