= Alison Feast =

Australian sport shooter

Alison Hittmann
Personal information
- Full name: Alison Hittmann
- Nationality: Australian
- Born: Alison Feast; 20 July 1966 (age 59) Australia

Sport
- Sport: Sports shooting

Alison Mary Hittmann (née Feast, born 27 August 1966), also known as Alison Feast-Hittmann, is an Australian sport shooter. She competed in rifle shooting events at the 1988 Summer Olympics.

== Olympic results ==
| Event | 1988 |
|---|---|
| 10 metre air rifle (women) | T-22nd |
| 50 metre rifle three positions (women) | T-28th |
