= Lenka Koloušková =

Czech sport shooter

Personal information
- Nationality: Czech
- Born: 26 June 1968 (age 56); Šumperk, Czech Republic

Sport
- Sport: Sports shooting

Lenka Koloušková (born on 3 March 1967 in Šumperk) is a Czech sport shooter. She competed in rifle shooting events at the 1988 Summer Olympics and the 1992 Summer Olympics.

== Olympic results ==
| Event | 1988 | 1992 |
|---|---|---|
| 10 metre air rifle (women) | T-22nd | T-17th |
| 50 metre rifle three positions (women) | T-16th | 9th |
