= Barbara Troger =

Austrian sport shooter

Personal information
- Full name: Barbara Troger-Oberauer
- Nationality: Austrian
- Born: 5 November 1966 (age 59) Sankt Jakob, Austria

Sport
- Sport: Sports shooting

Barbara Troger (born 5 November 1966 in Sankt Jakob) is an Austrian sport shooter. She competed in rifle shooting events at the 1988 Summer Olympics.

== Olympic results ==
Event	1988
10 metre air rifle (women)	T-33rd
