= Dominique Aupretre =

French sport shooter

Dominique Auprètre
Personal information
- Nationality: French
- Born: 1 January 1958 (age 67); Cognac, France

Sport
- Sport: Sports shooting

Dominique Auprètre (born 1 January 1958 in Cognac) is a French sport shooter. She competed in rifle shooting events at the 1988 Summer Olympics.

== Olympic results ==
Event	1988
10 metre air rifle (women)	T-20th
