= Carina Jansson (athlete) =

Swedish sport shooter

Personal information
- Full name: Carina Eva Maria Jansson
- Nationality: Swedish
- Born: 11 May 1966 (age 58); Hökhuvud, Sweden

Sport
- Sport: Sports shooting

Carina Jansson (born 11 May 1966) is a Swedish sport shooter. She competed in rifle shooting events at the 1988 Summer Olympics.

== Olympic results ==
Event	1988
10 metre air rifle (women)	T-22nd
50 metre rifle three positions (women)	33rd
