= Książkiewicz =

Książkiewicz is a Polish surname. Archaic feminine forms are Książkiewiczowa (by husband), Książkiewiczówna (by father); they still can be used colloquially. Notable people with the surname include:

- Adolf Książkiewicz (1931–1994), Polish electrician and politician, member of the Sejm
- Barbara Książkiewicz (1913–2001), Polish athlete
- Feliks Książkiewicz (1889–1915), platoon leader of the Polish Legions, independence activist, Knight of the Order of Virtuti Militari
- Lidia Książkiewicz (born 1977), Polish pianist and organist
- Małgorzata Książkiewicz (born 1967), Polish sport shooter, Olympic medalist
- Marian Książkiewicz (1906–1981), Polish geologist
- Mariusz Książkiewicz (born 1989), German-born Polish-Canadian professional mixed martial artist
- Weronika Książkiewicz (born 1981), Polish actress
