= Irene Dufaux =

Swiss sport shooter

Personal information
- Nationality: Swiss
- Born: 7 November 1960 (age 64); Switzerland

Sport
- Sport: Sports shooting

Irene Dufaux (born on 7 November 1960) is a Swiss sport shooter. She competed in rifle shooting events at the 1988 Summer Olympics.

== Olympic results ==
Event	1988
50 metre rifle three positions (women)	9th
10 metre air rifle (women)	T-15th
