= Valérie Malet =

French sports shooter

Personal information
- Nationality: French
- Born: 7 October 1967 (age 57); Reims, France

Sport
- Sport: Sports shooting

Valérie Malet (born 7 October 1967 in Reims) is a French sport shooter. She competed in rifle shooting events at the 1988 Summer Olympics.

== Olympic results ==
Event	1988
10 metre air rifle (women)	T-20th
