= Liou Yuh-ju =

Taiwanese sport shooter

Liou Yuh-Ju
Personal information
- Nationality: Taiwanese
- Born: 25 June 1963 (age 61); Chinese Taipei

Sport
- Sport: Sports shooting

Liou Yuh-Ju (born 25 June 1963) is a Taiwanese sport shooter. She competed in rifle shooting events at the 1988 Summer Olympics.

== Olympic results ==
Event	1988
10 metre air rifle (women)	T-39th
