= Flavia Zanfra =

Italian sport shooter

Personal information
- Nationality: Italian
- Born: 7 May 1958 (age 66); Trieste, Italy

Sport
- Sport: Sports shooting

Flavia Zanfra (born 7 May 1958 in Trieste) is an Italian sport shooter. She competed in rifle shooting events at the 1988 Summer Olympics.

== Olympic results ==
Event	1988
10 metre air rifle (women)	T-41st
