= Sylvia Baldessarini =

Austrian sports shooter

Personal information
- Nationality: Austrian
- Born: 13 June 1971 (age 53); Zams, Austria

Sport
- Sport: Sports shooting

Sylvia Baldessarini (born 13 June 1971 in Zams) is an Austrian sport shooter. She competed in rifle shooting events at the 1988 Summer Olympics.

== Olympic results ==
Event	1988
50 metre rifle three positions (women)	T-16th
10 metre air rifle (women)	9th
