= Anne Grethe Stormorken =

Dutch sports shooter

Personal information
- Nationality: Dutch
- Born: 2 September 1969 (age 55); Deventer, Netherlands

Sport
- Sport: Sports shooting

Anne Grethe Stormorken (born 2 September 1969 in Deventer) is a Dutch sport shooter. She competed in rifle shooting events at the 1988 Summer Olympics.

== Olympic results ==
| Event | 1988 |
|---|---|
| 10 metre air rifle (women) | T-22nd |
