= Zeynep Oka =

Turkish sport shooter

Personal information
- Nationality: Turkish
- Born: 15 July 1966 (age 59); Turkey

Sport
- Sport: Sports shooting

Zeynep Oka (born 15 July 1966) is a Turkish sport shooter. She competed in rifle shooting events at the 1988 Summer Olympics.

== Olympic results ==
Event	1988
10 metre air rifle (women)	T-28th
