= Shooting at the 1988 Summer Olympics – Women's 50 metre rifle three positions =

Sports shooting at the Olympics

Women's 50 metre rifle three positions at the Games of the XXIV Olympiad
- Date: 21 September 1988
- Competitors: 37 from 22 nations
- Winning score: 685.6 (OR)

Medalists
1st place, gold medalist(s)		Silvia Sperber	West Germany
2nd place, silver medalist(s)		Vesela Letcheva	Bulgaria
3rd place, bronze medalist(s)		Valentina Cherkasova	Soviet Union

Women's 50 metre rifle three positions (then known as standard rifle) was one of the thirteen shooting events at the 1988 Summer Olympics.

== Qualification round ==
Rank	Athlete	Country	Prone	Stand	Kneel	Total	Notes
1	Silvia Sperber	West Germany	200	193	197	590	Q OR
2	Valentina Cherkasova	Soviet Union	198	193	195	586	Q
3	Anna Maloukhina	Soviet Union	198	191	196	585	Q
4	Katja Klepp	East Germany	199	187	198	584	Q
5	Sharon Bowes	Canada	196	194	194	584	Q
6	Vesela Letcheva	Bulgaria	199	192	192	583	Q
7	Anita Karlsson	Sweden	198	193	192	583	Q
8	Launi Meili	United States	197	190	195	582	Q
9	Irene Dufaux	Switzerland	198	192	191	581	
10	Pirjo Peltola	Finland	196	188	196	580	
11	Nonka Matova	Bulgaria	199	187	194	580	
11	Selma Sonnet	West Germany	197	190	193	580	
13	Wanda Jewell	United States	197	186	196	579	
13	May-Irene Olsen	Norway	196	190	193	579	
13	Zhang Qiuping	China	199	184	196	579	
16	Sylvia Baldessarini	Austria	197	190	191	578	
16	Dagmar Bilková	Czechoslovakia	193	189	196	578	
16	Lenka Koloušková	Czechoslovakia	199	186	193	578	
19	Christina Schulze-Ashcroft	Canada	199	182	196	577	
20	Dorothee Deuring	Austria	198	184	194	576	
20	Éva Joó	Hungary	198	189	189	576	
20	Zhou Danhong	China	198	184	194	576	
23	Soma Dutta	India	198	183	194	575	
23	Dominique Esnault	France	200	185	190	575	
23	Lee Hye-kyung	South Korea	199	187	189	575	
26	Eva Forian	Hungary	198	186	189	573	
27	Sirpa Ylönen	Finland	197	186	189	572	
28	Alison Feast	Australia	195	184	191	570	
28	Mladenka Malenica	Yugoslavia	193	184	193	570	
30	Isabelle Héberlé	France	195	183	190	568	
30	Kim Young-mi	South Korea	196	185	187	568	
32	Kyoko Kinoshita	Japan	193	184	189	566	
33	Carina Jansson	Sweden	199	172	193	565	
34	Gaby Bühlmann	Switzerland	195	180	186	561	
34	Thiranun Jinda	Thailand	194	176	191	561	
36	Sarah Cooper	Great Britain	198	168	191	557	
37	Siri Landsem	Norway	195	179	182	556	

OR Olympic record – Q Qualified for final

== Final ==
Rank	Athlete	Qual	Final	Total	Notes
1st place, gold medalist(s)	Silvia Sperber (FRG)	590	95.6	685.6	OR
2nd place, silver medalist(s)	Vesela Letcheva (BUL)	583	100.2	683.2	
3rd place, bronze medalist(s)	Valentina Cherkasova (URS)	586	95.4	681.4	
4	Katja Klepp (GDR)	584	96.5	680.5	
5	Sharon Bowes (CAN)	584	96.5	680.5	
6	Anna Maloukhina (URS)	585	93.4	678.4	
7	Launi Meili (USA)	582	94.5	676.5	
8	Anita Karlsson (SWE)	583	93.4	676.4	

OR Olympic record

== Sources ==
- XXIVth Olympiad Seoul 1988 Official Report – Volume 2 Part 2 (PDF).
