= Pirjo Peltola =

Finnish sport shooter (born 1961)

Pirjo Peltola (born July 26, 1961, in Karstula, Finland) is a Finnish sport shooter. She competed in rifle shooting events at the Summer Olympics in 1988 and 1992.

== Olympic results ==
Event	1988	1992
10 metre air rifle (women)	5th	42nd
50 metre rifle three positions (women)	10th	27th
