= Gianfranco Mantelli =

Italian sports shooter

Personal information
- Nationality: Italian
- Born: 17 May 1947 (age 77); Rome, Italy

Sport
- Sport: Sports shooting

Gianfranco Mantelli (born 17 May 1947) is an Italian sports shooter. He competed at the 1976 Summer Olympics and the 1980 Summer Olympics.
