= Nieves Fernández =

Spanish sport shooter

Personal information
- Full name: Nieves Fernández Mata
- Nationality: Spanish
- Born: 19 October 1968 (age 57) Leon, Spain

Sport
- Sport: Sports shooting

Nieves Fernández Mata (born 19 October 1968 in Leon) is a Spanish sport shooter. She competed in rifle shooting events at the 1992 Summer Olympics.

== Olympic results ==
Event	1992
10 metre air rifle (women)	T-26th
50 metre rifle three positions (women)	T-24th
