= Suzana Skoko =

Croatian sport shooter (born 1971)

Medal record

Women's shooting

Representing Croatia

Mediterranean Games
Gold medal – first place	1997 Bari	50 m rifle 3 positions

Suzana Skoko (born 21 June 1971 in Zagreb) is a Croatian sport shooter. She competed for Croatia in the 1992 Summer Olympics in Barcelona and 1996 Summer Olympics in Atlanta. Her best Olympic result was 5th place in the 50 metre rifle three positions in 1992.

== Achievements ==
Year	Competition	Venue	Position	Notes
Representing Croatia
1992	Olympic Games	Barcelona, Spain	23rd	10 metre air rifle
1992	Olympic Games	Barcelona, Spain	5th	50 metre rifle three positions
1996	Olympic Games	Atlanta, United States	25th	10 metre air rifle
1996	Olympic Games	Atlanta, United States	12th	50 metre rifle three positions
