= Siri Landsem =

Norwegian sport shooter (born 1965)

Siri Landsem Lorentsen (born 14 June 1965) is a Norwegian sport shooter.

She was born in Trondheim. At the 1984 Summer Olympics she finished seventh in the 10 metre air rifle event and 17th in the 50 metre rifle three positions event. At the 1988 Summer Olympics she finished 36th in the 10 metre air rifle event and 37th in the 50 metre rifle three positions event.

She has her education from the Norwegian School of Sport Sciences. She resides in Hommelvik.
