= May Irene Olsen =

Norwegian sport shooter (born 1956)

Personal information
- Nationality: Norwegian
- Born: 22 May 1956 (age 69); Lørenskog, Norway

Sport
- Sport: Shooting

May Irene Olsen (born 22 May 1956) is a Norwegian sport shooter, born in Lørenskog.

== Biography ==
Olsen competed in women's 10 metre air rifle and 50 metre rifle three positions at the 1988 Summer Olympics in Seoul.

She won the King’s Cup trophy in 1989.
