= Katja Klepp =

German sports shooter

Katja Klepp (born 25 October 1967 in Erfurt) is a German sport shooter. She competed at the 1988 Summer Olympics in the women's 50 metre rifle three positions event, in which she placed fourth, and the women's 10 metre air rifle event, in which she placed 37th.
