= Biserka Vrbek =

Croatian sports shooter

Personal information
- Nationality: Croatian
- Born: 17 June 1959 (age 66); Zagreb, Yugoslavia

Sport
- Sport: Sports shooting

Biserka Vrbek (born 17 June 1959) is a Croatian sports shooter. She competed in the women's 50 metre rifle three positions event at the 1984 Summer Olympics.
