= Alfons Messerschmitt =

German sports shooter (1943–2022)

Alfons Messerschmitt (10 June 1943 – 14 December 2022) was a German sport shooter who competed in the 1988 Summer Olympics.
