= Éva Fórián =

Hungarian sport shooter

Éva Fórián (born 3 April 1960 in Debrecen) is a Hungarian sport shooter. She competed in rifle shooting events at the Summer Olympics in 1980, 1988, 1992, and 1996.

== Olympic results ==
Event	1980	1988	1992	1996
50 metre rifle three positions (mixed)	T-11th	—	—	—
50 metre rifle three positions (women)	—	26th	4th	T-30th
10 metre air rifle (women)	—	T-12th	7th	T-31st
