= Aikaterini Kotroni =

Greek sports shooter

Personal information
- Nationality: Greek
- Born: 12 July 1963 (age 61); Agios Nikolaos, Greece

Sport
- Sport: Sports shooting

Aikaterini Kotroni (born 12 July 1963) is a Greek sports shooter. She competed in the women's 10 metre air rifle event at the 1992 Summer Olympics.
