= Karin Bauer =

Austrian sports shooter (born 1963)

Personal information
- Nationality: Austrian
- Born: 16 December 1963 (age 62)

Sport
- Sport: Sports shooting

Karin Bauer (born 16 December 1963) is an Austrian sports shooter. She competed in two events at the 1984 Summer Olympics.
