= Launi Meili =

American sport shooter (born 1963)

Personal information
- Full name: Launi Kay Meili
- Born: June 4, 1963 (age 63) Spokane, Washington, U.S.
Medal record
Women's shooting
Representing the United States
Olympic Games
| Gold medal – first place | 1992 Barcelona | 50 m rifle 3 positions |

Launi Kay Meili (born June 4, 1963, in Spokane, Washington) is an American sport shooter and Olympic champion from Cheney, Washington. She won a gold medal at the 1992 Summer Olympics in Barcelona.

Following her Olympic career, she coached the all-woman University of Nebraska rifle team to the co-ed NCAA National Championship. In 2008, she was appointed rifle coach at the United States Air Force Academy.

Meili has been inducted into the USA Shooting Hall of fame.

Olympic results
| Event | 1988 | 1992 |
|---|---|---|
| 50 metre rifle three positions | 7th 582+94.5 | (gold) Gold; 587+97.3 |
| 10 metre air rifle | 6th 395+98.3 | 11th 391 |
