= Isabelle Héberlé =

French sport shooter

Personal information
- Nationality: French
- Born: 11 May 1959 (age 65); Belfort, France

Sport
- Sport: Sports shooting

Isabelle Héberlé (born 11 May 1959) is a French sport shooter. She competed in rifle shooting events at the 1988 Summer Olympics and the 1992 Summer Olympics.

== Olympic results ==
Event	1988	1992
50 metre rifle three positions (women)	T-30th	32nd
