= Anita Shrestha =

Nepalese sports shooter

Personal information
- Nationality: Nepalese

Sport
- Sport: Sports shooting

Anita Shrestha is a Nepalese sports shooter. She competed in the women's 10 metre air rifle event at the 1992 Summer Olympics.
