= Mehmed Skender =

Bosnian coach and weightlifter (born 1959)

Personal information
- Nationality: Bosnian
- Born: 30 May 1959 (age 66); Zenica, Yugoslavia

Sport
- Sport: Weightlifting

Mehmed Skender (born 30 May 1959) is a Bosnian coach and former weightlifter. He competed in the men's heavyweight II event at the 1992 Summer Olympics.

== Biography ==
Skender was born on 30 May 1959, in Zenica, Yugoslavia. Growing up, he competed in the sport of athletics and in weightlifting, competing for the Yugoslavian national teams in both sports. In weightlifting, he broke national records more than 30 times. As the Bosnian War started, Skender joined the Army of the Republic of Bosnia and Herzegovina. He was serving in the war when the first Olympic team for Bosnia and Herzegovina was being formed in 1992. He was one of several athletes on the team that were selected while actively participating in the war; when he was contacted to join, he was stationed in a trench while manning a machine gun, defending his village of Zenica, where his wife and two children lived.

Due to the scarcity of food as a result of the war, Skender trained while surviving on only one meal a day: rice and macaroni. He ended up being one of 10 athletes who competed for Bosnia and Herzegovina at the 1992 Summer Olympics, the inaugural participation at the games for the nation. He later recalled to Al Jazeera Balkans his experience at the opening ceremony:

I didn't experience Barcelona in the true sporting sense. We watched others rejoice, but the 10 of us were a special part of the world of the Olympic Games. We were ambassadors for our country just two months after the start of the aggression, and that filled us with pride and dignity ... So many concentrated feelings, millions of emotions as you walk under the flag of a beloved country that is bleeding at that moment and whose sons are dying ... Everyone was on their feet, Barcelona was burning with shouts of "Bosnia, Bosnia". I didn't feel like I was walking, I wasn't on the red tartan, I was lifted by some stormy ecstasy, some kind of ecstasy of happiness and pain at the same time. Our hands were raised high to the sky, we walked so proud and sad.

In his event, the men's heavyweight II competition, Skender placed 20th, having recorded a snatch of 140 kilograms (310 lb) and a mark of 180 kilograms (400 lb) in the clean and jerk. After his participation at the Olympics, he returned to war-torn Bosnia along with sport shooter Mirjana Jovović-Horvat on a convoy provided by Médecins Sans Frontières. After returning, he "slept, put on the uniform of the RBiH Army and went to war." During this time, he also trained youth in Zenica and continued training in weightlifting. He was selected for the 1993 Mediterranean Games, where he placed fifth in his event.

Skender retired from weightlifting in 1995, and after the war, became a coach at the Zenica Athletic Club. He is regarded as one of the top Bosnian athletics coaches, having trained several notable athletes including Mesud Pezer, Hamza Alić, Paša Šehić and Sanela Redžić. He has also coached Bosnian athletes at various Summer Olympics including 2008, 2012, 2016, and 2024.
