= Carmen Giese =

West German sport shooter

Personal information
- Full name: Carmen Giese
- Nationality: West German
- Born: 14 March 1965 (age 60); Rotenburg an der Fulda, West Germany

Sport
- Sport: Sports shooting

Carmen Giese (born 14 March 1965 in Rotenburg an der Fulda) is a West German sport shooter. She competed in rifle shooting events at the 1988 Summer Olympics.

== Olympic results ==
Event	1988
10 metre air rifle (women)	T-17th
