= Annette Sattel =

French sports shooter

Personal information
- Nationality: French
- Born: 19 May 1971 (age 53); Saverne, France

Sport
- Sport: Sports shooting

Annette Sattel (born 19 May 1971) is a French former sports shooter. She competed in the women's 10 metre air rifle event at the 1992 Summer Olympics.
