= Christine Bontemps =

French sports shooter

Personal information
- Nationality: French
- Born: 16 July 1969 (age 55); Remiremont, France

Sport
- Sport: Sports shooting

Christine Bontemps (born 16 July 1969) is a French sports shooter. She competed in the women's 10 metre air rifle event at the 1992 Summer Olympics.
