= Shahana Parveen =

Bangladeshi sports shooter

Kazi Shahana Parveen (born 1 July 1960) is a Bangladeshi shooter who participated in the 1992 Summer Olympics in the Women's 10 metre air rifle event, 1994 Asian Games and 1998 Commonwealth Games. She was the first woman to represent Bangladesh at the Olympics.

== Career ==
At the 1992 Summer Olympics held in Barcelona, Parveen represented Bangladesh in the Women's 10 metre air rifle event but failed to qualify for the final round. In the qualifying round she obtained 379 points and finished at 43rd place. Two years later, Parveen competed at the Hiroshima Asian Games. She participated in the 10 metre air rifle, 50 metre rifle 3 positions and 50 metre rifle prone events and secured 27th, 14th and 26th positions respectively but could not qualify for the finals of any of these. In 1998, she paired with Sabrina Sultana for the women's free rifle prone pairs at the 1998 Commonwealth Games and finished in the eighth position.

Parveen was the manager for Bangladeshi women's team at the 2008 Indo-Bangla Games. She is among the 10 recipients of the 1999 Bangladeshi National Sports Awards. In 2016, she was honoured by the Bangladesh Sports Press Association.
