= Cristina Fernández (sport shooter) =

Spanish sports shooter

Personal information
- Nationality: Spanish
- Born: 24 July 1974 (age 50)

Sport
- Sport: Sports shooting

Cristina Fernández (born 24 July 1974) is a Spanish sports shooter. She competed in the women's 10 metre air rifle event at the 1992 Summer Olympics.
