= Yeo Kab-soon =

South Korean sport shooter (born 1974)

Personal information
- Born: May 8, 1974 (age 52) Seoul, South Korea

Korean name
- Hangul: 여갑순
- RR: Yeo Gapsun
- MR: Yŏ Kapsun
Medal record
Women's shooting
Representing South Korea
Olympic Games
Gold medal – first place	1992 Barcelona	10 m air rifle

Yeo Kab-soon (Korean: 여갑순; born May 8, 1974) is a South Korean sport shooter who competed in the 1992 Summer Olympics. She was born in Seoul.
