= Anita Karlsson =

Swedish sports shooter

Anita Karlsson (born November 1, 1965, in Ätran) is a Swedish sport shooter. She competed at the 1988 Summer Olympics in the women's 50 metre rifle three positions event, in which she placed eighth, and the women's 10 metre air rifle event, in which she tied for 33rd place.

At the European Championships in 10 m air rifle in 1986, held in Espoo, Finland, she, together with Ann-Cristin Vuolo Junros and Anette Olsson, placed second and won the silver medal for Sweden.
