= European Master =

European Master is a postgraduate degree in Europe which is usually conducted by several universities from different countries (joint degree). One of the famous European master programmes are offered by Erasmus Mundus Programme from European Commission. There are many other programmes offered outside the Erasmus Mundus Programme.

These programmes use the European Credit Transfer System (ECTS).
