= Shooting at the 1984 Summer Olympics =

Shooting at the Games of the XXIII Olympiad

Shooting at the 1984 Summer Olympics took place at Prado Olympic Shooting Park, Chino, California, United States. The games marked the first time that women’s shooting events were included in the Olympic program.

== Medal count ==
Rank	Nation	Gold	Silver	Bronze	Total
1	United States	3	1	2	6
2	China	3	0	3	6
3	Italy	1	1	1	3
4	France	1	1	0	2
5	Great Britain	1	0	3	4
6	Canada	1	0	0	1
6	Japan	1	0	0	1
8	Austria	0	1	0	1
8	Colombia	0	1	0	1
8	Denmark	0	1	0	1
8	Peru	0	1	0	1
8	Romania	0	1	0	1
8	Sweden	0	1	0	1
8	Switzerland	0	1	0	1
8	West Germany	0	1	0	1
16	Australia	0	0	1	1
16	Finland	0	0	1	1
Totals (17 entries)		11	11	11	33

== Medalists ==
=== Men's events ===
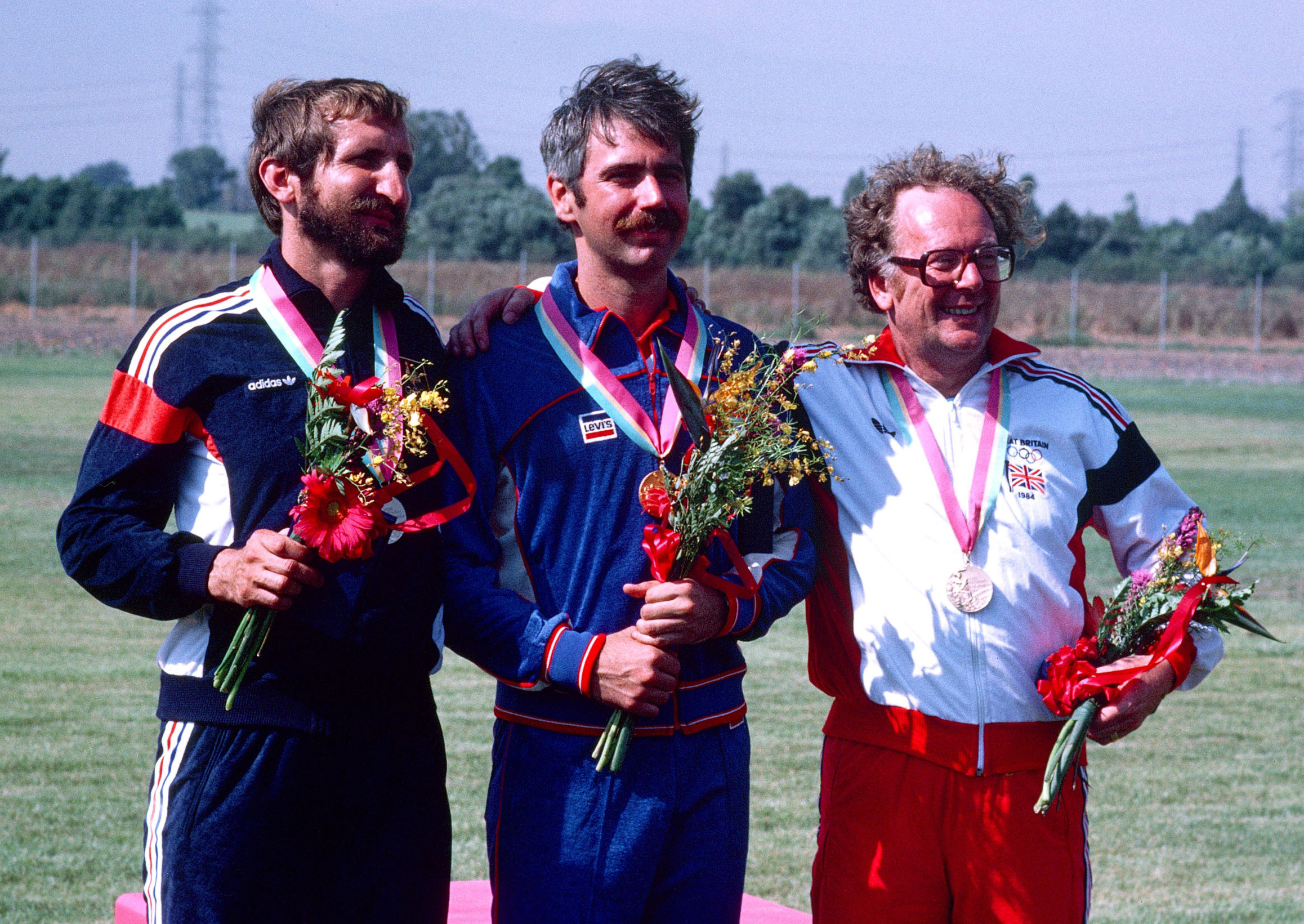
From left to right: Michel Bury, Edward Etzel and Michael Sullivan

Event	Gold	Silver	Bronze
10 m air rifle	Philippe Heberlé; France	Andreas Kronthaler; Austria	Barry Dagger; Great Britain
25 m rapid fire pistol	Takeo Kamachi; Japan	Corneliu Ion; Romania	Rauno Bies; Finland
50 m fire pistol	Xu Haifeng; China	Ragnar Skanåker; Sweden	Wang Yifu; China
50 m rifle prone	Edward Etzel; United States	Michel Bury; France	Michael Sullivan; Great Britain
50 m rifle three positions	Malcolm Cooper; Great Britain	Daniel Nipkov; Switzerland	Alister Allan; Great Britain
50 m running target	Li Yuwei; China	Helmut Bellingrodt; Colombia	Huang Shiping; China

=== Women's events ===
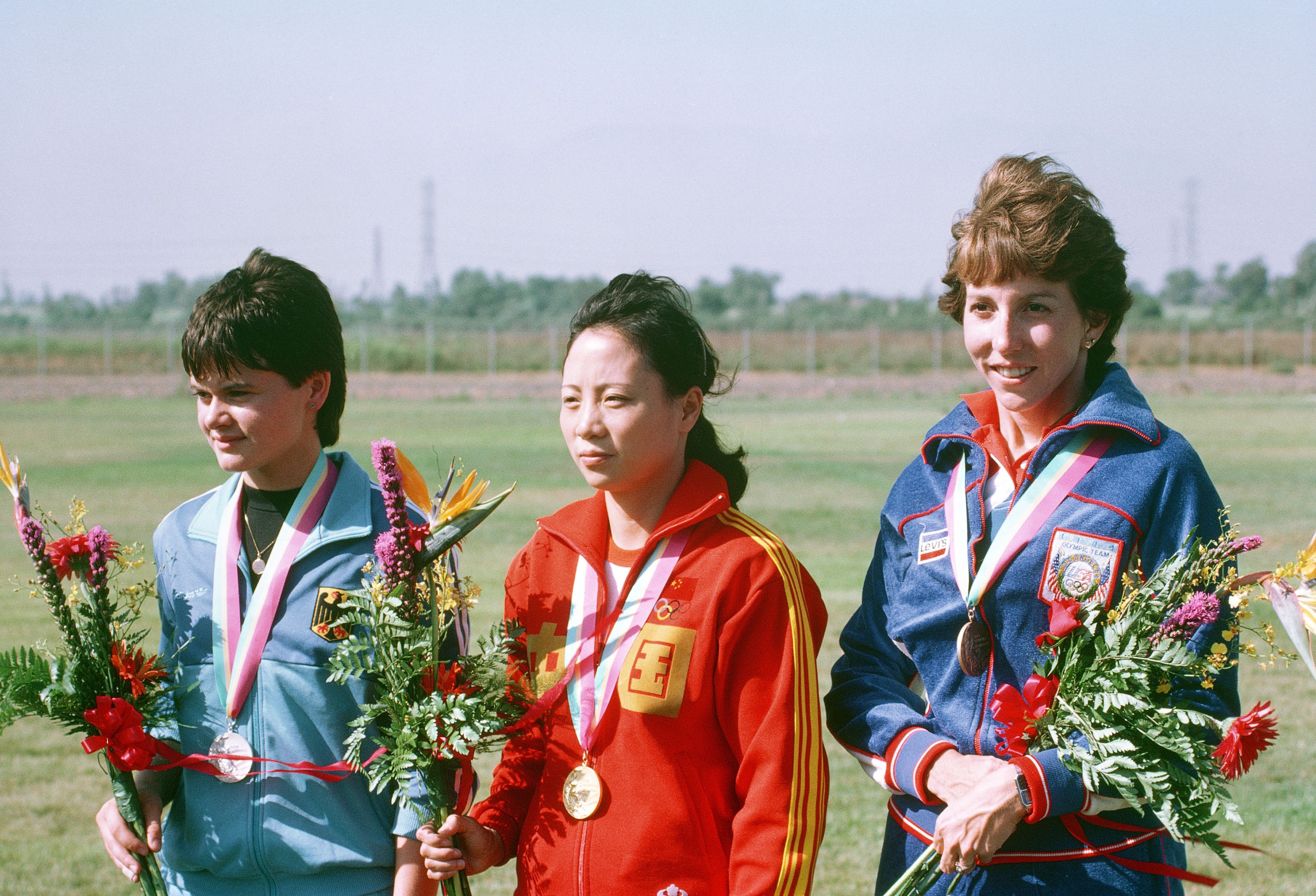
From left to right: Ulrike Holmer, Wu Xiauxuan and Wanda R. Jewell

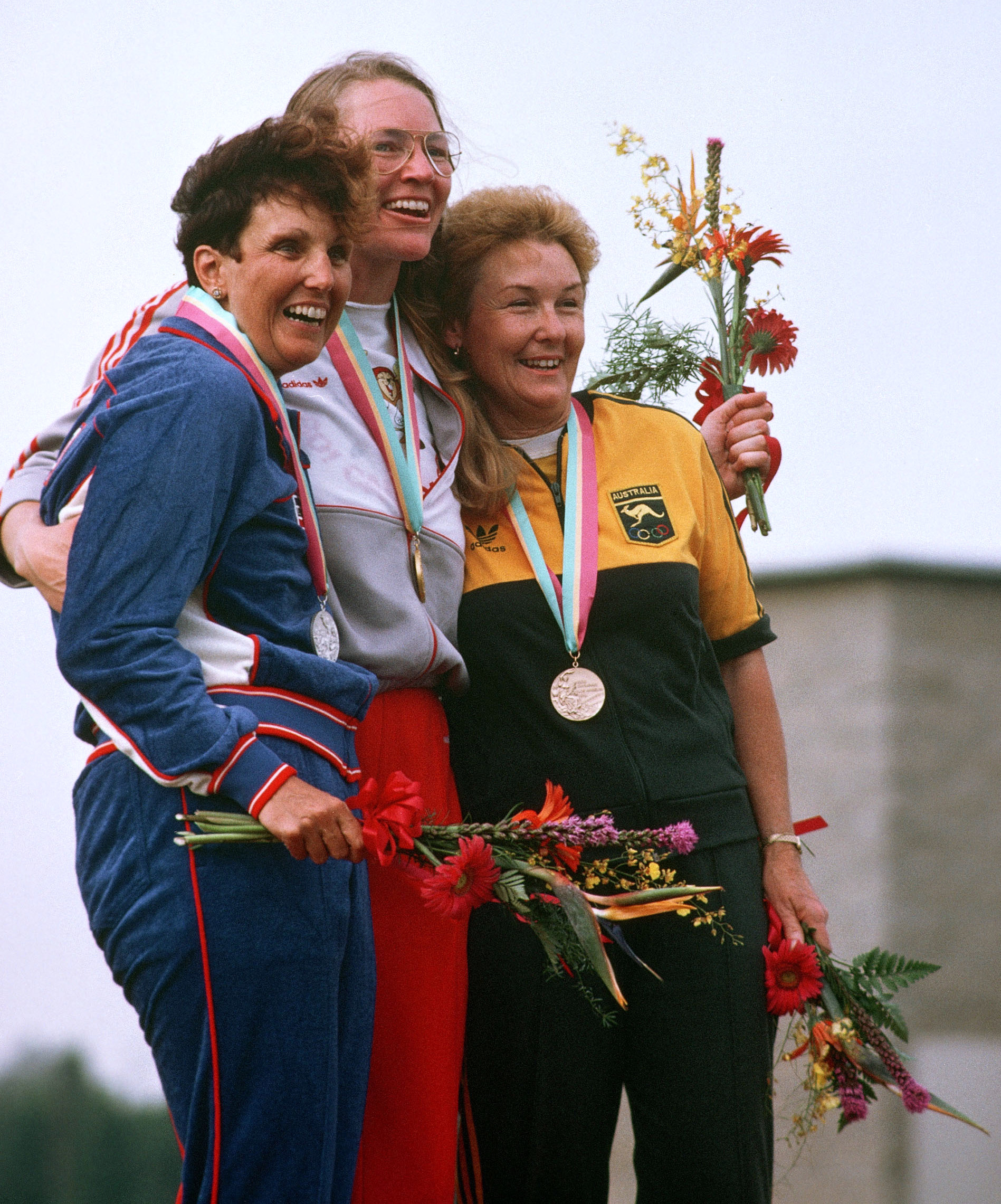
From left to right: Ruby Fox, Linda Thom and Patricia Dench

Event	Gold	Silver	Bronze
10 m air rifle	Pat Spurgin; United States	Edith Gufler; Italy	Wu Xiaoxuan; China
25 m pistol	Linda Thom; Canada	Ruby Fox; United States	Patricia Dench; Australia
50 m rifle three positions	Wu Xiaoxuan; China	Ulrike Holmer; West Germany	Wanda Jewell; United States

=== Mixed events ===
Event	Gold	Silver	Bronze
Skeet	Matthew Dryke; United States	Ole Riber Rasmussen; Denmark	Luca Scribani Rossi; Italy
Trap	Luciano Giovannetti; Italy	Francisco Boza; Peru	Daniel Carlisle; United States

== Participating nations ==
A total of 460 shooters, 382 men and 77 women, from 68 nations competed at the Los Angeles Games:

- Andorra (2)
- Argentina (6)
- Australia (9)
- Austria (10)
- Bahrain (4)
- Belgium (6)
- Bolivia (4)
- Brazil (8)
- Canada (17)
- Chile (4)
- China (17)
- Chinese Taipei (3)
- Colombia (14)
- Costa Rica (3)
- Cyprus (4)
- Denmark (3)
- Ecuador (4)
- Egypt (9)
- El Salvador (1)
- Finland (10)
- France (15)
- Great Britain (18)
- Greece (5)
- Guatemala (4)
- Hong Kong (7)
- India (8)
- Indonesia (2)
- Ireland (2)
- Israel (3)
- Italy (12)
- Japan (15)
- Jordan (7)
- Kenya (2)
- Lebanon (4)
- Liechtenstein (2)
- Luxembourg (1)
- Malaysia (1)
- Malta (2)
- Mexico (8)
- Monaco (4)
- Netherlands (4)
- New Zealand (3)
- Norway (7)
- Oman (8)
- Papua New Guinea (2)
- Paraguay (6)
- Peru (7)
- Philippines (1)
- Portugal (5)
- Puerto Rico (2)
- Qatar (4)
- Romania (6)
- San Marino (10)
- Saudi Arabia (6)
- Senegal (2)
- South Korea (18)
- Spain (11)
- Sweden (14)
- Switzerland (9)
- Syria (1)
- Thailand (17)
- Turkey (2)
- United States (20)
- Virgin Islands (3)
- Venezuela (5)
- West Germany (18)
- Yugoslavia (6)
- Zimbabwe (3)

== See also ==
- Shooting at the Friendship Games
