= Kurt Hillenbrand =

German sports shooter

Personal information
- Nationality: German
- Born: 16 September 1957 (age 67); Kronau, Germany

Sport
- Sport: Sports shooting

Kurt Hillenbrand (born 16 September 1957) is a German sports shooter. He competed at the 1984 Summer Olympics and the 1988 Summer Olympics.
