= Matthias Stich =

German sports shooter

Personal information
- Nationality: German
- Born: 11 October 1963 (age 61); Oldenburg, Germany

Sport
- Sport: Sports shooting

Matthias Stich (born 11 October 1963) is a German sports shooter. He competed at the 1988 Summer Olympics and the 1992 Summer Olympics.
