= Irene Daw =

British sports shooter (1941–2010)

Personal information
- Nationality: British
- Born: 13 February 1941 England
- Died: 30 October 2010 (aged 69)

Sport
- Country: United Kingdom
- Sport: Shooting sport
- Events: 10 metre air rifle; 50 metre rifle three positions; 50 metre rifle prone
Medal record
Women's shooting
Representing United Kingdom
Event / 1st / 2nd / 3rd; World Shooting Championships / - / - / 1
World Shooting Championships
| Silver medal – second place | 1979 Seoul | Women Team 10 m Air Rifle |

Dr Irene Daw (13 February 1941 – 30 October 2010) was a British sports shooter and Olympian. Daw represented Great Britain at the 1984 Summer Olympics, the first Olympic Games to include 10 metre air rifle. At the 1979 ISSF World Shooting Championships, she won a Bronze medal as part of the Women's Air Rifle Team.
