= Sigrid Lang =

German sports shooter

Personal information
- Nationality: German
- Born: 4 November 1963 (age 61)

Sport
- Sport: Sports shooting

Sigrid Lang (born 4 November 1963) is a German sports shooter. She competed in the women's 50 metre rifle three positions event at the 1984 Summer Olympics.
