= Philippe Heberlé =

French sport shooter

Medal record

Men's sport shooting

Representing France

Olympic Games
Gold medal – first place	1984 Los Angeles	10 m air rifle

Philippe Heberlé (born 21 March 1963) is a French sport shooter and Olympic Champion. He won a gold medal in the 10 metre air rifle event at the 1984 Summer Olympics in Los Angeles and became World Champion twice in 1983 and 1985.
