= Jolande Swinkels =

Dutch sports shooter

Personal information
- Nationality: Dutch
- Born: 6 February 1966 (age 59); Boekel, Netherlands

Sport
- Sport: Sports shooting

Jolande Swinkels (born 6 February 1966) is a Dutch sports shooter. She competed in the women's 10 metre air rifle event at the 1992 Summer Olympics.
