= Ulrike Holmer =

German sport shooter

Medal record

Women's shooting

Representing Germany

Olympic Games
Silver medal – second place	1984 Los Angeles	50 metre rifle three positions

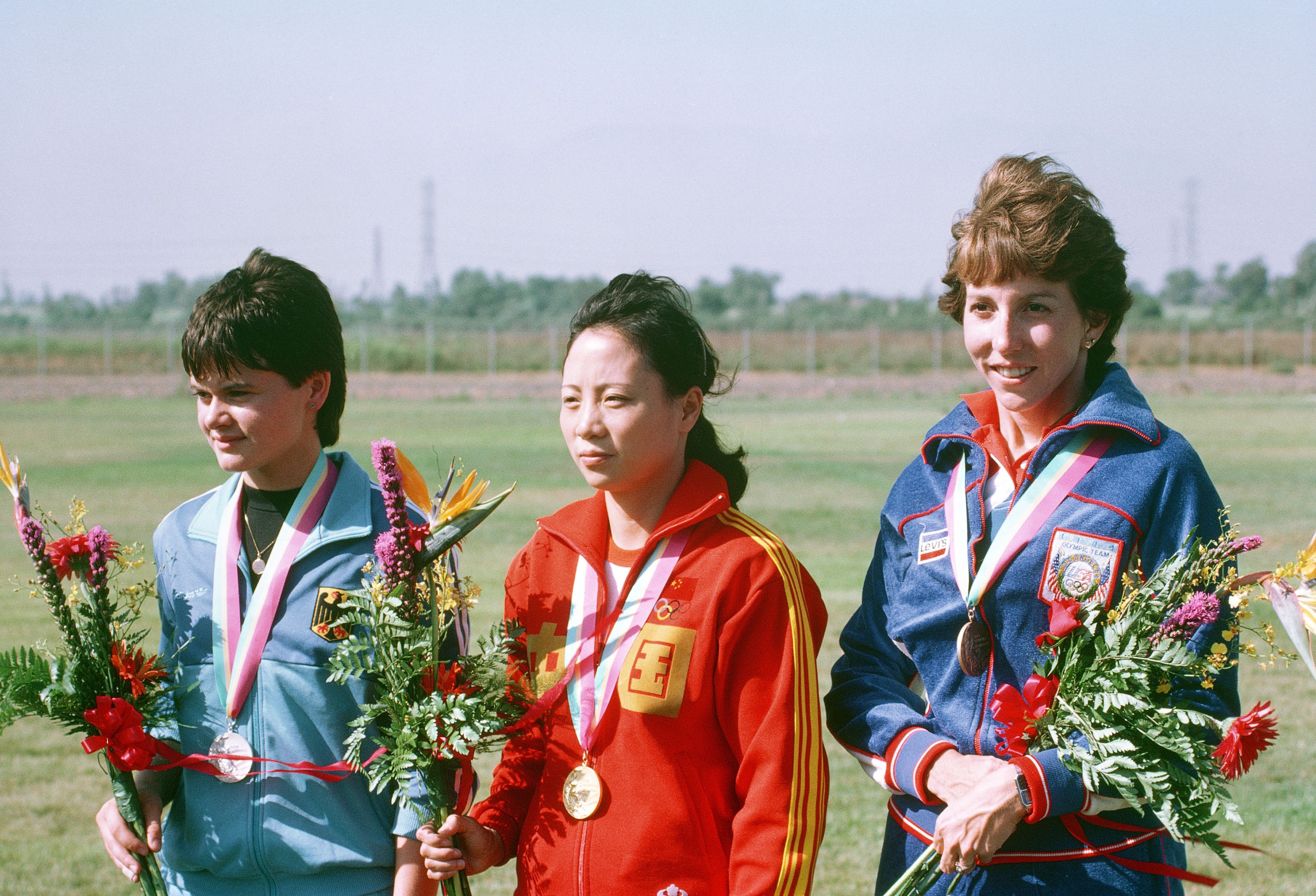
Ulrike Holmwe, Wu Xiaoxuan, Wanda R. Jewell, 1984 Summer Olympics

Ulrike Holmer (born 6 October 1967) is a German sport shooter. She won the silver medal in the 50 metre rifle three positions in the 1984 Summer Olympics in Los Angeles.
