= Šaćir Džeko =

Yugoslav sports shooter

Personal information
- Nationality: Yugoslav
- Born: 25 January 1956 (age 69)

Sport
- Sport: Sports shooting

Šaćir Džeko (born 25 January 1956) is a Yugoslav sports shooter. He competed in the men's 10 metre air rifle event at the 1984 Summer Olympics.
