= Per Erik Løkken =

Norwegian sports shooter (born 1956)

Personal information
- Nationality: Norwegian
- Born: 25 June 1956 (age 69); Østre Toten, Norway

Sport
- Sport: Sports shooting

Per Erik Løkken (born 25 June 1956) is a Norwegian sports shooter. He competed in the men's 10 metre air rifle event at the 1984 Summer Olympics.
