= Gloria Parmentier =

American sports shooter

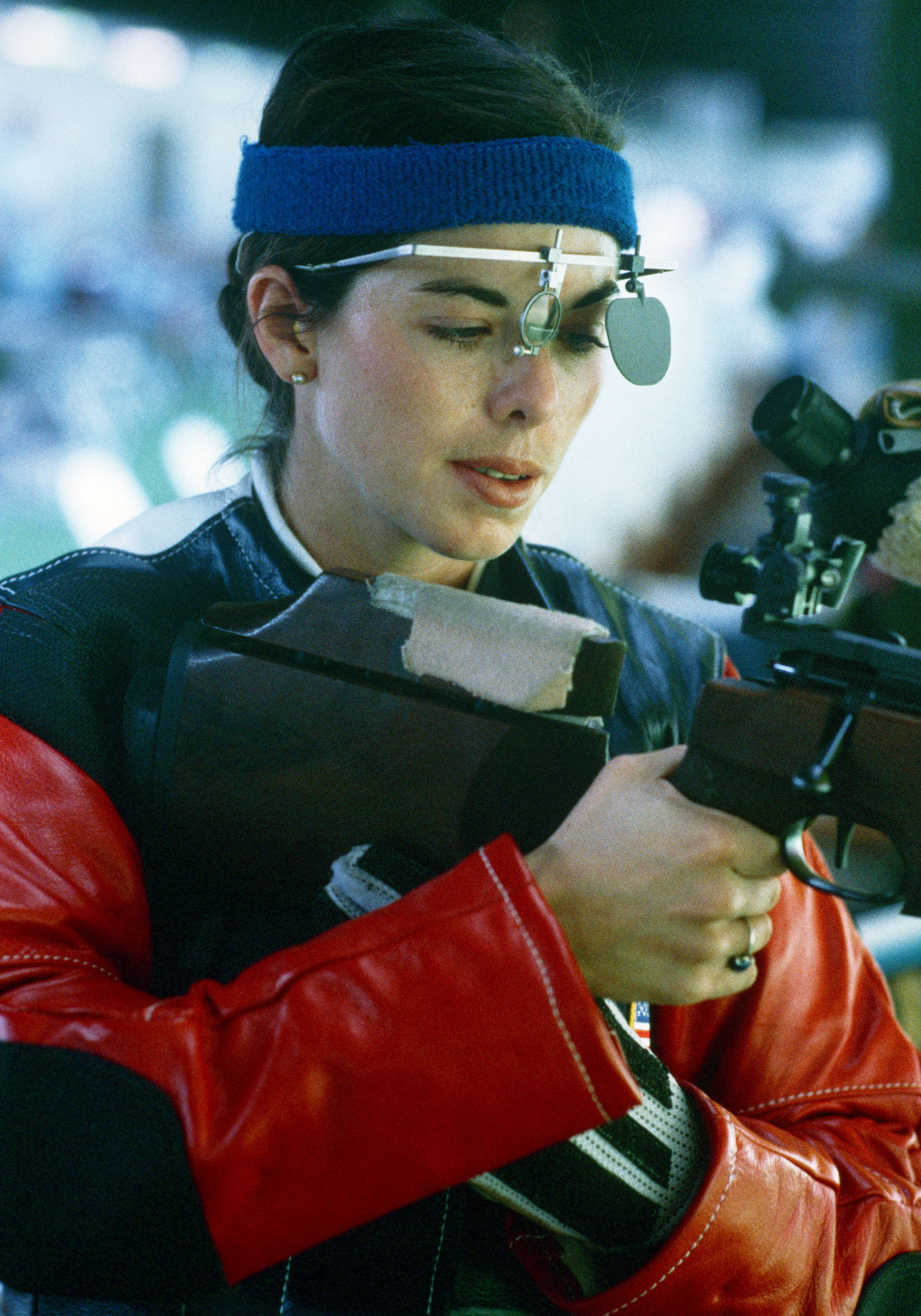
- Parmentier in 1984

Personal information
- Born: March 22, 1958 (age 67); Columbus, Georgia, United States

Sport
- Sport: Sports shooting

Gloria Parmentier (born March 22, 1958) is an American sports shooter. She competed in the women's 50 metre rifle three positions event at the 1984 Summer Olympics.
