= Irina Shilova =

Belarusian sport shooter

Iryna Shilova
Personal information
- Native name: Ірына Алегаўна Шылава (Шылава-)
- Full name: Iryna Alehauna Shylava (Shylava-)
- Born: 22 February 1966 (age 60) Hrodna, Belarus, USSR
- Height: 163 cm (5 ft 4 in)
- Weight: 54 kg (119 lb)
Medal record
Shooting
Representing Soviet Union
Olympic Games
Gold medal – first place	1988 Seoul	10 metre air rifle
- Updated on 28 August 2024

Irina Shilova (born 22 February 1967 in Hrodna) is a Belarusian sports shooter and Olympic champion. She won a gold medal for the Soviet Union in the 10 metre air rifle at the 1988 Summer Olympics in Seoul. She has later competed for Belarus, and placed 9th in the 1996 Summer Olympics.
