= Valentina Cherkasova =

Soviet sport shooter

Medal record

Women's shooting

Representing Soviet Union

Olympic Games
Bronze medal – third place	1988 Seoul	50 m rifle 3 pos

Valentina Vladimirovna Cherkasova (Russian: Валентина Владимировна Черкасова, before 1977 Makarova; born June 22, 1958) is a Soviet sport shooter. She won the Bronze medal in the 50 m rifle 3 pos in the 1988 Summer Olympics in Seoul.

She was born in Jõhvi. In 1981 she graduated from a sport school in Moscow.

She began her shooting career in 1971 in Narva, coached by Vladimir Sidorov. In 1988 Summer Olympics in Soul, she won bronze medal. In 1992 Summer Olympics in Barcelona she finished 5th. She is 3-times Estonian champion. 1975–1977 she was a member of Estonian national shooting team. She was also a member of Soviet Union national shooting team.

Since about late-1970s she is living in Russia.
