= Wu Xiaoxuan =

Chinese sport shooter

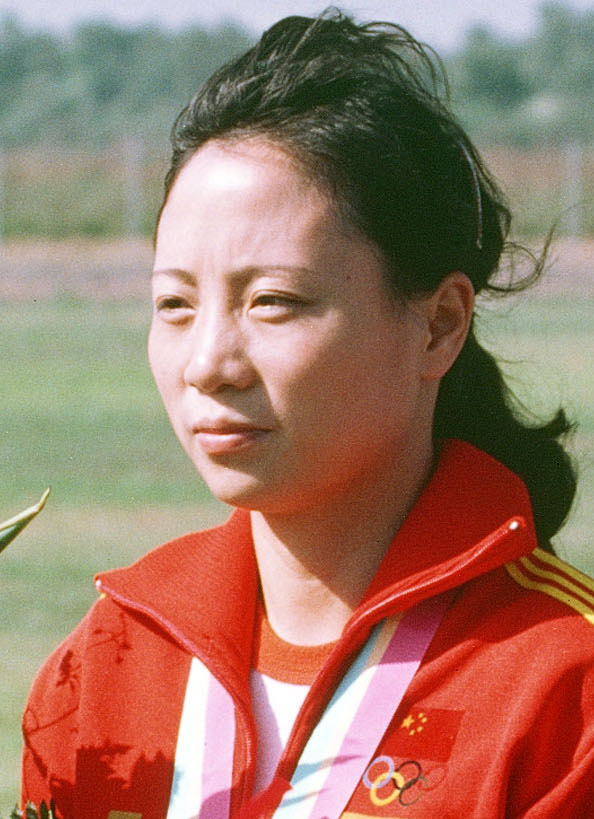
- Wu Xiaoxuan at the 1984 Olympics

Medal record

Women's shooting

Representing China

Olympic Games
Gold medal – first place	1984 Los Angeles	50m Rifle
Bronze medal – third place	1984 Los Angeles	10m Air Rifle

Wu Xiaoxuan (Chinese: 吴小旋; Pinyin: Wú Xiǎoxuán; born 26 January 1958 in Hangzhou, Zhejiang) is a female Chinese sports shooter who competed in the 1984 Summer Olympics, where she won the gold medal in the women's standard small-bore rifle 3x20 competition. Wu is the first Chinese female athlete to win an Olympic gold medal.

After her retirement, Wu worked as Director of physical culture in Hangzhou, and then moved to the United States in 1991, studying at University of Southern California. She now lives a low-profile life in the United States, working in a hat factory.
