= Nonka Matova =

Bulgarian sport shooter

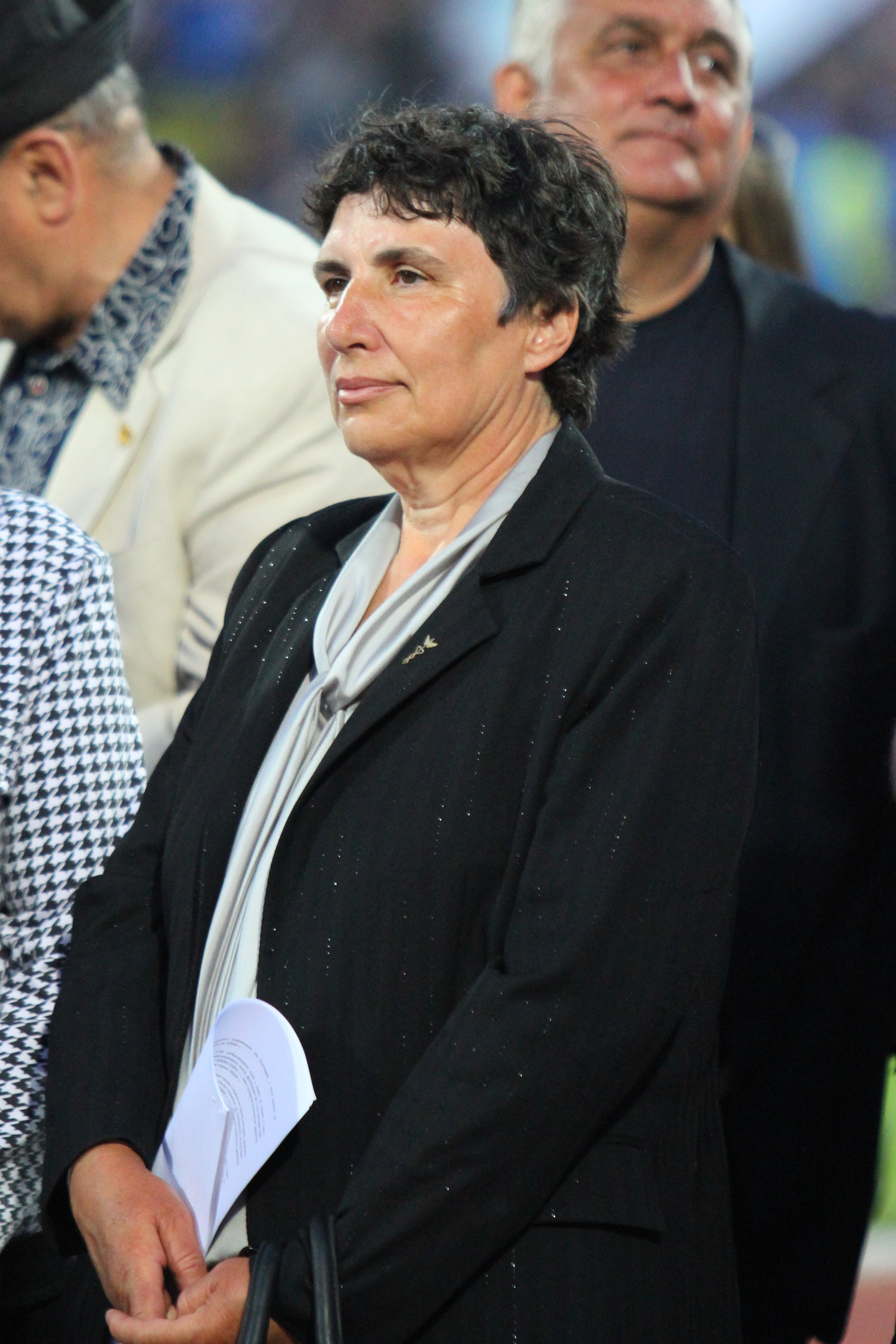

Personal information
- Full name: Nonka Decheva Matova
- Born: 20 October 1954 (age 71) Plovdiv, Bulgaria
Medal record
Women's shooting
Representing Bulgaria
Olympic Games
Silver medal – second place	1992 Barcelona	50 m rifle 3 positions

Nonka Decheva Matova (née Shatarova, Bulgarian: Нонка Матова Дечева; born 20 October 1954) is a Bulgarian police officer and rifle shooter who won silver at the 1992 Olympics, gold at the alternative to the 1984 Olympics, "Druzhba" tournament in Moscow, Russia and sixteen medals (including five gold) at World Championships.

Nonka Matova set 11 world (two in category for men) and 28 European (two in category for men) records in rifle shooting. She won over 600 medals in sports competitions, 76 of them at European championships and 16 at world championships. Matova received the prize for the most accurate shooter on the Balkan Peninsula and the prize for the most accurate shooter in the world in 1985. She is one of the few Bulgarians to compete at six Olympic Games (1976–80, 1988–2000).

Matova was born in Plovdiv in 1954. At the 50m Rifle Three Positions World Championships, she won individual silver in 1974 and bronze in 1998. She was part of the Bulgarian team that won silver in 1974, gold in 1986 and 1990, and bronze in 1998.

At the 50m Rifle Prone World Championships, she won individual bronze in 1974 and silver in 1986. She was also part of the Bulgarian team that won silver in 1986 and 1990, and was thus involved in all Bulgarian medals in the event in its first forty years (1996–2006) and counting.

At the 10m Air Rifle World Championships, she won individual bronze in 1989 and was part of the Bulgarian team that won gold in 1985, 1987, and 1989.

She has worked as a police officer for Bulgaria's Interior Ministry since 1979, and in 2003 was promoted to Major-General. She became a Member of the 39th National Assembly of Bulgaria from 2001 to 2005 for the constituency 17-PLOVDIV OKRAG.

General Matova also owns a Shooting Club.

== See also ==
- List of athletes with the most appearances at Olympic Games
