= Małgorzata Książkiewicz =

Polish sport shooter (born 1967)

Personal information
- Born: 5 May 1967 (age 59) Zielona Góra, Poland
Medal record
Women's shooting
Representing Poland
Olympic Games
Bronze medal – third place	1992 Barcelona	50 m rifle 3 positions

Małgorzata Książkiewicz (born 5 May 1967) is a Polish sport shooter. She won a bronze medal in 50 metre rifle three positions at the 1992 Summer Olympics in Barcelona. Książkiewicz was born in Zielona Góra.
