= ISSF 10 meter air rifle =

International Shooting Sports Federation shooting event

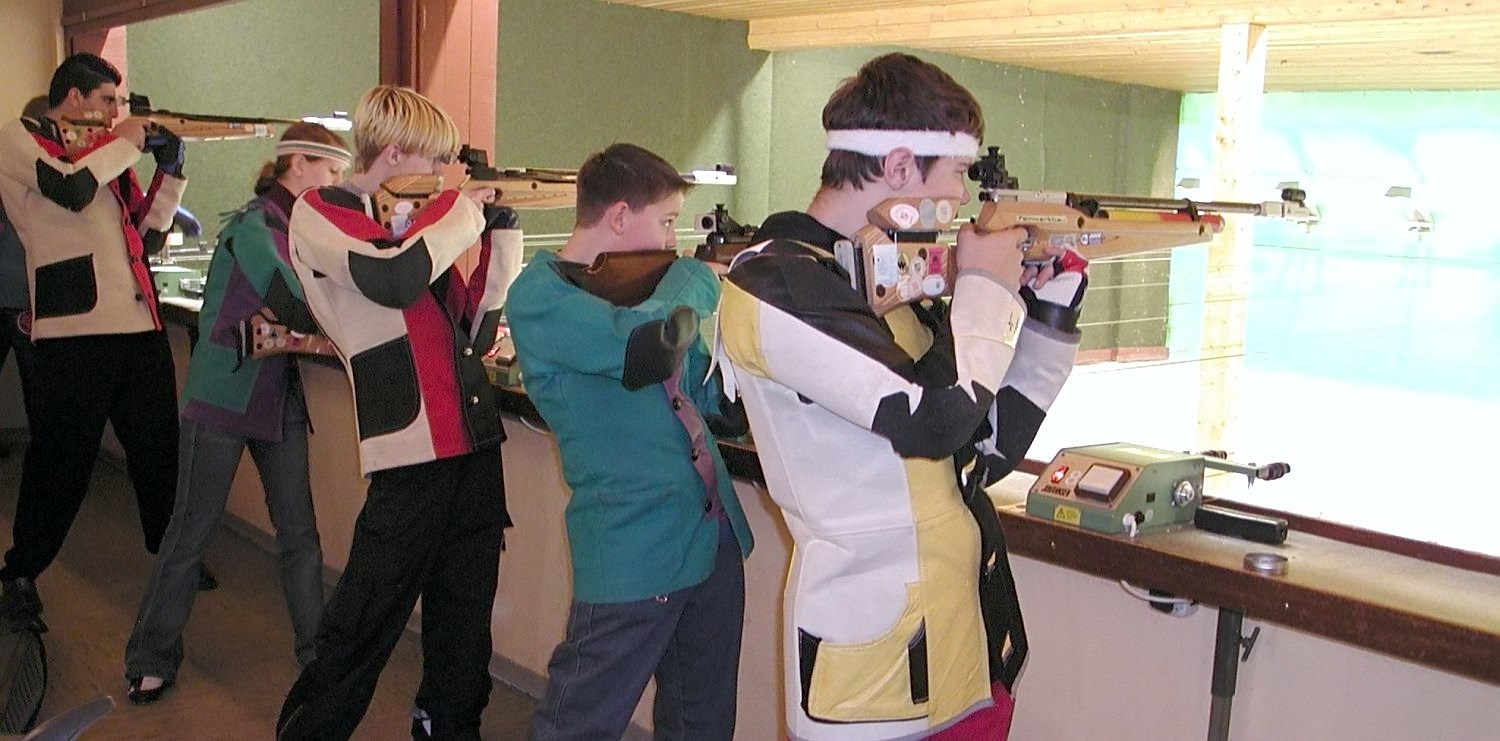

Men
- Number of shots: 60+24
- Olympic Games: Since 1984
- World Championships: Since 1970
- Abbreviation: AR60

Women
- Number of shots: 60+24
- Olympic Games: Since 1984
- World Championships: Since 1970
- Abbreviation: AR60W

10 meter air rifle is an International Shooting Sports Federation (ISSF) shooting event, shot at a bullseye target over a distance of 10 meters (10.94 yards) using a 4.5 mm (0.177 in) calibre air rifle with a maximum weight of 5.5 kg (12.13 lb). It is one of the ISSF sports governed in shooting sports included in the Summer Olympics since the 1984 Los Angeles Games.

Shots are fired from the standing position only, as opposed to some other airgun disciplines such as for three positions (popular in the United States) or in disabled sports, which allows sitting and prone positions. Due to the low recoil of air guns and the need for stability, the shooter frequently adopts a deliberately lordotic and scoliotic posture, which allows the non-dominant elbow to be rested against the chest to support the forearm and improves the stability of the shooting stance. The use of specialized rigidly padded vest is allowed to prevent chronic back injury, which can be caused by prolonged asymmetric load on the spinal column.

The major competitions are the Olympic Games every four years and the ISSF World Shooting Championships every four years (the Games and the Championships are held two years apart). In addition, the event is included in the ISSF World Cup series, the ISSF World Cup Final, continental championships, and many other international and national competitions. It is an indoor sport. In many clubs and ranges, electronic targets are now being used instead of the traditional paper targets.

Scores in 10-meter air rifles have improved rapidly during the last few decades. During the 1970s, technical advances in the employed match air rifles made the ISSF, known as the International Shooting Union or UIT (French: Union Internationale de Tir) back then, decide to significantly reduce the size of the 10-meter air rifle target to its current dimensions.

== Rules ==
The target, with integer scoring rings shown: total Ø = 45.5 mm. 4 ring Ø = 30.5 mm. 9 ring Ø = 5.5 mm. 10 ring Ø = 0.5 mm, height 1.4 m above the floor

Until 2013, the maximum achievable aggregate score (qualification + final) was 709 for men (600 + 109.0) and 509 for women (400 + 109.0). The score for the qualification used integers (10 as the highest score per shot), and the final stage included decimals (10.9 as the highest score per shot). No top competitor achieved an official perfect aggregate score under these rules.

Under rules introduced in 2013, finals became "start from zero", with qualification scores no longer carried forward, and the best eight competitors started all over again. In the 20-shot final, the highest achievable final score was 218.0 points. No competitor achieved an official perfect final score under these rules.

Rules introduced in 2018 ended the differences in competition format between male and female athletes. Also, the final was changed to 24 shots (5 shots + 5 shots + 14 shots elimination phase). In the final, the highest achievable final score is 261.6 points. Until 2020, no top competitor has achieved an official perfect final score under these rules. The current world record is 253.7 for men and 252.9 for women.

=== Qualification Round ===
==== Pre 2013 qualification rules ====
The course of fire was an unlimited number of sighter shots followed by 60 competition shots for men or 40 competition shots for women, all fired within 75 minutes for men or 50 minutes for women. During this initial or qualification phase, a maximum of 10 points was awarded for each shot. Top competitors sometimes achieved maximum results (a "possible") for the initial or qualification phase (600 for men and 400 for women). Most of these full marks were achieved non-directly ISSF supervised international and national-level matches and championships, where official ISSF-recognized world records cannot be set. This leads to many national records being equal to the world records.

==== 2013 to 2018 qualification rules ====
The course of fire was 60 competition shots for men or 40 for women, and all fired within 75 minutes for men or 50 minutes for women. During this initial or qualification phase, a maximum of 10.9 points was awarded for each shot. The highest possible 60-shot score for men was 654.0 points, and for women, 436.0 points.

==== 2018 qualification rules ====
ISSF rules introduced in 2018 ended gender differences, expanding the 40-shot qualification phase for women to 60 shots and setting the highest possible 60-shot score at 654.0 points.

=== Finals ===
==== Pre 2013 finals rules ====
The top eight shooters from the qualification round moved on to a finals event consisting of 10 shots – each decimal scored to a maximum of 10.9 – with the cumulative score determining the winner (qualification + finals score). Every scoring ring is 5 mm wide and sub-divided in 0.5 mm (≈ 0.1719 MOA) increments in 10 "subrings". Like the other scoring rings, the maximum of 10.9 is derived from an additional set of 10 "subrings" within the center 10-point circle, increasing in 0.1 point value as the rings approach the center of the target.

==== 2013 to 2018 finals rules ====
In November 2012, The ISSF announced other final rules. This finals rules had the best eight shooters starting from zero, eliminating the qualification scores that used to be combined with the finals scores for competition results. The format consisted of 20 final shots scored in 0.1 point value as the rings approach the center of the target, setting the highest possible 20 shots score at 218.0 points.

==== 2018 finals rules ====
Since 2018, the ISSF finals rules have ranked the eight best shooters, starting from zero and eliminating qualification scores. The format consists of 2 series of 5 shots each, to be fired within 250 seconds per series. This is followed by 14 single shots fired on command, with 50 seconds for each shot. Eliminations of the lowest-scoring finalists begin after the tenth shot (series + first 2 single shots) and continue after every two shots until the gold and silver medalists are decided. There is a total of 24 finals shots, setting the highest possible 24 shots score at 261.6 points. If there is a tie for the lowest-ranking athlete to be eliminated, the tied athletes will fire additional tie-breaking single shots until the tie is broken.

== Equipment ==
=== Air rifle ===
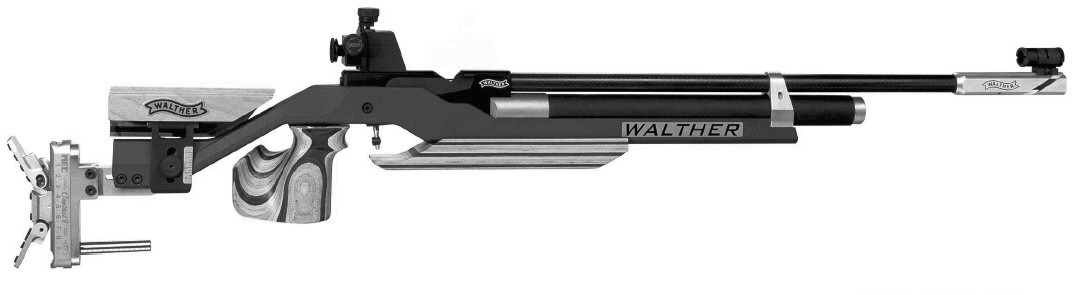
A typical PCP match air rifle.

The occurrence of high scores in modern times is mainly due to the continuous development of precision match air rifles from spring-piston type designs into single-stroke pneumatic and then regulated pre-charged pneumatic (PCP) designs. Modern PCP match rifles feature regulated powerplants to minimize shot-to-shot variation in output pressure and resulting muzzle velocity. Modern PCP rifles are practically recoilless and vibration-free. Mechanical and electronic match triggers offer low shot development time (at low lock times, factors like the dwell time of the pellet in the barrel become influential). Weight and balance can be tailored via an adjustable stock and various accessories to the individual shooter's preferences, promoting comfortable and accurate shooting. ISSF rules mandate the use of non-magnifying diopter and globe sights.

Combined with appropriate match pellets, these rifles produce a consistent 10-ring performance, so a sub-10.0 average result can be attributed to the participant, and at the 2019 top competition level, a 10.5 average result can be regarded as excellent.

=== Ammunition ===
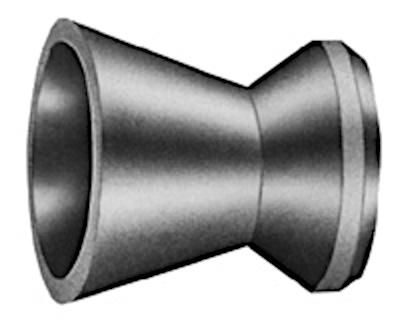
A typical 4.5 mm (.177 in) 10 m air rifle match pellet

For the 10-meter air rifle and air pistol disciplines, match-grade diabolo pellets are used. These pellets are wadcutter, meaning the pellet head is nearly completely flat. This leaves smooth-edged round holes in paper targets and allows easy gauging for scoring. Match pellets are offered in tins and more elaborate packaging, avoiding deformation and other damage that could impair their uniformity.

Match air rifle shooters are encouraged to perform shooting group tests with their gun clamped in a machine rest to establish which particular match pellet type performs best for their particular air gun. To facilitate maximum performance out of various air guns the leading match pellet manufacturers produce pellets with graduated "head sizes", which means the pellets are offered with front diameters from 4.48 mm (0.176 in) up to 4.52 mm (0.178 in).

However at higher and top competitive levels, even these variations are thought too coarse-grained and match pellets are batch-tested; that is, the specific gun is mounted in a machine rest test rig and pellets from a particular production run on a specific machine with the same ingredients fed into the process (a batch) are test-fired through the gun. Many different batches will be tested in this manner, and the pellets which give the smallest consistent group size without fliers (shots which fall outside of the main group) will be selected (small but inconsistent group sizes are not valuable for a top competitor); and the shooter will then purchase several tens of thousands of pellets from that batch. Group sizes of 4.5 mm (0.177 in) diameter are theoretically possible, but practically shot groups of 5.0 mm (0.197 in) are considered highly competitive. Unbatched ammunition, especially if the air gun is not regularly cleaned, is generally thought to be capable of only 8.0 mm (0.315 in) diameter group sizes. Batch-testing match pellets for a particular gun is not considered worthwhile until the shooter reaches a high proficiency level (around the 95% level, i.e., 570 for the qualification round).

== Gallery ==
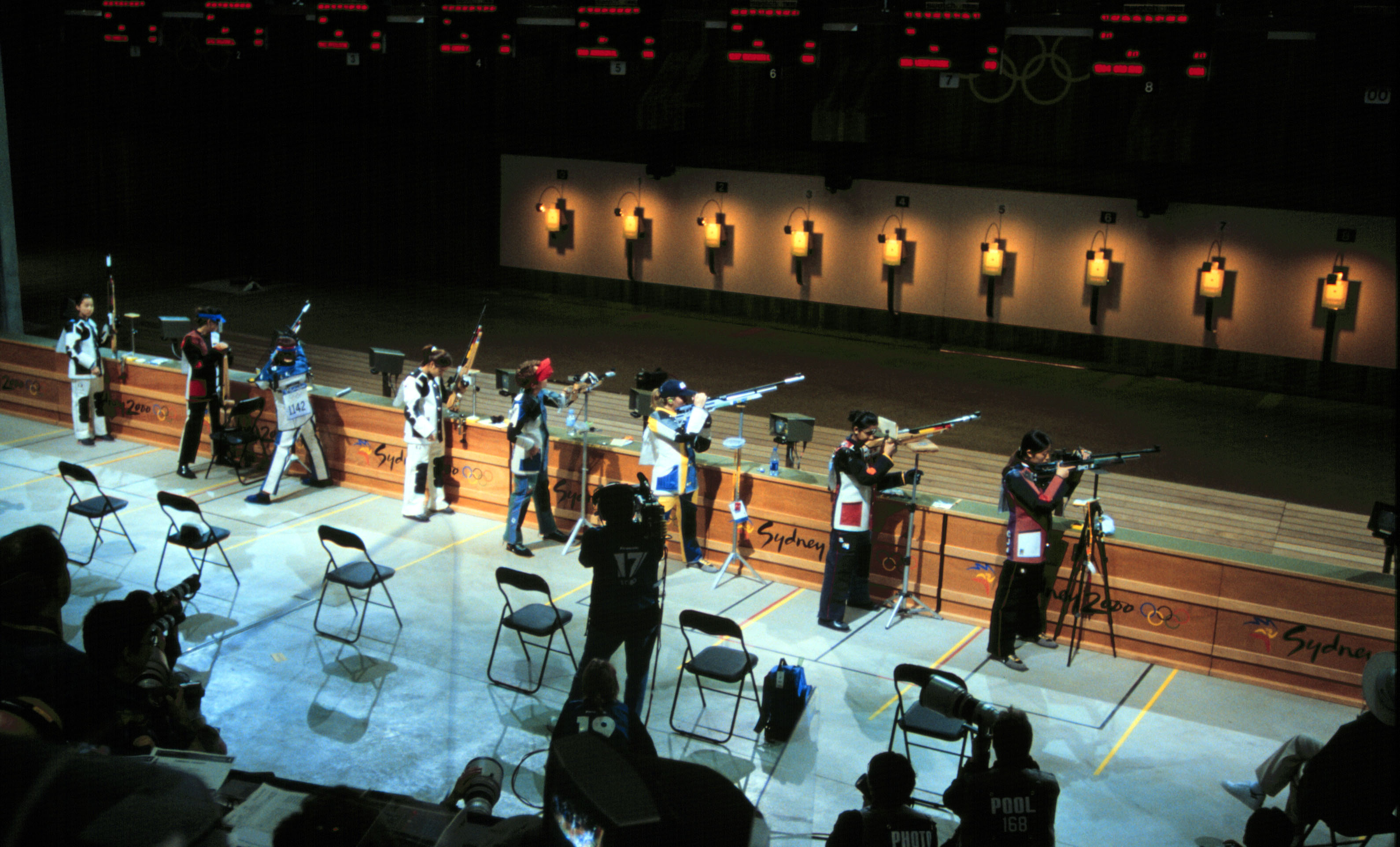
Women's 10 m Air Rifle competition at the 2000 Summer Olympics in Sydney

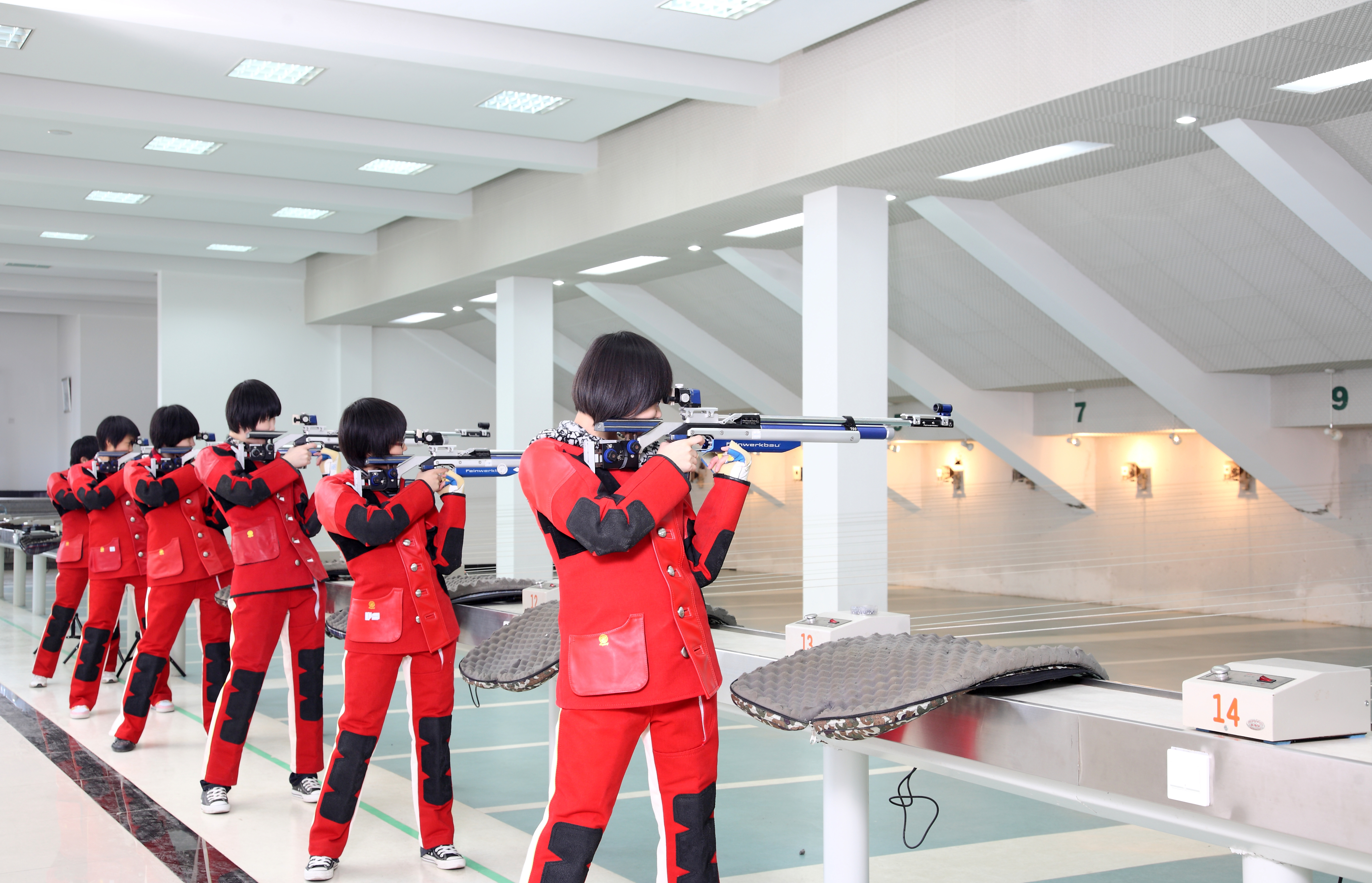
Chinese students shooting 10m air rifle on their school range

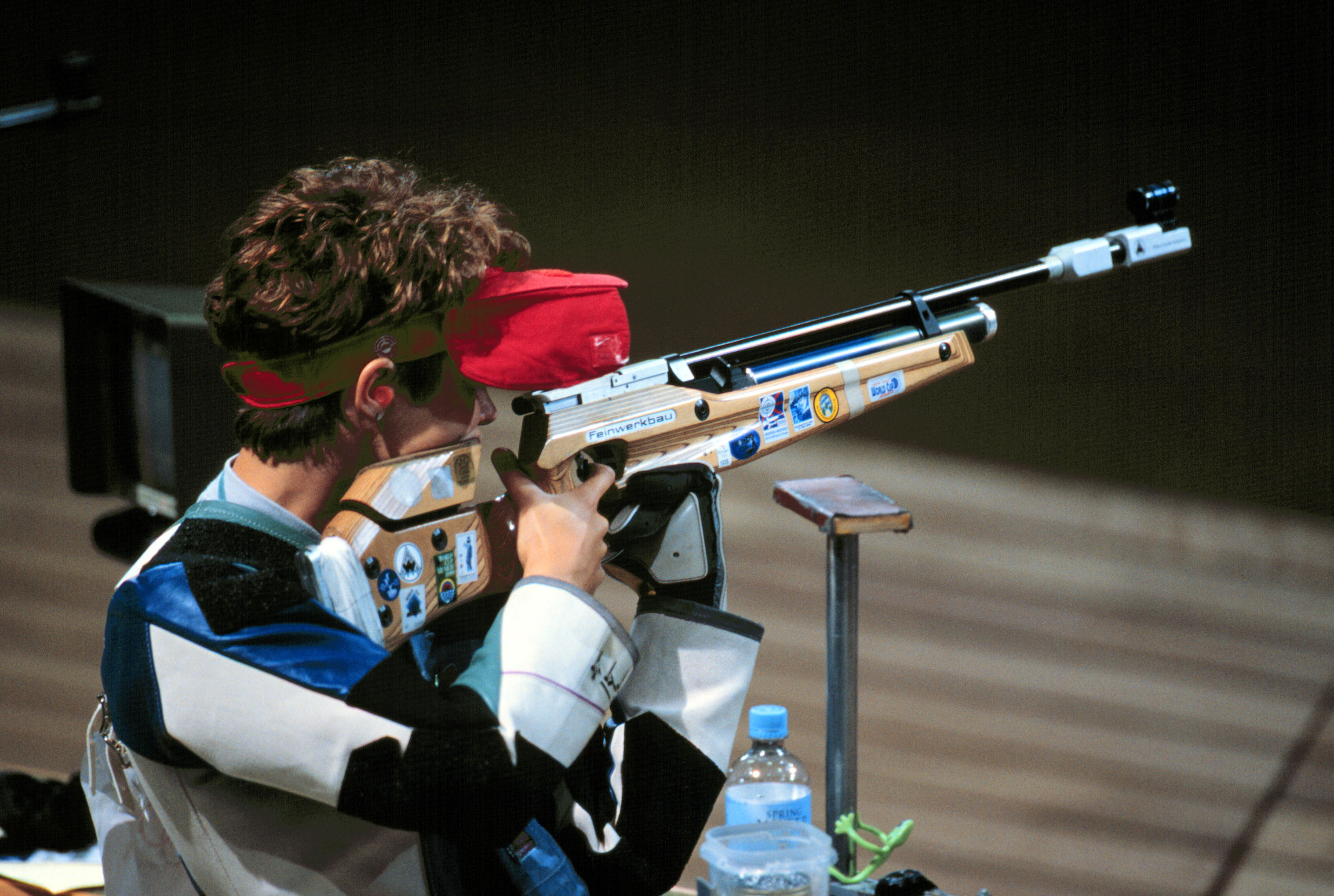
Olympic gold medalist Nancy Johnson aims carefully as she competes in the women's 10 m Air Rifle competition at the 2000 Summer Olympics in Sydney

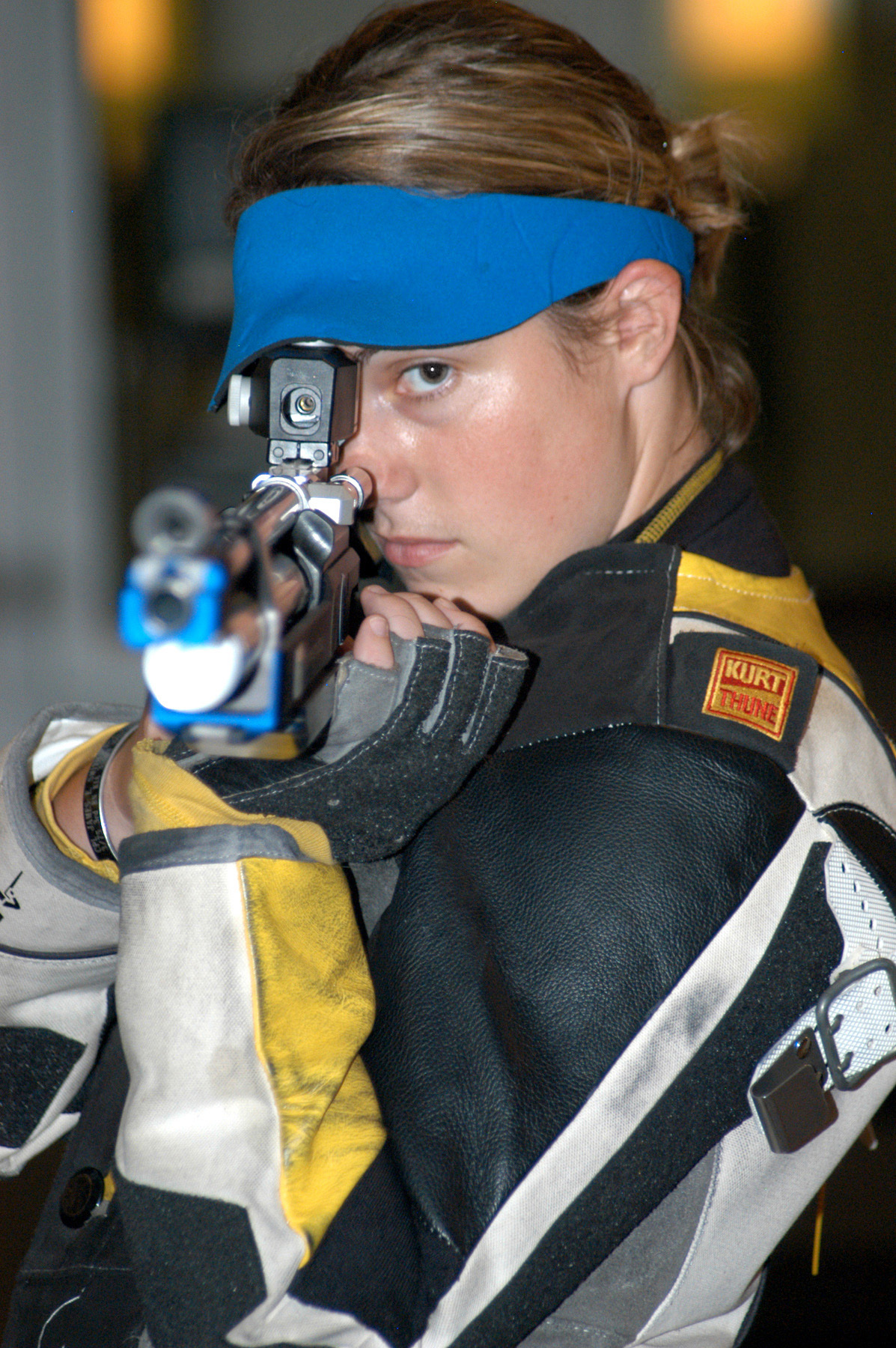
Hattie Johnson aiming her air rifle. She competed in the women's 10 m Air Rifle competition at the 2004 Summer Olympics in Athens, Greece

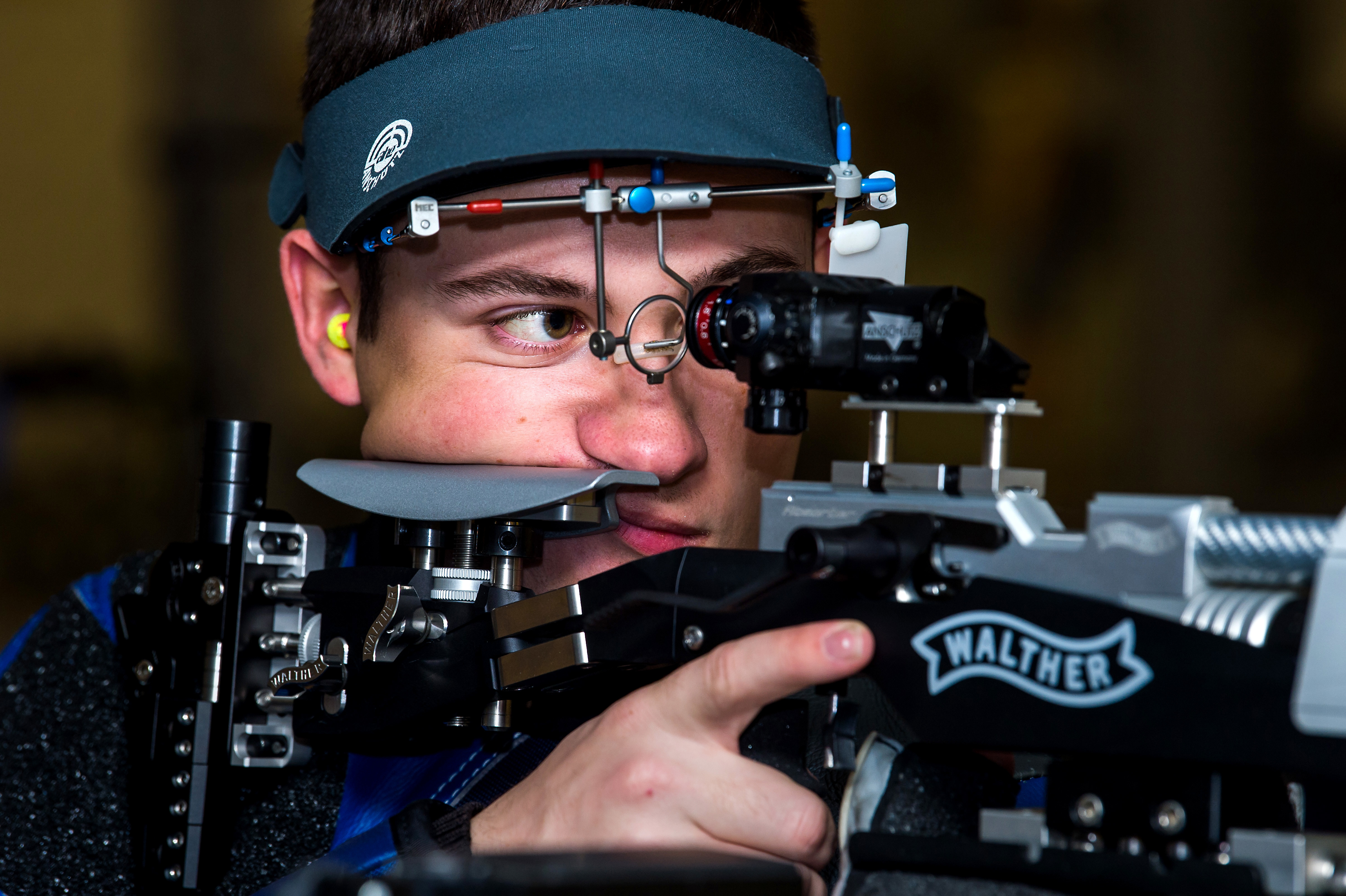
U.S. Air Force Academy Cadet Peter Fiori using corrective shooting glasses as a visual aid

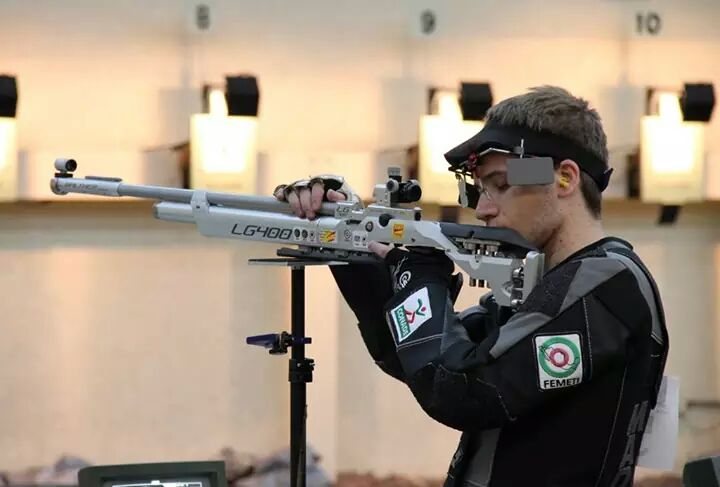
Competitor resting between shots during an ISSF competition

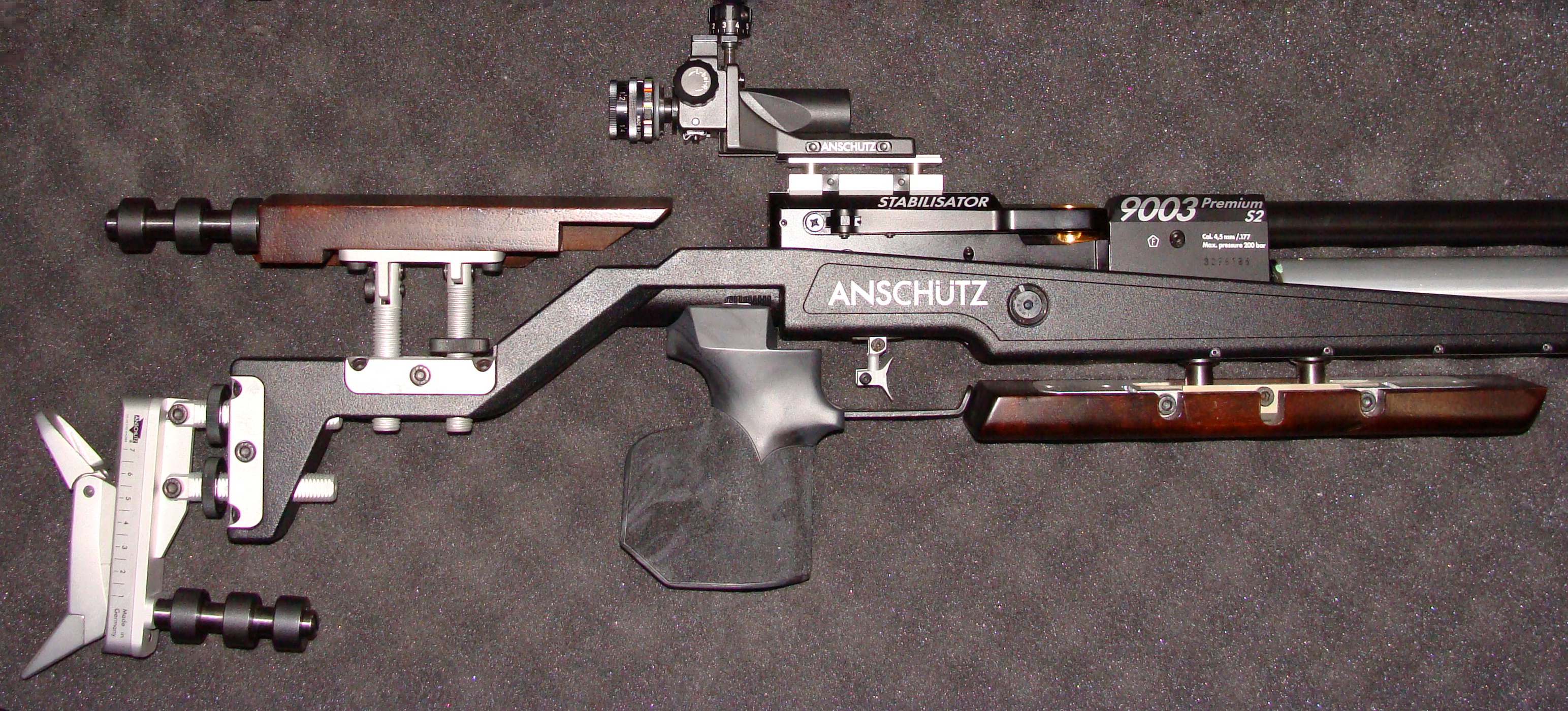
User adjustable stock of a PCP match rifle

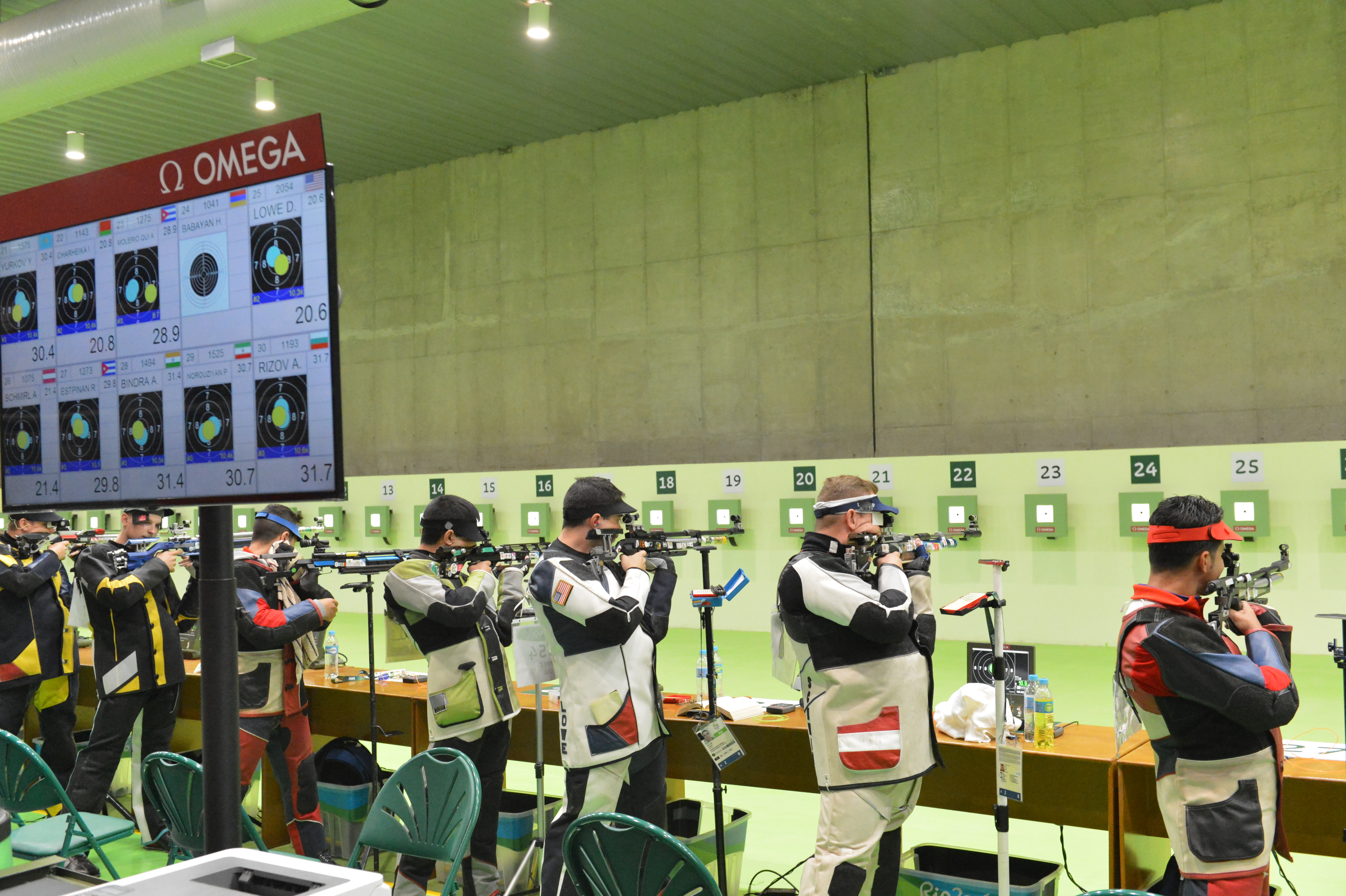
Electronic scoring system used at the 2016 Summer Olympics in Rio de Janeiro, Brazil

== World Championships, Men ==
| Year | Place | Gold | Silver | Bronze |
|---|---|---|---|---|
| 1966 | (West Germany) Wiesbaden | Gerd Kuemmet (FRG) | August Hollenstein (SUI) | Lajos Papp (HUN) |
| 1970 | (United States) Phoenix | Gottfried Kustermann (FRG) | Klaus Zähringer (FRG) | Rolf Blomberg (SWE) |
| 1974 | (Switzerland) Thun | Eugeniusz Pędzisz (POL) | Lanny Bassham (USA) | David Kramer (USA) |
| 1978 | (South Korea) Seoul | Oswald Schlipf (FRG) | Barry Dagger (GBR) | Zuccoli G. (ITA) |
| 1979 | (South Korea) Seoul | Walter Hillenbrand (FRG) | Hans Braem (SUI) | Barry Dagger (GBR) |
| 1981 | (Dominican Republic) Santo Domingo | Pascal Bessy (FRA) | Daniel Nipkow (SUI) | Kurt Rieth (FRG) |
| 1982 | (Venezuela) Caracas | Frank Rettkowski (GDR) | Pierre-Alain Dufaux (SUI) | Andreas Wolfram (GDR) |
| 1983 | (Austria) Innsbruck | Philippe Heberlé (FRA) | Juri Zavolodko (URS) | Frank Rettkowski (GDR) |
| 1985 | Mexico City | Philippe Heberlé (FRA) | Bernhard Suess (FRG) | Andreas Kronthaler (AUT) |
| 1986 | (Germany) Suhl | Johann Riederer (FRG) | Daniel Durben (USA) | Bernhard Suess (FRG) |
| 1987 | (Hungary) Budapest | Kirill Ivanov (URS) | Matthew Suggs (USA) | Harald Stenvaag (NOR) |
| 1989 | (Socialist Federal Republic of Yugoslavia) Sarajevo | Jean-Pierre Amat (FRA) | Juri Fedkin (URS) | Olaf Hess (GDR) |
| 1990 | (Soviet Union) Moscow | Johann Riederer (FRG) | Rajmond Debevec (YUG) | Masaru Yanagida (JPN) |
| 1991 | (Norway) Stavanger | Harald Stenvaag (NOR) | Eugeni Aleinikov (URS) | Nils Petter Haakedal (NOR) |
| 1994 | (Italy) Milan | Boris Polak (ISR) | Anatoli Klimenko (BLR) | Frank Dobler (GER) |
| 1998 | (Spain) Barcelona | Artem Khadjibekov (RUS) | Jozef Gönci (SVK) | Kean Bae Chae (KOR) |
| 2002 | (Finland) Lahti | Jason Parker (USA) | Li Jie (CHN) | Eugeni Aleinikov (RUS) |
| 2006 | (Croatia) Zagreb | Abhinav Bindra (IND) | Alin George Moldoveanu (ROM) | Qinan Zhu (CHN) |
| 2010 | (Germany) Munich | Niccolò Campriani (ITA) | Péter Sidi (HUN) | Gagan Narang (IND) |
| 2014 | (Spain) Granada | Haoran Yang (CHN) | Nazar Louginets (RUS) | Vitali Bubnovich (BLR) |
| 2018 | (South Korea) Changwon | Sergey Kamenskiy (RUS) | Petar Gorsa (CRO) | Miran Maričić (CRO) |
| 2022 | (Egypt) Cairo | Rudrankksh Balasaheb Patil (IND) | Danilo Dennis Sollazzo (ITA) | Sheng Lihao (CHN) |
| 2023 | (Azerbaijan) Baku | Victor Lindgren (SWE) | Yang Haoran (CHN) | František Smetana (CZE) |
| 2025 | (Egypt) Cairo | Maximilian Dallinger (GER) | Victor Lindgren (SWE) | Sheng Lihao (CHN) |
| 2026 | (Qatar) Doha | Sheng Lihao (CHN) | Ma Sihan (CHN) | Miran Maričić (CRO) |

== World Championships, Men Team ==
| Year | Place | Gold | Silver | Bronze |
|---|---|---|---|---|
| 1966 | Wiesbaden | Switzerland; August Hollenstein; Erwin Vogt; Hans Simonet; Kurt Mueller | West Germany; Gerd Kuemmet; Ernst Beith; Bernd Klingner; Gunter Vetter | Soviet Union; Ludwig Lustberg; Eduard Jarosh; Vladimir Konyakhin; Vasily Borisov |
| 1970 | Phoenix | West Germany; Peter Kohnke; Bernd Klingner; Gottfried Kustermann; Klaus Zähringer | United States; Lanny Bassham; David Boyd; John Robert Foster; Lones Wigger | East Germany; Dieter Munzert; Hartmut Sommer; Helman Uhlemann; Uto Wunderlich |
| 1974 | Thun | West Germany; Franz Hamm; Gottfried Kustermann; Bernd Ramms; Wolfgang Ruehle | United States; Lanny Bassham; David Cramer; Edward Schumacher; John Writer | Poland; Stanislaw Marucha; Eugeniusz Pędzisz; Romuald Simionov; Andrzej Trajda |
| 1978 | Seoul | West Germany; Kurt Hillenbrand; Gottfried Kustermann; Oswald Schlipf; Werner Seibold | United States; John Akemon; Lanny Bassham; Kurt Fitz Randolph; David Kimes | South Korea; Gyong Hwan Bae; Ja Hyoun Myoung; Jang Woon Seo; Deok Ha Yoon |
| 1979 | Seoul | Switzerland; Kuno Bertschy; Hans Braem; Hansueli Minder; Anton Mattle | United States; David Cramer; Ray Carter; Michael Gross; Ernest van de Zande | Great Britain; Malcolm Cooper; John Churchill; Barry Dagger; Robert Joyce |
| 1981 | Santo Domingo | West Germany; Walter Hillenbrand; Kurt Hillenbrand; Kurt Rieth; Oswald Schlipf | France; Pascal Bessy; Patrice de Mullenheim; Daniel Labrune; Dominique Maquin | Norway; Amund Bjerbnes; Arnt-Olav Haugland; Per Erik Lokken; Harald Stenvaag |
| 1982 | Caracas | Norway; Arnt-Olav Haugland; Per Erik Lokken; Svien Sotberg; Harald Stenvaag | West Germany; Kurt Hillenbrand; Kurt Rieth; Oswald Schlipf; Bernhard Suess | East Germany; Bernd Hartstein; Sven Martini; Frank Rettkowski; Andreas Wolfram |
| 1983 | Innsbruck | France; Jean-Pierre Amat; Michel Bury; Philippe Heberlé | West Germany; Peter Heinz; Bernhard Suess; Hubert Suess | Soviet Union; Alexander Mitrofanov; Viktor Vlasov; Juri Zavolodko |
| 1985 | Mexico City | France; Jean-Pierre Amat; Philippe Heberlé; Dominique Maquin | Yugoslavia; Rajmond Debevec; Sacir Dzeko; Goran Maksimović | West Germany; Kurt Hillenbrand; Walter Hillenbrand; Bernhard Suess |
| 1986 | Suhl | West Germany; Johann Riederer; Hubert Suess; Bernhard Suess | United States; Daniel Durben; Kurt Fitz Randolph; Robert Foth | Norway; Arnt-Olav Haugland; Harald Stenvaag; Kare Inge Viken |
| 1987 | Budapest | United States; Daniel Durben; Robert Foth; Matthew Suggs | Yugoslavia; Rajmond Debevec; Sacir Dzeko; Goran Maksimović | Soviet Union; Juri Fedkin; Kirill Ivanov; Juri Zavolodko |
| 1989 | Sarajevo | France; Jean-Pierre Amat; Franck Badiou; Nicolas Berthelot | Soviet Union; Viatcheslav Botchkarev; Juri Fedkin; Sergei Martynov | West Germany; Hannes Hirschvogel; Johann Riederer; Matthias Stich |
| 1990 | Moscow | West Germany; Hannes Hirschvogel; Johann Riederer; Matthias Stich | East Germany; Olaf Hess; Sven Martini; Frank Rettkowski | South Korea; Young Chul Cha; Tae Jin Eom; Jung Mo Yoo |
| 1991 | Stavanger | Norway; Nils Petter Haakedal; Leif Steinar Rolland; Harald Stenvaag | Soviet Union; Eugeni Aleinikov; Juri Fedkin; Sergei Schedrin | Germany; Hannes Hirschvogel; Johann Riederer; Matthias Stich |
| 1994 | Milan | Belarus; Anatoli Klimenko; Georgi Nekhaev; Sergei Martynov | Czech Republic; Milan Bakeš; Petr Kůrka; Dalimil Nejezchleba | Russia; Juri Fedkin; Artem Khadjibekov; Sergei Schedrin |
| 1998 | Barcelona | Russia; Artem Khadjibekov; Eugeni Aleinikov; Konstantin Prikhodtchenko | South Korea; Kean Bae Chae; Young Sueb Lim; Jung Jun Ko | Slovakia; Jozef Gönci; Miroslav Svorada; Peter Bubernik |
| 2002 | Lahti | Russia; Konstantin Prikhodtchenko; Eugeni Aleinikov; Artem Khadjibekov | China; Li Jie; Fu Zhang; Yalin Cai | United States; Jason Parker; Matthew Emmons; Troy Bassham |
| 2006 | Zagreb | China; Li Jie; Qinan Zhu; Lei Zhang | Russia; Konstantin Prikhodtchenko; Denis Sokolov; Sergey Kruglov | Austria; Christian Planer; Thomas Farnik; Mario Knögler |
| 2010 | Munich | China; Wang Tao; Qinan Zhu; Liu Tianyou | Russia; Konstantin Prikhodtchenko; Denis Sokolov; Sergey Kamenskiy | Italy; Niccolò Campriani; Marco De Nicolo; Giorgio Sommaruga |
| 2014 | Granada | China; Liu Tianyou; Yang Haoran; Cao Yifei | Russia; Nazar Louginets; Denis Sokolov; Sergey Kruglov | Belarus; Vitali Bubnovich; Illia Charheika; Yury Shcherbatsevich |
| 2018 | Changwon | China; Yang Haoran; Yu Haonan; Hui Zicheng | Russia; Sergey Kamenskiy; Vladimir Maslennikov; Alexander Dryagin | South Korea; Nam Taeyun; Kim Hyeonjun; Song Soojoo |
| 2022 | Cairo | India; Rudrankksh Balasaheb Patil; Kiran Ankush Jadhav; Arjun Babuta | China; Sheng Lihao; Song Buhan; Yang Haoran | Serbia; Milenko Sebić; Milutin Stefanović; Lazar Kovačević |

== World Championships, Women ==
| Year | Place | Gold | Silver | Bronze |
|---|---|---|---|---|
| 1970 | Phoenix | Tamara Cherkasova (URS) | Desanka Perović (YUG) | Tatiana Ratnikova (URS) |
| 1974 | Thun | Tatiana Ratnikova (URS) | Kira Boiko (URS) | Baiba Zarina (URS) |
| 1978 | Seoul | Wanda Oliver (USA) | Karen Monez (USA) | Nam Soon Park (KOR) |
| 1979 | Seoul | Karen Monez (USA) | Wanda Jewell (USA) | Kyung Ok Chung (KOR) |
| 1981 | Santo Domingo | Svetlana Komaristova (URS) | Thoril Brodahl-Radet (NOR) | Young Mi Kim (KOR) |
| 1982 | Caracas | Sigrid Lang (FRG) | Lessia Leskiv (URS) | Marlies Helbig (GDR) |
| 1983 | Innsbruck | Marlies Helbig (GDR) | Xiaoxuan Wu (CHN) | Silvia Sperber (FRG) |
| 1985 | Mexico City | Eva Forian (HUN) | Barbara Troeger (AUT) | Vesela Letcheva (BUL) |
| 1986 | Suhl | Vesela Letcheva (BUL) | Valentina Cherkasova (URS) | Deena Wigger (USA) |
| 1987 | Budapest | Vesela Letcheva (BUL) | Irene Dufaux Suter (SUI) | Birgit Zeiske (FRG) |
| 1989 | Sarajevo | Vesela Letcheva (BUL) | Anna Maloukhina (URS) | Nonka Matova (BUL) |
| 1990 | Moscow | Eva Joo (HUN) | Renata Mauer (POL) | Jolande Swinkels (NED) |
| 1991 | Stavanger | Eva Forian (HUN) | Svitlana Seledkova (URS) | Wera Stamm (GER) |
| 1994 | Milan | Sonja Pfeilschifter (GER) | Christine Chuard (FRA) | Renata Mauer (POL) |
| 1998 | Barcelona | Sonja Pfeilschifter (GER) | Renata Mauer (POL) | Jung Mi Kim (KOR) |
| 2002 | Lahti | Kateřina Kůrková (CZE) | Li Du (CHN) | Sonja Pfeilschifter (GER) |
| 2006 | Zagreb | Li Du (CHN) | Kateřina Kůrková (CZE) | Olga Dovgun (KAZ) |
| 2010 | Munich | Yi Siling (CHN) | Wu Liuxi (CHN) | Elania Nardelli (ITA) |
| 2014 | (Spain) Granada | Petra Zublasing (ITA) | Yi Siling (CHN) | Sonja Pfeilschifter (GER) |
| 2018 | (South Korea) Changwon | Im Ha-na (KOR) | Anjum Moudgil (IND) | Jung Eun-hea (KOR) |
| 2022 | (Egypt) Cairo | Alison Marie Weisz (USA) | Huang Yuting (CHN) | Zhang Yu (CHN) |
| 2023 | (Azerbaijan) Baku | Han Jiayu (CHN) | Wang Zhilin (CHN) | Mehuli Ghosh (IND) |
| 2025 | (Egypt) Cairo | Ban Hyo-jin (KOR) | Wang Zifei (CHN) | Elavenil Valarivan (IND) |
| 2026 | (Qatar) Doha | Ban Hyo-jin (KOR) | Han Jiayu (CHN) | Wang Zifei (CHN) |

== World Championships, Women Team ==
| Year | Place | Gold | Silver | Bronze |
|---|---|---|---|---|
| 1970 | Phoenix | Yugoslavia; Magdalena Herold; Mirjana Masic; Desanka Perovic | Soviet Union; Tamara Cherkasova; Lucia Fagereva; Tatiana Ratnikova | West Germany; Ingrid Kappes; Monika Riesterer; Anneliese Rhomberg |
| 1974 | Thun | Soviet Union; Kira Boiko; Tatiana Ratnikova; Baiba Zarina | Poland; Elzbieta Janik; Elzbieta Kowalewska; Irena Wierzbowska-Mlotkowska | West Germany; Elke Becker; Elisabeth Balș; Elisabeth Boehmer |
| 1978 | Seoul | United States; Karen Monez; Wanda Oliver; Sue Ann Sandusky | South Korea; Young Soon Kim; Nam Soon Park; Joo Hee Yoo | West Germany; Elisabeth Balș; Monika Sonnet; Jutta Sperlich |
| 1979 | Seoul | United States; Becky Braun; Wanda Jewell; Karen Monez | South Korea; Kyung Ok Chung; Nam Soon Park; Duk Nam Yoon | Great Britain; Sarah Cooper; Leslie Dodds; Irene Daw |
| 1981 | Santo Domingo | Soviet Union; Baiba Berklava; Valentina Cherkasova; Svetlana Komaristova | Norway; Thoril Brodahl-Radet; Elisabeth Brodahl; Anne Grethe Jeppesen | Bulgaria; Anna Kirova; Vesela Letcheva; Anka Pelova |
| 1982 | Caracas | East Germany; Gilda Gorzkulla; Marlies Helbig; Marlies Moch | United States; Wanda Jewell; Karen Monez; Gloria Parmentier | Soviet Union; Svetlana Komaristova; Lessia Leskiv; Anna Malukhova |
| 1983 | Innsbruck | West Germany; Ulrike Holmer; Sigrid Lang; Silvia Sperber | Hungary; Eva Forian; Kiss Eva Herrne; Laszlone Hunyadi | Soviet Union; Svetlana Komaristova; Marina Kuznetsova; Lessia Leskiv |
| 1985 | Mexico City | Bulgaria; Krassimira Dontcheva; Vesela Letcheva; Nonka Matova | United States; Mary Godlove; Mary Schweitzer; Pat Spurgin | Hungary; Eva Forian; Laszlone Hunyadi; Agnes Szasz |
| 1986 | Suhl | Finland; Leena Melartin Thune; Pirjo Peltola; Sirpa Ylönen | Switzerland; Gaby Buehlmann; Irene Dufaux Suter; Vreni Ryter | Soviet Union; Valentina Cherkasova; Anna Maloukhina; Marina Suslova |
| 1987 | Budapest | Bulgaria; Krassimira Dontcheva; Vesela Letcheva; Nonka Matova | West Germany; Heike Goette; Carmen Giese; Birgit Zeiske | Soviet Union; Anna Maloukhina; Natalia Oleneva; Irina Shevtsova |
| 1989 | Sarajevo | Bulgaria; Vesela Letcheva; Nonka Matova; Anitza Valkova | Soviet Union; Valentina Cherkasova; Anna Maloukhina; Svitlana Seledkova | Hungary; Marta Bogdan; Eva Forian; Eva Joo |
| 1990 | Moscow | United States; Launi Meili; Kristen Peterson; Deena Wigger | Hungary; Bernadette Fehrentheil; Eva Forian; Eva Joo | Soviet Union; Valentina Cherkasova; Anna Maloukhina; Iryna Shylava |
| 1991 | Stavanger | Soviet Union; Valentina Cherkasova; Svitlana Seledkova; Iryna Shylava | Hungary; Bernadette Fehrentheil; Eva Forian; Eva Joo | United States; Elizabeth Bourland; Launi Meili; Debora Sinclair |
| 1994 | Milan | Germany; Petra Horneber; Bettina Knells; Sonja Pfeilschifter | Russia; Valentina Cherkasova; Irina Gerasimenok; Anna Maloukhina | South Korea; Eun Joo Lee; Mi Ran Oh; Kab Soon Yeo |
| 1998 | Barcelona | Germany; Sonja Pfeilschifter; Petra Horneber; Dunja Beilharz | China; Yinghui Zhao; Hong Shan; Xian Wang | Spain; Marina Pons; Cristina Antolin; Marta Antolin |
| 2002 | Lahti | China; Li Du; Jing Gao; Yinghui Zhao | South Korea; Sun Hwa Seo; Hyung Mi Kim; Dae Young Choi | Ukraine; Natallia Kalnysh; Lessia Leskiv; Nataliya Omelyanenko |
| 2006 | Zagreb | Germany; Sonja Pfeilschifter; Barbara Lechner; Sylvia Aumann | China; Li Du; Yinghui Zhao; Jieyi Tang | Russia; Marina Bobkova; Tatiana Goldobina; Lioubov Galkina |
| 2010 | Munich | Germany; Jessica Mager; Beate Gauss; Sonja Pfeilschifter | China; Yi Siling; Wu Liuxi; Liu Qing | United States; Meghann Morrill; Jamie Lynn Gray; Emily Caruso |
| 2014 | Granada | Germany; Barbara Englender; Sonja Pfeilschifter; Lisa Mueller | China; Yi Siling; Wu Liuxi; Zhang Binbin | Serbia; Andrea Arsovic; Ivana Maksimovic; Katarina Bisercic |
| 2018 | Changwon | South Korea; Im Hana; Jung Eunhea; Keun Jihyeon | India; Anjum Moudgil; Apurvi Chandela; Mehuli Ghosh | Germany; Isabella Straub; Selina Gschwandtner; Julia Anita Simon |
| 2022 | Cairo | China; Huang Yuting; Wang Zhilin; Zhang Yu | United States; Sagen Maddalena; Mary Carolynn Tucker; Alison Marie Weisz | India; Mehuli Ghosh; Meghana Sajjanar; Elavenil Valarivan |

== World Championships, Mixed Team ==
| Year | Place | Gold | Silver | Bronze |
|---|---|---|---|---|
| 2018 | (South Korea) Changwon | China; Zhao Ruozhu; Yang Haoran | China; Wu Mingyang; Song Buhan | Russia; Anastasiia Galashina; Vladimir Maslennikov |

== World Championships, total medals ==
| Rank | Nation | Gold | Silver | Bronze | Total |
|---|---|---|---|---|---|
| 1 | West Germany | 14 | 6 | 9 | 29 |
| 2 | China | 10 | 13 | 3 | 26 |
| 3 | United States | 8 | 13 | 5 | 26 |
| 4 | Soviet Union | 7 | 12 | 10 | 29 |
| 5 | France | 7 | 2 | 0 | 9 |
| 6 | Germany | 7 | 0 | 6 | 13 |
| 7 | Bulgaria | 6 | 0 | 3 | 9 |
| 8 | Russia | 4 | 6 | 4 | 14 |
| 9 | Hungary | 3 | 4 | 3 | 10 |
| 10 | Norway | 3 | 2 | 4 | 9 |
| 11 | India | 3 | 2 | 2 | 7 |
| 12 | East Germany | 3 | 1 | 6 | 10 |
| 13 | Switzerland | 2 | 6 | 0 | 8 |
| 14 | South Korea | 2 | 4 | 10 | 16 |
| 15 | Italy | 2 | 1 | 3 | 6 |
| 16 | Yugoslavia | 1 | 4 | 0 | 5 |
| 17 | Poland | 1 | 3 | 2 | 6 |
| 18 | Czech Republic | 1 | 2 | 0 | 3 |
| 19 | Belarus | 1 | 1 | 2 | 4 |
| 20 | Finland | 1 | 0 | 0 | 1 |
| 20 | Israel | 1 | 0 | 0 | 1 |
| 22 | Great Britain | 0 | 1 | 3 | 4 |
| 23 | Austria | 0 | 1 | 2 | 3 |
| 24 | Croatia | 0 | 1 | 1 | 2 |
| 24 | Slovakia | 0 | 1 | 1 | 2 |
| 26 | Romania | 0 | 1 | 0 | 1 |
| 27 | Serbia | 0 | 0 | 2 | 2 |
| 28 | Japan | 0 | 0 | 1 | 1 |
| 28 | Kazakhstan | 0 | 0 | 1 | 1 |
| 28 | Netherlands | 0 | 0 | 1 | 1 |
| 28 | Spain | 0 | 0 | 1 | 1 |
| 28 | Sweden | 0 | 0 | 1 | 1 |
| 28 | Ukraine | 0 | 0 | 1 | 1 |
| Totals (33 entries) | | 87 | 87 | 87 | 261 |

== Current world records ==
Pre 2013 world records in 10 metre air rifle
| Men | Qualification | 600 | Tevarit Majchacheep (THA); Denis Sokolov (RUS); Gagan Narang (IND); Gagan Narang (IND); Zhu Qinan (CHN) | January 27, 2000; March 1, 2008; May 5, 2008; May 16, 2008; September 22, 2011 | Langkawi (MAS); Winterthur (SUI); Bangkok (THA); New Delhi (IND); Wrocław (POL) |
| Men | Final | 703.8 | Zhu Qinan (CHN) (600+103.8) | September 22, 2011 | Wrocław (POL) |
| Men | Teams | 1792 | China (Zhu, Wang, Liu) | January 13, 2012 | Doha (QAT) |
| Junior Men | Individual | 599 | Cheon Min-ho (KOR); Zhu Qinan (CHN); Zhu Qinan (CHN); Sergey Richter (ISR) | April 24, 2004; August 16, 2004; October 30, 2004; May 16, 2009 | Athens (GRE); Athens (GRE); Bangkok (THA); Munich (GER) |
| Junior Men | Teams | 1774 | Slovakia (Baláž, Homola, Jancek) | March 26, 2004 | Győr (HUN) |
| Women | Qualification | 400 | Seo Sun-hwa (KOR); Gao Jing (CHN); Lioubov Galkina (RUS); Du Li (CHN); Lioubov Galkina (RUS); Suma Shirur (IND); Lioubov Galkina (RUS); Monika Haselsberger (AUT); Barbara Lechner (GER); Zhao Yinghui (CHN); Wu Liuxi (CHN); Du Li (CHN); Sonja Pfeilschifter (GER); Kateřina Emmons (CZE); Lioubov Galkina (RUS); Yi Siling (CHN) | 12 April 2002; 22 April 2002; 24 August 2002; 4 June 2003; 14 June 2003; 13 February 2004; 22 February 2004; 22 April 2004; 5 March 2005; 11 April 2005; 11 June 2005; 4 October 2006; 24 May 2008; 9 August 2008; 5 November 2008; 1 August 2010 | Sydney (AUS); Shanghai (CHN); Munich (GER); Zagreb (CRO); Munich (GER); Kuala Lumpur (MAS); Bangkok (THA); Athens (GRE); Tallinn (EST); Changwon (KOR); Munich (GER); Granada (ESP); Milan (ITA); Beijing (CHN); Bangkok (THA); Munich (GER) |
| Women | Final | 505.6 | Yi Siling (CHN) (400+105.6) | 1 August 2010 | Munich (GER) |
| Women | Teams | 1196 | China (Du, Wu, Zhao) | December 6, 2007 | Kuwait City (KUW) |
| Junior Women | Individual | 400 | Seo Sun-hwa (KOR); Zhang Yi (CHN) | April 12, 2002; December 6, 2007 | Sydney (AUS); Kuwait City (KUW) |
| Junior Women | Teams | 1188 | South Korea (Choi, Kim, Seo) | July 8, 2002 | Lahti (FIN) |

=== Post 1 January 2013 World and Olympic Records ===
Post 1 January 2013 world records in 10 metre air rifle
| Men | Qualification | 633.5 | Péter Sidi (HUN) | May 25, 2013 | Munich (GER) |
| Men | Final | 210.6 | Xuechao Qian (CHN) | May 21, 2016 | Munich (GER) |
| Women | Qualification | 422.9 | Chen Dongqi (CHN) | May 28, 2015 | Munich (GER) |
| Women | Final | 211.0 | Yi Siling (CHN) | July 3, 2014 | Beijing (CHN) |

Post 1 January 2013 Olympic records in 10 metre air rifle
| Men | Qualification | 630.2 | Niccolò Campriani (ITA) | August 8, 2016 | Rio de Janeiro (BRA) |
| Men | Final | 206.1 | Niccolò Campriani (ITA) | August 8, 2016 | Rio de Janeiro (BRA) |
| Women | Qualification | 420.7 | Du Li (CHN) | August 6, 2016 | Rio de Janeiro (BRA) |
| Women | Final | 208.0 | Virginia Thrasher (USA) | August 6, 2016 | Rio de Janeiro (BRA) |

=== Post 1 January 2018 World and Olympic Records ===
Current world records in 10 metre air rifle
| Men | Qualification | 637.9 | Sheng Lihao (CHN) | May 12, 2023 | Baku (AZE) |
| Men | Final | 255.0 | Danilo Sollazzo (ITA) | September 11, 2025 | Ningbo (CHN) |
| Men | Teams | 1893.7 | India (Patil, Tomar, Panwar) | September 25, 2023 | Hangzhou (CHN) |
| Junior Men | Qualification | 637.9 | Sheng Lihao (CHN) | May 12, 2023 | Baku (AZE) |
| Junior Men | Final | 254.5 | Sheng Lihao (CHN) | June 3, 2024 | Munich (GER) |
| Junior Men | Teams | 1886.9 | India (Dhanush, Makhija, Rajpreet Singh) | October 2, 2021 | Lima (PER) |
| Women | Qualification | 637.9 | Wang Zifei (CHN) | June 10, 2025 | Munich (GER) |
| Women | Final | 254.8 | Wang Zifei (CHN) | April 19, 2025 | Lima (PER) |
| Women | Teams | 1898.4 | USA (Weisz, Maddalena, Tucker) | November 9, 2022 | Lima (PER) |
| Junior Women | Qualification | 637.9 | Wang Zifei (CHN) | June 10, 2025 | Munich (GER) |
| Junior Women | Final | 254.8 | Wang Zifei (CHN) | April 19, 2025 | Lima (PER) |
| Junior Women | Teams | 1892.0 | China (Wang, Fan, Zhang) | July 18, 2023 | Changwon (KOR) |
| Mixed Team | Qualification | 635.9 | Wang Zifei (CHN); Sheng Lihao (CHN) | June 14, 2025 | Munich (GER) |
| Junior Mixed Team | Qualification | 635.9 | Wang Zifei (CHN); Sheng Lihao (CHN) | June 14, 2025 | Munich (GER) |

Current Olympic records in 10 metre air rifle
| Men | Qualification | 632.7 | Yang Haoran (CHN) | July 25, 2021 | Tokyo (JPN) |
| Men | Final | 251.6 | William Shaner (USA) | July 25, 2021 | Tokyo (JPN) |
| Women | Qualification | 632.9 | Jeanette Hegg Duestad (NOR) | July 24, 2021 | Tokyo (JPN) |
| Women | Final | 251.8 | Yang Qian (CHN) | July 24, 2021 | Tokyo (JPN) |
