= List of medalists at the European Shooting Championships =

List of medalists at the European Shooting Championships

== Men ==
=== 10 m air pistol ===
Event	Gold	Silver	Bronze
1969 Plzeň	Heinz Mertel (FRG)	Yevgeny Rasskazov (URS)	Jiří Hrneček (TCH)
1971 Mezibori	Vladimir Stolypin (URS)	Grigory Kosykh (URS)	Kjell Jacobsson (SWE)
1972 Belgrade	Dan Iuga (RUM)	Ernst Mueller (FRG)	Józef Zapędzki (POL)
1973 Linz	Grigory Kosykh (URS)	Vladimir Stolypin (URS)	Anatoly Egrishchin (URS)
1974 Enschede	Paweł Małek (POL)	Matti Patteri (FIN)	Heinrich Fretwurst (FRG)
1975 London	Anatoly Egrishchin (URS)	Grigory Kosykh (URS)	Hubert Garschall (AUT)
1976 Paris	Harald Vollmar (GDR)	Vincenzo Tondo (ITA)	Hynek Hromada (TCH)
1977 Andorra la Vella	Harald Vollmar (GDR)	Rudolf Dollinger (AUT)	Viktor Petrov (URS)
1978 Copenhagen	Sławomir Romanowski (POL)	Geoffrey Robinson (GBR)	Vincenzo Tondo (ITA)
1979 Graz	Uwe Potteck (GDR)	Seppo Saarenpää (FIN)	Roman Burkhard (SUI)
1980 Oslo	Sergei Sumatokhin (URS)	Alexander Melentyev (URS)	Uwe Potteck (GDR)
1981 Athens	Vladas Turla (URS)	Ivan Mandov (BUL)	Vincenzo Tondo (ITA)
1982 Den Haag	Vladas Turla (URS)	Uwe Potteck (GDR)	Sergei Sumatokhin (URS)
1983 Dortmund	Anatoly Egrishchin (URS)	Ljubtcho Diakov (BUL)	Philippe Cola (FRA)
1984 Budapest	Vincenzo Tondo (ITA)	Alexander Melentyev (URS)	Anatoly Egrishchin (URS)
1985 Varna	Klaus Adamek (FRG)	Vincenzo Tondo (ITA)	Laszlo Nemeth (HUN)
1986 Espoo	Boris Kokorev (URS)	Uwe Potteck (GDR)	Gernot Eder (GDR)
1987 Bratislava	Ihar Basinski (URS)	Sergei Pyzhianov (URS)	Pierre Brémond (FRA)
1988 Stavanger	Ihar Basinski (URS)	Ragnar Skanåker (SWE)	Gernot Eder (GDR)
1989 Copenhagen	Sorin Babii (RUM)	Ihar Basinski (URS)	Sergei Pyzhianov (URS)
1990 Arnhem	Jerzy Pietrzak (POL)	Boris Kokorev (URS)	Sorin Babii (RUM)
1991 Manchester	Sergei Pyzhianov (URS)	Uwe Potteck (GER)	Boris Kokorev (URS)
1992 Budapest	Boris Kokorev (EUN)	Sorin Babii (RUM)	Uwe Potteck (GER)
1993 Brno	Boris Kokorev (RUS)	Jerzy Pietrzak (POL)	Roberto Di Donna (ITA)
1994 Strasbourg	Viktor Makarov (UKR)	Hans-Jürgen Bauer-Neumaier (GER)	Marek Nowak (POL)
1995 Vantaa	Uwe Potteck (GER)	Roberto Di Donna (ITA)	Tanyu Kiryakov (BUL)
1996 Budapest	Hans-Jürgen Bauer-Neumaier (GER)	Mikhail Nestruyev (RUS)	Kanstantsin Lukashyk (BLR)
1997 Warsaw	Mikhail Nestruyev (RUS)	Roberto Di Donna (ITA)	Sorin Babii (RUM)
1998 Tallinn	Tanyu Kiryakov (BUL)	Mikhail Nestruyev (RUS)	Sergei Pyzhianov (RUS)
1999 Arnhem	Roberto Di Donna (ITA)	Tanyu Kiryakov (BUL)	Sorin Babii (RUM)
2000 Munich	Alexander Danilov (ISR)	Hans-Jürgen Bauer-Neumaier (GER)	Roberto Di Donna (ITA)
2001 Pontevedra	Roberto Di Donna (ITA)	Ihar Basinski (BLR)	Martin Tenk (CZE)
2002 Thessaloniki	Mikhail Nestruyev (RUS)	Franck Dumoulin (FRA)	Zsolt Karacs (HUN)
2003 Gothenburg	Mikhail Nestruyev (RUS)	Yury Dauhapolau (BLR)	Viktor Makarov (UKR)
2004 Győr	Mikhail Nestruyev (RUS)	Tanyu Kiryakov (BUL)	Francesco Bruno (ITA)
2005 Tallinn	Walter Lapeyre (FRA)	Norayr Bakhtamyan (ARM)	Franck Dumoulin (FRA)
2006 Moscow	Tanyu Kiryakov (BUL)	Norayr Bakhtamyan (ARM)	Walter Lapeyre (FRA)
2007 Deauville	Leonid Ekimov (RUS)	Mikhail Nestruyev (RUS)	Vladimir Isakov (RUS)
2008 Winterthur	Leonid Ekimov (RUS)	Walter Lapeyre (FRA)	Tanyu Kiryakov (BUL)
2009 Prague	Andrija Zlatić (SRB)	Mauro Badaracchi (ITA)	Yury Dauhapolau (BLR)
2010 Meraker	Mauro Badaracchi (ITA)	Serhiy Kudriya (UKR)	Juraj Tužinský (SVK)
2011 Brescia	Franck Dumoulin (FRA)	Andrija Zlatić (SRB)	Oleh Omelchuk (UKR)
2012 Vierumäki	Pablo Carrera (ESP)	Yusuf Dikeç (TUR)	Leonid Ekimov (RUS)
2013 Odense	Leonid Ekimov (RUS)	Anton Gourianov (RUS)	Pablo Carrera (ESP)
2014 Moscow	Oleh Omelchuk (UKR)	Vitali Kudzi (BLR)	Anton Gourianov (RUS)
2015 Arnhem	Philipp Grimm (GER)	Damir Mikec (SRB)	Anton Gourianov (RUS)
2016 Győr	Yusuf Dikeç (TUR)	Pablo Carrera (ESP)	Pavlo Korostylov (UKR)
2017 Maribor	Christian Reitz (GER)	Damir Mikec (SRB)	İsmail Keleş (TUR)
2018 Győr	Yusuf Dikeç (TUR)	Artem Chernousov (RUS)	João Costa (POR)
2019 Osijek	Pavlo Korostylov (UKR)	Damir Mikec (SRB)	Giuseppe Giordano (ITA)
2020 Wrocław	Artem Chernousov (RUS)	Paolo Monna (ITA)	İsmail Keleş (TUR)
2021 Osijek	Juraj Tužinský (SVK)	Vadim Mukhametyanov (RUS)	Robin Walter (GER)
2022 Hamar	Robin Walter (GER)	Juraj Tužinský (SVK)	Miklós Tátrai (HUN)
2023 Tallinn	Damir Mikec (SRB)	Ruslan Lunev (AZE)	Paolo Monna (ITA)
2024 Győr	Paolo Monna (ITA)	Juraj Tužinský (SVK)	Robin Walter (GER)
2025 Osijek	Juraj Tužinský (SVK)	Pavel Schejbal (CZE)	Jason Solari (SUI)
2026 Yerevan	Anton Aristarkhov	Robin Walter (GER)	Jason Solari (SUI)

=== 50 m pistol ===
Event	Gold	Silver	Bronze
1955 Bucharest	Anton Jasinsky (URS)	Lev Vainshtein (URS)	Konstantin Martazov (URS)
1959 Milan	Makhmud Umarov (URS)	Alexei Gustchin (URS)	Karel Mucha (TCH)
1963 Stockholm	Vladimir Stolypin (URS)	Grigory Kosykh (URS)	Mihail Akulov (URS)
1965 Bucharest	Grigory Kosykh (URS)	Evgeni Raskazov (URS)	Dentcho Todorov Denev (BUL)
1969 Plzeň	Grigory Kosykh (URS)	Harald Vollmar (GDR)	Hubert Garschall (AUT)
1971 Suhl	Boris Yermakov (URS)	Harald Vollmar (GDR)	Grigory Kosykh (URS)
1975 Madrid	Harald Vollmar (GDR)	Jean Faggion (FRA)	Hynek Hromada (TCH)
1977 Bucharest	Ove Gunnarsson (SWE)	Klaus Windisch (GDR)	Harald Vollmar (GDR)
1979 Lvov	Paavo Palokangas (FIN)	Harald Vollmar (GDR)	Uwe Potteck (GDR)
1981 Titograd	Alexander Melentyev (URS)	Sergei Sumatokhin (URS)	Gyula Karácsonyi (HUN)
1983 Bucharest	Philippe Cola (FRA)	Ragnar Skanåker (SWE)	Alexander Melentyev (URS)
1985 Osijek	Liviu Stan (ITA)	Sorin Babii (RUM)	Uwe Potteck (GDR)
1987 Lahti	Dario Palazzani (ITA)	Sorin Babii (RUM)	Sergei Pyzhianov (URS)
1989 Zagreb	Ragnar Skanåker (SWE)	Zoltán Papanitz (HUN)	Sergei Pyzhianov (URS)
1991 Bologna	Alexander Melentyev (URS)	Ragnar Skanåker (SWE)	Jerzy Pietrzak (POL)
1993 Brno	Boris Kokorev (RUS)	Roberto Di Donna (ITA)	Ragnar Skanåker (SWE)
1995 Zurich	Sorin Babii (RUM)	Alexander Danilov (RUS)	Roberto Di Donna (ITA)
1997 Kouvola	Boris Kokorev (RUS)	Zoltán Papanitz (HUN)	Uwe Potteck (GER)
1999 Bordeaux	Martin Tenk (CZE)	Tanyu Kiryakov (BUL)	Ihar Basinski (BLR)
2001 Zagreb	Mikhail Nestruyev (RUS)	Vladimir Gontcharov (RUS)	Martin Tenk (CZE)
2003 Plzeň	Viktor Makarov (UKR)	Tanyu Kiryakov (BUL)	João Costa (POR)
2005 Belgrade	Boris Kokorev (RUS)	Francesco Bruno (ITA)	Tanyu Kiryakov (BUL)
2007 Granada	Tanyu Kiryakov (BUL)	Vladimir Gontcharov (RUS)	Francesco Bruno (ITA)
2009 Prague	João Costa (POR)	Hans-Jörg Meyer (GER)	Norayr Bakhtamyan (ARM)
2011 Belgrade	Andrija Zlatić (SRB)	Leonid Ekimov (RUS)	João Costa (POR)
2013 Osijek	Giuseppe Giordano (ITA)	João Costa (POR)	Denis Kulakov (RUS)
2015 Maribor	João Costa (POR)	Francesco Bruno (ITA)	Sergey Chervyakovskiy (RUS)
2017 Baku	Pavlo Korostylov (UKR)	Damir Mikec (SRB)	Lauris Strautmanis (LAT)
2019 Bologna	Samuil Donkov (BUL)	Mikhail Isakov (RUS)	Viktor Bankin (UKR)

=== 10 m air rifle ===
Event	Gold	Silver	Bronze
1969 Plzeň	Petre Șandor (RUM)	Magne Landro (NOR)	Martin Truttmann (SUI)
1971 Mezibori	Vladislav Raskovalov (URS)	Vitaly Parkhimovich (URS)	Gottfried Kustermann (FRG)
1972 Belgrade	Boris Melnik (URS)	Petr Kovářík (TCH)	Gyorgy Abonyi (HUN)
1973 Linz	Sergei Rainikov (URS)	Gottfried Kustermann (FRG)	Gyorgy Abonyi (HUN)
1974 Enschede	Romuald Siemionow (POL)	Gottfried Kustermann (FRG)	Max Huerzeler (SUI)
1975 London	Patrice de Mullenheim (FRA)	Andrzej Trajda (POL)	Gilbert Emptaz (FRA)
1976 Paris	Sergei Rainikov (URS)	Gennadi Lushikov (URS)	Faust Steinbrueck (GDR)
1977 Andorra la Vella	Faust Steinbrueck (GDR)	Ilie Codreanu (RUM)	Leif Nilsson (SWE)
1978 Copenhagen	Oswald Schlipf (FRG)	Srećko Pejović (YUG)	Werner Seibold (FRG)
1979 Graz	Malcolm Cooper (GBR)	Walter Hillenbrand (FRG)	Oswald Schlipf (FRG)
1980 Oslo	Alexander Mitrofanov (URS)	Malcolm Cooper (GBR)	Gerhard Krimbacher (AUT)
1981 Athens	Harald Stenvaag (NOR)	Gerhard Krimbacher (AUT)	Per Erik Løkken (NOR)
1982 Den Haag	Harald Stenvaag (NOR)	Pierre-Alain Dufaux (FRA)	Andreas Wolfram (GDR)
1983 Dortmund	Bernhard Suess (FRG)	Pierre-Alain Dufaux (FRA)	Viktor Vlasov (URS)
1984 Budapest	Juri Zavolodko (URS)	Philippe Heberlé (FRA)	Harald Stenvaag (NOR)
1985 Varna	Ralf Westerlund (FIN)	Dominique Maquin (FRA)	Andreas Kronthaler (AUT)
1986 Espoo	Jean-Michel Weber (FRA)	Jean-Pierre Amat (FRA)	Bernhard Suess (FRG)
1987 Bratislava	Nicolas Berthelot (FRA)	Kirill Ivanov (USSR)	Rajmond Debevec (YUG)
1988 Stavanger	Hrachya Petikyan (USSR)	Nicolas Berthelot (FRA)	Matthias Stich (FRG)
1989 Copenhagen	Viatcheslav Botchkarev (USSR)	Franck Badiou (FRA)	Yuri Fedkin (USSR)
1990 Arnhem	Jean-Pierre Amat (FRA)	Yuri Fedkin (USSR)	Rajmond Debevec (YUG)
1991 Manchester	Jean-Pierre Amat (FRA)	Yuri Fedkin (USSR)	Alexander Zlydenni (USSR)
1992 Budapest	Goran Maksimović (YUG)	Yuri Fedkin (EUN)	Petr Kůrka (TCH)
1993 Brno	Franck Badiou (FRA)	Alexander Zlydenni (RUS)	Rajmond Debevec (SLO)
1994 Strasbourg	Rajmond Debevec (SLO)	Torsten Krebs (GER)	Oleg Mikhailov (UKR)
1995 Vantaa	Torsten Krebs (GER)	Petr Kůrka (CZE)	Alexander Zlydenni (RUS)
1996 Budapest	Wolfram Waibel Jr. (AUT)	Gabriele Posillipo (ITA)	Jozef Gönci (SVK)
1997 Warsaw	Artem Khadjibekov (RUS)	Rajmond Debevec (SLO)	Sergei Kovalenko (RUS)
1998 Tallinn	Rajmond Debevec (SLO)	Artem Khadjibekov (RUS)	Georgi Nekhaev (BLR)
1999 Arnhem	Jozef Gönci (SVK)	Christian Bauer (GER)	Jean-Pierre Amat (FRA)
2000 Munich	Jean-Pierre Amat (FRA)	Dick Boschman (NED)	Péter Sidi (HUN)
2001 Pontevedra	Dick Boschman (NED)	Péter Sidi (HUN)	Eugeni Aleinikov (RUS)
2002 Thessaloniki	Péter Sidi (HUN)	Leif Rolland (NOR)	Rajmond Debevec (SLO)
2003 Gothenburg	Jozef Gönci (SVK)	Konstantin Prikhodtchenko (RUS)	Rajmond Debevec (SLO)
2004 Győr	Péter Sidi (HUN)	Dick Boschman (NED)	Alin Moldoveanu (ROM)
2005 Tallinn	Zoltan Balaz (SVK)	Are Hansen (NOR)	Jozef Gönci (SVK)
2006 Moscow	Mario Knögler (AUT)	Sergei Kruglov (RUS)	Artem Khadjibekov (RUS)
2007 Deauville	Konstantin Prikhodtchenko (RUS)	Henri Häkkinen (FIN)	Rajmond Debevec (SLO)
2008 Winterthur	Are Hansen (NOR)	Sergei Kruglov (RUS)	Jozef Gönci (SVK)
2009 Prague	Niccolò Campriani (ITA)	Pierre Edmond Piasecki (FRA)	Vitali Bubnovich (BLR)
2010 Meraker	Sergei Kruglov (RUS)	Péter Sidi (HUN)	Denis Sokolov (RUS)
2011 Brescia	Péter Sidi (HUN)	Alexandre Sokolov (RUS)	Niccolò Campriani (ITA)
2012 Vierumäki	Denis Sokolov (RUS)	Niccolò Campriani (ITA)	Marco De Nicolo (ITA)
2013 Odense	Sergy Rikhter (ISR)	Vitali Bubnovich (BLR)	Juho Kurki (FIN)
2014 Moscow	Oleh Tsarkov (UKR)	Vitali Bubnovich (BLR)	Nazar Luginets (RUS)
2015 Arnhem	Anton Rizov (BUL)	Niccolò Campriani (ITA)	Illia Charheika (BLR)
2016 Győr	Sergey Kamenskiy (RUS)	Illia Charheika (BLR)	Petar Gorša (CRO)
2017 Maribor	Vladimir Maslennikov (RUS)	Oleh Tsarkov (UKR)	Alexis Raynaud (FRA)
2018 Győr	Vladimir Maslennikov (RUS)	Alexander Dryagin (RUS)	Petar Gorša (CRO)
2019 Osijek	Vladimir Maslennikov (RUS)	Brian Baudouin (FRA)	Yevgueni Panchenko (RUS)
2020 Wrocław	István Péni (HUN)	Oleh Tsarkov (UKR)	Sergy Rikhter (ISR)
2021 Osijek	István Péni (HUN)	Sergy Rikhter (ISR)	Vladimir Maslennikov (RUS)
2022 Hamar	Patrik Jány (SVK)	Henrik Larsen (NOR)	Miran Maričić (CRO)
2023 Tallinn	Maximilian Ulbrich (GER)	Patrik Jány (SVK)	Alexander Schmirl (AUT)
2024 Győr	Patrik Jány (SVK)	István Péni (HUN)	Martin Strempfl (AUT)
2025 Osijek	Serhiy Kulish (UKR)	Ilia Marsov	Miran Maričić (CRO)
2026 Yerevan	Danilo Sollazzo (ITA)	Victor Lindgren (SWE)	Ole Martin Halvorsen (NOR)

=== 50 m rifle three positions ===
Event	Gold	Silver	Bronze
1955 Bucharest	Ole Hviid Jensen (DEN)	Moysey Itkis (URS)	Vasily Borisov (URS)
1959 Milano	Klaus Zähringer (FRG)	Moysey Itkis (URS)	Marat Niyazov (URS)
1963 Oslo	Bernd Klingner (FRG)	Klaus Zähringer (FRG)	Jan Emil Poignant (SWE)
1965 Bucharest	Alexander Gerasimenok (URS)	Vitaly Parkhimovich (URS)	Vladimir Chuian (URS)
1969 Plzeň	Oleg Lapkin (URS)	Vitaly Parkhimovich (URS)	Franco Donna (ITA)
1971 Suhl	Vitaly Parkhimovich (URS)	Gottfried Kustermann (FRG)	Vladimir Agishev (URS)
1975 Bucharest	Alexander Mitrofanov (URS)	Eugeniusz Pędzisz (POL)	Ștefan Kaban (RUM)
1977 Bucharest	Ulrich Lind (FRG)	Malcolm Cooper (GBR)	Gennadi Lushikov (URS)
1979 Lvov	Nonka Matova (BUL)	Bernd Hartstein (GDR)	Mario Gonsierowski (GDR)
1981 Titograd	Alister Allan (GBR)	Viktor Vlasov (URS)	Harald Stenvaag (NOR)
1983 Bucharest	Vladimir Lvov (URS)	Viktor Vlasov (URS)	Alexander Mitrofanov (URS)
1985 Osijek	Kirill Ivanov (URS)	Pavel Soukeník (TCH)	Hrachya Petikyan (URS)
1987 Lahti	Attila Záhonyi (HUN)	Petr Kůrka (TCH)	Kirill Ivanov (URS)
1989 Zagreb	Milan Bakeš (TCH)	Viatcheslav Botchkarev (URS)	Rajmond Debevec (YUG)
1991 Bologna	Goran Maksimović (YUG)	Nemanja Mirosavljev (YUG)	Harald Stenvaag (NOR)
1993 Brno	Anatoli Klimenko (BLR)	Hrachya Petikyan (ARM)	Yuri Fedkin (RUS)
1995 Zurich	Artem Khadjibekov (RUS)	Jean-Pierre Amat (FRA)	Anatoli Klimenko (BLR)
1997 Kouvola	Sergei Martynov (BLR)	Jozef Gönci (SVK)	Dieter Grabner (AUT)
1999 Bordeaux	Jozef Gönci (SVK)	Sergei Martynov (BLR)	Artur Ayvazyan (UKR)
2001 Zagreb	Artur Ayvazyan (UKR)	Artem Khadjibekov (RUS)	Jozef Gönci (SVK)
2003 Plzeň	Rajmond Debevec (SLO)	Konstantin Prikhodtchenko (RUS)	Sergei Martynov (BLR)
2005 Belgrade	Sergei Kovalenko (RUS)	Jozef Gönci (SVK)	Rajmond Debevec (SLO)
2007 Granada	Jozef Gönci (SVK)	Artem Khadjibekov (RUS)	Nemanja Mirosavljev (SRB)
2009 Osijek	Péter Sidi (HUN)	Thomas Farnik (AUT)	Julian Justus (GER)
2011 Belgrade	Péter Sidi (HUN)	Marco De Nicolo (ITA)	Anton Rizov (BUL)
2013 Osijek	Nazar Louginets (RUS)	Valérian Sauveplane (FRA)	Vitali Bubnovich (BLR)
2015 Maribor	Sergey Kamenskiy (RUS)	Alexis Raynaud (FRA)	Daniel Brodmeier (GER)
2017 Baku	Yury Shcherbatsevich (BLR)	Serhiy Kulish (UKR)	Alexander Schmirl (AUT)
2019 Bologna	Petr Nymbursky (CZE)	Filip Nepejchal (CZE)	Jon-Hermann Hegg (NOR)

== Women ==
=== 10 m air pistol ===
Event	Gold	Silver	Bronze
1969 Versailles	Nina Stoliarova (URS)	Ann-Maj Tara (FIN)	Ruth Kasten (FRG)
1971 Mezibori	Klotylda Tesařová (TCH)	Anisoara Matei (RUM)	Nadezhda Ibragimova (URS)
1972 Belgrade	Nina Stoliarova (URS)	Inna Ivanova (URS)	Anisoara Matei (RUM)
1973 Linz	Zinaida Simonian (URS)	Nina Stoliarova (URS)	Nadezhda Ibragimova (URS)
1974 Enschede	Nina Stoliarova (URS)	Galina Zharikova (URS)	Galina Dmitrieva (URS)
1975 London	Galina Zharikova (URS)	Nina Stoliarova (URS)	Zinaida Simonian (URS)
1976 Paris	Zinaida Simonian (URS)	Galina Korzun (URS)	Nina Stoliarova (URS)
1977 Andorra la Vella	Galina Korzun (URS)	Evelyne Manchon (FRA)	Zinaida Simonian (URS)
1978 Copenhagen	Galina Korzun (URS)	Zinaida Simonian (URS)	Nonna Kalinina (URS)
1979 Graz	Zinaida Simonian (URS)	Helga Buechner (SWE)	Christine Strahalm (AUT)
1980 Oslo	Kyllikki Sysilae (FIN)	Galina Korzun (URS)	Gun Naesman (SWE)
1981 Athens	Kerstin Bodin (SWE)	Kyllikki Sysilae (FIN)	Nonna Kalinina (URS)
1982 Den Haag	Marina Dobrancheva (URS)	Nonna Kalinina (URS)	Kerstin Bodin (SWE)
1983 Dortmund	Svetlana Veresova (URS)	Marina Dobrancheva (URS)	Maria Piovesan (ITA)
1984 Budapest	Marina Dobrancheva (URS)	Silvia Kaposztai (RUM)	Marta Kotroczo (HUN)
1985 Varna	Marina Dobrancheva (URS)	Inna Rose (URS)	Silvia Kaposztai (RUM)
1986 Espoo	Jasna Brajković (YUG)	Marina Dobrancheva (URS)	Anke Voelker (GDR)
1987 Bratislava	Lalita Tsvetkova (URS)	Anne Goffin (BEL)	Marina Dobrancheva (URS)
1988 Stavanger	Lieselotte Breker (FRG)	Marina Dobrancheva (URS)	Svetlana Smirnova (URS)
1989 Copenhagen	Svetlana Smirnova (URS)	Jasna Šekarić (YUG)	Eszter Poljak (YUG)
1990 Arnhem	Nino Salukvadze (URS)	Jasna Šekarić (YUG)	Lieselotte Breker (FRG)
1991 Manchester	Jasna Šekarić (YUG)	Svetlana Smirnova (URS)	Nino Salukvadze (URS)
1992 Budapest	Jasna Šekarić (YUG)	Maria Grozdeva (BUL)	Margit Stein (GER)
1993 Brno	Svetlana Smirnova (RUS)	Marina Logvinenko (RUS)	Karen Hansen (DEN)
1994 Strasbourg	Maria Grozdeva (BUL)	Diana Iorgova (BUL)	Jasna Šekarić (FR Yugoslavia)
1995 Vantaa	Maria Grozdeva (BUL)	Olga Klochneva (RUS)	Svetlana Smirnova (RUS)
1996 Budapest	Jasna Šekarić (FR Yugoslavia)	Olga Klochneva (RUS)	Nino Salukvadze (GEO)
1997 Warsaw	Olga Kuznetsova (RUS)	Svetlana Smirnova (RUS)	Mirosława Sagun (POL)
1998 Tallinn	Mirosława Sagun (POL)	Yuliya Siniak (BLR)	Susanne Meyerhoff (DEN)
1999 Arnhem	Susanne Meyerhoff (DEN)	Marina Logvinenko (RUS)	Jasna Šekarić (FR Yugoslavia)
2000 Munich	Svetlana Smirnova (RUS)	Maria Grozdeva (BUL)	Katarzyna Klepacz (POL)
2001 Pontevedra	Natalia Akhmertdinova (RUS)	Olga Kuznetsova (RUS)	Nino Salukvadze (GEO)
2002 Thessaloniki	Susanne Meyerhoff Meltz (DEN)	Mirela Skoko-Ćelić (CRO)	Olga Kuznetsova (RUS)
2003 Gothenburg	Susanne Meyerhoff Meltz (DEN)	Olena Kostevych (UKR)	Natalia Akhmertdinova (RUS)
2004 Győr	Natalia Akhmertdinova (RUS)	Olena Kostevych (UKR)	Susanne Meyerhoff (DEN)
2005 Tallinn	Svetlana Smirnova (RUS)	Nino Salukvadze (GEO)	Olga Kuznetsova (RUS)
2006 Moscow	Susanne Meyerhoff (DEN)	Natalia Paderina (RUS)	Beata Bartków-Kwiatkowska (POL)
2007 Deauville	Claudia Verdicchio-Krause (GER)	Mira Nevansuu (FIN)	Sonia Franquet (ESP)
2008 Winterthur	Viktoria Chaika (BLR)	Nino Salukvadze (GEO)	Natalia Paderina (RUS)
2009 Prague	Maria Grozdeva (BUL)	Nino Salukvadze (GEO)	Lenka Marušková (CZE)
2010 Meraker	Bobana Veličković (SRB)	Zsófia Csonka (HUN)	Viktoria Chaika (BLR)
2011 Brescia	Céline Goberville (FRA)	Viktoria Chaika (BLR)	Olena Kostevych (UKR)
2012 Vierumäki	Bobana Veličković (SRB)	Olena Kostevych (UKR)	Liubov Yaskevich (RUS)
2013 Odense	Céline Goberville (FRA)	Marija Marović (CRO)	Viktoria Chaika (BLR)
2014 Moscow	Stefanie Thurmann (GER)	Monika Karsch (GER)	Viktoria Chaika (BLR)
2015 Arnhem	Olena Kostevych (UKR)	Antoaneta Boneva (BUL)	Renáta Tobai-Sike (HUN)
2016 Győr	Olena Kostevych (UKR)	Antoaneta Boneva (BUL)	Zorana Arunović (SRB)
2017 Maribor	Zorana Arunović (SRB)	Olena Kostevych (UKR)	Sonia Franquet (ESP)
2018 Győr	Céline Goberville (FRA)	Zorana Arunović (SRB)	Bobana Veličković Momčilović (SRB)
2019 Osijek	Klaudia Breś (POL)	Anna Korakaki (GRE)	Veronika Major (HUN)
2020 Wrocław	Bobana Veličković Momčilović (SRB)	Heidi Diethelm Gerber (SUI)	Anna Korakaki (GRE)
2021 Osijek	Carina Wimmer (GER)	Vitalina Batsarashkina (RUS)	Céline Goberville (FRA)
2022 Hamar	Olena Kostevych (UKR)	Zorana Arunović (SRB)	Sylvia Steiner (AUT)
2023 Tallinn	Anna Korakaki (GRE)	Camille Jedrzejewski (FRA)	Elmira Karapetyan (ARM)
2024 Győr	Anna Dulce (MDA)	Şimal Yılmaz (TUR)	Zorana Arunović (SRB)
2025 Osijek	Şevval İlayda Tarhan (TUR)	Zorana Arunović (SRB)	Miroslava Mincheva (BUL)
2026 Yerevan	Veronika Major (HUN)	Manja Slak (SVN)	Antoaneta Kostadinova (BUL)

=== 25 m pistol ===
Event	Gold	Silver	Bronze
1969 Versailles	Nina Stoliarova (URS)	Gisele Lecourtier (FRA)	Ingegärd Karlsson (SWE)
1971 Suhl	Larisa Niskova (URS)	Nina Stoliarova (URS)	Anisoara Matei (RUM)
1974 Vingsted	Nina Stoliarova (URS)	Zinaida Simonian (URS)	Irena Mazurkiewicz (POL)
1975 Sofia	Nina Stoliarova (URS)	Julita Kalasa (POL)	Nonna Kalinina (URS)
1976 Skopje	Anna Ciobanu (RUM)	Lamara Beidina (URS)	Aase Havsteen (DEN)
1977 Rome	Galina Korzun (URS)	Lamara Beidina (URS)	Elizabeta Karabolli (ALB)
1978 Hämeenlinna	Larisa Asrian (URS)	Elizabeta Karabolli (ALB)	Galina Korzun (URS)
1979 Frankfurt	Elizabeta Karabolli (ALB)	Galina Korzun (URS)	Zinaida Simonian (URS)
1980 Milano	Galina Korzun (URS)	Tatiana Turischeva (URS)	Erzsébet Pécsi (HUN)
1981 Titograd	Anna Ciobanu (RUM)	Inna Rose (URS)	Elena Gheoroaie (RUM)
1982 Rome	Marina Dobrancheva (URS)	Auksne Treinite (URS)	Márta Kotroczó (HUN)
1983 Bucharest	Maria Macovei (RUM)	Auksne Treinite (URS)	Brida Gachster (SUI)
1985 Osijek	Silvia Kaposztai (RUM)	Irina Kotcherova (URS)	Palma Balogh (HUN)
1987 Lahti	Irina Kotcherova (URS)	Marina Dobrancheva (URS)	Britt-Marie Ellis (SWE)
1989 Zagreb	Nino Salukvadze (URS)	Ágnes Ferencz (HUN)	Jasna Šekarić (YUG)
1991 Bologna	Corine Serra-Tosio (FRA)	Svetlana Smirnova (URS)	Marina Logvinenko (URS)
1993 Brno	Nino Salukvadze (GEO)	Maria Grozdeva (BUL)	Diana Iorgova (BUL)
1995 Zurich	Jana Kubala (AUT)	Maria Grozdeva (BUL)	Diana Iorgova (BUL)
1997 Kouvola	Maria Grozdeva (BUL)	Diana Iorgova (BUL)	Ágnes Ferencz (HUN)
1999 Bordeaux	Maria Grozdeva (BUL)	Nino Salukvadze (GEO)	Yauheniya Haluza (BLR)
2001 Zagreb	Michela Suppo (ITA)	Svetlana Smirnova (RUS)	Jasna Šekarić (FR Yugoslavia)
2003 Plzeň	Maria Grozdeva (BUL)	Munkhbayar Dorjsuren (GER)	Nino Salukvadze (GEO)
2005 Belgrade	Jasna Šekarić (SCG)	Maria Grozdeva (BUL)	Munkhbayar Dorjsuren (GER)
2007 Granada	Lindita Kodra (ALB)	Munkhbayar Dorjsuren (GER)	Maria Grozdeva (BUL)
2009 Osijek	Maria Grozdeva (BUL)	Lenka Marušková (CZE)	Sławomira Szpek (POL)
2011 Belgrade	Heidi Diethelm (SUI)	Kira Klimova (RUS)	Stéphanie Tirode (FRA)
2013 Osijek	Heidi Diethelm Gerber (SUI)	Munkhbayar Dorjsuren (GER)	Monika Karsch (GER)
2015 Maribor	Zsófia Csonka (HUN)	Viktoria Chaika (BLR)	Olena Kostevych (UKR)
2017 Baku	Monika Karsch (GER)	Klaudia Breś (POL)	Maria Grozdeva (BUL)
2019 Bologna	Monika Karsch (GER)	Veronika Major (HUN)	Mathilde Lamolle (FRA)

=== 10 m air rifle ===
Event	Gold	Silver	Bronze
1969 Versailles	Monika Riesterer (FRG)	Tamara Cherkasova (URS)	Lajosné Kisgyörgy (HUN)
1971 Mezibori	Edda Baia (RUM)	Tamara Cherkasova (URS)	Monika Riesterer (FRG)
1972 Belgrade	Monika Riesterer (FRG)	Tatiana Ratnikova (URS)	Baiba Zariņa (URS)
1973 Linz	Nadezhda Zybalova (URS)	Marga Nabel (GDR)	Kira Boiko (URS)
1974 Enschede	Baiba Zariņa (URS)	Elżbieta Kowalewska (POL)	Kira Boiko (URS)
1975 London	Nadezhda Zybalova (URS)	Baiba Zariņa (URS)	Irena Wierzbowska-Młotkowska (POL)
1976 Paris	Eva Olah (RUM)	Baiba Zariņa (URS)	Gertrud Futschek (FRG)
1977 Andorra la Vella	Elisabeth Balș (FRG)	Marlies Kanthak (GDR)	Tatiana Krylova (URS)
1978 Copenhagen	Tatiana Krylova (URS)	Elena Rybakova (URS)	Elisabeth Balș (FRG)
1979 Graz	Baiba Berklava (URS)	Nonka Matova (BUL)	Marlies Helbig (GDR)
1980 Oslo	Sarah Cooper (GBR)	Marlies Helbig (GDR)	Anka Pelova (BUL)
1981 Athens	Anne Grethe Jeppesen (NOR)	Marlies Helbig (GDR)	Anka Pelova (BUL)
1982 Den Haag	Anna Malakhova (URS)	Kathrin Starkloff (GDR)	Lászlóné Hunyadi (HUN)
1983 Dortmund	Lessia Leskiv (URS)	Svetlana Komaristova (URS)	Gisela Sailer (FRG)
1984 Budapest	Eva Forian (HUN)	Nonka Matova (BUL)	Sirpa Ylönen (FIN)
1985 Varna	Vesela Letcheva (BUL)	Nonka Matova (BUL)	Pirjo Peltola (FIN)
1986 Espoo	Anita Karlsson (SWE)	Marina Suslova (URS)	Irène Dufaux Suter (SUI)
1987 Bratislava	Vesela Letcheva (BUL)	Carmen Giese (FRG)	Irène Dufaux Suter (SUI)
1988 Stavanger	Éva Joó (HUN)	Anna Malukhina (URS)	Eva Forian (HUN)
1989 Copenhagen	Valentina Cherkasova (USSR)	Anna Malukhina (URS)	Éva Joó (HUN)
1990 Arnhem	Éva Joó (HUN)	Mirjana Horvat (YUG)	Nonka Matova (BUL)
1991 Manchester	Svitlana Seledkova (URS)	Valentina Cherkasova (USSR)	Hanne Vataker (NOR)
1992 Budapest	Anitza Valkova (BUL)	Valentina Cherkasova (EUN)	Renata Mauer (POL)
1993 Brno	Eva Forian (HUN)	Suzana Skoko (CRO)	Ivanka Beltheva (BUL)
1994 Strasbourg	Anna Malukhina (RUS)	Lidija Mihajlović (FR Yugoslavia)	Vesela Letcheva (BUL)
1995 Vantaa	Nonka Matova (BUL)	Marina Grigorieva (RUS)	Vesela Letcheva (BUL)
1996 Budapest	Iryna Shylava (BLR)	Petra Horneber (GER)	Aleksandra Ivošev (YUG)
1997 Warsaw	Gabriele Bühlmann (SUI)	Éva Joó (HUN)	Valérie Bellenoue (FRA)
1998 Tallinn	Olga Pogrebnyak (BLR)	Kirsten Schuller (GER)	Lyubov Galkina (RUS)
1999 Arnhem	Sonja Pfeilschifter (GER)	Lyubov Galkina (RUS)	Gabriele Bühlmann (SUI)
2000 Munich	Valérie Bellenoue (FRA)	Gabriele Bühlmann (SUI)	Petra Horneber (GER)
2001 Pontevedra	Sonja Pfeilschifter (GER)	Valérie Bellenoue (FRA)	Lyubov Galkina (RUS)
2002 Thessaloniki	Sonja Pfeilschifter (GER)	Gabriele Bühlmann (SUI)	Lyubov Galkina (RUS)
2003 Gothenburg	Lyubov Galkina (RUS)	Hanna Etula (FIN)	Dorothee Bauer (GER)
2004 Győr	Kateřina Kůrková (CZE)	Sonja Pfeilschifter (GER)	Monika Haselsberger (AUT)
2005 Tallinn	Barbara Lechner (GER)	Lyubov Galkina (RUS)	Agnieszka Staroń (POL)
2006 Moscow	Tatiana Goldobina (RUS)	Sonja Pfeilschifter (GER)	Kateřina Kůrková (CZE)
2007 Deauville	Kateřina Kůrková (CZE)	Hanna Etula (FIN)	Sonja Pfeilschifter (GER)
2008 Winterthur	Lyubov Galkina (RUS)	Kateřina Emmons (CZE)	Olga Desyatskaya (RUS)
2009 Prague	Snježana Pejčić (CRO)	Beate Gauß (GER)	Pavla Kalná (CZE)
2010 Meraker	Andrea Arsović (SRB)	Beate Gauß (GER)	Jessica Mager (GER)
2011 Brescia	Sonja Pfeilschifter (GER)	Marjo Yli-Kiikka (FIN)	Daria Tykhova (UKR)
2012 Vierumäki	Sonja Pfeilschifter (GER)	Kateřina Emmons (CZE)	Andrea Arsović (SRB)
2013 Odense	Lisa Ungerank (AUT)	Martina Pica (ITA)	Živa Dvoršak (SLO)
2014 Moscow	Julianna Miskolczi (HUN)	Andrea Arsović (SRB)	Ivana Maksimović (SRB)
2015 Arnhem	Selina Gschwandtner (GER)	Sabrina Sena (ITA)	Nina Laura Kreutzer (GER)
2016 Győr	Andrea Arsović (SRB)	Malin Westerheim (NOR)	Petra Lustenberger (SUI)
2017 Maribor	Snježana Pejčić (CRO)	Stine Nielsen (DEN)	Daria Vdovina (RUS)
2018 Győr	Stine Nielsen (DEN)	Katarzyna Komorowska (POL)	Manon Smeets (NED)
2019 Osijek	Laura-Georgeta Coman (ROU)	Nina Christen (SUI)	Franziska Peer (AUT)
2020 Wrocław	Laura-Georgeta Coman (ROU)	Anastasiia Galashina (RUS)	Andrea Arsović (SRB)
2021 Osijek	Océanne Muller (FRA)	Jessie Kaps (BEL)	Sofia Ceccarello (ITA)
2022 Hammar	Teodora Vukojević (SRB)	Océanne Muller (FRA)	Jessie Kaps (BEL)
2023 Tallinn	Jeanette Hegg Duestad (NOR)	Seonaid McIntosh (GBR)	Anna Janssen (GER)
2024 Győr	Anna Janssen (GER)	Julia Piotrowska (POL)	Audrey Gogniat (SUI)
2025 Osijek	Laura Ilie (ROM)	Audrey Gogniat (SUI)	Aleksandra Havran (SRB)
2026 Yerevan	Pernille Nor-Woll (NOR)	Anna Janssen (GER)	Elif Duygu Eren (TUR)

=== 50 m rifle prone ===
Event	Gold	Silver	Bronze
1959 Milano	Zinaida Zelenkova (URS)	Elena Zaharchenko (URS)	Elena Donskaya (URS)
1961 Budapest	Istvanne Veress (HUN)	Elena Donskaya (URS)	Tatiana Ryabinskaya (URS)
1965 Bucharest	Tamara Komaristova (URS)	Brigitte Bareither (FRG)	Barbara Kopyt (POL)
1969 Versailles	Desanka Perović (YUG)	Gerlinde Popp (FRG)	Liron Nelly (FRA)
1971 Suhl	Eulalia Rolińska (POL)	Melania Petrescu (RUM)	Anne Travis (GBR)
1974 Vingsted	Mirjana Mašić (YUG)	Gerlinde Geyer (FRG)	Odette Meuter (BEL)
1975 Sofia	Marlies Kanthak (GDR)	Nonka Shatarova (BUL)	Odette Meuter (BEL)
1976 Skopje	Anka Pelova (BUL)	Elisabeth Lesou (FRA)	Elisabeth Balș (GBR)
1977 Rome	Marlies Kanthak (GDR)	Elke Becker (FRG)	Anne Travis (GBR)
1978 Hämeenlinna	Niculina Iosif (RUM)	Marlies Moch (GDR)	Odette Meuter (BEL)
1979 Frankfurt	Anka Pelova (BUL)	Odette Meuter (BEL)	Anita Enqvist (SWE)
1980 Madrid	Ermira Dingu (ALB)	Marlies Helbig (GDR)	Huberta Mueller (AUT)
1981 Titograd	Dominique Esnault (FRA)	Sarah Cooper (GBR)	Monika Sonnet (FRG)
1982 Rome	Eva Forian (HUN)	Dominique Esnault (FRA)	Marlies Helbig (GDR)
1983 Bucharest	Mirjana Jovović (YUG)	Nonka Matova (BUL)	Vesela Letcheva (BUL)
1985 Osijek	Nonka Matova (BUL)	Krassimira Dontcheva (BUL)	Margareta Gustafsson (SWE)
1987 Lahti	Diana Ossoliker (URS)	Selma Sonnet (FRG)	Krassimira Dontcheva (BUL)
1989 Zagreb	Anna Malukhina (URS)	Lenka Koloušková (TCH)	Valentina Cherkasova (URS)
1991 Bologna	Vesela Letcheva (BUL)	Jasminka Francki (YUG)	Lessia Leskiv (URS)
1993 Brno	Lessia Leskiv (UKR)	Anna Malukhina (RUS)	Iryna Shylava (BLR)
1995 Zurich	Vesela Letcheva (BUL)	Anna Malukhina (RUS)	Kirsten Obel (GER)
1997 Kouvola	Renata Mauer (POL)	Suzana Skoko (CRO)	Lindy Hansen (NOR)
1999 Bordeaux	Natallia Kalnysh (UKR)	Vesela Letcheva (BUL)	Lessia Leskiv (UKR)
2001 Zagreb	Sonja Pfeilschifter (GER)	Valérie Bellenoue (FRA)	Natallia Kalnysh (UKR)
2003 Plzeň	Tatiyana Yushkova (RUS)	Lucie Valová (CZE)	Sonja Pfeilschifter (GER)
2005 Belgrade	Sonja Pfeilschifter (GER)	Marjo Yli-Kiikka (FIN)	Sonja Staub (SUI)
2007 Granada	Beáta Krzyzewsky (HUN)	Sharon Lee (GBR)	Solveig Bibard (FRA)
2009 Osijek	Marie Enqvist (SWE)	Hanna Etula (FIN)	Viktoria Ivancheva (BLR)
2011 Belgrade	Marie Enqvist (SWE)	Michelle Smith (GBR)	Sonja Pfeilschifter (GER)
2013 Osijek	Natallia Kalnysh (UKR)	Ramona Goessler (GER)	Kata Veres (HUN)
2015 Maribor	Adéla Sýkorová (CZE)	Snježana Pejčić (CRO)	Yulia Karimova (RUS)
2017 Baku	Jennifer McIntosh (GBR)	Dariya Sharipova (UKR)	Marie Enqvist (SWE)
2019 Bologna	Yulia Zykova (RUS)	Eva Rösken (GER)	Gitta Bajos (HUN)

=== 50 m rifle three positions ===
Event	Gold	Silver	Bronze
1957 Belgrade	Zinaida Kormyshkina (URS)	Eliska Stara (TCH)	Ruffa Temnikova (URS)
1959 Milano	Elena Zaharchenko (URS)	Zinaida Zelenkova (URS)	Elena Donskaya (URS)
1961 Budapest	Tatiana Ryabinskaya (URS)	Tamara Lomova (URS)	Renate Wischnewski (GDR)
1969 Versailles	Elena Zaharchenko (URS)	Tatiana Ratnikova (URS)	Ludmila Střižíková (TCH)
1971 Suhl	Mirjana Mašić (YUG)	Tatiana Ratnikova (URS)	Kira Boiko (URS)
1974 Vingsted	Maria Harisova (TCH)	Baiba Zarina (URS)	Marie Svarcova (TCH)
1975 Sofia	Anka Pelova (BUL)	Marlies Kanthak (GDR)	Baiba Zarina (URS)
1976 Skopje	Anka Pelova (BUL)	Marlies Kanthak (GDR)	Margitta Krüger (GDR)
1977 Rome	Marlies Kanthak (GDR)	Valentina Makarova (URS)	Anka Pelova (BUL)
1978 Hämeenlinna	Kira Boiko (URS)	Marlies Kanthak (GDR)	Margitta Krüger (GDR)
1979 Frankfurt	Eva Forian (HUN)	Nonka Matova (BUL)	Valeria Sabatka (YUG)
1980 Madrid	Kira Boiko (URS)	Huberta Mueller (AUT)	Vesela Letcheva (BUL)
1981 Titograd	Marlies Helbig (GDR)	Eva Forian (HUN)	Svetlana Komaristova (URS)
1982 Rome	Sirpa Ylönen (FIN)	Marlies Helbig (GDR)	Eva Forian (HUN)
1983 Bucharest	Marlies Helbig (GDR)	Nonka Matova (BUL)	Vesela Letcheva (BUL)
1985 Osijek	Nonka Matova (BUL)	Vesela Letcheva (BUL)	Diana Ossoliker (URS)
1987 Lahti	Vesela Letcheva (BUL)	Anna Malukhina (URS)	Lenka Kolouskova (TCH)
1989 Zagreb	Anna Malukhina (URS)	Nonka Matova (BUL)	Selma Sonnet (FRG)
1991 Bologna	Nonka Matova (BUL)	Vesela Letcheva (BUL)	Jasminka Francki (YUG)
1993 Brno	Vesela Letcheva (BUL)	Anna Malukhina (RUS)	Sabina Fuchs (SUI)
1995 Zurich	Vesela Letcheva (BUL)	Kirsten Obel (GER)	Silvia Seiderer (GER)
1997 Kouvola	Renata Mauer (POL)	Sonja Pfeilschifter (GER)	Irina Gerasimenok (RUS)
1999 Bordeaux	Lyubov Galkina (RUS)	Vesela Letcheva (BUL)	Irina Gerasimenok (RUS)
2001 Zagreb	Sonja Pfeilschifter (GER)	Martina Prekel (GER)	Irina Gerasimenok (RUS)
2003 Plzeň	Tatiyana Yushkova (RUS)	Sonja Pfeilschifter (GER)	Lyubov Galkina (RUS)
2005 Belgrade	Tatiana Goldobina (RUS)	Natallia Kalnysh (UKR)	Barbara Lechner (GER)
2007 Granada	Natallia Kalnysh (UKR)	Barbara Lechner (GER)	Sonja Pfeilschifter (GER)
2009 Osijek	Tatiana Goldobina (RUS)	Barbara Lechner (GER)	Sonja Pfeilschifter (GER)
2011 Belgrade	Sonja Pfeilschifter (GER)	Barbara Lechner (GER)	Lyubov Galkina (RUS)
2013 Osijek	Amelie Kleinmanns (GER)	Snježana Pejčić (CRO)	Ivana Maksimović (SRB)
2015 Maribor	Ivana Maksimović (SRB)	Petra Zublasing (ITA)	Barbara Engleder (GER)
2017 Baku	Seonaid McIntosh (GBR)	Franziska Peer (AUT)	Jolyn Beer (GER)
2019 Bologna	Nina Christen (SUI)	Maria Martynova (BLR)	Jenny Stene (NOR)

== Mixed ==
=== 10 m air pistol ===
Event	Gold	Silver	Bronze
2013 Odense	(Germany) Sandra Hornung; Christian Reitz	(Serbia) Zorana Arunović; Damir Mikec	(Ukraine) Olena Kostevych; Oleh Omelchuk
2014 Moscow	(Russia) Liubov Yaskevich; Anton Gurianov	(Serbia) Bobana Veličković; Damir Mikec	(Belarus) Viktoriya Chaika; Yuri Dauhapolau
2015 Arnhem	(Portugal) Joana Castelão; João Costa	(Russia) Yekaterina Korshunova; Vladimir Isakov	(Russia) Vitalina Batsarashkina; Vladimir Gontcharov
2016 Győr	(Serbia) Zorana Arunović; Damir Mikec	(Ukraine) Olena Kostevych; Oleh Omelchuk	(Czech Republic) Silvie Ziskalova; Jindrich Dubovy
2017 Maribor	(Serbia) Zorana Arunović; Damir Mikec	(Russia) Vitalina Batsarashkina; Vladimir Gontcharov	(Azerbaijan) Ruslan Lunev; Nigar Nasirova
2018 Győr	(Russia) Margarita Lomova; Artem Chernousov	(Serbia) Zorana Arunović; Damir Mikec	(Ukraine) Olena Kostevych; Oleh Omelchuk
2019 Osijek	(Ukraine) Olena Kostevych; Oleh Omelchuk	(Russia) Vitalina Batsarashkina; Artem Chernousov	(Serbia) Zorana Arunović; Damir Mikec
2020 Wrocław	(Russia) Vitalina Batsarashkina; Artem Chernousov	(Serbia) Zorana Arunović; Damir Mikec	(Switzerland) Jason Solari; Heidi Diethelm Gerber
2021 Osijek	(Russia) Vitalina Batsarashkina; Artem Chernousov	(Serbia) Zorana Arunović; Damir Mikec	(Portugal) Joana Castelão; João Costa
2022 Hamar	(Germany) Sandra Reitz; Robin Walter	(Bulgaria) Antoaneta Kostadinova; Kiril Kirov	(Italy) Sara Costantino; Paolo Monna
2022 Hamar	(Germany) Sandra Reitz; Robin Walter	(Bulgaria) Antoaneta Kostadinova; Kiril Kirov	(Serbia) Zorana Arunović; Damir Mikec
2023 Taallinn	(Serbia) Zorana Arunović; Damir Mikec	(Italy) Chiara Giancamilli; Federico Nilo Maldini	(Turkey) Şevval İlayda Tarhan; Yusuf Dikeç
2023 Taallinn	(Serbia) Zorana Arunović; Damir Mikec	(Italy) Chiara Giancamilli; Federico Nilo Maldini	(France) Camille Jedrzejewski; Florian Fouquet
2024 Győr	(Ukraine) Olena Kostevych; Oleh Omelchuk	(Austria) Sylvia Steiner; Richard Zechmeister	(Portugal) Doreen Vennekamp; Michael Schwald
2025 Osijek	(Turkey) Şevval İlayda Tarhan; Yusuf Dikeç	(Czech Republic) Viktorie Šindlerová; Pavel Schejbal	(Serbia) Zorana Arunović; Damir Mikec
2026 Yerevan	(Hungary) Veronika Major; Ákos Károly Nagy	(Turkey) Şevval İlayda Tarhan; Yusuf Dikeç	(Individual Neutral Athletes) Liubov Yaskevich; Ivan Kazak

=== 10 m air rifle ===
Event	Gold	Silver	Bronze
2013 Odense	(France) Sandy Morin; Valérian Sauveplane	(Russia) Daria Vdovina; Sergei Kruglov	(Austria) Lisa Ungerank; Bernhard Pickl
2014 Moscow	(Russia) Daria Vdovina; Sergei Kruglov	(Norway) Malin Westerheim; Are Hansen	(Italy) Petra Zublasing; Niccolò Campriani
2015 Arnhem	(Serbia) Andrea Arsović; Milutin Stefanović	(Croatia) Snježana Pejčić; Petar Gorša	(Russia) Anna Zhukova; Sergei Kruglov
2016 Győr	(Serbia) Andrea Arsović; Milutin Stefanović	(Russia) Daria Vdovina; Vladimir Maslennikov	(Croatia) Snježana Pejčić; Petar Gorša
2017 Maribor	(Serbia) Andrea Arsović; Milutin Stefanović	(Russia) Daria Vdovina; Vladimir Maslennikov	(Germany) Selina Gschwandtner; Maximilian Dallinger
2018 Győr	(Russia) Daria Vdovina; Vladimir Maslennikov	(Serbia) Andrea Arsović; Milutin Stefanović	(Ukraine) Anna Ilina; Oleh Tsarkov
2019 Osijek	(Russia) Vladimir Maslennikov; Anastasiia Galashina	(Italy) Petra Zublasing; Marco Suppini	(Germany) Julian Simon; Julian Justus
2020 Wrocław	(Russia) Vladimir Maslennikov; Yulia Karimova	(Hungary) István Péni; Eszter Dénes	(Croatia) Miran Maričić; Estera Herceg
2021 Osijek	(France) Océanne Muller; Brian Baudouin	(Russia) Anastasiia Galashina; Vladimir Maslennikov	(Russia) Yulia Karimova; Sergey Kamenskiy
2022 Hamar	(Israel) Tal Engler; Sergey Richter	(Serbia) Andrea Arsović; Lazar Kovačević	Switzerland Chiara Leone; Jan Lochbihler
2022 Hamar	(Israel) Tal Engler; Sergey Richter	(Serbia) Andrea Arsović; Lazar Kovačević	Italy Martina Ziviani; Riccardo Armiraglio
2023 Tallinn	(Norway) Jeanette Hegg Duestad; Jon-Hermann Hegg	(Israel) Olga Tashtchiev; Sergey Richter	(Italy) Sofia Ceccarello; Danilo Sollazzo
2023 Tallinn	(Norway) Jeanette Hegg Duestad; Jon-Hermann Hegg	(Israel) Olga Tashtchiev; Sergey Richter	(Norway) Jenny Stene; Henrik Larsen
2024 Győr	(Germany) Anna Janssen; Maximilian Ulbrich	(France) Océanne Muller; Lucas Kryzs	(Sweden) Isabelle Johansson; Marcus Madsen
2025 Osijek	(Switzerland) Audrey Gogniat; Jan Lochbihler	(Serbia) Aleksandra Havran; Aleksa Rakonjac	(Norway) Jeanette Hegg Duestad; Jon-Hermann Hegg
2026 Yerevan	(Norway) Jeanette Hegg Duestad; Jon-Hermann Hegg	(Germany) Anna Janssen; Maximilian Ulbrich	(Sweden) Amanda Karlsson; Victor Lindgren

== See also ==
- List of medalists at the European Shotgun Championships
