= 1971 European 10 m Events Championships =

- Dates: 16 - 20 March
- Host city: Meziboří, Czechoslovakia
- Level: Senior
- Events: 4 men (2 individual + 2 team); 4 women (2 individual + 2 team)

The 1971 European 10 m Events Championships was the 1st edition of the special 10 m events competition, European 10 m Events Championships, organised by the International Shooting Sport Federation.

== Results ==
=== Men ===
Event	Gold		Silver		Bronze	
Event	Athletes	Pts	Athletes	Pts	Athletes	Pts
Air rifle 40 rounds	(Soviet Union) Vladislav Roscocalov	387	(Soviet Union) Vitaly Parkhimovich	387	(West Germany) Gottfried Kustermann	382
Air rifle 40 rounds, team	Soviet Union; Vladislav Roscocalov; Vitaly Parkhimovich; Nikolai Raschetnov; Vladislav Raskovalov		West Germany; Bernd Klingner; Peter Kohnke; Gottfried Kustermann; Klaus Zähringer		Hungary; György Abonyi; Bela Nagy; Sandor Nagy; Ferenc Petrovacz	
Air pistol 40 rounds	(Soviet Union) Vladimir Stolypin	387	(Soviet Union) Grigory Kosykh	386	(Sweden) Kjell Jacobsson	385
Air pistol 40 rounds, team	Poland; Karol Chodkiewicz; Wacław Hamerliński; Paweł Małek; Rajmund Stachurski		Soviet Union; Vladimir Stolypin; Grigory Kosykh; Anatoli Egrishin; Yevgeny Rasskazov		Romania; Virgil Atanasiu; Lucian Giusca; Dan Iuga; Iluiu Pieptea	

=== Women ===
Event	Gold		Silver		Bronze	
Event	Athletes	Pts	Athletes	Pts	Athletes	Pts
Air rifle	(Romania) Edda Baia	379	(Soviet Union) Tamara Cherkasova	375	(West Germany) Monika Riesterer	375
Air rifle, team	Soviet Union; Tamara Cherkasova; Tatiana Ratnikova; Baiba Zarina		West Germany; Monika Riesterer; Margret Hundeshagen; Ingrid Kappes		Romania; Edda Baia; Melania Petrescu; Veronica Stroe	
Air pistol	(Czechoslovakia) Klotylda Tesarova	378	(Romania) Anisoara Matei	377	(Soviet Union) Nadezda Ibragimova	376
Air pistol, team	Soviet Union; Nadezda Ibragimova; Inna Ivanova; Nina Stoliarova		West Germany; Ruth Kasten; Karin Fitzner; Brigitte Kammann		Czechoslovakia; Bedriska Blahenova; Eva Englerova; Klotylda Tesarova	

== Medal table ==
Host country

#	Country	1st place, gold medalist(s)	2nd place, silver medalist(s)	3rd place, bronze medalist(s)	Tot.
1	Soviet Union	5	4	1	10
2	Romania	1	1	2	4
3	Czechoslovakia	1	0	1	2
4	Poland	1	0	0	1
5	West Germany	0	3	2	5
6	Sweden	0	0	1	1
6	Hungary	0	0	1	1
Total		8	8	8	24

== See also ==
- European Shooting Confederation
- International Shooting Sport Federation
- List of medalists at the European Shooting Championships
- List of medalists at the European Shotgun Championships
