= Shooting at the 1972 Summer Olympics – Mixed 50 metre pistol =

50 metre free pistol at the Games of the XX Olympiad
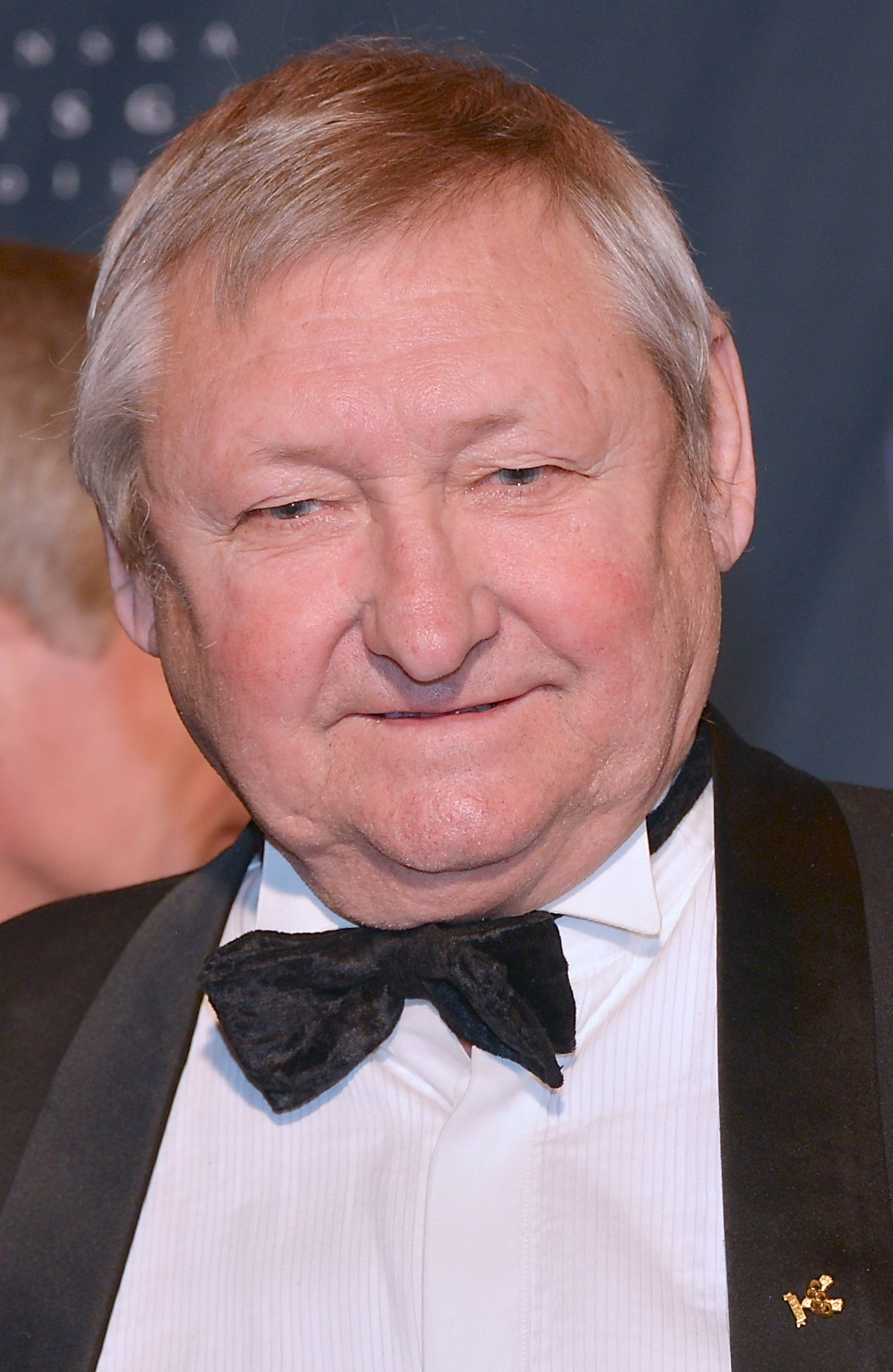
- Ragnar Skanåker (2013)
- Venue: Schießanlage
- Date: August 27, 1972
- Competitors: 64 from 41 nations
- Winning score: 567 OR

Medalists
1st place, gold medalist(s)		Ragnar Skanåker; Sweden
2nd place, silver medalist(s)		Daniel Iuga; Romania
3rd place, bronze medalist(s)		Rudolf Dollinger; Austria

The mixed (or "open") ISSF 50 meter pistol was a competition at the 1972 Summer Olympics. It was held on 27 August 1972 at Schießanlage in Munich. There were 59 competitors from 36 nations. Nations had been limited to two shooters each since the 1952 Games.

The defending champion was Grigory Kosykh of the Soviet Union, who also held the world record with 572. He would not be a factor at these Games as he struggled and finished a distant eighth. The gold medal was won by Ragnar Skanåker who brought Sweden its first shooting gold medal in 36 years. Skanåker became a common sight at Olympic Games as he competed continuously through 1996, appearing in seven Olympics. Daniel Iuga earned Romania's first medal in the event with his silver, while Rudolf Dollinger earned Austria's first with his bronze.

== Background ==
This was the 13th appearance of the ISSF 50 meter pistol event. The event was held at every Summer Olympics from 1896 to 1920 (except 1904, when no shooting events were held) and from 1936 to 2016; it was open to women from 1968 to 1980. 1896 and 1908 were the only Games in which the distance was not 50 metres; the former used 30 metres and the latter 50 yards.

Four of the top 10 shooters from the 1968 Games returned: gold medalist Grigory Kosykh of the Soviet Union, silver medalist Heinz Mertel of West Germany, bronze medalist Harald Vollmar of East Germany, and tenth-place finisher Vladimir Stolypin of the Soviet Union. Stolypin had been the 1962 and 1966 world champion, but Vollmar was the champion in 1970. Dencho Denev of Bulgaria and Hynek Hromada of Czechoslovakia had finished second and third, respectively, to both Stolypin in 1966 and Vollmar in 1970; they were competing at the Olympics again seeking better results than in 1968, when neither made the top 10.

Albania, Belize (then British Honduras), Bolivia, and the Virgin Islands each made their debut in the event. The United States made its 12th appearance, most of any nation, having missed only the 1900 event.

Skanåker used a TsKIB SOO MЦ55.

== Competition format ==
Each shooter fired 60 shots, in 6 series of 10 shots each, at a distance of 50 metres. The target was round, 50 centimetres in diameter, with 10 scoring rings. Scoring for each shot was up to 10 points, in increments of 1 point. The maximum score possible was 600 points. Any pistol was permitted.

Ties were broken by the best score in the sixth series, if still tied best score in fifth series, this continues until the tie is broken.

== Records ==
Prior to this competition, the existing world and Olympic records were as follows.

World record	Grigory Kosykh (URS)	572	Plzeň, Czechoslovakia	1969
Olympic record	Grigory Kosykh (URS); Heinz Mertel (FRG)	562	Mexico City, Mexico	18 October 1968

Ragnar Skanåker beat the Olympic record by five points. Daniel Iuga, in second place, matched the old record.

== Schedule ==
Date	Time	Round
Sunday, 27 August 1972	9:00	Final

== Results ==
Rank	Shooter	Nation	1	2	3	4	5	6	Total	Notes
1st place, gold medalist(s)	Ragnar Skanåker	Sweden	98	92	95	94	97	91	567	OR
2nd place, silver medalist(s)	Daniel Iuga	Romania	93	92	92	95	96	94	562	
3rd place, bronze medalist(s)	Rudolf Dollinger	Austria	91	96	92	94	95	92	560	
4	Rajmund Stachurski	Poland	91	88	99	95	92	94	559	
5	Harald Vollmar	East Germany	93	93	94	93	93	92	558	
6	Hynek Hromada	Czechoslovakia	90	94	92	95	92	93	556	
7	Kornél Marosvári	Hungary	90	90	93	92	94	96	555	
8	Grigory Kosykh	Soviet Union	92	93	94	93	93	90	555	
9	Gérard Denecheau	France	92	92	90	95	92	93	554	
10	Kjell Jacobsson	Sweden	92	91	93	94	92	92	554	
11	Dencho Denev	Bulgaria	91	88	93	94	97	91	554	
12	Miroslav Štefan	Czechoslovakia	91	93	95	93	94	88	554	
13	John Rødseth	Norway	91	93	94	93	92	90	553	
14	Frank Wyatt	Great Britain	90	93	89	95	90	95	552	
15	Heinrich Fretwurst	West Germany	90	92	94	93	91	91	551	
16	Heinz Mertel	West Germany	92	91	90	91	92	94	550	
17	Vladimir Stolypin	Soviet Union	88	94	88	93	95	92	550	
18	Jean Faggion	France	83	95	90	96	95	90	549	
19	Seppo Irjala	Finland	95	92	89	93	90	89	548	
20	Pál Katkó	Hungary	89	94	90	97	89	89	548	
21	Hubert Garschall	Austria	91	91	93	95	90	88	548	
22	Shigetoshi Tashiro	Japan	89	92	90	93	92	90	546	
23	Zbigniew Fedyczak	Poland	90	90	95	92	90	89	546	
24	Fatos Pilkati	Albania	93	92	92	93	87	89	546	
25	Yoshihisa Yoshikawa	Japan	94	90	87	91	92	91	545	
26	Immo Huhtinen	Finland	93	89	93	87	94	89	545	
27	Gilberto Fernández	Colombia	90	88	93	86	91	96	544	
28	Jimmie Dorsey	United States	94	87	89	88	92	94	544	
29	Ivan Mandov	Bulgaria	89	90	96	92	85	82	544	
30	Fernando Miranda	Puerto Rico	89	91	91	93	91	88	543	
31	Harry Cullum	Great Britain	87	93	87	90	93	92	542	
32	Edward Jans	Canada	94	90	91	86	92	89	542	
33	Petar Bajić	Yugoslavia	85	87	93	96	91	89	541	
34	Hershel Anderson	United States	91	92	88	91	90	88	540	
35	Tserenjavyn Ölziibayar	Mongolia	89	93	87	89	91	90	539	
36	Bertino de Souza	Brazil	86	93	89	90	92	89	539	
37	Sutham Aswanit	Thailand	87	93	89	91	90	89	539	
38	Dimitrios Kotronis	Greece	93	86	97	84	92	87	539	
39	Tüdeviin Myagmarjav	Mongolia	88	90	89	88	90	92	537	
40	Samak Chainares	Thailand	89	89	89	96	87	87	537	
41	Severino Requejo	Spain	88	93	86	85	89	95	536	
42	Juventino Sánchez	Mexico	91	92	90	87	88	88	536	
43	Jorge Henao	Colombia	88	83	93	89	91	91	535	
44	Santiago Trompeta	Cuba	93	87	89	91	87	88	535	
45	Jules Sobrian	Canada	91	87	91	89	88	88	534	
46	Durval Guimarães	Brazil	90	87	92	88	93	84	534	
47	Arturo Macapagal	Philippines	88	88	90	88	88	91	533	
48	Santiago Machuca	Puerto Rico	91	88	91	84	92	87	533	
49	Hồ Minh Thu	Vietnam	80	89	93	86	83	93	524	
50	Teodoro Kalaw	Philippines	82	83	92	90	88	89	524	
51	Afërdita Tusha	Albania	85	94	87	83	87	86	522	
52	André Zoltan	Belgium	88	85	85	91	87	85	521	
53	Jaime Sánchez	Bolivia	84	91	89	88	79	83	514	
54	John Harun	Kenya	86	83	85	90	85	83	512	
55	André Antunes	Portugal	83	85	90	85	81	86	510	
56	Hương Hoàng Thi	Vietnam	80	77	80	85	84	81	487	
57	José Álvarez	Virgin Islands	76	81	85	85	76	83	486	
58	Abdul Rahman Omar	Kenya	73	84	79	78	73	87	474	
59	Owen Phillips	British Honduras	49	70	57	61	73	66	376	
—	Armando Rigual	Cuba	DNS							
—	Gaute Flesland	Norway	DNS							
—	Gi Man Sonu	North Korea	DNS							
—	Lucian Giușcă	Romania	DNS							
—	Zakai Hakki	Syria	DNS							
