= Shooting at the 1976 Summer Olympics – Mixed 50 metre pistol =

Olympic shooting event

Men's 50 metre free pistol at the Games of the XXI Olympiad
- Shooting pictogram
- Venue: Olympic Shooting Range, L'Acadie
- Date: 18 July 1976
- Competitors: 47 from 31 nations
- Winning time: 573 WR

Medalists
| 1st place, gold medalist(s) | | Uwe Potteck; East Germany |
| 2nd place, silver medalist(s) | | Harald Vollmar; East Germany |
| 3rd place, bronze medalist(s) | | Rudolf Dollinger; Austria |

The mixed (or "open") ISSF 50 meter pistol was a shooting sports event held as part of the Shooting at the 1976 Summer Olympics programme. It was the fourteenth appearance of the event. The competition was held on 18 July 1976 at the shooting ranges in Montreal. 47 shooters from 31 nations competed. Nations had been limited to two shooters each since the 1952 Games. The event was won by Uwe Potteck, with East Germany finishing 1–2 as Harald Vollmar took silver. It was East Germany's first victory in the event. Rudolf Dollinger of Austria repeated as bronze medalist. Vollmar (the 1968 bronze winner) and Dollinger were the fifth and sixth men to win multiple medals in the free pistol. Potteck had only begun the sport 23 months prior to his victory and his previous personal best in domestic competitions was a 568. In addition, his practice scores leading up to the games averaged around 563 to 565.

== Background ==
This was the 14th appearance of the ISSF 50 meter pistol event. The event was held at every Summer Olympics from 1896 to 1920 (except 1904, when no shooting events were held) and from 1936 to 2016; it was nominally open to women from 1968 to 1980, although very few women participated these years. A separate women's event would be introduced in 1984. 1896 and 1908 were the only Games in which the distance was not 50 metres; the former used 30 metres and the latter 50 yards.

Six of the top 10 shooters from the 1972 Games returned: gold medalist Ragnar Skanåker of Sweden, silver medalist Daniel Iuga of Romania, bronze medalist Rudolf Dollinger of Austria, fifth-place finisher (and 1968 bronze medalist) Harald Vollmar of East Germany, eighth-place finisher (and 1968 gold medalist) world record holder Grigory Kosykh of the Soviet Union, and tenth-place finisher Kjell Jacobsson of Sweden. Reigning (1974) world champion Georgi Zapolski was not on the Soviet Olympic team, but runner-up Ivan Nemethy of Czechoslovakia and third-place finisher Harald Vollmar (who had won in 1970) were competing in Montreal.

For the first time, no nations made their debut in the event. The United States made its 13th appearance, most of any nation, having missed only the 1900 event.

Potteck used a Tula TOZ 35.

== Competition format ==
Each shooter fired 60 shots, in 6 series of 10 shots each, at a distance of 50 metres. The target was round, 50 centimetres in diameter, with 10 scoring rings. Scoring for each shot was up to 10 points, in increments of 1 point. The maximum score possible was 600 points. Any pistol was permitted.

== Records ==
Prior to this competition, the existing world and Olympic records were as follows.

| World record | Grigory Kosykh (URS); Harald Vollmar (GDR) | 572 | Plzeň, Czechoslovakia; Madrid, Spain | 1969; 1975 |
| Olympic record | Ragnar Skanåker (SWE) | 567 | Munich, West Germany | 27 August 1972 |

Uwe Potteck beat the world record by 1 point, finishing at 573 points. Harald Vollmar, in second place, matched the old Olympic record.

== Schedule ==
| Date | Time | Round |
|---|---|---|
| Sunday, 18 July 1976 | 8:00 | Final |

== Results ==
| Rank | Shooter | Nation | Score | Notes |
|---|---|---|---|---|
| 1st place, gold medalist(s) | Uwe Potteck | East Germany | 573 | WR |
| 2nd place, silver medalist(s) | Harald Vollmar | East Germany | 567 | |
| 3rd place, bronze medalist(s) | Rudolf Dollinger | Austria | 562 | |
| 4 | Heinz Mertel | West Germany | 560 | |
| 5 | Ragnar Skanåker | Sweden | 559 | |
| 6 | Vincenzo Tondo | Italy | 559 | |
| 7 | Grigory Kosykh | Soviet Union | 559 | |
| 8 | Dencho Denev | Bulgaria | 557 | |
| 9 | Bertino de Souza | Brazil | 556 | |
| 10 | Hershel Anderson | United States | 556 | |
| 11 | Jean Faggion | France | 554 | |
| 12 | Laszlo Antal | Great Britain | 553 | |
| 12 | Sławomir Romanowski | Poland | 553 | |
| 14 | André Porthault | France | 552 | |
| 14 | Kjell Jacobsson | Sweden | 552 | |
| 14 | Ivan Némethy | Czechoslovakia | 552 | |
| 17 | Enzo Contegno | Italy | 551 | |
| 18 | Lyubcho Dyakov | Bulgaria | 550 | |
| 18 | Roman Burkard | Switzerland | 550 | |
| 18 | Akin Ersoy | Turkey | 550 | |
| 2T | Shigetoshi Tashiro | Japan | 549 | |
| 2T | John Rødseth | Norway | 549 | |
| 23 | Tom Guinn | Canada | 548 | |
| 24 | Jules Sobrian | Canada | 547 | |
| 24 | Gerhard Beyer | West Germany | 547 | |
| 26 | Tüdeviin Myagmarjav | Mongolia | 546 | |
| 26 | Marlen Papava | Soviet Union | 546 | |
| 28 | Masanobu Ohata | Japan | 545 | |
| 29 | Paulo Lamego | Brazil | 544 | |
| 30 | Hubert Garschall | Austria | 543 | |
| 31 | Niels Dahl | Denmark | 542 | |
| 32 | Norman Harrison | Australia | 540 | |
| 32 | Johnny Cannizzaro | Puerto Rico | 540 | |
| 34 | Daniel Iuga | Romania | 539 | |
| 35 | Miroslav Štefan | Czechoslovakia | 537 | |
| 36 | Tserenjavyn Ölziibayar | Mongolia | 536 | |
| 37 | Arturo Macapagal | Philippines | 534 | |
| 37 | Richard Crawford | United States | 534 | |
| 39 | Jaime Sánchez | Bolivia | 531 | |
| 39 | Javier Padilla | Mexico | 531 | |
| 41 | Sutham Aswanit | Thailand | 529 | |
| 42 | Jonathan Gillman | Australia | 525 | |
| 43 | Juan Casey | Argentina | 515 | |
| 43 | Anne Goffin | Belgium | 515 | |
| 45 | Veera Uppapong | Thailand | 507 | |
| 46 | Camilo Pedro | Hong Kong | 490 | |
| 47 | John Waight | Belize | 419 | |
