= Austria at the 1976 Summer Olympics =

- IOC code: AUT
- NOC: Austrian Olympic Committee

in Montreal, Canada 17 July–1 August
- Competitors: 60 (54 men and 6 women) in 15 sports
- Flag bearer: Günther Pfaff
- Medals Ranked 37th: Gold 0 Silver 0 Bronze 1 Total 1

Summer Olympics appearances (overview)
- 1896; 1900; 1904; 1908; 1912; 1920; 1924; 1928; 1932; 1936; 1948; 1952; 1956; 1960; 1964; 1968; 1972; 1976; 1980; 1984; 1988; 1992; 1996; 2000; 2004; 2008; 2012; 2016; 2020; 2024

Other related appearances
- 1906 Intercalated Games

Austria competed at the 1976 Summer Olympics in Montreal, Quebec, Canada. 60 competitors, 54 men and 6 women, took part in 44 events in 15 sports.

== Medalists ==
Medal	Name	Sport	Event
Bronze	Rudolf Dollinger	Shooting	Men's Free Pistol

== Archery ==
In its first appearance in the archery competition at the Olympics, Austria entered one man.

Men's Individual Competition:

- Oswald Probts – 2173 points (→ 33rd place)

== Athletics ==
Men's Decathlon

- Georg Werthner
  - Final – 7443 points (→ 16th place)

== Cycling ==
Six cyclists represented Austria in 1976.

Individual road race

- Herbert Spindler – 4:49:01 (→ 18th place)
- Roman Humenberger – 4:49:01 (→ 21st place)
- Wolfgang Steinmayr – 4:49:01 (→ 27th place)
- Rudolf Mitteregger – 5:00:19 (→ 51st place)

Team time trial

- Leo Karner
- Roman Humenberger
- Rudolf Mitteregger
- Johann Summer

== Fencing ==
Five fencers, all men, represented Austria in 1976.

Men's épée

- Karl-Heinz Müller
- Peter Zobl-Wessely
- Herbert Lindner

Men's team épée

- Herbert Lindner, Karl-Heinz Müller, Herbert Polzhuber, Peter Zobl-Wessely

Men's sabre

- Hanns Brandstätter

== Sailing ==
Open

Athlete	Event	Race							Net points	Final rank
Athlete	Event	1	2	3	4	5	6	7	Net points	Final rank
Ernst Seidl; Johann Eisl	Flying Dutchman	15	10	7	12	2	~~16~~	15	92.0	13
Hans Prack; Bernhard Prack	Tornado	~~10~~	8	6	10	3	10	9	78.4	11
Carl Auteried Jr. Wolfgang Böhm	Tempest	10	14	11	11	5	11	~~DNS~~	97.0	12
Hubert Raudaschl; Walter Raudaschl; Rudolf Mayr	Soling	13	17	15	~~20~~	9	16	17	123.0	17

== Shooting ==
Open

Athlete	Event	Final	
Athlete	Event	Score	Rank
Rudolf Dollinger	50 m free pistol	562	Bronze medal
Hubert Garschall	50 m free pistol	543	30
Gerhard Krimbacher	50 m rifle three positions	1117	42
Gerhard Krimbacher	50 m rifle prone	591	12
Josef Meixner	Trap	178	16
Gerhard Petritsch	25 m rapid fire pistol	594	7
Nikolaus Reinprecht	Trap	173	25
Franz Schitzhofer	Skeet	195	5
Wolfram Waibel, Sr.	50 m rifle three positions	1123	40
Wolfram Waibel, Sr.	50 m rifle prone	590	20
