= Mongolia at the 1972 Summer Olympics =

- IOC code: MGL
- NOC: Mongolian National Olympic Committee

in Munich
- Competitors: 39 (37 men, 2 women) in 7 sports
- Flag bearer: Bazarragchaagiin Jamsran
- Medals Ranked 33rd: Gold 0 Silver 1 Bronze 0 Total 1

Summer Olympics appearances (overview)
- 1964; 1968; 1972; 1976; 1980; 1984; 1988; 1992; 1996; 2000; 2004; 2008; 2012; 2016; 2020; 2024

Mongolia competed at the 1972 Summer Olympics in Munich, West Germany. 39 competitors, 37 men and 2 women, took part in 39 events in 7 sports.

== Medalists ==
=== Silver ===
- Khorloogiin Bayanmönkh – Wrestling, freestyle heavyweight (90–100 kg)

== Archery ==
In the first modern archery competition at the Olympics, Mongolia entered one man and two women. Their highest placing competitor was Natjav Dariimaa, at 14th place in the women's competition.

Women's Individual Competition

- Natjav Dariimaa – 2341 points (→ 14th place)
- Doljin Demberel – 2152 points (→ 36th place)

Men's Individual Competition

- Galsan Biambaa – 2253 points (→ 43rd place)

== Athletics ==
Men's 100 metres

- Enkhbaatar Bjambajav

- First Heat – 10.93s (→ did not advance)

== Boxing ==
Men's Light Flyweight (– 48 kg)

- Vandui Batbayar

- First Round – Lost to Héctor Velasquez (CHL), 0:5

Men's Flyweight (– 51 kg)

- Nyamdashiin Batsüren

- Second round – Lost to Yu Jong-man (KOR), 1:4

Men's Bantamweight (– 54 kg)

- Buyangiin Ganbat

- Third round – Lost to Ricardo Carreras (USA), 2:3

Men's Featherweight (– 57 kg)

- Palamdorjiin Bayar

- Second round – Lost to Kuchno Kuchnew (BUL), 2:3

Men's Lightweight (– 60 kg)

- Khaidavyn Altankhuyag

- Third round – Lost to Eraslan Doruk (TUR), 2:3

Men's Light Welterweight (– 63.5 kg)

- Sodnomyn Gombo

- Second round – Lost to Zvonomir Vujin (YUG), 2:3

Men's Welterweight (– 67 kg)

- Damdinjavyn Bandi, (Damdinjav Bandi)

- Second round – Lost to János Kajdi (HUN), KO

Men's Light Middleweight (– 71 kg)

- Namchal Tsendaiush

- First Round – Bye
- Second Round – Lost to Jae Keun-Lim (KOR), 2:3

Men's Light Heavyweight (– 71 kg)

- Gombyn Zorig, light-heavyweight

- First round – Lost to Ahmed Mahmoud Aly (EGY), 0:5

== Judo ==
- Luvsansharavyn Rentsendorj - lost in round of 32 of Men's 93 kg

== Shooting ==
Four male shooters represented Mongolia in 1972.

25 m pistol

- Tüdeviin Myagmarjav

50 m pistol

- Tserenjavyn Ölziibayar
- Tüdeviin Myagmarjav

300 m rifle, three positions

- Yondonjamtsyn Batsükh

50 m rifle, three positions

- Mendbayaryn Jantsankhorloo
- Yondonjamtsyn Batsükh

50 m rifle, prone

- Mendbayaryn Jantsankhorloo
- Yondonjamtsyn Batsükh
