= Shooting at the Friendship Games =

Shooting at the Friendship Games was contested at the Dynamo Shooting Range in Moscow, Soviet Union between 19 and 25 August 1984.

== Medal summary ==
=== Men's events ===
Event	Gold		Silver		Bronze	
10 metre air rifle	Andreas Wolfram (GDR)	591	Milan Bakeš (TCH)	585	Juri Zavolodko (URS)	585
50 metre rifle prone	Petar Zapryanov (BUL)	599	Sergey Ivanenko (URS)	598	Andrzej Komosiński (POL)	597
50 metre rifle three positions	Milan Bakeš (TCH)	1169	Ireneusz Jagodziński (POL)	1166	Alexander Mitrofanov (URS)	1164
10 metre air pistol	Jens Potteck (GDR)	584	Anatoli Egrishchin (URS)	583	Aleksandr Melentiev (URS)	582
25 metre rapid fire pistol	Afanasijs Kuzmins (URS)	599	Krzysztof Kucharczyk (POL)	598	Ralf Schumann (GDR)	596
50 metre pistol	Aleksandr Melentiev (URS)	578	Lyubcho Dyakov (BUL)	573	Anatoli Egrishchin (URS)	568
50 metre running target	Igor Sokolov (URS)	592	Tibor Bodnár (HUN)	591	Thomas Pfeffer (GDR)	590
50 metre running target mixed	Igor Sokolov (URS)	396	Hans-Jürgen Helbig (GDR)	395	Tibor Bodnár (HUN)	395
skeet	Axel Wegner (GDR); Bernhard Hochwald (GDR)	198	none awarded	–	Aleksandr Cherkasov (URS); Alfredo Torez (CUB); Petr Málek (TCH)	197
trap	Aleksandr Asanov (URS)	199	Jörg Damme (GDR)	194	Josef Machaň (TCH)	194

=== Women's events ===
Event	Gold		Silver		Bronze	
10 metre air rifle	Svetlana Komaristova (URS)	390	Laszlone Hunyadi (HUN)	387	Marlies Ray-Helbig (GDR)	387
50 metre rifle three positions	Marlies Ray-Helbig (GDR)	583	Lessia Leskiv (URS)	579	Éva Fórián (HUN)	578
50 metre rifle prone	Nonka Matova (BUL)	599	Lessia Leskiv (URS)	597	Vesela Letcheva (BUL)	596
10 metre air pistol	Laszlóné Kotorczó (HUN)	389	Marina Dobrancheva (URS)	385	Julita Macur (POL)	385
25 metre pistol	Marina Dobrancheva (URS)	589	Valentina Koreneva (URS)	584	Galina Nedelcheva (BUL)	584

== Medal table ==
* Host nation (Soviet Union)

Rank	Nation	Gold	Silver	Bronze	Total
1	Soviet Union (URS)*	7	6	5	18
2	East Germany (GDR)	5	2	3	10
3	Bulgaria (BUL)	2	1	2	5
4	Hungary (HUN)	1	2	2	5
5	Czechoslovakia (TCH)	1	1	2	4
6	Poland (POL)	0	2	2	4
7	Cuba (CUB)	0	0	1	1
Totals (7 entries)		16	14	17	47

== See also ==
- Shooting at the 1984 Summer Olympics
