= Sailing at the 1976 Summer Olympics – Tornado =

Sailing at the Olympics

Tornado at the Games of the XXI Olympiad
- Tornado
- Venue: Kingston
- Dates: 31 July – 8 August 1976
- Competitors: 29 from 14 nations
- Teams: 14

Medalists
| 1st place, gold medalist(s) | | Reg White; John Osborn | Great Britain |
| 2nd place, silver medalist(s) | | David McFaull; Michael Rothwell | United States |
| 3rd place, bronze medalist(s) | | Jörg Spengler; Jörg Schmall | West Germany |

The Tornado was a sailing event on the Sailing at the 1976 Summer Olympics program in Kingston, Ontario. Seven races were scheduled. 29 sailors, on 14 boats, from 14 nations competed. It was the time the event had been included on the Olympic sailing program.

== Results ==
| Rank | Helmsman (Country) | Crew | Race I | | Race II | | Race III | | Race IV | | Race V | | Race VI | | Race VII | | Total Points (Note: The 1976 Olympic scoring system was used.) | Total-1 (Note: Total after applying discard.) |
| Rank | Helmsman (Country) | Crew | Rank | Points | Rank | Points | Rank | Points | Rank | Points | Rank | Points | Rank | Points | Rank | Points | Total Points | Total-1 |
|---|---|---|---|---|---|---|---|---|---|---|---|---|---|---|---|---|---|---|
| 1st place, gold medalist(s) | Reg White (GBR) | John Osborn | 1 | 0.0 | 1 | 0.0 | 5 | 10.0 | 1 | 0.0 | 4 | 8.0 | 1 | 0.0 | ~~DNS~~ | ~~20.0~~ | 38.0 | 18.0 |
| 2nd place, silver medalist(s) | David McFaull (USA) | Michael Rothwell | 8 | 14.0 | ~~10~~ | ~~16.0~~ | 1 | 0.0 | 4 | 8.0 | 2 | 3.0 | 2 | 3.0 | 4 | 8.0 | 52.0 | 36.0 |
| 3rd place, bronze medalist(s) | Jörg Spengler (FRG) | Jörg Schmall | 2 | 3.0 | 2 | 3.0 | 11 | 17.0 | ~~7~~ | ~~13.0~~ | 5 | 10.0 | 3 | 5.7 | 2 | 3.0 | 54.7 | 37.7 |
| 4 | Brian Lewis (AUS) | Warren Rock | ~~RET~~ | ~~20.0~~ | 6 | 11.7 | 2 | 3.0 | 12 | 18.0 | 1 | 0.0 | 6 | 11.7 | 1 | 0.0 | 64.4 | 44.4 |
| 5 | Peter Kolni (SWE) | Jörgen Kolni, Sven-Bertil Johansson | 9 | 15.0 | 7 | 13.0 | 3 | 5.7 | 2 | 3.0 | 9 | 15.0 | ~~12~~ | ~~18.0~~ | 3 | 5.7 | 75.4 | 57.4 |
| 6 | Walter Steiner (SUI) | Albert Schiess | 3 | 5.7 | 3 | 5.7 | ~~9~~ | ~~15.0~~ | 9 | 15.0 | 11 | 17.0 | 4 | 8.0 | 8 | 14.0 | 80.4 | 63.4 |
| 7 | Larry Woods (CAN) | Michael de la Roche | 6 | 11.7 | ~~11~~ | ~~17.0~~ | 4 | 8.0 | 8 | 14.0 | 7 | 13.0 | 7 | 13.0 | 5 | 10.0 | 86.7 | 69.7 |
| 8 | Franco Pivoli (ITA) | Cesare Biagi | 5 | 10.0 | 4 | 8.0 | 12 | 18.0 | 5 | 10.0 | 6 | 11.7 | 8 | 14.0 | ~~DSQ~~ | ~~21.0~~ | 92.7 | 71.7 |
| 9 | Peter Due (DEN) | Per Kjaergaard | 4 | 8.0 | 5 | 10.0 | ~~13~~ | ~~19.0~~ | 3 | 5.7 | 12 | 18.0 | 11 | 17.0 | 10 | 16.0 | 93.7 | 74.7 |
| 10 | Chris de Cazenove (FRA) | Bruno de Cazenove | 7 | 13.0 | 9 | 15.0 | 7 | 13.0 | ~~11~~ | ~~17.0~~ | 8 | 14.0 | 5 | 10.0 | 6 | 11.7 | 93.7 | 76.7 |
| 11 | Hans Prack (AUT) | Bernhard Prack | ~~10~~ | ~~16.0~~ | 8 | 14.0 | 6 | 11.7 | 10 | 16.0 | 3 | 5.7 | 10 | 16.0 | 9 | 15.0 | 94.4 | 78.4 |
| 12 | Vladimir Vassiliev (URS) | Vyacheslav Tineyev | 11 | 17.0 | 12 | 18.0 | 8 | 14.0 | ~~13~~ | ~~19.0~~ | 10 | 16.0 | 13 | 19.0 | 7 | 13.0 | 116.0 | 97.0 |
| 13 | Pekka Narko (FIN) | Juha Siira | 12 | 18.0 | RET | 20.0 | 10 | 16.0 | 6 | 11.7 | 14 | 20.0 | 9 | 15.0 | ~~DSQ~~ | ~~21.0~~ | 121.7 | 100.7 |
| 14 | Chris Stater (PUR) | Richard Darmanin | 13 | 19.0 | 13 | 19.0 | ~~14~~ | ~~20.0~~ | 14 | 20.0 | 13 | 19.0 | 14 | 20.0 | 11 | 17.0 | 134.0 | 114.0 |

DNF = Did Not Finish, DNS= Did Not Start, DSQ = Disqualified, PMS = Premature Start, YMP = Yacht Materially Prejudiced
= Male, = Female

=== Daily standings ===
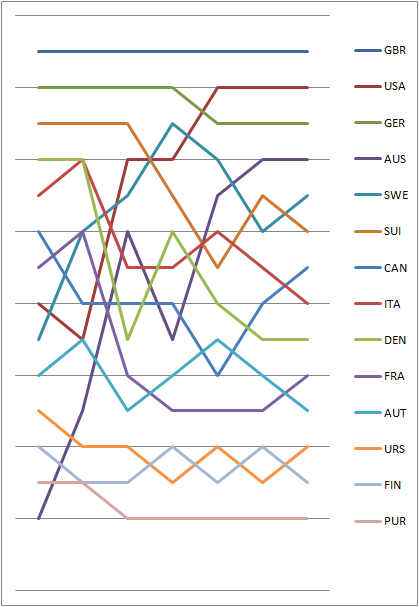
Graph showing the daily standings in the Tornado during the 1976 Summer Olympics
