= Abdul Omar =

Abdul Omar may refer to:

- Abdul Omar (boxer) (born 1993), Ghanaian boxer
- Abdul Rahman Omar (born 1945), Kenyan sport shooter
