= Kustermann =

Kustermann or Küstermann is a German surname. Notable people with the surname include:

- Gottfried Kustermann (1943–2023), German sports shooter
- Gustav Küstermann (1850–1919), German-American politician
