= Walter Steiner (disambiguation) =

Walter Steiner may refer to:

- Walter Steiner (born 1951), Swiss ski jumper
- Walter Steiner (rower) (1946–2020), Swiss rower
- Walter Steiner (sailor) (born 1946), Swiss sailor
