= Gilberto Fernández =

Gilberto Fernández may refer to:

- Gilberto Fernández (sport shooter) (born 1933), Colombian sports shooter
- Gilberto Fernández (bishop) (1935-2011), Cuban bishop

== See also ==
- Gilberto Hernández (disambiguation)
