= Papava =

Papava (Georgian: პაპავა) is a Georgian surname. Notable people with the surname include:

- Giorgi Papava (born 1993), Georgian football player
- Marlen Papava (1941–2010), Soviet sports shooter
- Vladimer Papava (born 1955), Georgian scientist

== Scientific ==
- Papava (insect), a genus of crickets in the tribe Landrevini
