= Marlies Ray =

East German sport shooter

Personal information
- Born: Marlies Kanthak; 10 January 1958 (age 68) Torgau, Saxony, East Germany
- Spouse(s): Hans-Jürgen Helbig (m. 1978) Eugen Ray (m. 1984; died 1986)

Sport
- Sport: Shooting
- Club: GST-Club Leipzig
Medal record
Shooting
Representing East Germany
Friendship Games
Gold medal – first place	1984 Moscow	10 m air rifle
Bronze medal – third place	1984 Moscow	50 m rifle three positions

Marlies Ray (née Kanthak, then Helbig, born 10 January 1958) is a retired sport shooter from East Germany. She was twice world champion.

== Shooting career ==
Kanthak was born in 1958 in Torgau, Saxony; at the time located in East Germany. The leader of her school choir in the nearby Arzberg, Klaus Müller, was also a trainer in sport shooting and she was asked, aged 12 or 13, to come along to a shooting session where her talent was discovered. Competing for Gesellschaft für Sport und Technik (GST)-Club Leipzig, her first international competition was in 1974 in Thun, Switzerland. Competing as a 16-year-old (the youngest of the approximately 1000 competitors), she came fourth at the 1974 World Championships in the women's 50 m rifle three positions. At the 1975 European Championships in Sofia, she won silver behind Anka Pelova in the 50 m rifle three positions, and won gold in the 60 m lying position. Her strong performance was the main reason for the East German women to win the team competition.

At the 1976 European 10 m Events Championships in Paris, France, in February 1976, Kanthak came third in the mixed event and became European champion with the junior team. Kanthak went to the 1976 Summer Olympics in Montreal, Canada, where she was so nervous that she couldn't see the target properly. In the mixed 50 metre rifle three positions she came 32nd, and in the mixed 50 metre rifle prone she was 51st. At the 1976 European Championships in Skopje, Yugoslavia, Kanthak was again beaten by Pelova in the 50 m rifle three positions event, but the GDR women won gold as a team. Their result of 1,772 rings set a new world record. In the 50 m rifle prone event, Kanthak showed poor form and came fifth as an individual but won silver with the team.

At the February 1977 European Championships held at Les Escaldes, Andorra, where competitions were held in air gun disciplines, Kanthak won silver with the air rifle and gold with the women's team. At the September 1977 European Championships in Bucharest, Romania, Kanthak did not place among the top ten in the mixed 50 meter rifle prone event but was the highest-placed competitor from East Germany. At the October 1977 European Championships for women and juniors in Rome, Italy, Kanthak won three gold medals: in the 50 meter rifle prone event, the 50 m rifle three positions event, and in the latter discipline also with the women's team. In the 50 m rifle three positions event, she improved Pelova's 1975 world record by two rings to 582 points. For her success, she was awarded the Ernst Schneller Medal in gold in December 1977, the highest award given out by the Gesellschaft für Sport und Technik.

At the February 1978 European Championships held at Copenhagen, Denmark, where competitions were held in air gun disciplines, Kanthak came seventh in the individual air rifle competition, and won silver with the team in that event. She competed under her married name Helbig at the 1978 European Championships for women and juniors in Hämeenlinna, Finland, in the 50 metre rifle three positions event and won a silver medal.

At the March 1979 European Championships held at Graz, Austria, where competitions were held in air gun disciplines, Helbig won a bronze medal in the individual air rifle competition, and silver with the team in that event. At an international competition in Suhl, East Germany, Helbig equalled her 1977 world record in the 50 m rifle three positions event.

In April 1979, the International Olympic Committee (IOC) decided that women would first compete in their own shooting events in the 1984 Summer Olympics. As women were outperformed by men, East Germany did not nominate any women for the 1980 Summer Olympics.

As the Eastern Bloc boycotted the 1984 Summer Olympics, Ray competed at the Friendship Games in Moscow instead. She won a bronze medal in the 10 metre air rifle event and won gold in the 50 metre rifle three positions event. Immediately afterwards, she was awarded a Patriotic Order of Merit in gold.

Ray intended to temporarily retire in 1985 when she became pregnant. Her aim was to restart her shooting career so that she could compete at the 1986 World Championships in her home country held at Suhl, but her husband died during her pregnancy and she did not get back to shooting. At GST-Club Leipzig, she had been trained by Helga Börners, Gerda Voß, and Herbert Golla. Ray won more than 30 individual national championships during her career.

Ray was a judge at the shooting competition at the 1992 Summer Olympics in Barcelona, Spain.

== Private life ==
In 1978, she married fellow sport shooter Hans-Jürgen Helbig. Her husband would compete at the 1980 Summer Olympics where he came 8th in the mixed 50 metre running target. In 1978 and 1979, she was referred to in the media as Marlies Helbig-Kanthak, and during 1980 either by this double-barrel name or as Marlies Helbig. From 1981, she was exclusively referred to under her husband's name only.

In 1984, she married Eugen Ray. Her second husband had gone to the 1980 Summer Olympics as a sprinter and had, in the 1982/83 season, unsuccessfully tried his luck as a bobsledder. The first mention of her new surname appeared in August 1984, and she was mostly referred to as Marlies Ray-Helbig for the rest of 1984, and mostly as Marlies Ray during 1985. Her husband, who worked for the Police, died in a traffic crash while driving a police car on 18 January 1986. She was pregnant at the time and their son, who was to be named after his father, was born in June 1986.

She studied clinical psychology. She lives in Wermsdorf and has been self-employed as a psychotherapist in Döbeln since 2007.
