= Pál Katkó =

Hungarian sports shooter

Personal information
- Born: 21 November 1938 (age 87) Salgótarján, Hungary
- Died: 18 April 2008 (aged 69)

Sport
- Sport: Sports shooting

Pál Katkó (21 November 1938 – 18 April 2008) was a Hungarian sports shooter. He placed 20th in the 50 metre pistol event at the 1972 Summer Olympics.
