= Michael de la Roche (sailor) =

Canadian sailor

Personal information
- Born: 19 October 1954 (age 72) Quebec City, Quebec, Canada

Sport
- Sport: Sailing

Michael de la Roche (born 19 October 1954) is a Canadian sailor. He competed in the Tornado event at the 1976 Summer Olympics.
