= Severino Requejo =

Spanish sports shooter

Personal information
- Born: 5 September 1941
- Died: 2 April 2012 (aged 70)

Sport
- Sport: Sports shooting

Severino Requejo (5 September 1941 – 2 April 2012) was a Spanish sports shooter. He competed in the 50 metre pistol event at the 1972 Summer Olympics.
