= Roman Burkard =

Swiss sports shooter

Personal information
- Nationality: Swiss
- Born: 27 April 1940 (age 84)

Sport
- Sport: Sports shooting

Roman Burkard (born 27 April 1940) is a Swiss sports shooter. He competed in the men's 50 metre free pistol event at the 1976 Summer Olympics.
