= André Zoltan =

Belgian sports shooter (born 1945)

Personal information
- Born: 2 January 1945 (age 81) Uccle, Belgium

Sport
- Sport: Sports shooting

André Zoltan (born 2 January 1945) is a Belgian former sports shooter. He competed in the 50 metre pistol event at the 1972 Summer Olympics.
