= Petar Bajić =

Yugoslav sports shooter (1934–2013)

Personal information
- Born: 8 July 1934
- Died: March 2013 (aged 78)

Sport
- Sport: Sports shooting

Petar Bajić (8 July 1934 – March 2013) was a Yugoslav sports shooter. He competed in the 50 metre pistol event at the 1972 Summer Olympics.
