= Jonathan Gillman =

Australian sports shooter

Personal information
- Full name: John Ernest Gillman
- Nationality: Australian
- Born: 7 February 1935 Kerang, Victoria, Australia
- Died: 12 August 2007 (aged 72)

Sport
- Sport: Sports shooting

Jonathan Ernest "John" Gillman (7 February 1935 – 12 August 2007) was an Australian sports shooter. He competed in the men's 50 metre free pistol event at the 1976 Summer Olympics.
