= John Waight =

Belizean sport shooter

Personal information
- Nationality: Belize
- Born: 2 November 1945
- Height: 172 cm (5 ft 8 in)
- Weight: 57 kg (126 lb)

Sport
- Sport: Shooting

John Waight (2 November 1945) is a former sports shooter, who represented Belize at the 1976 Summer Olympics.

Waight competed in the mixed 50 metre free pistol event at the 1976 Summer Olympics in Montreal, and after scoring 419 points he finished in 47th place.
