= Juventino Sánchez =

Mexican sports shooter

Personal information
- Born: 25 January 1945 (age 81)

Sport
- Sport: Sports shooting

Juventino Sánchez (born 25 January 1945) is a Mexican former sports shooter. He competed in the 50 metre pistol event at the 1972 Summer Olympics.
