= José Álvarez (Virgin Islands sport shooter) =

US Virgin Islands sports shooter (1926–2021)

Personal information
- Born: 15 October 1926 Havana, Cuba
- Died: 2 November 2021 (aged 95)

Sport
- Sport: Sports shooting

José Álvarez (15 October 1926 – 2 November 2021) was a sports shooter from the United States Virgin Islands. He competed in the 50 metre pistol event at the 1972 Summer Olympics.
