= Larry Woods (sailor) =

Canadian sailor

Personal information
- Born: 2 August 1939 Hamilton, Ontario, Canada
- Died: 26 January 2016 (aged 76)

Sport
- Sport: Sailing

Larry Woods (2 August 1939 – 26 January 2016) was a Canadian sailor. He competed in the Tornado event at the 1976 Summer Olympics.
