= André Porthault =

French sports shooter

Personal information
- Nationality: French
- Born: 17 August 1941 (age 83)

Sport
- Sport: Sports shooting

André Porthault (born 17 August 1941) is a French sports shooter. He competed in the men's 50 metre free pistol event at the 1976 Summer Olympics.
