= Johnny Cannizzaro (sport shooter) =

Puerto Rican sports shooter

Personal information
- Nationality: Puerto Rican
- Born: 21 June 1949 (age 75)

Sport
- Sport: Sports shooting

Johnny Cannizzaro (born 21 June 1949) is a Puerto Rican sports shooter. He competed in the men's 50 metre free pistol event at the 1976 Summer Olympics.
