= Franco Pivoli =

Italian sailor

Personal information
- Nationality: Italian
- Born: 11 September 1948 (age 76); Milan, Italy

Sport
- Sport: Sailing

Franco Pivoli (born 11 September 1948) is an Italian sailor. He competed in the Tornado event at the 1976 Summer Olympics.
