= Bruno de Cazenove =

French sailor

Personal information
- Nationality: French
- Born: 7 February 1952 (age 73)

Sport
- Sport: Sailing

Bruno de Cazenove (born 7 February 1952) is a French sailor. He competed in the Tornado event at the 1976 Summer Olympics.
