= Vyacheslav Tineyev =

Soviet sailor (1933–2013)

Personal information
- Nationality: Soviet
- Born: 1 May 1933; Kaluga, Russia
- Died: 20 May 2013 (aged 80)

Sport
- Sport: Sailing

Vyacheslav Tineyev (1 May 1933 – 20 May 2013) was a Soviet sailor. He competed in the Tornado event at the 1976 Summer Olympics. Tineyev died on 20 May 2013, at the age of 80.
