= Santiago Machuca =

Puerto Rican sports shooter

Personal information
- Born: 21 February 1929 Guaynabo, Puerto Rico
- Died: 26 August 2024 (aged 95) Floresville, Texas, U.S.

Sport
- Sport: Sports shooting

Santiago Machuca (21 February 1929 – 26 August 2024) was a Puerto Rican sports shooter. He competed in the 50 metre pistol event at the 1972 Summer Olympics.
