= Jorge Henao (sport shooter) =

Colombian sport shooter

Personal information
- Born: 25 November 1941 (age 84)

Sport
- Sport: Sports shooting

Jorge Henao (born 25 November 1941) is a Colombian former sports shooter. He competed in the 50 metre pistol event at the 1972 Summer Olympics.
