= Anne Grethe Jeppesen =

Norwegian sport shooter (born 1957)

Personal information
- Nationality: Norwegian
- Born: 1 November 1957 (age 68) Florø, Norway
- Spouse: Harald Stenvaag

Sport
- Sport: Shooting
Medal record
World Championships
Silver medal – second place	1981 Santo Domingo	air rifle team
European Championships
Gold medal – first place	1981 Athens	10 m air rifle

Anne Grethe Jeppesen (born 1 November 1957) is a Norwegian retired sports shooter and coach.

Her achievements include medals in rifle shooting at world and European championships, a fifth place at the Olympics, and seventeen individual national titles. She has coached the Norwegian, Scottish and Danish national rifle shooting teams.

== Career ==
=== Personal life ===
Born in Florø on 1 November 1957, Jeppesen is married to sports shooter, world champion and Olympic medalist Harald Stenvaag. Both her father and grandfather were sports shooters as well, and her father began taking her to competitions at a young age. She took up the sport herself when she was 11, though she at first struggled with the idea that a girl could be involved in competitive shooting.

=== Shooting career ===
Her first international competition was the 1976 European 10 m Championships, where she met her future husband.

She competed at the 1984 Summer Olympics in Los Angeles, where she placed fifth in the 50 metres small-bore rifle (three positions), and tied 11th in the 10 metre air rifle.

A Nordic champion in air rifle in 1979 and 1981, Jeppesen won a gold medal in 10 m air rifle at the 1981 European 10 m Events Championships in Athens. The next time this gold went to a woman from Norway was over four decades later, when Jeanette Hegg Duestad won in 2023. In 1981, she also won a team silver medal at the ISSF air rifle World Championships, Women Team.

She won a total of 17 individual national titles.

=== Coaching career ===
After her active career, Jeppesen coached the Norwegian national shooting teams over several periods, and was head coach for the senior team until 2016. She later coached the Scottish national rifle team from 2016, and the Danish national rifle team from 2018.

Her publications include Mental trening i skyting from 2005, co-written with Anne Marie Pensgaard and published as Mental Training in Shooting in English in 2006.
