= Dimitrios Kotronis =

Greek sports shooter

Personal information
- Born: 6 April 1932 (age 94)

Sport
- Sport: Sports shooting

Dimitrios Kotronis (born 6 April 1932) is a Greek former sports shooter. He competed in the 50 metre pistol event at the 1972 Summer Olympics.
