= Gérard Denecheau =

French sports shooter

Personal information
- Born: 29 March 1939
- Died: 20 October 2010 (aged 71)

Sport
- Sport: Sports shooting

Gérard Denecheau (29 March 1939 – 20 October 2010) was a French sports shooter. He competed in the 50 metre pistol event at the 1972 Summer Olympics.
