= Juan Casey =

Argentine sports shooter (1937–2018)

Personal information
- Born: 18 July 1937; Alberti, Argentina
- Died: October 25, 2018 (aged 81)

Sport
- Sport: Sports shooting

Juan Eduardo Casey y Recondo (18 July 1937 – 25 October 2018) was an Argentine sports shooter. He competed in the men's 50 metre free pistol event at the 1976 Summer Olympics. He was of Irish descent and began competitively shooting at the age of 23 after competing at the Tiro Federal de Junín in Buenos Aires. Casey died on October 25, 2018, at the age of 81.
