= Enzo Contegno =

Italian sports shooter

Personal information
- Nationality: Italian
- Born: 9 November 1927; Lecce, Italy
- Died: 8 September 1984 (aged 56); Lecce, Italy

Sport
- Sport: Sports shooting

Enzo Contegno (9 November 1927 – 8 September 1984) was an Italian sports shooter. He competed in the men's 50 metre free pistol event at the 1976 Summer Olympics.
