= Richard Crawford (sport shooter) =

American sports shooter (born 1934)

Personal information
- Nationality: American
- Born: November 6, 1934 (age 91) Mount Vernon, New York, U.S.

Sport
- Sport: Sports shooting

Richard Arthur Crawford (born November 6, 1934) is an American sports shooter. He competed in the men's 50 metre free pistol event at the 1976 Summer Olympics.
