= Richard Darmanin =

Puerto Rican sailor

Personal information
- Nationality: Puerto Rican
- Born: 1 March 1956 (age 70)

Sport
- Sport: Sailing

Richard Darmanin (born 1 March 1956) is a Puerto Rican sailor. He competed in the Tornado event at the 1976 Summer Olympics.
