= Javier Padilla =

Mexican sports shooter (1930–2011)

Personal information
- Born: 12 July 1930 León, Guanajuato, Mexico
- Died: 21 August 2011 (aged 81)

Sport
- Sport: Sports shooting

Javier Padilla Olivares (Note: In this Spanish name, the first or paternal surname is Padilla and the second or maternal family name is Olivares.) (12 July 1930 – 21 August 2011) was a Mexican sports shooter. He competed in the men's 50 metre free pistol event at the 1976 Summer Olympics. Padilla died on 21 August 2011, at the age of 81.
