= Albert Schiess =

Swiss sailor

Personal information
- Nationality: Swiss
- Born: 12 March 1951 (age 74)
- Height: 189 cm (6 ft 2 in)
- Weight: 76 kg (168 lb)

Sport
- Sport: Sailing

Albert Schiess (born 12 March 1951) is a Swiss sailor. He competed in the Tornado event at the 1976 Summer Olympics.
