= Seppo Irjala =

Finnish sports shooter

Personal information
- Full name: Seppo Juhani Irjala
- Born: 2 December 1937 Oulu, Finland
- Died: 7 September 2004 (aged 66)

Sport
- Sport: Sports shooting

Seppo Juhani Irjala (2 December 1937 – 7 September 2004) was a Finnish sports shooter. He competed in the 50 metre pistol event at the 1972 Summer Olympics.
