= Camilo Pedro =

Hong Kong sports shooter

Personal information
- Nationality: Hong Konger
- Born: 3 August 1932 (age 92)

Sport
- Sport: Sports shooting

Camilo Pedro (born 3 August 1932) is a Hong Kong sports shooter. He competed in the men's 50 metre free pistol event at the 1976 Summer Olympics.
