= Gilberto Hernández =

Gilberto Hernández may refer to:

- Gilberto Hernández Ortega (1923-1979), Dominican painter
- Gilbert Hernandez (born 1957), American cartoonist
- Gilberto Hernández Guerrero (born 1970), Mexican chess grandmaster
- Gilberto Hernández (footballer) (1997-2023), Panamanian footballer

== See also ==
- Gilberto Fernández (disambiguation)
