= Chris Stater =

Puerto Rican sailor

Personal information
- Nationality: Puerto Rican
- Born: 15 April 1955 (age 69)

Sport
- Sport: Sailing

Chris Stater (born 15 April 1955) is a Puerto Rican sailor. He competed in the Tornado event at the 1976 Summer Olympics.
