= Cesare Biagi =

Italian sailor

Personal information
- Nationality: Italian
- Born: 1 February 1932; Milan, Italy
- Died: 29 April 2009 (aged 77)

Sport
- Sport: Sailing

Cesare Biagi (1 February 1932 – 29 April 2009) was an Italian sailor. He competed in the Tornado event at the 1976 Summer Olympics.
