= Sven-Bertil Johansson =

Swedish sailor

Personal information
- Nationality: Swedish
- Born: 1 October 1956 (age 68); Gothenburg, Sweden

Sport
- Sport: Sailing

Sven-Bertil Johansson (born 1 October 1956) is a Swedish sailor. He competed in the Tornado event at the 1976 Summer Olympics.
