= Chris de Cazenove =

French sailor

Personal information
- Nationality: French
- Born: 14 October 1950 (age 74)

Sport
- Sport: Sailing

Chris de Cazenove (born 14 October 1950) is a French sailor. He competed in the Tornado event at the 1976 Summer Olympics.
