= Akin Ersoy =

Turkish sports shooter

Personal information
- Nationality: Turkish
- Born: 5 June 1945 (age 79); Istanbul, Turkey

Sport
- Sport: Sports shooting

Akin Ersoy (born 5 June 1945) is a Turkish sports shooter. He competed in the men's 50 metre free pistol event at the 1976 Summer Olympics.
