= Odette Meuter =

Belgian sports shooter

Personal information
- Nationality: Belgian
- Born: 13 July 1938 (age 86); Haine-Saint-Paul, Belgium

Sport
- Sport: Sports shooting

Odette Meuter (born 13 July 1938) is a Belgian sports shooter. She competed at the 1976 Summer Olympics and the 1980 Summer Olympics.
