= Jessie Kaps =

Belgian sports shooter (born 1998)

Personal information
- Nationality: Belgian
- Born: 17 February 1998 (age 28) Tongeren, Belgium

Sport
- Sport: Sports shooting
Medal record
Women's shooting
Representing Belgium
European Championships
Silver medal – second place	2021 Osijek	10 m air rifle
Bronze medal – third place	2022 Hamar	10 m air rifle

Jessie Kaps (born 17 February 1998) is a Belgian sports shooter. She competed in the women's 10 metre air rifle event at the 2020 Summer Olympics.
