= Gilberto Fernández (sport shooter) =

Colombian sports shooter

Personal information
- Born: 10 March 1933 (age 93)

Sport
- Sport: Sports shooting

Gilberto Fernández (born 10 March 1933) is a Colombian former sports shooter. He competed in the 50 metre pistol event at the 1972 Summer Olympics.
