= Walter Steiner (sailor) =

Swiss sailor (born 1946)

Personal information
- Nationality: Swiss
- Born: 23 September 1946 (age 78)

Sport
- Sport: Sailing

Walter Steiner (born 23 September 1946) is a Swiss sailor. He competed in the Tornado event at the 1976 Summer Olympics.
