= Anton Gourianov =

Russian sport shooter (born 1979)

Personal information
- Nationality: Russian
- Born: 12 December 1979 (age 46) Rostov-on-Don, Russia
- Height: 1.72 m (5 ft 8 in)
- Weight: 62 kg (137 lb)

Sport
- Country: Russia
- Sport: Shooting
- Event: Air pistol
- Club: CSKA
Medal record
World Championships
| Bronze medal – third place | 2018 Changwon | 10 m team air pistol |

Anton Gourianov (born 12 December 1979) is a Russian sport shooter.

He participated at the 2018 ISSF World Shooting Championships, winning a medal.
