= Hanna Etula =

Finnish sport shooter

Personal information
- Nationality: Finland
- Born: 30 March 1981 (age 45) Pirkkala, Finland
- Height: 1.74 m (5 ft 8 1/2 in)
- Weight: 61 kg (134 lb)

Sport
- Sport: Shooting
- Event(s): 10 m air rifle (AR40); 50 m rifle 3 positions (STR3X20)
- Club: Lahden Ampumaseura
- Coached by: Tero Hovila

Hanna Etula (born 30 March 1981 in Pirkkala) is a Finnish sport shooter. She is also a member of Lahden Ampumaseura, a local shooting club in Lahti, and is currently coached and trained by Tero Hovila.

Etula represented Finland at the 2008 Summer Olympics in Beijing, where she competed for two rifle shooting events. She placed twenty-first out of forty-seven shooters in the women's 10 m air rifle, with a total score of 394 points. Nearly a week later, Etula competed for her second event, 50 m rifle 3 positions, where she was able to shoot 196 targets in a prone position, 191 in standing, and 190 in kneeling, for a total score of 577 points, finishing only in twenty-fourth place.
