= Kirsten Obel =

German sport shooter (born 1967)

Kirsten Obel (born 23 January 1967) is a German sport shooter who competed in the 1996 Summer Olympics.
