= Pekka Narko =

Finnish sailor

Personal information
- Nationality: Finnish
- Born: 20 September 1945 (age 79); Tuusula, Finland

Sport
- Sport: Sailing

Pekka Narko (born 20 September 1945) is a Finnish sailor. He competed at the 1976 Summer Olympics, the 1980 Summer Olympics, and the 1984 Summer Olympics.
