= Olympia-Schießanlage =

Firing range in Munich, Germany

Coordinates: 48.2320°N 11.6018°E

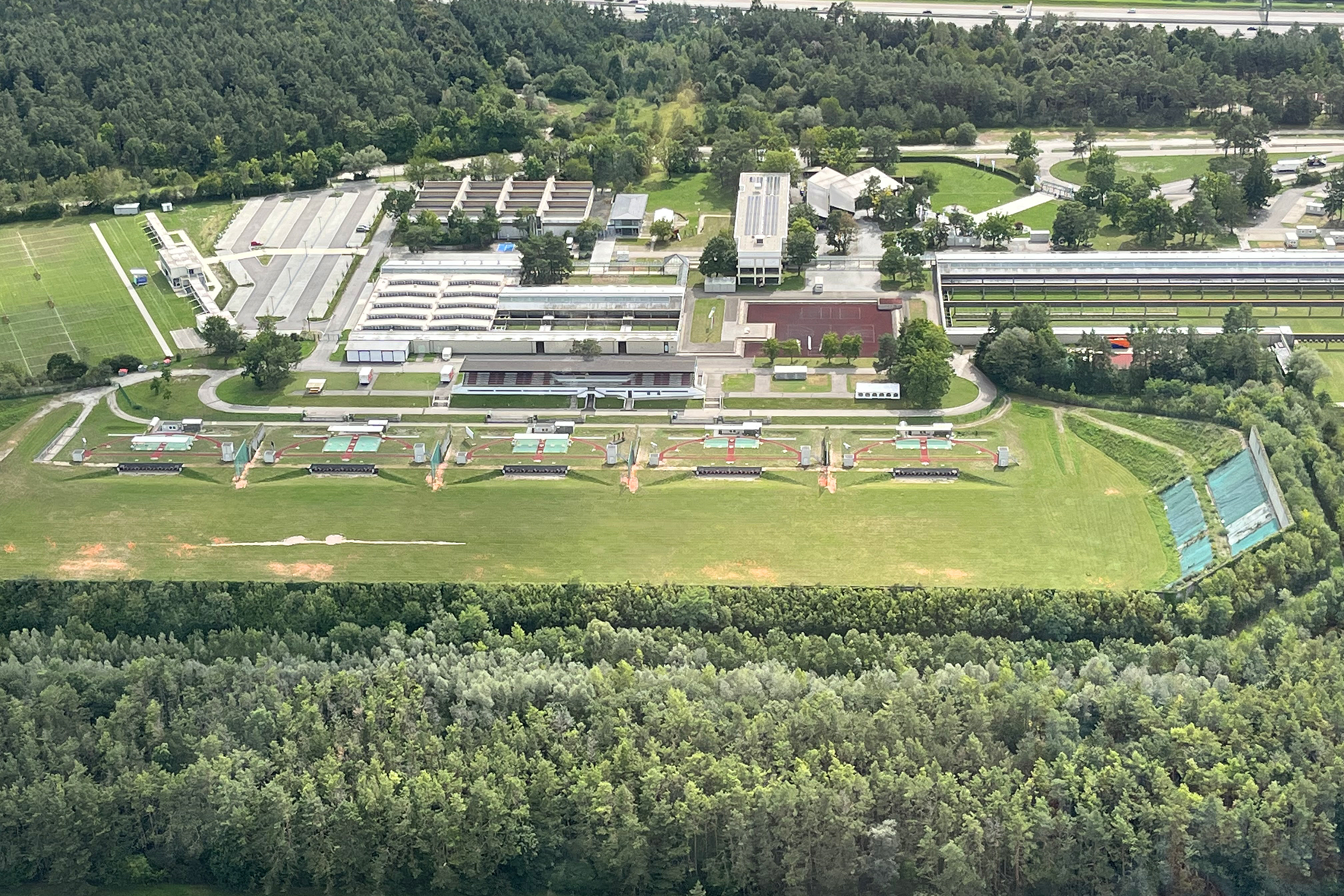
Aerial photo of the shooting range

Olympia-Schießanlage is a firing range located in the Hochbrück area of Munich, Germany. For the 1972 Summer Olympics, it hosted the shooting and the shooting part of the modern pentathlon competition.

The total acreage used for the events was 240,000 square meters.

It served as the venue for the 2010 ISSF World Shooting Championships.
