= Sirpa Ylönen =

Finnish sport shooter (1957–2025)

Personal information
- Full name: Sirpa Liisa Hannele Ylönen
- Nationality: Finnish
- Born: 15 June 1957; Mikkeli, Finland
- Died: 26 January 2025 (aged 67)

Sport
- Sport: Sports shooting

Sirpa Ylönen (15 June 1957 – 26 January 2025) was a Finnish sport shooter. She was born in Mikkeli. She competed in rifle shooting events at the 1984 Summer Olympics and the 1988 Summer Olympics.

== Olympic results ==
Event	1984	1988
10 metre air rifle (women)	8th	T-41st
50 metre rifle three positions (women)	T-12th	27th
