= Selma Sonnet =

West German sport shooter

Personal information
- Nationality: West German
- Born: 17 January 1968 (age 57); Bad Kreuznach, West Germany

Sport
- Sport: Sports shooting

Selma Sonnet (born 17 January 1968 in Bad Kreuznach) is a West German sport shooter. She competed in rifle shooting events at the 1988 Summer Olympics.

== Olympic results ==
Event	1988
50 metre rifle three positions (women)	T-11th
