= Mendbayaryn Jantsankhorloo =

Mongolian sports shooter (born 1944)

Personal information
- Born: 15 March 1944 (age 82)

Sport
- Sport: Sports shooting

Mendbayaryn Jantsankhorloo (Mongolian: Мэндбаярын Жанцанхорлоо; born 15 March 1944) is a Mongolian former sports shooter. He competed at the 1968, 1972, 1976 and the 1980 Summer Olympics.
