= Ermira Dingu =

Albanian sport shooter

Sport
- Sport: Shooting
Medal record
European Championships
Gold medal – first place	1980 Madrid	50m rifle prone women
- Updated on 25 August 2015

Ermira Dingu is an Albanian shooter who represented her country in the 50m rifle prone women in the 1980 European Shooting Championships and became European Champion in the event. 6 years earlier, in 1974, she had been 6th in the World Championship, in the same event.
