= Sławomir Romanowski =

Polish sports shooter

Personal information
- Nationality: Polish
- Born: 25 April 1957 (age 67); Łódź, Poland

Sport
- Sport: Sports shooting

Sławomir Romanowski (born 25 April 1957) is a Polish sports shooter. He competed in the men's 50 metre free pistol event at the 1976 Summer Olympics.
