= Marlen Papava =

Soviet sports shooter

Personal information
- Nationality: Soviet
- Born: 23 April 1941 Sukhumi, Soviet Union
- Died: 19 April 2010 (aged 68)

Sport
- Sport: Sports shooting

Marlen Papava (23 April 1941 - 19 April 2010) was a Soviet sports shooter. He competed in the men's 50 metre free pistol event at the 1976 Summer Olympics.
