= Franz Schitzhofer =

Austrian sports shooter

Personal information
- Full name: Franz G. Schitzhofer
- Born: 28 October 1958 (age 67) Vienna, Austria

Sport
- Sport: Sports shooting
- Event: Skeet

Franz Schitzhofer (born 28 October 1958) is an Austrian sports shooter. He competed at the 1976 Summer Olympics and the 1980 Summer Olympics.
