= Hans Prack =

Austrian sailor

Personal information
- Nationality: Austrian
- Born: 4 August 1943 (age 81); Salzburg, Nazi Germany

Sport
- Sport: Sailing

Hans Prack (born 4 August 1943) is an Austrian sailor. He competed in the Tornado event at the 1976 Summer Olympics.
