= Elizabeta Karabolli =

Albanian-American sport shooter

Sport
- Sport: Shooting
- Club: Partizani Tirana
Medal record
European Championships
Bronze medal – third place	1977 Rome	25m Pistol Women
Silver medal – second place	1978 Hämeenlinna	25m Pistol Women
Gold medal – first place	1979 Frankfurt	25m Pistol Women
Silver medal – second place	1979 Frankfurt	25m Pistol Women Team
Bronze medal – third place	1981 Titograd	25m Pistol Women Team
- Updated on 25 August 2015

Elisabeta Karabolli (Karabolli was her maiden name, her married name is Elisabeta Nishica), born 1958, is an Albanian-American sport shooter, who became the European Champion in air pistol, representing Albania. She was the first ever European champion from Albania in any sport.

== Sports career ==
She competed in the European Championship three times doing successively better each time. In 1977 she took home the Bronze Medal from Rome, Italy. In 1978 she won the silver medal at the championships held at Hämeenlinna, Finland, and in 1979 she became the first Albanian to win a European Championship in pistol shooting when she took home the Gold Medal from Frankfurt am Main, Germany.

Naturalized as US citizen, and at the age of 50, Karabolli won the U.S. title in 2008 in the Women's Sport Pistol event.
