= Abdul Rahman Omar =

Kenyan sports shooter (born 1945)

Personal information
- Born: 31 August 1945 (age 80)

Sport
- Sport: Sports shooting

Abdul Rahman Omar (born 31 August 1945) is a Kenyan former sports shooter. He competed in the 50 metre pistol event at the 1972 Summer Olympics.
