= Bernhard Prack =

Austrian sailor

Personal information
- Nationality: Austrian
- Born: 22 August 1946 (age 78); Salzburg, Austria

Sport
- Sport: Sailing

Bernhard Prack (born 22 August 1946) is an Austrian sailor. He competed in the Tornado event at the 1976 Summer Olympics.
