= Jasminka Francki =

Croatian sports shooter

Personal information
- Nationality: Croatian
- Born: 15 February 1969 (age 56); Zagreb, Croatia

Sport
- Sport: Sports shooting

Jasminka Francki (born on 15 February 1969 in Zagreb) is a Croatian sport shooter. She competed in rifle shooting events at the 1992 Summer Olympics.

== Olympic results ==
Event	1992
10 metre air rifle (women)	T-15th
50 metre rifle three positions (women)	T-12th
