= Anna Malukhina =

Russian sport shooter

Personal information
- Native name: Анна Ивановна Малухина (Малахова-)
- Full name: Anna Ivanovna Malukhina (Malakhova-)
- Born: 21 December 1958 (age 67) Moscow, Russia, USSR
- Height: 162 cm (5 ft 4 in)
- Weight: 60 kg (132 lb)
Medal record
Shooting
Representing Soviet Union
Bronze medal – third place	1988 Seoul	10 metre air rifle
- Updated on 12 September 2015

Anna Ivanovna Malukhina (Russian: Анна Ивановна Малухина, born 21 December 1958) is a former Soviet sport shooter. She won a bronze medal in the 10 metre air rifle event at the 1988 Summer Olympics in Seoul.
