= Hans-Jürgen Helbig =

German sports shooter

Personal information
- Nationality: East German
- Born: 25 November 1955 (age 70) Altenburg, East Germany

Sport
- Sport: Sports shooting

Hans-Jürgen Helbig (born 25 November 1955) is a former East German sports shooter. He competed in the mixed 50 metre running target event at the 1980 Summer Olympics.
