= Paweł Małek =

Polish sports shooter (1933–2019)

Personal information
- Born: 11 May 1933 Wał-Ruda, Poland
- Died: 25 January 2019 (aged 85)

Sport
- Sport: Sports shooting

Paweł Małek (11 May 1933 – 25 January 2019) was a Polish sports shooter. He competed in the 50 metre pistol event at the 1968 Summer Olympics.
