= Harald Vollmar =

German sport shooter

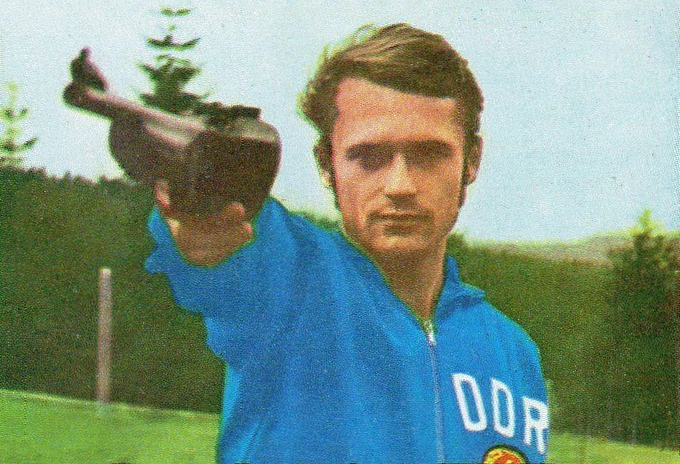

Personal information
- Born: 24 April 1947 (age 79) Bad Frankenhausen, Soviet occupation zone of Germany
- Height: 177 cm (5 ft 10 in)
- Weight: 72 kg (159 lb)

Sport
- Sport: Sports shooting
- Event: Pistol
- Club: GST-Klub Leipzig
Medal record
Representing East Germany
Olympic Games
Bronze medal – third place	1968 Mexico City	50 m pistol, ind.
Silver medal – second place	1976 Montreal	50 m pistol, ind.
Silver medal – second place	1980 Moscow	50 m pistol, ind.
World Championships
Gold medal – first place	1970 Phoenix	50 m pistol, ind.
Silver medal – second place	1970 Phoenix	50 m pistol, team
Bronze medal – third place	1970 Phoenix	10 m air pistol, ind.
Bronze medal – third place	1974 Thun	10 m air pistol, team
Bronze medal – third place	1974 Thun	50 m pistol, ind.

Harald Vollmar (born 24 April 1947) is a retired East German pistol shooter. He competed in the individual 50 m event at the 1968, 1972, 1976 and 1980 Olympics and won two silver and one bronze medal, placing fifth in 1972. Between 1976 and 1979 he held the world record in the 10 meter air pistol.
