= Vesela Letcheva =

Bulgarian sport shooter

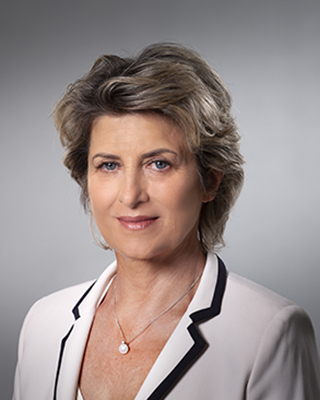

Personal information
- Full name: Vesela Nikolaeva Lecheva
- Born: May 20, 1964 (age 62) Veliko Tarnovo, Bulgaria
Medal record
Women's shooting
Representing Bulgaria
Olympic Games
Silver medal – second place	1988 Seoul	50 m rifle 3 positions
Silver medal – second place	1992 Barcelona	10 m air rifle

Vessela Nikolaeva Letcheva (Bulgarian: Весела Николаева Лечева; born 20 May 1964) was born in Veliko Tarnovo and lives in Sofia. She is a shooting sport athlete, president of the Bulgarian Shooting Union, member of the IOC, commission member of the Bulgarian Olympic Committee (BOC), former MP, chairman of the State Agency for Youth and Sports (2005–2009) and acting Minister of Youth and Sports in the first and second government of Galab Donev.

Letcheva is a graduate of the National Sports Academy. She received a PhD in 2009 in theory and methodology of physical education and sports training. Her thesis was A study of the situational psychological and physical preparation of sports shooting competitors.

== Sports career ==
Letcheva is a shooting sport athlete and her personal coach was her father – Nikolay Letchev, one of the best and most successful experts in the world. He was awarded a special diploma for best shooting coach of the century for his contributions to shooting sport by the International Federation in 2007 in Munich.

Letcheva started shooting practices when she was 11. Before that she was a volleyball player in her home city.

The highest achievement in her career are the two silver medals from the Olympic Games. She won the silver medal in the 50 m rifle 3 pos in the 1988 Summer Olympics in Seoul and 10 m air rifle in the 1992 Summer Olympics in Barcelona.

She is a five-time world champion – Zuhl 1986 (two gold medals), Budapest 1987, Sarajevo 1989, Moscow – 1990. Letcheva holds the record for the most world titles in women's rifle Olympic events. She is four-time winner of the World Cup, along with three more silver and two bronze medals (1986–1999).

According to the statistics of the International Shooting Sports Federation, Vessela Letcheva is the shooter with the most titles and medals won in World Cup tournaments in the history of the sport with 31 gold, 13 silver and 11 bronze medals between 1985 and 1999. Letcheva won eight gold, two silver and three bronze medals at European championships.

She was chosen as the number one shooter of the 20th century in the world, according to a Shooting Sport Federation poll. She was the athlete of the year in Bulgaria in 1989.

Letcheva is the President of the Bulgarian Shooting Federation since 2022 and was re-elected in July 2023.

Letcheva was chosen as a member of the Public Affairs and Corporate Communications Commission (International Olympic Committee) in October 2023.

== Political career ==
Vessela Letcheva was a Member of Bulgarian Parliament in the 39th (2001–2005), 40th (2005–2009) and 45th (2017–2021) National Assembly from the citizen quota of the Bulgarian Socialist Party.

As a member of parliament, she was the vice-chairperson of the Standing Committee on Children, Youth and Sports (2017–2021) and also vice-chairperson of the Standing Committee on Social Policy.

Chairperson of the State Agency for Youth and Sports (2005–2009) in the government of Prime Minister Sergey Stanishev. Under her leadership, the institution became the driving force of numerous programs aimed at giving access to sports for kids, as well as for the support and development of young sports talents - such as “Learn to ski”, “Learn to play tennis” and “Learn to swim”. These programs are active and popular to this day.

Letcheva was Minister of Youth and Sports in the government of Prime Minister Galab Donev (August 2022 – June 2023). Within the term of office of Minister Vessela Letcheva, one of the largest halls in the country “Arena Burgas” was opened after many years of problems with the investment, the developer and the deadlines. During the mandate of Vesela Lecheva, the state became a co-shareholder with the CSKA football club and began the procedure for the renovation of the Bulgarian Army Stadium, which is CSKA's football home.

Another important innovation in the mandate of Minister Letcheva was the new policy which was implemented regarding Bulgarian coaches and their pay, so that the best specialists could remain working in the country.

She was awarded the title of Honorary Citizen of Veliko Tarnovo.

== Personal life ==
Vessela Letcheva had a son, Martin Velev, who died at age 36 in a jet ski accident in July 2026.
