= Vincenzo Tondo =

Italian sports shooter

Personal information
- Nationality: Italian
- Born: 10 March 1937 (age 89) Corato, Italy

Sport
- Sport: Sports shooting

Vincenzo Tondo (born 10 March 1937) is an Italian sports shooter. He competed at the 1976 Summer Olympics, the 1984 Summer Olympics and the 1988 Summer Olympics.
