= Yevgeny Rasskazov =

Soviet sports shooter (born 1941)

Personal information
- Born: 21 October 1941 Zadonsk, Soviet Union
- Died: 16 April 2002 (aged 60)

Sport
- Sport: Sports shooting

Yevgeny Rasskazov (21 October 1941 – 16 April 2002) was a Soviet sports shooter. He competed in the 50 metre pistol event at the 1964 Summer Olympics.
