= Vitaly Parkhimovich =

Soviet sport shooter

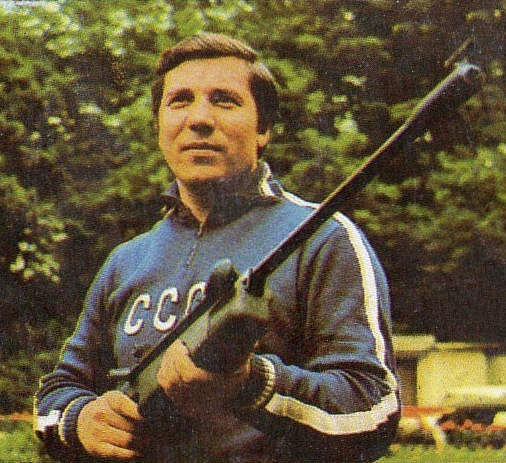
- Parkhimovich c. 1972

Personal information
- Born: 17 June 1943 Ryazan, Soviet Union
- Died: 15 January 1995 (aged 51)
- Height: 177 cm (5 ft 10 in)
- Weight: 84 kg (185 lb)

Sport
- Sport: Sports shooting
- Event: Rifle
- Club: Soviet Army Minsk
Medal record
Representing Soviet Union
Olympic Games
Bronze medal – third place	1968 Mexico City	50 m rifle, three positions

Vitaly Mikhailovich Parkhimovich (Russian: Виталий Михайлович Пархимович, 17 June 1943 – 15 January 1995) was a Soviet rifle shooter. He competed at the 1968 and 1972 Summer Olympics, and won a bronze medal in the three positions event in 1968.

Parkhimovich was born in Russia in a family of a career military officer. In 1948 he moved to Belarus where he lived most of his life. During his career he won nine gold and seven silver medals in various rifle events at the world championships. He also won 13 European titles, seven times placing second.
