= Rudolf Dollinger =

Austrian sport shooter (born 1944)

Personal information
- Born: 4 April 1944 Telfes, Nazi Germany

Sport
- Sport: Sports shooting
Medal record
Men's shooting
Representing Austria
Olympic Games
Bronze medal – third place	1972 Munich	50 metre pistol
Bronze medal – third place	1976 Montreal	50 metre pistol

Rudolf Dollinger (born 4 April 1944) is an Austrian former sport shooter who competed in the 1972 Summer Olympics and in the 1976 Summer Olympics. He won a bronze medal at each Olympics.
