= Anka Pelova =

Bulgarian sports shooter

Personal information
- Nationality: Bulgarian
- Born: 27 January 1939 (age 86)

Sport
- Sport: Sports shooting

Anka Pelova (Bulgarian: Анка Пелова) (born 27 January 1939) is a Bulgarian sports shooter. She competed in the mixed 50 metre rifle, prone event at the 1976 Summer Olympics.
