= Anișoara Matei =

Romanian sports shooter

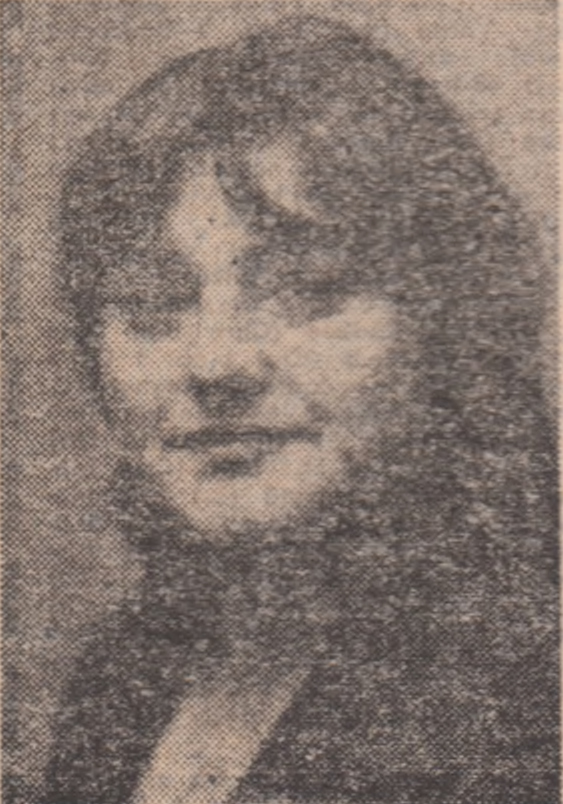
- Anișoara Matei in 1974

Personal information
- Nationality: Romanian
- Born: 16 August 1951 (age 74) Voluntari, Romania

Sport
- Sport: Sports shooting

Anișoara Matei (born 16 August 1951) is a Romanian sports shooter. She competed in two events at the 1988 Summer Olympics.
