= Tüdeviin Myagmarjav =

Mongolian sports shooter (born 1945)

Personal information
- Born: 5 February 1945 (age 81) Govi-Altai, Mongolia

Sport
- Sport: Sports shooting

Tüdeviin Myagmarjav (born 5 February 1945) is a Mongolian former sports shooter. He competed at the 1964, 1968, 1972 and 1976 Summer Olympics. He also competed at the 1974 Asian Games and won a bronze medal.
