= Tserenjavyn Ölziibayar =

Mongolian sport shooter (born 1946)

Personal information
- Born: 2 May 1946 (age 80)

Sport
- Sport: Sports shooting

Tserenjavyn Ölziibayar (born 2 May 1946) is a Mongolian former sports shooter. He competed at the 1972 Summer Olympics and the 1976 Summer Olympics.
