= Gottfried Kustermann =

West German sports shooter (1943–2023)

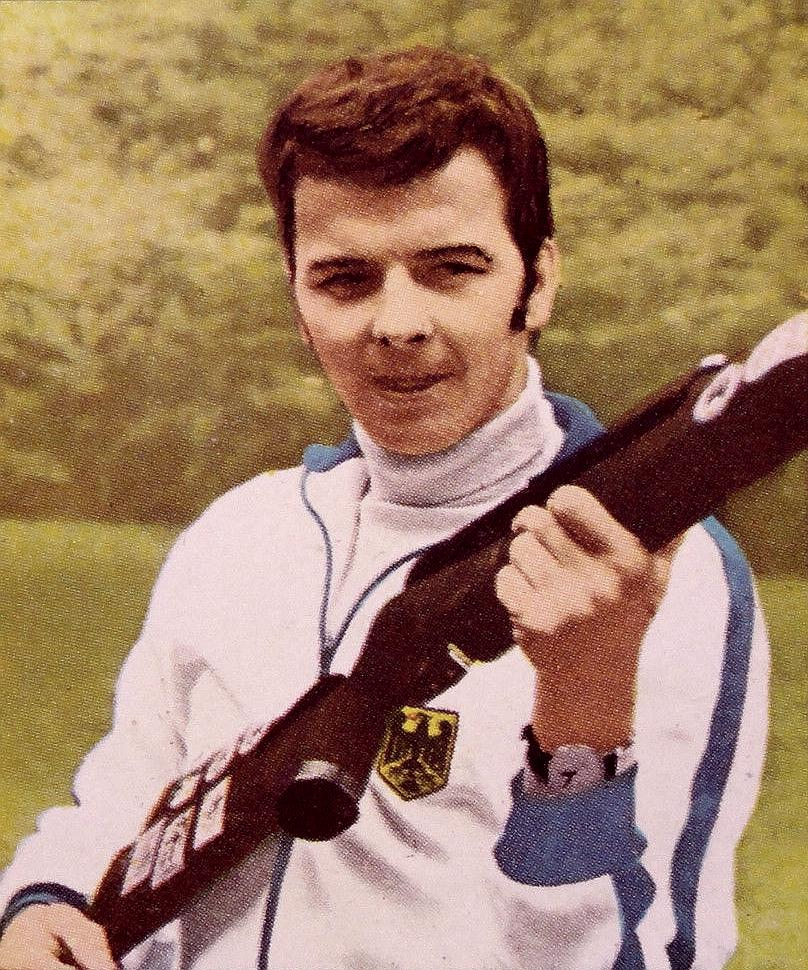
- Kustermann c. 1972

Personal information
- Born: 7 October 1943 Garching, Gau Munich-Upper Bavaria, Germany
- Died: 19 March 2023 (aged 79) Munich, Bavaria, Germany
- Height: 180 cm (5 ft 11 in)
- Weight: 75 kg (165 lb)

Sport
- Sport: Sports shooting
- Event: Rifle
- Club: HSG München
Medal record
Representing West Germany
World Championships
Gold medal – first place	1970 Phoenix	10 m air rifle, team
Gold medal – first place	1970 Phoenix	10 m air rifle, ind.
Bronze medal – third place	1970 Phoenix	50 m rifle three positions, team
Bronze medal – third place	1970 Phoenix	50 m free rifle kneeling 40 shots, team
Gold medal – first place	1974 Thun	10 m air rifle, team
Bronze medal – third place	1974 Thun	50 m rifle three positions, team
Bronze medal – third place	1974 Thun	50 m free rifle kneeling 40 shots, team
Gold medal – first place	1978 Seoul	10 m air rifle, team
Silver medal – second place	1978 Seoul	50 m rifle three positions, team
Silver medal – second place	1978 Seoul	50 m free rifle standing 40 shots, team
Silver medal – second place	1978 Seoul	50 m free rifle kneeling 40 shots, team

Gottfried Kustermann (7 October 1943 – 19 March 2023) was a West German sports shooter. He competed at the 1972 and 1976 Summer Olympics in three small-bore rifle events with the best result of seventh place in 1972. Kusterman won an individual world title in 10 meter air rifle in 1970, as well as several team medals between 1970 and 1978.

Kustermann died in Munich, Bavaria on 19 March 2023, at the age of 79.
