= Vladimir Stolypin =

Soviet sports shooter

Personal information
- Born: 20 February 1937 (age 89) Moscow, Soviet Union

Sport
- Sport: Sports shooting

Vladimir Stolypin (born 20 February 1937) is a Soviet former sports shooter. He competed at the 1968 Summer Olympics and the 1972 Summer Olympics.
