= Hubert Garschall =

Austrian sports shooter

Personal information
- Born: 29 December 1939 (age 86) Hüttenhof, Nazi Germany

Sport
- Sport: Sports shooting
Medal record
Representing Austria
European Shooting Championships
Bronze medal – third place	1969 Plzeň	50 m pistol
Bronze medal – third place	1975 London	10 m air pistol

Hubert Garschall (born 29 December 1939) is an Austrian former sports shooter. He competed at the 1968, 1972 and 1976 Summer Olympics.
