= Grigory Kosykh =

Soviet sport shooter

Personal information
- Born: 9 February 1934 Oral, Kazakh SSR, Soviet Union
- Died: 23 February 2012 (aged 78) Moscow, Russia

Sport
- Sport: Sports shooting
Medal record
Men's shooting
Representing Soviet Union
Olympic Games
Gold medal – first place	1968 Mexico	50 m pistol

Grigory Kosykh (Russian: Григорий Георгиевич Косых; 9 February 1934 – 23 February 2012) was a Soviet sports shooter and Olympic medalist. Kosykh was born in Oral, Kazakhstan, then part of the Soviet Union. He won a gold medal in the 50 metre pistol at the 1968 Summer Olympics in Mexico City.
