= Kjell Jacobsson =

Swedish sports shooter

Personal information
- Born: 30 November 1936 (age 89) Strömsund, Sweden

Sport
- Sport: Sports shooting

Kjell Jacobsson (born 30 November 1936) is a Swedish former sports shooter. He competed at the 1972 Summer Olympics and the 1976 Summer Olympics.
