= Taiwan at the 1968 Summer Olympics =

- Flag of the Republic of China
- IOC code: ROC (TWN used at these Games)
- NOC: Republic of China Olympic Committee (Note: See Chinese Taipei Olympic Committee#History.)

in Mexico City
- Competitors: 43 (35 men, 8 women) in 8 sports
- Medals Ranked 42nd: Gold 0 Silver 0 Bronze 1 Total 1

Summer Olympics appearances (overview)
- 1956; 1960; 1964; 1968; 1972; 1976–1980; 1984; 1988; 1992; 1996; 2000; 2004; 2008; 2012; 2016; 2020; 2024

Other related appearances
- China (1952–pres.); Chinese Taipei (1956–pres.)

Taiwan (governed by the Republic of China) competed at the 1968 Summer Olympics in Mexico City, Mexico. 43 competitors, 35 men, and 8 women took part in 57 events in 8 sports.

== Medalists ==
Medal	Name	Sport	Event	Date
Bronze	Chi Cheng	Athletics	Women's 80 metres hurdles	18 October

== Athletics ==
=== Track events ===
Athlete	Event	Round 1		Quarterfinal		Semifinal		Final	
Athlete	Event	Result	Rank	Result	Rank	Result	Rank	Result	Rank
Chen Chuan-Show	Men's 100 m	10.91	6 (h4)	Did not advance					
Su Wen-Ho	Men's 100 m	10.81	7 (h5)	Did not advance					
Kun Min-Mu	Men's 200 m	22.44	7 (h2)	Did not advance					
Kun Min-Mu	Men's 400 m	49.0	7 (h8)	Did not advance					
Su Po-Tai	Men's 110 m hurdles	15.0	7 (h2)	Did not advance					
Chi Cheng	Women's 100 m	11.4	3 (h4)	11.3w	2 (h2)	11.4	4 (h1)	11.5	7
Tien Ah-Mei	Women's 200 m	25.5	7 (h1)	Did not advance					
Yeh Chu-Mei	Women's 200 m	25.5	8 (h2)	Did not advance					
Chi Cheng	Women's 80 m hurdles	—		10.5	2 (h4)	10.5	2 (h2)	10.4	3rd place, bronze medalist(s)
Yeh Chu-Mei	Women's 80 m hurdles	11.7	5 (h5)	Did not advance					
Chi Cheng, Yeh Chu-Mei, Lin Chun-Yu, Tien Ah-Mei	Women's 4 × 100 m relay	47.2	6 (h2)	Did not advance					
Wu Ah-Min	Men's decathlon	—						7209	15
Chen Chuan-Show	Men's decathlon	—						DNF	—

=== Field events ===
Athlete	Event	Qualification		Final	
Athlete	Event	Result	Rank	Result	Rank
Hong Son-Long	Men's high jump	1.90 m	37	Did not advance	
Wu Ah-Min	Men's pole vault	4.60 m	21	Did not advance	
Su Wen-Ho	Men's long jump	7.10 m	28	Did not advance	
Chen Ming-Chi	Men's long jump	6.95 m	31	Did not advance	
Chen Chuan-Show	Men's long jump	DNS		—	
Chen Ming-Chi	Men's triple jump	15.80 m	31	Did not advance	
Lin Chun-Yu	Women's long jump	5.80 m	23	Did not advance	
Lin Chun-Yu	Women's pentathlon	—		4104	26
Tien Ah-Mei	Women's pentathlon	—		3899	27

== Cycling ==
Five cyclists represented Taiwan in 1968.

Individual road race

- Deng Chueng-hwai
- Liu Cheng-tao
- Shue Ming-shu

Team time trial

- Deng Chueng-hwai
- Liu Cheng-tao
- Shue Ming-shu
- Jiang Guang-nan

Sprint

- Fan Yue-tao

1000m time trial

- Fan Yue-tao

== Shooting ==
Eight shooters, all male, represented Taiwan in 1968.

25 m pistol

- Chou Yen-sheng

50 m pistol

- Chen Jeng-gang
- Cheng Chi-sen

300 m rifle, three positions

- Wu Tao-yan

50 m rifle, three positions

- Wu Tao-yan
- Pan Kou-ang

50 m rifle, prone

- Wu Tao-yan
- Tai Chao-chih

Trap

- Lin Ho-ming
- Cheng Sung-gun

== See also ==
- Chinese Taipei at the Olympics
