= Taiwan at the 1964 Summer Olympics =

- Flag of the Republic of China
- IOC code: ROC (TWN used at these Games)
- NOC: Republic of China Olympic Committee (Note: See Chinese Taipei Olympic Committee#History.)

in Tokyo
- Competitors: 40 (37 men, 3 women) in 7 sports
- Flag bearer: Wu Ah-Min
- Medals: Gold 0 Silver 0 Bronze 0 Total 0

Summer Olympics appearances (overview)
- 1956; 1960; 1964; 1968; 1972; 1976–1980; 1984; 1988; 1992; 1996; 2000; 2004; 2008; 2012; 2016; 2020; 2024

Other related appearances
- China (1952–pres.); Chinese Taipei (1956–pres.)

Taiwan (governed by the Republic of China) competed at the 1964 Summer Olympics in Tokyo, Japan. 40 competitors, 37 men and 3 women, took part in 46 events in 7 sports.

It competed as "Taiwan" in this competition. The International Olympic Committee (IOC) required the ROC (which under Chiang Kai-shek asserted that it was the lawful government of China) to compete as Taiwan.

In subsequent years pressure from the People's Republic of China on sports organizations has caused Taiwan to compete as Chinese Taipei as per the Nagoya Resolution.

== Athletics ==
Key

- Note–Ranks given for track events are within the athlete's heat only
- Q = Qualified for the next round
- q = Qualified for the next round as a fastest loser or, in field events, by position without achieving the qualifying target
- NR = National record
- N/A = Round not applicable for the event
- Bye = Athlete not required to compete in round

=== Track events ===
Athlete	Event	Round 1		Quarterfinal		Semifinal		Final	
Athlete	Event	Result	Rank	Result	Rank	Result	Rank	Result	Rank
Lee Ar-Tu	Men's 100 m	—	8 (h3)	Did not advance					
Lee Ar-Tu	Men's 200 m	—	6 (h4)	Did not advance					
Lin Kuei-Chang	Men's 110 m hurdles	DNS		—					
Yeh Chu-Mei	Women's 200 m	—	7 (h6)	Did not advance					
Yeh Chu-Mei	Women's 80 m hurdles	—	6 (h3)	Did not advance					
Chi Cheng	Women's 80 m hurdles	—	7 (h2)	Did not advance					
Yang Chuan-kwang	Men's decathlon	—						—	5
Wu Ah-Min	Men's decathlon	—						DNF	—

=== Field events ===
Athlete	Event	Qualification		Final	
Athlete	Event	Result	Rank	Result	Rank
Yang Chuan-kwang	Men's pole vault	—	10	Did not advance	
Wu Ah-Min	Men's pole vault	DNS		—	
Yang Chuan-kwang	Men's javelin throw	DNS		—	
Chi Cheng	Women's long jump	—	24	Did not advance	
Chi Cheng	Women's pentathlon	—		—	17

== Cycling ==
Four cyclists represented Taiwan in 1964.

Individual road race

- Her Jong-chau
- Shue Ming-shu
- Deng Chueng-hwai

Team time trial

- Deng Chueng-hwai
- Her Jong-chau
- Shue Ming-shu
- Yang Rong-hwa

1000m time trial

- Shue Ming-shu

== Shooting ==
Six shooters represented Taiwan in 1964.

25 m pistol

- Ma Chen-shan

300 m rifle, three positions

- Wu Tao-yan

50 m rifle, three positions

- Wu Tao-yan

50 m rifle, prone

- Pan Kou-ang
- Tai Chao-chih

Trap

- Lin Ho-ming
- Lin Wen-chu
