= 楠 =

楠 (Japanese: Kusunoki or Kusu (くすのき or くす, "camphor tree")) may refer to:

- Kusunoki (disambiguation)
- Kusu (disambiguation)

== See also ==
- Japanese destroyer Kusunoki
