= Kusunoki =

Japanese surname

Kusunoki (written: 楠 or 楠木, lit. "camphor tree") is a Japanese surname. Notable people with the surname include:

- Kei Kusunoki (楠 桂, born 1966), Japanese manga artist
- Kusunoki Masahide (楠木 正秀, died 1446), Japanese samurai
- Kusunoki Masaie (楠木 正家, died 1348), Japanese samurai
- Kusunoki Masanori (楠木 正儀, died 1390), Japanese samurai
- Kusunoki Masashige (楠木 正成, 1294–1336), Japanese samurai
- Kusunoki Masatsura (楠木 正行, 1326–1348), Japanese samurai
- Michiharu Kusunoki (楠 みちはる, born 1957), Japanese manga artist
- Shigeto Kusunoki (楠 成人, born 1934), Japanese sport shooter
- Taiten Kusunoki (楠 大典, born 1967), Japanese voice actor and actor
- Tomori Kusunoki (楠木 ともり, born 1999), Japanese voice actress
- Tsuneo Kusunoki (楠 恒男), Japanese businessman

== See also ==
- George Kusunoki Miller, better known as Joji, Japanese singer-songwriter, record producer, writer, Internet personality, YouTuber and comedian
- Kusunoki, Yamaguchi, a former town in Asa District, Yamaguchi Prefecture, Japan
- Kusunoki Point, a headland on the Biscoe Islands, Antarctica
- Japanese ship Kusunoki, several ships
- Kusu (disambiguation)
