= Vignaud =

Vignaud is a French surname. Notable people with the surname include:

- Jean Vignaud (1875–1962), French writer
- Louis Vignaud (1929–2014), French Olympic shooter
- Pierre Vignaud (born 1983), French footballer
- René Vignaud (1893–1969), French Olympic runner
