= Barry Downs =

Barry Downs may refer to:

- Barry Downs (sport shooter)
- Barry Downs (architect)
