= Shigeto =

- Gender: Male

Origin
- Origin: Japanese
- Meaning: Different meanings depending on the kanji used

Shigeto (written: 重人, 繁人, 成人 or 茂人) is a masculine Japanese given name. Notable people with the name include:

- Shigeto Ikeda (池田 茂人; 1925–2001), Japanese physician
- Shigeto Kawahara (川原 繁人; born 1980), Japanese linguist
- Shigeto Kusunoki (楠 成人; born 1934), Japanese sport shooter
- Shigeto Masuda (増田 繁人; born 1992), Japanese footballer
- Shigeto Oshida (押田 成人; 1922–2003), Japanese Catholic priest
- Shigeto Shimizu (清水 茂人; born 1953), Japanese basketball player
- Shigeto Tsuru (都留 重人; 1912–2006), Japanese economist
- Zachary Shigeto Saginaw, American musician better known mononymously as Shigeto (musician)

Shigetō or Shigetou (written: 重遠) is a separate given name, though it may be romanized the same way. Notable people with the name include:

- Dewa Shigetō (出羽 重遠; 1856–1930), Imperial Japanese Navy admiral

== See also ==
- Shigetō Station, a railway station in Kami, Kōchi Prefecture, Japan
