= Türker =

Türker is a Turkish male name and common surname which means "brave Turk" or "Turkish soldier". It may refer to:

== Given name ==
- Türker Armaner, Istanbul-based writer
- Türker İnanoğlu, Turkish screenwriter
- Türker Özenbaş, Turkish sports shooter

== Surname ==
- Berç Türker Keresteciyan, Turkish bank executive
- Masum Türker, Turkish politician
- Mert Naci Türker, Turkish tennis player
- Suat Türker, Turkish-German football player
- Mine Türker (born 2006), Turkish female boccia player
