= Japanese ship Kusunoki =

Several ships have been named Kusunoki or Kusu (楠 or くす, "camphor tree") :

- Japanese destroyer Kusunoki (1915), a Kaba-class destroyer of the Imperial Japanese Navy during World War I
- Japanese destroyer Kusunoki (1945), a Tachibana-class destroyer of the Imperial Japanese Navy during World War II
- JDS Kusu (PF-281), the lead ship of her class of the Japan Maritime Self-Defense Force, formerly USS Ogden (PF-39)
  - Kusu-class patrol frigate, a class of destroyer of the Japan Maritime Self-Defense Force, formerly USS Tacoma-class frigate

== See also ==
- Kusu (disambiguation)
- Kusunoki (disambiguation)
