= Leopoldo Martínez =

Mexican sports shooter

Personal information
- Born: 12 June 1943 (age 83) Tlalpujahua, Mexico

Sport
- Sport: Sports shooting

Leopoldo Martínez (born 12 June 1943) is a Mexican former sports shooter. He competed in the 50 metre pistol event at the 1968 Summer Olympics.
