= Enrique Barragán =

Uruguayan sports shooter (born 1934)

Personal information
- Born: October 4, 1934 Mercedes, Uruguay
- Died: May 4, 1988 (aged 53)

Sport
- Sport: Sports shooting

Enrique Barragán Méndez (4 October 1934 - 4 May 1988) was an Uruguayan former sports shooter. He competed in the 50 metre pistol event at the 1968 Summer Olympics, reaching a rank of 48.
