= Paul Musso =

French sports shooter (1931–2021)

Personal information
- Born: 4 December 1931 Marseille, France
- Died: 30 June 2021 (aged 89)

Sport
- Sport: Sports shooting

Paul Musso (4 December 1931 – 30 June 2021) was a French sports shooter. He competed in the 50 metre pistol event at the 1968 Summer Olympics. Musso died on 30 June 2021, at the age of 89.
