= Michael Marton =

Israeli sports shooter

Personal information
- Native name: מייקל מרטון
- Born: 10 January 1937 (age 89) Cluj-Napoca, Romania

Sport
- Sport: Sports shooting

Michael Marton (Hebrew: מייקל מרטון; born 10 January 1937) is an Israeli former sports shooter. He competed in the 50 metre pistol event at the 1968 Summer Olympics in Mexico City, Mexico. He ranked at 47th place in 69 participants, with a total score of 530 points.
