= Helmut Artelt =

German sports shooter

Personal information
- Born: 7 November 1940 (age 85) Breslau, Germany

Sport
- Sport: Sports shooting

Helmut Artelt (born 7 November 1940) is a German former sports shooter. He competed in the 50 metre pistol event at the 1968 Summer Olympics for East Germany.
