= Kurt Meyer (sport shooter) =

German sports shooter

Personal information
- Born: 16 September 1933 (age 92) Wuppertal, Germany

Sport
- Sport: Sports shooting

Kurt Meyer (born 16 September 1933) is a German former sports shooter. He competed in the 50 metre pistol event at the 1968 Summer Olympics for West Germany.
