= Jaroslav Veselý =

Czech sport shooter

Personal information
- Born: 12 February 1937 (age 89) Plzeň, Czechoslovakia

Sport
- Sport: Sport shooting

Jaroslav Veselý (born 12 February 1937) is a Czech former sport shooter. He competed in the 50 metre pistol event at the 1968 Summer Olympics.
