= Walter Vera =

Uruguayan sports shooter (1928–2018)

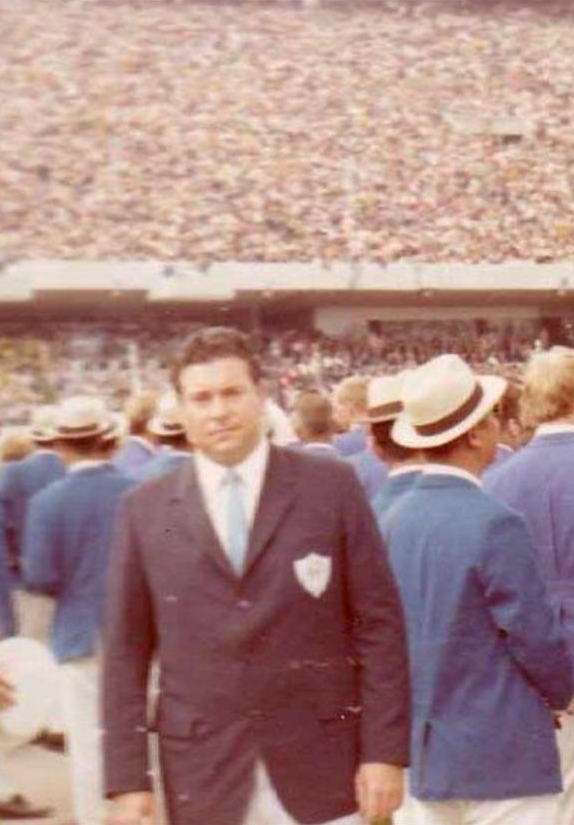

Personal information
- Born: 29 March 1928 Durazno, Uruguay
- Died: 24 May 2018 (aged 90)

Sport
- Sport: Sports shooting

Walter Vera (29 March 1928 – 24 May 2018) was a Uruguayan sports shooter. He competed in the 50 metre pistol event at the 1968 Summer Olympics.
