= Arnold Vitarbo =

American sports shooter

Personal information
- Born: January 31, 1936 New York, New York, U.S.
- Died: September 14, 2022 (aged 86) St. George, Utah, U.S.

Sport
- Sport: Sports shooting

Arnold Vitarbo (January 31, 1936 – September 14, 2022) was an American sports shooter. He competed in the 50 metre pistol event at the 1968 Summer Olympics.

== Personal life ==
Vitarbo was a member of the Church of Jesus Christ of Latter-day Saints. He was born and raised a Catholic but was introduced to the church by a fellow shooting instructor.
