= Antonio Mendoza (sport shooter) =

Filipino sport shooter

Personal information
- Born: 27 June 1939 (age 87) Manila, Philippines

Sport
- Sport: Sports shooting

Antonio Mendoza (born 27 June 1939) is a Filipino former sports shooter. He competed in the 50 metre pistol event at the 1968 Summer Olympics.
