= Shooting at the 1968 Summer Olympics – Mixed 50 metre pistol =

Men's 50 metre pistol at the Games of the XIX Olympiad
- Shooting pictogram
- Venue: Vicente Suárez Shooting Range
- Date: 18 October 1968
- Competitors: 69 from 42 nations
- Winning score: 562 OR

Medalists
1st place, gold medalist(s)		Grigory Kosykh; Soviet Union
2nd place, silver medalist(s)		Heinz Mertel; West Germany
3rd place, bronze medalist(s)		Harald Vollmar; East Germany

The mixed (or "open") ISSF 50 meter pistol was a shooting sports event held as part of the Shooting at the 1968 Summer Olympics programme. It was the twelfth appearance of the event, and the first where the competition was open to women (though none competed). The competition was held on 18 October 1968 at the shooting ranges in Mexico City. 69 shooters from 42 nations competed. Nations had been limited to two shooters each since the 1952 Games. The event was won by Grigory Kosykh of the Soviet Union in a shoot-off, the nation's second victory in the event (tying Finland for second-most all-time behind the United States' four). Heinz Mertel of West Germany took silver while Harald Vollmar of East Germany took bronze, with each nation earning a medal in their first competition separate from each other; they were the first medals for any German shooter in the free pistol since 1936.

== Background ==
This was the 12th appearance of the ISSF 50 meter pistol event. The event was held at every Summer Olympics from 1896 to 1920 (except 1904, when no shooting events were held) and from 1936 to 2016; it was nominally open to women from 1968 to 1980, although very few women participated these years. A separate women's event would be introduced in 1984. 1896 and 1908 were the only Games in which the distance was not 50 metres; the former used 30 metres and the latter 50 yards.

Four of the top 10 shooters from the 1964 Games returned: two-time bronze medalist Yoshihisa Yoshikawa of Japan, sixth-place finisher Antonio Vita of Peru, seventh-place finisher Leif Larsson of Sweden, and ninth-place finisher An Jae-song of South Korea. Two-time reigning (1962 and 1966) world champion Vladimir Stolypin was on the Soviet Olympic team; runner-up Dencho Denev of Bulgaria and third-place finisher Hynek Hromada of Czechoslovakia also competed in Mexico City.

The Republic of China, Costa Rica, El Salvador, Israel, Trinidad and Tobago, Turkey, Uruguay, and Vietnam each made their debut in the event; East and West Germany competed separately for the first time. The United States made its 11th appearance, most of any nation, having missed only the 1900 event.

Markkanen used a TsKIB SOO MЦ55. The most popular pistol, used by over two thirds of the shooters, was the German Hämmerli. The Soviet weapon was used by 16% and the Austrian pistol by 6%. The American team used custom weapons designed by Franklin Green, who had competed in the event in 1964 but did not make the United States team in 1968.

== Competition format ==
Each shooter fired 60 shots, in 6 series of 10 shots each, at a distance of 50 metres. The target was round, 50 centimetres in diameter, with 10 scoring rings. Scoring for each shot was up to 10 points, in increments of 1 point. The maximum score possible was 600 points. Any pistol was permitted. Shoot-offs were held to break ties for top ranks.

== Records ==
Prior to this competition, the existing world and Olympic records were as follows.

World record	Anton Jasinsky (URS)	566	Bucharest, Romania	1955
Olympic record	Aleksey Gushchin (URS); Väinö Markkanen (FIN)	560	Rome, Italy; Tokyo, Japan	6 September 1960; 18 October 1964

Grigory Kosykh and Heinz Mertel broke the Olympic record, tying at 562 before a shoot-off.

== Schedule ==
Date	Time	Round
Friday, 18 October 1968	8:30	Final

== Results ==
Rank	Shooter	Nation	Score	Notes
1st place, gold medalist(s)	Grigory Kosykh	Soviet Union	562	OR; Shoot-off: 30
2nd place, silver medalist(s)	Heinz Mertel	West Germany	562	OR; Shoot-off: 26
3rd place, bronze medalist(s)	Harald Vollmar	East Germany	560	
4	Arnold Vitarbo	United States	559	
5	Paweł Małek	Poland	556	
6	Helmut Artelt	East Germany	555	
7	Nelson Oñate	Cuba	555	
8	Neagu Bratu	Romania	554	
9	Matti Patteri	Finland	554	
10	Vladimir Stolypin	Soviet Union	552	
11	Lucian Giuşcă	Romania	552	
12	Ernst Stoll	Switzerland	550	
13	John Rødseth	Norway	550	
14	Hynek Hromada	Czechoslovakia	550	
15	William Hare	Canada	549	
16	Don Hamilton	United States	549	
17	Yoshihisa Yoshikawa	Japan	548	
18	Hubert Garschall	Austria	547	
19	Tüdeviin Myagmarjav	Mongolia	547	
20	Jørgen Gabrielsen	Denmark	547	
21	Leif Larsson	Sweden	546	
22	Seppo Saarenpää	Finland	546	
23	Albert Späni	Switzerland	546	
24	Dencho Denev	Bulgaria	545	
25	László Mucza	Hungary	545	
26	Börje Nilsson	Sweden	544	
27	Jaroslav Veselý	Czechoslovakia	544	
28	Rajmund Stachurski	Poland	544	
29	Charles Sexton	Great Britain	543	
30	Nico Klein	Luxembourg	543	
31	Jules Sobrian	Canada	543	
32	Louis Vignaud	France	543	
33	José Amedo	Spain	542	
34	An Jae-song	South Korea	541	
35	Barry Downs	Australia	541	
36	Leopoldo Martínez	Mexico	540	
37	Edgar Espinoza	Venezuela	540	
38	Bertram Manhin	Trinidad and Tobago	539	
39	Gerardo Castañeda	Guatemala	537	
40	Niels Dahl	Denmark	536	
41	Juan García	Spain	534	
42	Antonio Vita	Peru	533	
43	Hồ Minh Thu	Vietnam	533	
44	Sutham Aswanit	Thailand	533	
45	Kim Yong-bae	South Korea	532	
46	Arturo Costa	Cuba	530	
47	Michael Marton	Israel	530	
48	Enrique Barragán	Uruguay	529	
49	Javier Peregrina	Mexico	528	
50	Shigeto Kusunoki	Japan	528	
51	Paul Musso	France	527	
52	Türker Özenbaş	Turkey	526	
53	Chen Jeng-gang	Chinese Taipei	525	
54	Walter Vera	Uruguay	524	
55	Durval Guimarães	Brazil	524	
56	Cheng Chi-sen	Chinese Taipei	521	
57	Dương Văn Dan	Vietnam	519	
58	Tito Castillo	El Salvador	519	
59	Francisco Sandoval	Guatemala	519	
60	Antonio Mendoza	Philippines	514	
61	José Agdamag	Philippines	514	
62	Marcus Loader	Great Britain	512	
63	José González	Puerto Rico	511	
64	Amorn Yuktanandana	Thailand	511	
65	Kurt Meyer	West Germany	506	
66	Loh Kok Heng	Singapore	499	
67	Antonio Mora	Costa Rica	499	
68	Rodrigo Ruiz	Costa Rica	485	
69	Miguel Barasorda	Puerto Rico	481	
