= Jørgen Gabrielsen =

Danish sports shooter (born 1935)

Personal information
- Born: 11 October 1935 (age 90) Hillerød, Denmark

Sport
- Sport: Sports shooting

Jørgen Gabrielsen (born 11 October 1935) is a Danish former sports shooter. He competed in the 50 metre pistol event at the 1968 Summer Olympics.
