= Matti Patteri =

Finnish sports shooter

Personal information
- Born: 5 November 1941 (age 84) Lapua, Finland

Sport
- Sport: Sports shooting

Matti Patteri (born 5 November 1941) is a Finnish former sports shooter. He competed in the 50 metre pistol event at the 1968 Summer Olympics.
