= Dương Văn Dan =

Vietnamese sports shooter (born 1937)

Personal information
- Born: 20 December 1937 (age 88) Long Xuyên, French Indochina

Sport
- Sport: Sports shooting

Dương Văn Dan (born 20 December 1937) is a Vietnamese former sports shooter. He competed in the 50 metre pistol event at the 1968 Summer Olympics.
