= Börje Nilsson (sport shooter) =

Swedish sports shooter

Personal information
- Born: 28 June 1935 (age 91) Emmaboda, Sweden

Sport
- Sport: Sports shooting

Börje Nilsson (born 28 June 1935) is a Swedish former sports shooter. He competed in the 50 metre pistol event at the 1968 Summer Olympics.
