= Marcus Loader =

British sports shooter (born 1943)

Personal information
- Born: 5 November 1943 (age 82) Rugby, Warwickshire, England

Sport
- Sport: Sports shooting

Marcus Loader (born 5 November 1943) is a British former sports shooter. He competed in the 50 metre pistol event at the 1968 Summer Olympics.
