= Heinz Mertel =

German sport shooter

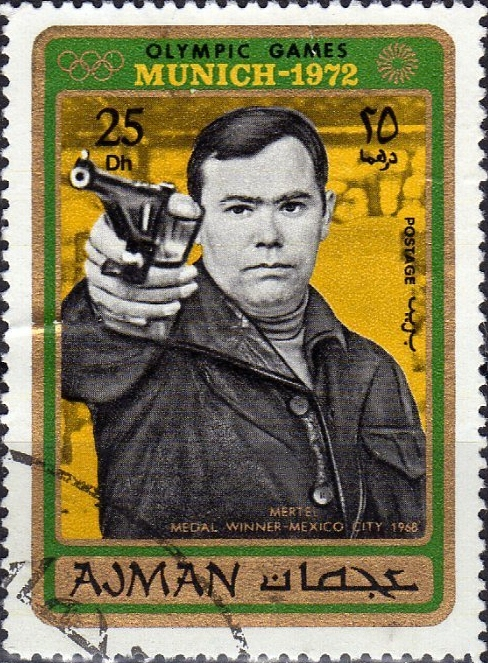

Personal information
- Born: 19 July 1936 (age 90) Nürnberg, Germany
- Height: 1.80 m (5 ft 11 in)
- Weight: 83 kg (183 lb)

Sport
- Sport: Shooting
- Club: Polizei SV München; Schützengesellschaft Stadeln bei Fürth; FSG "Der Bund", München
Medal record
Representing West Germany
Olympic Games
Silver medal – second place	1968 Mexico City	50 metre pistol

Heinz Mertel (born 19 July 1936) is a German former sport shooter. He competed in the 50 m pistol event at the 1968, 1972 and 1976 Summer Olympics, and finished in second, sixteen and fourth place, respectively.
