= Lucian Giușcă =

Romanian sports shooter

Personal information
- Born: 28 July 1943 (age 82) Iași, Romania

Sport
- Sport: Sports shooting

Lucian Giușcă (born 28 July 1943) is a Romanian former sports shooter. He competed in the 50 metre pistol event at the 1968 Summer Olympics.
