= José González (Puerto Rican sport shooter) =

Puerto Rican sport shooter

Personal information
- Born: 19 March 1925 Cayey, Puerto Rico
- Died: 3 October 2016 (aged 91)

Sport
- Sport: Sports shooting

José González (19 March 1925 – 3 October 2016) was a Puerto Rican sports shooter. He competed in the 50 metre pistol event at the 1968 Summer Olympics.
