= Kusunoki Masahide =

Kusunoki Masahide (楠木 正秀), a descendant of Kusunoki Masahige, was a supporter of the Southern Court during the Nanboku-chō period (15th century) in Japan. By attempting to restore the dynasty, Masahide followed in stealing the Three Sacred Treasures during the year 1443, then fled with the Southern pretender, Prince Manjuji to the Yoshino mountains. There Masahide held out on the site of the Ryusenji temple within Kotochi until the year 1457.

Kusunoki was an ordained priest within the Shin Buddhist branch Honganji-ha.
