= José Amedo =

Spanish sports shooter

Personal information
- Born: 21 June 1918 Cerceda, Spain
- Died: 31 May 2010 (aged 91)

Sport
- Sport: Sports shooting

José Amedo (21 June 1918 – 30 May 2010) was a Spanish sports shooter. He competed in the 50 metre pistol event at the 1968 Summer Olympics.
