= Kun Min-mu =

Taiwanese sprinter

Personal information
- Nationality: Taiwanese
- Born: 柯 明茂, Pinyin: Kē Míng-mào; 23 November 1941 (age 84)

Sport
- Sport: Sprinting
- Event: 200 metres

Kun Min-mu (born 23 November 1941) is a Taiwanese sprinter. He competed in the men's 200 metres at the 1968 Summer Olympics.
