= Türker Özenbaş =

Turkish sports shooter

Personal information
- Born: 1936 (age 89–90) Istanbul, Turkey

Sport
- Sport: Sports shooting

Türker Özenbaş (born 1936) is a Turkish former sports shooter. He competed in the 50 metre pistol event at the 1968 Summer Olympics.
