= Cheng Chi-sen =

Taiwanese sports shooter (born 1926)

Personal information
- Full name: 鄭 積森, Pinyin: Zhèng Jī-sēn
- Born: 13 July 1926 (age 99) Enping, China

Sport
- Sport: Sports shooting

Cheng Chi-sen (born 13 July 1926) is a Taiwanese former sports shooter. He competed in the 50 metre pistol event at the 1968 Summer Olympics. He also competed at the 1966 Asian Games.
