= Barry Downs (sport shooter) =

Australian sports shooter (1930–2020)

Personal information
- Born: 24 May 1930 Queensland, Australia
- Died: 5 April 2020 (aged 89) Australia

Sport
- Sport: Sports shooting

Barry Geoffrey Downs (24 May 1930 – 5 April 2020) was an Australian sports shooter. He competed in the 50 metre pistol event and the 25 metre rapid fire pistol event at the 1968 Summer Olympics. Downs died in 2020, aged 89.
