= Chen Chuan-show =

Taiwanese sprinter

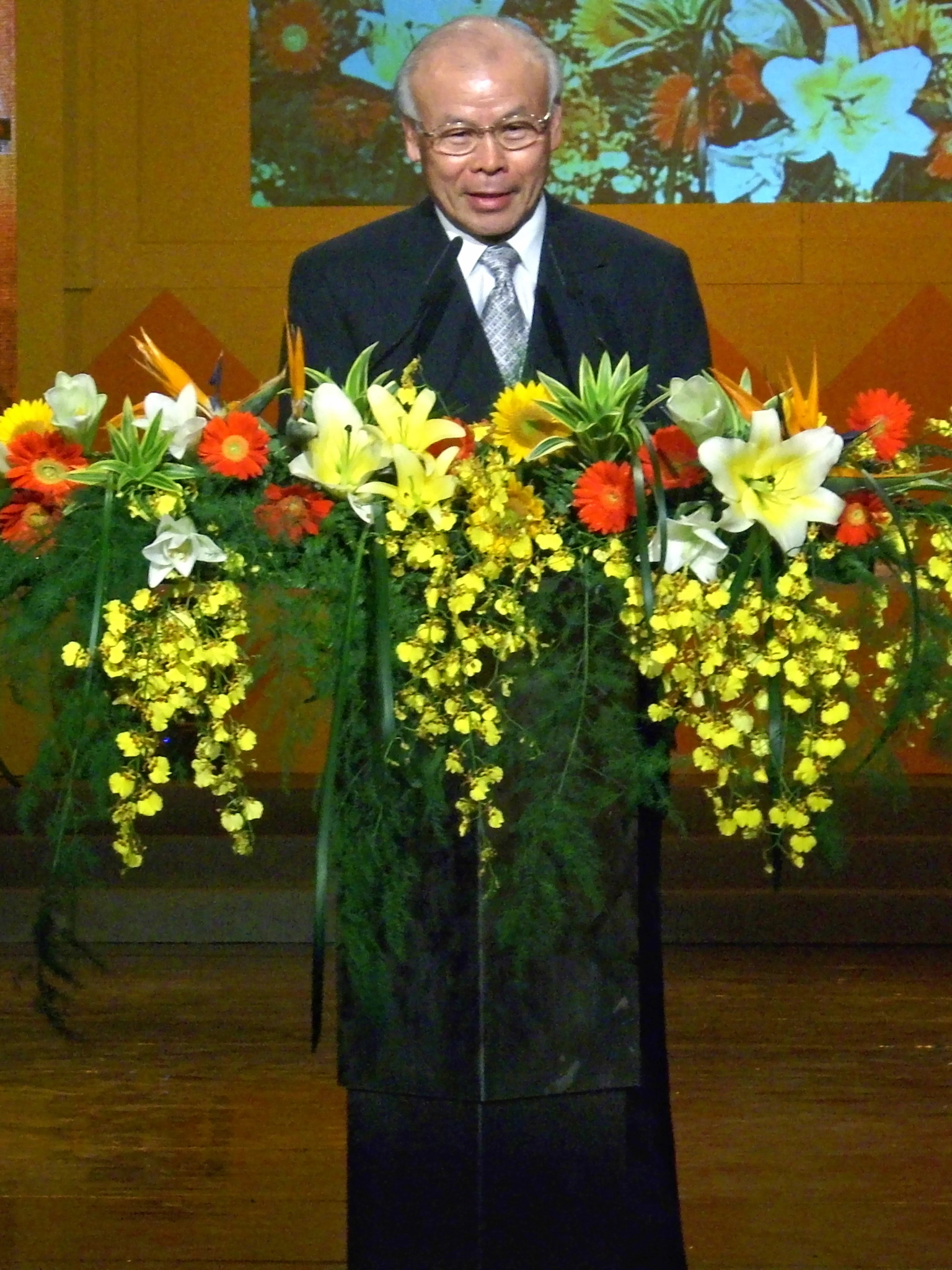
- Chen at Taiwan Sports Elite Awards in 2007

Personal information
- Nationality: Taiwanese
- Born: 陳全壽, Pinyin: Chén Quán-shòu; 9 September 1941 (age 84)

Sport
- Sport: Sprinting
- Event: 100 metres

Chen Chuan-show (born 9 September 1941) is a Taiwanese sprinter. He competed in the men's 100 metres and the decathlon at the 1968 Summer Olympics.
