= Tien Ah-mei =

Taiwanese sprinter

Personal information
- Nationality: Taiwanese
- Born: 田 阿妹, Pinyin: Tián ā mèi 20 June 1946 (age 79)

Sport
- Sport: Sprinting
- Event: 200 metres

Tien Ah-mei (born 20 June 1946) is a Taiwanese sprinter. She competed in the women's 200 metres at the 1968 Summer Olympics.
