= Her Jong-chau =

Taiwanese cyclist

Personal information
- Full name: 何 仲超, Pinyin: Hé Zhòng-chāo
- Born: 5 January 1946 (age 80)

Cycling career
- Sport: Cycling

Her Jong-chau (born 5 January 1946) is a former Taiwanese cyclist. He competed in the individual road race and team time trial events at the 1964 Summer Olympics.
