= Liu Cheng-tao =

Taiwanese cyclist (born 1937)

Personal information
- Full name: 劉 正道, Pinyin: Liú Zhèng-dào
- Born: 2 October 1937 (age 89) Yunlin County, Taiwan

Cycling career
- Sport: Cycling

Liu Cheng-tao (born 2 October 1937) is a former Taiwanese cyclist. He competed in the individual road race and the team time trial events at the 1968 Summer Olympics.
