= Louis Vignaud =

French sports shooter

Personal information
- Born: 14 June 1929 Angers, France
- Died: 10 July 2014 (aged 85)

Sport
- Sport: Sports shooting

Louis Vignaud (14 June 1929 – 10 July 2014) was a French sports shooter. He competed in the 50 metre pistol event at the 1968 Summer Olympics.
