= Chen Jeng-gang =

Taiwanese sports shooter

Personal information
- Full name: 陳 正剛, Pinyin: Chén Zhèng-gāng
- Born: 22 April 1925 Wuchang, China

Sport
- Sport: Sports shooting

Chen Jeng-gang (born 22 April 1925) is a Taiwanese former sports shooter. He competed in the 50 metre pistol event at the 1968 Summer Olympics. He also competed at the 1966 Asian Games.
