= Kusu =

Kusu or KUSU may refer to:

- Kusu, Mie, a former town in Mie Prefecture, Japan
- Kusu, Ōita, a town in Ōita Prefecture, Japan
- Kusu District, Ōita, a district in Ōita Prefecture, Japan
- Kusu Station, a railway station in Japan
- JDS Kusu, a patrol frigate of the Japan Maritime Self-Defense Force
- Kusu Island, an island in Singapore
- KUSU-FM, a radio station in Logan, Utah, United States
- KUSU-TV, a former television station in Logan, Utah, United States
- Keele University Students' Union, a university students' union at Keele University, United Kingdom
- Kusu (goddess), a Mesopotamian deity associated with purification
- Kusu, an aged awamori, a drink native to Okinawa, Japan
- Kusu language, a Bantu language spoken in the Democratic Republic of the Congo

== See also ==
- Kusunoki (disambiguation)
