= Yeh Chu-mei =

Taiwanese sprinter

Personal information
- Nationality: Taiwanese
- Born: 葉 菊妹, Pinyin: Yè Jú-mèi; 12 June 1944 (age 81)

Sport
- Sport: Sprinting
- Event: 200 metres

Yeh Chu-mei (born 12 June 1944) is a Taiwanese sprinter. She competed in the 200 metres at the 1964 Summer Olympics and the 1968 Summer Olympics.
