= Shue Ming-shu =

Taiwanese cyclist

Personal information
- Full name: 許 明世, Pinyin: Xǔ Míng-shì
- Born: 15 June 1940 Hsinchu, Taiwan
- Died: 2000 (aged 59–60)
- Height: 172 cm (5 ft 8 in)
- Weight: 68 kg (150 lb)

Cycling career
- Sport: Cycling

Shue Ming-shu (15 June 1940 – 2000) was a Taiwanese cyclist. He competed at the 1964 and 1968 Summer Olympics.
