= Deng Chueng-hwai =

Taiwanese cyclist

Personal information
- Full name: 鄧 春淮, Pinyin: Dèng Chūn-huái
- Born: 18 November 1940 (age 85) Hsinchu, Taiwan

Cycling career
- Sport: Cycling

Deng Chueng-hwai (born 18 November 1940) is a former Taiwanese cyclist. He competed at the 1964 Summer Olympics and the 1968 Summer Olympics.
