= Shigeto Kusunoki =

Japanese sports shooter

Personal information
- Born: 28 December 1934 (age 91) Osaka, Japan

Sport
- Sport: Sports shooting

Shigeto Kusunoki (楠 成人, Kusunoki Shigeto; born 28 December 1934) is a Japanese former sports shooter. He competed in the 50 metre pistol event at the 1968 Summer Olympics.
