= Wu Ah-min =

Taiwanese athlete (born 1938)

Personal information
- Full name: 吳 阿民, Pinyin: wú ā mín
- Nationality: Taiwanese
- Born: 10 June 1938 (age 88) Guangfu, Hualien, Japanese Taiwan

Sport
- Sport: Athletics
- Event: Decathlon
Medal record
Representing Republic of China
Asian Games
Gold medal – first place	1966 Bangkok	Decathlon

Wu Ah-min (born 10 June 1938) is a Taiwanese athlete of Amis heritage. He was graduated from Taiwan Provincial Hualien Junior Teachers' College, and competed in the decathlon at the 1964 Summer Olympics and the 1968 Summer Olympics.
