= Shooting at the 2022 Asian Games – Men's 10 metre air pistol =

Men's 10 metre air pistol at the 2022 Asian Games
- Venue: Fuyang Yinhu Sports Centre
- Dates: 28 September 2023
- Competitors: 57 from 25 nations

Medalists
gold medal	Phạm Quang Huy	Vietnam
silver medal	Lee Won-ho	South Korea
bronze medal	Vladimir Svechnikov	Uzbekistan

The men's 10 metre air pistol competition at the 2022 Asian Games in Hangzhou, China was held on 28 September 2023 at Fuyang Yinhu Sports Centre.

== Schedule ==
All times are China Standard Time (UTC+08:00)

Date	Time	Event
Thursday, 28 September 2023	09:00	Qualification
Thursday, 28 September 2023	11:30	Final

== Records ==
Prior to this competition, the existing world, Asian and Games records were as follows.

Qualification
World Record	Jin Jong-oh (KOR)	594	Changwon, South Korea	12 April 2009
Asian Record	Jin Jong-oh (KOR)	594	Changwon, South Korea	12 April 2009
Games Record	Tan Zongliang (CHN)	590	Busan, South Korea	3 October 2002
Final
World Record	Kim Song-guk (PRK)	246.5	Doha, Qatar	11 November 2019
Asian Record	Kim Song-guk (PRK)	246.5	Doha, Qatar	11 November 2019
Games Record	Saurabh Chaudhary (IND)	240.7	Palembang, Indonesia	21 August 2018

== Results ==
Legend

- DNS — Did not start

=== Qualification ===
Rank	Athlete	Series						Total	Xs	Notes
Rank	Athlete	1	2	3	4	5	6	Total	Xs	Notes
1	Zhang Bowen (CHN)	98	97	93	97	99	98	582	22	
2	Lee Won-ho (KOR)	99	97	98	97	94	96	581	16	
3	Johnathan Wong (MAS)	97	97	98	96	99	93	580	22	
4	Phạm Quang Huy (VIE)	96	97	99	98	96	94	580	19	
5	Sarabjot Singh (IND)	95	95	97	98	97	98	580	18	
6	Vladimir Svechnikov (UZB)	98	99	98	95	95	94	579	25	
7	Atallah Al-Anazi (KSA)	94	99	97	98	96	95	579	16	
8	Arjun Singh Cheema (IND)	97	96	97	97	96	95	578	19	
9	Amir Joharikhoo (IRI)	94	96	97	97	98	96	578	13	
10	Phan Công Minh (VIE)	95	98	96	98	95	95	577	24	
11	Liu Jinyao (CHN)	94	97	95	97	97	97	577	22	
12	Kim Song-guk (PRK)	98	97	97	96	95	94	577	15	
13	Seiji Morikawa (JPN)	97	96	95	96	98	94	576	15	
14	Shiva Narwal (IND)	92	96	97	99	97	95	576	13	
15	Mukhammad Kamalov (UZB)	95	98	94	95	98	95	575	22	
16	Rim Ryu-song (PRK)	93	98	97	95	94	98	575	20	
17	Gulfam Joseph (PAK)	96	96	92	97	97	97	575	18	
18	Sajjad Pourhosseini (IRI)	95	98	95	94	96	97	575	18	
19	Kim Myong-un (PRK)	99	93	97	94	96	96	575	16	
20	Eldar Imankulov (KAZ)	96	95	94	96	95	99	575	15	
21	Enkhtaivany Davaakhüü (MGL)	92	97	95	96	97	98	575	13	
22	Muhamad Iqbal Raia Prabowo (INA)	92	97	95	94	98	98	574	21	
23	Xie Yu (CHN)	98	95	96	93	96	96	574	18	
24	Maxim Mazepa (KAZ)	94	96	94	96	97	97	574	14	
25	Lại Công Minh (VIE)	97	92	94	95	96	99	573	16	
26	Javad Foroughi (IRI)	96	93	95	95	97	97	573	15	
27	Veniamin Nikitin (UZB)	95	96	97	95	97	93	573	14	
28	Han Seung-woo (KOR)	98	96	95	95	95	93	572	16	
29	Valeriy Rakhimzhan (KAZ)	96	93	96	96	93	97	571	15	
30	Noppadon Sutiviruch (THA)	96	96	97	90	96	95	570	15	
31	Askat Tokmokov (KGZ)	95	98	95	94	96	92	570	12	
32	Wira Sukmana (INA)	96	93	95	96	96	93	569	18	
33	Peechnat Khlaisuban (THA)	92	95	94	94	97	97	569	12	
34	Hamad Al-Namshan (KUW)	96	93	95	95	96	94	569	11	
35	Ahmed Al-Ameeri (UAE)	96	96	94	92	96	93	567	14	
36	Koh Eun-suk (KOR)	92	95	97	95	91	95	565	16	
37	Pürevdorjiin Tergel (MGL)	92	92	94	94	96	97	565	14	
38	Ziyan Ziyau (MDV)	96	96	93	92	93	95	565	12	
39	Huang Wei-te (TPE)	97	94	93	94	93	94	565	11	
40	Shakil Ahmed (BAN)	93	91	95	94	96	95	564	11	
41	Safar Al-Dosari (KSA)	93	94	96	92	97	92	564	7	
42	Abdulla Al-Obaidli (QAT)	97	95	93	93	94	91	563	17	
43	Mehron Khojaev (TJK)	96	95	94	94	93	90	562	15	
44	Tatsura Banphaveerachon (THA)	93	96	94	93	93	92	561	14	
45	Osama Al-Shaiba (QAT)	94	94	88	96	94	95	561	10	
46	Alif Satria Bahari (INA)	92	93	94	92	93	96	560	14	
47	Saker Ahmed (BAN)	94	92	94	91	95	94	560	9	
48	Khaydarali Sattorov (TJK)	91	96	92	94	94	92	559	16	
49	Sit Chin Pok (MAC)	93	92	96	89	95	94	559	9	
50	Oyuny Tögöldör (MGL)	91	89	97	95	95	92	559	9	
51	Mohammed Al-Malki (KSA)	92	92	94	94	93	93	558	10	
52	Cheong Pok Ieong (MAC)	92	95	92	93	92	93	557	7	
53	Sabbir Al-Amin (BAN)	94	92	92	90	95	93	556	6	
54	Tandin Wangchuk (BHU)	88	92	87	89	90	90	536	6	
55	Pak Kam In (MAC)	85	90	93	96	88	83	535	11	
56	Ali Maahy (MDV)	88	86	90	85	90	93	532	5	
—	Ibrahim Khalil (UAE)							DNS		

=== Final ===
Rank	Athlete	1st stage		2nd stage – Elimination							S-off	Notes
Rank	Athlete	1	2	1	2	3	4	5	6	7	S-off	Notes
1st place, gold medalist(s)	Phạm Quang Huy (VIE)	49.1	99.6	119.3	140.2	160.8	181.1	201.1	220.9	240.5		
2nd place, silver medalist(s)	Lee Won-ho (KOR)	47.6	99.5	120.2	140.4	159.6	180.8	200.0	220.3	239.4		
3rd place, bronze medalist(s)	Vladimir Svechnikov (UZB)	49.5	99.6	120.2	141.0	159.9	180.6	200.2	219.9			
4	Sarabjot Singh (IND)	49.7	98.4	118.4	138.1	158.8	179.5	199.0				
5	Zhang Bowen (CHN)	49.1	99.0	119.7	139.4	158.8	178.3					
6	Johnathan Wong (MAS)	50.0	97.7	116.8	136.3	157.0						
7	Atallah Al-Anazi (KSA)	48.0	96.0	115.2	134.4							
8	Arjun Singh Cheema (IND)	47.8	95.7	113.3								
