= Shooting at the 2022 Asian Games – Mixed 10 metre air pistol team =

Mixed 10 metre air pistol team at the 2022 Asian Games
- Venue: Fuyang Yinhu Sports Centre
- Dates: 30 September 2023
- Competitors: 40 from 20 nations

Medalists
gold medal	Zhang Bowen; Jiang Ranxin	China
silver medal	Sarabjot Singh; Divya T. S.	India
bronze medal	Lee Won-ho; Kim Bo-mi	South Korea
bronze medal	Amir Joharikhoo; Hanieh Rostamian	Iran

The mixed 10 metre air rifle team competition at the 2022 Asian Games in Hangzhou, China was held on 30 September 2023 at Fuyang Yinhu Sports Centre.

== Schedule ==
All times are China Standard Time (UTC+08:00)

Date	Time	Event
Saturday, 30 September 2023	09:00	Qualification
Saturday, 30 September 2023	10:45	Bronze medal matches
Saturday, 30 September 2023	11:35	Gold medal match

== Records ==
Prior to this competition, the existing world, Asian and Games records were as follows.

World Record	India	587	Osijek, Croatia	26 June 2021
Asian Record	India	587	Osijek, Croatia	26 June 2021
Games Record	—	—	—	—

== Results ==
Legend

- DNS — Did not start

=== Qualification ===
Rank	Team	Series			Total	Xs	Notes
Rank	Team	1	2	3	Total	Xs	Notes
1	India (IND)	193	194	190	577	18	GR
	Sarabjot Singh	99	96	96	291	11	
	Divya T. S.	94	98	94	286	7	
2	China (CHN)	192	194	190	576	15	
	Zhang Bowen	98	96	96	290	6	
	Jiang Ranxin	94	98	94	286	9	
3	Iran (IRI)	191	193	191	575	18	
	Amir Joharikhoo	96	96	94	286	9	
	Hanieh Rostamian	95	97	97	289	9	
4	South Korea (KOR)	191	190	193	574	19	
	Lee Won-ho	96	97	97	290	9	
	Kim Bo-mi	95	93	96	284	10	
5	Japan (JPN)	191	187	196	574	15	
	Seiji Morikawa	95	93	99	287	8	
	Satoko Yamada	96	94	97	287	7	
6	Pakistan (PAK)	192	193	188	573	22	
	Gulfam Joseph	98	97	95	290	14	
	Kishmala Talat	94	96	93	283	8	
7	Malaysia (MAS)	190	190	193	573	15	
	Johnathan Wong	96	94	95	285	7	
	Nurul Syasya Nadiah Arifin	94	96	98	288	8	
8	Indonesia (INA)	191	190	191	572	16	
	Muhamad Iqbal Raia Prabowo	96	92	96	284	9	
	Arista Perdana Putri Darmoyo	95	98	95	288	7	
9	Mongolia (MGL)	191	190	189	570	16	
	Enkhtaivany Davaakhüü	98	96	94	288	12	
	Tsolmonbaataryn Anudari	93	94	95	282	4	
10	Vietnam (VIE)	191	189	189	569	16	
	Lại Công Minh	96	93	94	283	9	
	Trịnh Thu Vinh	95	96	95	286	7	
11	United Arab Emirates (UAE)	188	190	189	567	16	
	Ahmed Al-Ameeri	96	94	99	289	10	
	Ghaya Al-Shuhail	92	96	90	278	6	
12	Kazakhstan (KAZ)	187	187	193	567	12	
	Valeriy Rakhimzhan	98	93	98	289	9	
	Irina Yunusmetova	89	94	95	278	3	
13	Thailand (THA)	189	187	189	565	13	
	Noppadon Sutiviruch	96	95	95	286	8	
	Kamonlak Saencha	93	92	94	279	5	
14	Bangladesh (BAN)	187	185	190	562	9	
	Shakil Ahmed	92	93	95	280	2	
	Anjila Amjad Antu	95	92	95	282	7	
15	Chinese Taipei (TPE)	187	190	183	560	13	
	Huang Wei-te	92	93	93	278	5	
	Yu Ai-wen	95	97	90	282	8	
16	Macau (MAC)	188	188	184	560	10	
	Cheong Pok Ieong	93	94	92	279	7	
	Chao Mei Kam	95	94	92	281	3	
17	Uzbekistan (UZB)	186	189	179	554	5	
	Mukhammad Kamalov	92	95	98	285	3	
	Sitora Ergashboeva	94	94	81	269	2	
18	Qatar (QAT)	183	184	180	547	11	
	Osama Al-Shaiba	88	94	89	271	5	
	Nasra Mohammed	95	90	91	276	6	
19	Kuwait (KUW)	187	184	173	544	10	
	Hamad Al-Namshan	96	96	91	283	8	
	Amerah Awad	91	88	82	261	2	
—	Maldives (MDV)				DNS		
	Ziyan Ziyau				DNS		
	Fathmath Naura Ismaeel Shafeeq				DNS		

=== Finals ===
==== Bronze medal match 1 ====
Team	Score	1	2	3	4	5	6	7	8	9	10	11	12
South Korea (KOR)	16	20.2	20.1	18.7	18.9	20.3	20.2	19.6	19.7	20.0	19.9	19.8	20.0
Lee Won-ho		10.2	9.8	9.5	9.4	10.3	9.7	10.1	9.4	9.8	9.9	10.2	9.6
Kim Bo-mi		10.0	10.3	9.2	9.5	10.0	10.5	9.5	10.3	10.2	10.0	9.6	10.4
Japan (JPN)	8	19.9	20.1	19.9	17.1	17.1	19.4	16.9	19.2	20.2	19.9	20.4	19.3
Seiji Morikawa		10.6	10.2	9.9	9.4	9.7	9.3	8.6	10.3	9.9	10.0	10.1	9.5
Satoko Yamada		9.3	9.9	10.0	7.7	7.4	10.1	8.3	8.9	10.3	9.9	10.3	9.8

==== Bronze medal match 2 ====
Team	Score	1	2	3	4	5	6	7	8	9	10	11	12	13	14	15
Iran (IRI)	16	21.0	17.5	20.8	19.2	19.8	20.0	20.1	18.8	19.8	19.4	20.6	18.6	20.5	17.1	20.0
Amir Joharikhoo		10.5	8.3	10.1	10.6	10.0	10.6	9.9	9.3	10.8	9.9	10.0	8.5	10.0	7.3	10.3
Hanieh Rostamian		10.5	9.2	10.7	8.6	9.8	9.4	10.2	9.5	9.0	9.5	10.6	10.1	10.5	9.8	9.7
Pakistan (PAK)	14	18.2	20.1	19.7	20.8	19.8	20.2	20.1	20.5	19.2	19.0	19.8	19.8	20.1	19.9	19.6
Gulfam Joseph		9.5	9.5	9.4	10.4	9.1	10.0	9.5	9.8	9.8	10.7	9.8	9.8	9.9	10.4	9.5
Kishmala Talat		8.7	10.6	10.3	10.4	10.7	10.2	10.6	10.7	9.4	8.3	10.0	10.0	10.2	9.5	10.1

==== Gold medal match ====
Team	Score	1	2	3	4	5	6	7	8	9	10	11	12	13	14	15
China (CHN)	16	19.7	19.5	19.8	20.3	18.7	20.5	19.8	20.0	20.3	20.7	20.7	20.7	20.3	20.3	21.0
Zhang Bowen		9.9	10.3	9.8	10.3	9.4	10.0	10.5	10.5	9.7	10.7	10.6	10.5	10.3	10.4	10.7
Jiang Ranxin		9.8	9.2	10.0	10.0	9.3	10.5	9.3	9.5	10.6	10.0	10.1	10.2	10.0	9.9	10.3
India (IND)	14	19.8	20.0	19.8	19.4	20.8	19.3	19.5	21.0	21.1	20.6	19.8	20.5	20.4	20.3	20.4
Sarabjot Singh		9.4	9.9	10.1	9.5	10.5	9.6	10.2	10.2	10.6	10.1	9.5	10.2	10.1	10.0	9.9
Divya T. S.		10.4	10.1	9.7	9.9	10.3	9.7	9.3	10.8	10.5	10.5	10.3	10.3	10.3	10.3	10.5
