= Shooting at the 2024 Summer Olympics – Mixed 10 metre air pistol team =

Mixed 10 metre air pistol team at the Games of the XXXIII Olympiad
- Venue: National Shooting Centre, Châteauroux
- Date: 29–30 July 2024
- Competitors: 34 from 12 nations
- Teams: 17

Medalists
1st place, gold medalist(s)		Damir Mikec; Zorana Arunović	Serbia
2nd place, silver medalist(s)		Yusuf Dikeç; Şevval İlayda Tarhan	Turkey
3rd place, bronze medalist(s)		Sarabjot Singh; Manu Bhaker	India

The Mixed 10 meter air pistol team event at the 2024 Summer Olympics took place on 29–30 July 2024 at the National Shooting Centre, Châteauroux.

== Schedule ==
All times are Central European Time (UTC+2)

Date	Time	Round
Monday, July 29	09:15	Qualification
Tuesday, July 30	09:30	Bronze medal match
Tuesday, July 30	10:00	Gold medal match

== Results ==
=== Qualification ===
Rank	Athletes	Nation	Series			Total	Notes
Rank	Athletes	Nation	1	2	3	Total	Notes
1	Şevval İlayda Tarhan	Turkey 2	97	97	97	582-18	QG
1	Yusuf Dikeç	Turkey 2	99	98	94	582-18	QG
2	Zorana Arunović	Serbia	97	98	97	581-24	QG
2	Damir Mikec	Serbia	95	98	96	581-24	QG
3	Manu Bhaker	India 1	98	98	95	580-20	QB
3	Sarabjot Singh	India 1	95	97	97	580-20	QB
4	Oh Ye-jin	South Korea 1	97	98	94	579-18	QB
4	Lee Won-ho	South Korea 1	97	96	97	579-18	QB
5	Li Xue	China 2	96	96	98	578-19	
5	Zhang Bowen	China 2	98	94	96	578-19	
6	Josefin Eder	Germany 2	96	92	96	577-21	
6	Christian Reitz	Germany 2	98	98	97	577-21	
7	Kim Ye-ji	South Korea 2	99	98	96	577-16	
7	Cho Yeong-jae	South Korea 2	93	94	97	577-16	
8	Jiang Ranxin	China 1	96	95	95	576-20	
8	Xie Yu	China 1	96	99	95	576-20	
9	Doreen Vennekamp	Germany 1	96	95	96	576-16	
9	Robin Walter	Germany 1	96	97	96	576-16	
10	Rhythm Sangwan	India 2	97	99	92	576-14	
10	Arjun Singh Cheema	India 2	97	93	98	576-14	
11	Irina Yunusmetova	Kazakhstan	95	95	94	575-19	
11	Nikita Chiryukin	Kazakhstan	93	98	100	575-19	
12	Antoaneta Kostadinova	Bulgaria	97	93	98	574-19	
12	Kiril Kirov	Bulgaria	97	94	95	574-19	
13	Olena Kostevych	Ukraine	96	93	96	572-19	
13	Viktor Bankin	Ukraine	93	97	97	572-19	
14	Kishmala Talat	Pakistan	97	97	93	571-17	
14	Gulfam Joseph	Pakistan	92	98	94	571-17	
15	Şimal Yılmaz	Turkey 1	96	91	96	569-24	
15	İsmail Keleş	Turkey 1	94	95	97	569-24	
16	Agate Rašmane	Latvia	93	95	92	568-13	
16	Lauris Strautmanis	Latvia	94	97	97	568-13	
17	Camille Jedrzejewski	France	96	93	96	565-17	
17	Florian Fouquet	France	91	93	96	565-17	

=== Finals ===
Rank	Country	Athletes	Shots															Points
Gold medal match
1st place, gold medalist(s)	Serbia	Zorana Arunović	8.9	10.2	9.2	10.6	8.5	10.5	10.2	9.9	10.8	10.5	9.6	10.0	10.0	10.8	9.4	16
1st place, gold medalist(s)	Serbia	Damir Mikec	10.1	9.6	10.3	10.1	9.0	9.7	10.3	9.2	9.3	9.9	10.2	10.0	10.0	10.5	10.7	16
1st place, gold medalist(s)	Serbia	Shots Total	19.0	19.8	19.5	20.7	17.5	20.2	20.5	19.1	20.1	20.4	19.8	20.0	20.0	21.3	20.1	16
2nd place, silver medalist(s)	Turkey 2	Şevval İlayda Tarhan	9.3	9.6	9.4	10.7	9.3	9.3	10.1	10.4	10.0	10.2	7.3	10.0	9.9	9.7	10.2	14
2nd place, silver medalist(s)	Turkey 2	Yusuf Dikeç	9.0	10.3	10.2	10.6	10.1	10.6	9.9	10.5	9.2	9.5	10.8	10.7	10.4	10.6	9.1	14
2nd place, silver medalist(s)	Turkey 2	Shots Total	18.3	19.9	19.6	21.3	19.4	19.9	20.0	20.9	19.2	19.7	18.1	20.7	20.3	20.3	19.3	14
Bronze medal match
3rd place, bronze medalist(s)	India 1	Manu Bhaker	10.2	10.7	10.4	10.7	10.5	10.0	10.6	8.3	10.0	10.5	9.6	10.6	9.4	—		16
3rd place, bronze medalist(s)	India 1	Sarabjot Singh	8.6	10.5	10.4	10.0	9.6	10.2	9.4	10.2	10.5	10.3	9.7	10.2	10.2	—		16
3rd place, bronze medalist(s)	India 1	Shots Total	18.8	21.2	20.8	20.7	20.1	20.2	20.0	18.5	20.5	20.8	19.3	20.8	19.6	—		16
4	South Korea 1	Oh Ye-jin	10.4	10.0	9.1	9.9	9.8	9.8	9.9	10.4	9.7	9.6	9.0	10.2	9.5	—		10
4	South Korea 1	Lee Won-ho	10.1	9.9	10.7	10.6	9.7	10.8	9.8	10.3	10.7	9.8	10.8	10.8	9.0	—		10
4	South Korea 1	Shots Total	20.5	19.9	19.8	20.5	19.5	20.6	19.7	20.7	20.4	19.4	19.8	21.0	18.5	—		10
