= Shooting at the 2022 Asian Games – Men's 10 metre air pistol team =

Men's 10 metre air pistol team at the 2022 Asian Games
- Venue: Fuyang Yinhu Sports Centre
- Dates: 28 September 2023
- Competitors: 42 from 14 nations

Medalists
gold medal	India; Arjun Singh Cheema, Shiva Narwal, Sarabjot Singh
silver medal	China; Liu Jinyao, Xie Yu, Zhang Bowen
bronze medal	Vietnam; Lại Công Minh, Phạm Quang Huy, Phan Công Minh

The men's 10 metre air pistol team competition at the 2022 Asian Games in Hangzhou, China was held on 28 September 2023 at Fuyang Yinhu Sports Centre.

== Schedule ==
All times are China Standard Time (UTC+08:00)

Date	Time	Event
Thursday, 28 September 2023	09:00	Final

== Records ==
Prior to this competition, the existing world, Asian and Games records were as follows.

World Record	Russia	1759	Deauville, France	16 March 2007
Asian Record	China	1759	Kuwait City, Kuwait	9 March 2014
Games Record	China	1750	Busan, South Korea	3 October 2002

== Results ==
Rank	Team	Series						Total	Xs	Notes
Rank	Team	1	2	3	4	5	6	Total	Xs	Notes
1st place, gold medalist(s)	India (IND)	284	287	291	294	290	288	1734	50	
	Arjun Singh Cheema	97	96	97	97	96	95	578	19	
	Shiva Narwal	92	96	97	99	97	95	576	13	
	Sarabjot Singh	95	95	97	98	97	98	580	18	
2nd place, silver medalist(s)	China (CHN)	290	289	284	287	292	291	1733	62	
	Liu Jinyao	94	97	95	97	97	97	577	22	
	Xie Yu	98	95	96	93	96	96	574	18	
	Zhang Bowen	98	97	93	97	99	98	582	22	
3rd place, bronze medalist(s)	Vietnam (VIE)	288	287	289	291	287	288	1730	59	
	Lại Công Minh	97	92	94	95	96	99	573	16	
	Phạm Quang Huy	96	97	99	98	96	94	580	19	
	Phan Công Minh	95	98	96	98	95	95	577	24	
4	Uzbekistan (UZB)	288	293	289	285	290	282	1727	61	
	Mukhammad Kamalov	95	98	94	95	98	95	575	22	
	Veniamin Nikitin	95	96	97	95	97	93	573	14	
	Vladimir Svechnikov	98	99	98	95	95	94	579	25	
5	North Korea (PRK)	290	288	291	285	285	288	1727	51	
	Kim Myong-un	99	93	97	94	96	96	575	16	
	Kim Song-guk	98	97	97	96	95	94	577	15	
	Rim Ryu-song	93	98	97	95	94	98	575	20	
6	Iran (IRI)	285	287	287	286	291	290	1726	46	
	Javad Foroughi	96	93	95	95	97	97	573	15	
	Amir Joharikhoo	94	96	97	97	98	96	578	13	
	Sajjad Pourhosseini	95	98	95	94	96	97	575	18	
7	Kazakhstan (KAZ)	286	284	284	288	285	293	1720	44	
	Eldar Imankulov	96	95	94	96	95	99	575	15	
	Maxim Mazepa	94	96	94	96	97	97	574	14	
	Valeriy Rakhimzhan	96	93	96	96	93	97	571	15	
8	South Korea (KOR)	289	288	290	287	280	284	1718	48	
	Han Seung-woo	98	96	95	95	95	93	572	16	
	Koh Eun-suk	92	95	97	95	91	95	565	16	
	Lee Won-ho	99	97	98	97	94	96	581	16	
9	Indonesia (INA)	280	283	284	282	287	287	1703	53	
	Alif Satria Bahari	92	93	94	92	93	96	560	14	
	Muhamad Iqbal Raia Prabowo	92	97	95	94	98	98	574	21	
	Wira Sukmana	96	93	95	96	96	93	569	18	
10	Saudi Arabia (KSA)	279	285	287	284	286	280	1701	33	
	Atallah Al-Anazi	94	99	97	98	96	95	579	16	
	Safar Al-Dosari	93	94	96	92	97	92	564	7	
	Mohammed Al-Malki	92	92	94	94	93	93	558	10	
11	Thailand (THA)	281	287	285	277	286	284	1700	41	
	Tatsura Banphaveerachon	93	96	94	93	93	92	561	14	
	Peechnat Khlaisuban	92	95	94	94	97	97	569	12	
	Noppadon Sutiviruch	96	96	97	90	96	95	570	15	
12	Mongolia (MGL)	275	278	286	285	288	287	1699	36	
	Enkhtaivany Davaakhüü	92	97	95	96	97	98	575	13	
	Pürevdorjiin Tergel	92	92	94	94	96	97	565	14	
	Oyuny Tögöldör	91	89	97	95	95	92	559	9	
13	Bangladesh (BAN)	281	275	281	275	286	282	1680	26	
	Saker Ahmed	94	92	94	91	95	94	560	9	
	Shakil Ahmed	93	91	95	94	96	95	564	11	
	Sabbir Al-Amin	94	92	92	90	95	93	556	6	
14	Macau (MAC)	270	277	281	278	275	270	1651	27	
	Cheong Pok Ieong	92	95	92	93	92	93	557	7	
	Pak Kam In	85	90	93	96	88	83	535	11	
	Sit Chin Pok	93	92	96	89	95	94	559	9	
