= India at the 2024 Summer Olympics =

- IOC code: IND
- NOC: Indian Olympic Committee
- Website: olympic.ind.in

in Paris, France 26 July 2024 – 11 August 2024
- Competitors: 110 (65 men and 45 women) in 16 sports
- Flag bearers (opening): P. V. Sindhu; Sharath Kamal
- Flag bearers (closing): Manu Bhaker; P. R. Sreejesh
- Medals Ranked 71st: Gold 0 Silver 1 Bronze 5 Total 6

Summer Olympics appearances (overview)
- 1900; 1904–1912; 1920; 1924; 1928; 1932; 1936; 1948; 1952; 1956; 1960; 1964; 1968; 1972; 1976; 1980; 1984; 1988; 1992; 1996; 2000; 2004; 2008; 2012; 2016; 2020; 2024; 2028

Other related appearances
- Pakistan (1948–pres.); Bangladesh (1984–pres.)

India competed at the 2024 Summer Olympics in Paris, France, held from 26 July to 11 August 2024. The country made its debut at the 1900 Summer Olympics. Indian athletes have appeared at every edition of the Summer Olympic Games since 1920 and the Paris Games edition marked India's 26th appearance at the Summer Olympics.

The Indian contingent consisted of 110 athletes who competed in 16 sports. P.V. Sindhu and Sharath Kamal were the flag-bearers for the opening ceremony. Manu Bhaker and P. R. Sreejesh carried the Indian flag during the closing ceremony.

India won six medals including a silver and five bronze to be ranked 71st amongst the 206 NOCs that participated in the Olympics. This was India's third-best medal haul after the 2020 and 2012 respectively. Manu Bhaker won two bronze medals in shooting and became the first Indian to win two medals in a single Olympics since India gained independence. Neeraj Chopra, who won a silver medal in the men's javelin throw event, became the first Indian individual medalist to win a gold and silver at the Olympics. Wrestler Aman Sehrawat, who won a bronze medal became the youngest ever Indian medal winner in the Olympics.

== Background ==
The Indian Olympic Association was recognized by the International Olympic Committee in 1927. However, by this time, the nation had already made its first Summer Olympics debut at the 1900 Olympics in Paris and had competed in Olympic Games of 1920 and 1924. Indian athletes have appeared at every edition of the Summer Olympic Games since 1920 and this edition of the Games marked the nation's 26th appearance at the Summer Olympics.

The Indian contingent for this year's games consisted of 117 athletes: 110 competitors and 7 alternate, in addition to 118 support staff and 22 officials. Gagan Narang was appointed as the Chef de mission aka head of mission while Shiva Keshavan was chosen as his deputy.

P.V. Sindhu and Sharath Kamal were the flag-bearers for the opening ceremony of Paris 2024. Shooter Manu Bhaker, who won two medals at the edition, and the field hockey team's goalkeeper P. R. Sreejesh were the flag bearers for the closing ceremony.

== Medal summary ==
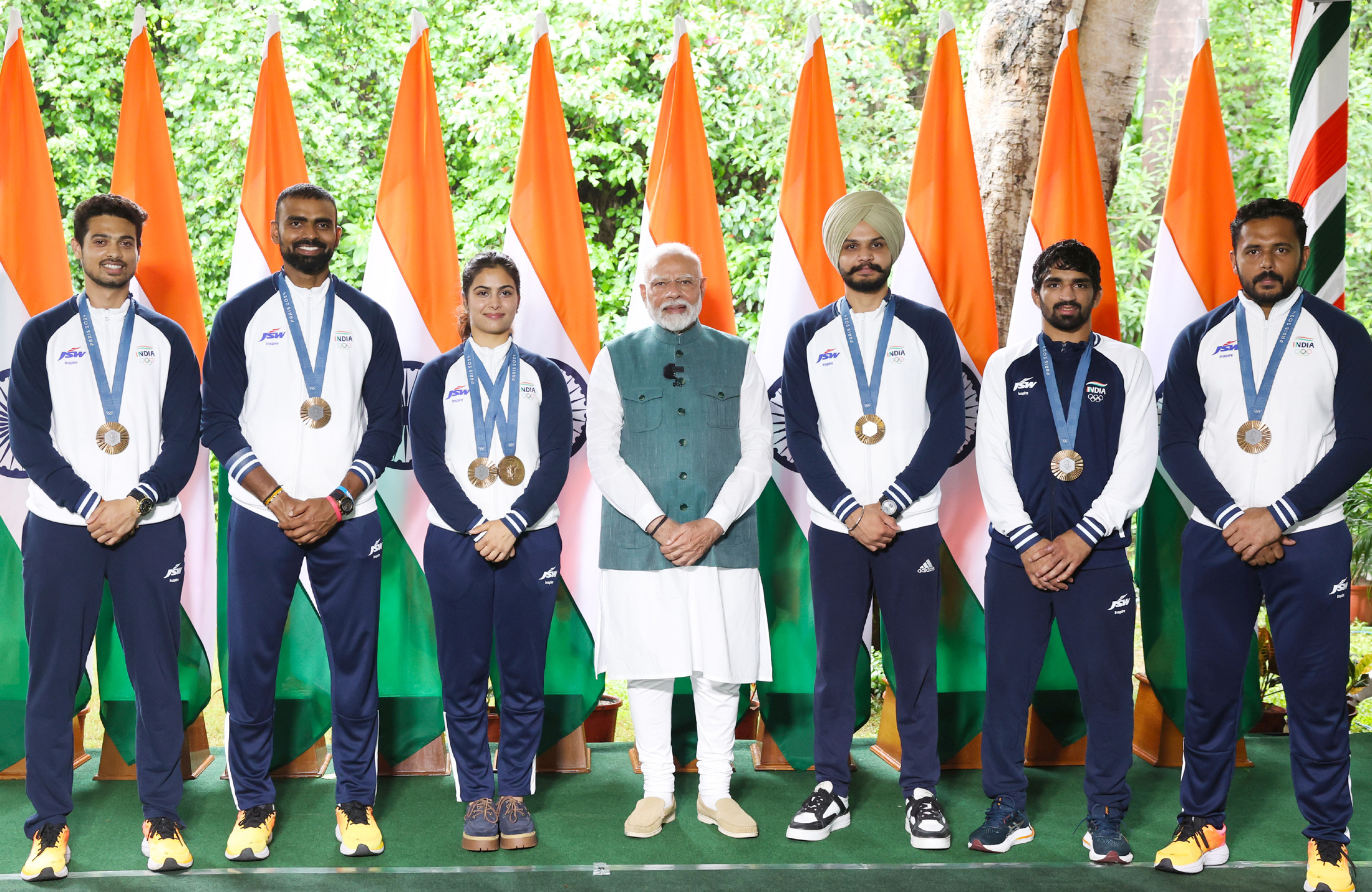
Indian Prime Minister Narendra Modi (centre) with the medalists. Left to right: Swapnil Kusale, P. R. Sreejesh, Manu Bhaker, Sarabjot Singh, Aman Sehrawat, and Harmanpreet Singh.

India won six medals in total including one silver and five bronze, three of which come from shooting. This was India's joint second highest total medal haul after the previous Games. Manu Bhaker won the first medal for India in the women's 10 m air pistol event. She won a bronze medal and became the first woman shooter to win an Olympic medal for India. In the mixed 10 m air pistol team event, she partnered with Sarabjot Singh to win another bronze medal, thus becoming the first Indian since independence to win two medals in a single Olympics. Swapnil Kusale then won another bronze medal in the men's 50 m rifle three positions event. This became India's seventh shooting medal across the Olympic Games.

The men's field hockey team won the bronze medal in the men's event after they defeated Spain in the match for the third place. This was the country's second consecutive bronze in men's hockey at the Olympics. Neeraj Chopra then won a silver medal in the men's javelin throw event. With his gold medal in the 2020 Olympics, he became the fifth individual multiple medalist for India and first to win a gold and silver combination. Aman Sehrawat won a bronze medal for India in the men's freestyle 57kg wrestling event. The 21-year-old became the youngest Indian to win an Olympic medal.

Medals by sport
Sport	Gold	Silver	Bronze	Total
Athletics	0	1	0	1
Shooting	0	0	3	3
Field hockey	0	0	1	1
Wrestling	0	0	1	1
Total	0	1	5	6

Medals by day
Day	Date	Gold	Silver	Bronze	Total
1	27 July	0	0	0	0
2	28 July	0	0	1	1
3	29 July	0	0	0	0
4	30 July	0	0	1	1
5	31 July	0	0	0	0
6	1 August	0	0	1	1
7	2 August	0	0	0	0
8	3 August	0	0	0	0
9	4 August	0	0	0	0
10	5 August	0	0	0	0
11	6 August	0	0	0	0
12	7 August	0	0	0	0
13	8 August	0	1	1	2
14	9 August	0	0	1	1
	Total	0	1	5	6

Medals by gender
Gender	Gold	Silver	Bronze	Total
Male	0	1	3	4
Female	0	0	1	1
Mixed	0	0	1	1
Total	0	1	5	6

Multiple medalists
Name	Event	1st place, gold medalist(s)	2nd place, silver medalist(s)	3rd place, bronze medalist(s)	Total
Manu Bhaker	Shooting	0	0	2	2

=== Medalists ===
Medal	Name	Sport	Event	Date
(silver) Silver	Neeraj Chopra	Athletics	Men's javelin throw	8 August
(bronze) Bronze	Manu Bhaker	Shooting	Women's 10 m air pistol	28 July
(bronze) Bronze	Manu Bhaker; Sarabjot Singh	Shooting	Mixed 10 m air pistol team	30 July
(bronze) Bronze	Swapnil Kusale	Shooting	Men's 50 m rifle three positions	1 August
(bronze) Bronze	India men's national field hockey team: Jarmanpreet Singh; Abhishek Nain; Manpreet Singh; Hardik Singh; Gurjant Singh; Sanjay Rana; Mandeep Singh; Harmanpreet Singh; Lalit Upadhyay; P. R. Sreejesh; Sumit Walmiki; Shamsher Singh; Raj Kumar Pal; Amit Rohidas; Vivek Prasad; Sukhjeet Singh	Field hockey	Men's tournament	8 August
(bronze) Bronze	Aman Sehrawat	Wrestling	Men's freestyle 57 kg	9 August

== Competitors ==
There were 110 athletes who took part in the medal events across 16 sports.

Sport	Men	Women	Athletes
Archery	3	3	6
Athletics (Note: excludes the seven alternate athletes: 2 in athletics, 3 in hockey and 2 in table tennis, who are part of the contingent)	17	10	27
Badminton	4	3	7
Boxing	2	4	6
Equestrian	1	0	1
Field hockey	16	0	16
Golf	2	2	4
Judo	0	1	1
Rowing	1	0	1
Sailing	1	1	2
Shooting	10	11	21
Swimming	1	1	2
Table tennis	3	3	6
Tennis	3	0	3
Weightlifting	0	1	1
Wrestling	1	5	6
Total	65	45	110

== Archery ==
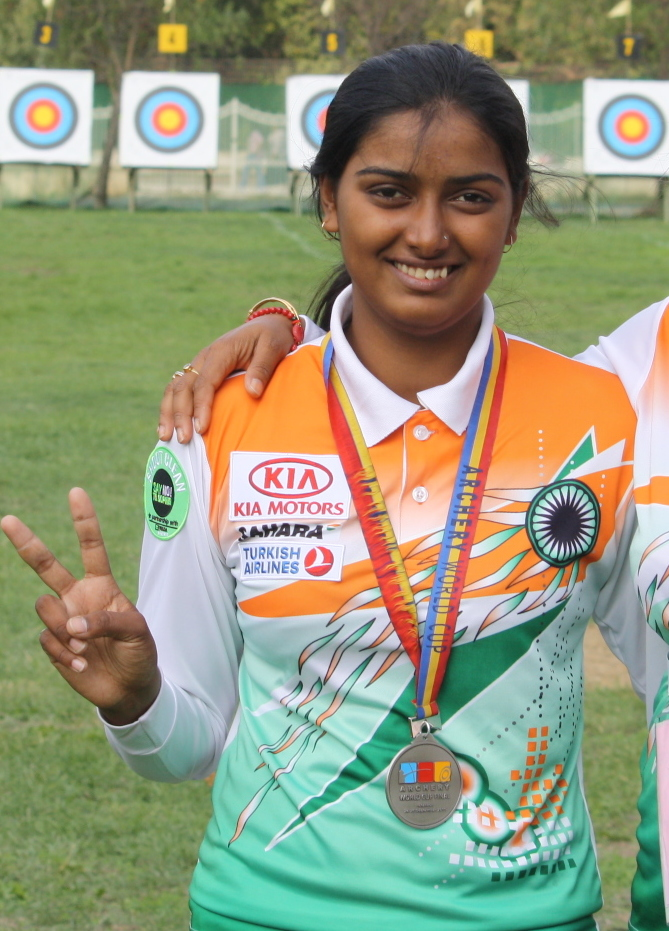
Deepika Kumari participated in the fourth consecutive Olympics and made it to the quarterfinals of the women's individual event.

As per the qualification system drawn up by the World Archery Federation, each National Olympic Committee (NOC) was permitted to enter a maximum of six competitors, three per gender. NOCs that qualify teams for a particular gender are able to send a three-member team to the team event and also have each member compete in the individual event with the remaining spots filled by individual qualification tournaments. The qualification for the team event was determined by various qualification tournaments and world archery rankings. The Indian men's and women's team qualified for the men's and women's team events respectively as one of the two best ranked teams that had not already qualified in the respective categories.

Dhiraj Bommadevara had secured a place in the men's individual event at the Asian qualifiers in Bangkok and Bhajan Kaur had obtained a quota place for the women's individual event at the World qualifiers held at Antalya. As India qualified for both the team events, India was eligible to send six archers and the individual places were re-allocated to other NOCs. The Indian archery squad for the Games consisted of Bommadevara, Pravin Jadhav, and Tarundeep Rai in the men's team and Kaur, Deepika Kumari, and Ankita Bhakat in the women's team with Rai and Kumari participating in their fourth Olympic Games.

The ranking rounds for the archery events were held at the Les Invalides on 25 July. In the men's individual ranking rounds, Bommadevara was the highest placed Indian in fourth place with 681 points followed by Rai in 14th and Jadhav in 39th. Their combined score resulted in a third seeding for the team event and a direct entry to the quarterfinals. Bhakat was the highest ranked Indian in the women's individual event after she qualified in 11th with 666 points followed by Kaur in 22nd and Kumari in 23rd. Their combined score resulted in a fourth seeding for the team event. Bommadevara and Bhakat combined to be ranked at the fifth spot in the qualification for the mixed team event.

Men

In the men's team event, the third seeded Indian team lost to the lower seeded Turkey in the quarterfinals. The Indian team lost the first two sets before they won a closely contested third set by a score of 55–54. But the Turkish team won the fourth set easily to win the match and send India out of the competition. In the men's individual events, Jadhav and Rai did not progress beyond the round of 32 after they lost their initial bouts. Bommadevara won his first round match before he lost in the round of 16 to Eric Peters of Canada in a closely contested match, which ended in the Indian losing in a single arrow shoot-off.

Athlete	Event	Ranking round		Round of 64	Round of 32	Round of 16	Quarterfinals	Semifinals	Final / BM	
Athlete	Event	Score	Seed	Opposition Score	Opposition Score	Opposition Score	Opposition Score	Opposition Score	Opposition Score	Rank
Dhiraj Bommadevara	Individual	681	4	Li (CZE); W 7–1	Peters (CAN); L 5–6	Did not advance				
Tarundeep Rai	Individual	674	14	T Hall (GBR); L 4–6	Did not advance					
Pravin Jadhav	Individual	658	39	Kao (CHN); L 0–6	Did not advance					
Dhiraj Bommadevara; Tarundeep Rai; Pravin Jadhav	Team	2013	3	—N/a		Bye	Turkey; L 2–6	Did not advance		

Women

In the women's team event, the higher seeded Indian team lost to 12th seeded Netherlands in the quarterfinals by a score of 0–6 after losing the first three sets. In the women's individual event, Bhakat was eliminated in the first round by Wioleta Myszor of Poland. Kaur won her first round match against Indonesia's Syifa Kamal before she beat the Polish archer Myszor in the next round by a score of 6–0. In the round of 32, she faced off against Diananda Choirunisa of Indonesia. Both of them traded alternate sets in a match that ended in a tie and the Indonesian prevailed in the final shoot-off for the match.

Kumari won her first two rounds to progress through to the round of 16. In the first round, she trailed the Estonian archer Reena Pärnat 3–5 before the scores were leveled. In the shoot-off, the Indian won to progress to the next round, where she defeated Quinty Roeffen of Netherlands easily by a score of 6–2. In the next round, she raced to 5–1 lead before prevailing against German Michelle Kroppen in a close contest by a score of 6–4. In the quarterfinals, she lost another close match against reigning Olympic silver medalist Nam Su-hyeon of South Korea. Both the competitors traded the first four sets alternatively before the Korean took the decisive fifth set that ended Kumari's participation.

Athlete	Event	Ranking round		Round of 64	Round of 32	Round of 16	Quarterfinals	Semifinals	Final / BM	
Athlete	Event	Score	Seed	Opposition Score	Opposition Score	Opposition Score	Opposition Score	Opposition Score	Opposition Score	Rank
Bhajan Kaur	Individual	659	22	Kamal (INA); W 7–3	Myszor (POL); W 6–0	Choirunisa (INA); L 5–6	Did not advance			
Ankita Bhakat	Individual	666	11	Myszor (POL); L 4–6	Did not advance					
Deepika Kumari	Individual	658	23	Pärnat (EST); W 6–5	Roeffen (NED); W 6–2	Kroppen (GER); W 6–4	Nam (KOR); L 4–6	Did not advance		
Bhajan Kaur; Deepika Kumari; Ankita Bhakat	Team	1983	4	—N/a		Bye	Netherlands; L 0–6	Did not advance		

Mixed

In the mixed team event, Bommadevara and Bhakat progressed to the quarterfinals with an easy victory over Indonesia and beat Spain in the next round. In the semifinals, they lost to the top ranked pair of Lim Si-hyeon and Kim Woo-jin by a 2–6 score line. In the bronze medal match, they lost by a similar score to third seeded Casey Kaufhold and Brady Ellison to miss out on a medal.

Athlete	Event	Ranking round		Round of 16	Quarterfinals	Semifinals	Final / BM	
Athlete	Event	Score	Seed	Opposition Score	Opposition Score	Opposition Score	Opposition Score	Rank
Dhiraj Bommadevara; Ankita Bhakat	Team	1347	5 Q	Indonesia; W 5–1	Spain; W 5–3	South Korea; L 2–6	United States; L 2–6	4

Legend: W = Win; L = Loss

== Athletics ==
As per the governing body World Athletics (WA), a NOC was allowed to enter up to three qualified athletes in each individual event and one qualified relay team if the Olympic Qualifying Standards (OQS) had been met during the qualifying period at the events approved by WA. The remaining places are allocated based on the World Athletics Rankings which were derived from the average of the best five results for an athlete over the designated qualifying period, weighted by the importance of the meet. The qualification window for the marathon races was from 1 November 2022 to 30 April 2024; for the 10,000 metres, combined events (heptathlon and decathlon), racewalks, and relays from 31 December 2022 to 30 June 2024; and for the remaining events on the program from 1 July 2023 to 30 June 2024. Each NOC was allowed five athletes for the relay events as provided by the qualification system.

India achieved six quotas for track events, five for road events, ten for field events apart from two relay teams. Murali Sreeshankar, who had secured a quota for the Men's Long Jump after recording a jump of 8.37m at the 2023 Asian Athletics Championships in Bangkok, withdrew from the games due to an injury. Abha Khatua qualified for the women's shot put event but was left out of the final contingent for unknown reasons. The final Indian contingent for the Games consisted of 28 athletes including 23 track and field athletes competing in 16 disciplines.

Track events

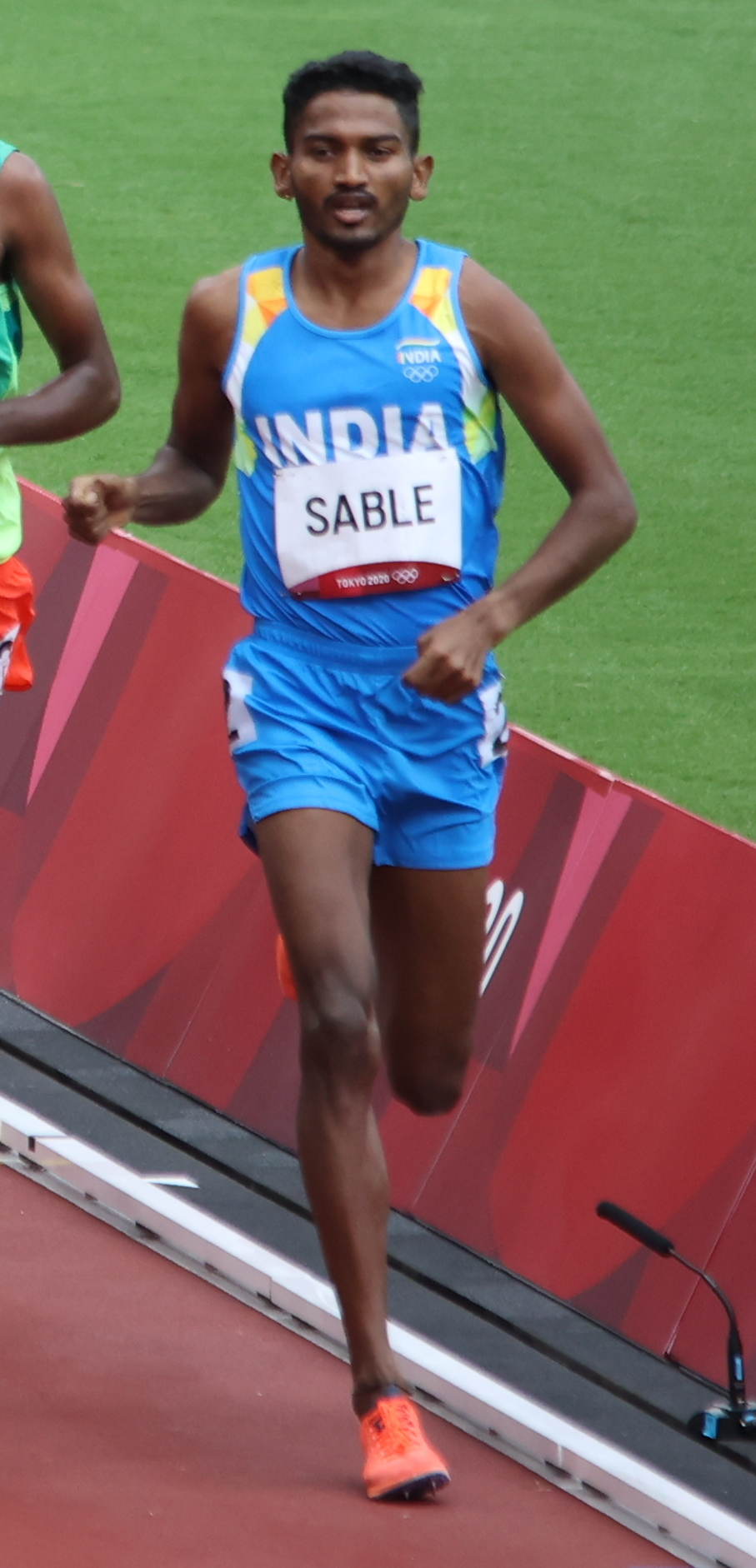
Avinash Sable became the first Indian athlete to qualify for the final of men's 3000 m steeplechase event.

Parul Chaudhary recorded her season's best times in Women's 3000 m steeplechase and Women's 5000 m events, however, she failed to make it to the finals of either event. In the women's 400 m, Kiran Pahal finished seventh in her heat and then last in the repechage round, therefore failing to qualify for the final. Jyothi Yarraji, who became the first Indian sprinter to compete in the women's 100 m hurdles at Olympics, finished seventh in her heat with a time of 13.16 seconds, nearly half a second off her best of 12.78. She finished 35th overall amongst the 40 runners in the competition and therefore failed to qualify directly for the final. In the repechage round, she finished fourth with a similar time of 13.17 and failed to qualify for the final.

Avinash Sable finished fifth in the men's 3000 m steeplechase qualification heat to qualify for the final, becoming the first Indian athlete to qualify for the final of this event. In the final, he started well and led the pack in the first lap. But as the race progressed, he fell back out of the medal places. Eventually, he registered an 11th-place finish in the final classification with a time of 8:14.18, nearly five seconds off from his national record mark of 8:09.91.

Athlete	Event	Heat		Repechage		Semifinal		Final	
Athlete	Event	Result	Rank	Result	Rank	Result	Rank	Result	Rank
Jyothi Yarraji	Women's 100m hurdles	13.16	7	13.17	4	Did not advance			
Kiran Pahal	Women's 400m	52.51	7	52.59	6	Did not advance			
Avinash Sable	Men's 3000 m steeplechase	8:15.43	5 Q	—N/a				8:14.18	11
Ankita Dhyani	Women's 5000 m	16:19.38	20	—N/a				Did not advance	
Parul Chaudhary	Women's 5000 m	15:10:68 SB	14	—N/a				Did not advance	
Parul Chaudhary	Women's 3000 m steeplechase	9:23.39 SB	8	—N/a				Did not advance	
Amoj Jacob; Muhammad Ajmal; Muhammed Anas; Rajesh Ramesh	Men's 4 × 400 metres relay	3:00.58 SB	4	—N/a				Did not advance	
Jyothika Sri Dandi; M. R. Poovamma; Subha Venkatesan; Vithya Ramraj	Women's 4 × 400 metres relay	3:32.51	8	—N/a				Did not advance	

Road events

Athlete	Event	Final	
Athlete	Event	Result	Rank
Akshdeep Singh	Men's 20 km walk	DNF	
Vikash Singh	Men's 20 km walk	1:22:36	30
Paramjeet Singh Bisht	Men's 20 km walk	1:23:46	37
Priyanka Goswami	Women's 20 km walk	1:39:55	41
Priyanka Goswami; Suraj Panwar	Marathon race walking mixed relay	DNF	

Field events

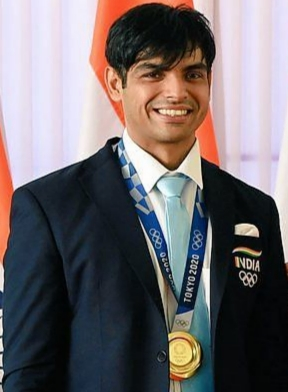
Neeraj Chopra, who won India's first individual gold medal in the athletics in 2020, won a silver in the men's javelin throw event.

In the qualification for the men's javelin throw event, reigning champion Neeraj Chopra recorded a season's best of 89.34 m in his first throw to top the table. He secured a direct entry to the finals as the mark was well above the direct qualification standard set at 84 m. In the same event, Kishore Jena recorded a best throw of 80.73 m but failed to qualify and had to exit. In the final, he recorded his only legitimate throw of 89.45 m in the second attempt. The mark was enough to secure only a silver medal behind Pakistan's Arshad Nadeem, who secured the gold with an Olympic record throw of 92.97 m.

In the other field events, Asian champion Tajinderpal Singh Toor threw a best of 18.05 m, way below his best of 21.77 m in the men's shot put event. He finished 29th amongst the 31 athletes and failed to qualify for the finals. Jeswin Aldrin fouled his first two jumps before setting a low 7.61 m in the men's long jump event to finish 26th and failed to make it to the finals. In the men's high jump, Sarvesh Kushare finished 13th in his group with a jump of 2.15 m and failed to make it out of the qualification stage. Kushare, whose best is 2.25 m, failed to clear a lower mark of 2.20 m in three attempts. In the women's javelin throw event, Asian Games champion Annu Rani finished 15th in Group A and failed to qualify for the final. She had a best throw of 55.81 m, way below her national record mark of 63.82 m and finished 20th amongst a field of 23 athletes. In the men's triple jump, Abdulla Aboobacker and Praveen Chithravel finished 21st and 26th respectively in the qualification rounds and failed to make it to the finals. Both the jumpers who had a best personal mark of over 17 m, jumped way below their personal bests, with Aboobacker recording a best jump of 16.49 m and Chithravel recording 16.25 m.

Athlete	Event	Qualification		Final	
Athlete	Event	Distance	Rank	Distance	Rank
Sarvesh Kushare	Men's high jump	2.15	25	Did not advance	
Jeswin Aldrin	Men's long jump	7.61	26	Did not advance	
Abdulla Aboobacker	Men's triple jump	16.49	21	Did not advance	
Praveen Chithravel	Men's triple jump	16.25	26	Did not advance	
Tajinderpal Singh Toor	Men's shot put	18.05	29	Did not advance	
Neeraj Chopra	Men's javelin throw	89.34 SB	1 Q	89.45 SB	2nd place, silver medalist(s)
Kishore Jena	Men's javelin throw	80.73	18	Did not advance	
Annu Rani	Women's javelin throw	55.81	29	Did not advance	

Legend

Ranks given for track events are within the athlete's heat only.

- Q – Qualified for the next round by placement or time standard in track events and by achieving the qualifying standard in field events
- q – Qualified for the next round, as a fastest loser in track events and by position without achieving the qualifying standard in field events
- NR – National record
- N/A – Round not applicable for the event

== Badminton ==
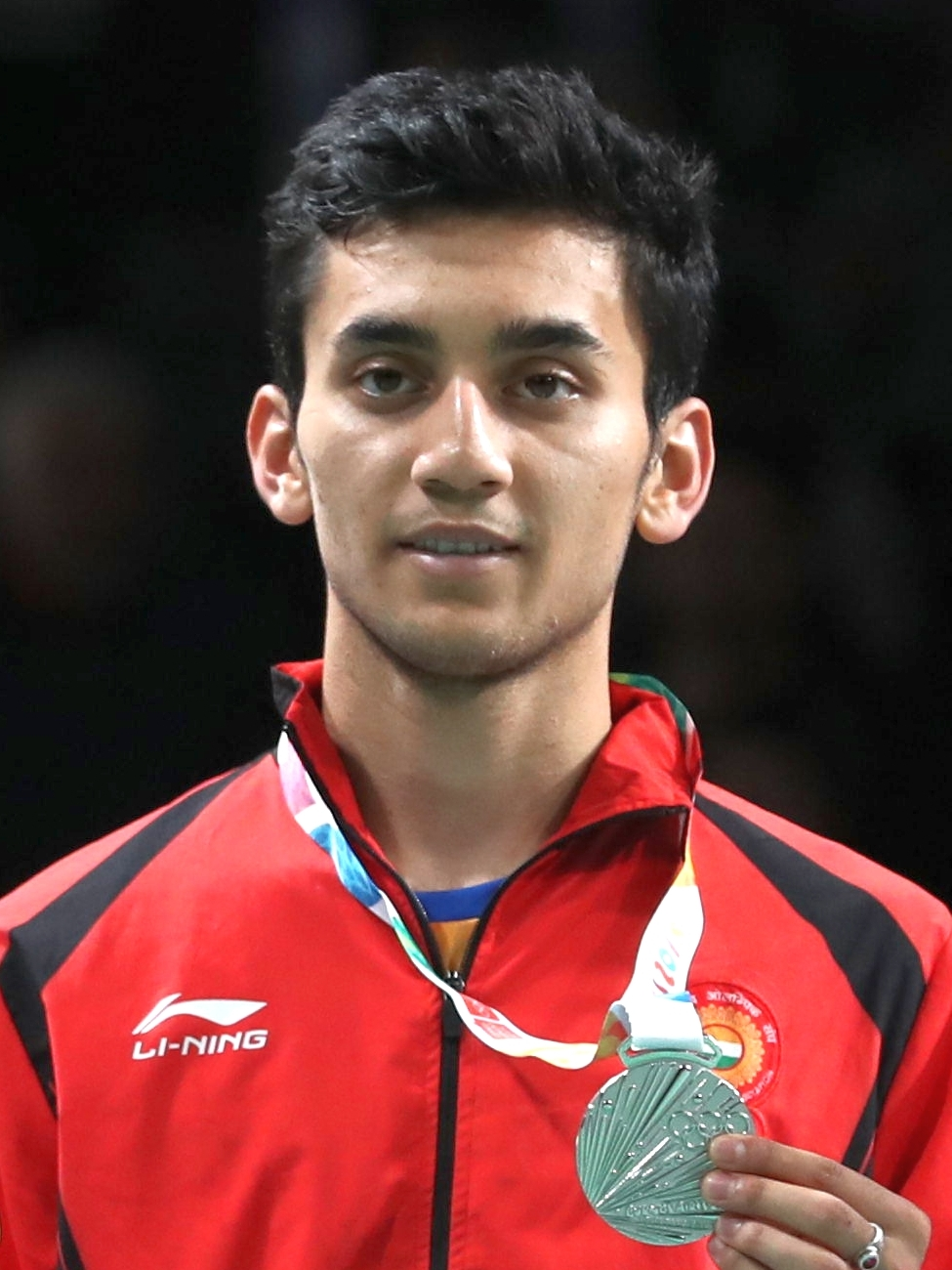
Competing in his first Olympics, Lakshya Sen became the first Indian to reach the semifinals of the men's singles event.

The Olympic qualification was based on the Badminton World Federation (BWF) rankings for the period between 1 May 2023 and 28 April 2024. Each NOC was permitted to enter a maximum of two players each in the men's and women's singles if both were ranked in the world's top 16 with one quota place to other NOCs until the roster of thirty-eight players has been completed. India qualified two shuttlers in the men's singles Prannoy H. S. and Lakshya Sen by virtue of their ninth and 13th rank in the Race to Paris ranking list. Woman shuttler P. V. Sindhu qualified for the women's individual event by finishing 12th in the list.

The qualification rules for the doubles event with the NOCs allowed to enter a maximum of two pairs if both are ranked in the top eight, while the remaining NOCs were entitled to one pair until the quota of 16 was filled. The Indian pair of Chirag Shetty and Satwiksairaj Rankireddy, who were ranked third and qualified for the men's doubles event. Ashwini Ponnappa and Tanisha Crasto also made it to the women's doubles event after finishing 13th in the rankings. India entered all the seven players who qualified for the tournament with three entries in the singles and two pairs in the doubles event. Amongst the Indian badminton contingent, Sindhu had won the silver medal in the women's singles event at the 2016 Games and bronze medal in the 2020 Games.

The badminton events were held at the Porte de la Chapelle Arena. In the men's singles event, both Prannoy and Sen won all their group stage matches to top their respective groups. While Sen won his matches in straight sets, Prannoy battled past Lê Đức Phát of Vietnam in his second match in three sets. Both of them faced off against each other in the round of 16 in which Sen emerged victorious in straight sets. In the quarterfinals, Sen overcame 12th seed Chou Tien-chen of Chinese Taipei to become the first Indian shuttler to reach semi-finals in the men's individual event. He lost a closely fought first set 19–21 before coming back to win the next two sets and take the match. In the semi-finals, he faced off against reigning Olympic champion Viktor Axelsen of Denmark. In the first set, Sen held a 20–17 lead but the Dane saved three set points to take the set. The Dane took the next set 21–14 to close out the match despite Sen taking a 7–0 lead early in the set. Sen faced Lee Zii Jia of Malaysia in the bronze medal match. In this match, Sen took the first set by a score of 21–13 but Lee came back to take the second set. Sen lost the decisive third set by a score of 11–21 to lose the match and miss out on the bronze medal.

In the men's doubles event, the Indian pair won both their group stage matches in straight sets to qualify for the quarterfinals. In the quarter finals, the fifth ranked Indian pair lost the first set to the third ranked Malaysia pair of Aaron Chia and Soh Wooi Yik. Though the Indians came back to win the second set, the Malaysians won the third set to ensure victory.

In the women's singles event, Sindhu won both her group stage matches easily to progress to the round of 16. In the round of 16 match, the Indian world no. 13 lost a closely contested first set to the higher ranked He Bingjiao of China by a score of 19–21. The Chinese shuttler took the second set easily to win the match and sent the Indian out of the competition.

The Indian women's doubles pair did not progress from the group stage after losing all the matches they played.

Athlete	Event	Group stage				Round of 16	Quarter-final	Semi-final	Final / BM	
Athlete	Event	Opposition Score	Opposition Score	Opposition Score	Rank	Opposition Score	Opposition Score	Opposition Score	Opposition Score	Rank
Prannoy H. S.	Men's singles	Roth (GER); W (21–18, 21–12)	Lê (VIE); W (16–21, 21–11, 21–12)	—N/a	1 Q	Sen (IND); L (12–21, 6–21)	Did not advance			
Lakshya Sen	Men's singles	Cordón (GUA); ~~W (21–8, 22–20)~~ (Note: Cordón withdrew from the tournament after this match due to a left elbow injury. As a result of this, this match was declared null and void.)	Carraggi (BEL); W (21–19, 21–14)	Christie (INA); W (21–18, 21–12)	1 Q	Prannoy (IND); W (21–12, 21–6)	Chou (TPE); W (19–21, 21–15, 21–12)	Axelsen (DEN); L (20–22, 14–21)	Lee Z J (MAS); L (21–13, 16–21, 11–21)	4
P. V. Sindhu	Women's singles	Razzaq (MDV); W (21–9, 21–6)	Kuuba (EST); W (21–5, 21–10)	—N/a	1 Q	Bingjiao (CHN); L (19–21, 14–21)	Did not advance			
Satwiksairaj Rankireddy; Chirag Shetty	Men's doubles	Corvée / Labar (FRA); W (21–17, 21–14)	~~Lamsfuß / Seidel (GER)~~ (Note: Lamsfuß and Seidel withdrew during the tournament.)	Alfian / Ardianto (INA); W (21–13, 21–13)	1 Q	—N/a	Chia / Yik (MAS); L (21–13, 14–21, 16–21)	Did not advance		
Tanisha Crasto; Ashwini Ponnappa	Women's doubles	Kim S-y / Kong H-y (KOR); L (18–21, 10–21)	Matsuyama / Shida (JPN); L (11–21, 12–21)	Mapasa / Yu (AUS); L (15–21, 10–21)	4	Did not advance				

Legend: W = Win; L = Loss; Q – Qualified for the next phase

== Boxing ==
The qualification to the Olympic Games were determined by the performances of the boxers at the four continental Olympic qualifying tournaments (Africa, Americas, Asia & Oceania, and Europe) and at the two World Olympic qualification tournaments organised by the Olympic Committee in early 2024.

India qualified six boxers for the tournament. Women boxers Nikhat Zareen, Preeti Pawar, and Lovlina Borgohain qualified for their respective weight divisions by virtue of their finish in the Asian Games 2022. While Parveen Hooda initially qualified for the women's 57 kg category, she was later suspended by the World Anti-Doping Agency due to a failed dope test and her place was taken by Jaismine Lamboria, who qualified by reaching the semi-finals of the 2024 World Boxing Olympic Qualification Tournament 2. Amit Panghal and Nishant Dev secured their quotas for the men's 57 kg and men's 71 kg events respectively, at the same qualification tournament. In the Indian boxing contingent, Panghal and Borgohain competed in their second Olympic Games while the other four made their debuts. Borgohain had won the bronze medal in the women's welterweight competition at the 2020 Games.

The boxing events took place from 27 July to 10 August with the preliminary matches conducted at Arena Paris Nord in Villepinte and the medal rounds scheduled at the Stade Roland Garros. In the men's events, Panghal faced off against higher seeded Patrick Chinyemba of Zambia, whom he had beaten en route to the 2022 Commonwealth Games title. But he lost to the Zambian by a 1–4 split decision. In the men's 71kg event, Dev progressed to the quarterfinals after he won a close first round bout in a 3–2 split decision. In the quarterfinals, Dev started strongly against Marco Verde of Mexico and took the first round 4–1. In the second round, the Mexican was marginally ahead 3–2 but a strong final round in which all the judges ruled in his favor meant that Dev lost by a 1–4 split decision to crash out of the event.

In the women's events, Lamboria lost her first round bout against 2020 Olympics silver medalist Nesthy Petecio of the Philippines by a unanimous decision in the women's featherweight category. In the women's bantamweight class, Pawar won her first round to progress to the round of 16. In the next round, she lost to Pan-American champion Yeni Arias of Colombia in a close contest by a 2–3 split decision. In the women's flyweight event, two time world champion Zareen began her campaign with an easy victory in the first round. But she lost her round of 16 bout to 2023 Asian Games gold medalist and top seed Wu Yu of China. In the women's middleweight category, Borgohain beat Norwegian Sunniva Hofstad to reach the quarterfinals, where she was drawn against reigning Asian Games champion and top seed Li Qian of China. In the quarterfinals, she matched the higher ranked Chinese closely in the first two rounds with both of them taking a round each by 3–2 split decisions. In the final round, Li came on top to take the verdict in 1 4–1 split decision. The result ended the Indian participation in the boxing event without a medal.

Athlete	Event	Round of 32	Round of 16	Quarterfinals	Semifinals	Final	
Athlete	Event	Opposition Result	Opposition Result	Opposition Result	Opposition Result	Opposition Result	Rank
Amit Panghal	Men's 51 kg	Bye	Chinyemba (ZAM); L 1–4	Did not advance			
Nishant Dev	Men's 71 kg	Bye	Rodríguez (ECU); W 3–2	Verde (MEX); L 1–4	Did not advance		
Nikhat Zareen	Women's 50 kg	Klötzer (GER); W 5–0	Wu Yu (CHN); L 0–5	Did not advance			
Preeti Pawar	Women's 54 kg	Võ (VIE); W 5–0	Arias (COL); L 2–3	Did not advance			
Jaismine Lamboria	Women's 57 kg	Petecio (PHI); L 0–5	Did not advance				
Lovlina Borgohain	Women's 75 kg	—N/a	Hofstad (NOR); W 5–0	Li (CHN); L 1–4	Did not advance		

Legend: W = Win; L = Loss

== Equestrian ==
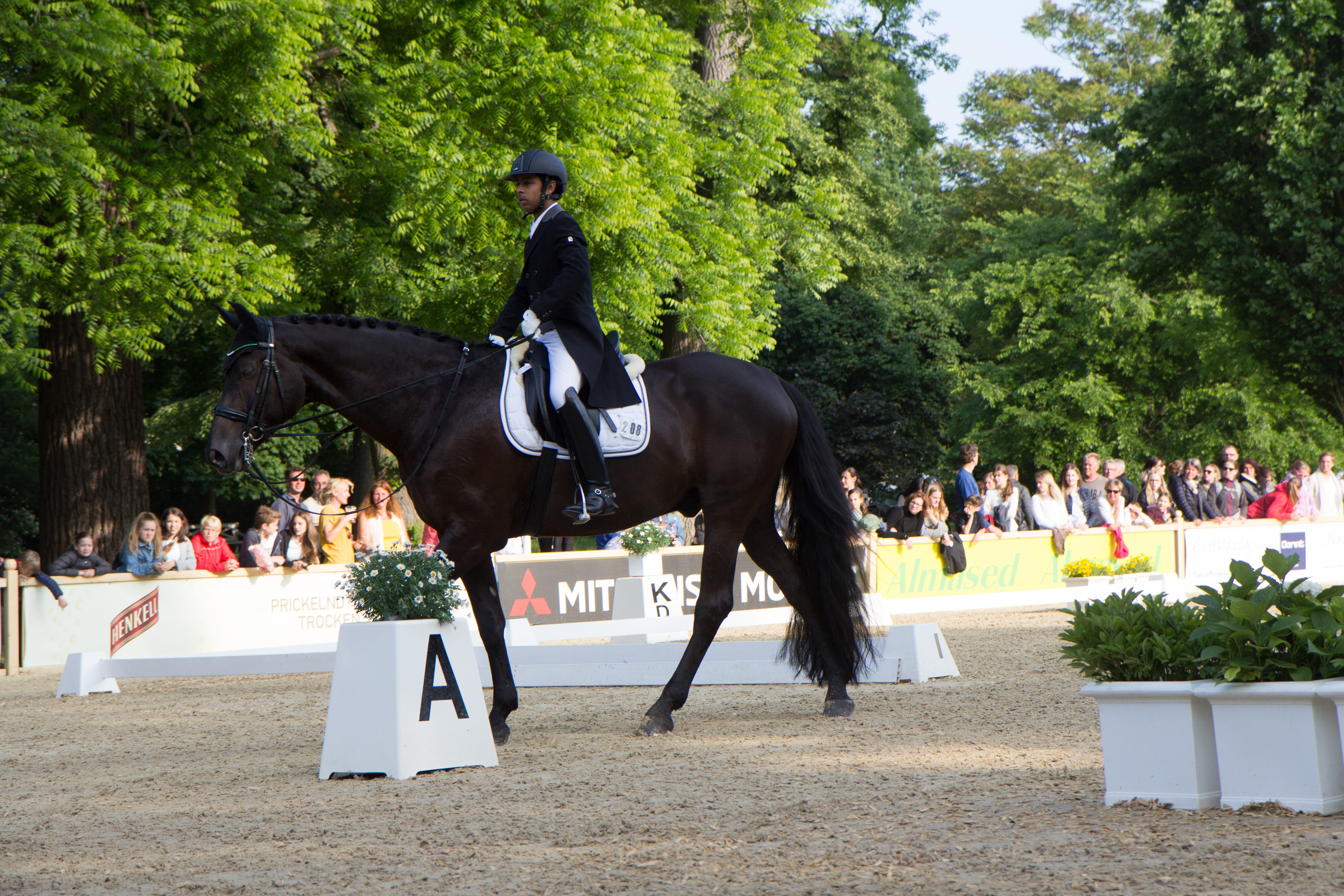
Anush Agarwalla was the first Indian to participate in the individual dressage event.

As per the qualification guidelines issued by the International Federation for Equestrian Sports (FEI), NOCs that did not qualify teams could earn up to two individual places in eventing based on the individual rankings. India secured one quota for the individual dressage allocated for the highest ranked individual NOC that had not qualified. Indian rider Anush Agarwalla was confirmed as the lone Indian entry for the Games in June 2024. Agarwalla was the first Indian to qualify for the individual dressage event and the second Indian to qualify for the individual Olympic equestrian competition since 2000 after Fouaad Mirza competed in eventing in 2020.

The first round of the main event took place on 30 July at the Palace of Versailles. Mirza finished a credible ninth among 63 competitors with a penalty score of 28 points. Agarwalla and his horse Sir Caramello Old were part of the Group E in the qualifiers. The duo finished ninth in the pool of ten riders with a score of 66.444 and did not make it to the next round.

Dressage

Athlete	Horse	Event	Grand Prix		Grand Prix Freestyle		Overall	
Athlete	Horse	Event	Score	Rank	Technical	Artistic	Score	Rank
Anush Agarwalla	Sir Caramello old	Individual	66.444	52	Did not advance			

== Field hockey ==
Team	Event	Group Stage						Quarter final	Semi final	Final / BM	
Team	Event	Opposition Score	Opposition Score	Opposition Score	Opposition Score	Opposition Score	Rank	Opposition Score	Opposition Score	Opposition Score	Rank
India men's	Men's tournament	New Zealand; W 3–2	Argentina; D 1–1	Ireland; W 2–0	Belgium; L 1–2	Australia; W 3–2	2 Q	Great Britain; W 1–1 (p.s.o.: 4–2)	Germany; L 2–3	Spain; W 2–1	3rd place, bronze medalist(s)

Legend

- W = Win; L = Loss; Q – Qualified for the next phase;
- FT – After full time
- P – Match decided by penalty-shootout

=== Men's tournament ===
As per the qualification system published by the International Hockey Federation (FIH), teams were allowed to qualify basis continental games (2023 Asian Games for Asia) and the 2024 Men's FIH Hockey Olympic Qualifiers. The India men's national field hockey team qualified for the games after winning the gold medal in the 2022 Asian Games in Hangzhou, China.

The main event was held from 27 July to 8 August 2024 at the Stade Yves-du-Manoir. India was placed in pool B in the group stage. In the group stage, India scored a narrow 3–2 victory over New Zealand in the first match before drawing the next game with Argentina by scoring the lone goal in the closing minutes of the game. The Indian team won the next match against Ireland, which ensured qualification to the quarterfinals. In the penultimate group stage game, the team lost to reigning Olympic champions Belgium by a scoreline of 1–2 despite scoring the opening goal in the 18th minute. In the final match of the group stages, India beat Australia 3–2 for their first victory over the Australians since the 1972 Games. India took a 2–0 lead and held on for victory, which ensured a second-place finish in the group stage.

In the quarterfinals, India faced off against Great Britain. India were down to ten men after defender Amit Rohidas received a red card in the 17th minute. Despite the disadvantage, Indian team took the lead after captain Harmanpreet Singh scored in the 22nd minute. Though Britain equalised in the 27th minute, the Indian team held on to a draw in regular time. In the ensuing penalty shoot-out, India scored all four while two of the opponent's shots were saved by Indian goalkeeper P. R. Sreejesh to ensure an Indian victory. India progressed to the semi-finals for the second Olympic Games in succession, where they faced Germany, whom they had defeated in the bronze medal match in the previous Games.

In the semifinals, India took the lead through a penalty corner from Harmanpreet in the seventh minute but Germany scored two goals in quick succession to take the lead in the 27th minute. Sukhjeet Singh later equalised for India in the 36th minute but Germany scored a later goal through Marco Miltkau to win the match and qualify for the finals. In the bronze medal match, Spain took the lead in the 18th minute. But India hit back with two goals in quick succession from Harmanpreet Singh to take the lead in the 33rd minute. From there on, India held on to record a 2–1 victory and won the bronze medal. Harmanpreet Singh finished as the top scorer with ten goals in eight matches.

Team roster

India announced their squad on 26 June 2024.

Head coach: (South Africa) Craig Fulton

No.	Pos.	Player	Date of birth (age)	Caps	Club
4	DF	Jarmanpreet Singh	18 July 1996 (aged 28)	106	(India) Income Tax
5	FW	Abhishek Nain	15 August 1999 (aged 24)	74	(India) Punjab National Bank
7	MF	Manpreet Singh	26 June 1992 (aged 32)	370	(India) Punjab Armed Police
8	MF	Hardik Singh	23 September 1998 (aged 25)	134	(India) Punjab Civil Secretariat
9	FW	Gurjant Singh	26 January 1995 (aged 29)	116	(India) Punjab Civil Secretariat
10	DF	Sanjay Rana	5 May 2001 (aged 23)	35	(India) Hockey Haryana
11	FW	Mandeep Singh	25 January 1995 (aged 29)	244	(India) Punjab Armed Police
13	DF	Harmanpreet Singh (Captain)	6 January 1996 (aged 28)	219	(India) Punjab Armed Police
14	FW	Lalit Upadhyay	1 December 1993 (aged 30)	168	(India) Uttar Pradesh Police
16	GK	P. R. Sreejesh	8 May 1988 (aged 36)	328	(India) Physical Education & Sports, Kerala
17	DF	Sumit Walmiki	20 December 1996 (aged 27)	134	(India) ONGC
21	MF	Shamsher Singh	29 July 1997 (aged 26)	95	(India) Punjab Armed Police
25	MF	Raj Kumar Pal	1 May 1998 (aged 26)	54	(India) CAGI
30	DF	Amit Rohidas	10 May 1993 (aged 31)	184	(India) Railway Sports Promotion Board
32	MF	Vivek Prasad	25 February 2000 (aged 24)	143	(India) Madhya Pradesh Police
34	FW	Sukhjeet Singh	5 December 1996 (aged 27)	70	(India) Punjab National Bank

Group play

Pos	Team	Pld	W	D	L	GF	GA	GD	Pts	Qualification
1	Belgium	5	4	1	0	15	7	+8	13	Advance to quarter-finals
2	India	5	3	1	1	10	7	+3	10	Advance to quarter-finals
3	Australia	5	3	0	2	12	10	+2	9	Advance to quarter-finals
4	Argentina	5	2	2	1	8	6	+2	8	Advance to quarter-finals
5	Ireland	5	1	0	4	4	9	−5	3	
6	New Zealand	5	0	0	5	4	14	−10	0	

Source: FIH
Rules for classification: 1) points; 2) matches won; 3) goal difference; 4) goals for; 5) head-to-head result; 6) field goals scored.

27 July 2024
17:30
v

India	3–2	New Zealand
Mandeep 24'; Vivek 34'; Harmanpreet 59'	Report	Lane 8'; Child 53'

Pitch 2
Umpires:
Marcin Grochal (POL)
Martin Madden (GBR)

29 July 2024
12:45
v

India	1–1	Argentina
Harmanpreet 59'	Report	Martínez 22'

Pitch 1
Umpires:
Daniel Barstow (GBR)
Zeke Newman (AUS)

30 July 2024
13:15
v

Ireland	0–2	India
	Report	Harmanpreet 11', 19'

Pitch 2
Umpires:
Steve Rogers (AUS)
David Tomlinson (NZL)

1 August 2024
10:00
v

India	1–2	Belgium
Abhishek 18'	Report	Stockbroekx 33'; Dohmen 44'

Pitch 1
Umpires:
Coen van Bunge (NED)
Zeke Newman (AUS)

2 August 2024
13:15
v

Australia	2–3	India
Craig 25'; Govers 55'	Report	Abhishek 12'; Harmanpreet 13', 32'

Pitch 2
Umpires:
Jonas van 't Hek (NED)
Gabriel Labate (ARG)

Quarterfinal

4 August 2024
10:00
v

India	1–1	Great Britain
Harmanpreet 22'	Report; Shootout report	Morton 27'
Penalties
Harmanpreet (penalty shoot-out scored); Sukhjeet (penalty shoot-out scored); Lalit (penalty shoot-out scored); Raj Kumar (penalty shoot-out scored)	4–2	(penalty shoot-out scored) Albery; (penalty shoot-out scored) Wallace; (penalty shoot-out missed) Williamson; (penalty shoot-out missed) Roper

Pitch 1
Umpires:
Sean Rapaport (RSA)
Steve Rogers (AUS)

Semifinal

6 August 2024
19:00
v

Germany	3–2	India
Peillat 18'; Rühr 27'; Miltkau 54'	Report	Harmanpreet 7'; Sukhjeet 36'

Pitch 1
Umpires:
Coen van Bunge (NED)
Gareth Greenfield (NZL)

Bronze medal game

8 August 2024
14:00
v

(bronze) India	2–1	Spain
Harmanpreet 30', 33'	Report	Miralles 18'

Pitch 1
Umpires:
Coen van Bunge (NED)
Ben Göntgen (GER)

== Golf ==
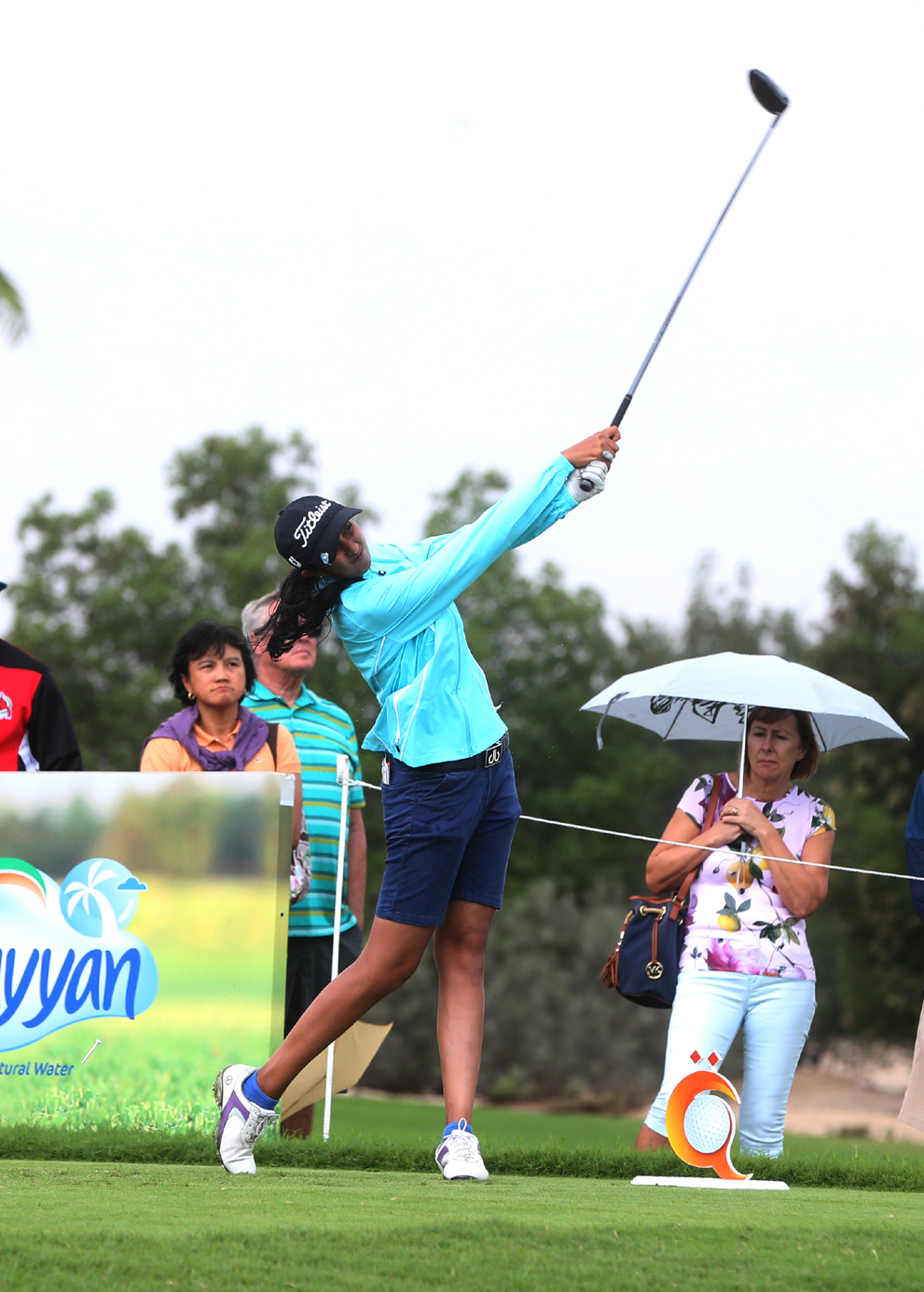
Aditi Ashok, competed in her third Games after she narrowly missed out on a medal to finish fourth in the 2020 event.

The qualification to golfing events was based on the International Golf Federation (IGF) Official World Golf Ranking for men and Women's World Golf Rankings for women as of 17 June 2024 and 24 June 2024 respectively, with a total of 60 players qualifying in each of the men's and women's events. The top 15 players qualified directly with a limit of four golfers per NOC and the remaining spots went to the highest-ranked players from countries that did not already have two golfers qualified, with a limit of two per country.

India qualified four golfers (two men and two women) for the tournament based on the above criteria. Shubhankar Sharma and Gaganjeet Bhullar ranked 219 and 261 in the world qualified in the 46th and 51st positions respectively. Aditi Ashok and Diksha Dagar ranked 60 and 167 in the rankings qualified at the 25th and 41st positions respectively. This would be Ashok's third Olympics after 2016 and 2020, where she missed out on a medal by a single shot. This was Dagar's second Games entry while both the male golfers made their debuts in the Games.

The men's event was held between 1 and 4 August at Le Golf National in Guyancourt. After the first round, Sharma was placed tied 29th after a score of two under par 70. He scored better in the second round to move up to tied 25th before two par rounds meant that he finished tied 40th in the overall rankings. Bhuller had a bad first round with three over par 75 to be placed tied 52nd. Though he scored better in the next three rounds, he ended with one over par to be placed tied 45th in the final classification.

The women's event was held between 7 and 10 August at Le Golf National. After the first two rounds, Ashok and Dagar were both placed tied 14th after a similar score of one under par. Both the golfers had a poor third round with Ashok scoring a seven over par 79 to drop to tied 40th and Dagar scoring an eight over par 80 to be ranked tied 42nd. Though Aditi recovered with a score of four under par 68 in the fourth round, she finished tied 29th overall with a cumulative score of two over par. Dagar's fourth round did not go well, after she shot a six over par 78 and finished tied 49th on overall standings.

Athlete	Event	Round 1	Round 2	Round 3	Round 4	Total		
Athlete	Event	Score	Score	Score	Score	Score	Par	Rank
Shubhankar Sharma	Men's	70	69	72	72	283	−1	T40
Gaganjeet Bhullar	Men's	75	69	71	70	285	+1	T45
Aditi Ashok	Women's	72	71	79	68	290	+2	T29
Diksha Dagar	Women's	71	72	80	78	301	+13	T49

Legend: T = Tied

== Judo ==
Each NOC could enter a maximum of 14 judokas for the event with one in each weight division. The qualification was determined by the world ranking list prepared by International Judo Federation (IJF) as on 23 June 2024. The top 17 were awarded straight quotas apart from continental quotas that were awarded by IJF. As per the final qualification list, one Indian judoka Tulika Maan was awarded an entry in the women's 78 kg category. She qualified under the continental quota as one of the top two ranked Asians outside the top 17 of the rankings and was the lone Indian judoka at the Games.

The final event was held on 2 August at Grand Palais Éphémère in Champ de Mars. Maan faced off against veteran four time Olympic medalist Idalys Ortiz of Cuba in the first round. Ortiz scored an easy victory after she scored an ippon in just 28 seconds and knocked the Indian out of the competition.

Athlete	Event	Round of 64	Round of 32	Round of 16	Quarterfinals	Semifinals	Final
Athlete	Event	Opposition Result	Opposition Result	Opposition Result	Opposition Result	Opposition Result	Rank
Tulika Maan	Women's +78 kg	—N/a	Ortiz (CUB); L 0–10	Did not advance			

== Rowing ==
As per the World Rowing Federation (FISA), the initial qualifying spots were awarded to the NOCs based on results at the 2023 World Rowing Championships held in Belgrade, Serbia from 3 August to 10 September 2023 followed by the four continental qualifying regattas. NOCs were allowed a maximum of one boat per event. India qualified one boat in the men's single sculls for the Games by securing one of the three berths available at the 2024 FISA Asia & Oceania Olympic Qualification Regatta held at Chungju, South Korea in April 2023. Indian rower Balraj Panwar represented India at the event.

The main event took place from 27 July to 3 August 2024 at the National Olympic Nautical Stadium of Île-de-France in Vaires-sur-Marne. In the heats, Panwar finished fourth and qualified for the quarterfinals via repechage rounds. He failed to make it to the medal events and finished 23rd amongst the 30 competitors in the event.

Athlete	Event	Heats		Repechage		Quarterfinals		Semifinals		Final	
Athlete	Event	Time	Rank	Time	Rank	Time	Rank	Time	Rank	Time	Rank
Balraj Panwar	Men's single sculls	7:07.11	4 R	7:12.41	2 QF	7:05.10	5 SC/D	7:04.97	6 FD	7:02.37	23

Legend: R = Repechage; QF = Quarterfinals; SC/D = Semifinals C/D; FD = Final D (non-medal)

== Sailing ==
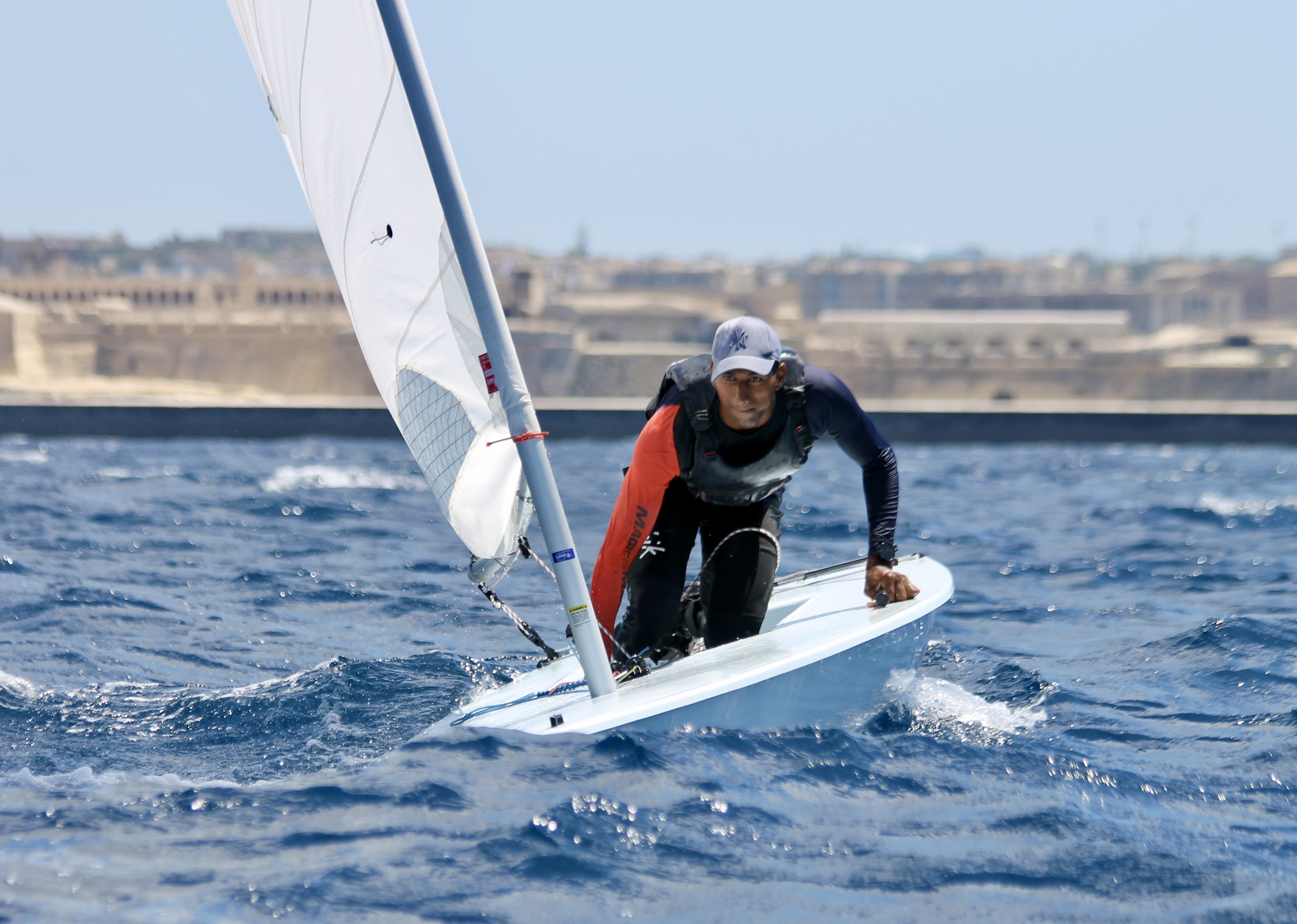
Vishnu Saravanan qualified for the men's laser event for the second consecutive Olympics and registered an 18th-place finish, the best ever for an Indian sailor.

The qualification period for the sailing event commenced at the 2023 Sailing World Championships in The Hague, Netherlands where about forty percent of the total quota was awarded to the top NOCs. Further quota places for Asia were allocated at the 2023 Asian Games, the Asian Olympic qualifier event in Thailand and the Last Chance Regatta in 2024. Seven places were distributed to sailors representing the highest-finishing, not previously qualified NOCs at the 2024 ILCA World Championships.

Indian sailor Vishnu Saravanan qualified one boat for the men's laser event at the World Championships held in Adelaide, Australia. For the Women's laser radial event, Nethra Kumanan was granted an entry as a part of the emerging nations programme at the Last Chance Regetta held in Hyères, France. Both of them competed in their second consecutive Olympic Games after being part of the 2020 Games.

The sailing events were held off the coast of Marseille from 28 July to 8 August. In the men's laser event, Saravanan started well in the first race to finish in the top ten but hovered around the 20th place mark in the next few races. Though he recovered to put in stronger performances in the next two races with a best finish in the seventh race, he ended up in 18th place amongst 43 competitors in the overall classification with 114 points. In the women's event, Kumanan had a strong first two races with the best of sixth place in the first race. But a poor series of three races dropped her down the order from which she never recovered. Though she put in another top ten finish in the final race, she ended up in 21st rank amongst the 43 sailors in the overall classification. Though both of them failed to progress to the medal races, this was the best Olympic performance by both the sailors in their respective categories.

Medal race events

Athlete	Event	Race											Net points	Final rank
Athlete	Event	1	2	3	4	5	6	7	8	9	10	Medal	Net points	Final rank
Vishnu Saravanan	Men's ILCA 7	10	~~34~~*	20	19	21	13	7	24	CL		EL	114	18
Nethra Kumanan	Women's ILCA 6	6	15	27	28	28	20	21	~~31~~*	10	CL	EL	155	21

Legend: Low-point scoring system; CL = Cancelled; EL = Eliminated – Did not advance to the medal race; * = Worst race result not counted in the overall score

== Shooting ==
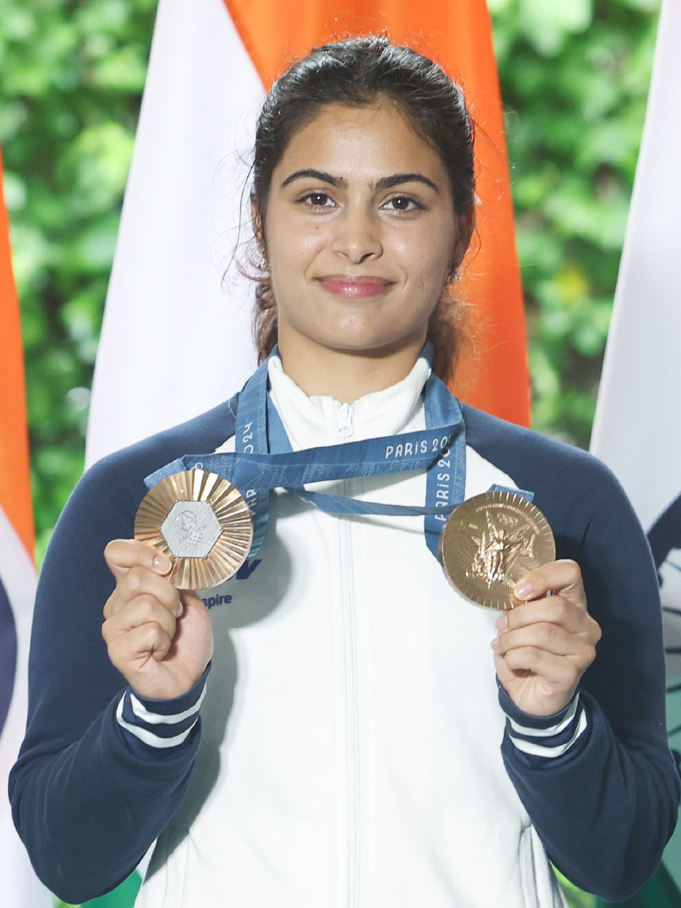
Manu Bhaker won two bronze medals and became the first Indian to win two medals in a single Games since Independence.

As per the International Shooting Sport Federation (ISSF) guidelines, quota places for the Games were allocated to the NOCs based on the results at designated ISSF supervised events held from 14 August 2022 to 9 June 2024. Initial quota places were allocated only to the NOCs, who were allowed to choose the individual shooters. After the initial quotas were allocated, shooters were granted entries based on the ISSF world rankings, which were awarded directly to the individual shooters and were not to be changed by the NOCs.

Indian shooters achieved the maximum of 16 quota places (eight each in rifle and pistol events) for the shooting events based on the results at the 2022 and 2023 ISSF World Championships, 2023 and 2024 Asian Championships, and 2024 ISSF World Olympic Qualification tournaments. The Indian shooting squad was named based on the shooters' average scores from three of the four selection trials approved by the National Rifle Association of India. India sent 21-member contingent, the highest ever to the shooting event and competed across all 15 medal events. Manu Bhaker, Anjum Moudgil, Aishwary Tomar and Elavenil Valarivan participated in their second Olympic Games while the others made their debuts.

The shooting events took place from 27 July to 5 August 2024 at the National Shooting Centre in Châteauroux.

Men

In the men's 50 m rifle three positions event, Swapnil Kusale made it to the finals after finishing seventh with a score of 590 in the qualifiers. In the finals, Kusale started slowly to be ranked sixth amongst the eight finalists after the first set of shots in kneeling position. He recovered with a good set of shots in the prone and standing positions to rise up the leader-board. He finished with 451.4 to win the bronze medal, India's third of the Games till then, all coming from shooting. Arjun Babuta qualified for the finals of the men's 10 m air rifle event. He started strongly in the finals and was ranked third for most of the event. But two poor shots meant that he finished fourth and missed out on a medal. In the men's 25 m rapid fire pistol event, Vijayveer Sidhu was placed fifth after the first stage but a poor score in the next round meant that he finished ninth and missed out on qualification for the finals.

Athlete	Event	Qualification		Final	
Athlete	Event	Points	Rank	Points	Rank
Arjun Babuta	10 m air rifle	630.1	7 Q	208.4	4
Sandeep Singh	10 m air rifle	629.3	12	Did not advance	
Arjun Singh Cheema	10 m air pistol	574	18	Did not advance	
Sarabjot Singh	10 m air pistol	577	9	Did not advance	
Aishwary Pratap Singh Tomar	50 m rifle 3 positions	589	11	Did not advance	
Swapnil Kusale	50 m rifle 3 positions	590	7 Q	451.4	3rd place, bronze medalist(s)
Anish Bhanwala	25 m rapid fire pistol	582	13	Did not advance	
Vijayveer Sidhu	25 m rapid fire pistol	583	9	Did not advance	
Prithviraj Tondaiman	Trap	118	21	Did not advance	
Anantjeet Singh Naruka	Skeet	116	24	Did not advance	

Women

Amongst the women's events, Bhaker qualified for the final of the women's 10 m air pistol event after she placed third in the qualifiers. In the final held on 28 July, she started well to be placed second after the first series of shots but dropped down the order after a poor second series. She finished with a score of 221.7 to secure a bronze medal, India's first at the current Olympics. It was also the fifth shooting medal and the first from an India woman shooter.

Ramita Jindal qualified for the women's 10 m air rifle events respectively. She started well to be ranked fourth after the first series of shots. But she dropped down the order after some poor shots in the second set to finish seventh in the final rankings. In the women's 25 m pistol event, Bhaker again made it to the finals after being placed second in the qualification rounds. In the final, she started poorly in the first few round to be tied sixth before she progressed up the order to be ranked joint second, one point behind the leader after the seventh series. But a poor score in the next series where she missed three shots out of five meant that she was level on points with Veronica Major of Hungary. In the shoot-off for third place, Bhaker started strongly before two missed shots to finish fourth and miss out on a third medal.

Athlete	Event	Qualification		Final	
Athlete	Event	Points	Rank	Points	Rank
Elavenil Valarivan	10 m air rifle	630.7	10	Did not advance	
Ramita Jindal	10 m air rifle	631.5	5 Q	145.3	7
Rhythm Sangwan	10 m air pistol	573	15	Did not advance	
Manu Bhaker	10 m air pistol	580	3 Q	221.7	3rd place, bronze medalist(s)
Manu Bhaker	25 m pistol	590	2 Q	28	4
Esha Singh	25 m pistol	581	18	Did not advance	
Anjum Moudgil	50 m rifle 3 positions	584	18	Did not advance	
Sift Kaur Samra	50 m rifle 3 positions	575	31	Did not advance	
Rajeshwari Kumari	Trap	113	22	Did not advance	
Shreyasi Singh	Trap	113	23	Did not advance	
Maheshwari Chauhan	Skeet	118	14	Did not advance	
Raiza Dhillon	Skeet	113	23	Did not advance	

Mixed

In the mixed 10 m air pistol event, she teamed up with Sarabjot Singh to finish third in the qualification and secured entry to the bronze medal match. In the bronze medal match held on 30 July, the Indian duo defeated Oh Ye-jin and Lee Won-ho of South Korea to win the bronze. Bhaker became the first Indian multiple medalist from a single Olympics after Indian independence. In the mixed skeet team event, Indian duo of Maheshwari Chauhan and Anantjeet Singh Naruka finished fourth in the qualifiers to advance to the bronze medal match. In the bronze medal match, both the teams were tied on 20 hits after the first three series of hits. In the last three series, the Chinese duo hit all the targets to win the match 44–43. India missed the bronze medal by a single point and the match ended India's shooting campaign for the Games.

Athlete	Event	Qualification		Final / BM	
Athlete	Event	Points	Rank	Opponent Score	Rank
Manu Bhaker; Sarabjot Singh	10 metre air pistol team	580	3 QB	Oh Y-j / Lee W-h (KOR); W (16–10)	3rd place, bronze medalist(s)
Rhythm Sangwan; Arjun Singh Cheema	10 metre air pistol team	576	10	Did not advance	
Elavenil Valarivan; Sandeep Singh	10 metre air rifle team	626.3	12	Did not advance	
Ramita Jindal; Arjun Babuta	10 metre air rifle team	628.7	6	Did not advance	
Maheshwari Chauhan; Anantjeet Singh Naruka	Skeet team	146	4 QB	Jiang / Lyu (CHN); L (43–44)	4

Legend: Q = Qualified for the final; QB = Qualified for the bronze medal match; W = Win; L = Loss

== Swimming ==
As per the World Aquatics guidelines, a NOC was permitted to enter a maximum of two qualified athletes in each individual event, who have achieved the Olympic Qualifying Time. One athlete per event will be allowed to enter if they meet the Olympic Selection Time if the quota is not filled. NOCs were allowed to enter swimmers (one per gender) under a universality place even if no one achieved the standard entry times. India was awarded two universality quota places in swimming. Srihari Nataraj and Dhinidhi Desinghu qualified for the men's 100 m backstroke and women's 200 m freestyle events respectively. Dhinidhi, aged 14, was the youngest Indian competitor in the games.

The swimming events were held at the Paris La Défense Arena. In the men's 100m backstroke event, Nataraj finished 33rd out of the 46 competitors with a time of 55.01 and failed to qualify for the next round. In the women's freestyle event, Desinghu endured a similar fate after she finished in 23rd place amongst the 31 competitors.

Athlete	Event	Heat		Semifinal		Final	
Athlete	Event	Time	Rank	Time	Rank	Time	Rank
Srihari Nataraj	Men's 100 metre backstroke	55.01	33	Did not advance			
Dhinidhi Desinghu	Women's 200 metre freestyle	2:06.96	23	Did not advance			

== Table tennis ==
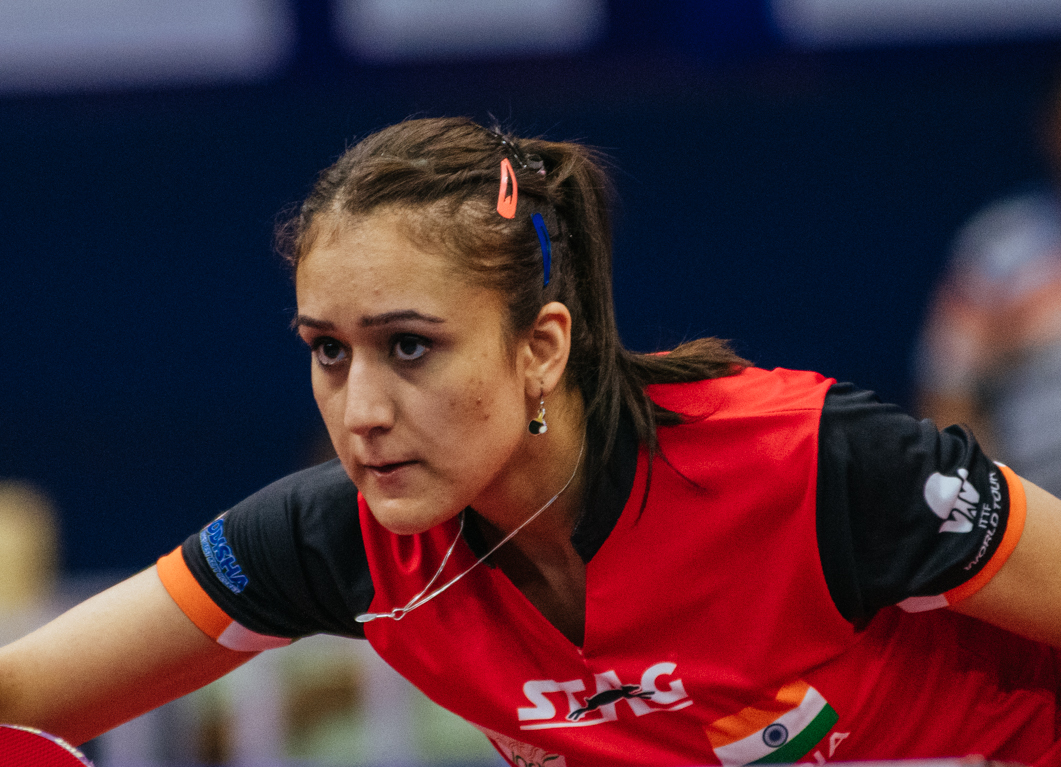
Manika Batra won her first two games before losing in the quarterfinals in the women's singles.

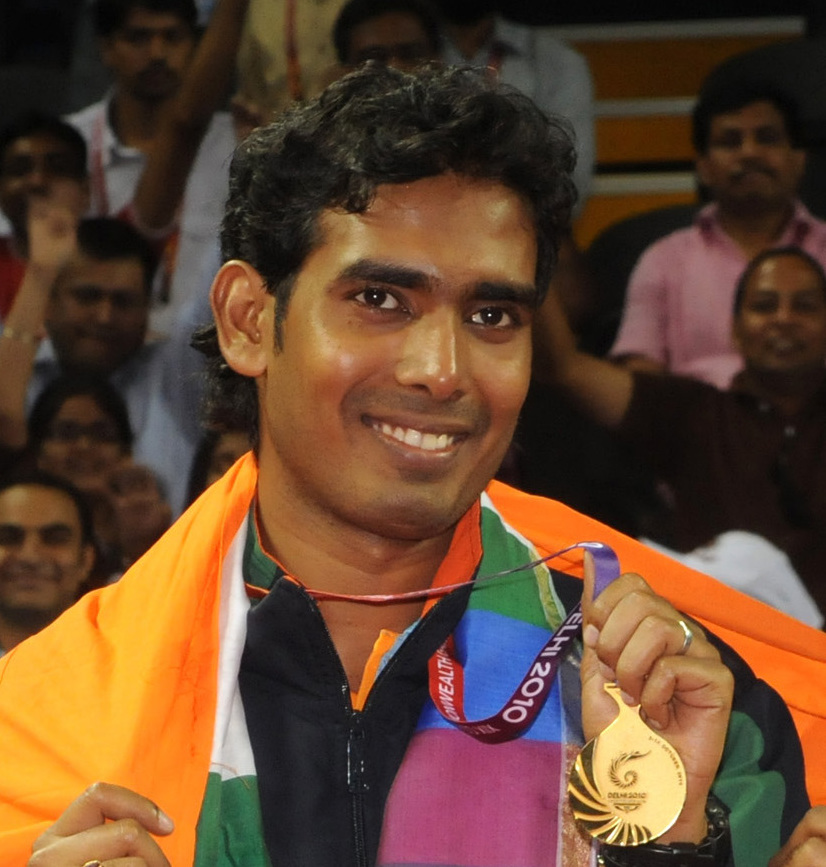
Sharath Kamal participated in his fifth Olympic Games, but did not make it past the first round.

According to the International Table Tennis Federation (ITTF), each NOC was allowed to enter up to six athletes, two male and two female athletes in singles events, up to one men's and one women's team in team events, and up to one pair in mixed doubles. Qualification was awarded through a combination of ITTF rankings, continental quotas and world qualification tournaments. NOCs which have qualified for the team events were eligible to field two players each for the singles events. Indian men's and women's team qualified for the games by virtue of their ITTF rankings and as a result, two players automatically qualified for the men's and women's singles events. The Indian squad for the event was announced on 26 May 2024 and consisted of six players across four events. Sharath Kamal made his fifth appearance at the Olympics while Manika Batra competed in her third successive Games.

The main events were held from 27 July to 10 August at the Paris Expo Porte de Versailles. In the men's singles event, world no. 40 Kamal lost a hard-fought match against the lower ranked Deni Kozul of Slovenia. He won the first set before losing three successive sets and ended with a scoreline of 2–4 to be ousted from the competition. Harmeet Desai won the preliminary round in straight sets before losing to Frenchman Felix Lebrun by a similar score in the round of 64.

In the women's singles event, world no. 28 Batra beat world No. 103 Anna Hursey of Great Britain in the first round and overcame Prithika Pavade of France in the next round. But her campaign ended in the round of 16, when she lost to the higher ranked Olympic medalist Miu Hirano of Japan. The other competitor in the women's singles event Sreeja Akula, ranked 25th in the world, beat world No. 58 Christina Kallberg of Sweden in straight sets in the round of 64. She won against Zeng Jian of Singapore in a comeback victory after losing the first set. In the pre-quarterfinals, she was beaten by the top ranked Chinese Sun Yingsha in straight sets, which ended India's campaign in the singles events at the Games.

In the first round of the men's team event, the Indian team lost three straight matches to the top seeded Chinese team and exited the competition. In the first round of the women's team event, the 11th seeded Indian team faced off against the fifth seeded Romania. Akula and Archana Kamath teamed up to win the first match and Batra won the second match against the higher ranked Bernadette Szocs. But Romania won the next two singles matches to tie the series before Batra won the fifth match to progress to the next round. In the quarterfinals, India lost the doubles match to Germany to concede a lead. In the second match, Batra was defeated by lower ranked Annett Kaufmann before Archana Kamath secured a victory against the higher ranked Shan Xiaona. But Kaufmann once again stunned the higher ranked Akula to win the match and knock the Indian team out of the competition.

Athlete	Event	Preliminary	Round of 64	Round of 32	Round of 16	Quarterfinals	Semifinals	Final / BM	
Athlete	Event	Opposition Result	Opposition Result	Opposition Result	Opposition Result	Opposition Result	Opposition Result	Opposition Result	Rank
Sharath Kamal	Men's singles	Bye	Kozul (SLO); L 2–4	Did not advance					
Harmeet Desai	Men's singles	Yaman (JOR); W 4–0	Lebrun (FRA); L 0–4	Did not advance					
Sharath Kamal; Harmeet Desai; Manav Thakkar	Men's team	—N/a			China; L 0–3	Did not advance			
Manika Batra	Women's singles	Bye	Hursey (GBR); W 4–1	Pavade (FRA); W 4–0	Hirano (JPN); L 1–4	Did not advance			
Sreeja Akula	Women's singles	Bye	Källberg (SWE); W 4–0	Zeng (SGP); W 4–2	Sun Y (CHN); L 0–4	Did not advance			
Manika Batra; Sreeja Akula; Archana Kamath	Women's team	—N/a			Romania; W 3–2	Germany; L 1–3	Did not advance		

Legend: W = Win; L = Loss

== Tennis ==
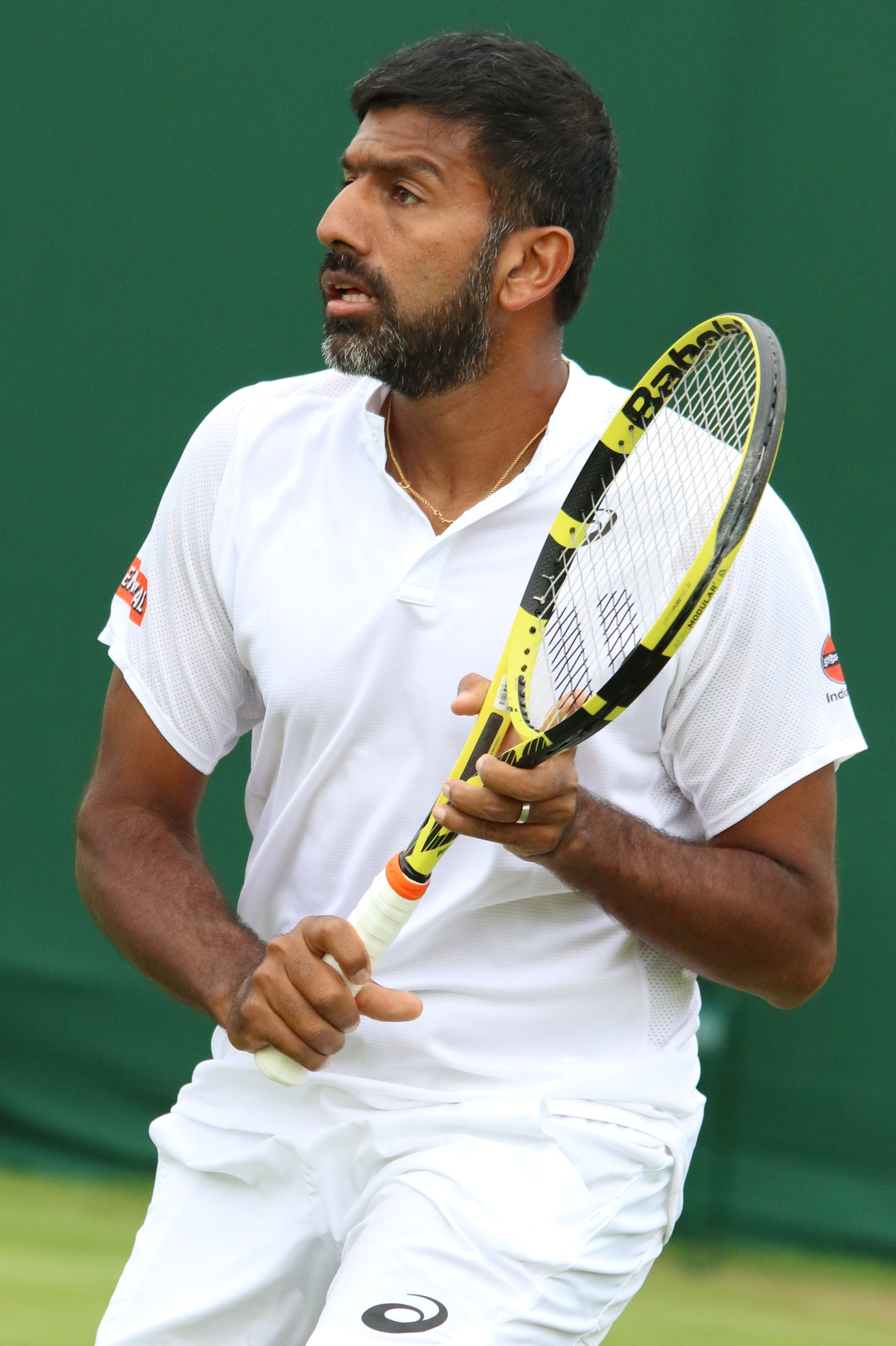
Rohan Bopanna, who competed in his third Olympics and was the oldest athlete of the Indian contingent.

As per the International Tennis Federation, the main qualifying criterion was based on the players' positions on the ATP Entry Ranking and WTA ranking lists published on 10 June 2024. Additionally, players had to have been part of the nominated team for three Davis Cup (men) events after the last Olympics. The top 56 ranked players in the singles event qualified directly with spots allocated to subsequent ranked players if the NOCs exhaust the quota of four. Sumit Nagal qualified for the men's singles on the qualification criteria based on his ATP ranking of 77.

For the doubles event, top ten ranked players qualified directly and were allowed to choose their partners ranked under 400. Rohan Bopanna's fourth ranking in the ATP rankings secured an entry in the men's doubles event, where he chose to partner Sriram Balaji. Bopanna competed in his third Olympics and was the oldest athlete of the Indian contingent at 44 while Nagal competed in his second Olympic Games.

The tennis events were held from 27 July to 4 August at the Stade Roland Garros. In the men's singles, Nagal faced off against the higher ranked French opponent Corentin Moutet, whom he had beaten in their only previous meeting. Nagal lost the first set before he broke back twice to secure the second set 6–2. But he lost the closely contested third set and the match to be eliminated from the competition. In the men's doubles, the unseeded Indian pair faced off against the French pair of Gael Monfils and Édouard Roger-Vasselin in the round of 32. The French pair won in straight sets match that lasted just 76 minutes, which ended the Indian competition in the event.

Athlete	Event	Round of 64	Round of 32	Round of 16	Quarterfinals	Semifinals	Final / BM	
Athlete	Event	Opposition Result	Opposition Result	Opposition Result	Opposition Result	Opposition Result	Opposition Result	Rank
Sumit Nagal	Men's Singles	Moutet (FRA); L 2–6, 6–2, 5–7	Did not advance					
Rohan Bopanna; Sriram Balaji	Men's Doubles	—N/a	Monfils / Roger-Vasselin (FRA); L 5–7, 2–6	Did not advance				

Legend: W = Win; L = Loss

== Weightlifting ==
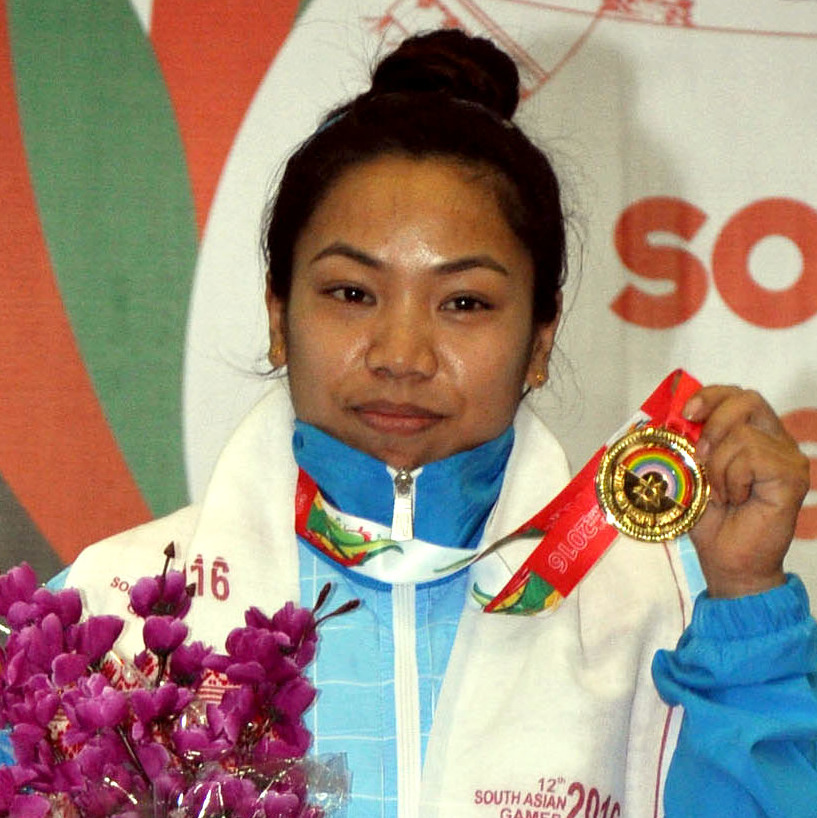
Saikhom Mirabai Chanu, who won a silver medal in the 2020 Olympics, was the lone Indian participant.

As per the guidelines set by the International Weightlifting Federation (IWF), each NOC was allowed to enter one competitor per event with a maximum of three per gender. The top eight athletes by ranking points obtained from 1 August 2022 to 28 April 2024 in each weight category qualified directly subject to the above condition.

Tokyo 2020 silver medalist Saikhom Mirabai Chanu secured one of the top ten slots in the women's 49 kg weight division based on the IWF Olympic qualification rankings.

The main event took place on 7 August at the Paris Expo Porte de Versailles. Mirabai Chanu lifted 85 kg on her first snatch attempt. However, she registered an unsuccessful second attempt to lift 88 kg, which was one kg more than her lift at the previous Olympics and matched her personal best. In the third and final attempt, she cleared the same weight and was ranked joint-third along with Surodchana Khambao of Thailand. In the clean & jerk, she had the highest first attempt weight, set at 111 kg. She faltered in the first attempt but cleared the same in the second attempt. Khambao lifted 112 kg, which forced Mirabai Chanu to try 114 kg for a medal place. But she couldn't clear the weight and finished with 111 kg lift, which was way below her personal mark of 119 kg. As a result, she finished fourth overall, and missed out on a bronze medal by a single kg.

Athlete	Event	Snatch					Clean & Jerk					Total	Rank
Athlete	Event	Attempt 1	Attempt 2	Attempt 3	Result	Rank	Attempt 1	Attempt 2	Attempt 3	Result	Rank	Total	Rank
Saikhom Mirabai Chanu	Women's −49 kg	85	~~88~~	88	88	3	~~111~~	111	~~114~~	111	4	199	4

== Wrestling ==
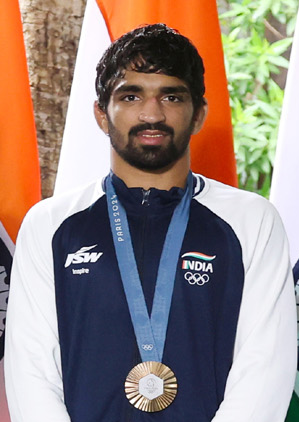
Aman Sehrawat, aged 21, became the youngest Indian athlete to win an Olympic medal.

As per the United World Wrestling, each NOC was allowed to enter a maximum of 18 wrestlers with one per event. Quotas were allocated at the 2023 World Wrestling Championships, continental tournaments (including 2024 Asian Wrestling Olympic Qualification Tournament for Asia) and 2024 World Wrestling Olympic Qualification Tournament. Antim Panghal qualified in the women's 53 kg category with a top five result at the 2023 World Championships held in Belgrade, Serbia in September 2023. Vinesh Phogat, Anshu Malik, and Reetika Hooda secured quotas in the women's 50kg, 57 kg, and 76 kg categories respectively at the 2024 Asian Qualification Tournament held in April 2024 at Bishkek in Kyrgyzstan. Nisha Dahiya and Aman Sehrawat qualified for the women's 68 kg and men's 57 kg event respectively through the 2024 World Qualification Tournament held in Istanbul in May 2024. India entered the six qualified wrestlers in the freestyle category for the Games.

The wrestling events took place between 5 August and 11 August at the Grand Palais Éphémère in Champ de Mars. In the women's 68 kg event, Dahiya defeated fifth seed Tetiana Rizhko of Ukraine in the first round. Though the Ukrainian took an early lead, Dahiya mounted a comeback to take the contest. In the quarterfinals, she took a commanding 8–1 lead against Pak Sol-gum of North Korea. But a dislocated shoulder and a finger injury meant that she struggled with pain heading into the final minute of the bout and lost 8–10 after the North Korean took advantage of the situation to score nine straight points in quick succession.

In the first round of the women's 50 kg event, Vinesh Phogat defeated reigning Olympic and world champion Yui Susaki of Japan, who had not conceded a single point to an opponent in the Tokyo Olympics. The match was a cagey affair with Susaki leading 2–0 through two penalty points until the final few seconds when the Indian effected a takedown and scored an upset win. Phogat beat Oksana Livach of Ukraine in the quarterfinals and Yusneylys Guzmán of Cuba in the semifinals by point decisions to qualify for the final. However, Phogat was later disqualified for being 100g above the stipulated weight during the weigh-in on the morning of the finals. As a result, she was relegated to last place in the classification.

In the women's 53 kg event, Olympic debutant Panghal lost to Turkey's Zeynep Yetgil in the round of 16 bout, which ended in less than two minutes. Likewise, in the women's 57 kg event, Malik was beaten by Helen Maroulis of the United States in the round of 16. In the men's 57 kg event, Aman Sehrawat beat Vladimir Egorov of North Macedonia in his first round. He scored ten consecutive points to beat his opponent comfortably by technical superiority. In the quarterfinals, he again scored a similar victory against Zelimkhan Abakarov of Albania within four minutes to make it to the semifinals. In the semifinals, he lost to Japan's Rei Higuchi within four minutes after failing to score a single point. In the bronze medal bout, he faced Darian Cruz of Puerto Rico. Though both the wrestlers scored points initially, Sehrawat led 6–3 at half-time. He dominated the second half to win the bout by a scoreline of 13-5 and took the bronze medal.

In the women's 76 kg event, Hooda defeated eighth seed Bernadett Nagy of Hungary in the round of 16 by technical superiority. In the quarterfinals, she faced top seed Aiperi Medet Kyzy of Kyrgyzstan. It was a close match where neither wrestler gained a decisive advantage and the score finished tied at one point apiece. But as the Kyrgyz wrestler scored the last point, she won as per the count-back mechanism and as a result, Hooda failed to advance to the semifinals.

Freestyle

Athlete	Event	Round of 16	Quarterfinal	Semifinal	Repechage	Final / BM	
Athlete	Event	Opposition Result	Opposition Result	Opposition Result	Opposition Result	Opposition Result	Rank
Aman Sehrawat	Men's −57 kg	Egorov (MKD); W 10–0 ^{VSU}	Abakarov (ALB); W 12–0 ^{VSU}	Higuchi (JPN); L 0–10 ^{VSU}	—N/a	Cruz (PUR); W 13–5 ^{VPO1}	3rd place, bronze medalist(s)
Vinesh Phogat	Women's −50 kg	Susaki (JPN); W 3–2 ^{VPO1}	Livach (UKR); W 7–5 ^{VPO1}	Guzmán (CUB); ~~W 5–0 ^{VPO}~~	—N/a	DSQ (Note: Phogat initially qualified for the finals, but was later disqualified for being above the stipulated weight during the weigh-in on the morning of the finals. As a result, she was eliminated from the medal competition and was not classified.)	LFO
Antim Panghal	Women's −53 kg	Yetgil (TUR); L 0–10 ^{VSU}	Did not advance				15
Anshu Malik	Women's −57 kg	Maroulis (USA); L 2–7 ^{VPO1}	Did not advance				12
Nisha Dahiya	Women's −68 kg	Rizhko (UKR); W 6–4 ^{VPO1}	Sol-gum (PRK); L 8–10 ^{VPO1}	Did not advance			7
Reetika Hooda	Women's −76 kg	Nagy (HUN); W 12–2 ^{VSU1}	Kyzy (KGZ); L 1–1 ^{VPO1}	Did not advance			7

Legend

- W – Win; L – Loss;
- VFA – Victory by fall
- VPO – Victory by nine or less points where the losing wrestler scores zero points.
- VPO1 – Victory by nine or less points where the losing wrestler scores at least one point.
- VSU – Victory by ten or more points where the losing wrestler scores zero points.
- VSU1 – Victory by ten or more points where the losing wrestler scores at least one point.

== See also ==
- India at the 2024 Winter Youth Olympics
- India at the 2024 Summer Paralympics
- India at the 2022 Asian Games
- 2024 Summer Olympics
