= Sarabjot Singh =

Indian sport shooter

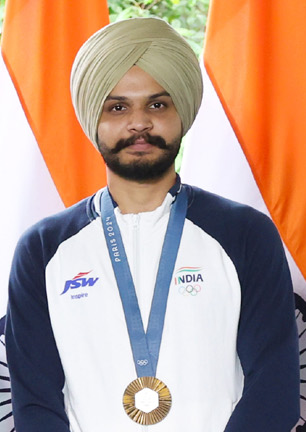
- Singh in 2024

Personal information
- Nationality: Indian
- Born: 30 September 2001 (age 25) Ambala, Barara, Haryana, India
- Education: DAV College, Chandigarh

Sport
- Sport: Shooting
- Event: 10 m air pistol
Medal record
Men's 10 m air pistol shooting
Representing India
Event	1st	2nd	3rd
Olympic Games	0	0	1
World Cup	3	0	0
Asian Games	1	1	0
Asian Championships	0	1	1
Junior World Championships	2	0	0
Junior World Cup	2	2	0
Junior Asian Championships	2	0	0
Total	10	4	2
Olympic Games
Bronze medal – third place	2024 Paris	Mixed Team
World Cup
Gold medal – first place	2023 Baku	Mixed Team
Gold medal – first place	2023 Bhopal	Individual
Gold medal – first place	2024 Munich	Individual
Asian Games
Gold medal – first place	2022 Hangzhou	Team
Silver medal – second place	2022 Hangzhou	Mixed Team
Asian Championships
Silver medal – second place	2023 Changwon	Mixed Team
Bronze medal – third place	2023 Changwon	Individual
Junior World Championships
Gold medal – first place	2021 Lima	Mixed Team
Gold medal – first place	2021 Lima	Team
Junior World Cup
Gold medal – first place	2019 Suhl	Individual
Gold medal – first place	2022 Suhl	Team
Silver medal – second place	2022 Suhl	Individual
Silver medal – second place	2022 Suhl	Mixed Team
Junior Asian Championships
Gold medal – first place	2019 Doha	Mixed Team
Gold medal – first place	2019 Taoyuan	Individual

Sarabjot Singh (born 30 September 2001) is an Indian sport shooter who specializes in the 10 m air pistol. He is an Olympic bronze medalist having won the medal at the 2024 Paris Olympics alongside Manu Bhaker.

== Early life and education ==
Sarabjot hails from Dheen village of Ambala, Barara block, Haryana. He is the son of Jatinder Singh, a farmer and Hardeep Kaur, a homemaker. He studied at DAV College, Sector 10, Chandigarh. He trains under coach Abhishek Rana at the Ambala Cantt-based AR Shooting Academy in Central Phoenix Club.

== Career ==
Singh was a part of the Indian shooting team at the 2022 Asian Games. Indian 10m air pistol team of Sarabjot Singh, Arjun Singh Cheema and Shiva Narwal beat China to win the gold at the 2022 Asian Games. Sarabjot also won the silver medal for India in the mixed 10m air pistol with Divya T.S. in the Asian Games shooting competitions.

Earlier in 2021, he won the gold in both the individual and team events of the World Championships. In 2019, he won gold in the ISSF Junior World Cup.

He won the bronze medal in 2024 Summer Olympics in Paris 10m air pistol Mixed Team event with Manu Bhaker.

== Awards and nominations ==
Year	Award	Category	Result	Ref.
2024	Indian Sports Honours	Sportsman of the Year	Nominated	
2024	Indian Sports Honours	Breakthrough Performance of the Year Male	Nominated	
