= Shooting at the 2022 Asian Games – Women's 10 metre air pistol =

Women's 10 metre air pistol at the 2022 Asian Games
- Venue: Fuyang Yinhu Sports Centre
- Dates: 29 September 2023
- Competitors: 58 from 25 nations

Medalists
gold medal	Palak Gulia	India
silver medal	Esha Singh	India
bronze medal	Kishmala Talat	Pakistan

The women's 10 metre air pistol competition at the 2022 Asian Games in Hangzhou, China was held on 29 September 2023 at Fuyang Yinhu Sports Centre. Palak Gulia of India won the gold medal.

== Schedule ==
All times are China Standard Time (UTC+08:00)

Date	Time	Event
Friday, 29 September 2023	09:00	Qualification
Friday, 29 September 2023	11:30	Final

== Records ==
Prior to this competition, the existing world, Asian and Games records were as follows.

Qualification
World Record	Jiang Ranxin (CHN)	591	Cairo, Egypt	15 October 2022
Asian Record	Jiang Ranxin (CHN)	591	Cairo, Egypt	15 October 2022
Games Record	Wang Qian (CHN)	580	Palembang, Indonesia	24 August 2018
Final
World Record	Zorana Arunović (SRB)	246.9	Maribor, Slovenia	11 March 2017
Asian Record	Yukari Konishi (JPN)	245.3	Wako, Japan	10 December 2017
Games Record	Wang Qian (CHN)	240.3	Palembang, Indonesia	24 August 2018

== Results ==
Legend

- DNS — Did not start

=== Qualification ===
Rank	Athlete	Series						Total	Xs	Notes
Rank	Athlete	1	2	3	4	5	6	Total	Xs	Notes
1	Zhao Nan (CHN)	96	98	96	97	98	96	581	21	GR
2	Jiang Ranxin (CHN)	96	99	99	100	93	94	581	21	GR
3	Kishmala Talat (PAK)	97	98	95	96	98	96	580	20	
4	Trịnh Thu Vinh (VIE)	98	97	95	97	97	96	580	17	
5	Esha Singh (IND)	95	97	95	99	97	96	579	17	
6	Wu Chia-ying (TPE)	95	97	97	95	97	97	578	21	
7	Palak Gulia (IND)	97	97	96	95	96	96	577	23	
8	Shing Ho Ching (HKG)	95	97	96	95	96	97	576	13	
9	Kim Bo-mi (KOR)	97	96	93	94	100	95	575	16	
10	Divya T. S. (IND)	95	97	95	99	93	96	575	10	
11	Li Xue (CHN)	97	97	94	97	93	96	574	24	
12	Yang Ji-in (KOR)	96	95	95	97	95	96	574	22	
13	Natsara Champalat (THA)	98	94	95	97	97	93	574	17	
14	Liu Heng-yu (TPE)	97	100	94	94	96	93	574	15	
15	Hanieh Rostamian (IRI)	96	96	95	96	94	96	573	14	
16	Irina Yunusmetova (KAZ)	95	96	98	94	95	95	573	13	
17	Arista Perdana Putri Darmoyo (INA)	96	95	96	98	94	94	573	12	
18	Teh Xiu Hong (SGP)	94	95	94	96	98	95	572	20	
19	Yu Ai-wen (TPE)	95	92	97	97	95	95	571	17	
20	Golnoush Sebghatollahi (IRI)	97	93	98	95	94	94	571	17	
21	Kamonlak Saencha (THA)	96	94	96	94	95	96	571	14	
22	Nguyễn Thùy Trang (VIE)	95	95	96	96	94	94	570	16	
23	Mina Ghorbani (IRI)	92	92	97	97	97	95	570	14	
24	Enkhbatyn Khishigdelger (MGL)	96	93	95	96	96	94	570	14	
25	Bibiana Ng (MAS)	94	94	98	93	94	96	569	19	
26	Chizuru Sasaki (JPN)	96	93	96	92	96	96	569	17	
27	Nurul Syasya Nadiah Arifin (MAS)	95	95	93	95	98	93	569	16	
28	Tömörchödöriin Bayartsetseg (MGL)	95	87	93	98	100	96	569	15	
29	Franchette Quiroz (PHI)	97	96	95	94	97	90	569	14	
30	Satoko Yamada (JPN)	93	96	95	93	97	95	569	13	
31	Surassawadee Bubphachat (THA)	97	92	92	98	94	96	569	11	
32	Tsolmonbaataryn Anudari (MGL)	96	94	98	92	93	95	568	16	
33	Anjila Amjad Antu (BAN)	95	93	95	95	95	94	567	15	
34	Joseline Cheah (MAS)	98	91	94	95	95	94	567	13	
35	Lee Si-yoon (KOR)	93	92	96	94	95	97	567	12	
36	Rihadatul Asyifa (INA)	93	96	93	94	93	96	565	11	
37	Olga Axenova (KAZ)	92	95	97	92	93	96	565	11	
38	Teo Shun Xie (SGP)	94	94	95	97	93	91	564	19	
39	Nguyễn Thị Hương (VIE)	91	92	95	96	96	94	564	12	
40	Asma Abu Rabee (JOR)	92	95	93	96	94	92	562	11	
41	Sitora Ergashboeva (UZB)	94	94	92	94	96	91	561	8	
42	Teh Xiu Yi (SGP)	95	93	93	93	92	92	558	10	
43	Mika Zaitsu (JPN)	91	94	92	93	92	95	557	13	
44	Fahmida Alam (BAN)	93	90	95	93	91	95	557	9	
45	Hebah Al-Kilani (JOR)	93	92	94	93	92	93	557	6	
46	Yasameen Al-Raimi (YEM)	90	93	96	93	94	89	555	11	
47	Hoi Chi Wai (MAC)	91	93	94	94	93	88	553	7	
48	Ghaya Al-Shuhail (UAE)	91	91	97	91	91	90	551	11	
49	Chao Cho Sin (MAC)	90	87	95	94	91	94	551	8	
50	Saule Alimbek (KAZ)	93	90	94	93	92	87	549	9	
51	Nasra Mohammed (QAT)	93	92	90	91	92	91	549	7	
52	Chao Mei Kam (MAC)	92	89	92	88	94	92	547	9	
53	Armin Asa (BAN)	94	92	88	88	93	91	546	6	
54	Amerah Awad (KUW)	88	93	91	85	87	92	536	7	
55	Ahlam Al-Naggar (YEM)	88	89	84	88	91	92	532	4	
56	Elvie Baldivino (PHI)	84	86	89	89	88	88	524	3	
—	Noora Al-Mutawa (QAT)							DNS		
—	Cristina Ximenes (TLS)							DNS		

=== Final ===
Rank	Athlete	1st stage		2nd stage – Elimination							S-off	Notes
Rank	Athlete	1	2	1	2	3	4	5	6	7	S-off	Notes
1st place, gold medalist(s)	Palak Gulia (IND)	49.9	100.7	120.8	141.0	162.0	182.2	201.8	222.0	242.1		GR
2nd place, silver medalist(s)	Esha Singh (IND)	50.8	101.0	120.3	139.6	159.7	180.1	200.0	219.7	239.7		
3rd place, bronze medalist(s)	Kishmala Talat (PAK)	49.2	98.9	118.7	139.2	158.9	179.9	199.9	218.2			
4	Wu Chia-ying (TPE)	49.3	99.4	120.5	138.6	159.5	179.2	199.3				
5	Jiang Ranxin (CHN)	47.7	98.0	117.1	137.5	157.2	176.8					
6	Trịnh Thu Vinh (VIE)	48.0	97.9	117.4	136.4	156.2						
7	Zhao Nan (CHN)	48.6	97.0	116.6	136.4						SO	
8	Shing Ho Ching (HKG)	50.9	95.7	116.4								
