= Kishmala Talat =

Pakistani sports shooter

Personal information
- Nationality: Pakistani
- Born: 18 June 2002 (age 24) Rawalpindi, Pakistan
- Education: Bachelor of Communication and Media Studies; Fatima Jinnah Women University

Sport
- Sport: Shooting
- Events: 10 m air pistol 25 m air pistol
Medal record
Women's shooting
Representing Pakistan
Asian Games
Bronze medal – third place	2022 Hangzhou	10 m air pistol
Asian Championships
Silver medal – second place	2024 Jakarta	10m air pistol
Bronze medal – third place	2024 Jakarta	10m air pistol mixed team
South Asian Games
Silver medal – second place	2019 Kathmandu and Pokhara	10m air pistol team

Kishmala Talat (born 18 June 2002) is a Pakistani sports shooter who made history as the country's first-ever medalist in shooting at the Asian Games, winning bronze in the 10 m air pistol at the 2022 Asian Games. In 2024, she won silver in the same event at the Asian Championships in Jakarta, becoming the first Pakistani woman to directly qualify for the Olympics in shooting. In the same event with her teammate Gulfam Joseph, she also won a bronze medal in the mixed team event. At the 2024 Paris Olympics, she competed in the 10 m air pistol, 25 m pistol, and 10 m air pistol mixed team events but did not advance to the finals in any.

== Career ==
At the 2019 South Asian Games, Talat won a silver medal. In 2022, she received an IOC scholarship.

In 2023, Talat won a bronze medal in the women's 10 metre air pistol at the 2022 Asian Games.

In 2024, she won silver in the 10 m air pistol at the Asian Rifle/Pistol Championships in Jakarta, becoming the first Pakistani woman to earn a direct Olympic berth. Her direct qualification marked a milestone in Pakistan’s female Olympic shooting, building on the foundation laid by Minhal Sohail, who represented Pakistan at the 2016 Rio Olympics through a quota spot. She also took bronze in the mixed team event with Gulfam Joseph. At the Paris Olympics, she competed in three events, finishing 31st (10 m air pistol), 22nd (25 m pistol), and 14th (mixed team), but did not reach the finals.

== Competition record ==
Year	Competition	Venue	Event	Score	Rank
2022	World Championships	Cairo, Egypt	10m Air Pistol Mixed Team	578	8th
2022	World Championships	Cairo, Egypt	10m Air Pistol Women	560	76th
2022	ISSF World Cup	Changwon, South Korea	10m Air Pistol Mixed Team	570	9th
2022	ISSF World Cup	Changwon, South Korea	10m Air Pistol Women	569	20th
2023	World Championships	Baku, Azerbaijan	25m Pistol Women	583	9th
2023	World Championships	Baku, Azerbaijan	10m Air Pistol Women	575	16th
2023	World Championships	Baku, Azerbaijan	10m Air Pistol Mixed Team	570	36th
2023	Asian Championships	Changwon, South Korea	10m Air Pistol Mixed Team	581 (Medal Matches: 13)	5th
2023	Asian Championships	Changwon, South Korea	10m Air Pistol Women	575	14th
2023	Asian Championships	Changwon, South Korea	25m Pistol Women	578	21st
2023	Asian Games	Hangzhou, China	10m Air Pistol Women	580 (Final: 218.2)	3rd
2024	Olympic Games	Paris, France	10m Air Pistol Mixed Team	571	14th
2024	Olympic Games	Paris, France	25m Pistol Women	579	22nd
2024	Olympic Games	Paris, France	10m Air Pistol Women	567	31st
2024	ISSF World Cup	Baku, Azerbaijan	10m Air Pistol Women	575	9th
2024	ISSF World Cup	Baku, Azerbaijan	10m Air Pistol Mixed Team	576	9th
2024	ISSF World Cup	Baku, Azerbaijan	25m Pistol Women	582	15th
2024	ISSF World Cup	Baku, Azerbaijan	25m Pistol Women	578	24th
2024	Asian Championships	Jakarta, Indonesia	10m Air Pistol Women	575 (Final: 236.3)	2nd
2024	Asian Championships	Jakarta, Indonesia	10m Air Pistol Mixed Team	577 (Medal Matches: 16)	3rd
2024	Asian Championships	Jakarta, Indonesia	25m Pistol Women	569	29th
2025	Asian Championships	Shymkent, Kazakhstan	10m Air Pistol Women	576	11th
2025	Asian Championships	Shymkent, Kazakhstan	10m Air Pistol Mixed Team	573	14th
2025	Asian Championships	Shymkent, Kazakhstan	25m Pistol Women	572	21st
2026	ISSF World Cup	Hangzhou, China	10m Air Pistol Women	575	21st
2026	ISSF World Cup	Munich, Germany	25m Pistol Women	580	22nd
2026	ISSF World Cup	Hangzhou, China	25m Pistol Women	574	39th
2026	ISSF World Cup	Munich, Germany	10m Air Pistol Women	569	53rd
