= Sandeep Singh (shooter) =

Indian sport shooter

Sandeep Singh (born 20 January 1996) is an Indian sport shooter from Punjab. He competes in the 10m air rifle discipline. He qualified for the 2024 Summer Olympics in Paris in both the individual 10m air rifle and mixed events.

== Early life and education ==
Singh was born in Behbal Khurd village, near Faridkot. He began as a cross-country athlete as he wanted to appear for the army recruitment test. His father, Baljinder Singh is a labourer. He is a naib subedar in the Indian Army. He joined the Sikh Light Infantry in 2014 as a sepoy.

== Career ==
Singh caught the eye with high scores in 2023. He was part of the Indian mixed team in the Rio de Janeiro World Cup in September 2023, where he was ranked 5th. In 2024, he took part in the World Cup events at Cairo, Munich and Granada. He also took part in the Asian Championships at Jakarta.

He qualified for the Paris Olympics at the Indian Olympic selection trials held at the Madhya Pradesh shooting range in Bhopal in May 2024 and stood first. He beat Olympic quota winner Arjun Babuta and Rudranksh Patil, a world champion. Both of them had an additional point but could not beat the scores of Singh. In the Olympic 10m air rifle event, he shot 629.3 and finished 12th in the qualification round and could not advance further. Even in the 10m air rifle team event, along with Elavenil Valarivan, he finished 12th and were eliminated.
