= Jyothika Sri Dandi =

Indian athlete

Personal information
- Nationality: Indian
- Born: 16 July 2000 (age 26)

Sport
- Sport: Athletics
- Event: Sprint

Achievements and titles
- Personal bests: 400m: 52.73 (Trivandrum, 2024)
Medal record
Women's athletics
Representing India
Asian Athletics Championships
Bronze medal – third place	2023 Bangkok	4x400m relay

Jyothika Sri Dandi (born 16 July 2000) is an Indian sprinter. In 2023, she became the Indian national champion over 400 metres.

== Early life ==
She is from Tanuku town in the West Godavari district of Andhra Pradesh. She was inspired to take up athletics by her father, Srinivasa Rao, who is a body builder.

== Career ==
She had a breakthrough in 2021 when she won the Indian national U23 National Championships over 400 metres.

She won the Indian National Open Championships over 400 metres in Thiruvananthapuram on 6 March 2023 with a time of 53.26 seconds. In July 2023, she was a bronze medalist in the women's 4 x 400 metres relay at the 2023 Asian Athletics Championships in Bangkok.

In March 2024, she ran a personal best time of 52.73 seconds at the Indian National Championships in Thiruvananthapuram.

In May 2024, she ran as part of the Indian 4 × 400 m relay team at the 2024 World Relays Championships in Nassau, Bahamas. She ran the fastest leg of the quarter as they qualified for the 2024 Paris Olympics. She subsequently competed in the women's 4 x 400 metres relay at the 2024 Paris Olympics.
