= Kim Song-guk (sport shooter) =

North Korean sports shooter (born 1985)

Personal information
- Born: 5 October 1985 (age 40)

Sport
- Country: North Korea
- Sport: Sports shooting
Medal record
Men's shooting
Representing North Korea
Olympic Games
Bronze medal – third place	2016 Rio de Janeiro	50m pistol
Asian Championships
Gold medal – first place	2019 Doha	10 m air pistol

- Kim Song-guk
- Hangul: 김성국
- RR: Gim Seongguk
- MR: Kim Sŏngguk

Kim Song-guk (Korean: 김성국; pronounced [kim.sʌŋ.ɡuk̚]; born 5 October 1985) is a North Korean sports shooter. He won the bronze medal in the men's 50 metre pistol at the 2016 Summer Olympics. He also competed in the men's 10 metre air pistol event.

He set the world record for the men's 10 meter air pistol in 2019 with a score of 246.5
