= Zhang Bowen =

Chinese sport shooter (born 1996)

Personal information
- Nationality: Chinese
- Born: 28 April 1996 (age 30) Binzhou, China

Sport
- Sport: Shooting
Medal record
Men's shooting
Representing China
World Championships
Gold medal – first place	2022 Cairo	10 m air pistol team
Gold medal – first place	2023 Baku	10 m air pistol
Gold medal – first place	2023 Baku	10 m air pistol team
Gold medal – first place	2023 Baku	50 m pistol team
Silver medal – second place	2022 Cairo	50 m pistol
Bronze medal – third place	2022 Cairo	10 m air pistol mixed team
Bronze medal – third place	2023 Baku	10 m air pistol mixed team
Asian Games
Gold medal – first place	2022 Hangzhou	10 m air pistol team
Silver medal – second place	2022 Hangzhou	10 m air pistol mixed team
Asian Championships
Gold medal – first place	2023 Changwon	10 m air pistol team
Universiade
Silver medal – second place	2019 Napoli	10 m air pistol

Zhang Bowen (born 28 April 1996) is a Chinese sport shooter. He represented China at the 2020 Summer Olympics in Tokyo, competing in the men's 10 m air pistol. He clinched three gold medals and a bronze at the 2023 ISSF World Championships. He also won a gold and a silver at the 2022 Asian Games.
