= Shiva Narwal =

Indian sport shooter

Personal information
- Nationality: Indian

Sport
- Country: India
- Sport: shooting
Medal record
Men's shooting
Representing India
Asian Games
Gold medal – first place	2022 Hangzhou	10m air pistol team
Asian Championships
Gold medal – first place	2022 Daegu	10 m air pistol
Gold medal – first place	2022 Daegu	10 m air pistol team

Shiva Narwal is an Indian sport shooter. He won the bronze medal in the ISSF world cup 10m Air Pistol mixed event along with Palak. He won the gold medal in Men's 10m air pistol team in the 2022 Asian Games.
