= Divya T. S. =

Indian sport shooter (born 1995)

Divya Thadigol Subbaraju (born 14 August 1995) is an Indian sport shooter from Karnataka. She competes in the ISSF 10 meter air pistol discipline. She became the National Champion in 10m Air Pistol 2022. She was part of the Indian shooting team at the Asian Games, Hangzhou, China and won 2 Silver medals.

== Early life ==
Divya hails from Bengaluru and trains under coach Manjunath Patagar. She played basketball initially but shifted to shooting. While training at Bhopal for the National selection trials, Divya met with a freak accident and injured herself. But despite the blurred vision and pain she returned to regular practice and made it to the Indian team for the Cairo event in 2023.

== Career ==
- 2022: In December, Divya won her first women's 10m air pistol National title at the 65th National Shooting Championship at the MP Academy Shooting range in Bhopal.
- 2023: In March she came fifth in the World Cup at Bhopal. She took part in the 10m Air Pistol mixed team event and women's individual event.
- 2023: In May, she won a gold along with Sarabjot Singh in the 10m Air Pistol mixed team event at the ISSF World Cup at Baku, Azerbaijan.
