= Lee Won-ho =

South Korean pistol shooter

Personal information
- Born: 15 August 1999 (age 27) Busan, South Korea

Sport
- Country: South Korea
- Sport: Sports shooting
Medal record
Men's shooting
Representing South Korea
Asian Games
Silver medal – second place	2022 Hangzhou	Men's 10 m air pistol
Bronze medal – third place	2022 Hangzhou	Mixed 10 m air pistol team
Asian Championships
Silver medal – second place	2023 Changwon	10 m air pistol team
Silver medal – second place	2025 Shymkent	Mixed Team 10 m air pistol
Bronze medal – third place	2023 Changwon	Mixed 10 m air pistol team
Bronze medal – third place	2024 Jakarta	10m air pistol team
Bronze medal – third place	2025 Shymkent	50 m pistol team

Lee Won-ho (born 15 August 1999) is a South Korean sport shooter. He competed in the men's 10 metre air pistol event at the 2024 Summer Olympics.
