= Gulfam Joseph =

Pakistani sports shooter

Personal information
- Nationality: Pakistani
- Born: 17 December 1999 (age 26)

Sport
- Sport: Sports shooting
Medal record
Men's shooting
Representing Pakistan
Asian Championships
Bronze medal – third place	2024 Jakarta	10m air Pistol Mixed Team

Gulfam Joseph (born 17 December 1999) is a Pakistani sports shooter. He competed in the Men's 10 metre air pistol event at the 2020 Summer Olympics and the 2024 Summer Olympics.
