= Arjun Singh Cheema =

Indian sport shooter (born 2001)

Medal record

Men's shooting

Representing India

Asian Championships
Bronze medal – third place	2019 Doha	50 m pistol
Bronze medal – third place	2019 Doha	50 m pistol team

Arjun Singh Cheema (born 13 June 2001) is an Indian sport shooter from Punjab. He competes in the 10m air pistol discipline. He was part of the Indian shooting team that won the 10m air pistol team gold at the 2022 Asian Games, Hangzhou, China.

== Early life ==
Arjun is born in Mandi Gobindgarh, Punjab. He did his schooling at Om Prakash Bansal Model School, Mandi Gobindgarh. He comes from a sports family. His grand father Sardar Balwinder Singh played football for India while his uncle Jagwinder Singh Cheema holds an Asian Junior Powerlifting record. He started as a swimmer and took part in an International Junior Swimming Championship in Austria before switching to shooting.

== Career ==
Arjun Singh started his professional career in 2015 under the coaches Joshi Parvez, Kumar Holinder and Jaspal Rana. In 2023, he was part of the 3-member team that won gold for India in the 10m air pistol team event at the 2022 Asian Games. In 2019, he won two gold medals at the 52nd ISSF World Championship held in South Korea. In 2018, he was also part of the Indian team that won team gold at the ISSF Junior World Cups held in Suhl and Sydney. In 2018, he also won the gold at the World Championships in 50m pistol for Junior men in Changwon, Korea. In April 2024, Cheema topped the second Indian Olympic qualifiers held at New Delhi ahead of Ravinder Singh and Olympic quota winner Varun Tomar. He also reportedly lost a bonus point due to an error by the officials.
