= Shooting at the 2014 Asian Games – Men's 10 metre air pistol =

Men's 10 metre air pistol at the 2014 Asian Games
- Venue: Ongnyeon International Shooting Range
- Dates: 21 September 2014
- Competitors: 58 from 24 nations

Medalists
| gold medal | Kim Cheong-yong | South Korea |
| silver medal | Pang Wei | China |
| bronze medal | Jin Jong-oh | South Korea |

The men's 10 metre air pistol competition at the 2014 Asian Games in Incheon, South Korea was held on 21 September at the Ongnyeon International Shooting Range.

== Schedule ==
All times are Korea Standard Time (UTC+09:00)

| Date | Time | Event |
|---|---|---|
| Sunday, 21 September 2014 | 09:00 | Qualification |
| Sunday, 21 September 2014 | 11:30 | Final |

== Records ==
Prior to this competition, the existing world, Asian and Games records were as follows.

Qualification
| World Record | Jin Jong-oh (KOR) | 594 | Changwon, South Korea | 12 April 2009 |
| Asian Record | Jin Jong-oh (KOR) | 594 | Changwon, South Korea | 12 April 2009 |
| Games Record | Tan Zongliang (CHN) | 590 | Busan, South Korea | 3 October 2002 |
Final
| World Record | Hoàng Xuân Vinh (VIE) | 202.8 | Fort Benning, United States | 29 March 2014 |
| Asian Record | Hoàng Xuân Vinh (VIE) | 202.8 | Fort Benning, United States | 29 March 2014 |
| Games Record | — | — | — | — |

== Results ==
Legend

- DNS — Did not start

=== Qualification ===
| Rank | Athlete | Series | | | | | | Total | Xs | Notes |
| Rank | Athlete | 1 | 2 | 3 | 4 | 5 | 6 | Total | Xs | Notes |
|---|---|---|---|---|---|---|---|---|---|---|
| 1 | Rashid Yunusmetov (KAZ) | 98 | 96 | 98 | 98 | 99 | 97 | 586 | 23 | |
| 2 | Jitu Rai (IND) | 97 | 99 | 95 | 98 | 97 | 99 | 585 | 27 | |
| 3 | Pang Wei (CHN) | 99 | 99 | 99 | 99 | 95 | 94 | 585 | 26 | |
| 4 | Kim Cheong-yong (KOR) | 97 | 99 | 94 | 99 | 100 | 96 | 585 | 23 | |
| 5 | Pu Qifeng (CHN) | 98 | 96 | 97 | 96 | 98 | 98 | 583 | 25 | |
| 6 | Hoàng Xuân Vinh (VIE) | 97 | 98 | 96 | 96 | 98 | 98 | 583 | 13 | |
| 7 | Jin Jong-oh (KOR) | 96 | 97 | 100 | 95 | 97 | 96 | 581 | 29 | |
| 8 | Trần Quốc Cường (VIE) | 98 | 96 | 96 | 96 | 97 | 97 | 580 | 23 | |
| 9 | Samaresh Jung (IND) | 97 | 97 | 97 | 95 | 96 | 98 | 580 | 18 | |
| 10 | Vyacheslav Podlesniy (KAZ) | 97 | 97 | 98 | 97 | 96 | 95 | 580 | 17 | |
| 11 | Tomoyuki Matsuda (JPN) | 99 | 99 | 96 | 96 | 97 | 92 | 579 | 21 | |
| 12 | Enkhtaivany Davaakhüü (MGL) | 94 | 95 | 98 | 95 | 99 | 98 | 579 | 18 | |
| 13 | Lee Dae-myung (KOR) | 98 | 96 | 95 | 95 | 98 | 96 | 578 | 19 | |
| 14 | Prakash Nanjappa (IND) | 94 | 98 | 96 | 97 | 97 | 96 | 578 | 19 | |
| 15 | Kojiro Horimizu (JPN) | 95 | 98 | 99 | 93 | 96 | 97 | 578 | 14 | |
| 16 | Oleg Engachev (QAT) | 95 | 95 | 97 | 95 | 96 | 99 | 577 | 14 | |
| 17 | Vladimir Issachenko (KAZ) | 96 | 96 | 95 | 97 | 95 | 97 | 576 | 22 | |
| 18 | Man Chun Kit (HKG) | 97 | 95 | 96 | 96 | 96 | 96 | 576 | 18 | |
| 19 | Gai Bin (SIN) | 95 | 95 | 97 | 97 | 94 | 98 | 576 | 16 | |
| 20 | Hamad Al-Namshan (KUW) | 98 | 94 | 95 | 97 | 96 | 95 | 575 | 18 | |
| 21 | Wang Zhiwei (CHN) | 96 | 98 | 95 | 95 | 96 | 95 | 575 | 14 | |
| 22 | Johnathan Wong (MAS) | 97 | 94 | 95 | 98 | 96 | 94 | 574 | 18 | |
| 23 | Jettakan Chokkaeo (THA) | 90 | 96 | 97 | 95 | 98 | 96 | 572 | 18 | |
| 24 | Poh Lip Meng (SIN) | 94 | 96 | 94 | 96 | 96 | 96 | 572 | 12 | |
| 25 | Masaru Nakashige (JPN) | 95 | 93 | 97 | 93 | 97 | 96 | 571 | 16 | |
| 26 | Kasem Khamhaeng (THA) | 97 | 94 | 96 | 94 | 95 | 95 | 571 | 16 | |
| 27 | Abdulmajed Abdulkhaliq (BRN) | 97 | 94 | 96 | 96 | 96 | 91 | 570 | 16 | |
| 28 | Kalim Ullah Khan (PAK) | 94 | 96 | 92 | 95 | 96 | 97 | 570 | 15 | |
| 29 | Wong Siu Lung (HKG) | 92 | 96 | 97 | 94 | 96 | 94 | 569 | 18 | |
| 30 | Nguyễn Hoàng Phương (VIE) | 95 | 92 | 97 | 92 | 95 | 98 | 569 | 16 | |
| 31 | Ebrahim Barkhordari (IRI) | 96 | 94 | 94 | 97 | 92 | 96 | 569 | 15 | |
| 32 | Mohammad Ahmadi (IRI) | 97 | 95 | 92 | 96 | 96 | 93 | 569 | 12 | |
| 33 | Ebrahim Rahimi (IRI) | 92 | 95 | 96 | 96 | 98 | 91 | 568 | 17 | |
| 34 | Atallah Al-Anazi (KSA) | 96 | 93 | 93 | 97 | 96 | 93 | 568 | 10 | |
| 35 | Choo Wen Yan (MAS) | 95 | 95 | 96 | 93 | 99 | 89 | 567 | 14 | |
| 36 | Uzair Ahmed (PAK) | 91 | 96 | 94 | 96 | 97 | 93 | 567 | 11 | |
| 37 | Lim Swee Hon (SIN) | 96 | 94 | 93 | 91 | 98 | 95 | 567 | 9 | |
| 38 | Ye Tun Naung (MYA) | 96 | 95 | 92 | 95 | 94 | 94 | 566 | 12 | |
| 39 | Eddy Chew (MAS) | 94 | 95 | 93 | 95 | 96 | 92 | 565 | 14 | |
| 40 | Tarasatid Varidputimate (THA) | 93 | 94 | 95 | 94 | 95 | 94 | 565 | 10 | |
| 41 | Jamal Al-Hattali (OMA) | 95 | 94 | 95 | 95 | 93 | 92 | 564 | 11 | |
| 42 | Aqeel Al-Badrani (KSA) | 94 | 93 | 91 | 95 | 94 | 96 | 563 | 8 | |
| 43 | Altanbaganyn Altankhuyag (MGL) | 92 | 94 | 97 | 94 | 95 | 91 | 563 | 6 | |
| 44 | Azizjon Mukhamedrakhimov (QAT) | 94 | 94 | 93 | 93 | 94 | 94 | 562 | 16 | |
| 45 | Safar Al-Dosari (KSA) | 93 | 93 | 92 | 95 | 94 | 95 | 562 | 11 | |
| 46 | Fadi Hamdan (SYR) | 94 | 94 | 94 | 96 | 94 | 88 | 560 | 10 | |
| 47 | Vladimir Svechnikov (UZB) | 91 | 96 | 92 | 93 | 93 | 93 | 558 | 15 | |
| 48 | Medaith Al-Sahli (KUW) | 93 | 92 | 93 | 90 | 93 | 96 | 557 | 9 | |
| 49 | Lok Chan Tou (MAC) | 89 | 94 | 92 | 93 | 93 | 95 | 556 | 9 | |
| 50 | Che Seak Hong (MAC) | 93 | 95 | 91 | 92 | 92 | 91 | 554 | 6 | |
| 51 | Ali Al-Mutairi (KUW) | 91 | 93 | 93 | 89 | 93 | 94 | 553 | 5 | |
| 52 | Baljinnyamyn Sainnasan (MGL) | 87 | 94 | 95 | 90 | 94 | 89 | 549 | 11 | |
| 53 | Dzhafar Shermatov (TJK) | 89 | 90 | 92 | 89 | 94 | 91 | 545 | 8 | |
| 54 | Eradzhbek Kuchkarov (TJK) | 90 | 91 | 92 | 91 | 87 | 90 | 541 | 6 | |
| 55 | Nurmukhammad Arutyunyan (TJK) | 89 | 89 | 91 | 85 | 88 | 91 | 533 | 9 | |
| 56 | Lou U Seng (MAC) | 84 | 88 | 89 | 91 | 92 | 88 | 532 | 4 | |
| 57 | Keevi Pun (NEP) | 83 | 84 | 88 | 92 | 87 | 91 | 525 | 7 | |
| — | Khalid Rashid Al-Muhannadi (QAT) | | | | | | | DNS | | |

=== Final ===
| Rank | Athlete | 1st stage | | 2nd stage – Elimination | | | | | | | S-off | Notes |
| Rank | Athlete | 1 | 2 | 1 | 2 | 3 | 4 | 5 | 6 | 7 | S-off | Notes |
|---|---|---|---|---|---|---|---|---|---|---|---|---|
| 1st place, gold medalist(s) | Kim Cheong-yong (KOR) | 31.3 | 60.5 | 81.4 | 101.3 | 122.0 | 142.0 | 162.5 | 182.4 | 201.2 | | GR |
| 2nd place, silver medalist(s) | Pang Wei (CHN) | 31.0 | 58.9 | 79.9 | 99.4 | 120.0 | 139.2 | 160.3 | 179.5 | 199.3 | | |
| 3rd place, bronze medalist(s) | Jin Jong-oh (KOR) | 29.5 | 60.3 | 80.0 | 99.6 | 119.7 | 141.0 | 158.8 | 179.3 | | | |
| 4 | Rashid Yunusmetov (KAZ) | 29.0 | 59.8 | 80.0 | 99.3 | 120.0 | 138.6 | 157.9 | | | | |
| 5 | Jitu Rai (IND) | 29.8 | 60.7 | 80.4 | 101.3 | 118.9 | 138.3 | | | | | |
| 6 | Trần Quốc Cường (VIE) | 30.7 | 60.5 | 79.2 | 99.2 | 118.0 | | | | | | |
| 7 | Hoàng Xuân Vinh (VIE) | 28.7 | 57.1 | 78.2 | 98.4 | | | | | | | |
| 8 | Pu Qifeng (CHN) | 29.9 | 59.3 | 77.2 | | | | | | | | |
