= Shooting at the 2014 Asian Games – Men's 50 metre pistol team =

Men's 50 metre pistol at the 2014 Asian Games
- Venue: Ongnyeon International Shooting Range
- Dates: 20 September 2014
- Competitors: 39 from 13 nations

Medalists
gold medal	China; Pang Wei, Pu Qifeng, Wang Zhiwei
silver medal	South Korea; Choi Young-rae, Jin Jong-oh, Lee Dae-myung
bronze medal	Vietnam; Hoàng Xuân Vinh, Nguyễn Hoàng Phương, Trần Quốc Cường

The men's 50 metre pistol team competition at the 2014 Asian Games in Incheon, South Korea was held on 20 September at the Ongnyeon International Shooting Range.

== Schedule ==
All times are Korea Standard Time (UTC+09:00)

Date	Time	Event
Saturday, 20 September 2014	09:30	Final

== Records ==
Prior to this competition, the existing world, Asian and Games records were as follows.

World Record	Romania	1719	Osijek, Yugoslavia	7 September 1985
Asian Record	China	1699	Lahti, Finland	8 July 2002
Games Record	China	1690	Busan, South Korea	2 October 2002

== Results ==
Rank	Team	Series						Total	Xs	Notes
Rank	Team	1	2	3	4	5	6	Total	Xs	Notes
1st place, gold medalist(s)	China (CHN)	281	286	275	286	282	282	1692	42	GR
	Pang Wei	95	96	89	97	94	96	567	14	
	Pu Qifeng	92	94	95	92	97	94	564	19	
	Wang Zhiwei	94	96	91	97	91	92	561	9	
2nd place, silver medalist(s)	South Korea (KOR)	272	277	279	279	282	281	1670	31	
	Choi Young-rae	90	92	91	92	93	91	549	11	
	Jin Jong-oh	94	96	94	95	94	95	568	13	
	Lee Dae-myung	88	89	94	92	95	95	553	7	
3rd place, bronze medalist(s)	Vietnam (VIE)	279	282	274	284	284	267	1670	25	
	Hoàng Xuân Vinh	92	96	96	97	97	90	568	11	
	Nguyễn Hoàng Phương	94	93	88	95	94	93	557	5	
	Trần Quốc Cường	93	93	90	92	93	84	545	9	
4	India (IND)	272	286	276	278	279	274	1665	27	
	Om Prakash	91	92	93	92	95	92	555	8	
	Jitu Rai	92	97	92	93	92	93	559	13	
	Omkar Singh	89	97	91	93	92	89	551	6	
5	Singapore (SIN)	276	276	281	274	279	270	1656	31	
	Gai Bin	92	87	93	92	91	89	544	8	
	Lim Swee Hon	92	95	94	92	95	91	559	15	
	Poh Lip Meng	92	94	94	90	93	90	553	8	
6	Japan (JPN)	268	271	279	276	278	270	1642	17	
	Kojiro Horimizu	86	90	94	95	89	90	544	5	
	Tomoyuki Matsuda	90	93	94	93	94	91	555	9	
	Masaru Nakashige	92	88	91	88	95	89	543	3	
7	Iran (IRI)	260	272	279	269	280	280	1640	21	
	Mohammad Ahmadi	87	92	95	89	94	96	553	11	
	Ebrahim Barkhordari	89	89	93	92	94	93	550	5	
	Ebrahim Rahimi	84	91	91	88	92	91	537	5	
8	Kazakhstan (KAZ)	271	266	271	284	280	266	1638	20	
	Vladimir Issachenko	94	92	89	94	95	89	553	9	
	Vyacheslav Podlesniy	91	85	93	95	92	87	543	6	
	Rashid Yunusmetov	86	89	89	95	93	90	542	5	
9	Thailand (THA)	270	276	272	267	269	273	1627	17	
	Kanitpong Gongkum	91	91	90	87	92	91	542	7	
	Kasem Khamhaeng	92	92	90	89	90	94	547	6	
	Adisak Saleenosak	87	93	92	91	87	88	538	4	
10	Saudi Arabia (KSA)	274	269	270	272	273	264	1622	25	
	Mohammed Al-Amri	87	87	89	87	88	83	521	4	
	Atallah Al-Anazi	93	93	92	92	88	91	549	9	
	Aqeel Al-Badrani	94	89	89	93	97	90	552	12	
11	Malaysia (MAS)	269	263	274	269	266	264	1605	27	
	Eddy Chew	90	92	91	87	84	85	529	8	
	Choo Wen Yan	85	82	92	90	89	88	526	11	
	Johnathan Wong	94	89	91	92	93	91	550	8	
12	Kuwait (KUW)	263	261	263	258	258	262	1565	12	
	Ali Al-Mutairi	88	89	88	84	81	86	516	4	
	Hamad Al-Namshan	91	90	88	85	88	94	536	6	
	Medaith Al-Sahli	84	82	87	89	89	82	513	2	
13	Mongolia (MGL)	247	253	264	265	269	262	1560	18	
	Altanbaganyn Altankhuyag	84	90	85	91	93	84	527	4	
	Enkhtaivany Davaakhüü	91	93	90	93	91	92	550	13	
	Baljinnyamyn Sainnasan	72	70	89	81	85	86	483	1	
