= Shooting at the 2014 Asian Games – Men's 10 metre air pistol team =

Men's 10 metre air pistol team at the 2014 Asian Games
- Venue: Ongnyeon International Shooting Range
- Dates: 21 September 2014
- Competitors: 48 from 16 nations

Medalists
gold medal	South Korea; Jin Jong-oh, Kim Cheong-yong, Lee Dae-myung
silver medal	China; Pang Wei, Pu Qifeng, Wang Zhiwei
bronze medal	India; Samaresh Jung, Prakash Nanjappa, Jitu Rai

The men's 10 metre air pistol team competition at the 2014 Asian Games in Incheon, South Korea was held on 21 September at the Ongnyeon International Shooting Range.

== Schedule ==
All times are Korea Standard Time (UTC+09:00)

Date	Time	Event
Sunday, 21 September 2014	09:00	Final

== Records ==
Prior to this competition, the existing world, Asian and Games records were as follows.

World Record	Russia	1759	Deauville, France	16 March 2007
Asian Record	China	1759	Kuwait City, Kuwait	9 March 2014
Games Record	China	1750	Busan, South Korea	3 October 2002

== Results ==
Legend

- DNS — Did not start

Rank	Team	Series						Total	Xs	Notes
Rank	Team	1	2	3	4	5	6	Total	Xs	Notes
1st place, gold medalist(s)	South Korea (KOR)	291	292	289	289	295	288	1744	71	
	Jin Jong-oh	96	97	100	95	97	96	581	29	
	Kim Cheong-yong	97	99	94	99	100	96	585	23	
	Lee Dae-myung	98	96	95	95	98	96	578	19	
2nd place, silver medalist(s)	China (CHN)	293	293	291	290	289	287	1743	65	
	Pang Wei	99	99	99	99	95	94	585	26	
	Pu Qifeng	98	96	97	96	98	98	583	25	
	Wang Zhiwei	96	98	95	95	96	95	575	14	
3rd place, bronze medalist(s)	India (IND)	288	294	288	290	290	293	1743	64	
	Samaresh Jung	97	97	97	95	96	98	580	18	
	Prakash Nanjappa	94	98	96	97	97	96	578	19	
	Jitu Rai	97	99	95	98	97	99	585	27	
4	Kazakhstan (KAZ)	291	289	291	292	290	289	1742	62	
	Vladimir Issachenko	96	96	95	97	95	97	576	22	
	Vyacheslav Podlesniy	97	97	98	97	96	95	580	17	
	Rashid Yunusmetov	98	96	98	98	99	97	586	23	
5	Vietnam (VIE)	290	286	289	284	290	293	1732	52	
	Hoàng Xuân Vinh	97	98	96	96	98	98	583	13	
	Nguyễn Hoàng Phương	95	92	97	92	95	98	569	16	
	Trần Quốc Cường	98	96	96	96	97	97	580	23	
6	Japan (JPN)	289	290	292	282	290	285	1728	51	
	Kojiro Horimizu	95	98	99	93	96	97	578	14	
	Tomoyuki Matsuda	99	99	96	96	97	92	579	21	
	Masaru Nakashige	95	93	97	93	97	96	571	16	
7	Singapore (SIN)	285	285	284	284	288	289	1715	37	
	Gai Bin	95	95	97	97	94	98	576	16	
	Lim Swee Hon	96	94	93	91	98	95	567	9	
	Poh Lip Meng	94	96	94	96	96	96	572	12	
8	Thailand (THA)	280	284	288	283	288	285	1708	44	
	Jettakan Chokkaeo	90	96	97	95	98	96	572	18	
	Kasem Khamhaeng	97	94	96	94	95	95	571	16	
	Tarasatid Varidputimate	93	94	95	94	95	94	565	10	
9	Malaysia (MAS)	286	284	284	286	291	275	1706	46	
	Eddy Chew	94	95	93	95	96	92	565	14	
	Choo Wen Yan	95	95	96	93	99	89	567	14	
	Johnathan Wong	97	94	95	98	96	94	574	18	
10	Iran (IRI)	285	284	282	289	286	280	1706	44	
	Mohammad Ahmadi	97	95	92	96	96	93	569	12	
	Ebrahim Barkhordari	96	94	94	97	92	96	569	15	
	Ebrahim Rahimi	92	95	96	96	98	91	568	17	
11	Saudi Arabia (KSA)	283	279	276	287	284	284	1693	29	
	Atallah Al-Anazi	96	93	93	97	96	93	568	10	
	Aqeel Al-Badrani	94	93	91	95	94	96	563	8	
	Safar Al-Dosari	93	93	92	95	94	95	562	11	
12	Mongolia (MGL)	273	283	290	279	288	278	1691	35	
	Altanbaganyn Altankhuyag	92	94	97	94	95	91	563	6	
	Enkhtaivany Davaakhüü	94	95	98	95	99	98	579	18	
	Baljinnyamyn Sainnasan	87	94	95	90	94	89	549	11	
13	Kuwait (KUW)	282	279	281	276	282	285	1685	32	
	Ali Al-Mutairi	91	93	93	89	93	94	553	5	
	Hamad Al-Namshan	98	94	95	97	96	95	575	18	
	Medaith Al-Sahli	93	92	93	90	93	96	557	9	
14	Macau (MAC)	282	279	281	276	282	285	1685	32	
	Che Seak Hong	93	95	91	92	92	91	554	6	
	Lok Chan Tou	89	94	92	93	93	95	556	9	
	Lou U Seng	84	88	89	91	92	88	532	4	
15	Tajikistan (TJK)	282	279	281	276	282	285	1685	32	
	Nurmukhammad Arutyunyan	89	89	91	85	88	91	533	9	
	Eradzhbek Kuchkarov	90	91	92	91	87	90	541	6	
	Dzhafar Shermatov	89	90	92	89	94	91	545	8	
—	Qatar (QAT)							DNS		
	Khalid Rashid Al-Muhannadi							DNS		
	Oleg Engachev	95	95	97	95	96	99	577	14	
	Azizjon Mukhamedrakhimov	94	94	93	93	94	94	562	16	
