= Shooting at the 2014 Asian Games – Men's 50 metre pistol =

Men's 50 metre pistol at the 2014 Asian Games
- Venue: Ongnyeon International Shooting Range
- Dates: 20 September 2014
- Competitors: 48 from 19 nations

Medalists
gold medal	Jitu Rai	India
silver medal	Nguyễn Hoàng Phương	Vietnam
bronze medal	Wang Zhiwei	China

The men's 50 metre pistol competition at the 2014 Asian Games in Incheon, South Korea was held on 20 September at the Ongnyeon International Shooting Range.

== Schedule ==
All times are Korea Standard Time (UTC+09:00)

Date	Time	Event
Saturday, 20 September 2014	09:30	Qualification
Saturday, 20 September 2014	12:15	Final

== Records ==
Prior to this competition, the existing world, Asian and Games records were as follows.

Qualification
World Record	Jin Jong-oh (KOR)	583	Granada, Spain	9 September 2014
Asian Record	Jin Jong-oh (KOR)	583	Granada, Spain	9 September 2014
Games Record	Wang Yifu (CHN)	571	Busan, South Korea	2 October 2002
Final
World Record	Jin Jong-oh (KOR)	200.7	Granada, Spain	7 July 2013
Asian Record	Jin Jong-oh (KOR)	200.7	Granada, Spain	7 July 2013
Games Record	—	—	—	—

== Results ==
Legend

- DNS — Did not start

=== Qualification ===
Rank	Athlete	Series						Total	Xs	Notes
Rank	Athlete	1	2	3	4	5	6	Total	Xs	Notes
1	Jin Jong-oh (KOR)	94	96	94	95	94	95	568	13	
2	Hoàng Xuân Vinh (VIE)	92	96	96	97	97	90	568	11	
3	Pang Wei (CHN)	95	96	89	97	94	96	567	14	
4	Pu Qifeng (CHN)	92	94	95	92	97	94	564	19	
5	Wang Zhiwei (CHN)	94	96	91	97	91	92	561	9	
6	Lim Swee Hon (SIN)	92	95	94	92	95	91	559	15	
7	Jitu Rai (IND)	92	97	92	93	92	93	559	13	
8	Nguyễn Hoàng Phương (VIE)	94	93	88	95	94	93	557	5	
9	Tomoyuki Matsuda (JPN)	90	93	94	93	94	91	555	9	
10	Om Prakash (IND)	91	92	93	92	95	92	555	8	
11	Mohammad Ahmadi (IRI)	87	92	95	89	94	96	553	11	
12	Vladimir Issachenko (KAZ)	94	92	89	94	95	89	553	9	
13	Poh Lip Meng (SIN)	92	94	94	90	93	90	553	8	
14	Lee Dae-myung (KOR)	88	89	94	92	95	95	553	7	
15	Aqeel Al-Badrani (KSA)	94	89	89	93	97	90	552	12	
16	Omkar Singh (IND)	89	97	91	93	92	89	551	6	
17	Enkhtaivany Davaakhüü (MGL)	91	93	90	93	91	92	550	13	
18	Johnathan Wong (MAS)	94	89	91	92	93	91	550	8	
19	Ebrahim Barkhordari (IRI)	89	89	93	92	94	93	550	5	
20	Choi Young-rae (KOR)	90	92	91	92	93	91	549	11	
21	Atallah Al-Anazi (KSA)	93	93	92	92	88	91	549	9	
22	Kasem Khamhaeng (THA)	92	92	90	89	90	94	547	6	
23	Abdulmajed Abdulkhaliq (BRN)	84	92	94	92	96	87	545	10	
24	Trần Quốc Cường (VIE)	93	93	90	92	93	84	545	9	
25	Gai Bin (SIN)	92	87	93	92	91	89	544	8	
26	Oleg Engachev (QAT)	91	85	91	95	91	91	544	7	
27	Kojiro Horimizu (JPN)	86	90	94	95	89	90	544	5	
28	Vyacheslav Podlesniy (KAZ)	91	85	93	95	92	87	543	6	
29	Masaru Nakashige (JPN)	92	88	91	88	95	89	543	3	
30	Kanitpong Gongkum (THA)	91	91	90	87	92	91	542	7	
31	Rashid Yunusmetov (KAZ)	86	89	89	95	93	90	542	5	
32	Kalim Ullah Khan (PAK)	90	91	91	91	88	89	540	5	
33	Ye Tun Naung (MYA)	94	82	92	91	87	92	538	5	
34	Lok Chan Tou (MAC)	91	84	92	89	91	91	538	4	
35	Adisak Saleenosak (THA)	87	93	92	91	87	88	538	4	
36	Ebrahim Rahimi (IRI)	84	91	91	88	92	91	537	5	
37	Hamad Al-Namshan (KUW)	91	90	88	85	88	94	536	6	
38	Che Seak Hong (MAC)	85	93	88	88	93	86	533	6	
39	Eddy Chew (MAS)	90	92	91	87	84	85	529	8	
40	Uzair Ahmed (PAK)	90	87	88	88	83	93	529	5	
41	Jamal Al-Hattali (OMA)	89	89	91	90	75	93	527	4	
42	Altanbaganyn Altankhuyag (MGL)	84	90	85	91	93	84	527	4	
43	Choo Wen Yan (MAS)	85	82	92	90	89	88	526	11	
44	Mohammed Al-Amri (KSA)	87	87	89	87	88	83	521	4	
45	Ali Al-Mutairi (KUW)	88	89	88	84	81	86	516	4	
46	Medaith Al-Sahli (KUW)	84	82	87	89	89	82	513	2	
47	Baljinnyamyn Sainnasan (MGL)	72	70	89	81	85	86	483	1	
—	Saeed Abusharib (QAT)							DNS		

=== Final ===
Rank	Athlete	1st stage		2nd stage – Elimination							S-off	Notes
Rank	Athlete	1	2	1	2	3	4	5	6	7	S-off	Notes
1st place, gold medalist(s)	Jitu Rai (IND)	28.7	56.3	73.8	94.3	113.3	131.0	151.6	168.2	186.2		GR
2nd place, silver medalist(s)	Nguyễn Hoàng Phương (VIE)	29.0	57.9	77.1	94.3	112.2	131.5	151.7	168.9	183.4		
3rd place, bronze medalist(s)	Wang Zhiwei (CHN)	27.0	55.8	74.6	93.2	110.3	129.5	147.2	165.6			
4	Hoàng Xuân Vinh (VIE)	29.7	59.0	77.4	95.1	111.3	129.7	145.9				
5	Pang Wei (CHN)	31.1	55.6	77.0	96.2	112.2	128.8					
6	Lim Swee Hon (SIN)	28.1	58.8	76.9	94.5	109.4						
7	Jin Jong-oh (KOR)	26.6	54.2	73.3	92.1							
8	Pu Qifeng (CHN)	24.5	53.1	72.1								
