= Shooting at the 2010 Asian Games – Men's 50 metre pistol =

Men's 50 metre pistol at the 2010 Asian Games
- Venue: Aoti Shooting Range
- Dates: 13 November 2010
- Competitors: 44 from 17 nations

Medalists
gold medal	Pu Qifeng	China
silver medal	Jin Jong-oh	South Korea
bronze medal	Tomoyuki Matsuda	Japan

The men's 50 metre pistol competition at the 2010 Asian Games in Guangzhou, China was held on 13 November at the Aoti Shooting Range.

== Schedule ==
All times are China Standard Time (UTC+08:00)

Date	Time	Event
Saturday, 13 November 2010	09:00	Qualification
Saturday, 13 November 2010	13:00	Final

== Records ==
Prior to this competition, the existing world, Asian and Games records were as follows.

Qualification
World Record	Aleksandr Melentyev (URS)	581	Moscow, Soviet Union	20 July 1980
Asian Record	Tan Zongliang (CHN)	577	Zagreb, Croatia	24 July 2006
Games Record	Wang Yifu (CHN)	571	Busan, South Korea	2 October 2002
Final
World Record	William Demarest (USA)	676.2	Milan, Italy	4 June 2000
Asian Record	Jin Jong-oh (KOR)	674.6	Changwon, South Korea	11 April 2009
Games Record	Masaru Nakashige (JPN)	664.1	Hiroshima, Japan	7 October 1994

== Results ==
Legend

- DNS — Did not start

=== Qualification ===
Rank	Athlete	Series						Total	Xs	S-off	Notes
Rank	Athlete	1	2	3	4	5	6	Total	Xs	S-off	Notes
1	Jin Jong-oh (KOR)	93	95	94	93	96	95	566	12		
2	Pu Qifeng (CHN)	94	95	92	94	97	93	565	8		
3	Lee Sang-do (KOR)	94	92	91	96	91	96	560	9		
4	Pang Wei (CHN)	91	96	95	94	94	88	558	9		
5	Omkar Singh (IND)	94	92	95	94	91	91	557	12		
6	Vladimir Issachenko (KAZ)	96	94	94	93	89	91	557	7		
7	Kojiro Horimizu (JPN)	92	95	94	96	91	88	556	12		
8	Tomoyuki Matsuda (JPN)	91	93	95	93	93	91	556	4		
9	Susumu Kobayashi (JPN)	90	90	91	97	98	89	555	9		
10	Trần Quốc Cường (VIE)	90	96	89	93	94	93	555	6		
11	Lee Dae-myung (KOR)	90	94	93	90	95	91	553	9		
12	Poh Lip Meng (SIN)	93	94	89	92	91	94	553	6		
13	Kim Jong-su (PRK)	95	87	92	97	89	92	552	14		
14	Mohammed Al-Saeed (KSA)	96	90	90	91	94	90	551	6		
15	Rashid Yunusmetov (KAZ)	90	92	93	88	93	94	550	9		
16	Amanpreet Singh (IND)	92	89	92	94	93	90	550	9		
17	Nguyễn Mạnh Tường (VIE)	88	91	91	89	94	95	548	6		
18	Wu Jing (CHN)	90	94	90	94	90	90	548	5		
19	Ryu Myong-yon (PRK)	92	97	94	88	87	88	546	6		
20	Hoàng Xuân Vinh (VIE)	92	89	90	91	90	93	545	7		
21	Kasem Khamhaeng (THA)	94	91	90	89	90	91	545	7		
22	Enkhtaivany Davaakhüü (MGL)	88	89	90	90	92	96	545	4		
23	Mohsen Nasr Esfahani (IRI)	86	90	91	91	90	96	544	9		
24	Ebrahim Barkhordari (IRI)	90	89	93	92	86	94	544	7		
25	Lim Swee Hon (SIN)	93	83	91	89	94	92	542	6		
26	Edirisinghe Senanayake (SRI)	90	87	94	93	91	86	541	9		
27	Gai Bin (SIN)	94	91	83	92	92	88	540	6		
28	Deepak Sharma (IND)	94	88	91	89	91	86	539	8		
29	Vyacheslav Podlesniy (KAZ)	95	90	94	83	84	93	539	6		
30	Kaleem Ullah (PAK)	90	88	94	89	88	90	539	2		
31	Noppadon Sutiviruch (THA)	87	87	88	86	95	95	538	6		
32	Kwon Tong-hyok (PRK)	86	89	89	94	88	92	538	5		
33	Mohammad Ahmadi (IRI)	88	88	94	89	93	85	537	5		
34	Sergey Babikov (TJK)	87	90	90	91	89	87	534	5		
35	Enkhtaivany Badamgarav (MGL)	88	92	82	86	92	93	533	10		
36	Pruet Sriyaphan (THA)	89	87	88	88	90	90	532	11		
37	Kalim Ullah Khan (PAK)	86	89	95	90	85	86	531	5		
38	Aqeel Al-Badrani (KSA)	85	88	89	86	89	93	530	4		
39	Ashban Sulaiman (BRN)	87	87	89	89	87	88	527	5		
40	Khalid Ahmed Mohamed (BRN)	93	85	87	87	89	84	525	5		
41	Md Nadimul Islam (BAN)	87	82	88	94	89	83	523	6		
42	Vashliin Gantsooj (MGL)	88	89	89	82	90	83	521	6		
43	Mohammed Al-Amri (KSA)	86	81	90	80	86	91	514	4		
—	Georgy Bagdasarov (TJK)							DNS			

=== Final ===
Rank	Athlete	Qual.	Final											Total	S-off	Notes
Rank	Athlete	Qual.	1	2	3	4	5	6	7	8	9	10	Total	Total	S-off	Notes
1st place, gold medalist(s)	Pu Qifeng (CHN)	565	10.4	10.3	9.7	9.4	9.8	8.4	8.9	10.6	9.5	9.5	96.5	661.5		
2nd place, silver medalist(s)	Jin Jong-oh (KOR)	566	10.0	8.2	9.7	10.2	8.8	9.7	9.7	10.0	7.7	9.5	93.5	659.5		
3rd place, bronze medalist(s)	Tomoyuki Matsuda (JPN)	556	9.9	10.2	9.2	9.9	9.2	10.2	10.2	9.5	9.5	9.9	97.7	653.7		
4	Lee Sang-do (KOR)	560	9.8	5.9	9.9	8.2	9.7	9.4	9.6	9.2	9.6	9.8	91.1	651.1		
5	Pang Wei (CHN)	558	10.0	9.4	9.7	10.1	9.6	9.1	8.3	8.7	7.7	10.4	93.0	651.0		
6	Kojiro Horimizu (JPN)	556	8.8	9.4	8.5	9.2	10.7	10.2	10.3	9.5	8.8	8.2	93.6	649.6		
7	Omkar Singh (IND)	557	8.1	9.6	9.8	8.9	9.1	9.8	9.4	8.0	8.8	9.7	91.2	648.2		
8	Vladimir Issachenko (KAZ)	557	9.5	8.0	9.9	10.3	8.8	8.6	8.6	8.7	10.1	8.6	91.1	648.1		
