= Shooting at the 2010 Asian Games – Men's 50 metre pistol team =

Men's 50 metre pistol team at the 2010 Asian Games
- Venue: Aoti Shooting Range
- Dates: 13 November 2010
- Competitors: 36 from 12 nations

Medalists
gold medal	South Korea; Jin Jong-oh, Lee Dae-myung, Lee Sang-do
silver medal	China; Pang Wei, Pu Qifeng, Wu Jing
bronze medal	Japan; Kojiro Horimizu, Susumu Kobayashi, Tomoyuki Matsuda

The men's 50 metre pistol team competition at the 2010 Asian Games in Guangzhou, China was held on 13 November at the Aoti Shooting Range.

== Schedule ==
All times are China Standard Time (UTC+08:00)

Date	Time	Event
Saturday, 13 November 2010	09:00	Final

== Records ==
Prior to this competition, the existing world, Asian and Games records were as follows.

World Record	Romania	1719	Osijek, Yugoslavia	7 September 1985
Asian Record	China	1699	Lahti, Finland	8 July 2002
Games Record	China	1690	Busan, South Korea	2 October 2002

== Results ==
Rank	Team	Series						Total	Xs	Notes
Rank	Team	1	2	3	4	5	6	Total	Xs	Notes
1st place, gold medalist(s)	South Korea (KOR)	277	281	278	279	282	282	1679	30	
	Jin Jong-oh	93	95	94	93	96	95	566	12	
	Lee Dae-myung	90	94	93	90	95	91	553	9	
	Lee Sang-do	94	92	91	96	91	96	560	9	
2nd place, silver medalist(s)	China (CHN)	275	285	277	282	281	271	1671	22	
	Pang Wei	91	96	95	94	94	88	558	9	
	Pu Qifeng	94	95	92	94	97	93	565	8	
	Wu Jing	90	94	90	94	90	90	548	5	
3rd place, bronze medalist(s)	Japan (JPN)	273	278	280	286	282	268	1667	25	
	Kojiro Horimizu	92	95	94	96	91	88	556	12	
	Susumu Kobayashi	90	90	91	97	98	89	555	9	
	Tomoyuki Matsuda	91	93	95	93	93	91	556	4	
4	Vietnam (VIE)	270	276	270	273	278	281	1648	19	
	Hoàng Xuân Vinh	92	89	90	91	90	93	545	7	
	Nguyễn Mạnh Tường	88	91	91	89	94	95	548	6	
	Trần Quốc Cường	90	96	89	93	94	93	555	6	
5	India (IND)	280	269	278	277	275	267	1646	29	
	Deepak Sharma	94	88	91	89	91	86	539	8	
	Amanpreet Singh	92	89	92	94	93	90	550	9	
	Omkar Singh	94	92	95	94	91	91	557	12	
6	Kazakhstan (KAZ)	281	276	281	264	266	278	1646	22	
	Vladimir Issachenko	96	94	94	93	89	91	557	7	
	Vyacheslav Podlesniy	95	90	94	83	84	93	539	6	
	Rashid Yunusmetov	90	92	93	88	93	94	550	9	
7	North Korea (PRK)	273	273	275	279	264	272	1636	25	
	Kim Jong-su	95	87	92	97	89	92	552	14	
	Kwon Tong-hyok	86	89	89	94	88	92	538	5	
	Ryu Myong-yon	92	97	94	88	87	88	546	6	
8	Singapore (SIN)	280	268	263	273	277	274	1635	18	
	Gai Bin	94	91	83	92	92	88	540	6	
	Lim Swee Hon	93	83	91	89	94	92	542	6	
	Poh Lip Meng	93	94	89	92	91	94	553	6	
9	Iran (IRI)	264	267	278	272	269	275	1625	21	
	Mohammad Ahmadi	88	88	94	89	93	85	537	5	
	Ebrahim Barkhordari	90	89	93	92	86	94	544	7	
	Mohsen Nasr Esfahani	86	90	91	91	90	96	544	9	
10	Thailand (THA)	270	265	266	263	275	276	1615	24	
	Kasem Khamhaeng	94	91	90	89	90	91	545	7	
	Pruet Sriyaphan	89	87	88	88	90	90	532	11	
	Noppadon Sutiviruch	87	87	88	86	95	95	538	6	
11	Mongolia (MGL)	264	270	261	258	274	272	1599	20	
	Enkhtaivany Badamgarav	88	92	82	86	92	93	533	10	
	Enkhtaivany Davaakhüü	88	89	90	90	92	96	545	4	
	Vashliin Gantsooj	88	89	89	82	90	83	521	6	
12	Saudi Arabia (KSA)	267	259	269	257	269	274	1595	14	
	Mohammed Al-Amri	86	81	90	80	86	91	514	4	
	Aqeel Al-Badrani	85	88	89	86	89	93	530	4	
	Mohammed Al-Saeed	96	90	90	91	94	90	551	6	
