= Shooting at the 2010 Asian Games – Men's 10 metre air pistol =

Men's 10 metre air pistol at the 2010 Asian Games
- Venue: Aoti Shooting Range
- Dates: 14 November 2010
- Competitors: 51 from 21 nations

Medalists
gold medal	Lee Dae-myung	South Korea
silver medal	Tan Zongliang	China
bronze medal	Vijay Kumar	India

The men's 10 metre air pistol competition at the 2010 Asian Games in Guangzhou, China was held on 14 November at the Aoti Shooting Range.

== Schedule ==
All times are China Standard Time (UTC+08:00)

Date	Time	Event
Sunday, 14 November 2010	09:00	Qualification
Sunday, 14 November 2010	12:00	Final

== Records ==
Prior to this competition, the existing world, Asian and Games records were as follows.

Qualification
World Record	Jin Jong-oh (KOR)	594	Changwon, South Korea	12 April 2009
Asian Record	Jin Jong-oh (KOR)	594	Changwon, South Korea	12 April 2009
Games Record	Tan Zongliang (CHN)	590	Busan, South Korea	3 October 2002
Final
World Record	Sergey Pyzhyanov (URS)	695.1	Munich, West Germany	13 October 1989
Asian Record	Tan Zongliang (CHN)	691.2	Munich, Germany	15 June 2003
Games Record	Tan Zongliang (CHN)	690.3	Busan, South Korea	3 October 2002

== Results ==
Legend

- DSQ — Disqualified

=== Qualification ===
Rank	Athlete	Series						Total	Xs	S-off	Notes
Rank	Athlete	1	2	3	4	5	6	Total	Xs	S-off	Notes
1	Tan Zongliang (CHN)	96	96	97	100	99	97	585	21		
2	Lee Dae-myung (KOR)	99	99	97	97	96	97	585	21		
3	Kim Jong-su (PRK)	96	98	98	97	95	97	581	25		
4	Jin Jong-oh (KOR)	95	94	97	98	98	99	581	21		
5	Lee Sang-do (KOR)	95	97	98	95	97	98	580	21		
6	Wong Fai (HKG)	98	96	96	97	97	96	580	21		
7	Pu Qifeng (CHN)	94	97	97	96	99	97	580	16		
8	Vijay Kumar (IND)	97	98	98	96	97	93	579	18		
9	Pang Wei (CHN)	96	98	95	96	97	96	578	22		
10	Hoàng Xuân Vinh (VIE)	96	97	96	96	96	97	578	19		
11	Ebrahim Barkhordari (IRI)	94	97	98	95	97	97	578	17		
12	Ryu Myong-yon (PRK)	95	97	97	97	97	94	577	21		
13	Tomoyuki Matsuda (JPN)	95	96	97	94	97	98	577	20		
14	Vyacheslav Podlesniy (KAZ)	96	99	94	93	98	97	577	18		
15	Gai Bin (SIN)	97	96	98	96	94	96	577	13		
16	Kojiro Horimizu (JPN)	94	95	99	98	95	94	575	19		
17	Trần Quốc Cường (VIE)	96	96	97	92	98	95	574	18		
18	Enkhtaivany Davaakhüü (MGL)	91	99	96	98	94	96	574	17		
19	Pongpol Kulchairattana (THA)	95	98	97	95	92	97	574	16		
20	Gurpreet Singh (IND)	96	92	95	98	97	95	573	15		
21	Noppadon Sutiviruch (THA)	91	92	95	98	97	99	572	20		
22	Susumu Kobayashi (JPN)	96	95	96	93	94	98	572	15		
23	Vladimir Issachenko (KAZ)	96	94	94	95	95	97	571	19		
24	Che Seak Hong (MAC)	95	94	98	95	93	96	571	17		
25	Poh Lip Meng (SIN)	98	97	97	91	94	93	570	12		
26	Sergey Babikov (TJK)	93	95	98	94	95	94	569	12		
27	Enkhtaivany Badamgarav (MGL)	97	97	92	91	96	95	568	18		
28	Omkar Singh (IND)	95	92	97	96	95	93	568	14		
29	Vashliin Gantsooj (MGL)	95	95	98	95	91	92	566	20		
30	Mohammad Ahmadi (IRI)	97	95	94	91	93	96	566	14		
31	Ashban Sulaiman (BRN)	93	93	97	96	93	94	566	12		
32	Aqeel Al-Badrani (KSA)	96	92	92	96	95	94	565	8		
33	Saeed Al-Ghamdi (KSA)	95	93	93	93	93	97	564	16		
34	Rashid Yunusmetov (KAZ)	95	94	93	92	96	93	563	16		
35	Edirisinghe Senanayake (SRI)	94	92	96	94	91	96	563	14		
36	Kalim Ullah Khan (PAK)	95	95	94	94	93	92	563	13		
37	Kaleem Ullah (PAK)	93	92	95	91	98	93	562	17		
38	Lim Swee Hon (SIN)	96	91	93	91	96	94	561	12		
39	Nguyễn Mạnh Tường (VIE)	96	94	93	90	96	92	561	12		
40	Georgy Bagdasarov (TJK)	93	94	96	93	93	92	561	7		
41	Safar Al-Dosari (KSA)	96	91	93	92	94	94	560	10		
42	Md Nadimul Islam (BAN)	93	90	92	95	91	96	557	9		
43	Wirat Amphalop (THA)	94	93	91	91	94	94	557	7		
44	Md Iqbal Hossain (BAN)	92	89	92	95	92	95	555	7		
45	Mark Mañosca (PHI)	93	91	96	93	89	89	551	12		
46	Khalid Ahmed Mohamed (BRN)	91	89	91	94	92	94	551	8		
47	Lok Chan Tou (MAC)	91	93	89	92	95	90	550	8		
48	Mohsen Nasr Esfahani (IRI)	86	93	91	93	93	91	547	8		
49	Vladimir Manzyuk (TJK)	89	87	83	83	88	82	512	3		
50	Sayed Jawid Athar (AFG)	86	81	84	84	84	87	506	4		
—	Kwon Tong-hyok (PRK)							DSQ			

=== Final ===
Rank	Athlete	Qual.	Final											Total	S-off	Notes
Rank	Athlete	Qual.	1	2	3	4	5	6	7	8	9	10	Total	Total	S-off	Notes
1st place, gold medalist(s)	Lee Dae-myung (KOR)	585	7.9	9.9	10.3	10.2	10.3	10.5	10.5	10.8	10.1	10.3	100.8	685.8		
2nd place, silver medalist(s)	Tan Zongliang (CHN)	585	9.9	9.9	9.6	10.0	9.6	9.5	10.6	9.8	10.0	10.6	99.5	684.5		
3rd place, bronze medalist(s)	Vijay Kumar (IND)	579	10.7	10.6	10.0	9.3	10.1	10.6	9.8	10.7	10.0	9.6	101.4	680.4		
4	Kim Jong-su (PRK)	581	9.9	8.8	10.3	9.9	10.5	9.3	9.7	10.4	9.6	10.2	98.6	679.6		
5	Lee Sang-do (KOR)	580	9.9	8.7	9.8	9.4	10.5	10.1	10.4	9.5	10.1	10.4	98.8	678.8		
6	Jin Jong-oh (KOR)	581	8.9	9.6	10.7	9.5	9.7	10.1	10.0	9.3	10.1	9.8	97.7	678.7		
7	Wong Fai (HKG)	580	10.3	10.2	10.4	10.3	9.5	9.6	10.6	9.2	9.1	8.9	98.1	678.1		
8	Pu Qifeng (CHN)	580	8.7	10.3	9.7	10.6	9.9	9.9	10.3	9.7	9.9	8.7	97.7	677.7		
