= Shooting at the 2010 Asian Games – Men's 10 metre air pistol team =

Men's 10 metre air pistol team at the 2010 Asian Games
- Venue: Aoti Shooting Range
- Dates: 14 November 2010
- Competitors: 39 from 13 nations

Medalists
gold medal	South Korea; Jin Jong-oh, Lee Dae-myung, Lee Sang-do
silver medal	China; Pang Wei, Pu Qifeng, Tan Zongliang
bronze medal	Japan; Kojiro Horimizu, Susumu Kobayashi, Tomoyuki Matsuda

The men's 10 metre air pistol team competition at the 2010 Asian Games in Guangzhou, China was held on 14 November at the Aoti Shooting Range.

== Schedule ==
All times are China Standard Time (UTC+08:00)

Date	Time	Event
Sunday, 14 November 2010	09:00	Final

== Records ==
Prior to this competition, the existing world, Asian and Games records were as follows.

World Record	Russia	1759	Deauville, France	16 March 2007
Asian Record	China	1756	Langkawi, Malaysia	27 January 2000
Games Record	China	1750	Busan, South Korea	3 October 2002

== Results ==
Legend

- DSQ — Disqualified

Rank	Team	Series						Total	Xs	Notes
Rank	Team	1	2	3	4	5	6	Total	Xs	Notes
1st place, gold medalist(s)	South Korea (KOR)	289	290	292	290	291	294	1746	63	
	Jin Jong-oh	95	94	97	98	98	99	581	21	
	Lee Dae-myung	99	99	97	97	96	97	585	21	
	Lee Sang-do	95	97	98	95	97	98	580	21	
2nd place, silver medalist(s)	China (CHN)	286	291	289	292	295	290	1743	59	
	Pang Wei	96	98	95	96	97	96	578	22	
	Pu Qifeng	94	97	97	96	99	97	580	16	
	Tan Zongliang	96	96	97	100	99	97	585	21	
3rd place, bronze medalist(s)	Japan (JPN)	285	286	292	285	286	290	1724	54	
	Kojiro Horimizu	94	95	99	98	95	94	575	19	
	Susumu Kobayashi	96	95	96	93	94	98	572	15	
	Tomoyuki Matsuda	95	96	97	94	97	98	577	20	
4	India (IND)	288	282	290	290	289	281	1720	47	
	Vijay Kumar	97	98	98	96	97	93	579	18	
	Gurpreet Singh	96	92	95	98	97	95	573	15	
	Omkar Singh	95	92	97	96	95	93	568	14	
5	Vietnam (VIE)	288	287	286	278	290	284	1713	49	
	Hoàng Xuân Vinh	96	97	96	96	96	97	578	19	
	Nguyễn Mạnh Tường	96	94	93	90	96	92	561	12	
	Trần Quốc Cường	96	96	97	92	98	95	574	18	
6	Kazakhstan (KAZ)	287	287	281	280	289	287	1711	53	
	Vladimir Issachenko	96	94	94	95	95	97	571	19	
	Vyacheslav Podlesniy	96	99	94	93	98	97	577	18	
	Rashid Yunusmetov	95	94	93	92	96	93	563	16	
7	Mongolia (MGL)	283	291	286	284	281	283	1708	55	
	Enkhtaivany Badamgarav	97	97	92	91	96	95	568	18	
	Enkhtaivany Davaakhüü	91	99	96	98	94	96	574	17	
	Vashliin Gantsooj	95	95	98	95	91	92	566	20	
8	Singapore (SIN)	291	284	288	278	284	283	1708	37	
	Gai Bin	97	96	98	96	94	96	577	13	
	Lim Swee Hon	96	91	93	91	96	94	561	12	
	Poh Lip Meng	98	97	97	91	94	93	570	12	
9	Thailand (THA)	280	283	283	284	283	290	1703	43	
	Wirat Amphalop	94	93	91	91	94	94	557	7	
	Pongpol Kulchairattana	95	98	97	95	92	97	574	16	
	Noppadon Sutiviruch	91	92	95	98	97	99	572	20	
10	Iran (IRI)	277	285	283	279	283	284	1691	39	
	Mohammad Ahmadi	97	95	94	91	93	96	566	14	
	Ebrahim Barkhordari	94	97	98	95	97	97	578	17	
	Mohsen Nasr Esfahani	86	93	91	93	93	91	547	8	
11	Saudi Arabia (KSA)	287	276	278	281	282	285	1689	34	
	Aqeel Al-Badrani	96	92	92	96	95	94	565	8	
	Safar Al-Dosari	96	91	93	92	94	94	560	10	
	Saeed Al-Ghamdi	95	93	93	93	93	97	564	16	
12	Tajikistan (TJK)	275	276	277	270	276	268	1642	22	
	Sergey Babikov	93	95	98	94	95	94	569	12	
	Georgy Bagdasarov	93	94	96	93	93	92	561	7	
	Vladimir Manzyuk	89	87	83	83	88	82	512	3	
—	North Korea (PRK)							DSQ		
	Kim Jong-su	96	98	98	97	95	97	581	25	
	Kwon Tong-hyok							DSQ		
	Ryu Myong-yon	95	97	97	97	97	94	577	21	
