= Shooting at the 2016 Summer Olympics – Men's 10 metre air pistol =

Men's 10 metre air pistol at the Games of the XXXI Olympiad
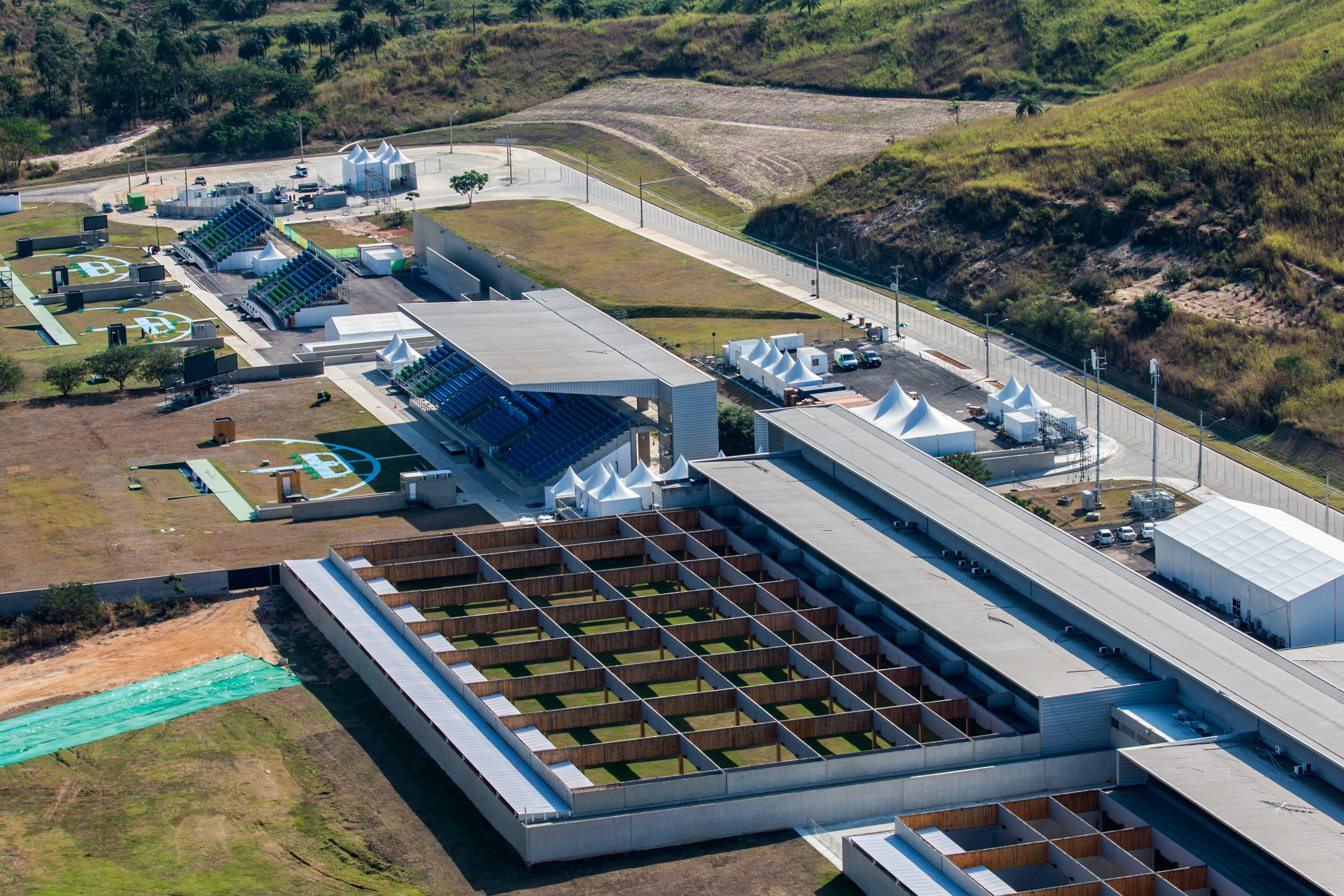
- Aerial view of the National Shooting Center in Deodoro, where the Men's 10 metre air pistol took place.
- Venue: National Shooting Center
- Date: 6 August 2016
- Competitors: 46 from 35 nations
- Winning score: 202.5 OR

Medalists
1st place, gold medalist(s)		Hoàng Xuân Vinh	Vietnam
2nd place, silver medalist(s)		Felipe Almeida Wu	Brazil
3rd place, bronze medalist(s)		Pang Wei	China

The men's 10 metre air pistol event at the 2016 Summer Olympics took place on 6 August 2016 at the National Shooting Center.

The event consisted of two rounds: a qualification and a final. In the qualification round, each shooter fired 60 shots with an air pistol at 10 metres distance. Scores for each shot were in increments of 1, with a maximum score of 10. The top-eight shooters in the qualification round advanced to the final round, where they fired an additional 20 shots. Scores for each shot were in increments of 0.1, with a maximum score of 10.9.

Vietnamese shooter Hoàng Xuân Vinh set an Olympic record based on ISSF Rule changed on 1 January 2013 in the final round with a score of 202.5 (again, an Olympic record), winning the first-ever gold medal for his country in the history of the Olympic Games.

The medals were presented by Mamadou Diagna Ndiaye, IOC member, Senegal and Franz Schreiber, Secretary General of the International Shooting Sport Federation.

== Records ==
Prior to this competition, the existing world and Olympic records were as follows:

Qualification records
World record	Jin Jong-oh (KOR)	594	Changwon, Korea	12 April 2009
Olympic record	Mikhail Nestruev (RUS)	591	Athens, Greece	14 August 2004

Final records
World record	Jin Jong-oh (KOR)	206.0	Changwon, South Korea	12 April 2009
Olympic record	ISSF Rule changed on 01.01.2013	–	–	–

The following records were established during the competition:

Date	Event	Name	Nation	Mark	Record
6 August	Final	Hoàng Xuân Vinh	Vietnam	202.5	OR

== Qualification round ==
Rank	Athlete	Country	1	2	3	4	5	6	Total	Inner 10s	Notes
1	Pang Wei	China	97	98	99	98	99	99	590	27	Q
2	Jin Jong-oh	South Korea	97	94	98	100	96	99	584	24	Q
3	Juraj Tužinský	Slovakia	96	97	98	97	98	96	582	23	Q
4	Hoàng Xuân Vinh	Vietnam	96	97	98	97	98	95	581	18	Q
5	Giuseppe Giordano	Italy	97	95	98	95	98	97	580	24	Q
6	Jitu Rai	India	96	96	98	96	96	98	580	22	Q
7	Felipe Almeida Wu	Brazil	96	95	99	97	97	96	580	19	Q
8	Vladimir Gontcharov	Russia	96	96	99	98	94	97	580	17	Q
9	Dimitrije Grgić	Serbia	96	96	97	97	96	97	579	20	
10	Pablo Carrera	Spain	98	95	93	97	98	98	579	18	
11	João Costa	Portugal	98	97	96	96	94	97	578	21	
12	Will Brown	United States	95	98	97	95	96	96	577	23	
13	Júlio Almeida	Brazil	97	94	96	97	96	97	577	20	
14	Oleh Omelchuk	Ukraine	96	98	96	99	94	94	577	20	
15	Ruslan Lunev	Azerbaijan	96	94	95	97	96	99	577	19	
16	Pu Qifeng	China	97	97	94	95	98	96	577	19	
17	Kim Song-guk	North Korea	98	95	97	95	97	95	577	18	
18	Jay Shi	United States	97	95	95	98	97	95	577	17	
19	Lee Dae-myung	South Korea	98	96	95	95	97	96	577	12	
20	Gurpreet Singh	India	94	96	93	99	99	95	576	21	
21	Yusuf Dikeç	Turkey	95	93	97	98	98	95	576	17	
22	Tomoyuki Matsuda	Japan	92	95	96	98	97	98	576	14	
23	Vladimir Issachenko	Kazakhstan	94	97	96	98	95	95	579	19	
24	İsmail Keleş	Turkey	99	93	93	98	94	98	575	18	
25	Damir Mikec	Serbia	98	97	95	97	92	96	575	18	
26	Trần Quốc Cường	Vietnam	95	98	96	96	97	93	575	16	
27	Kim Jong-su	North Korea	95	95	95	96	96	98	575	15	
28	Johnathan Wong	Malaysia	94	96	96	98	93	97	574	17	
29	Tsotne Machavariani	Georgia	96	97	95	97	95	94	574	16	
30	Samy Abdel Razek	Egypt	96	92	96	96	97	97	574	14	
31	Vladimir Isakov	Russia	94	93	96	96	98	97	574	12	
32	Atallah Al-Anazi	Saudi Arabia	96	94	95	95	98	95	573	18	
33	Ye Tun Naung	Myanmar	96	95	96	92	96	97	572	19	
34	Samuil Donkov	Bulgaria	96	98	97	94	94	93	572	19	
35	Pavlo Korostylov	Ukraine	98	96	95	96	95	92	572	14	
36	Blake Blackburn	Australia	91	97	95	96	96	95	570	10	
37	Jorge Grau	Cuba	95	94	96	94	94	96	569	16	
38	Pavol Kopp	Slovakia	96	93	97	95	94	94	569	12	
39	Rafael Lacayo	Nicaragua	97	95	95	95	93	94	569	8	
40	Rashid Yunusmetov	Kazakhstan	96	96	93	94	95	93	567	16	
41	Piotr Daniluk	Poland	96	96	97	95	94	89	567	14	
42	Miklós Tátrai	Hungary	94	95	95	93	94	96	567	9	
43	Marko Carrillo	Peru	94	92	97	96	92	95	566	11	
44	Daniel Repacholi	Australia	91	97	97	95	96	89	565	13	
45	Ahmed Mohamed	Egypt	93	93	92	94	98	94	564	13	
46	David Muñoz	Panama	88	98	97	94	91	95	563	15	

== Final ==
Rank	Athlete	1	2	3	4	5	6	7	8	9	10	11	12	13	14	15	16	17	18	19	20	Final	Notes
1st place, gold medalist(s)	Hoàng Xuân Vinh (VIE)	10.4	10.4	10.7	10	9.8	10.6	10.1	9.8	10.1	10.3	10.6	10.3	10.4	10	9.2	10.8	9.8	9.3	9.2	10.7	202.5	OR
2nd place, silver medalist(s)	Felipe Almeida Wu (BRA)	10.5	10.3	10.4	10.5	10.7	10.1	9.9	9.4	9.5	10.2	10.4	9.3	10.4	9.6	10.1	10.7	10.0	9.8	10.2	10.1	202.1	
3rd place, bronze medalist(s)	Pang Wei (CHN)	8.6	10.1	10.7	9.4	10.2	10.5	10.3	9.9	10.5	9.8	10.3	10.6	8.7	10.4	9.8	9.8	10.6	10.2	—		180.4	
4	Juraj Tužinský (SVK)	10.6	10.2	10.3	10.5	10.1	9.7	10.5	9.9	10.2	9	9.9	10.2	9.4	9.9	9.1	9.9	—				159.4	
5	Jin Jong-oh (KOR)	10.2	10.5	9.8	9.7	9.9	9.8	9.9	10.5	9.5	10.4	9.9	10	10.6	9.1	—						139.8	
6	Giuseppe Giordano (ITA)	9.5	10.1	9.7	10.8	10.5	10.4	10.4	10.3	8.7	9.2	9.4	9.4	—								118.4	
7	Vladimir Gontcharov (RUS)	10.2	9.7	10.5	10.1	9.1	9.8	9.9	9.7	10.7	9.2	—										98.9	
8	Jitu Rai (IND)	9.5	9.8	9.6	9.7	10.1	10.2	9.7	10.1	—												78.7	
