= Shooting at the 2016 Summer Olympics – Men's 50 metre pistol =

Olympic shooting event

Men's 50 metre pistol at the Games of the XXXI Olympiad
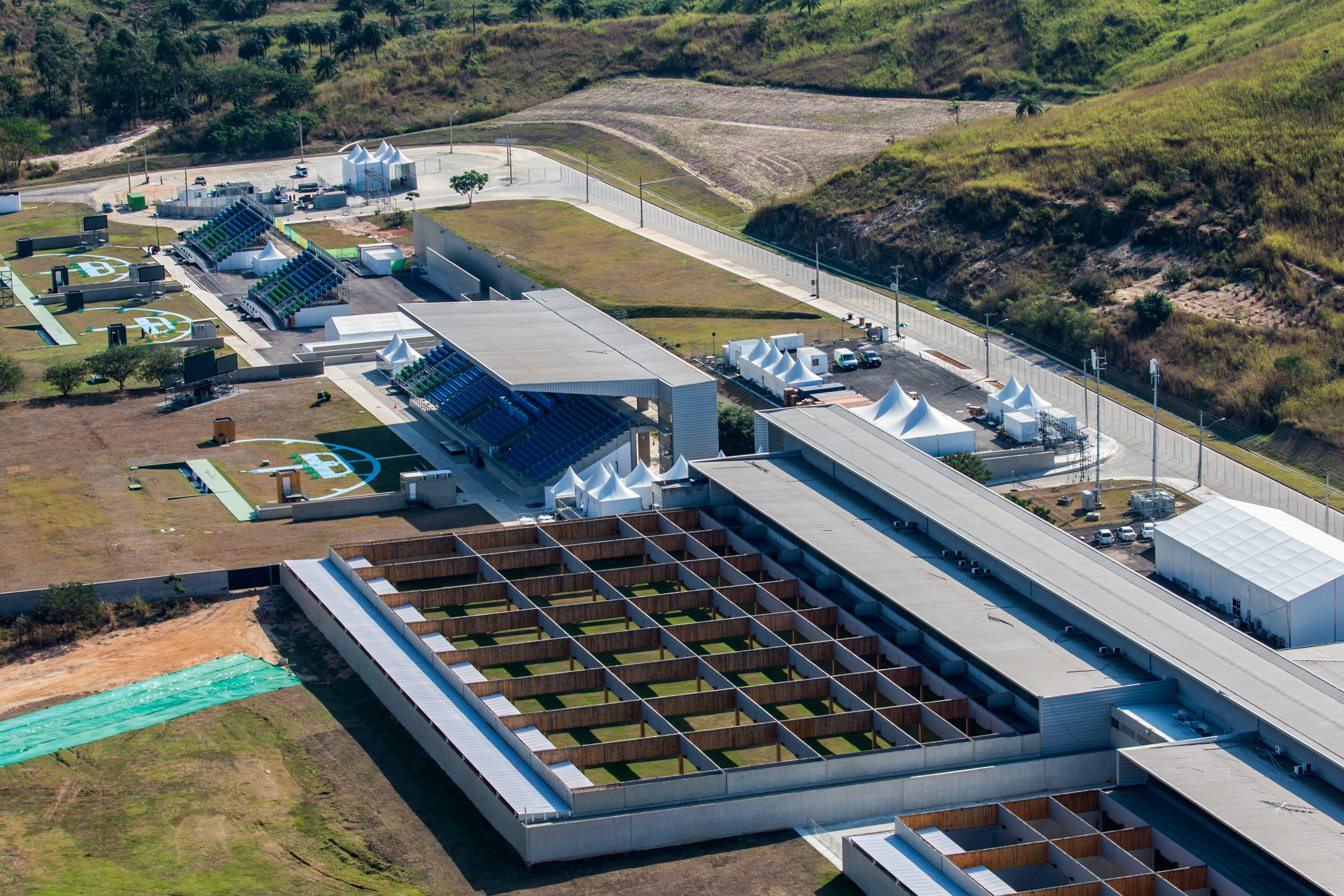
- Aerial view of the National Shooting Center in Deodoro, where the men's 50 metre pistol took place.
- Venue: National Shooting Center
- Date: 10 August 2016
- Competitors: 41 from 29 nations
- Winning score: 193.7 OR

Medalists
1st place, gold medalist(s)		Jin Jong-oh	South Korea
2nd place, silver medalist(s)		Hoàng Xuân Vinh	Vietnam
3rd place, bronze medalist(s)		Kim Song-guk	North Korea

The men's ISSF 50 meter pistol event at the 2016 Olympic Games took place on 10 August 2016 at the National Shooting Center. There were 41 competitors from 29 nations. The event was won by Jin Jong-oh of South Korea, his third consecutive victory in the free pistol. He was the only man to win two gold medals in the event, much less three. Jin was also the second man to win four medals of any color in the event, after Ragnar Skanåker of Sweden from 1972 to 1992. Hoàng Xuân Vinh took silver, the first medal for Vietnam in the event. Kim Song-guk's bronze was North Korea's first medal in the free pistol since 2004 (the nation had a silver medal stripped in 2008 due to doping).

== Background ==
This was the 24th—and final—appearance of the ISSF 50 meter pistol event. The event was held at every Summer Olympics from 1896 to 1920 (except 1904, when no shooting events were held) and from 1936 to 2016; it was open to women from 1968 to 1980. 1896 and 1908 were the only Games in which the distance was not 50 metres; the former used 30 metres and the latter 50 yards. The event, which had no women's equivalent, was dropped after 2016 to make room for a mixed team air pistol event as the sport moved toward gender equality.

Four of the eight finalists from the 2012 Games returned: two-time gold medalist (and 2004 silver medalist) Jin Jong-oh of South Korea, bronze medalist Wang Zhiwei of China, fourth-place finisher Hoàng Xuân Vinh of Vietnam, and fifth-place finisher Giuseppe Giordano of Italy. The 2014 world championship podium had been Jin Jong-oh, Jitu Rai of India, and Pang Wei of Wei; all three competed in Rio de Janeiro.

Georgia, Myanmar, and Panama each made their debut in the event. The United States made its 22nd appearance, most of any nation, having missed only the 1900 event and the boycotted 1980 Games.

Jin used a Morini CM84E.

== Qualification ==
Each National Olympic Committee (NOC) could enter up to two shooters if the NOC earned enough quota sports or had enough crossover-qualified shooters. To compete, a shooter needed a quota spot and to achieve a Minimum Qualification Score (MQS). Once a shooter was using a quota spot in any shooting event, they could enter any other shooting event for which they had achieved the MQS as well (a crossover qualification). There were 22 quota spots available for the free pistol: 4 at the 2014 World Championship, 8 at the 2015 World Cup events (2 spots at each of 4 events), 9 for continental events (3 for Europe, 2 each for Asia and Americas, and 1 each for Africa and Oceania), and a Tripartite Commission invitation. One place was added through the exchange system. There were 19 double-starters from other events, primarily the 10 metre air pistol event.

== Competition format ==
The competition featured two rounds, qualifying and final. The 2016 competition introduced fundamental changes to the final format.

The qualifying round was the same as the previous competitions: each shooter fired 60 shots, in 6 series of 10 shots each, at a distance of 50 metres. The target was round, 50 centimetres in diameter, with 10 scoring rings. Scoring for each shot was up to 10 points, in increments of 1 point. The maximum score possible was 600 points. The top 8 shooters advanced to a final.

In prior Games, the final had been an additional series of 10 shots, with the score added to their qualifying round score to give a 70-shot total. For 2016, the final instead wiped the qualifying scores and started anew. The shooters would each fire up to 20 shots in the final. However, beginning after the 8th shot and continuing every 2 shots thereafter, the shooter with the lowest total in the final was eliminated. Thus, all 8 shooters fired 8 shots, 7 shooters fired 10 shots, 6 shooters fired 8 shots, and so on until only 2 shooters fired the 19th and 20th shots. Decimal scoring applied in the final; shots could score up to 10.9. The total maximum was therefore 818.0. Any pistol was permitted.

== Records ==
Prior to this competition, the existing world and Olympic records were as follows.

Qualifying (60 shots)
World record	Jin Jong-oh (KOR)	583	Granada, Spain	9 September 2014
Olympic record	Alexsander Melentiev (URS)	581	Moscow, Soviet Union	20 July 1980

Final (80 shots)
World record	Jin Jong-oh (KOR)	200.7	Granada, Spain	7 July 2013
Olympic record	New format	-	-	-

Jin Jong-oh set the new format's initial Olympic record at 193.7; with the event discontinued, that record will never be beaten.

== Schedule ==
Date	Time	Round
Wednesday, 10 August 2016	9:00; 12:00	Qualifying; Final

== Results ==
=== Qualifying ===
Rank	Shooter	Nation	1	2	3	4	5	6	Total	Inner 10s	Notes
1	Jin Jong-oh	South Korea	95	95	91	95	94	97	567	12	Q
2	Pang Wei	China	97	91	95	94	95	93	565	11	Q
3	Han Seung-woo	South Korea	93	95	97	95	90	92	562	8	Q
4	Vladimir Gontcharov	Russia	86	92	96	96	96	91	557	13	Q
5	Kim Song-guk	North Korea	91	92	94	92	94	94	557	8	Q
6	Hoàng Xuân Vinh	Vietnam	90	93	91	92	96	94	556	11	Q
7	Pavol Kopp	Slovakia	92	93	94	91	93	93	556	8	Q
8	Wang Zhiwei	China	94	95	91	95	88	93	556	5	Q
9	Pablo Carrera	Spain	88	96	90	93	92	96	555	12	
10	Will Brown	United States	92	89	94	91	94	95	555	6	
11	João Costa	Portugal	93	91	94	91	96	89	554	11	
12	Jitu Rai	India	92	95	90	94	95	88	554	9	
13	Rashid Yunusmetov	Kazakhstan	92	94	91	93	91	92	553	8	
14	Jay Shi	United States	92	91	89	95	94	92	553	7	
15	Tsotne Machavariani	Georgia	92	91	95	91	93	90	552	11	
16	Dimitrije Grgić	Serbia	91	94	93	90	93	91	552	8	
17	Ye Tun Naung	Myanmar	90	94	90	91	94	93	552	4	
18	Damir Mikec	Serbia	89	90	93	91	94	94	551	7	
19	Tomoyuki Matsuda	Japan	93	91	92	89	94	91	550	12	
20	Atallah Al-Anazi	Saudi Arabia	92	86	92	92	96	91	550	11	
21	Oleh Omelchuk	Ukraine	92	93	88	95	90	92	550	10	
22	Yusuf Dikeç	Turkey	90	92	94	91	94	89	550	10	
23	Denis Koulakov	Russia	92	92	90	93	87	94	548	9	
24	Kim Jong-su	North Korea	89	89	91	94	93	92	548	8	
25	Prakash Nanjappa	India	85	90	91	93	95	93	547	10	
26	Giuseppe Giordano	Italy	93	89	91	91	90	93	547	4	
27	Jorge Grau	Cuba	89	90	92	95	89	91	546	6	
28	Daniel Repacholi	Australia	90	91	92	94	89	89	545	10	
29	İsmail Keleş	Turkey	89	90	90	93	90	92	544	5	
30	Júlio Almeida	Brazil	88	90	91	90	90	93	542	7	
31	Trần Quốc Cường	Vietnam	92	86	92	86	94	92	542	6	
32	Samuil Donkov	Bulgaria	91	89	91	86	88	96	541	6	
33	Juraj Tužinský	Slovakia	87	86	95	93	91	89	541	5	
34	Miklós Tátrai	Hungary	89	92	92	91	90	85	539	4	
35	Marko Carrillo	Peru	91	94	93	79	90	89	536	6	
36	Vladimir Issachenko	Kazakhstan	88	87	92	88	93	88	536	4	
37	Johnathan Wong	Malaysia	90	89	91	86	87	92	535	4	
38	Samy Abdel Razek	Egypt	82	94	90	87	90	91	534	6	
39	Felipe Almeida Wu	Brazil	92	88	87	88	89	89	533	3	
40	David Muñoz	Panama	86	91	86	91	88	86	528	9	
41	Rudolf Knijnenburg	Bolivia	89	89	85	84	87	88	522	4	

=== Final ===
After the first 8 shots, Kim led a fairly narrowly grouped top seven, with Pang well behind resulting in his elimination. The ninth shot was disastrous for two-time defending champion Jin, as the 6.6 dropped him to last place. He was able to recover in shot 10, however, and Kopp's 7.1 was enough to eliminate the Slovak while Jin narrowly survived by 0.7 points. Meanwhile, Hoàng Xuân Vinh took the lead halfway through. He and Kim continued to shoot well in the next pair, creating a 4.5 and 4.4 point lead over Jin, who had moved up to third place with a pair of 10+ shots. Han created some separation at the bottom from Wang and Gontcharov, the latter of whom was eliminated at 0.2 back of the former.

The 13th and 14th shots went very well for Jin, decently for Hoàng Xuân Vinh, and less well for Kim. The Vietnamese shooter opened a 1.5 point lead over the North Korean, but the South Korean inched a point closer to 3.5 points behind the leader (and 2 points behind Kim for second). Wang was unable to close ground on Han, and was eliminated. Shots 15 and 16 for the remaining four shooters saw 5 of 8 in the 10-ring; Kim had two of the three 9s, however, and finished the pair tied with Jin in second. They were now 2.3 points behind Hoàng Xuân Vinh (who had the other 9) as Jin closed ground. Han was well behind the lead group and eliminated in this round, solidifying the medalists.

In the final elimination pair of shots, Jin again hit a pair of 10s; the other two shooters combined for four 9s. Hoàng Xuân Vinh still held the lead, but it was down to 0.2 points now. Kim fell to third place for the first time, just as that position was the elimination place. With only the two shooters left and a very close match, Jin shot 19.3 in the final pair to win, as Hoàng Xuân Vinh only achieved 16.7 (well below needed to preserve his narrow lead).

Rank	Shooter	Nation	1	2	3	4	5	6	7	8	Int	9	10	Int	11	12	Int	13	14	Int	15	16	Int	17	18	Int	19	20	Total	Notes
1st place, gold medalist(s)	Jin Jong-oh	South Korea	9.1	8.9	10.0	9.6	9.7	10.1	10.0	8.5	75.9	6.6	9.6	92.1	10.4	10.3	112.8	9.8	10.7	133.3	10.5	10.0	153.8	10.4	10.2	174.4	10.0	9.3	193.7	OR
2nd place, silver medalist(s)	Hoàng Xuân Vinh	Vietnam	10.4	9.0	9.3	8.9	10.6	9.7	9.4	10.2	77.5	9.9	9.5	96.9	10.5	9.9	117.3	9.8	9.7	136.8	10.0	9.3	156.1	9.4	9.1	174.6	8.5	8.2	191.3	
3rd place, bronze medalist(s)	Kim Song-guk	North Korea	9.7	10.2	9.9	9.3	10.9	10.3	8.7	9.4	78.4	9.3	8.9	96.6	10.6	10.0	117.2	9.7	8.4	135.3	9.0	9.5	153.8	9.2	9.8	172.8	—N/a		172.8	
4	Han Seung-woo	South Korea	9.4	8.4	10.0	8.1	9.9	10.1	8.7	10.3	74.9	10.5	9.0	94.4	9.8	7.9	112.1	10.4	8.1	130.6	10.2	10.2	151.0	—N/a					151.0	
5	Wang Zhiwei	China	10.1	10.0	9.2	9.1	9.6	10.1	10.3	8.1	76.5	8.8	10.0	95.3	7.2	8.7	111.2	9.7	8.5	129.4	—N/a								129.4	
6	Vladimir Gontcharov	Russia	8.1	10.3	8.1	8.4	9.8	10.2	10.3	9.3	74.5	10.0	9.5	94.0	7.8	9.2	111.0	—N/a											111.0	
7	Pavol Kopp	Slovakia	7.6	10.0	9.4	10.3	10.5	8.4	9.8	10.3	76.3	8.0	7.1	91.4	—N/a														91.4	
8	Pang Wei	China	7.3	9.7	10.4	8.6	8.0	8.3	7.2	7.7	67.2	—N/a																	67.2	
