= Shooting at the 2018 Asian Games – Mixed 10 metre air pistol team =

Mixed 10 metre air pistol team at the 2018 Asian Games
- Venue: Jakabaring Shooting Range
- Dates: 19 August 2018
- Competitors: 42 from 21 nations

Medalists
| gold medal | Wu Jiayu; Ji Xiaojing | China |
| silver medal | Lee Dae-myung; Kim Min-jung | South Korea |
| bronze medal | Trần Quốc Cường; Lê Thị Linh Chi | Vietnam |

The mixed 10 metre air pistol team competition at the 2018 Asian Games in Palembang, Indonesia took place on 19 August at the Jakabaring International Shooting Range.

== Schedule ==
All times are Western Indonesia Time (UTC+07:00)

| Date | Time | Event |
|---|---|---|
| Sunday, 19 August 2018 | 11:00 | Qualification |
| Sunday, 19 August 2018 | 16:20 | Final |

== Records ==
Prior to this competition, the existing world, Asian and Games records were as follows.

Qualification
| World Record | India | 778 | Changwon, South Korea | 26 April 2018 |
| Asian Record | India | 778 | Changwon, South Korea | 26 April 2018 |
| Games Record | — | — | — | — |
Final
| World Record | China | 487.7 | Changwon, South Korea | 26 April 2018 |
| Asian Record | China | 487.7 | Changwon, South Korea | 26 April 2018 |
| Games Record | — | — | — | — |

== Results ==
=== Qualification ===
| Rank | Team | Series | | | | Total | Xs | Notes |
| Rank | Team | 1 | 2 | 3 | 4 | Total | Xs | Notes |
|---|---|---|---|---|---|---|---|---|
| 1 | China (CHN) | 191 | 194 | 190 | 194 | 769 | 21 | GR |
| | Wu Jiayu | 97 | 97 | 97 | 97 | 388 | 11 | |
| | Ji Xiaojing | 94 | 97 | 93 | 97 | 381 | 10 | |
| 2 | South Korea (KOR) | 190 | 195 | 193 | 190 | 768 | 25 | |
| | Lee Dae-myung | 95 | 97 | 97 | 95 | 384 | 11 | |
| | Kim Min-jung | 95 | 98 | 96 | 95 | 384 | 14 | |
| 3 | Japan (JPN) | 191 | 191 | 193 | 191 | 766 | 25 | |
| | Tomoyuki Matsuda | 98 | 96 | 97 | 100 | 391 | 18 | |
| | Akiko Sato | 93 | 95 | 96 | 91 | 375 | 7 | |
| 4 | Vietnam (VIE) | 188 | 192 | 191 | 191 | 762 | 23 | |
| | Trần Quốc Cường | 93 | 96 | 97 | 98 | 384 | 14 | |
| | Lê Thị Linh Chi | 95 | 96 | 94 | 93 | 378 | 9 | |
| 5 | Kazakhstan (KAZ) | 190 | 190 | 192 | 187 | 759 | 25 | |
| | Vladimir Issachenko | 95 | 95 | 96 | 96 | 382 | 16 | |
| | Zauresh Baibussinova | 95 | 95 | 96 | 91 | 377 | 9 | |
| 6 | India (IND) | 189 | 187 | 192 | 191 | 759 | 14 | |
| | Abhishek Verma | 95 | 94 | 95 | 97 | 381 | 5 | |
| | Manu Bhaker | 94 | 93 | 97 | 94 | 378 | 9 | |
| 7 | Hong Kong (HKG) | 186 | 186 | 191 | 195 | 758 | 22 | |
| | Wong Siu Lung | 94 | 92 | 94 | 98 | 378 | 9 | |
| | Shing Ho Ching | 92 | 94 | 97 | 97 | 380 | 13 | |
| 8 | Thailand (THA) | 188 | 190 | 191 | 189 | 758 | 19 | |
| | Pongpol Kulchairattana | 95 | 94 | 95 | 95 | 379 | 9 | |
| | Tanyaporn Prucksakorn | 93 | 96 | 96 | 94 | 379 | 10 | |
| 9 | Iran (IRI) | 185 | 193 | 194 | 185 | 757 | 21 | |
| | Ebrahim Barkhordari | 91 | 96 | 98 | 91 | 376 | 10 | |
| | Hanieh Rostamian | 94 | 97 | 96 | 94 | 381 | 11 | |
| 10 | Malaysia (MAS) | 187 | 190 | 188 | 190 | 755 | 22 | |
| | Johnathan Wong | 95 | 96 | 94 | 96 | 381 | 8 | |
| | Joseline Cheah | 92 | 94 | 94 | 94 | 374 | 14 | |
| 11 | Mongolia (MGL) | 187 | 192 | 186 | 190 | 755 | 15 | |
| | Enkhtaivany Davaakhüü | 94 | 96 | 92 | 98 | 380 | 9 | |
| | Tömörchödöriin Bayartsetseg | 93 | 96 | 94 | 92 | 375 | 6 | |
| 12 | Singapore (SGP) | 189 | 184 | 190 | 190 | 753 | 22 | |
| | Gai Bin | 95 | 92 | 98 | 95 | 380 | 13 | |
| | Teh Xiu Hong | 94 | 92 | 92 | 95 | 373 | 9 | |
| 13 | Myanmar (MYA) | 186 | 189 | 187 | 190 | 752 | 19 | |
| | Ye Tun Naung | 94 | 97 | 95 | 97 | 383 | 13 | |
| | May Poe Wah | 92 | 92 | 92 | 93 | 369 | 6 | |
| 14 | Oman (OMA) | 189 | 188 | 187 | 187 | 751 | 20 | |
| | Ismail Al-Abri | 95 | 96 | 95 | 92 | 378 | 11 | |
| | Wadha Al-Balushi | 94 | 92 | 92 | 95 | 373 | 9 | |
| 15 | North Korea (PRK) | 183 | 187 | 191 | 190 | 751 | 14 | |
| | Kim Song-guk | 97 | 95 | 97 | 97 | 386 | 10 | |
| | Han Yong-sim | 86 | 92 | 94 | 93 | 365 | 4 | |
| 16 | United Arab Emirates (UAE) | 185 | 189 | 183 | 190 | 747 | 11 | |
| | Ahmed Al-Ameeri | 92 | 95 | 92 | 94 | 373 | 7 | |
| | Wafa Al-Ali | 93 | 94 | 91 | 96 | 374 | 4 | |
| 17 | Qatar (QAT) | 188 | 182 | 189 | 186 | 745 | 11 | |
| | Osama Al-Shaiba | 96 | 92 | 95 | 93 | 376 | 7 | |
| | Al-Dana Al-Mubarak | 92 | 90 | 94 | 93 | 369 | 4 | |
| 18 | Indonesia (INA) | 179 | 187 | 187 | 188 | 741 | 13 | |
| | Deny Pratama | 91 | 95 | 93 | 94 | 373 | 6 | |
| | Talitha Judith Almira | 88 | 92 | 94 | 94 | 368 | 7 | |
| 19 | Bangladesh (BAN) | 189 | 177 | 181 | 187 | 734 | 14 | |
| | Noor Hasan Alif | 96 | 87 | 91 | 91 | 365 | 7 | |
| | Ardina Ferdous | 93 | 90 | 90 | 96 | 369 | 7 | |
| 20 | Laos (LAO) | 181 | 173 | 181 | 182 | 717 | 8 | |
| | Phatthana Phalichan | 92 | 83 | 85 | 91 | 351 | 2 | |
| | Viengsavanh Phommakong | 89 | 90 | 96 | 91 | 366 | 6 | |
| 21 | Tajikistan (TJK) | 182 | 175 | 179 | 176 | 712 | 11 | |
| | Bezhan Fayzullaev | 92 | 89 | 94 | 83 | 358 | 4 | |
| | Dilorom Lagutenko | 90 | 86 | 85 | 93 | 354 | 7 | |

=== Final ===
| Rank | Team | 1st stage | | | 2nd stage – Elimination | | | | S-off | Notes |
| Rank | Team | 1 | 2 | 3 | 1 | 2 | 3 | 4 | S-off | Notes |
|---|---|---|---|---|---|---|---|---|---|---|
| 1st place, gold medalist(s) | China (CHN); Wu Jiayu; Ji Xiaojing | 98.7 | 194.1 | 291.5 | 332.6 | 373.2 | 413.3 | 473.2 | | GR |
| 2nd place, silver medalist(s) | South Korea (KOR); Lee Dae-myung; Kim Min-jung | 96.9 | 195.4 | 294.2 | 330.7 | 371.3 | 409.0 | 467.6 | | |
| 3rd place, bronze medalist(s) | Vietnam (VIE); Trần Quốc Cường; Lê Thị Linh Chi | 96.3 | 193.8 | 290.6 | 327.6 | 367.0 | 407.5 | | | |
| 4 | Japan (JPN); Tomoyuki Matsuda; Akiko Sato | 94.1 | 192.6 | 290.8 | 326.7 | 362.2 | | | | |
| 5 | Kazakhstan (KAZ); Vladimir Issachenko; Zauresh Baibussinova | 89.7 | 186.9 | 285.3 | 323.9 | | | | | |
