= Shooting at the 2014 Commonwealth Games – Men's 10 metre air pistol =

Shooting – Men's 10 metre air pistol at the 2014 Commonwealth Games
- Venue: Barry Buddon Shooting Centre
- Dates: 28 July 2014
- Competitors: 32 from 17 nations

Medalists
gold medal	Daniel Repacholi	Australia
silver medal	Prakash Nanjappa	India
bronze medal	Mick Gault	England

The Men's 10 metre air pistol event took place on 26 July 2014 at the Barry Buddon Shooting Centre. Daniel Repacholi won the gold medal, Prakash Nanjappa won silver medal and Mick Gault won the bronze.

== Results ==
=== Preliminares ===
Rank	Name	Country	1	2	3	4	5	6	Final	Notes
1	Prakash Nanjappa	India	97	96	95	99	97	96	580	Q
2	Stewart Nangle	England	93	97	96	97	97	98	578	Q
3	Daniel Repacholi	Australia	97	95	95	97	96	94	574	Q
4	Muhammad Shehzad Akhtar	Pakistan	96	93	97	94	95	97	572	Q
5	Mick Gault	England	93	94	94	97	96	95	569	Q
6	Eddy Chew	Malaysia	95	94	98	97	94	91	569	Q
7	Johnathan Wong	Malaysia	96	95	92	95	95	96	569	Q
8	Uzair Ahmed	Pakistan	96	92	96	95	95	95	569	Q
9	Om Prakash	India	93	97	92	95	95	96	568	
10	Suranga Fernando	Sri Lanka	95	91	95	96	94	96	567	
11	Gai Bin	Singapore	97	94	93	94	95	94	567	
12	Roger Daniel	Trinidad and Tobago	93	94	95	92	95	96	565	
13	David Owen	Scotland	93	95	95	93	95	92	563	
14	Blake Blackburn	Australia	95	90	92	95	96	94	562	
15	Alan Ritchie	Scotland	92	95	95	94	96	90	562	
16	Lim Swee Hon	Singapore	96	92	92	96	95	91	562	
17	Allan Harding	Canada	94	93	90	96	93	94	560	
18	Ricky Zhao	New Zealand	94	94	90	94	96	91	559	
19	Rhodney Allen	Trinidad and Tobago	91	95	94	92	98	87	557	
20	Jonathan Patron	Gibraltar	93	95	90	94	91	92	555	
21	Bernard Chase	Barbados	93	94	91	88	94	92	552	
22	Edirisinghe Mudiyanselage Senanayake	Sri Lanka	90	87	95	93	91	94	550	
23	Louis Baglietto	Gibraltar	86	92	90	95	92	91	546	
24	Shaminderpal Singh Madhar	Kenya	93	90	90	90	90	91	544	
25	Shitul Shah	Kenya	89	93	93	92	88	84	539	
26	Ronald Livingstone Sargeant	Barbados	92	87	89	86	91	87	532	
27	Nevin Middleton	Falkland Islands	92	92	86	89	81	83	523	
28	Douglas Creek	Norfolk Island	85	91	87	78	90	87	518	
29	Murray Middleton	Falkland Islands	83	82	82	80	87	84	498	
30	Kevin Coulter	Norfolk Island	73	83	79	82	78	87	482	
-	Elaochi Adoyi	Nigeria	-	-	-	-	-	-	-	DNS
-	Samuel Effiong	Nigeria	-	-	-	-	-	-	-	DNS

=== Final ===
The full final results were:

Rank	Name	Country	1	2	3	4	5	6	7	8	9	Final	Notes
1st place, gold medalist(s)	Daniel Repacholi	Australia	29.4	30.3	21.1	18.8	20.3	18.9	20.8	20.2	19.7	199.5	FGR
2nd place, silver medalist(s)	Prakash Nanjappa	India	29.7	30.7	20.4	20.1	17.7	19.4	18.8	21.6	19.8	198.2	
3rd place, bronze medalist(s)	Mick Gault	England	29.7	29.5	18.7	21.0	20.8	17.7	18.8	20.3	-	176.5	
4	Eddy Chew	Malaysia	29.2	29.5	19.8	20.4	18.4	20.2	16.5	-	-	154.0	
5	Stewart Nangle	England	28.1	29.2	20.7	18.9	19.1	19.9	-	-	-	135.9	
6	Muhammad Shehzad Akhtar	Pakistan	31.8	28.1	20.1	17.0	18.4	-	-	-	-	115.4	
7	Johnathan Wong	Malaysia	29.0	28.7	18.2	18.4	−	-	-	-	-	94.3	
8	Uzair Ahmed	Pakistan	20.5	29.1	19.4	-	-	-	-	-	-	69.0	
