= Shooting at the 2010 Asian Games – Men's 25 metre center fire pistol =

Men's 25 metre center fire pistol at the 2010 Asian Games
- Venue: Aoti Shooting Range
- Dates: 18 November 2010
- Competitors: 40 from 14 nations

Medalists
gold medal	Park Byung-taek	South Korea
silver medal	Liu Yadong	China
bronze medal	Vijay Kumar	India

The men's 25 metre center-fire pistol competition at the 2010 Asian Games in Guangzhou, China was held on 18 November at the Aoti Shooting Range.

== Schedule ==
All times are China Standard Time (UTC+08:00)

Date	Time	Event
Thursday, 18 November 2010	09:00	Final

== Records ==
Prior to this competition, the existing world, Asian and Games records were as follows.

World Record	Mikhail Nestruyev (RUS)	594	Granada, Spain	17 July 2007
Asian Record	Park Byung-Taek (KOR)	590	Lahti, Finland	14 July 2002
Games Record	Jaspal Rana (IND)	590	Doha, Qatar	8 December 2006

== Results ==
Legend

- DNS — Did not start

Rank	Athlete	Precision			Rapid			Total	Xs	S-off	Notes
Rank	Athlete	1	2	3	1	2	3	Total	Xs	S-off	Notes
1st place, gold medalist(s)	Park Byung-taek (KOR)	96	98	96	99	98	99	586	21		
2nd place, silver medalist(s)	Liu Yadong (CHN)	98	96	96	99	98	98	585	22		
3rd place, bronze medalist(s)	Vijay Kumar (IND)	97	95	98	98	97	98	583	17		
4	Kim Jong-su (PRK)	98	95	99	94	97	99	582	19		
5	Jin Yongde (CHN)	99	97	96	97	92	100	581	28		
6	Poh Lip Meng (SIN)	97	97	97	99	93	98	581	18		
7	Pongpol Kulchairattana (THA)	95	96	95	98	96	100	580	18		
8	Omkar Singh (IND)	97	95	99	93	99	97	580	17		
9	Jang Dae-kyu (KOR)	94	97	96	96	98	98	579	17		
10	Gai Bin (SIN)	95	98	97	98	93	98	579	14		
11	Hà Minh Thành (VIE)	95	97	94	96	97	99	578	19		
12	Ebrahim Barkhordari (IRI)	96	96	95	95	98	98	578	17		
13	Kojiro Horimizu (JPN)	95	96	97	95	97	98	578	14		
14	Hoàng Xuân Vinh (VIE)	97	99	99	99	97	86	577	20		
15	Hasli Izwan (MAS)	99	95	91	96	98	98	577	18		
16	Hong Seong-hwan (KOR)	95	96	96	98	96	96	577	16		
17	Li Chuanlin (CHN)	92	96	96	99	99	95	577	14		
18	Ryu Myong-yon (PRK)	98	95	98	97	93	96	577	12		
19	Nguyễn Mạnh Tường (VIE)	97	97	97	96	95	94	576	23		
20	Kim Chol-rim (PRK)	94	96	97	96	97	95	575	17		
21	Teruyoshi Akiyama (JPN)	92	95	95	99	98	95	574	14		
22	Li Hao Jian (HKG)	97	97	94	96	97	92	573	16		
23	Prakarn Karndee (THA)	91	94	95	97	97	98	572	16		
24	Susumu Kobayashi (JPN)	93	96	98	94	95	96	572	16		
25	Mohammed Al-Amri (KSA)	96	95	93	94	96	97	571	17		
26	Mohammed Al-Saeed (KSA)	95	92	98	98	89	97	569	11		
27	Chio Hong Chi (MAC)	95	96	96	93	92	96	568	16		
28	Reza Karimpour (IRI)	92	96	92	94	96	98	568	15		
29	Opas Ruengpanyawut (THA)	95	94	97	91	94	97	568	13		
30	Wong Fai (HKG)	98	95	94	94	91	95	567	12		
31	Khalid Ahmed Mohamed (BRN)	93	96	97	91	94	96	567	9		
32	Harpreet Singh (IND)	97	94	96	91	89	96	563	18		
33	Yang Joe Tsi (HKG)	94	93	95	93	91	95	561	8		
34	On Shaw Ming (SIN)	88	88	95	97	96	95	559	9		
35	Mohammad Ahmadi (IRI)	94	97	96	75	97	98	557	15		
36	Ashban Sulaiman (BRN)	86	94	96	86	96	87	545	10		
37	Leong Chi Kin (MAC)	94	90	92	87	90	91	544	6		
38	Safar Al-Dosari (KSA)	94	92	95	79	96	86	542	14		
39	Manuel de Jesus Cheom (MAC)	92	92	94	93	80	88	539	9		
—	Hafiz Adzha (MAS)							DNS			
