= Kim Cheong-yong =

South Korean sport shooter

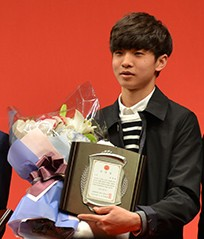

Personal information
- Full name: Kim Cheong-yong
- Nationality: South Korea
- Born: 1 January 1997 (age 29) Uiwang, Gyeonggi-do, South; Korea
- Height: 1.75 m (5 ft 9 in)
- Weight: 67 kg (148 lb)

Sport
- Sport: Shooting
- Event(s): 10 m air pistol (AP60); 50 m pistol (FP)
- Club: Heung-deok High School
- Coached by: Kim Seun-il
Medal record
Men's shooting
Representing South Korea
World Championships
Gold medal – first place	2025 Cairo	50 m meter pistol team
Silver medal – second place	2014 Granada	10 m air pistol team
Silver medal – second place	2023 Baku	50 m pistol team
Silver medal – second place	2025 Cairo	50 m pistol
Asian Games
Gold medal – first place	2014 Incheon	10 m air pistol
Asian Championships
Silver medal – second place	2015 Kuwait City	10 m air pistol team
Summer Youth Olympics
Silver medal – second place	2014 Nanjing	10 m air pistol

Kim Cheong-yong (Korean: 김청용; born January 1, 1997, in Uiwang, Gyeonggi-do) is a South Korean sport shooter. He won a silver medal in boys' 10 m air pistol shooting at the 2014 Summer Youth Olympics in Nanjing, China, and eventually claimed a gold medal to a thunderous applause from the home crowd when South Korea hosted the Asian Games a month later. Kim is a member of the shooting club at Heung-deok High School in Uiwang under his personal coach Kim Seun-il.

Kim first came to a worldwide attention as a 17-year-old at the 2014 Summer Youth Olympics in Nanjing, China, where he fired a score of 201.2 to take the silver medal in the boys' 10 m air pistol, falling short to Ukraine's Pavlo Korostylov by a stalwart 3.6-point margin.

When his nation South Korea hosted the Asian Games one month later, Kim beat a star-studded field in the final, including his personal hero and the reigning World and Olympic champion Jin Jong-oh, to claim the gold medal on his senior debut in air pistol shooting, finishing with an astonishing record of 201.2.
