= Prakash Nanjappa =

Indian sport shooter born on a leap day

Personal information
- Born: 29 February 1976 (age 50) Bangalore, India
- Height: 175 cm (5 ft 9 in) (2014)
- Weight: 82 kg (181 lb) (2014)

Sport
- Country: India
- Sport: Shooting
- Events: 10 metre air pistol 50 metre pistol
Medal record
Men's shooting
Representing India
ISSF World Cup
Bronze medal – third place	2013 Changwon	10 m air pistol
Commonwealth Games
Silver medal – second place	2014 Glasgow	10 m air pistol
Asian Games
Bronze medal – third place	2014 Incheon	10 m air pistol team
Commonwealth Championships
Gold medal – first place	2017 Brisbane	50 m pistol

Prakash Nanjappa (born 29 February 1976), also known as P N Prakash (Papanna Nanjappa Prakash), is an Indian shooter who competes in the 10 metre air pistol and 50 metre pistol events. He was the only Indian to win a medal in the 2013 ISSF World Cup, when he won bronze with a very minor difference between the second place in 10 metre air pistol event in Changwon, South Korea. In the same event, he won the silver medal at the 2014 Commonwealth Games in Glasgow.

== Early life ==
Prakash Nanjappa was born on 29 February 1976 in Bangalore to P. N. Papanna, an international-level shooter. He started shooting in 1999, though motorbike rallies was his primary interest. In 2003, he moved to Canada and worked as a software engineer till 2009, when, on his father's insistence, he quit the job and moved back to India and took up the sport again.

== Career ==
Nanjappa won a bronze medal in the 2013 ISSF World Cup in Changwon, South Korea, in the 10 metre air pistol event having scored 180.2 points in the final. In the same year, he suffered from a paralytic attack in the right side of his face, during the World Cup in Granada. Following his recovery, in October 2013, Nanjappa won the silver medal in the 50 metre pistol event in the Asian air gun championship in Tehran.

In the 2014 Commonwealth Games in Glasgow, Nanjappa won the silver medal in the 10 m air pistol event, having scored 198.2 points in the final. Earlier, he had topped the qualification round by scoring 580 points.

Nanjappa qualified for the 2016 Rio Olympics in Men's 50 metres Pistol event, where he finished 25th in the qualification round.
