= Jitu Rai =

Indian sport shooter

Subedar Major Jitu Rai Padma Shri
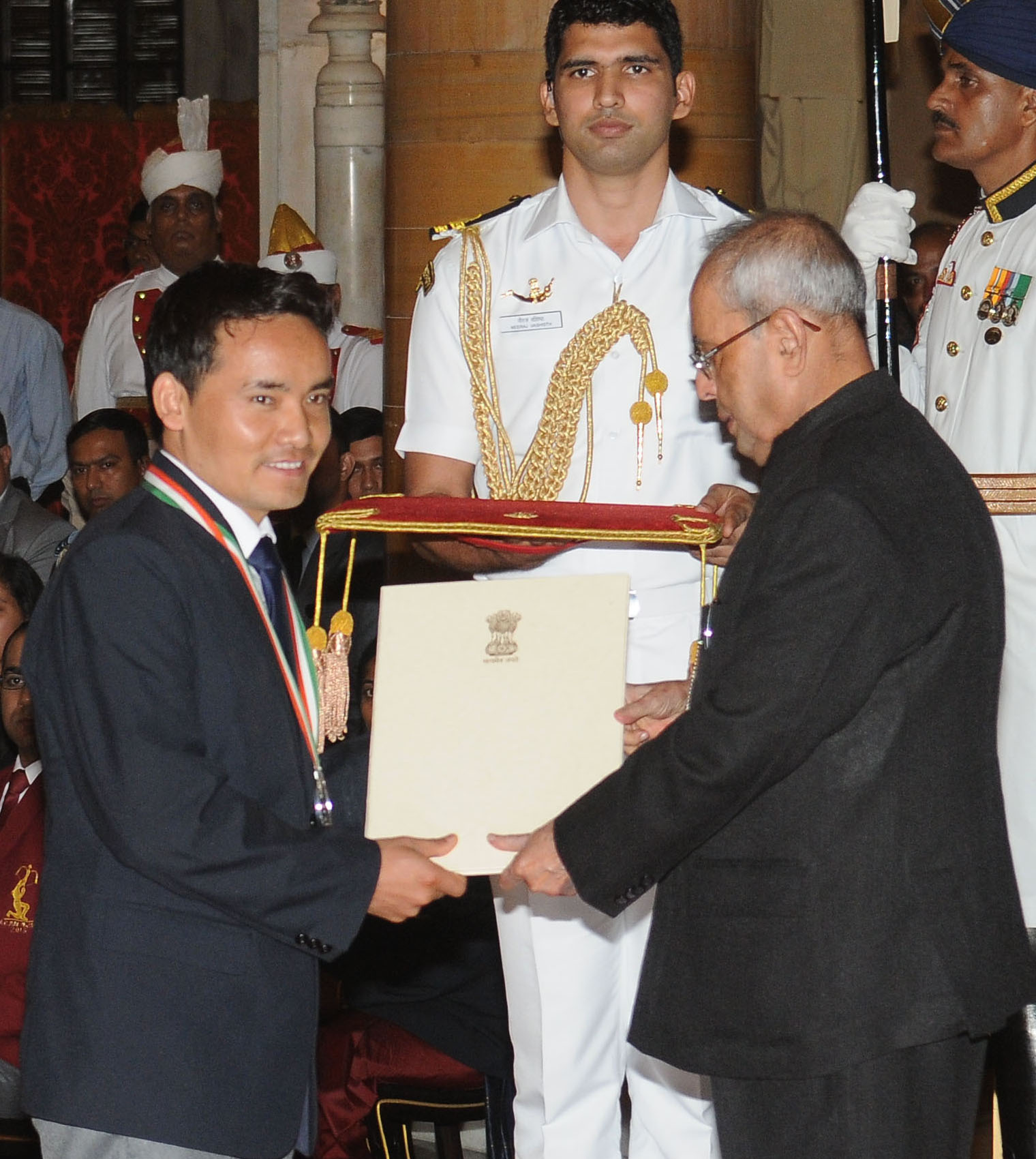
- Rai (left) receiving the Khel Ratna award in 2016

Personal information
- Nationality: Indian
- Born: 26 August 1987 (age 39) Sankhuwasabha, Nepal
- Height: 163 cm (5 ft 4 in)
- Weight: 64 kg (141 lb)
- Military career
- Allegiance: India
- Branch: Indian Army
- Rank: Subedar Major
- Unit: 11 Gorkha Rifles
- Awards: Khel Ratna (2016); Padma Shri (2020)

Sport
- Country: India
- Sport: Shooting
- Rank: 3 (10 metre air pistol); 4 (50 metre pistol)
- Events: 10 metre air pistol 50 metre pistol
Medal record
Men's shooting
Representing India
World Championships
Silver medal – second place	2014 Granada	50 m pistol
World Cup
Bronze medal – third place	2018 Mexico	10 m air pistol
Gold medal – first place	2017 New Delhi	10 m air pistol mixed team
Gold medal – first place	2014 Maribor	10 m air pistol
Silver medal – second place	2014 Munich	10 m air pistol
Silver medal – second place	2014 Maribor	50 m pistol
Bronze medal – third place	2015 Changwon	10 m air pistol
Asian Games
Gold medal – first place	2014 Incheon	50 m pistol
Bronze medal – third place	2014 Incheon	10 m air pistol team
Asian Championships
Silver medal – second place	2015 Kuwait City	50 m pistol
Commonwealth Games
Gold medal – first place	2014 Glasgow	50 m pistol
Gold medal – first place	2018 Gold Coast	10 m air pistol
Commonwealth Championships
Bronze medal – third place	2017 Brisbane	10 m air pistol
Bronze medal – third place	2017 Brisbane	50 m pistol

Jitu Rai (born 26 August 1987) is an Indian Army Subedar Major who competes in the 10 metre air pistol and 50 metre pistol events. The Government of India announced the Khel Ratna Award for him in 2016. In 2020, the Government of India honoured him with the Padma Shri, the fourth highest civilian award in the Republic of India.

== Early life ==
His early life was spent in a village of Sankhuwa Sabha district of Nepal. He is the fourth brother among five siblings. He is a Subedar Major in the 11 Gorkha Rifles of Indian Army. Rai was born and grew up in Nepal, migrated to India and joined the Army in 2006. He is a naturalized citizen of India. He also has a certificate of participation in the 2011 National Games where he represented Uttar Pradesh.

Rai first made it to the Army's shooting squad in 2010-11 but failed to live up to expectations and was subsequently sent back to his unit, putting an end to his training at the AMU in Mhow.

== Career ==
In 2014, at the ISSF World Cup in Munich, he won the silver medal in the 10 metre air pistol event. Following this, in Maribor, Rai won two medals; a silver in the 50 metre pistol event, and a gold in the 10 metre air pistol event. In the process, he won three medals in nine days at the World Cup and also became the first person to have won two medals at a single world cup for India. Following his achievements, he was ranked number 1 in the world, in 10 metre air pistol and number 4, in 50 metre pistol, in July 2014.

At the 2014 Commonwealth Games, Rai created the Games record in the qualification round of the 50 metre pistol event, having scored 562 points. He went on to win the gold medal in the event, scoring 194.1 points in the final, thus creating another Games record.

In the 2014 Asian Games held at Incheon in South Korea, Jitu won the gold medal in the 50 m pistol category. He also won a bronze in the men's 10 m air pistol team event.

In 2016, he won a silver medal at the ISSF World Cup held in Baku, Azerbaijan in the 10m Air Pistol event.

Jitu Rai had had a bad outing earlier in the 10m pistol event.

During the 2016 Olympics in the 10 M air pistol event, Jitu Rai made a remarkable comeback to sneak into the final, but failed to replicate his form as he finished last in the final of the 10 M air pistol event. The man from Lucknow lost the plot early on and could not recover, but was back for his favorite 50m pistol event on Wednesday. He made a flying start to the qualifiers with a 10-pointer, and then followed it up with two 9s. But that start did not last long as Jitu fell behind a bit with some mediocre shooting in the latter part. At one point, he dropped down to the 14th place after scoring 92 out of a possible 100 from the first round. After a disappointing first round, Jitu Rai was back in his element, though. He hit three bullseyes to hit a 95 in the second round and take his total to 187 points. However, inconsistency did not leave Jitu Rai, as he struggled once again in the third round. He managed only 90 points in that round and dropped down to the 12th spot. But, Jitu made up for the third round with some fantastic shooting in the fourth and the fifth. It was not to be in the end, though. After starting the last round in fourth place, he messed up his first three shots to slip to 6th. With only the top-8 qualifying for the final, he came back to 4th but again hit an 8 in the 6th shot. Another bad shot of 7 on the penultimate shot and he missed the final spot by a whisker. It was a disappointing slide to 12th spot after Jitu was firmly in finals territory.

At the 2018 Commonwealth Games, he broke the Commonwealth Games record for men's 10m air pistol with a total score of 235.1 points and secured his first Commonwealth Games gold medal in the relevant event. This was also Jitu Rai's second gold medal in Commonwealth Games.

== Summer Olympics ==
Year	Event	Rank	Notes
2016 Rio
2016 Rio	10 m air pistol	8	
2016 Rio	50 m pistol	12	

== See also ==
- Saniya Shaikh
