= Kojiro Horimizu =

Japanese sports shooter

Personal information
- Nationality: Japanese
- Born: 1 January 1982 (age 44) Zentsūji, Japan

Sport
- Sport: Sports shooting
Medal record
Men's shooting
Representing Japan
Asian Games
Bronze medal – third place	2010 Guangzhou	10m air pistol team
Bronze medal – third place	2010 Guangzhou	50m pistol team

Kojiro Horimizu (堀水 宏次郎, Horimizu Kōjirō, born 1 January 1982) is a Japanese sports shooter from Zentsūji in Kagawa Prefecture, Japan.

== Personal life ==
Horimizu joined the Kagawa Prefectural Police in 2000, after graduating high school, and took up shooting in 2002. He started competing in international shooting events in 2006.

As of 2021, Horimizu held the rank of Assistant Inspector in the Kagawa Prefectural Police.

== Shooting career ==
=== National sports championship ===
In 2011, Horimizu competed in the 66th National sports tournament, held in Yamaguchi, winning his event.

=== Asian games ===
Horimizu competed at the 2010 16th Asian Games in Guangzhou, China. He competed the 10 meter air pistol, 25 meter centre-fire pistol, and 50 meter pistol team events. He came 16th in the 10m air pistol, with a score of 575, 13th in the 25m metre centre-fire pistol, with a score of 578, and 7th in the 50m pistol, with a score of 556. While none of these results were enough for an individual medal, he won team bronze medals in the 10m air pistol and 50m pistol events with his team mates Susumu Kobayashi and Tomoyuki Matsuda.

=== Olympic qualification difficulties. ===
Horimizu sought selection for the 2012 London Olympics, the 2016 Rio de Janeiro Olympics, and the 2020 Tokyo Olympics. However, he failed to qualify in any of the selection meetings. He missed the mark for qualifying for London in the 10m air pistol by only one point.

In March 2021, Horimizu claimed second place for the 10 meter air pistol event at the Japanese selection event for the Tokyo Olympics. While this was not, at first sufficient to gain him a spot, the winner was unable afterwards to achieve a score high enough to gain Olympics selection, so Horimizu qualified as the highest ranked athlete in Japan who had gained qualification.

=== 2020 Tokyo Olympics ===
In the 2020 Tokyo Olympics (held in 2021 due to a delay caused by the COVID epidemic), Horimizu competed in both the men's 10 metre air pistol and mixed 10 meter air pistol events. In the mixed event he was paired with Satoko Yamada. Horimizu missed out on qualifying for the finals in both events, getting 16th in the individual 10m air pistol event, with a score of 576, and 20th in the mixed event, with a combined score of 559.
