= Lee Sang-do =

South Korean sport shooter

Lee Sang-do (born 26 April 1978) is a South Korean sport shooter who competed in the 2004 Summer Olympics.
