= Kwon Tong-hyok =

North Korean sport shooter (born 1985)

Personal information
- Nationality: North Korea
- Born: 30 January 1985 (age 41)
- Height: 1.75 m (5 ft 9 in)
- Weight: 67 kg (148 lb)

Sport
- Sport: Shooting
- Event: 10 m air pistol (AP60)

- Kwon Tong-hyok
- Hangul: 권동혁
- RR: Gwon Donghyeok
- MR: Kwŏn Tonghyŏk

Kwon Tong-hyok (Korean: 권동혁; born January 30, 1985) is a North Korean sport shooter. Kwon represented North Korea at the 2008 Summer Olympics in Beijing, where he competed in the men's 10 m air pistol, along with his teammate Kim Jong-Su. He finished only in twenty-sixth place by two points ahead of Belarus' Kanstantsin Lukashyk from the final attempt, for a total score of 575 targets.
