= Atallah Al-Anazi =

Saudi Arabian sports shooter (born 1988)

Personal information
- Born: 22 February 1988 (age 38) Khobar, Saudi Arabia

Sport
- Sport: Sports shooting
Medal record
Men's shooting
Representing Saudi Arabia
Asian Airgun Championships
| Silver medal – second place | 2021 Shymkent | 10 m air pistol team |

Atallah Al-Anazi (Arabic: عطا الله العنزي; born 22 February 1988) is a Saudi Arabian sports shooter. He competed in the men's 10 metre air pistol event at the 2016 Summer Olympics. In February 2019, he achieved 12th place in the world at the Rifle Shooting World Cup in New Delhi, the capital of India.
