= Masaru Nakashige =

Japanese sport shooter

Medal record

Men's shooting

Asian Championships
Silver medal – second place	2007 Kuwait City	10 m air pistol team
Bronze medal – third place	2012 Doha	25 m standard pistol team

Masaru Nakashige (born 28 September 1963) is a Japanese sport shooter who competed in the 1996 Summer Olympics, in the 2000 Summer Olympics, and in the 2004 Summer Olympics.
