= Susumu Kobayashi =

Japanese sport shooter

Personal information
- Nationality: Japan
- Born: 27 June 1973 (age 52) Okayama, Japan
- Height: 1.71 m (5 ft 7 1/2 in)
- Weight: 70 kg (154 lb)

Sport
- Sport: Shooting
- Event(s): 10 m air pistol (AP60); 50 m pistol (FP)
- Club: Okayama Prefectural Police
- Coached by: Emil Dushanov
Medal record
Men's shooting
Representing Japan
Asian Championships
Silver medal – second place	2007 Kuwait City	10 m air pistol team
Silver medal – second place	2012 Doha	10 m air pistol team
Bronze medal – third place	2007 Kuwait City	25 m center fire pistol team
Bronze medal – third place	2012 Doha	50 m pistol team

Susumu Kobayashi (小林 晋, Kobayashi Susumu; born June 27, 1973 in Okayama) is a Japanese sport shooter. Kobayashi represented Japan at the 2008 Summer Olympics in Beijing, where he competed in two pistol shooting events, along with his teammate Tomoyuki Matsuda. He scored a total of 577 targets in the preliminary rounds of the men's 10 m air pistol, by four points ahead of Poland's Wojciech Knapik from the final attempt, finishing only in twenty-third place. Three days later, Kobayashi placed tenth in his second event, 50 m rifle pistol, by one point behind Matsuda from the final attempt, with a total score of 558 targets.
