= Tomoyuki Matsuda =

Japanese sport shooter (born 1975)

Personal information
- Born: 12 December 1975 (age 50) Yokohama, Japan
- Height: 1.74 m (5 ft 9 in)
- Weight: 70 kg (154 lb)

Sport
- Country: Japan
- Sport: Shooting
Medal record
Men's shooting
Representing Japan
Asian Championships
Bronze medal – third place	2005 Bangkok	10 m air pistol
Silver medal – second place	2012 Doha	10 m air pistol team
Bronze medal – third place	2012 Doha	10 m air pistol
Bronze medal – third place	2012 Doha	50 m pistol team
Asian Games
Bronze medal – third place	2010 Guangzhou	10m air pistol team
Bronze medal – third place	2010 Guangzhou	50m pistol team
Bronze medal – third place	2010 Guangzhou	50m pistol

Tomoyuki Matsuda (松田 知幸, Matsuda Tomoyuki; born 12 December 1975) is a Japanese sport shooter.

== Shooting career ==
Matsuda started shooting in 2000, and began his international career in 2002.

=== Asian Championships ===
Matsuda has competed in 6 Asian Championships, with his best individual results being bronze medals in the 10m pistol events in the 2005 Bangkok and 2012 Doha Championships. He also won a team silver medal in the 2012 Doha 10m air pistol event and a team bronze in the 50m pistol event.

=== World Championships ===
Matsuda won the gold medal in the 10m air pistol and 50m pistol events at the World Championships held in Munich in 2010.

=== World Cup ===
Matsuda has won gold medals at 7 World Cup shooting events - the 50m pistol event in Munich in 2008, and again in 2011 and 2014, the 50m pistol and 10m air pistol events in Sydney in 2011, the 50m pistol event in London in 2012, and finally the 10m air pistol event in New Delhi in 2017.

=== Asian Games ===
Matsuda competed at the 2010 16th Asian Games in Guangzhou, China. He competed the 10 meter air pistol and 50 meter pistol team events. He came 13th in the 10m air pistol, with a score of 577, and 3rd in the 50m pistol, with a final score of 653.7. As well as winning the individual bronze medal in the 50m pistol, he won team bronze medals in the 10m air pistol and 50m pistol events with his team mates Susumu Kobayashi and Kojiro Horimizu.

=== Olympics ===
Matsuda has represented Japan in three Olympic Games - The 2008 Beijing Olympics, the 2012 London Olympics, and the 2016 Rio de Janeiro Olympics.

In Beijing, Matsuda got 8th place in the 50 m pistol event and 18th place in the 10 m air pistol event. In London, he finished in 11th place in the 50 m pistol event and 13th place in the 10 m air pistol event. Finally, in Rio de Janeiro, he finished 22nd in the 10m air pistol, and 19th in the 50m pistol.
