= Johnathan Wong =

Malaysian sport shooter

Personal information
- Full name: Johnathan Wong Guanjie
- Nationality: Malaysian
- Born: 23 August 1992 (age 33) Malacca, Malaysia
- Height: 1.72 m (5 ft 8 in)
- Weight: 67 kg (148 lb)

Sport
- Country: Malaysia
- Sport: Sport shooting
Medal record
Representing Malaysia
Men's shooting
Southeast Asian Games
Gold medal – first place	2017 Kuala Lumpur	10 m air pistol
Gold medal – first place	2021 Vietnam	10 m air pistol
Silver medal – second place	2017 Kuala Lumpur	50 m pistol

Johnathan Wong (born 23 August 1992) is a Malaysian sport shooter. He competed in the men's 10 metre air pistol event at the 2016 Summer Olympics. He also competed at the 2017 Southeast Asian Games which he won gold in the 10 metre air pistol event and silver in the 50 metre pistol event. He also studies aerospace engineering at Universiti Putra Malaysia.
