= Vyacheslav Podlesniy =

Kazakhstani sport shooter (born 1977)

Medal record

Men's shooting

Representing Kazakhstan

Asian Championships
Bronze medal – third place	2007 Kuwait City	10 m air pistol team
Bronze medal – third place	2007 Kuwait City	50 m pistol team

Vyacheslav Podlesnyy (born 21 September 1977 in Pavlodar) is a Kazakhstani sport shooter who competes in the men's 10 metre air pistol. At the 2012 Summer Olympics, he finished 40th in the qualifying round, failing to make the cut for the final. He also competed in the 50 metre pistol event, finishing 34th and also not qualifying for the final.
