= Lee Dae-myung =

South Korean sport shooter

Personal information
- Nationality: South Korean
- Born: 14 September 1988 (age 37) Seoul, South Korea
- Height: 1.81 m (5 ft 11 in)
- Weight: 78 kg (172 lb)

Sport
- Country: South Korea
- Sport: Shooting
- Events: 10 m air pistol (AP60); 50 m pistol (FP)
- College team: Korea National Sport University
- Club: Gyeonggi-do
- Coached by: Lee Kwon-do
Medal record
Men's shooting
Representing South Korea
World Championships
Gold medal – first place	2018 Changwon	50 m team pistol
Gold medal – first place	2018 Changwon	10 m team air pistol
Silver medal – second place	2010 Munich	FP
Bronze medal – third place	2018 Changwon	10 m air pistol
Bronze medal – third place	2018 Changwon	50 m pistol
Bronze medal – third place	2022 Cairo	10 metre air pistol team
Asian Games
Gold medal – first place	2010 Guangzhou	AP60
Silver medal – second place	2018 Jakarta–Palembang	Mixed 10 m air pistol team
Asian Championships
Gold medal – first place	2012 Doha	10 m air pistol team
Gold medal – first place	2015 Kuwait City	50 m pistol team
Gold medal – first place	2019 Doha	50 m pistol team
Silver medal – second place	2007 Kuwait City	50 m pistol team
Silver medal – second place	2012 Doha	50 m pistol team
Silver medal – second place	2015 Kuwait City	10 m air pistol team
Silver medal – second place	2019 Doha	10 m air pistol team
Asian Airgun Championships
Silver medal – second place	2022 Daegu	10 m air pistol team
Bronze medal – third place	2022 Daegu	10 m air pistol mixed team

Korean name
- Hangul: 이대명
- RR: I Daemyeong
- MR: I Taemyŏng

Lee Dae-myung (Korean: 이대명; born 14 September 1988) is a South Korean sport shooter. He won a silver medal in the men's 50 m free pistol at the 2010 ISSF World Shooting Championships in Munich, Germany, accumulating a score of 665.2 targets. He also captured two more gold medals for air pistol shooting at the 2010 Asian Games in Guangzhou, China, and at the 2012 ISSF World Cup in Sydney, Australia, with scores of 685.8 and 691.3 points, respectively.

Lee represented South Korea at the 2008 Summer Olympics in Beijing, where he competed in two pistol shooting events, along with his teammate Jin Jong-Oh. He scored a total of 580 targets in the preliminary rounds of the men's 10 m air pistol, by one point behind Uzbekistan's Dilshod Mukhtarov from the final attempt, finishing only in sixteenth place. Three days later, Lee placed twenty-sixth in his second event, 50 m pistol, by four points ahead of North Korea's Ryu Myong-Yon from the fifth attempt, with a total score of 551 targets.
