= Pu Qifeng =

Chinese sport shooter (born 1986)

Personal information
- Nationality: Chinese
- Born: 3 January 1986 (age 40) Sichuan, China
- Height: 1.85 m (6 ft 1 in)
- Weight: 80 kg (176 lb)

Sport
- Country: China
- Sport: Shooting
- Event: Air pistol
Medal record
World Championships
Bronze medal – third place	2018 Changwon	50 m team pistol
Asian Championships
Gold medal – first place	2015 Kuwait City	10 m air pistol team
Gold medal – first place	2019 Doha	10 m air pistol team
Silver medal – second place	2019 Doha	50 m pistol team
Bronze medal – third place	2015 Kuwait City	10 m air pistol

Pu Qifeng (born 3 January 1986) is a male Chinese sports shooter. He won the silver medal for 10 m air pistol at the 2014 Asian Games.
