= Pang Wei =

Chinese sport shooter (born 1986)

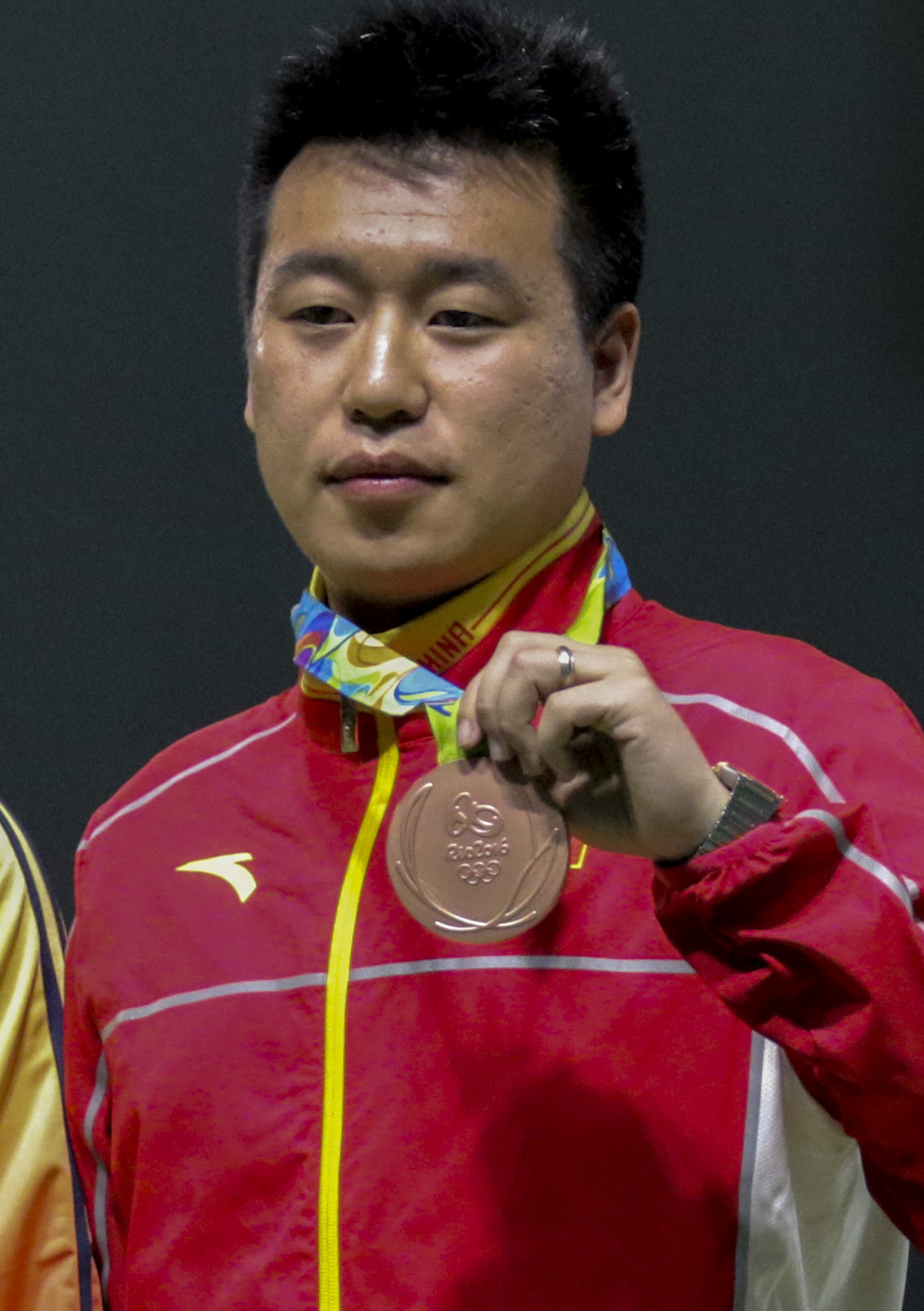
- Pang at the 2016 Summer Olympics

Personal information
- Nationality: China
- Born: 19 July 1986 (age 40) Baoding, Hebei
- Height: 1.79 m (5 ft 10 in)
- Weight: 73 kg (161 lb)

Sport
- Sport: Shooting
- Events: 10 meter air pistol, 50 meter pistol
Medal record
Men's shooting
Representing China
Olympic Games
Gold medal – first place	2008 Beijing	10 m air pistol
Gold medal – first place	2020 Tokyo	10 m air pistol mixed team
Bronze medal – third place	2016 Rio de Janeiro	10 m air pistol
Bronze medal – third place	2020 Tokyo	10 m air pistol
World Championships
Gold medal – first place	2006	10 m air pistol
Asian Championships
Gold medal – first place	2007 Kuwait City	10 m air pistol team
Gold medal – first place	2012 Doha	50 m pistol team
Gold medal – first place	2015 Kuwait City	10 m air pistol team
Gold medal – first place	2019 Doha	10 m air pistol team
Silver medal – second place	2015 Kuwait City	10 m air pistol
Silver medal – second place	2015 Kuwait City	50 m pistol team
Bronze medal – third place	2015 Kuwait City	50 m pistol
ISSF World Cup Final
Silver medal – second place	2009	10 m air pistol
Bronze medal – third place	2007	10 m air pistol

Pang Wei (Chinese: 庞伟; born 19 July 1986) is a Chinese Olympic sport shooter. He won a gold medal in the 10 metre air pistol at the 2008 Summer Olympics and a bronze medal in the same event at the 2016 Summer Olympics. He also won the 2006 ISSF World Shooting Championships in the same event, at the age of 20.

On 29 November 2009, Pang married two-time Olympic shooting champion Du Li in his hometown of Baoding, Hebei.

== Career ==
On July 23, 2006, Pang Wei won the men's 10m air pistol championship at the Zagreb World Championships.

On August 20, 2011, Pang Wei won the runner-up in the men's 10m air pistol at the Shenzhen World University Games.

On September 20, 2014, in the men's 50-meter slow-fire pistol team competition at the Incheon Asian Games, Pang Wei teamed up with Pu Qifeng and Wang Zhiwei to win the gold medal with 1692 points, winning the third gold medal for the Chinese team at the Incheon Asian Games. On September 21, in the men's 10-meter air pistol team competition, Pang Wei, Pu Qifeng and Wang Zhiwei won the runner-up with 1743 rings. On the same day, Pang Wei won the silver medal in the men's 10m air pistol individual final at the Incheon Asian Games.

Pang Wei won the runner-up in the men's 50m slow-fire pistol event at the first stop of the 2016 Shooting World Cup. On March 28, the 2016 Chinese Shooting Team Olympic Trials were held in Beijing. Pang Wei ranked first in the third men's 50m pistol slow-fire competition. He ranked first in the standings with a total score of 100 points and successfully obtained a ticket to this event at the Rio Olympics. On May 22, at the Shooting World Cup in Munich, Pang Wei won the runner-up in the men's 50m slow-fire pistol with a score of 190.3.

On August 30, 2017, the shooting competition of the 13th National Games continued at the Tianjin Tuanbo Sports Center Shooting Hall. In the men's 10-meter air pistol, Olympic champion Pang Wei won the sixth place. On September 1, the 13th National Games shooting competition entered its final day at the Tianjin Tuanbo Sports Center shooting hall. In the 10m air pistol mixed team competition, Hebei team Pang Wei/Zhao Xu narrowly defeated Henan team He Zhengyang/Zhou Ying to win the gold medal.

On November 21, 2019, Pang Wei won the gold medal in the men's 10m air pistol at the 2019 ISSF Rifle and Pistol World Cup Finals held in Putian, Fujian.

In September 2020, Pang Wei won the championship in the men's 10m air pistol competition at the National Shooting Championship (Pistol Event) with a score of 242.5.

On July 24, 2021, in the men's 10m air pistol shooting final at the Tokyo Olympics, Pang Wei won the bronze medal with 217.6 points, which is also his third medal in four Olympic Games. On September 14, in the men's 10m air pistol team competition of rifle and pistol shooting at the 14th National Games, Olympic champion Pang Wei led Hebei athletes Zhang Jie and Hu Pengqi to win the championship.

On September 14, 2021, after leading the Hebei team to win the men's 10-meter air pistol team championship at the National Games, Pang Wei revealed that he would retire after the National Games. On September 16, Pang Wei and Jiang Ranxin ranked 17th in the National Games 10m air pistol mixed team qualifying competition and were eliminated early.

== 2008 Summer Olympics ==
Pang won the gold medal in the men's 10 metre air pistol at the 2008 Summer Olympics. Having won China's first Olympic gold medal in shooting, he was awarded 2,000,000 renminbi (US$292,600) from Chinese sponsors.

== Major performances ==
- 2006 World Championships – 1st, 10 metre air pistol
- 2007 World Cup Final – 3rd, 10 metre air pistol
- 2007 National Intercity Games – 1st, 50 metre free pistol
- 2008 Summer Olympics – 10, metre air pistol
