= Enkhtaivany Davaakhüü =

Mongolian sports shooter (born 1989)

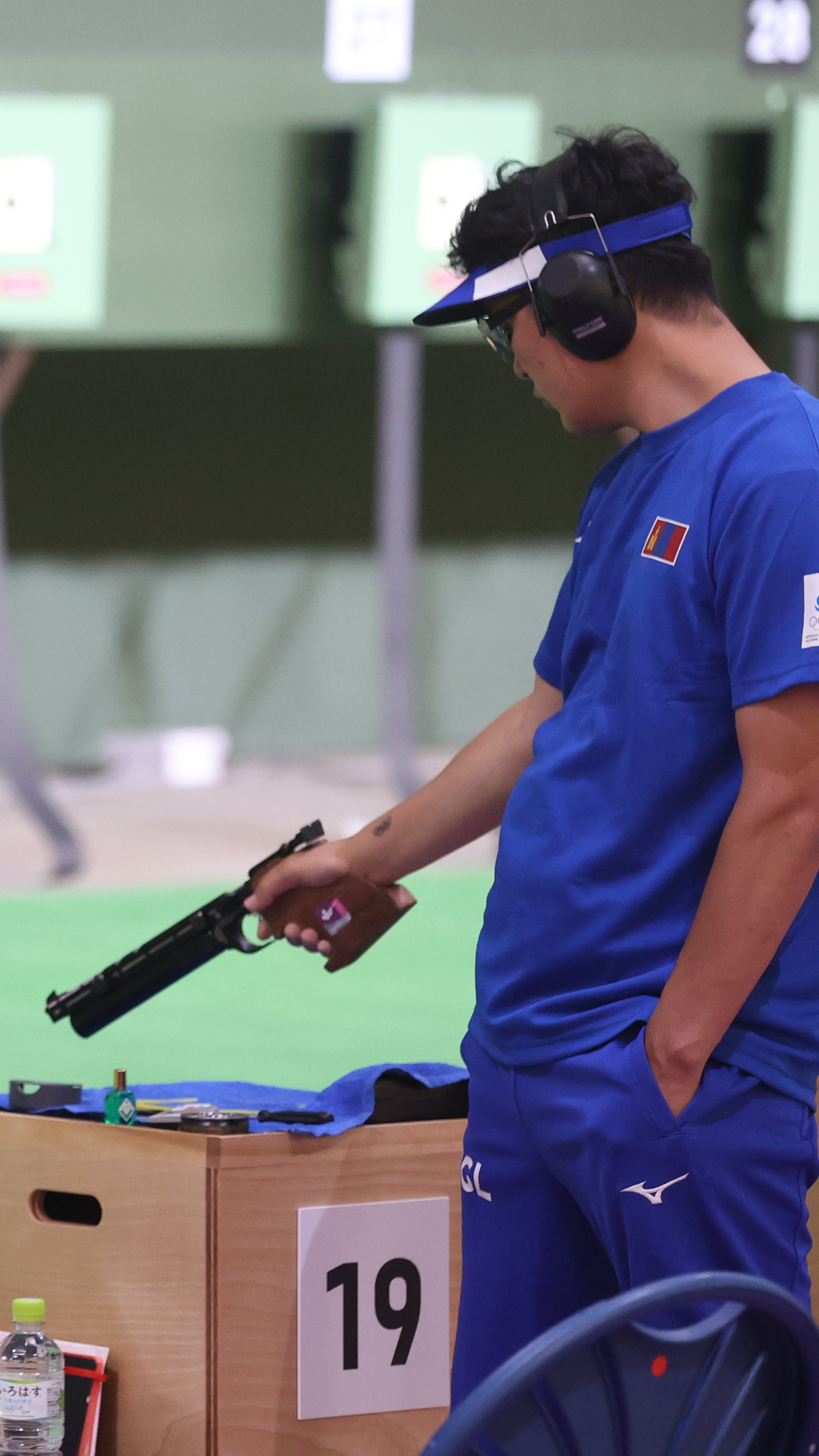
- Enkhtaivany Davaakhüü at the 2020 Summer Olympics

Personal information
- Nationality: Mongolian
- Born: 12 June 1989 (age 37) Ulaanbaatar, Mongolia

Sport
- Sport: Sports shooting
Medal record
men's shooting
Representing Mongolia
Asian Championships
Silver medal – second place	2024 Jakarta	25 m standard pistol
Bronze medal – third place	2024 Jakarta	10m air pistol
Bronze medal – third place	2025 Shymkent	50 m pistol

Enkhtaivany Davaakhüü (Mongolian: Энхтайваны Даваахүү; born 12 June 1989) is a Mongolian sports shooter. He competed in the men's 10 metre air pistol event at the 2020 Summer Olympics.
