= Vladimir Issachenko =

Kazakh sports shooter (born 1982)

Personal information
- Full name: Vladimir Nikolayevich Issachenko
- Nationality: Kazakhstan
- Born: 27 December 1982 (age 43) Temirtau, Kazakh SSR, Soviet Union
- Height: 1.95 m (6 ft 5 in)
- Weight: 85 kg (187 lb)

Sport
- Sport: Shooting
- Events: 10 m air pistol (AP60); 50 m pistol (FP)
- Club: Dynamo Almaty
- Coached by: Vladimir Vokhmyanin
Medal record
Men's shooting
Representing Kazakhstan
Asian Games
Bronze medal – third place	2006 Doha	25 m standard pistol
Asian Championships
Bronze medal – third place	2007 Kuwait City	10 m air pistol team
Bronze medal – third place	2007 Kuwait City	50 m pistol team
Asian Airgun Championships
Gold medal – first place	2021 Shymkent	10 m air pistol team

Vladimir Nikolayevich Issachenko (Kazakh: Владимир Николаевич Исаченко; born December 27, 1982, in Temirtau) is a Kazakh sport shooter. He finished sixth in free pistol shooting at the 2004 Summer Olympics, and eventually won a bronze medal in the standard pistol at the 2006 Asian Games in Doha, Qatar. Having pursued the sport since the age of eleven, Issachenko trained as a member of the shooting team for Dynamo Sport Club in Almaty under his personal coach and two-time Olympic bronze medalist Vladimir Vokhmyanin.

Issachenko qualified for the Kazakh squad in pistol shooting at the 2004 Summer Olympics in Athens, by having achieved a minimum qualifying score of 560 and securing a berth with a silver-medal effort in free pistol from the Asian Championships in Kuala Lumpur, Malaysia. In the men's 10 m air pistol, held on the first day of the Games, Issachenko shot 576 points to finish in a four-way tie with Italy's Vigilio Fait, Japan's Masaru Nakashige, and Germany's Abdulla Ustaoglu for twenty-third place. Three days later, Issachenko came strong from his frustrated air pistol feat to take the sixth spot in the 50 m pistol final with a score of 654.5 points.

At the 2006 Asian Games in Doha, Qatar, Issachenko fired a score of 570 to pick up a bronze medal in the 25 m standard pistol, just a point away from South Korea's Park Byung-taek.
