= Rashid Yunusmetov =

Kazakhstani sport shooter (born 1979)

Personal information
- Nationality: Kazakhstan
- Born: 9 July 1979 (age 46) Shymkent, Kazakh SSR, Soviet Union
- Height: 1.80 m (5 ft 11 in)
- Weight: 90 kg (198 lb)

Sport
- Sport: Shooting
- Event(s): 10 m air pistol (AP40); 50 m pistol (FP)
Medal record
Men's shooting
Representing Kazakhstan
Asian Championships
Bronze medal – third place	2007 Kuwait City	10 m air pistol team
Bronze medal – third place	2007 Kuwait City	50 m pistol team

Rashid Yunusmetov (Kazakh: Рашид Юнусметов, Raşid Iunusmetov; born July 9, 1979, in Shymkent) is a Kazakhstani sport shooter. Yunusmetov won five medals at the ISSF World Cup circuit, including gold for the 50 m free pistol (2009 in Beijing, China).

Yunusmetov represented Kazakhstan at the 2008 Summer Olympics in Beijing, where he competed in two pistol shooting events. He placed twentieth out of forty-eight shooters in the men's 10 m air pistol, with a total score of 578 points. Three days later, Yunusmetov competed for his second event, 50 m rifle pistol, where he was able to fire 10 shots each in six attempts, for a total score of 555 points, finishing in seventeenth place.
