= Jin Jong-oh =

South Korean sports shooter

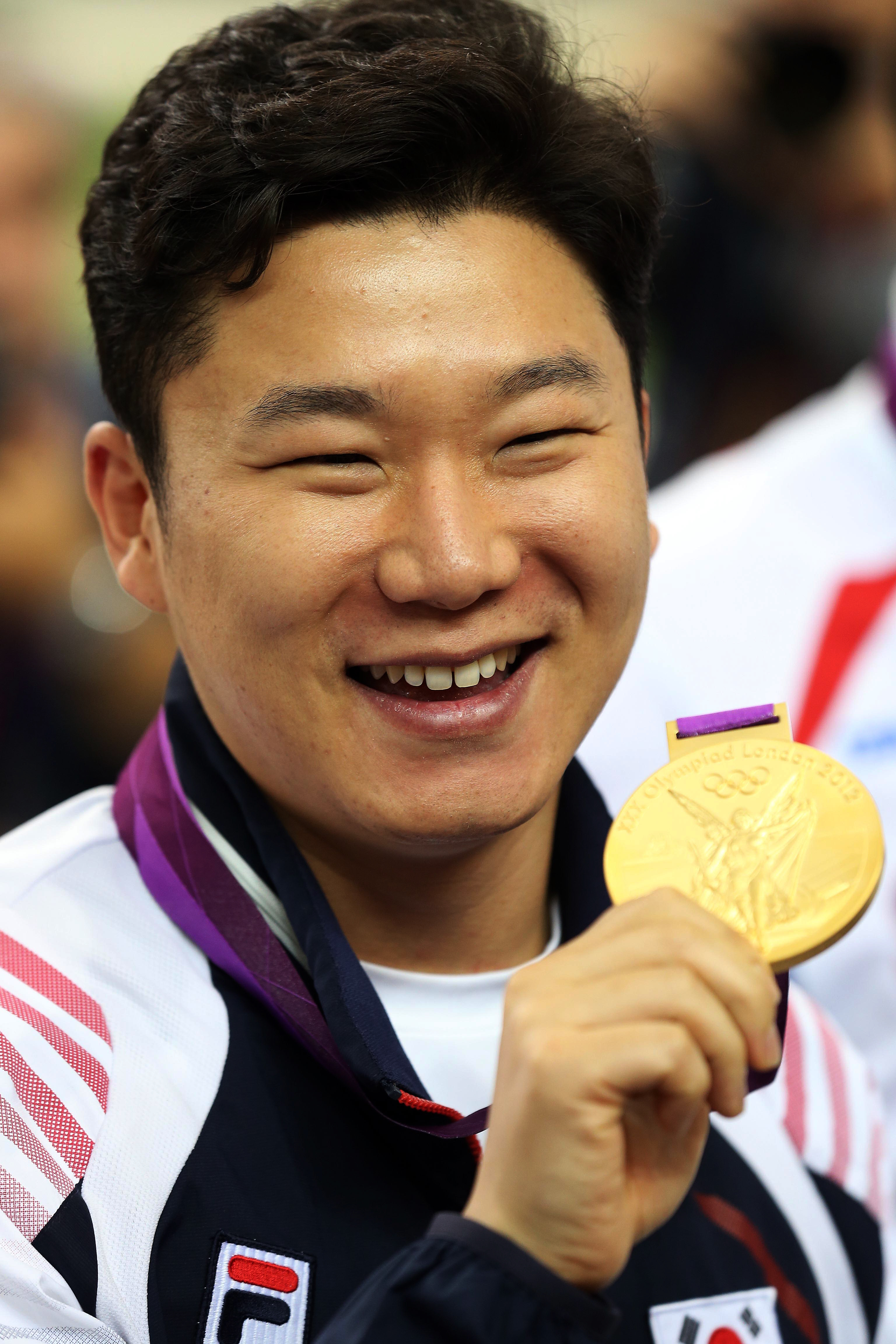

Personal information
- Native name: 진종오
- Nationality: South Korean
- Born: 24 September 1979 (age 47) Chuncheon, Gangwon
- Height: 1.75 m (5 ft 9 in)
- Weight: 78 kg (172 lb)

Sport
- Country: South Korea
- Sport: Shooting
- Events: 50 metre pistol, 10 metre air pistol
- Club: KT Sports
Medal record
Event	1st	2nd	3rd
Olympic Games	4	2	–
World Championships	4	2	2
World Cup Final	3	–	1
Asian Games	3	4	4
Asian Championships	3	3	1
Total	17	11	8
Olympic Games
Gold medal – first place	2008 Beijing	50 m pistol
Gold medal – first place	2012 London	10 m air pistol
Gold medal – first place	2012 London	50 m pistol
Gold medal – first place	2016 Rio de Janeiro	50 m pistol
Silver medal – second place	2004 Athens	50 m pistol
Silver medal – second place	2008 Beijing	10 m air pistol
World Championships
Gold medal – first place	2010 Munich	50 m pistol team
Gold medal – first place	2014 Granada	50 m pistol
Gold medal – first place	2014 Granada	10 m air pistol
Gold medal – first place	2018 Changwon	10 m air pistol
Silver medal – second place	2014 Granada	50 m pistol team
Silver medal – second place	2014 Granada	10 m air pistol team
Bronze medal – third place	2010 Munich	10 m air pistol
Bronze medal – third place	2010 Munich	10 m air pistol team
World Cup Final
Gold medal – first place	2008 Bangkok	50 m pistol
Gold medal – first place	2009 Wuxi	50 m pistol
Gold medal – first place	2009 Wuxi	10 m air pistol
Bronze medal – third place	2013 Munich	50 m pistol
Asian Games
Gold medal – first place	2010 Guangzhou	10 m air pistol team
Gold medal – first place	2010 Guangzhou	50 m pistol team
Gold medal – first place	2014 Incheon	10 m air pistol team
Silver medal – second place	2002 Busan	50 m pistol team
Silver medal – second place	2006 Doha	10 m air pistol team
Silver medal – second place	2010 Guangzhou	50 m pistol
Silver medal – second place	2014 Incheon	50 m pistol team
Bronze medal – third place	2002 Busan	10 m air pistol
Bronze medal – third place	2006 Doha	10 m air pistol
Bronze medal – third place	2006 Doha	50 m pistol team
Bronze medal – third place	2014 Incheon	10 m air pistol
Asian Championships
Gold medal – first place	2012 Doha	50 m pistol
Gold medal – first place	2012 Doha	10 m air pistol
Gold medal – first place	2012 Doha	10 m air pistol team
Gold medal – first place	2015 Kuwait City	10 m air pistol
Gold medal – first place	2015 Kuwait City	50 m pistol team
Silver medal – second place	2007 Kuwait City	50 m pistol
Silver medal – second place	2007 Kuwait City	50 m pistol team
Silver medal – second place	2012 Doha	50 m pistol team
Silver medal – second place	2015 Kuwait City	10 m air pistol team
Bronze medal – third place	2004 Kuala Lumpur	10 m air pistol

- Jin Jong-oh
- Hangul: 진종오
- Hanja: 秦鍾午
- RR: Jin Jongo
- MR: Chin Chongo

Jin Jong-oh (Korean: 진종오; pronounced [tɕin.dʑoŋ.o]; born 24 September 1979) is a South Korean sports shooter who competed at the 2004, 2008, 2012 and 2016 Summer Olympics. The only individual four-time Olympic champion in shooting, he is the most successful individual shooter at the Olympics, being the only athlete to have won three consecutive Olympic gold medals in an event (men's 50 metre pistol) in shooting. He holds the world record in both 10 metre air pistol and 50 metre pistol and held the final world record in 50 metre pistol until Jitu Rai broke it in 2017. On top of all that as of 2026 he is a member of the National Assembly (South Korea).

== Career ==
On 17 August 2004, Jin won the silver medal in the men's 50 m pistol at the 2004 Summer Olympics, with two low-scoring shots in the final round after winning the qualification round.

On 12 August 2008, Jin won the gold medal in the men's 50 m pistol at the 2008 Summer Olympics. He also gained the silver medal in the men's 10 m air pistol on 9 August of the same year.

On 28 July 2012, Jin won the gold medal in the men's 10 m air pistol at the 2012 Summer Olympics. On 5 August, he won the gold medal in the 50m, becoming the first man to successfully defend the 50-metre pistol Olympic title. By doing so, Jin also became the first man to win the 10 metre air pistol and 50 metre pistol gold medals at the same Olympics, and one of the five shooters to win two individual gold medals at one Olympics, being the first man to have done so since Otto Olsen of Norway at the 1920 Summer Olympics. He is one of three shooters to have won three Olympic individual gold medals, along with Ralf Schumann of Germany and Kim Rhode of the United States. He became the first Korean athlete to win three individual Olympic gold medals, to win four (and five) individual Olympic medals, to defend an individual title in the Summer Olympics (while Sim Kwon-Ho won Olympic gold medals for Greco-Roman wrestling in 1996 and 2000, he won two different weight divisions), to win two individual gold medals at one Summer Olympic Games and to win an individual medal for one event at three consecutive Olympic Games (Kim Soo-Nyung won individual gold, silver and bronze medals respectively for archery in the 1988, 1992 and 2000 but these Olympics were non-consecutive).

On 9 September 2014, Jin won the 50 metre pistol gold medal at the 2014 World Shooting Championships after shooting 583 points out of possible 600 in the qualification, thereby breaking the 34-year-old World Record of 581 points set by Soviet Aleksandr Melentyev at the 1980 Summer Olympics. In doing so, Jin also set several milestones not seen in 50-metre pistol since the current quadrennial intervals between the world championships were established after the 1954 World Championships; World championships were previously held annually until 1931 (with exceptions) then biennially until 1954. He became the first shooter since 1952 (and fourth overall) to have won three world-level championships (Olympics and world championships) and the first since the 1956 Summer Olympics (fourth overall) to simultaneously hold the Olympic and World titles in the discipline. He also became the second 50-metre pistol shooter (after Ragnar Skanåker in 1993) to have won the Olympics, the world championships and the World Cup Final. Two days later he also won the 10 metre air pistol gold medal at the same world championships.

On 6 August 2016, Jin placed 5th in 10 metre pistol at the 2016 Summer Olympics held in Rio de Janeiro after placing second in the qualifications. On 10 August, he placed first in the qualifications and went on to win the gold medal for 50 metre pistol at the same Olympics, coming back from 7th place during the final round. In doing so Jin became the first athlete to have won three consecutive gold medal in one event in shooting (Schumann's three gold medals in 25 metre rapid fire pistol were non-consecutive) and the first shooter to have won four individual gold medals at the Olympic Games. He also matched Chinese shooter Wang Yifu's records of six individual medals at the Olympics and most consecutive Olympic medals (four) in one event, including the silver medal he won for 50 metre pistol at the 2004 Summer Olympics. He became the first person since Torsten Ullman of Sweden in 1937 to have won three consecutive World level Championships in 50 metre pistol. With four gold and two silver medals, he became the most successful Olympian in Korean history, becoming the first Korean to have won three consecutive Olympic gold medals in one event, three Olympic gold medals in one individual event (Kim with four gold, one silver and one bronze medal won non-consecutive gold medals in Archery Team event), four individual gold medals, six individual medals, and a medal in one event at four consecutive Olympic Games.

On 6 September 2018, Jin won the 10 metre air pistol gold medal at the 2018 World Shooting Championships after a shoot-off against Russia's Artem Chernousov, trailing for most of the final round. Jin became the first man to win two (consecutive) World Championships in the event. He did not defend his title at the 50 metre pistol event, which was excluded from the Olympic program from the 2020 Summer Olympics.

== World records ==
Current world records held in 10 metre air pistol
Men	Qualification	594	Jin Jong-oh (KOR)	April 12, 2009	Changwon (KOR)

Current world records held in 50 metre pistol
Men	Qualification	583	Jin Jong-oh (KOR)	September 9, 2014	Granada (ESP)
Men	Final	230.1	Jitu Rai (IND)	March 01, 2017	New Delhi India

== Ambassadorship ==
- Ambassador for the 2022 Incheon Korea Art Festival
