= List of flag bearers for Myanmar at the Olympics =

Myanmar at the Olympics
- Flag of Myanmar
- IOC code: MYA
- NOC: Myanmar Olympic Committee
- Website: www.myasoc.org (in Burmese)
- Medals: Gold 0 Silver 0 Bronze 0 Total 0

Summer appearances
- 1948; 1952; 1956; 1960; 1964; 1968; 1972; 1976; 1980; 1984; 1988; 1992; 1996; 2000; 2004; 2008; 2012; 2016; 2020; 2024

This is a list of flag bearers who have represented Burma and Myanmar at the Olympics.

Flag bearers carry the national flag of their country at the opening ceremony of the Olympic Games.

#	Event year	Season	National flag	Flag bearer	Sport
1	1972	Summer	Union of Burma	Win Maung	Football
2	1984	Summer	(Myanmar)	Latt Zaw	Boxing
3	1988	Summer	(Myanmar)	Volunteer (Note: Flag carried by a representative of the Seoul Olympic Organizing Committee.)	–
4	1996	Summer	(Myanmar)	Soe Myint	Shooting
5	2000	Summer	(Myanmar)	Maung Maung Nge	Athletics
6	2004	Summer	(Myanmar)	Hla Win U	Official
7	2008	Summer	(Myanmar)	Phone Myint Tayzar	Canoeing
8	2012	Summer	(Myanmar)	Zaw Win Thet	Athletics
9	2016	Summer	(Myanmar)	Yan Naing Soe	Judo
10	2020	Summer	(Myanmar)	Thet Htar Thuzar	Badminton
10	2020	Summer	(Myanmar)	Ye Tun Naung	Shooting
11	2024	Summer	(Myanmar)	Phone Pyae Han	Swimming
11	2024	Summer	(Myanmar)	Thet Htar Thuzar	Badminton

== See also ==
- Myanmar at the Olympics
