= Shooting at the 2013 SEA Games – Men's 10 metre air pistol Team =

The Men's 10 metre air pistol Team event at the 2013 SEA Games took place on 15 December 2013 at the North Dagon Shooting Range in Yangon, Myanmar.

There were five teams of three shooters competed, the results of the team competition also served as qualification for individual competition, the top eight shooters qualified to individual final

Each shooter fired 60 shots with an air pistol at 10 metres distance. Scores for each shot were in increments of 1, with a maximum score of 10, all scores from three shooters per team combine to determine team scores.

== Schedule ==
All times are Myanmar Standard Time (UTC+06:30)

Date	Time	Event
Sunday, 15 December 2013	09:00	Final

== Results ==
Rank	Nation	Shooter	Score	Inner 10s	Notes
1st place, gold medalist(s)	Vietnam	Trần Quốc Cường (578); Hoàng Xuân Vinh (576); Ho Thanh Hai (551)	1705	50	
2nd place, silver medalist(s)	Singapore	Gai Bin (573); Lim Swee Hon (568); Poh Lip Meng (562)	1703	46	
3rd place, bronze medalist(s)	Malaysia	Wong Guanjie Johnathan (571); Chew Eddy (568); Choo Wen Yan (563)	1702	47	
4	Myanmar	Maung Kyu (570); Ye Tun Naung (568); Nay Htet Aung (549)	1687	37	
5	Thailand	Noppadon Sutiviruch (564); Pongpol Kulchairattana (560); Kanitpong Gongkum (556)	1680	39	
