= Shooting at the 2013 SEA Games – Men's 50 metre free pistol Team =

The Men's 50 metre free pistol Team event at the 2013 SEA Games took place on 13 December 2013 at the North Dagon Shooting Range in Yangon, Myanmar.

There were five teams of three shooters competed, the results of the team competition also served as qualification for individual competition, the top eight shooters qualified to individual final

Each shooter fired 60 shots with a pistol at 50 metres distance. Scores for each shot were in increments of 1, with a maximum score of 10, all scores from three shooters per team combine to determine team scores.

== Schedule ==
All times are Myanmar Standard Time (UTC+06:30)

Date	Time	Event
Friday, 13 December 2013	09:00	Final

== Results ==
Rank	Nation	Shooter	Score	Inner 10s	Notes
1st place, gold medalist(s)	Vietnam	Hoàng Xuân Vinh (561); Trần Quốc Cường (545); Nguyen Hoang Phuong (543)	1649	24	
2nd place, silver medalist(s)	Singapore	Gai Bin (553); Poh Lip Meng (546); Lim Swee Hon (538)	1637	26	
3rd place, bronze medalist(s)	Malaysia	Chew Eddy (548); Wong Guanjie Johnathan (546); Abdul Hadi Abdul Malek (524)	1618	23	
4	Thailand	Kasem Khamhaeng (536); Noppadon Sutiviruch (535); Kanitpong Gongkum (528)	1599	16	
5	Myanmar	Ye Tun Naung (553); Maung Kyu (531); Nay Htet Aung (509)	1593	22	
