= Myanmar at the Olympics =

- Flag of Myanmar
- IOC code: MYA
- NOC: Myanmar Olympic Committee
- Website: www.myasoc.org (in Burmese)
- Medals: Gold 0 Silver 0 Bronze 0 Total 0

Summer appearances
- 1948; 1952; 1956; 1960; 1964; 1968; 1972; 1976; 1980; 1984; 1988; 1992; 1996; 2000; 2004; 2008; 2012; 2016; 2020; 2024

Myanmar, then competing as Burma, first participated at the Olympic Games in 1948, and has sent athletes to compete in every Summer Olympic Games since then, except for the 1976 Games (due to joining the boycott against apartheid South Africa). The nation has never participated in the Winter Olympic Games. Since the 1992 Games, the nation has been designated as Myanmar in Olympic competition.

As of 2024, no Burmese athlete has ever won an Olympic medal. Kay Thi Win placed fourth in Weightlifting at the 2000 Summer Olympics – Women's 48 kg.

The National Olympic Committee for Myanmar was created in 1946 by Zaw Weik and recognized by the International Olympic Committee that same year.

== Medal tables ==
=== Medals by Summer Games ===
Games	Athletes	Gold	Silver	Bronze	Total	Rank
1948 London	4	0	0	0	0	–
1952 Helsinki	5	0	0	0	0	–
1956 Melbourne	11	0	0	0	0	–
1960 Rome	10	0	0	0	0	–
1964 Tokyo	11	0	0	0	0	–
1968 Mexico City	4	0	0	0	0	–
1972 Munich	18	0	0	0	0	–
1976 Montreal	boycotted					
1980 Moscow	2	0	0	0	0	–
1984 Los Angeles	1	0	0	0	0	–
1988 Seoul	2	0	0	0	0	–
1992 Barcelona	4	0	0	0	0	–
1996 Atlanta	3	0	0	0	0	–
2000 Sydney	7	0	0	0	0	–
2004 Athens	2	0	0	0	0	–
2008 Beijing	6	0	0	0	0	–
2012 London	6	0	0	0	0	–
2016 Rio de Janeiro	7	0	0	0	0	–
2020 Tokyo	2	0	0	0	0	–
2024 Paris	2	0	0	0	0	–
2028 Los Angeles	future event					
2032 Brisbane	future event					
Total		0	0	0	0	–

== See also ==
- List of flag bearers for Myanmar at the Olympics
- Category:Olympic competitors for Myanmar
- Myanmar at the Paralympics
- Myanmar at the Asian Games
- Myanmar at the Asian Para Games
- Myanmar at the Southeast Asian Games
