= Myanmar at the 2020 Summer Olympics =

- Flag of Myanmar
- IOC code: MYA
- NOC: Myanmar Olympic Committee
- Website: www.myasoc.org (in Burmese)

in Tokyo, Japan July 23, 2021 – August 8, 2021
- Competitors: 2 in 2 sports
- Flag bearer (opening): N/A
- Flag bearer (closing): N/A
- Medals: Gold 0 Silver 0 Bronze 0 Total 0

Summer Olympics appearances (overview)
- 1948; 1952; 1956; 1960; 1964; 1968; 1972; 1976; 1980; 1984; 1988; 1992; 1996; 2000; 2004; 2008; 2012; 2016; 2020; 2024

Myanmar competed at the 2020 Summer Olympics in Tokyo. Originally scheduled to take place from 24 July to 9 August 2020, the Games were postponed to 23 July to 8 August 2021, due to the COVID-19 pandemic. This was the nation's seventeenth appearance at the Olympics, although it had previous competed in most editions under the name Burma. Myanmar did not attend the 1976 Summer Olympics in Montreal for political reasons.

== Competitors ==
The following is the list of number of competitors in the Games.

Sport	Men	Women	Total
Badminton	0	1	1
Shooting	1	0	1
Total	1	1	2

== Badminton ==
Myanmar entered one badminton player into the Olympic tournament. Thet Htar Thuzar was selected to compete in the women's singles at the Games based on the BWF World Race to Tokyo Rankings, marking the country's debut in the sport.

Athlete	Event	Group Stage			Elimination	Quarterfinal	Semifinal	Final / BM	
Athlete	Event	Opposition Score	Opposition Score	Rank	Opposition Score	Opposition Score	Opposition Score	Opposition Score	Rank
Thet Htar Thuzar	Women's singles	Tunjung (INA); L (11–21, 8–21)	Tan (BEL); L (6–21, 8–21)	3	Did not advance				

== Shooting ==
Myanmar received an invitation from the Tripartite Commission to send a men's air pistol shooter to the Olympics, based on his minimum qualifying score (MQS) attained on or before June 5, 2021.

Athlete	Event	Qualification		Final	
Athlete	Event	Points	Rank	Points	Rank
Ye Tun Naung	Men's 10 m air pistol	576	14	Did not advance	

== See also ==
- Myanmar at the 2020 Summer Paralympics
