= Myanmar at the 2012 Summer Olympics =

- Flag of Myanmar
- IOC code: MYA
- NOC: Myanmar Olympic Committee
- Website: www.myasoc.org (in Burmese)

in London
- Competitors: 6 in 5 sports
- Flag bearer: Zaw Win Thet
- Medals: Gold 0 Silver 0 Bronze 0 Total 0

Summer Olympics appearances (overview)
- 1948; 1952; 1956; 1960; 1964; 1968; 1972; 1976; 1980; 1984; 1988; 1992; 1996; 2000; 2004; 2008; 2012; 2016; 2020; 2024; 2028

Myanmar competed at the 2012 Summer Olympics in London, held from 27 July to 12 August 2012. This was the nation's sixteenth appearance at the Olympics, although at most previous Games it competed under the name Burma. Myanmar did not participate at the 1976 Summer Olympics in Montreal for political reasons.

Myanmar Olympic Committee sent a total of six athletes to the Games, an equal number of men and women, to compete in 5 sports, tying the record with Beijing for the most athletes representing Myanmar at a single Olympics. Among these athletes, archer Nay Myo Aung and single sculls rower Shwe Zin Latt competed at their second consecutive Olympics. Pistol shooter Maung Kyu, who competed at his first Olympics, was the oldest member of the team, at 41. Meanwhile, track runner Zaw Win Thet, the youngest of the team, at age 21, was appointed by the committee as the national flag bearer at the opening ceremony. Myanmar marked its return to Olympic judo competition following a twenty-year absence.

Myanmar has yet to win an Olympic medal.

== Archery ==
Myanmar sent archers to the Olympics for the fourth time, seeking the nation's first Olympic medal in the sport. The nation was given one spot in the men's individual competition through Tripartite Commission invitation.

| Athlete | Event | Ranking round | | Round of 64 | Round of 32 | Round of 16 | Quarterfinals | Semifinals | Final / BM | |
| Athlete | Event | Score | Seed | Opposition Score | Opposition Score | Opposition Score | Opposition Score | Opposition Score | Opposition Score | Rank |
|---|---|---|---|---|---|---|---|---|---|---|
| Nay Myo Aung | Men's individual | 646 | 56 | Girouille (FRA) (9); W 6–5 | Ivashko (UKR) (24); L 1–7 | did not advance | | | | |

== Athletics ==
Key

- Note–Ranks given for track events are within the athlete's heat only
- Q = Qualified for the next round
- q = Qualified for the next round as a fastest loser or, in field events, by position without achieving the qualifying target
- NR = National record
- N/A = Round not applicable for the event
- Bye = Athlete not required to compete in round

Men

| Athlete | Event | Heat | | Semifinal | | Final | |
| Athlete | Event | Result | Rank | Result | Rank | Result | Rank |
|---|---|---|---|---|---|---|---|
| Zaw Win Thet | 400 m | 50.07 | 8 | did not advance – Report | | | |

Women

| Athlete | Event | Final | |
| Athlete | Event | Result | Rank |
|---|---|---|---|
| Ni Lar San | Marathon | 3:04:27 | 105 |

== Judo ==
Myanmar has had 1 judoka invited.

| Athlete | Event | Round of 32 | Round of 16 | Quarterfinals | Semifinals | Repechage | Final / BM | |
| Athlete | Event | Opposition Result | Opposition Result | Opposition Result | Opposition Result | Opposition Result | Opposition Result | Rank |
|---|---|---|---|---|---|---|---|---|
| Aye Aye Aung | Women's −78 kg | Bye | Yang X (CHN); L 0000–0100 | did not advance | | | | |

== Rowing ==
Myanmar has received a wild card.

Women

| Athlete | Event | Heats | | Repechage | | Quarterfinals | | Semifinals | | Final | |
| Athlete | Event | Time | Rank | Time | Rank | Time | Rank | Time | Rank | Time | Rank |
|---|---|---|---|---|---|---|---|---|---|---|---|
| Shwe Zin Latt | Single sculls | 8:10.15 | 5 R | 8:09.59 | 3 FE | Bye | | | | 8:56.06 | 28 |

Qualification Legend: FA=Final A (medal); FB=Final B (non-medal); FC=Final C (non-medal); FD=Final D (non-medal); FE=Final E (non-medal); FF=Final F (non-medal); SA/B=Semifinals A/B; SC/D=Semifinals C/D; SE/F=Semifinals E/F; QF =Quarterfinals; 'R =Repechage

== Shooting ==
Myanmar has received a wild card.

Men

| Athlete | Event | Qualification | | Final | |
| Athlete | Event | Points | Rank | Points | Rank |
|---|---|---|---|---|---|
| Maung Kyu | 10 m air pistol | 565 | 39 | did not advance | |

== See also ==
- Myanmar at the 2012 Summer Paralympics
