= Myanmar at the 2016 Summer Olympics =

- Flag of Myanmar
- IOC code: MYA
- NOC: Myanmar Olympic Committee
- Website: www.myasoc.org (in Burmese)

in Rio de Janeiro
- Competitors: 7 in 5 sports
- Flag bearer: Yan Naing Soe
- Medals: Gold 0 Silver 0 Bronze 0 Total 0

Summer Olympics appearances (overview)
- 1948; 1952; 1956; 1960; 1964; 1968; 1972; 1976; 1980; 1984; 1988; 1992; 1996; 2000; 2004; 2008; 2012; 2016; 2020; 2024

Myanmar competed at the 2016 Summer Olympics in Rio de Janeiro, Brazil, from 5 to 21 August 2016. This was the nation's sixteenth appearance at the Olympics, although it had previous competed in most editions under the name Burma. Myanmar did not attend the 1976 Summer Olympics in Montreal for political reasons.

Myanmar Olympic Committee sent a team of seven athletes, four men and three women, to compete in five different sports at the Olympics. The nation's roster size was relatively larger by a single athlete than those sent to both Beijing 2008 and London 2012 with six each. Most of them were awarded places in their respective sporting events through wild card entries and Tripartite Commission invitations, with the exception of pistol shooter Ye Tun Naung, who qualified directly for the Games on merit. Half-heavyweight judoka Yan Naing Soe led the delegation as the nation's flag bearer in the opening ceremony.

Myanmar, however, has yet to win its first Olympic medal. San Yu Htwe, who arrived in Rio de Janeiro on a Tripartite Commission invitation, overwhelmed some of the highest-ranked archers in two elimination rounds to produce a best result for Myanmar at the Games, before falling short of the third round to South Korea's defending champion Ki Bo-bae.

== Archery ==
Myanmar has received an invitation from the Tripartite Commission to send a female archer to the Olympic tournament.

Athlete	Event	Ranking round		Round of 64	Round of 32	Round of 16	Quarterfinals	Semifinals	Final / BM	
Athlete	Event	Score	Seed	Opposition Score	Opposition Score	Opposition Score	Opposition Score	Opposition Score	Opposition Score	Rank
San Yu Htwe	Women's individual	608	51	Kuoppa (FIN); W 7–3	Brown (USA); W 7–3	Ki B-b (KOR); L 0–6	Did not advance			

== Athletics ==
Myanmar has received universality slots from IAAF to send two athletes (one male and one female) to the Olympics.

Key

- Note–Ranks given for track events are within the athlete's heat only
- Q = Qualified for the next round
- q = Qualified for the next round as a fastest loser or, in field events, by position without achieving the qualifying target
- NR = National record
- N/A = Round not applicable for the event
- Bye = Athlete not required to compete in round

Track & road events

Athlete	Event	Heat		Semifinal		Final	
Athlete	Event	Time	Rank	Time	Rank	Time	Rank
San Naing	Men's 5000 m	15:51.05	24	—		Did not advance	
Swe Li Myint	Women's 800 m	2:16.98	8	Did not advance			

== Judo ==
Myanmar has received an invitation from the Tripartite Commission to send a judoka competing in the men's half-heavyweight category (100 kg) to the Olympics.

Athlete	Event	Round of 64	Round of 32	Round of 16	Quarterfinals	Semifinals	Repechage	Final / BM	
Athlete	Event	Opposition Result	Opposition Result	Opposition Result	Opposition Result	Opposition Result	Opposition Result	Opposition Result	Rank
Yan Naing Soe	Men's −100 kg	Bye	George (TTO); W 002–000	Frey (GER); L 000–100	Did not advance				

== Shooting ==
Myanmar has qualified one shooter in the men's pistol events by virtue of Ye Tun Naung's performances in the 2015 ISSF World Cup series and Asian Championships, as long as he obtained a minimum qualifying score (MQS) by March 31, 2016.

Athlete	Event	Qualification		Final	
Athlete	Event	Points	Rank	Points	Rank
Ye Tun Naung	Men's 10 m air pistol	572	33	Did not advance	
Ye Tun Naung	Men's 50 m pistol	552	17	Did not advance	

Qualification Legend: Q = Qualify for the next round; q = Qualify for the bronze medal (shotgun)

== Swimming ==
Myanmar have received a Universality invitation from FINA to send two swimmers (one male and one female) to the Olympics.

Athlete	Event	Heat		Semifinal		Final	
Athlete	Event	Time	Rank	Time	Rank	Time	Rank
Thint Myaat	Men's 100 m butterfly	1:02.54	43	Did not advance			
Ei Ei Thet	Women's 50 m freestyle	30.25	70	Did not advance			
