= Myanmar at the 2008 Summer Olympics =

- Flag of Myanmar
- IOC code: MYA
- NOC: Myanmar Olympic Committee
- Website: www.myasoc.org (in Burmese)

in Beijing
- Competitors: 6 in 5 sports
- Flag bearer: Phone Myint Tayzar
- Medals: Gold 0 Silver 0 Bronze 0 Total 0

Summer Olympics appearances (overview)
- 1948; 1952; 1956; 1960; 1964; 1968; 1972; 1976; 1980; 1984; 1988; 1992; 1996; 2000; 2004; 2008; 2012; 2016; 2020; 2024

Myanmar competed in the 2008 Summer Olympics, held in Beijing, People's Republic of China from August 8 to August 24, 2008. The country, also known as Burma, sent a total of six representatives to compete in five sports: athletics, swimming, archery, canoeing and rowing.

== Archery ==
Myanmar sent archers to the Olympics for the third time, seeking the nation's first Olympic medal in the sport. The nation was given one spot in the men's individual competition through Tripartite Commission invitation; Nay Myo Aung was Myanmar's representative in the 2008 archery competition.

Athlete	Event	Ranking round		Round of 64	Round of 32	Round of 16	Quarterfinals	Semifinals	Final / BM	
Athlete	Event	Score	Seed	Opposition Score	Opposition Score	Opposition Score	Opposition Score	Opposition Score	Opposition Score	Rank
Nay Myo Aung	Men's individual	637	52	Dobrowolski (POL) (13); L 106–110	did not advance					

== Athletics ==
Key

- Note–Ranks given for track events are within the athlete's heat only
- Q = Qualified for the next round
- q = Qualified for the next round as a fastest loser or, in field events, by position without achieving the qualifying target
- NR = National record
- N/A = Round not applicable for the event
- Bye = Athlete not required to compete in round

Men

Athlete	Event	Heat		Final	
Athlete	Event	Result	Rank	Result	Rank
Soe Min Thu	5000 m	15:50.56	14	did not advance	

Women

Athlete	Event	Heat		Quarterfinal		Semifinal		Final	
Athlete	Event	Result	Rank	Result	Rank	Result	Rank	Result	Rank
Lai Lai Win	200 m	24.37	8	did not advance					

== Canoeing ==
=== Sprint ===
Athlete	Event	Heats		Semifinals		Final	
Athlete	Event	Time	Rank	Time	Rank	Time	Rank
Phone Myint Tayzar	Men's K-1 500 m	1:48.179	7 QS	1:55.300	8	did not advance	
Phone Myint Tayzar	Men's K-1 1000 m	3:53.578	8	did not advance			

Qualification Legend: QS = Qualify to semi-final; QF = Qualify directly to final

== Rowing ==
Women

Athlete	Event	Heats		Quarterfinals		Semifinals		Final	
Athlete	Event	Time	Rank	Time	Rank	Time	Rank	Time	Rank
Shwe Zin Latt	Single sculls	8:42.23	4 QF	8:17.76	6 SC/D	8:24.23	5 FD	8:00.05	21

Qualification Legend: FA=Final A (medal); FB=Final B (non-medal); FC=Final C (non-medal); FD=Final D (non-medal); FE=Final E (non-medal); FF=Final F (non-medal); SA/B=Semifinals A/B; SC/D=Semifinals C/D; SE/F=Semifinals E/F; QF=Quarterfinals; R=Repechage

== Swimming ==
Men

Athlete	Event	Heat		Semifinal		Final	
Athlete	Event	Time	Rank	Time	Rank	Time	Rank
Kyaw Zin	50 m freestyle	26.17	77	did not advance			

== See also ==
- Myanmar at the 2008 Summer Paralympics
