= Shooting at the 2013 SEA Games – Men's 10 metre air pistol =

The Men's 10 metre air pistol event at the 2013 SEA Games took place on 15 December 2013 at the North Dagon Shooting Range in Yangon, Myanmar.

The event consisted of two rounds: a qualifier and a final. In the qualifier, each shooter fired 60 shots with an air pistol at 10 metres distance. Scores for each shot were in increments of 1, with a maximum score of 10.

The top 8 shooters in the qualifying round moved on to the final round. The final consists of 2 strings of 3 shots, after which for every two additional shots, the lowest scoring finalist will be dropped. This continues until only two finalists left making the final two shots for the gold. The Final two shooters would have total 20 shots. These shots scored in increments of 0.1, with a maximum score of 10.9.

== Schedule ==
All times are Myanmar Standard Time (UTC+06:30)

| Date | Time | Event |
|---|---|---|
| Sunday, 15 December 2013 | 09:00 | Qualification |
| Sunday, 15 December 2013 | 11:30 | Final |

== Qualification round ==
| Rank | Athlete | Country | 1 | 2 | 3 | 4 | 5 | 6 | Total | Inner 10s | Notes |
|---|---|---|---|---|---|---|---|---|---|---|---|
| 1 | Trần Quốc Cường | Vietnam | 97 | 96 | 93 | 96 | 97 | 99 | 578 | 14 | Q |
| 2 | Hoàng Xuân Vinh | Vietnam | 97 | 95 | 96 | 97 | 97 | 94 | 576 | 20 | Q |
| 3 | Gai Bin | Singapore | 96 | 95 | 94 | 97 | 95 | 96 | 573 | 18 | Q |
| 4 | Wong Guanjie Johnathan | Malaysia | 94 | 96 | 96 | 95 | 96 | 94 | 571 | 14 | Q |
| 5 | Maung Kyu | Myanmar | 95 | 96 | 97 | 96 | 93 | 93 | 570 | 17 | Q |
| 6 | Chew Eddy | Malaysia | 95 | 94 | 97 | 92 | 95 | 95 | 568 | 16 | Q |
| 7 | Lim Swee Hon | Singapore | 97 | 92 | 94 | 96 | 95 | 94 | 568 | 16 | Q |
| 8 | Ye Tun Naung | Myanmar | 98 | 94 | 93 | 93 | 96 | 94 | 568 | 15 | Q |
| 9 | Noppadon Sutiviruch | Thailand | 94 | 90 | 95 | 93 | 95 | 97 | 564 | 15 | |
| 10 | Choo Wen Yan | Malaysia | 95 | 93 | 95 | 94 | 94 | 92 | 563 | 17 | |
| 11 | Poh Lip Meng | Singapore | 94 | 93 | 96 | 95 | 94 | 90 | 562 | 12 | |
| 12 | Pongpol Kulchairattana | Thailand | 95 | 93 | 93 | 91 | 93 | 95 | 560 | 10 | |
| 13 | Kanitpong Gongkum | Thailand | 95 | 92 | 96 | 92 | 90 | 91 | 556 | 14 | |
| 14 | Ho Thanh Hai | Vietnam | 96 | 95 | 82 | 92 | 90 | 96 | 551 | 16 | |
| 15 | Nay Htet Aung | Myanmar | 92 | 90 | 90 | 91 | 93 | 93 | 549 | 5 | |

== Final ==
| Rank | Athlete | 1st Comp.Stage | | 2nd Competition Stage – Elimination | | | | | | | Total | Notes |
|---|---|---|---|---|---|---|---|---|---|---|---|---|
| 1st place, gold medalist(s) | Hoàng Xuân Vinh (VIE) | 31.1 | 60.8 | 80.8 | 100.9 | 120.4 | 139.4 | 158.6 | 178.8 | | 199.7 | |
| 1st place, gold medalist(s) | Hoàng Xuân Vinh (VIE) | 10.6 | 9.3 | 9.7 | 9.6 | 9.8 | 9.6 | 8.9 | 10.1 | 10.9 | 199.7 | |
| 1st place, gold medalist(s) | Hoàng Xuân Vinh (VIE) | 10.4 | 9.9 | 10.3 | 10.5 | 9.7 | 9.4 | 10.3 | 10.1 | 10.0 | 199.7 | |
| 1st place, gold medalist(s) | Hoàng Xuân Vinh (VIE) | 10.1 | 10.5 | | | | | | | | 199.7 | |
| 2nd place, silver medalist(s) | Chew Eddy (MAS) | 30.7 | 60.3 | 79.5 | 99.2 | 118.6 | 138.5 | 157.7 | 178.6 | | 198.0 | |
| 2nd place, silver medalist(s) | Chew Eddy (MAS) | 10.1 | 9.3 | 9.7 | 9.5 | 9.1 | 9.9 | 9.6 | 10.3 | 9.6 | 198.0 | |
| 2nd place, silver medalist(s) | Chew Eddy (MAS) | 10.7 | 10.7 | 9.5 | 10.2 | 10.3 | 10.0 | 9.6 | 10.6 | 9.8 | 198.0 | |
| 2nd place, silver medalist(s) | Chew Eddy (MAS) | 9.9 | 9.6 | | | | | | | | 198.0 | |
| 3rd place, bronze medalist(s) | Lim Swee Hon (SIN) | 30.2 | 59.3 | 78.2 | 97.9 | 116.7 | 135.4 | 156.0 | | | 176.6 | |
| 3rd place, bronze medalist(s) | Lim Swee Hon (SIN) | 10.1 | 9.2 | 9.6 | 9.6 | 10.9 | 9.8 | 10.1 | 9.9 | | 176.6 | |
| 3rd place, bronze medalist(s) | Lim Swee Hon (SIN) | 10.0 | 9.9 | 9.3 | 10.1 | 7.9 | 8.9 | 10.5 | 10.7 | | 176.6 | |
| 3rd place, bronze medalist(s) | Lim Swee Hon (SIN) | 10.1 | 10.0 | | | | | | | | 176.6 | |
| 4 | Ye Tun Naung (MYA) | 30.0 | 59.3 | 79.1 | 99.4 | 118.7 | 139.4 | | | | 154.3 | |
| 4 | Ye Tun Naung (MYA) | 10.0 | 10.0 | 10.1 | 9.7 | 9.9 | 10.5 | 8.7 | | | 154.3 | |
| 4 | Ye Tun Naung (MYA) | 9.5 | 9.9 | 9.7 | 10.6 | 9.4 | 10.2 | 6.2 | | | 154.3 | |
| 4 | Ye Tun Naung (MYA) | 10.5 | 9.4 | | | | | | | | 154.3 | |
| 5 | Maung Kyu (MYA) | 27.8 | 57.5 | 77.3 | 98.2 | 116.2 | | | | | 133.7 | |
| 5 | Maung Kyu (MYA) | 10.1 | 9.2 | 9.5 | 10.4 | 9.4 | 8.0 | | | | 133.7 | |
| 5 | Maung Kyu (MYA) | 10.3 | 10.5 | 10.3 | 10.5 | 8.6 | 9.5 | | | | 133.7 | |
| 5 | Maung Kyu (MYA) | 7.4 | 10.0 | | | | | | | | 133.7 | |
| 6 | Gai Bin (SIN) | 27.9 | 56.0 | 76.3 | 96.8 | | | | | | 115.5 | |
| 6 | Gai Bin (SIN) | 9.5 | 9.1 | 9.9 | 10.1 | 9.1 | | | | | 115.5 | |
| 6 | Gai Bin (SIN) | 9.5 | 10.1 | 10.4 | 10.4 | 9.6 | | | | | 115.5 | |
| 6 | Gai Bin (SIN) | 8.9 | 8.9 | | | | | | | | 115.5 | |
| 7 | Wong Guanjie Johnathan (MAS) | 28.9 | 59.1 | 78.1 | | | | | | | 95.0 | |
| 7 | Wong Guanjie Johnathan (MAS) | 10.1 | 9.5 | 9.7 | 8.2 | | | | | | 95.0 | |
| 7 | Wong Guanjie Johnathan (MAS) | 9.3 | 10.3 | 9.3 | 8.7 | | | | | | 95.0 | |
| 7 | Wong Guanjie Johnathan (MAS) | 9.5 | 10.4 | | | | | | | | 95.0 | |
| 8 | Trần Quốc Cường (VIE) | 27.6 | 56.2 | | | | | | | | 75.7 | |
| 8 | Trần Quốc Cường (VIE) | 9.1 | 9.6 | 9.8 | | | | | | | 75.7 | |
| 8 | Trần Quốc Cường (VIE) | 9.7 | 10.7 | 9.7 | | | | | | | 75.7 | |
| 8 | Trần Quốc Cường (VIE) | 8.8 | 8.3 | | | | | | | | 75.7 | |
