= Myanmar at the 2000 Summer Olympics =

- Flag of Myanmar
- IOC code: MYA
- NOC: Myanmar Olympic Committee
- Website: www.myasoc.org (in Burmese)

in Sydney
- Competitors: 7 in 4 sports
- Flag bearer: Maung Maung Nge
- Medals: Gold 0 Silver 0 Bronze 0 Total 0

Summer Olympics appearances (overview)
- 1948; 1952; 1956; 1960; 1964; 1968; 1972; 1976; 1980; 1984; 1988; 1992; 1996; 2000; 2004; 2008; 2012; 2016; 2020; 2024; 2028

Myanmar competed at the 2000 Summer Olympics in Sydney, Australia from September 13 to October 1, being the nation's third consecutive appearance since 1992 as Myanmar and the 12th overall the delegate participated in, including participation as Burma. Seven athletes were fielded for the games in four sports, with four of the athletes having prior regional medals. Maung Maung Nge was the chosen Flagbearer. Myanmar did not win any medals in this edition.

== Background ==
The 2000 Summer Olympics were held in Sydney, Australia from September 13 to October 1. The event was the third for the delegate as Myanmar since changing names from Burma after the 1992 Summer Olympics. The event is the 12th overall that the delegate participated in.

The delegation fielded seven athletes in four different sports. In weightlifting, the delegation fielded three candidates who took part in several competitions, winning medals in multiple, namely: Kathy Win, Swe Swe Win, Khin Moe Nwe. Another notable athlete participated in the event in swimming: Moe Thu Aung, who gained medals in continental competitions,. Several companies financed the delegation's participation in the Olympics. The chosen flagbearer for the opening ceremony was Maung Maung Nge.

== Archery ==
Thi Thi Win participated in the Women's Individual event in Archery on September 17. She participated in Match 17 in Round One, paired up against Kim Nam-soon, part of the Korean delegate. Kim won the match, with 167 points compared to Thi Thi Win's 134 points.

| Athlete | Event | Ranking round | | Round of 64 | Round of 32 | Round of 16 | Quarterfinals | Semifinals | Final / BM | |
| Athlete | Event | Score | Seed | Opposition Score | Opposition Score | Opposition Score | Opposition Score | Opposition Score | Opposition Score | Rank |
|---|---|---|---|---|---|---|---|---|---|---|
| Thi Thi Win | Women's individual | 567 | 62 | Nam-Soon Kim (KOR) (3); L 134-167 | Did not advance | | | | | 62 |

== Athletics ==
Cherry competed in the Women's 400 metre hurdles in Athletics on September 24. She competed in Heat Two, gaining 7th and last place with a time of 1:00.81 minutes. Her reaction time was marked to be 0.218 milliseconds. Maung Maung Nge competed in the Men's 5000 metres in Athletics on September 27. He competed in Heat Two, gaining 19th place, second to last, with a time of 15:12.93 minutes.

Men
Track & road events

| Athlete | Event | Heat | | Quarterfinal | | Semifinal | | Final | |
| Athlete | Event | Result | Rank | Result | Rank | Result | Rank | Result | Rank |
|---|---|---|---|---|---|---|---|---|---|
| Maung Maung Nge | 5000 m | 15:12.93 | 36 | Did not advance | | | | | |

Women
Track & road events

| Athlete | Event | Heat | | Quarterfinal | | Semifinal | | Final | |
| Athlete | Event | Result | Rank | Result | Rank | Result | Rank | Result | Rank |
|---|---|---|---|---|---|---|---|---|---|
| Cherry | 400 m hurdles | 1:00.81 | 7 | Did not advance | | | | | |

== Swimming ==
Moe Thu Aung participated in the Women's 50 metre freestyle in Swimming on September 22. She participated in heat one, winning with a time of 26.80 seconds with a reaction time of 0.76 milliseconds. She had two other opponents; one was disqualified. Moe Thu Aung decided to wait for the other opponent, who finished with a time of 1:03.97 minutes, one of the longest in history. To quote The Daily Telegraph, "she (Moe Thu Aung) could have been showered, changed, and enjoying a poolside cappuccino by the time Paula arrived." Moe Thu Ang did not advance.

Women

| Athlete | Event | Heat | | Semifinal | | Final | |
| Athlete | Event | Time | Rank | Time | Rank | Time | Rank |
|---|---|---|---|---|---|---|---|
| Aung Moe Thu | 50 m freestyle | 26.80 | 38 | Did not advance | | | |

== Weightlifting ==
Kay Thi Win participated in the Women's 48 kilograms in Weightlifting on September 17. She held 180 kilograms (400 pounds), with 80 from the Snatch, gaining 3rd place and 100 from the Clean and jerk, gaining 3rd place again. She narrowly missed the podium, gaining 4th place. Swe Swe Win joined Women's 53 kilograms in Weightlifting on September 18, participating against nine other opponents. She gained 5th place, holding 195 kg (430 lb). Khin Moe New joined Women's 58 kilograms in Weightlifting in the same day against 16 other participants.

Women

| Athlete | Event | Snatch | | Clean & jerk | | Total | Rank |
| Athlete | Event | Result | Rank | Result | Rank | Total | Rank |
|---|---|---|---|---|---|---|---|
| Kay Thi Win | 48 kg | 80.0 | =3 | 100.0 | =3 | 180.0 | 4 |
| Win Swe Swe | 53 kg | 85.0 | 5 | 110.0 | 5 | 195.0 | 5 |
| Khin Moe Nwe | 58 kg | 90.0 | 5 | 110.0 | 7 | 200.0 | 6 |
