= Shooting at the 2013 SEA Games – Men's 50 metre free pistol =

The Men's 50 metre free pistol event at the 2013 SEA Games took place on 13 December 2013 at the North Dagon Shooting Range in Yangon, Myanmar.

The event consisted of two rounds: a qualifier and a final. In the qualifier, each shooter fired 60 shots with a pistol at 50 metres distance. Scores for each shot were in increments of 1, with a maximum score of 10.

The top 8 shooters in the qualifying round moved on to the final round. The final consists of 2 strings of 3 shots, after which for every two additional shots, the lowest scoring finalist will be dropped. This continues until only two finalists left making the final two shots for the gold. The Final two shooters would have total 20 shots. These shots scored in increments of 0.1, with a maximum score of 10.9.

== Schedule ==
All times are Myanmar Standard Time (UTC+06:30)

Date	Time	Event
Friday, 13 December 2013	09:00	Qualification
Friday, 13 December 2013	11:30	Final

== Qualification round ==
Rank	Athlete	Country	1	2	3	4	5	6	Total	Inner 10s	Notes
1	Hoàng Xuân Vinh	Vietnam	94	93	89	93	98	94	561	9	Q
2	Ye Tun Naung	Myanmar	90	93	95	95	91	89	553	9	Q
3	Gai Bin	Singapore	91	93	94	89	93	93	553	6	Q
4	Chew Eddy	Malaysia	88	88	90	94	92	96	548	7	Q
5	Wong Guanjie Johnathan	Malaysia	86	88	98	95	89	90	546	12	Q
6	Poh Lip Meng	Singapore	86	94	93	93	87	93	546	10	Q
7	Trần Quốc Cường	Vietnam	89	92	90	94	88	92	545	7	Q
8	Nguyen Hoang Phuong	Vietnam	95	89	91	86	95	87	543	8	Q
9	Lim Swee Hon	Singapore	88	92	93	87	87	91	538	10	
10	Kasem Khamhaeng	Thailand	89	92	88	90	92	85	536	5	
11	Noppadon Sutiviruch	Thailand	86	86	91	92	89	91	535	6	
12	Maung Kyu	Myanmar	90	91	88	87	91	84	531	10	
13	Kanitpong Gongkum	Thailand	87	87	88	95	89	82	528	5	
14	Abdul Hadi Abdul Malek	Malaysia	87	85	90	87	85	90	524	4	
15	Nay Htet Aung	Myanmar	83	81	84	86	90	85	509	3	

== Final ==
Rank	Athlete	1st Comp.Stage		2nd Competition Stage – Elimination							Total	Notes
1st place, gold medalist(s)	Chew Eddy (MAS)	28.3	56.9	75.6	95.4	113.6	132.0	149.0	169.0		186.4	
1st place, gold medalist(s)	Chew Eddy (MAS)	9.3	10.3	10.6	9.7	8.0	10.0	8.9	10.2	9.5	186.4	
1st place, gold medalist(s)	Chew Eddy (MAS)	9.6	9.7	8.1	10.1	10.2	8.4	8.1	9.8	7.9	186.4	
1st place, gold medalist(s)	Chew Eddy (MAS)	9.4	8.6								186.4	
2nd place, silver medalist(s)	Ye Tun Naung (MYA)	28.6	58.9	75.3	94.4	114.7	130.6	150.0	167.1		185.7	
2nd place, silver medalist(s)	Ye Tun Naung (MYA)	9.5	10.8	9.0	9.1	10.5	8.7	10.1	7.1	8.3	185.7	
2nd place, silver medalist(s)	Ye Tun Naung (MYA)	9.9	9.7	7.4	10.0	9.8	7.2	9.3	10.0	10.3	185.7	
2nd place, silver medalist(s)	Ye Tun Naung (MYA)	9.2	9.8								185.7	
3rd place, bronze medalist(s)	Wong Guanjie Johnathan (MAS)	26.4	55.5	73.6	91.8	110.9	130.7	149.6			166.0	
3rd place, bronze medalist(s)	Wong Guanjie Johnathan (MAS)	9.1	9.5	9.6	9.2	10.1	9.8	9.8	8.9		166.0	
3rd place, bronze medalist(s)	Wong Guanjie Johnathan (MAS)	7.2	9.3	8.5	9.0	9.0	10.0	9.1	7.5		166.0	
3rd place, bronze medalist(s)	Wong Guanjie Johnathan (MAS)	10.1	10.3								166.0	
4	Hoàng Xuân Vinh (VIE)	28.2	57.1	76.4	94.8	112.6	131.5				148.1	
4	Hoàng Xuân Vinh (VIE)	10.0	10.4	9.6	10.1	7.6	8.8	6.9			148.1	
4	Hoàng Xuân Vinh (VIE)	9.0	8.2	9.7	8.3	10.2	10.1	9.7			148.1	
4	Hoàng Xuân Vinh (VIE)	9.2	10.3								148.1	
5	Nguyen Hoang Phuong (VIE)	25.4	54.2	74.3	91.9	108.7					127.6	
5	Nguyen Hoang Phuong (VIE)	9.8	9.9	10.3	8.6	9.2	8.8				127.6	
5	Nguyen Hoang Phuong (VIE)	8.3	9.8	9.8	9.0	7.6	10.1				127.6	
5	Nguyen Hoang Phuong (VIE)	7.3	9.1								127.6	
6	Trần Quốc Cường (VIE)	28.3	54.5	74.1	90.3						108.6	
6	Trần Quốc Cường (VIE)	9.0	10.6	9.7	7.4	8.0					108.6	
6	Trần Quốc Cường (VIE)	10.2	8.9	9.9	8.8	10.3					108.6	
6	Trần Quốc Cường (VIE)	9.1	6.7								108.6	
7	Gai Bin (SIN)	24.2	53.3	71.4							89.3	
7	Gai Bin (SIN)	9.5	9.9	10.0	9.3						89.3	
7	Gai Bin (SIN)	7.1	9.2	8.1	8.6						89.3	
7	Gai Bin (SIN)	7.6	10.0								89.3	
8	Poh Lip Meng (SIN)	27.9	51.0								70.5	
8	Poh Lip Meng (SIN)	10.4	8.5	10.7							70.5	
8	Poh Lip Meng (SIN)	10.6	6.0	8.8							70.5	
8	Poh Lip Meng (SIN)	6.9	8.6								70.5	
