= Myanmar at the 2004 Summer Olympics =

- Flag of Myanmar
- IOC code: MYA
- NOC: Myanmar Olympic Committee
- Website: www.myasoc.org (in Burmese)

in Athens
- Competitors: 2 in 2 sports
- Flag bearer: U Hla Win (weightlifting coach)
- Medals: Gold 0 Silver 0 Bronze 0 Total 0

Summer Olympics appearances (overview)
- 1948; 1952; 1956; 1960; 1964; 1968; 1972; 1976; 1980; 1984; 1988; 1992; 1996; 2000; 2004; 2008; 2012; 2016; 2020; 2024

Myanmar competed at the 2004 Summer Olympics in Athens, Greece, from 13 to 29 August 2004. This was the nation's fourteenth appearance at the Olympics, although it had previous competed in most games under the name Burma. Myanmar, however, did not participate at the 1976 Summer Olympics in Montreal for political reasons.

Myanmar Olympic Committee sent only two women to compete only in archery and weightlifting, respectively. Weightlifting coach U Hla Win was among the officials and coaches who carried their national flags in the opening ceremony.

Myanmar, however, has yet to win its first ever Olympic medal. On August 14, 2004, weightlifter Nan Aye Khine managed to achieve a fourth-place finish in the women's 48 kg class, but the International Olympic Committee decided to expel her from the Games when she was tested positive for an anabolic steroid three days later.

== Archery ==
One Burmese archer qualified only for the women's individual archery. Thin Thin Khaing drew an opponent ranked 70 places ahead of her in the opening round, but made the most of it, managing to make it the closest match of the Games. Down one point with two arrows left, Thin hit a ten and watched her opponent score eight, pulling her ahead. However, her Polish opponent responded with a ten on her final shot to force a tie. On the first tiebreaker shot, both archers shot a nine, which they both repeated on the second shot. On the third shot, Sobieraj hit another nine, but Thin could only manage a seven, which eliminated her.

| Athlete | Event | Ranking round | | Round of 64 | Round of 32 | Round of 16 | Quarterfinals | Semifinals | Final / BM | |
| Athlete | Event | Score | Seed | Opposition Score | Opposition Score | Opposition Score | Opposition Score | Opposition Score | Opposition Score | Rank |
|---|---|---|---|---|---|---|---|---|---|---|
| Thin Thin Khaing | Women's individual | 622 | 38 | Sobieraj (POL); L 151 (33)–151 (35) | did not advance | | | | | |

== Weightlifting ==
Myanmar has qualified a single weightlifter.

| Athlete | Event | Snatch | | Clean & Jerk | | Total | Rank |
| Athlete | Event | Result | Rank | Result | Rank | Total | Rank |
|---|---|---|---|---|---|---|---|
| Nan Aye Khine | Women's −48 kg | 82.5 | =4 | 107.5 | =4 | ~~190~~ | DSQ |

== See also ==
- Myanmar at the 2002 Asian Games
