= Myanmar at the 1992 Summer Paralympics =

- IPC code: MYA
- NPC: National Paralympic Committee of Myanmar

in Barcelona
- Competitors: 1
- Medals: Gold 0 Silver 0 Bronze 0 Total 0

Summer Paralympics appearances (overview)
- 1976; 1980; 1984; 1988; 1992; 1996–2004; 2008; 2012; 2016; 2020; 2024

Myanmar competed at the 1992 Summer Paralympics in Barcelona, Spain. 1 competitors from Myanmar won no medals and so did not place in the medal table.

== See also ==
- Myanmar at the Paralympics
- Myanmar at the 1992 Summer Olympics
