= Myanmar at the 2023 World Athletics Championships =

- Flag of Myanmar
- WA code: MYA

in Budapest, Hungary 19 August 2023 – 27 August 2023
- Competitors: 1 (1 man and 0 women)
- Medals: Gold 0 Silver 0 Bronze 0 Total 0

World Athletics Championships appearances
- 1991; 1993; 1995; 1997; 1999; 2001; 2003; 2005; 2007; 2009; 2011; 2013; 2015; 2017; 2019; 2022; 2023; 2025

Myanmar competed at the 2023 World Athletics Championships in Budapest, Hungary, which were held from 19 to 27 August 2023. The athlete delegation of the country was composed of one competitor, middle-distance runner Hein Htet Aung who competed in the men's 800 metres. He qualified for the Championships upon being selected by the Myanmar Athletics Federation. In the heats, he set a new personal best though placed eighth, failing to advance further.

== Background ==
The 2023 World Athletics Championships in Budapest, Hungary, were held from 19 to 27 August 2023. The Championships were held at the National Athletics Centre. To qualify for the World Championships, athletes had to reach an entry standard (e.g. time or distance), place in a specific position at select competitions, be a wild card entry, or qualify through their World Athletics Ranking at the end of the qualification period.

As Myanmar did not meet any of the four standards, they could send either one male or one female athlete in one event of the Championships who has not yet qualified. The Myanmar Athletics Federation selected sprinter Hein Htet Aung, who would compete in the men's 800 metres. In the entry list for the Championships, he held a personal and season's best of 1:54.84 in the event.

== Results ==
Key

- Q = Qualified for the next round
- q = Qualified for the next round as a fastest loser or, in field events, by position without achieving the qualifying target
- NR = National record
- PB = Personal best
- SB = Season best
- N/A = Round not applicable for the event

=== Men ===
Aung competed in the first heat of the men's 800 metres on 22 August against eight other runners. There, he set a new personal best in the event with a time of 1:53.63. He placed eighth in his heat and failed to advance further to the semifinals as only the top three of each heat and the three next fastest athletes would be able to.

Track and road events

Athlete	Event	Heat		Semifinal		Final	
Athlete	Event	Result	Rank	Result	Rank	Result	Rank
Hein Htet Aung	800 metres	1:53.63 PB	8	Did not advance			
