= Myanmar at the 2024 Summer Paralympics =

- IPC code: MYA
- NPC: Myanmar Paralympic Sports Federation

in Paris, France August 28, 2024 – September 8, 2024
- Competitors: 1 in 1 sport
- Flag bearer: Pea Soe
- Medals: Gold 0 Silver 0 Bronze 0 Total 0

Summer Paralympics appearances (overview)
- 1976; 1980; 1984; 1988; 1992; 1996–2004; 2008; 2012; 2016; 2020; 2024

Myanmar competed at the 2024 Summer Paralympics in Paris, France, from 28 August to 8 September 2024. This was the nation's seventh time competing at the Summer Paralympic Games after it made its debut at the 1976 Summer Paralympics. The delegation consisted of only one Athlete from one sport.

== Competitors ==
The following is the list of number of competitors in the Games.

Sport	Men	Women	Total
Athletics	1	0	1
Total	1	0	1

== Athletics ==
Athlete	Event	Qualification		Final	
Athlete	Event	Result	Rank	Result	Rank
Pea Soe	Men's 100 metres T64	11.89	8	Did not advance	
Pea Soe	Men's 200 metres T64	24.42	7	Did not advance	

== See also ==
- Myanmar at the 2024 Summer Olympics
- Myanmar at the Paralympics
