= Burma at the 1984 Summer Paralympics =

- IPC code: BIR

in Stoke Mandeville/New York
- Competitors: 10
- Medals Ranked 32nd: Gold 1 Silver 2 Bronze 1 Total 4

Summer Paralympics appearances (overview)
- 1976; 1980; 1984; 1988; 1992; 1996–2004; 2008; 2012; 2016; 2020; 2024

Burma competed at the 1984 Summer Paralympics in Stoke Mandeville, Great Britain and New York City, United States. 10 competitors from Burma won 4 medals, 1 gold, 2 silver and 1 bronze and finished 32nd in the medal table.

== See also ==
- Burma at the Paralympics
- Burma at the 1984 Summer Olympics
