= Myanmar at the 2011 World Championships in Athletics =

- WA code: MYA
- National federation: Myanmar Track & Field Federation

in Daegu
- Competitors: 1
- Medals: Gold 0 Silver 0 Bronze 0 Total 0

World Championships in Athletics appearances
- 1991; 1993; 1995; 1997; 1999; 2001; 2003; 2005; 2007; 2009; 2011; 2013; 2015; 2017; 2019; 2022; 2023

Myanmar competed at the 2011 World Championships in Athletics from August 27 to September 4 in Daegu, South Korea.

== Team selection ==
A team of 2 athletes was announced to represent the country in the event. However, the following athlete did not appear on the Official Start List, resulting in only one competitor:

KEY:	Did not participate	Competed in another event

	Event	Athlete
Women	400 metres	Yin Yin Khine

== Results ==
=== Men ===
Athlete	Event	Preliminaries		Heats		Semifinals		Final	
Athlete	Event	Time Width Height	Rank	Time Width Height	Rank	Time Width Height	Rank	Time Width Height	Rank
Zaw Win Thet	800 metres			1:58.36	41	Did not advance			
