= Burma at the 1956 Summer Olympics =

- IOC code: BIR

in Melbourne/Stockholm
- Competitors: 11 in 4 sports
- Medals: Gold 0 Silver 0 Bronze 0 Total 0

Summer Olympics appearances (overview)
- 1948; 1952; 1956; 1960; 1964; 1968; 1972; 1976; 1980; 1984; 1988; 1992; 1996; 2000; 2004; 2008; 2012; 2016; 2020; 2024

Burma competed at the 1956 Summer Olympics in Melbourne, Australia. As a partial support to the Dutch-led boycott, Burmese athletes competed under the Olympic flag instead of the national flag.

== Athletics ==
Men
Track & road events

Athlete	Event	Heat		Quarterfinal		Semifinal		Final	
Athlete	Event	Result	Rank	Result	Rank	Result	Rank	Result	Rank
Naw Myitung	10000 m	—						DNF	
Naw Myitung	Marathon	—						2:49:32	26

== Boxing ==
Men

Athlete	Event	1 Round	2 Round	Quarterfinals	Semifinals	Final	
Athlete	Event	Opposition Result	Opposition Result	Opposition Result	Opposition Result	Opposition Result	Rank
Yai Shwe	Flyweight	BYE	John Caldwell (IRL); L TKO-3	did not advance			
Thein Myint	Bantamweight	BYE	Eder Jofre (BRA); L PTS	did not advance			
Yaichit Wang	Featherweight	BYE	Shinetsu Suzuki (JPN); L PTS	did not advance			
Terrence Oung	Light Welterweight	Constantin Dumitrescu (ROU); L PTS	did not advance				

== Sailing ==
Open

Athlete	Event	Race							Net points	Final rank
Athlete	Event	1	2	3	4	5	6	7	Net points	Final rank
Lwin U Maung Maung	Finn	17	~~18~~	17	17	17	17	18	1007	19
Gyi Khin Pe; Chow Park Wing	12m² Sharpie	~~DNF~~	13	11	DNF	DNF	DNS	DNS	275	13

== Weightlifting ==
Men

Athlete	Event	Military press		Snatch		Clean & Jerk		Total	Rank
Athlete	Event	Result	Rank	Result	Rank	Result	Rank	Total	Rank
Aw Chu Kee	56 kg	85,0	12	80,0	13	110,0	13	275,0	11
Tun Maung Kywe	60 kg	90,0	14	92,5	11	115,0	14	297,5	14
Nil Tun Maung	67.5 kg	110,0	7	105,0	7	137,5	7	352,5	8
