= Burma at the 1976 Summer Paralympics =

- IPC code: BIR

in Toronto
- Medals Ranked 28th: Gold 1 Silver 1 Bronze 1 Total 3

Summer Paralympics appearances (overview)
- 1976; 1980; 1984; 1988; 1992; 1996–2004; 2008; 2012; 2016; 2020; 2024

Burma sent a delegation to compete at the 1976 Summer Paralympics in Toronto, Ontario, Canada. Its athletes finished twenty eight in the overall medal count.

== Medalists ==
- Gold - Hgwe Mg Tin
- Silver - Than Mg Aung
- Bronze - Win Mg Tin
