= Aye Aye Aung (athlete) =

Burmese middle-distance runner

Personal information
- Born: 19 February 1995 (age 31) Myanmar

Sport
- Sport: Track and field
- Updated on 29 August 2015

Aye Aye Aung (born 19 February 1995) is a middle-distance runner from Myanmar. She competed in the Women's 800 metres event at the 2015 World Championships in Athletics in Beijing, China.

== See also ==
- Myanmar at the 2015 World Championships in Athletics
