= Poh Lip Meng =

Singaporean sport shooter (1969–2021)

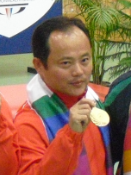
- Poh posing with gold medal at the 2010 Commonwealth Games

Personal information
- Born: 10 February 1969 Singapore
- Died: 22 December 2021 (aged 52)
- Height: 164 cm (5 ft 5 in)
- Weight: 68 kg (150 lb)

Sport
- Sport: Sports shooting

Poh Lip Meng
- Chinese: 傅立民
Transcriptions
Standard Mandarin
- Hanyu Pinyin: Fù Lìmín
Southern Min
- Hokkien POJ: Pò͘ Lip-bîn

Poh Lip Meng (Chinese: 傅立民; 10 February 1969 – 22 December 2021) was a Singaporean sport shooter who won a gold medal at the 2010 Commonwealth Games in the 25 m standard pistol pairs event and at the 2015 Southeast Asian Games in the 50 m free pistol team event.

== Career ==
Poh Lip Meng was a warrant officer in the Singapore Armed Forces when he joined the Singapore Shooting Association in 2002, after watching the 2002 Commonwealth Games shooting competition on television. In 2005, he gained his first individual medal at the 2005 Southeast Asian Games, a bronze medal in the 50 m free pistol event.

In 2010, Poh and Gai Bin were awarded gold for the 25 m standard pistol pairs event at the 2010 Commonwealth Games.

At the 2013 Southeast Asian Games, Poh competed in the 50 m free pistol team event, 50 m free pistol event, 10 m air pistol team event, and 10m air pistol event, and was awarded silver medals for the two team events.

In 2014, Poh, together with fellow national shooters, Gai and Nigel Lim, was awarded the bronze medal in the 25 metre standard pistol team event at the 2014 Asian Games, earning Singapore's first shooting medal in a men's team shooting event in the Asian Games.

At the 2015 Southeast Asian Games, Gai, Lim and Poh were awarded bronze medals for the 10 m air pistol team event.

At the time of his death in 2021, he had been selected to represent Singapore at the 2021 Southeast Asian Games in the 25 m rapid fire pistol event. The 2021 SEA Games were delayed to 2022 due to the COVID-19 pandemic. As of the time of his death, he held the national records for 10 m air pistol (2009) and 50 m free pistol (2011) men events.

== Personal life ==
Poh had two children, a son, Poh Yu Hao (born c. 2001), and a daughter. Both Lip Meng and Yu Hao had competed together at the 2018 Commonwealth Games.

He died on 22 December 2021, at the age of 52 after collapsing during a jog.
