= Myanmar at the 2024 Summer Olympics =

- Flag of Myanmar
- IOC code: MYA
- NOC: Myanmar Olympic Committee
- Website: www.myasoc.org (in Burmese)

in Paris, France 26 July 2024 – 11 August 2024
- Competitors: 2 (1 man and 1 woman) in 2 sports
- Medals: Gold 0 Silver 0 Bronze 0 Total 0

Summer Olympics appearances (overview)
- 1948; 1952; 1956; 1960; 1964; 1968; 1972; 1976; 1980; 1984; 1988; 1992; 1996; 2000; 2004; 2008; 2012; 2016; 2020; 2024

Myanmar competed at the 2024 Summer Olympics in Paris, France, from 26 July to 11 August 2024. It was the nation's nineteenth appearances at the Summer Olympics, since the official debut at the 1948, which competed mostly under the name Burma, except for 1976. Myanmar failed to win a medal at the Paris Olympics 2024. Myanmar has never won a single medal in its history of Olympic games.

== Competitors ==
The following is the list of number of competitors in the Games.

Sport	Men	Women	Total
Badminton	0	1	1
Swimming	1	0	1
Total	1	1	2

== Badminton ==
Myanmar entered one badminton player into the Olympic tournament. Tokyo 2020 Olympian Thet Htar Thuzar secured her spot through the release of the final BWF Road to Paris 2024 ranking.

Athlete	Event	Group stage			Elimination	Quarter-final	Semi-final	Final / BM	
Athlete	Event	Opposition Score	Opposition Score	Rank	Opposition Score	Opposition Score	Opposition Score	Opposition Score	Rank
Thet Htar Thuzar	Women's singles	Yamaguchi (JPN); L (12–21, 10–21)	Li (CAN); L (16–21, 23–25)	3	Did not advance				

== Swimming ==
For the first time since the nation's last participation in 2016, Myanmar sent one swimmer to compete at the 2024 Paris Olympics.

Athlete	Event	Heat		Semifinal		Final	
Athlete	Event	Time	Rank	Time	Rank	Time	Rank
Phone Pyae Han	Men's 100 m freestyle	55.56	73	Did not advance			
