= Burma at the 1988 Summer Olympics =

- IOC code: BIR

in Seoul
- Competitors: 2 women in 1 sport
- Officials: 3
- Medals: Gold 0 Silver 0 Bronze 0 Total 0

Summer Olympics appearances (overview)
- 1948; 1952; 1956; 1960; 1964; 1968; 1972; 1976; 1980; 1984; 1988; 1992; 1996; 2000; 2004; 2008; 2012; 2016; 2020; 2024

Burma was represented at the 1988 Summer Olympics in Seoul, South Korea by the Burma Olympic Committee.

In total, two athletes – both women – represented Burma in one sport: athletics.

A military coup occurred in Burma during 8888 Uprising, the day after the opening ceremony. Burma's athletes competed nonetheless, but the country was then absent from the 1988 Summer Paralympics, held just after the Olympics.

== Background ==
The 1988 Summer Olympics in Seoul, South Korea took place amidst civil unrest in Burma. Student protests peaked in August 1988 and culminated in the 8888 Uprising on 8 August 1988. A military coup d'état occurred on 18 September 1988, the day after the opening ceremony.

== Competitors ==
In total, two athletes represented Burma at the 1988 Summer Olympics in Seoul, South Korea in one sport: athletics.

Sport	Men	Women	Total
Athletics	0	2	2
Total	0	2	2

== Athletics ==
In total, two Burmese athletes participated in the athletics events – Khin Khin Htwe in the women's 1,500 m and the women's 3,000 m and Mar Mar Min in the women's 10,000 m and the women's marathon.

The heats for the women's 3,000 m took place on 23 September 1988. Khin Khin Htwe finished 14th in her heat in a time of nine minutes 26.57 seconds and she did not advance to the final.

The women's marathon took place on 23 September 1988. Mar Mar Min did not finish.

The heats for the women's 10,000 m took place on 26 September 1988. Mar Mar Min did not start.

The heats for the women's 1,500 m took place on 29 September 1988. Khin Khin Htwe finished 11th in her heat in a time of four minutes 20.92 seconds and she did not advance to the final.

Athlete	Event	Heat		Quarterfinal		Semifinal		Final	
Athlete	Event	Result	Rank	Result	Rank	Result	Rank	Result	Rank
Khin Khin Htwe	1,500 m	4:20.92	23	Did not advance					
Khin Khin Htwe	3,000 m	9:26.57	29	Did not advance					
Mar Mar Min	10,000 m	DNS		Did not advance					
Mar Mar Min	Marathon	—						DNF	

== Aftermath ==
Although the country competed at the 1988 Summer Olympics, Burma was absent from the 1988 Summer Paralympics which were also held in Seoul, South Korea.
