= Burma at the 1972 Summer Olympics =

- IOC code: BIR

in Munich
- Competitors: 18 (men) in 4 sports
- Flag bearer: Win Maung (Football)
- Medals: Gold 0 Silver 0 Bronze 0 Total 0

Summer Olympics appearances (overview)
- 1948; 1952; 1956; 1960; 1964; 1968; 1972; 1976; 1980; 1984; 1988; 1992; 1996; 2000; 2004; 2008; 2012; 2016; 2020; 2024

Burma competed at the 1972 Summer Olympics in Munich, West Germany.

== Athletics ==
Men
Track & road events

Athlete	Event	Heat		Quarterfinal		Semifinal		Final	
Athlete	Event	Result	Rank	Result	Rank	Result	Rank	Result	Rank
Jimmy Crampton	800 m	1:54.2	53	Did not advance					
Jimmy Crampton	1500 m	4:06.9	63	Did not advance					
Hla Thein	Marathon	—						2:48:53	57

== Boxing ==
Men

Athlete	Event	1 Round	2 Round	Quarterfinals	Semifinals	Final	
Athlete	Event	Opposition Result	Opposition Result	Opposition Result	Opposition Result	Opposition Result	Rank
Vanlal Dawla	Flyweight	BYE	Boris Zoriktuyev (URS); L TKO-3	did not advance			

== Football ==
=== First round ===
==== Group B ====
Team	Pld	W	D	L	GF	GA	GD	Pts
Soviet Union	3	3	0	0	7	2	+5	6
Mexico	3	2	0	1	3	4	-1	4
Burma	3	1	0	2	2	2	0	2
Sudan	3	0	0	3	1	5	−4	0

28 August 1972
12:00

Soviet Union	1 – 0	Burma
Kolotov 51'	Report

Regensburg
Attendance: 6.000
Referee: Jafar Namdar (Iran)

30 August 1972
12:00

Mexico	1 – 0	Burma
Cuéllar 86'	Report

Nuremberg
Attendance: 1.000
Referee: Robert Quarshie (Ghana)

1 September 1972
12:00

Burma	2 – 0	Sudan
Soe Than 7'; Aung Moe Thin 61'	Report

Passau
Attendance: 2.000
Referee: Marian Srodecki (Poland)
- Team Roster

Burma - 9th place

- Aye I Maung
- Aye II Maung
- Khin Maung Lay
- Maung Maung Tin
- Myint Kyu
- Myo Win Nyunt
- San Aye
- Than Soe
- Tin Aung
- Tin Aung Moe
- Tin Sein
- Win Maung
- Ye Nyunt

== Weightlifting ==
Men

Athlete	Event	Military press		Snatch		Clean & Jerk		Total	Rank
Athlete	Event	Result	Rank	Result	Rank	Result	Rank	Total	Rank
Gyi Aung Maung	52 kg	95.0	11	105.0 WR	1	120.0	7	320.0	5
