= Shooting at the 2006 Asian Games – Men's 10 metre air pistol team =

Men's 10 metre air pistol team at the 2006 Asian Games
- Venue: Lusail Shooting Range
- Dates: 3 December 2006
- Competitors: 42 from 14 nations

Medalists
gold medal	China; Lin Zhongzai, Pang Wei, Tan Zongliang
silver medal	South Korea; Jin Jong-oh, Kim Young-wook, Lee Dae-myung
bronze medal	Vietnam; Hoàng Xuân Vinh, Nguyễn Mạnh Tường, Trần Quốc Cường

The men's 10 metre air pistol team competition at the 2006 Asian Games in Doha, Qatar was held on 3 December at the Lusail Shooting Range.

== Schedule ==
All times are Arabia Standard Time (UTC+03:00)

Date	Time	Event
Sunday, 3 December 2006	08:00	Final

== Records ==
Prior to this competition, the existing world, Asian and Games records were as follows.

World Record	China	1756	Langkawi, Malaysia	27 January 2000
Asian Record	China	1756	Langkawi, Malaysia	27 January 2000
Games Record	China	1750	Busan, South Korea	3 October 2002

== Results ==
Rank	Team	Series						Total	Notes
Rank	Team	1	2	3	4	5	6	Total	Notes
1st place, gold medalist(s)	China (CHN)	292	289	288	291	291	293	1744	
	Lin Zhongzai	96	96	97	98	99	96	582	
	Pang Wei	98	94	93	95	95	99	574	
	Tan Zongliang	98	99	98	98	97	98	588	
2nd place, silver medalist(s)	South Korea (KOR)	292	288	289	293	290	287	1739	
	Jin Jong-oh	95	98	98	99	97	96	583	
	Kim Young-wook	98	93	94	97	96	96	574	
	Lee Dae-myung	99	97	97	97	97	95	582	
3rd place, bronze medalist(s)	Vietnam (VIE)	288	284	290	292	286	290	1730	
	Hoàng Xuân Vinh	97	92	96	98	95	97	575	
	Nguyễn Mạnh Tường	97	96	95	97	94	98	577	
	Trần Quốc Cường	94	96	99	97	97	95	578	
4	North Korea (PRK)	286	289	292	288	289	285	1729	
	Kim Hyon-ung	96	94	99	95	94	93	571	
	Kim Jong-su	96	100	98	95	99	96	584	
	Ryu Myong-yon	94	95	95	98	96	96	574	
5	Japan (JPN)	290	284	288	288	289	286	1725	
	Teruyoshi Akiyama	99	92	95	95	96	96	573	
	Tomohiro Kida	94	96	96	95	97	95	573	
	Susumu Kobayashi	97	96	97	98	96	95	579	
6	Kazakhstan (KAZ)	282	289	288	290	287	283	1719	
	Lev Berner	92	97	92	96	95	92	564	
	Vladimir Issachenko	94	95	97	97	96	96	575	
	Rashid Yunusmetov	96	97	99	97	96	95	580	
7	India (IND)	287	288	279	287	285	286	1712	
	Samaresh Jung	94	97	97	95	96	97	576	
	Ronak Pandit	97	95	90	95	93	95	565	
	Deepak Sharma	96	96	92	97	96	94	571	
8	Chinese Taipei (TPE)	279	283	285	289	288	283	1707	
	Chang Yi-ning	92	91	94	98	98	93	566	
	Liao Chi-ming	93	96	96	94	96	95	570	
	Wu Kuo-yang	94	96	95	97	94	95	571	
9	Thailand (THA)	287	282	287	282	284	281	1703	
	Jakkrit Panichpatikum	98	94	99	95	96	94	576	
	Bhawin Tantinvachai	95	95	91	93	95	94	563	
	Saran Wongehiaosiri	94	93	97	94	93	93	564	
10	Iran (IRI)	278	276	284	286	278	281	1683	
	Ebrahim Barkhordari	92	94	92	94	89	95	556	
	Hossein Hosseini	91	94	95	96	95	91	562	
	Mohsen Nasr Esfahani	95	88	97	96	94	95	565	
11	Tajikistan (TJK)	272	283	278	281	283	280	1677	
	Sergey Babikov	92	95	94	95	96	95	567	
	Oleg Nabiev	90	93	92	96	95	93	559	
	Fahriddin Sirodjiddinov	90	95	92	90	92	92	551	
12	Bahrain (BRN)	276	278	282	284	279	273	1672	
	Abdulmajed Abdulkhaliq	90	91	91	96	92	93	553	
	Khalid Ahmed Mohamed	93	93	96	97	92	91	562	
	Ashban Sulaiman	93	94	95	91	95	89	557	
13	Saudi Arabia (KSA)	277	276	281	276	274	285	1669	
	Saleh Al-Anazi	92	90	93	90	87	91	543	
	Ayedh Al-Malki	92	94	93	91	94	94	558	
	Hadi Al-Qahtani	93	92	95	95	93	100	568	
14	Qatar (QAT)	279	273	272	272	274	287	1657	
	Shaker Al-Burti	93	90	90	88	92	97	550	
	Mohammed Al-Fakih	93	88	95	93	92	97	558	
	Abdulla Al-Naemi	93	95	87	91	90	93	549	
