= Myanmar at the 2012 Summer Paralympics =

- IPC code: MYA
- NPC: National Paralympic Committee of Myanmar

in London
- Competitors: 2 in 2 sports
- Medals: Gold 0 Silver 0 Bronze 0 Total 0

Summer Paralympics appearances (overview)
- 1976; 1980; 1984; 1988; 1992; 1996–2004; 2008; 2012; 2016; 2020; 2024

Myanmar competed at the 2012 Summer Paralympics in London, United Kingdom from August 29 to September 9, 2012.

== Athletics ==
Men's Field Events

Athlete	Event	Distance	Points	Rank
Naing Win	Javelin Throw F57-58	29.91	589	14

== Swimming ==
Men

Athletes	Event	Heat		Final	
Athletes	Event	Time	Rank	Time	Rank
Sit Aung Naing	100m backstroke S6	1:27.00	9	did not advance	
Sit Aung Naing	50m butterfly S6	35.41	9	did not advance	

== See also ==
- Myanmar at the 2012 Summer Olympics
