= Myanmar at the 2008 Summer Paralympics =

- IPC code: MYA
- NPC: National Paralympic Committee of Myanmar

in Beijing
- Competitors: 3 in 2 sports
- Flag bearer: Win Naing
- Medals: Gold 0 Silver 0 Bronze 0 Total 0

Summer Paralympics appearances (overview)
- 1976; 1980; 1984; 1988; 1992; 1996–2004; 2008; 2012; 2016; 2020; 2024

Myanmar competed at the 2008 Summer Paralympics in Beijing, China. The country's delegation consisted of three competitors: swimmers Win San Aung and Naing Sit Aung and athlete Win Naing. Both Naing Sit Aung and Win Naing won three gold medals at the ASEAN ParaGames earlier in 2008.

== Sports ==
=== Athletics ===
Athlete	Class	Event	Final		
Athlete	Class	Event	Result	Points	Rank
Win Naing	F57-58	Men's javelin throw	33.33	859	12

=== Swimming ===
==== Men ====
Athlete	Class	Event	Heats		Final	
Athlete	Class	Event	Result	Rank	Result	Rank
Win San Aung	SB5	100m breaststroke	1:54.51	12	did not advance	
Naing Sit Aung	S6	100m backstroke	1:30.75	9	did not advance	
Naing Sit Aung	S6	50m butterfly	38.13	12	did not advance	
Naing Sit Aung	SM6	200m individual medley	3:39.32	11	did not advance	

== See also ==
- Myanmar at the Paralympics
- Myanmar at the 2008 Summer Olympics
