= Burma at the 1960 Summer Olympics =

- IOC code: BIR

in Rome
- Competitors: 10 in 5 sports
- Medals: Gold 0 Silver 0 Bronze 0 Total 0

Summer Olympics appearances (overview)
- 1948; 1952; 1956; 1960; 1964; 1968; 1972; 1976; 1980; 1984; 1988; 1992; 1996; 2000; 2004; 2008; 2012; 2016; 2020; 2024

Burma competed at the 1960 Summer Olympics in Rome, Italy.

== Athletics ==
Men
Track & road events

Athlete	Event	Heat		Quarterfinal		Semifinal		Final	
Athlete	Event	Result	Rank	Result	Rank	Result	Rank	Result	Rank
Myitung Naw	Marathon	—						2:28:17.0	27

== Boxing ==
Men

Athlete	Event	1 Round	2 Round	3 Round	Quarterfinals	Semifinals	Final
Athlete	Event	Opposition Result	Opposition Result	Opposition Result	Opposition Result	Opposition Result	Rank
Hla Nyunt	Flyweight	BYE	Borje Karvonen (FIN); W 4-1	Humberto Barrera (USA); L 2-3	did not advance		
Thein Myint	Bantamweight	BYE	Charles Reiff (LUX); W 5-0	Muhammad Nasir (PAK); W 5-0	Oleg Grigoryev (URS); L WO	did not advance	5
Than Tun	Featherweight	William Meyers (RSA); L 0-5	did not advance				

== Sailing ==
Open

Athlete	Event	Race							Net points	Final rank
Athlete	Event	1	2	3	4	5	6	7	Net points	Final rank
Lwin U Maung Maung	Finn	27	23	30	~~34~~	31	30	15	1456	30
Gyi Khin Pe; Chow Park Wing	Flying Dutchman	27	27	29	27	24	~~DNS~~	28	970	29

== Swimming ==
Men

Athlete	Event	Heat		Semifinal		Final	
Athlete	Event	Time	Rank	Time	Rank	Time	Rank
Tin Maung Ni	Men's 1500 m freestyle	19:09.8	20	did not advance			

== Weightlifting ==
Men

Athlete	Event	Military press		Snatch		Clean & Jerk		Total	Rank
Athlete	Event	Result	Rank	Result	Rank	Result	Rank	Total	Rank
Tun Maung Kywe	60 kg	100,0	7	100,0	7	127,5	10	327,5	7
Nil Tun Maung	67.5 kg	117,5	2	~~110,0~~	DNF	—	—	—	DNF
