= Myanmar at the Paralympics =

- IPC code: MYA
- NPC: Myanmar Paralympic Sports Federation
- Medals: Gold 2 Silver 3 Bronze 2 Total 7

Summer appearances
- 1976; 1980; 1984; 1988; 1992; 1996–2004; 2008; 2012; 2016; 2020; 2024

Myanmar has been a sporadic participant in the Paralympic Games. It first competed, as Burma, at the 1976 Summer Paralympics in Toronto, with a delegation in track and field and shooting. These athletes were fairly successful, Tin Ngwe becoming Burma's first Paralympic champion by winning the men's 100m sprint in the C1 category. Aung Than won silver in the same event, while Tin Win took bronze in the men's 100m in category C. Burma was absent from the 1980 Games, returning in 1984 to take part in volleyball and track and field. Tin Ngwe, in category A3, won gold in the men's high jump, and silver in the long jump, while Aung Gyi won silver and bronze, respectively, in those same two events. In both Burma's appearances in the Paralympics, it fielded all-male delegations.

Following the 8888 Uprising in August 1988, and the military coup which established the State Peace and Development Council in September, Burma was absent from the 1988 Summer Paralympics, held in October. The country's name was officially changed to Myanmar. As it also changed its IPC country code from BIR to MYA and the International Paralympic Committee being established only in 1989, the International Paralympic Committee maintains separate records for "Burma" and "Myanmar".

Myanmar, as such, made its Paralympic début at the 1992 Summer Paralympics in Barcelona. Myanmar's delegation to the Barcelona Games consisted in a single athlete (Kyaw Khaing) to compete in sprinting. He finished last in both his races. The country was then absent for three consecutive editions of the Summer Paralympics, before returning to the Paralympics in 2008, with a male competitor in javelin (Win Naing), and two male swimmers (Naing Sit Aung and Win San Aung). The country withdrew from the 2020 games for unspecified reasons.

They all ranked low in their respective events. "Myanmar" has thus fielded smaller, less successful delegations than "Burma".

Although "Burma" had won a total of seven medals (two gold, three silver, two bronze), no athlete has ever won a Paralympic medal for "Myanmar". The country has never taken part in the Winter Paralympics, in either form.

== Medal summary ==
Games	Gold	Silver	Bronze	Total
1976 Toronto	1	1	1	3
1984 New York Stoke Mandeville	1	2	1	4
1992 Barcelona/Madrid	0	0	0	0
2008 Beijing	0	0	0	0
2012 London	0	0	0	0
2016 Rio de Janeiro	0	0	0	0
Totals (6 entries)	2	3	2	7

== Medallists ==
Medal	Name	Sports	Event	Year
(gold) Gold	Tin Ngwe	Athletics	100 m C1	1976
(gold) Gold	Tin Ngwe	Athletics	High jump A3	1984
(silver) Silver	Tin Ngwe	Athletics	Long jump A3	1984
(silver) Silver	Aung Than	Athletics	100 m C1	1976
(silver) Silver	Aung Gyi	Athletics	High jump A3	1984
(bronze) Silver	Aung Gyi	Athletics	Long jump A3	1984
(bronze) Bronze	Tin Win	Athletics	100m C	1976

Medals by sports
Sports	1st place, gold medalist(s)	2nd place, silver medalist(s)	3rd place, bronze medalist(s)	Total
Athletics	2	3	2	7
Total	2	3	2	7

== See also ==
- Myanmar at the Olympics
- Myanmar at the Asian Games
- Myanmar at the Asian Para Games
- Myanmar at the Southeast Asian Games
