= Burma at the 1948 Summer Olympics =

- IOC code: BIR

in London
- Competitors: 5 in 3 sports
- Medals: Gold 0 Silver 0 Bronze 0 Total 0

Summer Olympics appearances (overview)
- 1948; 1952; 1956; 1960; 1964; 1968; 1972; 1976; 1980; 1984; 1988; 1992; 1996; 2000; 2004; 2008; 2012; 2016; 2020; 2024

Burma competed in the Summer Olympic Games for the first time at the 1948 Summer Olympics in London, England.

== Athletics ==
Men
Track & road events

| Athlete | Event | Heat | | Quarterfinal | | Semifinal | | Final | |
| Athlete | Event | Result | Rank | Result | Rank | Result | Rank | Result | Rank |
|---|---|---|---|---|---|---|---|---|---|
| Maung Sein Pe | 100 m | 11.68 | 6 | Did not advance | | | | | |
| Maung Sein Pe | 200 m | NT | 4 | Did not advance | | | | | |

== Boxing ==
Men

| Athlete | Event | 1 Round | 2 Round | Quarterfinals | Semifinals | Final | |
| Athlete | Event | Opposition Result | Opposition Result | Opposition Result | Opposition Result | Opposition Result | Rank |
|---|---|---|---|---|---|---|---|
| Maung Myo Thant | Flyweight | Joey Sandulo (CAN); W PTS | Appie Corman (NED); L RSC-3 | Did not advance | | | |
| Saw Hardy | Bantamweight | Albert Perera (CEY); L RSC2 | Did not advance | | | | |

== Weightlifting ==
Men

| Athlete | Event | Military press | | Snatch | | Clean & jerk | | Total | Rank |
| Athlete | Event | Result | Rank | Result | Rank | Result | Rank | Total | Rank |
|---|---|---|---|---|---|---|---|---|---|
| Maung Win Maung | 56 kg | 82.5 | 5 | 82.5 | 12 | 100.0 | 15 | 265.0 | 15 |
