= Zaw Win Thet =

Burmese sprinter

Personal information
- Born: March 1, 1991 (age 35)
- Height: 1.62 m (5 ft 4 in)
- Weight: 55 kg (121 lb)

Sport
- Country: Myanmar
- Sport: Athletics
- Event: 400m

Zaw Win Thet (born 1 March 1991 in Kyonpyaw, Pathein District, Ayeyarwady Division, Myanmar) is a Burmese runner who competed in the 400 m event at the 2012 Summer Olympics. He was the flag bearer of Myanmar sports team at the opening ceremony.

Olympic Games
Preceded by Phone Myint Tayzar	Flagbearer for Myanmar; London 2012	Succeeded by Yan Naing Soe
