= Burma at the 1968 Summer Olympics =

- IOC code: BIR

in Mexico City
- Competitors: 4 in 2 sports
- Medals: Gold 0 Silver 0 Bronze 0 Total 0

Summer Olympics appearances (overview)
- 1948; 1952; 1956; 1960; 1964; 1968; 1972; 1976; 1980; 1984; 1988; 1992; 1996; 2000; 2004; 2008; 2012; 2016; 2020; 2024

Burma competed at the 1968 Summer Olympics in Mexico City, Mexico. They fielded four competitors, all men.

== Athletics ==
Men
Track & road events

Athlete	Event	Heat		Quarterfinal		Semifinal		Final	
Athlete	Event	Result	Rank	Result	Rank	Result	Rank	Result	Rank
Thin Sumbwegam	Marathon	—						2:32:22.0	18
Hla Thein	Marathon	—						2:54:03.6	47

== Boxing ==
Men

Athlete	Event	1 Round	2 Round	Quarterfinals	Semifinals	Final	
Athlete	Event	Opposition Result	Opposition Result	Opposition Result	Opposition Result	Opposition Result	Rank
Lay Thet	Light-Flyweight	BYE	Hatha Karunaratne (CEY); L 0-5	did not advance			
Tin Tun	Lightweight	BYE	Luis Minami (PER); L TKO-2	did not advance			
