= Hoàng Xuân Vinh =

Vietnamese sport shooter (born 1974)

Hoàng Xuân Vinh OLY
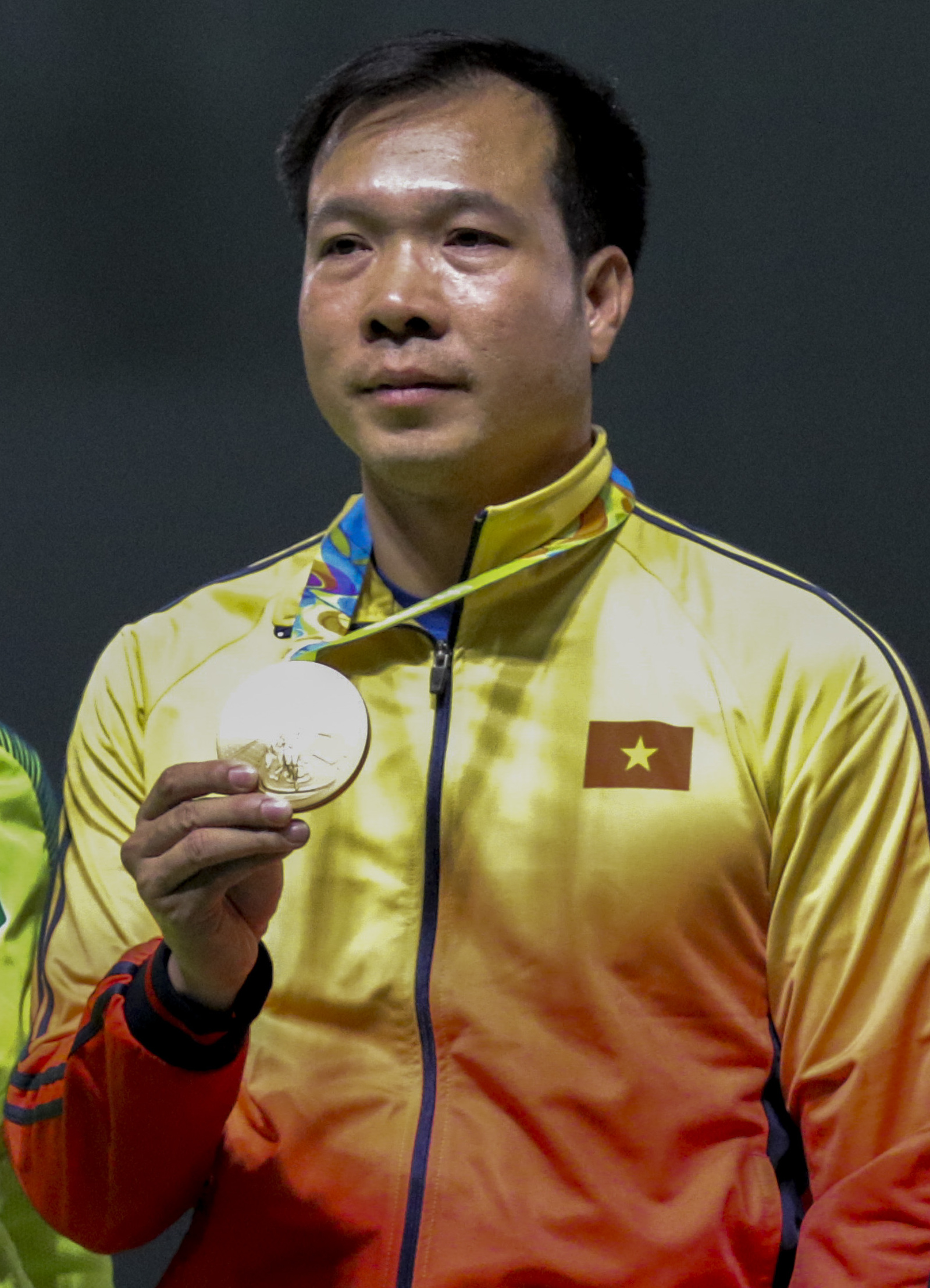
- Xuân Vinh with Vietnam's first Olympic gold medal in 2016

Personal information
- Nationality: Vietnam
- Born: 6 October 1974 (age 51) Sơn Tây, Hà Tây province, North Vietnam
- Height: 1.75 m (5 ft 9 in)
- Weight: 75 kg (165 lb)

Sport
- Sport: Shooting
- Events: 10 meter air pistol (AP60); 50 meter pistol (FP)
- Coached by: Nguyễn Thị Nhung
Medal record
Representing Vietnam
Men's shooting
Summer Olympics
Gold medal – first place	2016 Rio de Janeiro	10 m air pistol
Silver medal – second place	2016 Rio de Janeiro	50 m pistol
ISSF World Cup
Gold medal – first place	2013 Changwon	10 m air pistol
Gold medal – first place	2014 Fort Benning	10 m air pistol
Silver medal – second place	2015 Munich	50 m pistol
Silver medal – second place	2017 New Delhi	10 m air pistol
Bronze medal – third place	2015 Changwon	50 m pistol
Bronze medal – third place	2015 Fort Benning	50 m pistol
Bronze medal – third place	2016 Bangkok	10 m air pistol
Bronze medal – third place	2016 Munich	10 m air pistol
Asian Games
Bronze medal – third place	2006 Doha	10 m air pistol team
Bronze medal – third place	2014 Incheon	50 m pistol team
Asian Championships
Gold medal – first place	2012 Nanchang	10 m air pistol
Silver medal – second place	2012 Doha	25 m center fire pistol team
Bronze medal – third place	2015 Kuwait City	Men's 10 m Air Pistol Team
Bronze medal – third place	2012 Doha	25 m center fire pistol
Bronze medal – third place	2012 Doha	10 m air pistol
Bronze medal – third place	2012 Nanchang	10 m air pistol team
Southeast Asian Games
Gold medal – first place	2007 Nakhon Ratchasima	25 m cantre fire pistol
Gold medal – first place	2011 Palembang	10 m air pistol
Gold medal – first place	2011 Palembang	25 m center fire pistol
Gold medal – first place	2013 Naypyidaw	10 m air pistol
Gold medal – first place	2013 Naypyidaw	10 m air pistol team
Gold medal – first place	2013 Naypyidaw	50 m free pistol team
Gold medal – first place	2015 Singapore	10 m air pistol team
Gold medal – first place	2015 Singapore	50 m pistol
Silver medal – second place	2011 Palembang	50 m free pistol
Silver medal – second place	2015 Singapore	50 m free pistol team
Bronze medal – third place	2005 Manila	10 m air pistol
Bronze medal – third place	2007 Nakhon Ratchasima	10 m standard pistol
Bronze medal – third place	2015 Singapore	10 m air pistol

Hoàng Xuân Vinh (born 6 October 1974) is a Vietnamese sport shooter. Xuân Vinh participated in the 2012, 2016 and 2020 Summer Olympics. He won a gold medal in the 10 meter air pistol and a silver in the 50 meter pistol competitions at the 2016 Summer Olympics, becoming the first-ever and currently only athlete from Vietnam to win an Olympic gold medal.

== Early life ==
Hoàng Xuân Vinh was born in Sơn Tây. His father was a soldier and his mother was a factory worker; his mother passed away when he was just three years old, and after her passing, Xuân Vinh, along with his younger sister who was a toddler, moved with their father to the capital in Hanoi, where they lived in a small apartment building. Due to the family's modest circumstances, Xuân Vinh's father could not provide much for the two children. After finishing high school, Xuân Vinh volunteered to join the military. He attended the Military Engineering Officer School in Sông Bé province, spending nearly two years training at the Army Officer School 2.

== Career ==
=== Beginnings in professional shooting ===
Unlike most shooters, Hoàng Xuân Vinh began his professional shooting career relatively late. In 1994, after graduating from the Engineer Officer School, he was posted to the 239th Engineer Brigade based in Thường Tín Ha Tay province. During his time in the military, he was known to be a very skilled marksman, and was frequently sent to participate in various shooting competitions, often achieving good results and bringing prestige for his unit.

In 1998, at the national military shooting competition, he secured first place. Consequently, in 1999, the Army Club requested to recruit him. He was called up to the national team at the age of 26, officially leaving his position as a commanding officer. In the same year, Hoàng Xuân Vinh won his first medal as a professional athlete, a bronze in the team event at the 1999 National Cup in the men's air pistol category held in Hai Phong.

In 2000, he won the gold medal and set a national record in the men's 10m air pistol event with a score of 580 points, becoming a national team member. For six consecutive SEA Games from 2001 to 2011, Xuân Vinh won at least one gold medal every year.

== Southeast Asian Games ==
Hoàng Xuân Vinh won his first team gold medal at the 2001 SEA Games in Malaysia. At the 2003 SEA Games in Vietnam, he secured another gold medal in the men's team air pistol event. During the 2007 SEA Games in Thailand, he won two individual gold medals and one team gold in the men's 10m air pistol and 25m revolver events. He became the most successful shooter on the Vietnamese team at that game, winning three gold medals and leading in individual achievements. At the 2011 SEA Games in Indonesia, he won one gold in the men's 10m air pistol, another gold in the 25m revolver event, and a silver medal.

At the 2017 SEA Games, his win streak ended and Hoàng Xuân Vinh failed to win a medal, being eliminated on his 14th shot.

== Asian Games ==
Hoàng Xuân Vinh joined the national team for the Asian Games (ASIAD) starting in 2006. At the 2006 Asian Games, he and his teammates secured a bronze in the men's team 10m air pistol event.

During the 2010 Asian Games, while competing in the 25m revolver event, he performed excellently in the slow-fire round, leading the scoreboard. However, in the rapid-fire round, his nerves got the best of him, leading to a crucial mistake on the final shot, causing him to drop from first place to 13th overall. His team also failed to secure any medals in the team event.

== 2012 Summer Olympics ==
Hoàng Xuân Vinh secured a spot at the 2012 Summer Olympics at the 2012 Asian Championship in Qatar. In this competition, he placed fourth in the men's 10m air pistol event. Since the three athletes above him had already qualified for the Olympics through previous competitions, Hoàng Xuân Vinh earned a spot, becoming the first Vietnamese shooter to qualify for the Olympics by passing the qualification rounds.

In London, Hoàng Xuân Vinh competed in two events: the 10m air pistol and the 50m free pistol. In the 10m air pistol event, he scored 582 points in the qualifying round, just one point short of making it to the finals.

In the 50m free pistol event, Hoàng Xuân Vinh ranked fourth in the qualifying round with 563 points, securing a place among the eight shooters advancing to the final round. During the medal-deciding final, he remained in the group of potential medalists after consistently scoring above 10 points in rounds 3, 6, 7, and 8. However, a dramatic twist occurred in the 9th shot when he needed only 8 points to secure a medal, but the Hanoi-born shooter managed only 7.3 points. As a result, even though his final shot scored 10.2 points, finishing the final round with 95.5 points and a total score of 658.5 points, Hoàng Xuân Vinh still fell short of the bronze medal by 0.1 points, which went to Wang Zhiwei.

== 2012 Asian Air Gun Championship ==
In December 2012, at the Asian Air Gun Championship in China, Hoàng Xuân Vinh competed in the men's 10m air pistol. In the qualifying round, he scored 583 points. He performed outstandingly in the finals, scoring 100.3 points and securing the gold medal with a total of 683.3 points. This marked the first Asian gold medal for a Vietnamese shooter at the event. He also contributed to a team bronze medal in this event.

== 2013 International Shooting Sport Federation World Cup ==
At the 2013 ISSF World Cup in South Korea, Hoàng Xuân Vinh competed in the men's 10m air pistol event, facing his rival, Wang Zhiwei, who had narrowly beaten him at the 2012 Olympics. In the qualifiers, Xuân Vinh ranked second with 583 points. In the finals, he maintained his focus and consistency, scoring 200.8 points to win his first-ever World Cup gold medal for Vietnam, finishing 0.7 points ahead of Wang.

== 2016 Summer Olympics ==
At the 2016 Summer Olympics in Rio de Janeiro, Brazil, Hoàng Xuân Vinh made history by winning the first-ever Olympic gold medal for Vietnam in the men's 10 metre air pistol event, defeating Brazil's Felipe Almeida Wu. His final score of 202.5 points set a new Olympic record since the ISSF changed the event format in 2013.

In the dramatic final, the gold medal was decided in the last two shots. Despite trailing before the last shot, Xuân Vinh focused intensely and scored 10.7 points, narrowly surpassing Almeida Wu to win the gold medal.

This gold medal was a historic achievement as it marked Vietnam's first Olympic gold. During the final rounds of the 10m air pistol competition, the tension reached its peak in the last two shots as it became a head-to-head battle for the gold medal between Xuân Vinh and Almeida Wu, after all other competitors were directly eliminated. Before the penultimate shot, Xuân Vinh's total score was 182.6, while Almeida Wu's was 181.8. In that round, Xuân Vinh did not perform well, scoring only 9.2 compared to his opponent's 10.2, dropping to second place by 0.2 points.

In the decisive final shot, it seemed as though Xuân Vinh would once again bitterly finish second as Almeida Wu quickly executed his last shot with a solid score of 10.1, earning cheers from the home crowd. Xuân Vinh, however, took his time, focusing intently on his target before spectacularly scoring 10.7, hitting just near the bullseye. This incredible performance allowed him to claim the gold medal amid the respectful applause of his host-nation opponent, as Xuân Vinh could not hold back tears of happiness.

The gold medal in the 10m air pistol event that Xuân Vinh won at the 2016 Summer Olympics held historical significance for domestic sports because it was Vietnam's first-ever Olympic gold medal.

Later, on 10 August, he went on to win a silver medal in the men's 50 metre pistol event with a total score of 191.3, finishing behind Jin Jong-oh of South Korea, who scored 193.7.

== Personal life ==
In 2000, Hoàng Xuân Vinh married Phan Hương Giang. The couple has a daughter and a son. Despite being a shooter, he is severely nearsighted. Xuân Vinh's idol is Trần Oanh, a legendary Vietnamese shooter of the past.

In 2012, he was promoted to the rank of colonel in the Vietnam People's Army. That same year, Xuân Vinh ranked third in the list of Vietnam's top 10 athletes. In 2013, he again ranked third in the selection of the top 10 athletes. With his historic gold medal and silver medal at the Rio 2016 Olympics, Xuân Vinh was voted "Outstanding Athlete" in Vietnamese sports in 2016 with a total of 2,020 points.
