= Burma at the 1980 Summer Olympics =

- IOC code: BIR

in Moscow
- Competitors: 2 in 2 sports
- Flag bearer: Myint Sann
- Officials: 1
- Medals: Gold 0 Silver 0 Bronze 0 Total 0

Summer Olympics appearances (overview)
- 1948; 1952; 1956; 1960; 1964; 1968; 1972; 1976; 1980; 1984; 1988; 1992; 1996; 2000; 2004; 2008; 2012; 2016; 2020; 2024

Burma competed at the 1980 Summer Olympics in Moscow, USSR. The South Asian nation returned the Olympic Games after boycotting the 1976 Summer Olympics.

== Athletics ==
Men
Track & road events

Athlete	Event	Heat		Quarterfinal		Semifinal		Final	
Athlete	Event	Result	Rank	Result	Rank	Result	Rank	Result	Rank
Soe Khin	Marathon	—						2:41:41	47

== Weightlifting ==
Men

Athlete	Event	Snatch		Clean & Jerk		Total	Rank
Athlete	Event	Result	Rank	Result	Rank	Total	Rank
Myint Sann	90 kg	~~125~~	DNF	—	—	—	DNF
