= Zaw Weik =

Burmese weightlifter (1911–2000)

Personal information
- Native name: ဇော်ဝိတ်
- Nationality: Indian (till 1937); Burmese
- Born: 7 March 1911 Kawhmu, Burma, British India
- Died: 25 November 2000 (aged 89) Yangon, Myanmar

Sport
- Sport: Weightlifting

Zaw Weik (7 March 1911 – 25 November 2000) was a Burmese weightlifter who represented India. He competed in the men's middleweight event at the 1936 Summer Olympics, he was the first Burmese athlete to take part in the Olympics. In 1946, he formed the Burma Olympic Committee.
