= San Aye =

Burmese footballer

Personal information
- Date of birth: 20 June 1954 (age 72)

Senior career*
Years	Team	Apps	(Gls)
- Construction Corporation

International career
- Myanmar
- * Club domestic league appearances and goals

San Aye (born 20 June 1954) is a Burmese footballer. He competed in the men's tournament at the 1972 Summer Olympics.
