= Burma at the 1952 Summer Olympics =

- IOC code: BIR

in Helsinki
- Competitors: 5 in 2 sports
- Medals: Gold 0 Silver 0 Bronze 0 Total 0

Summer Olympics appearances (overview)
- 1948; 1952; 1956; 1960; 1964; 1968; 1972; 1976; 1980; 1984; 1988; 1992; 1996; 2000; 2004; 2008; 2012; 2016; 2020; 2024

Burma competed at the 1952 Summer Olympics in Helsinki, Finland.

== Boxing ==
Men

| Athlete | Event | 1 Round | 2 Round | Quarterfinals | Semifinals | Final | |
| Athlete | Event | Opposition Result | Opposition Result | Opposition Result | Opposition Result | Opposition Result | Rank |
|---|---|---|---|---|---|---|---|
| Basil Thompson | Flyweight | Al Asuncion (PHI); L TKO-2 | did not advance | | | | |
| Kyar Ba Nyein | Featherweight | Lech Drogosz (POL); L 0-3 | did not advance | | | | |
| Stanley Majid | Light-welterweight | BYE | Erkki Aarno Mallenius (FIN); L TKO-3 | did not advance | | | |

== Weightlifting ==
Men

| Athlete | Event | Military press | | Snatch | | Clean & Jerk | | Total | Rank |
| Athlete | Event | Result | Rank | Result | Rank | Result | Rank | Total | Rank |
|---|---|---|---|---|---|---|---|---|---|
| Nil Tun Maung | 60 kg | 90.0 | 7 | 87.5 | 17 | 117.5 | 14 | 295.0 | 14 |
| Nil Kyaw Yin | 67.5 kg | 87.5 | 21 | 97.5 | 15 | 125.0 | 11 | 310.0 | 14 |
