= Burma at the 1964 Summer Olympics =

- IOC code: BIR (BUR used at these Games)

in Tokyo
- Competitors: 11 in 5 sports
- Medals: Gold 0 Silver 0 Bronze 0 Total 0

Summer Olympics appearances (overview)
- 1948; 1952; 1956; 1960; 1964; 1968; 1972; 1976; 1980; 1984; 1988; 1992; 1996; 2000; 2004; 2008; 2012; 2016; 2020; 2024

Burma competed at the 1964 Summer Olympics in Tokyo, Japan. Eleven competitors, all men, took part in eleven events in five sports.

== Athletics ==
Men
Track & road events

Athlete	Event	Heat		Quarterfinal		Semifinal		Final	
Athlete	Event	Result	Rank	Result	Rank	Result	Rank	Result	Rank
Maung Rajan	50 km walk	—						DNF	
Thin Sumbwegam	Marathon	—						2:30:35.8	35

== Boxing ==
Men

Athlete	Event	1 Round	2 Round	Quarterfinals	Semifinals	Final	
Athlete	Event	Opposition Result	Opposition Result	Opposition Result	Opposition Result	Opposition Result	Rank
Bawa Maung	Flyweight	Stanislav Sorokin (URS); L TKO-2	did not advance				
Thein Myint	Bantamweight	Cassis Aryee (GHA); L TKO-2	did not advance				
Tin Tun	Featherweight	Ronald Smith (GBR); W RSC-1	Anthony Andeh (NGR); W RSC-1	Heinz Schulz (GER); L 0–5	did not advance		5

== Shooting ==
Two shooters represented Burma in 1964.

Open

Athlete	Event	Qualification		Final	
Athlete	Event	Score	Rank	Score	Rank
Kyaw Shein	50 m rifle, prone	584	50	did not advance	
Kyaw Aye	50 m rifle, prone	580	55	did not advance	

== Swimming ==
Men

Athlete	Event	Heat		Final	
Athlete	Event	Time	Rank	Time	Rank
Tin Maung Ni	400 m freestyle	4:40.9	39	Did not advance	
Tin Maung Ni	1500 m freestyle	18:09.5	20	Did not advance	

== Weightlifting ==
Men

Athlete	Event	Military press		Snatch		Clean & Jerk		Total	Rank
Athlete	Event	Result	Rank	Result	Rank	Result	Rank	Total	Rank
Chit Mya	56 kg	90,0	19	95,0	14	125,0	14	310,0	16
Mya Thein	67.5 kg	110,0	16	105,0	15	145,0	9	360,0	13
Pe Aye	75 kg	122,5	13	112,5	16	150,0	14	385,0	15
