= Burma at the 1984 Summer Olympics =

- IOC code: BIR

in Los Angeles
- Competitors: 1 in 1 sport
- Flag bearer: Latt Zaw
- Medals: Gold 0 Silver 0 Bronze 0 Total 0

Summer Olympics appearances (overview)
- 1948; 1952; 1956; 1960; 1964; 1968; 1972; 1976; 1980; 1984; 1988; 1992; 1996; 2000; 2004; 2008; 2012; 2016; 2020; 2024

Burma competed at the 1984 Summer Olympics in Los Angeles, United States.

== Background ==
He was the only Burmese athlete there, as chef de mission, Nyein Aung, said that the nation would only send athletes that had a chance. He qualified because of his win at the South East Asian Games. Three athletes went to the Olympics for Burma, Latt, Aung, and his coach, Khin Maung Win. The delegation left Rangoon on 23 July, and then went through Bangkok, arriving in Hong Kong the next day. They then went to Tokyo to get on a flight to California, the location of the Olympics. Latt was the flagbearer for Burma at the Olympics and marched alongside the rest of the delegation and an American escort.

== Boxing ==
Men

On 25 July, Latt fought his first round match against Christopher Ossai of Nigeria. He almost knocked out Ossai in the first round but did not manage to do so. The second round was even, and Ossai won the third and final round 5-0, ending the match. In the match zero judges favored Latt and all five favored Ossai, judge one awarded Latt 58 points and Ossai 59. Judge two awarded 57 points to Latt and 60 to the Nigerian boxer. Judge three gave the Burmese competitor 55 and Ossai 60, and judge four awarded Latt 56 and Ossai got 59. Judge five gave 56 points to Latt and 60 to Ossai. All of these combined gave 282 points to Latt and 298 to Ossai.

Athlete	Event	1 Round	2 Round	3 Round	Quarterfinals	Semifinals	Final	
Athlete	Event	Opposition Result	Opposition Result	Opposition Result	Opposition Result	Opposition Result	Opposition Result	Rank
Zaw Latt	Lightweight	Christopher Ossai (NGR); L 0-5	did not advance					

Points
Boxer	Judges Favoring	Judge 1's Score	Judge 2's Score	Judge 3's Score	Judge 4's Score	Judge 5's Score	Total Score	References
Zaw Latt	0	58	57	55	56	56	282	
Christopher Ossai	5	59	60	60	59	60	298	
