= Soe Myint (sport shooter) =

Burmese sports shooter

Personal information
- Nationality: Burmese
- Born: 22 September 1958 (age 66)

Sport
- Sport: Sports shooting

Soe Myint (born 22 September 1958) is a Burmese sports shooter. He competed in the men's 10 metre air pistol event at the 1996 Summer Olympics.
