= Trần Quốc Cường =

Vietnamese sport shooter

Medal record

Representing Vietnam

Men's Shooting

Asian Games
Bronze medal – third place	2006 Doha	10 m air pistol team
Bronze medal – third place	2014 Incheon	50 m pistol team
Bronze medal – third place	2018 Palembang	10 m air pistol mixed team

Asian Championships
Bronze medal – third place	2012 Doha	10 m air pistol team
Bronze medal – third place	2015 Kuwait	10 m air pistol team

Southeast Asian Games
Gold medal – first place	2021 Hanoi	50 m pistol
Gold medal – first place	2015 Singapore	10 m air pistol team
Gold medal – first place	2015 Singapore	10 m air pistol
Gold medal – first place	2013 Naypyidaw	50 m air pistol team
Gold medal – first place	2013 Naypyidaw	50 m free pistol team
Gold medal – first place	2011 Palembang	50 m free pistol
Gold medal – first place	2007 Nakhon Ratchasima	10 m air pistol
Bronze medal – third place	2019 Philippines	10 m air pistol
Bronze medal – third place	2011 Palembang	10 m air pistol
Bronze medal – third place	2007 Nakhon Ratchasima	10 m air pistol
Bronze medal – third place	2007 Nakhon Ratchasima	50 m air pistol team

Trần Quốc Cường (born 27 July 1974 in Hải Dương) is a Vietnamese sport shooter. He has qualified to represent Vietnam at the 2016 Summer Olympics in the 10m air pistol and 50m pistol disciplines.
