= Tun Maung Kywe =

Burmese weightlifter (1931–2024)

Personal information
- Nationality: Burmese
- Born: 15 October 1931 Mergui, Burma, British India

Sport
- Sport: Weightlifting

Tun Maung Kywe (born 15 October 1931) was a Burmese weightlifter. He competed at the 1956 Summer Olympics and the 1960 Summer Olympics.
