= Maung Maung Nge =

Burmese long-distance runner

Personal information
- Nationality: Burmese
- Born: 12 February 1978 (age 48)

Sport
- Sport: Long-distance running
- Event: 5000 metres

Maung Maung Nge (born 12 February 1978) is a Burmese long-distance runner. He competed in the men's 5000 metres at the 2000 Summer Olympics.
