= Myint Tayzar Phone =

Burmese sprint canoer

Myint Tayzar Phone (Burmese: မြင့်တေဇာဖုန်း) born July 2, 1978) is a sprint canoer from Myanmar who competed in the late 2000s. At the 2008 Summer Olympics in Beijing, he was eliminated in the semifinals of the K-1 500 m event and the heats of the K-1 1000 m event.
