= Yan Naing Soe =

Burmese judoka

Yan Naing Soe (born 31 January 1979) is a Burmese judoka. He competed at the 2016 Summer Olympics in the men's 100 kg event, in which he was eliminated in the third round by Karl-Richard Frey. He was the flag bearer for Myanmar at the Parade of Nations.
