= Maung Kyu =

Burmese sport shooter (born 1970)

Maung Kyu (born 11 August 1970 in Myaungmya) is a Burmese sport shooter who competes in the men's 10 metre air pistol. At the 2012 Summer Olympics, he finished 39th in the qualifying round, failing to make the cut for the final.
