= Ye Tun Naung =

Burmese sport shooter (born 1983)

Personal information
- Born: 26 May 1983 (age 43) Minhla, Bago
- Height: 1.7 m (5 ft 7 in)
- Weight: 69 kg (152 lb)

Sport
- Country: Myanmar
- Sport: Sports shooting
- Event: 50m free pistol
Medal record
Southeast Asian Games
Silver medal – second place	2013 Yangon	50m free pistol

Ye Tun Naung (born 26 May 1983 in Minhla) is a Burmese sport shooter who competes in pistol events. In 2014 he represented Myanmar in 2014 Asian Games. In 2015 he won silver in 3rd World Cup stage and secured quota for Myanmar in 2016 Summer Olympics.
