= Myanmar Olympic Committee =

National Olympic Committee

- Country: Myanmar
- Code: MYA
- Created: 26 November 1946; 79 years ago
- Recognized: 9 July 1947; 79 years ago
- Continental Association: OCA
- Headquarters: Wunna Theikdi Stadium, Nay Pyi Taw
- President: Jeng Phang Naw Taung (Minister for the Ministry of Sports and Youth Affairs)
- Secretary General: Myo Hlaing (Deputy Minister)

The Myanmar Olympic Committee (Burmese: မြန်မာနိုင်ငံအိုလံပစ်ကော်မတီ, IOC code: MYA) is the National Olympic Committee representing Myanmar (formerly called Burma). It was founded in 1946 by Zaw Weik.

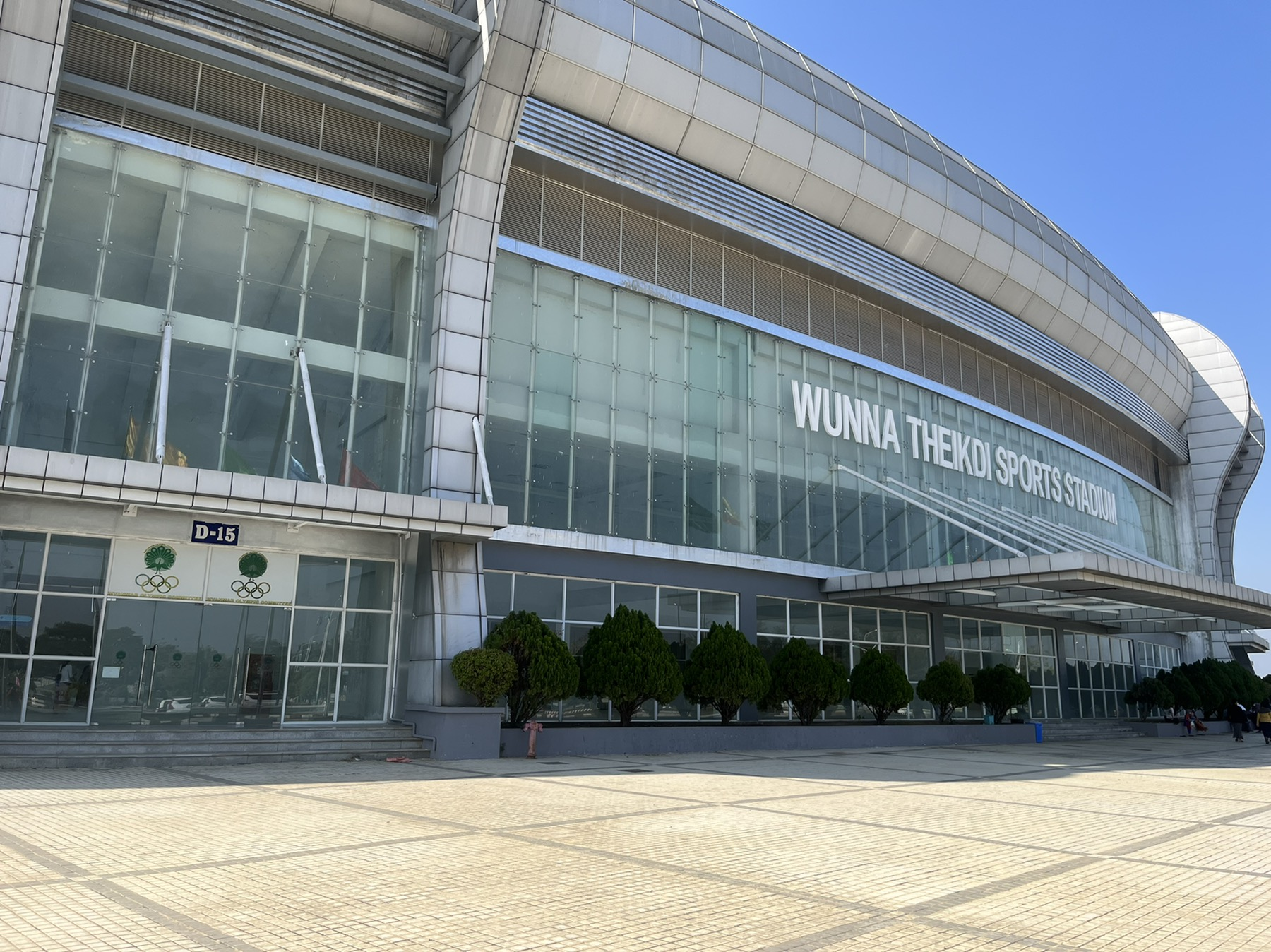
MOC Headquarters

== Mandate of the committee ==
- To perform the sports affairs according to the policies of Myanmar National Sports Committee.
- To inform the aims of Olympic Games.
- To prepare for the national teams that would compete at the Olympic Games, Asian Games and South East Asian Games.
- To interconnect between the Myanmar Sports Associations and International Olympic Committee.
- To open sports courses and send students to the international courses with the help of the IOC.
- Contact with the Olympic Games, Asian Games, Southeast Asian Games and Regional Sports Festivals Federations to host events in Myanmar
- To perform the duties given by the Myanmar National Sports Committee.
