= Flag of Myanmar =

State Flag of the Republic of the Union of Myanmar ပြည်ထောင်စုသမ္မတမြန်မာနိုင်ငံတော် နိုင်ငံတော်အလံ
- The State Flag; နိုင်ငံတော်အလံ; The Union Flag; ပြည်ထောင်စုအလံတော်; Saffron Green Red; ဝါစိမ်းနီ
- Use: Civil and state flag, civil and state ensign
- Proportion: 2:3
- Adopted: 21 October 2010; 16 years ago
- Design: A horizontal triband of saffron, green and red; charged with one large white five-pointed star at the centre.
- Designed by: National Coalition Government of the Union of Burma

The State Flag of the Republic of the Union of Myanmar is a horizontal rectangular tricolor flag of yellow, green, and red with a large white five-pointed star in the center. The current flag was adopted on 21 October 2010.

== Current flag since 2010 ==
The State Flag described in the 2008 Constitution of the Republic of the Union of Myanmar was adopted by enacting the 2010 Union Flag Law and the abolishment of the 1974 State Flag Law on 21 October 2010. It was hoisted for the first time at 3:00 p.m. local time on 21 October 2010. Orders were also handed out to ensure all old national flags were burned.

Unlike the previous 1974 State Flag Law, the 2010 Union Flag Law includes the definition of the flag. The current flag is a horizontal tricolour flag of yellow, green, and red charged with a five-pointed white star in the centre of the field. The background is a tricolour of yellow, green, and red, meant to honour the tricolours used during the independence struggle. The yellow represents unity, conformity, wisdom, happiness, and unity of all national races amicably. The green symbolises fertility, conformity, fairness, and being a peaceful, pleasant, and green nation. The red represents bravery and decisiveness. The white star stands for purity, honesty, fullness of compassion, and power.

State Flag of the Republic of the Union of Myanmar, in use since 21 October 2010.

Detailed construction sheet.

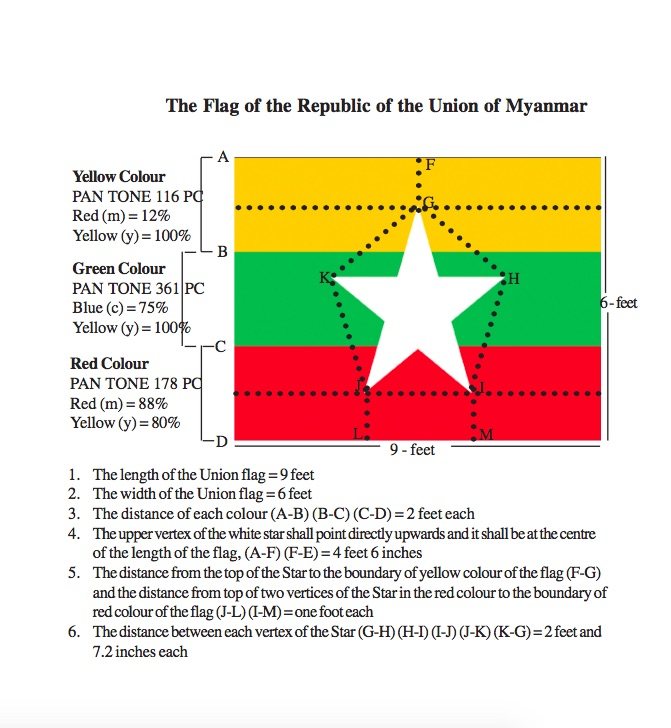
Specifications of the flag.

| Scheme | Yellow | Green | Red | White |
|---|---|---|---|---|
| Pantone | 116 | 361 | 1788 | Safe |
| RGB | 254-203-0 | 52-178-51 | 234-40-57 | 255-255-255 |
| Hexadecimal | #FECB00 | #34B233 | #EA2839 | #FFFFFF |
| CMYK | 0, 20, 100, 0 | 76, 0, 100, 0 | 0, 98, 82, 0 | 0, 0, 0, 0 |

== Historical flags (1948–2010) ==
The two flags used by the country immediately before the 2010 flag both originated in the Burmese Resistance, which adopted a red flag with a white star when fighting the occupying Japanese forces during World War II.

=== 1948 flag ===
National Flag of the Union of Burma (4 January 1948 – 3 January 1974). Proportion 5:9; civil and state flag.

The National Flag of the Union of Burma was designed by Maung Win and adopted by the Constituent Assembly of the Union of Burma in August 1947. It was hoisted for the first time at 4:25 AM on 4 January 1948 when Burma gained its independence from the United Kingdom. The flag consisted of a red field defaced with a blue canton. The blue canton was charged with one large white star surrounded by five smaller stars between its rays. The big white star in the canton and the red field honour the Resistance Flag and indicate the anti-fascist struggle. The five small white stars between the rays of the big white star symbolize the unity of various ethnicities of the republican union founded as a result of the resistance. The red represents courage, determination and unity. The blue canton means the nature of the sky, having deep meanings, the fresh and clear mind, and the light emitted in the night sky. The usage of stars is for the nature of the stars: never stopping, never cancelling the chosen path, always moving forward, being a guide for travellers, and existing since the beginning of the world indicating that Burma is with its rightful glory as an independent republic on the earth, while the colour white represents purity, righteousness and steadfastness. This flag has a ratio of 5:9 in which the canton has a ratio of 2 1/2:4. On 3 January 1974, it was replaced by the State Flag of the Socialist Republic of the Union of Burma.

| Colours scheme | Blue | Red | White |
|---|---|---|---|
| RGB | 32-66-161 | 218-45-28 | 255-255-255 |
| Hexadecimal | #2042A1 | #DA2D1C | #FFFFFF |
| CMYK | 80, 59, 0, 37 | 0, 79, 87, 15 | 0, 0, 0, 0 |

=== 1974 flag ===
State Flag of the Socialist Republic of the Union of Burma (3 January 1974 – 18 September 1988) and the Union of Myanmar (18 September 1988 – 21 October 2010). Proportion 5:9; civil and state flag and state ensign.

The State Flag designed by Mya Thaung and adopted on 3 January 1974 upon the coming into force of the Constitution of the Socialist Republic of the Union of Burma has a similar ratio and background colours as the previous flag but with different charge in the canton. The colour representations are also different: white is for purity and virtue, red for bravery and decisiveness, blue for peacefulness and steadfastness or integrity. It depicts 14 white stars of equal size encircling a pinion with 14 cogs and ear of paddy with 34 grains superimposed on it (each star on each tooth of the pinion) in a blue canton against a red field. The paddy represents peasants while the pinion represents workers; the combination symbolizes the peasants and workers as the fundamental social classes of building the socialist system. The 14 white stars of equal size represent the equality and unity of the 14 members (7 states and 7 divisions) of the Union.

After the 1988 coup, the new juntas, the State Law and Order Restoration Council (SLORC) and its successor the State Peace and Development Council (SPDC), continued to use this flag as the State Flag of the Union of Myanmar. But they removed the reference to socialism by replacing "the socialist system" with "the State" in the school lesson about the State Flag; peasants and workers became the fundamental social classes of building the State.

The 14-star flag was hung upside down during the 8888 Uprising of 1988 by demonstrators as a sign of protest against the military government. Despite its association with the periods of military rule, the 1974 flag is used by demonstrators in the 2021 Myanmar protests, alongside the 1948 flag.

| Colours scheme | Blue | Red | White |
|---|---|---|---|
| RGB | 32-66-161 | 218-45-28 | 255-255-255 |
| Hexadecimal | #2042A1 | #DA2D1C | #FFFFFF |
| CMYK | 80, 59, 0, 37 | 0, 79, 87, 15 | 0, 0, 0, 0 |

== Vertical style ==
=== Current flag ===
When hanging or depicting vertically, the yellow must be on left and the star must point to left.

=== Obsolete flags ===
==== 1948 flag ====
When hanging or depicting vertically, the blue canton must be in the upper hoist, and the stars in the canton must point to the left.

== Influence of pre-independence flags ==
=== The Tricolours ===
In 1930, the Dobama Asiayone adopted a tricolour (Burmese: သုံးရောင်ခြယ်, lit. 'three colour painted') of yellow, green and red. In 1935, a peacock was added in the centre of the tricolour. In 1938, the leftists from Dobama Asiayone replaced the peacock with a hammer and sickle. Both of the tricolours were widely used by anti-colonialists during British rule. The peacock flag was also used by the Burma Independence Army and the State of Burma adopted it as the national flag from 1943 to 1945. In 1943, a stylized version of the peacock was introduced. This version was used by the Burma Defense Army (with the peacock in red) and as a variant of the national flag by the State of Burma (with the peacock in gold). There are two songs with the same name, "သုံးရောင်ခြယ်သီချင်း" (meaning: "Tricolour Song"), composed by two different composers about the meaning behind the Tricolour symbolism and the hope of Burmese people.

Dobama Asiayone (1930–1935)

Dobama Asiayone (1935–1938)

Dobama Asiayone (1938–1939)

Dobama Asiayone (Variant) (1938–1939)

Burma Independence Army (1942)

The State of Burma (1943–1945)

The State of Burma (stylized) (1943–1945)

Burma Defence Army (1943)

In these tricolours, the color saffron symbolizes the Śāsana (Theravada Buddhism) and education, green represents staple grains, crops, minerals and jewelry, red signifies bravery or courage, and the peacock represents the Konbaung. The hammer and sickle represent workers and peasants, respectively.

=== The Resistance Flag ===
The Resistance Flag (1945)

In 1945, when the Burma National Army changed sides and fought together with local resistance forces against the Japanese. A new flag, with a red field charged with a white star in the upper hoist, was adopted as the "Resistance Flag."

=== Influences ===
The tricolours and the resistance flag have been depicted as "national flags" together with the pre-colonial and post-independence national flags. The resistance flag is alluded to and honoured by the 1948–1974 flag, while all the tricolours are referred and honoured by the current flag.

== Proposals ==
=== 1947 proposals ===
In 1947, the Constituent Assembly of the Union of Burma formed a preparatory committee for State flag, State seal and State anthem. That committee held a flag design contest, and the flag designed by Maung Win won the first prize. There was a dispute at the committee's meeting in August 1947 whether or not the peacock should be added further to the proposed State flag; but after long discussions, the committee decided that the peacock should be rejected.

Flag designed by Maung Win, which won the first prize at the flag design contest (1947)

=== 2006–2007 proposals ===
A new design for the national flag was proposed on 10 November 2006 during a constitutional convention. The new flag would have consisted of three equally sized green, yellow, and red horizontal stripes, with a white star in the hoist end of the green stripe.

In September 2007, another new design was proposed with a larger white star in the middle and with the stripes in a different order, namely: yellow, green, and red. The proposal was a version of Burmese Tricolour with the white star. This proposal is also based on the flag of the National Coalition Government of the Union of Burma.

The flag proposed in September 2007 was included in the new constitution, and was accepted with the 2008 referendum.

2006 proposal

2007 proposal

=== Former 2019 proposals ===
Two years before the 2021 coup, the ruling National League for Democracy (NLD) proposed a series of constitutional amendments in July 2019, including one to change the national flag. Four political parties, the NLD, Shan Nationalities League for Democracy (SNLD), Zomi Congress for Democracy (ZCD) and National United Democratic Party (NUDP) proposed four new designs for the flag. The NLD proposed changing the national flag as they do not believe that the flag adopted in 2010 has the full support of the people of Myanmar. Their proposed flag was based on the flag adopted by the country at independence and consisted of a red field with a blue canton in the upper hoist. Within the blue canton is a large white star representing the union which is surrounded by 14 smaller white stars representing the states and regions of the country.

The NLD's proposal

The SNLD's proposal

The ZCD's proposal

The NUDP's proposal

== Historical flags before 1948 ==
Flag used in the Hanthawaddy kingdom (c. 1287–1552)

Flag used as national flag of Burma under Konbaung Dynasty (c. 1752–1885)

Flag of the United Kingdom used as the colonial flag of British Burma (1886 – 1942; 1945 – 4 January 1948)

Colonial flag of British Burma (6 February 1939 – 30 March 1941; 1945 – 3 January 1948)

Provisional colonial flag of British Burma (30 March 1941 – 1942)

Provisional flag of Japanese Military Administration of Burma (1942–1943)

State flag of the State of Burma (1 August 1943 – 1945)

Stylized variant design of the flag of the State of Burma (1943–1945)

== Gallery ==
Flag of Myanmar flown on the Presidential Palace, Naypyidaw

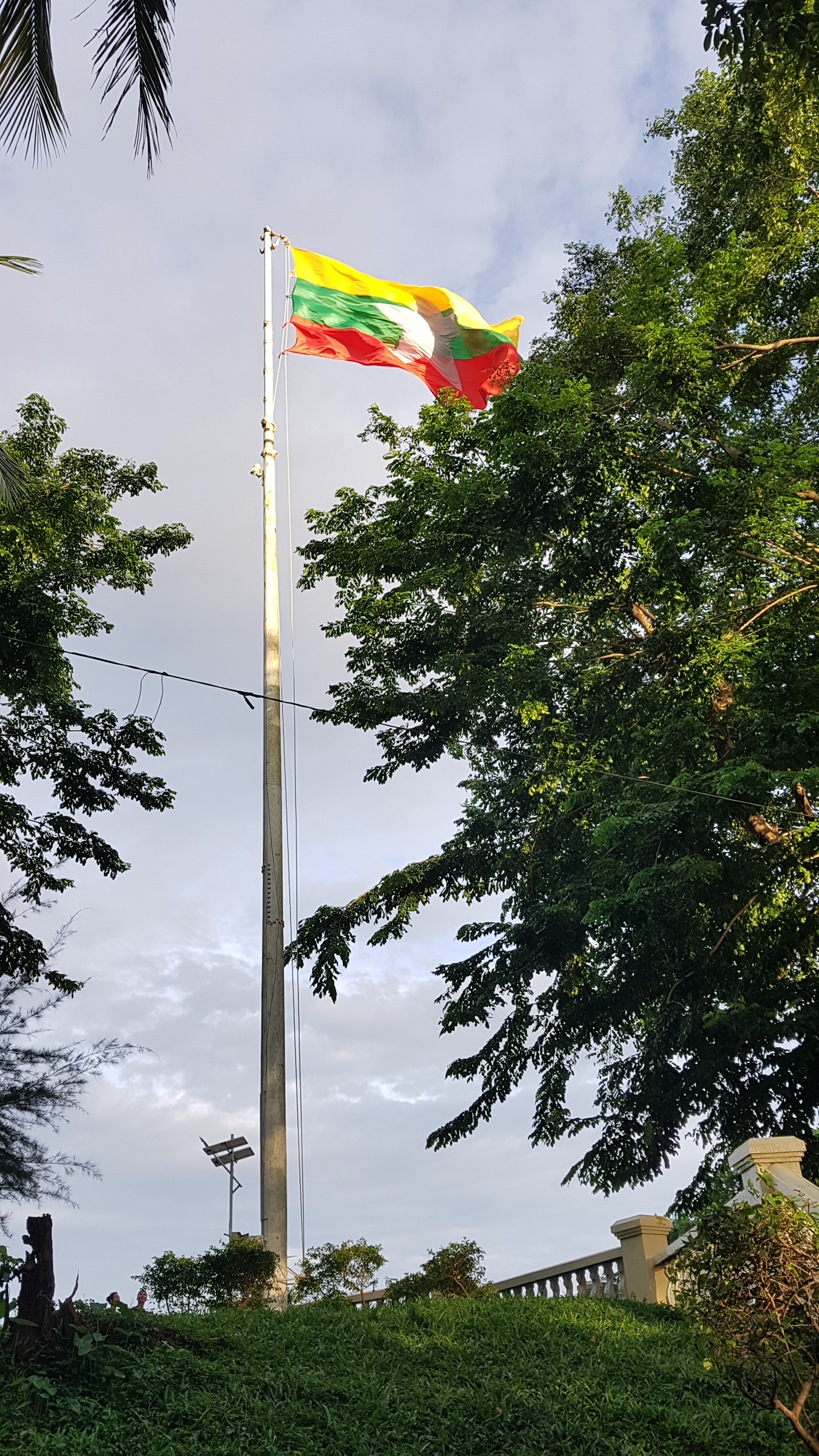
Flag of Myanmar flown at Bayint Naung Statue Garden Park in Kawthaung.

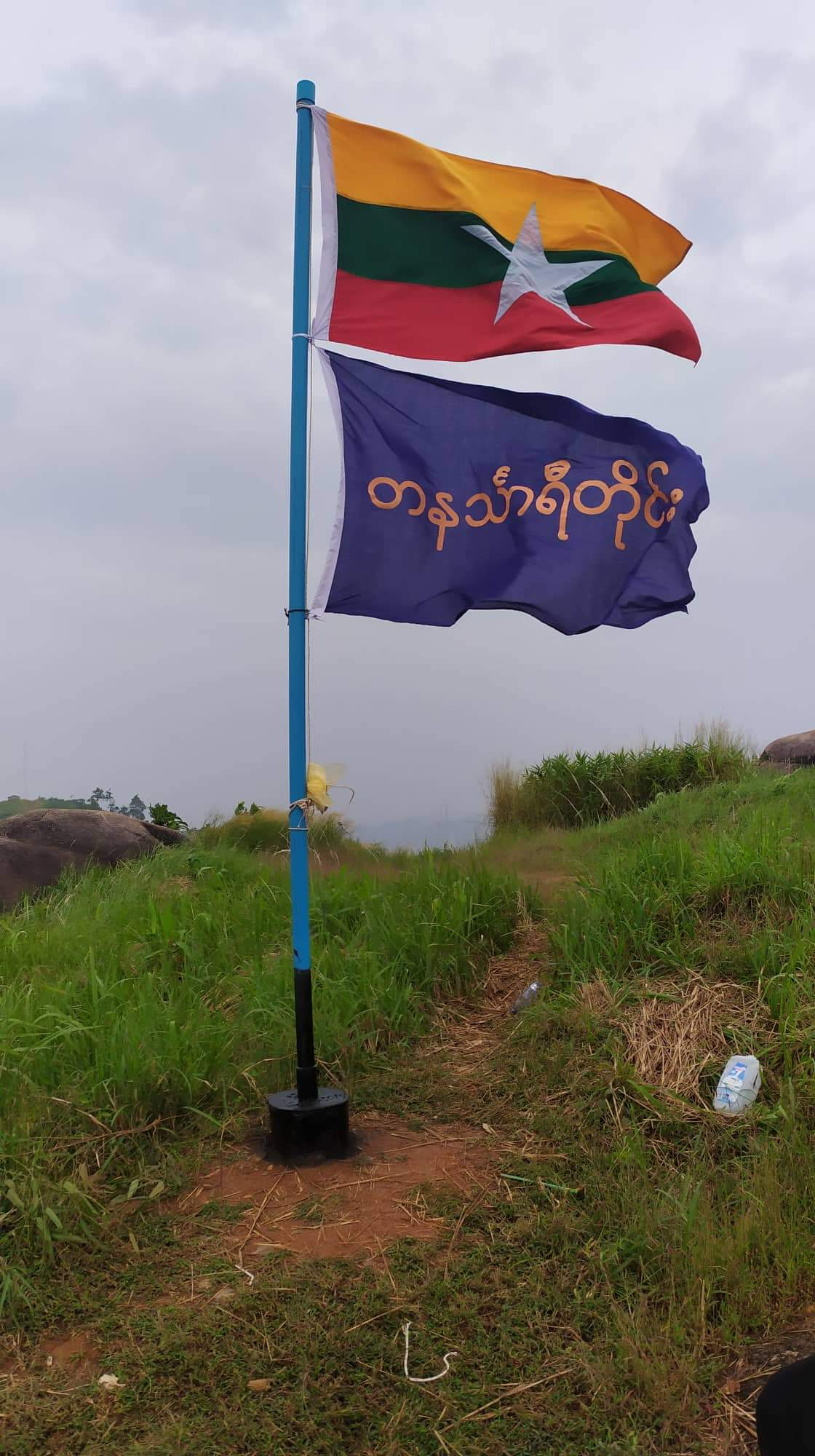
The flag of Myanmar flown alongside the former flag of Tanintharyi Region (1974–2010) on 1199 Mountain Peak in Kawthaung.

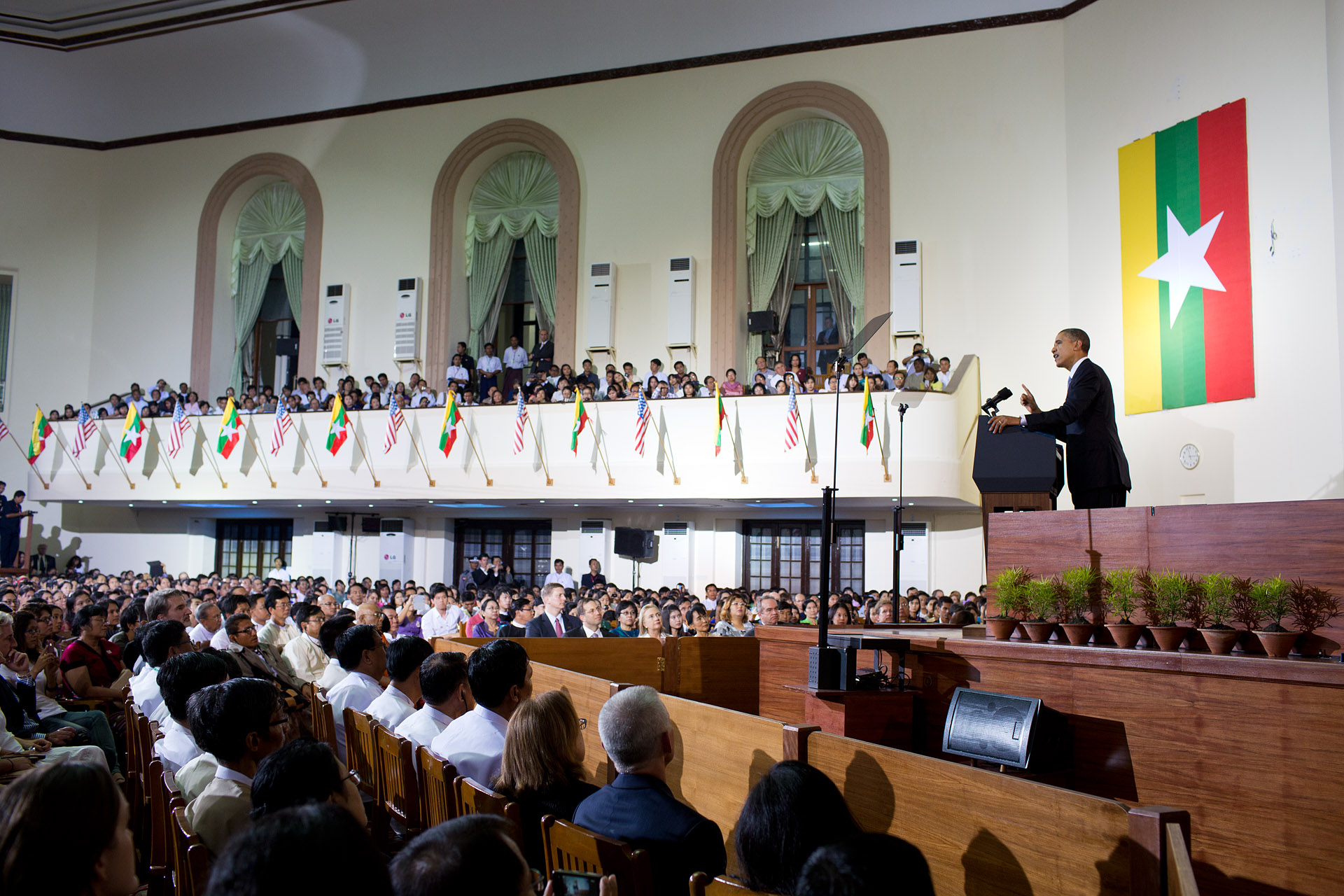
Barack Obama addressing the Burmese public during a speech at the University of Yangon on 19 November 2012. The vertical version of the Union Flag was depicted on the wall behind.

== See also ==
- List of Burmese flags
- State Seal of Myanmar
- The similar flag of Lithuania and flag of Ethiopia
