= China at the 2012 Summer Olympics =

- IOC code: CHN
- NOC: Chinese Olympic Committee
- Website: www.olympic.cn (in Chinese and English)

in London
- Competitors: 396 in 23 sports
- Flag bearers: Yi Jianlian (opening); Xu Lijia (closing)
- Medals Ranked 2nd: Gold 39 Silver 31 Bronze 22 Total 92

Summer Olympics appearances (overview)
- 1952; 1956–1980; 1984; 1988; 1992; 1996; 2000; 2004; 2008; 2012; 2016; 2020; 2024; 2028

Other related appearances
- Republic of China (1924–1948)

The People's Republic of China, the previous host of the 2008 Olympics at Beijing, competed at the 2012 Summer Olympics in London, the United Kingdom, between 27 July and 12 August 2012. This was the nation's ninth appearance at the Summer Olympics since its debut in 1952. A total of 396 Chinese athletes, 171 men and 225 women, were selected by the Chinese Olympic Committee to compete in 23 sports. For the fourth time in its Olympic history, China was represented by more female than male athletes.

China left London with a total of 88 medals – 38 gold, 27 silver, and 23 bronze – finishing second only to the United States in the global medal standings. The Chinese delegation proved particularly successful in several sports, winning twelve medals in gymnastics, ten in diving and swimming, eight in badminton, seven in weightlifting and shooting, and six in table tennis. Chinese athletes dominated in badminton and table tennis, where they won all the available gold medals. Eleven Chinese athletes managed to defend their titles from the 2008 Olympics, hosted by China; 18 Chinese athletes won more than one Olympic medal in London. China also won its first ever Olympic medal in modern pentathlon.

Among the nation's medalists were Sun Yang and Ye Shiwen, who were the first Chinese swimmers to win two gold medals in their events; Sun and Ye broke a world record and an Olympic record, respectively. Sun also dominated the nation's Olympic medal standings, winning four medals. Gymnast Zou Kai, who won two golds and one bronze in London, became the most successful Chinese athlete in history with a total of six Olympic medals. Springboard diver Wu Minxia became the first Chinese athlete to win a gold medal in a single event at three consecutive Olympic Games. Meanwhile, Chen Ruolin became the second diver in Chinese history to defend two Olympic titles at a single games, after Guo Jingjing did so in two springboard events in 2008.

In the years after the Olympics, Russian track and field athlete Darya Pishchalnikova was disqualified for doping, therefore bronze medalist Li Yanfeng was upgraded to silver. Fellow Russian Sergey Kirdyapkin was also disqualified for doping in the 50 kilometres walk, so bronze medalist Si Tianfeng was promoted to silver; Russian athletes Elena Lashmanova and Olga Kaniskina were also disqualified, and Qieyang Shenjie and Liu Hong were promoted to gold and silver at the 20 kilometres walk, respectively, sixth placer Lü Xiuzhi was also promoted to bronze. Another Russian, silver medalist in the shot put, Yevgeniya Kolodko, was also found guilty for doping, so Gong Lijao was promoted to silver and Li Ling to bronze, and Zhang Wenxiu was also promoted to bronze after the original winner in the hammer throw, Tatyana Lysenko was also disqualified.

== Medalists ==
=== By chronological order ===
Medal	Name	Sport	Event	Date
Gold	Yi Siling	Shooting	Women's 10 m air rifle	28 July
Gold	Wang Mingjuan	Weightlifting	Women's 48 kg	28 July
Gold	Ye Shiwen	Swimming	Women's 400 m individual medley	28 July
Gold	Sun Yang	Swimming	Men's 400 m freestyle	28 July
Gold	Guo Wenjun	Shooting	Women's 10 m air pistol	29 July
Gold	He Zi; Wu Minxia	Diving	Women's synchronized 3 m springboard	29 July
Gold	Cao Yuan; Zhang Yanquan	Diving	Men's synchronized 10 m platform	30 July
Gold	Li Xueying	Weightlifting	Women's 58 kg	30 July
Gold	Chen Yibing; Feng Zhe; Guo Weiyang; Zhang Chenglong; Zou Kai	Gymnastics	Men's artistic team all-around	30 July
Gold	Chen Ruolin; Wang Hao	Diving	Women's synchronized 10 m platform	31 July
Gold	Lei Sheng	Fencing	Men's individual foil	31 July
Gold	Ye Shiwen	Swimming	Women's 200 m individual medley	31 July
Gold	Lin Qingfeng	Weightlifting	Men's 69 kg	31 July
Gold	Luo Yutong; Qin Kai	Diving	Men's synchronized 3 m springboard	1 August
Gold	Li Xiaoxia	Table tennis	Women's singles	1 August
Gold	Lü Xiaojun	Weightlifting	Men's 77 kg	1 August
Gold	Jiao Liuyang	Swimming	Women's 200 m butterfly	1 August
Gold	Zhang Jike	Table tennis	Men's singles	2 August
Gold	Dong Dong	Gymnastics	Men's trampoline	3 August
Gold	Zhang Nan; Zhao Yunlei	Badminton	Mixed doubles	3 August
Gold	Li Xuerui	Badminton	Women's singles	4 August
Gold	Tian Qing; Zhao Yunlei	Badminton	Women's doubles	4 August
Gold	Chen Ding	Athletics	Men's 20 km walk	4 August
Gold	Sun Yang	Swimming	Men's 1500 m freestyle	4 August
Gold	Li Na; Luo Xiaojuan; Sun Yujie; Xu Anqi	Fencing	Women's team épée	4 August
Gold	Lin Dan	Badminton	Men's singles	5 August
Gold	Zou Kai	Gymnastics	Men's floor	5 August
Gold	Cai Yun; Fu Haifeng	Badminton	Men's doubles	5 August
Gold	Zhou Lulu	Weightlifting	Women's +75 kg	5 August
Gold	Wu Minxia	Diving	Women's 3 m springboard	5 August
Gold	Xu Lijia	Sailing	Women's Laser Radial class	6 August
Gold	Feng Zhe	Gymnastics	Men's parallel bars	7 August
Gold	Deng Linlin	Gymnastics	Women's balance beam	7 August
Gold	Ding Ning; Guo Yue; Li Xiaoxia	Table tennis	Women's team	7 August
Gold	Wang Hao; Zhang Jike; Ma Long	Table tennis	Men's team	8 August
Gold	Wu Jingyu	Taekwondo	Women's 49 kg	8 August
Gold	Chen Ruolin	Diving	Women's 10 m platform	9 August
Gold	Qieyang Shijie	Athletics	Women's 20 km walk	11 August
Gold	Zou Shiming	Boxing	Men's light flyweight	11 August
Silver	Wei Ning	Shooting	Women's skeet	29 July
Silver	Fang Yuting; Cheng Ming; Xu Jing	Archery	Women's team	29 July
Silver	Lu Ying	Swimming	Women's 100 m butterfly	29 July
Silver	Wu Jingbiao	Weightlifting	Men's 56 kg	29 July
Silver	Sun Yang	Swimming	Men's 200 m freestyle	30 July
Silver	Xu Lili	Judo	Women's 63 kg	31 July
Silver	Chen Ying	Shooting	Women's 25 m pistol	1 August
Silver	Ding Ning	Table tennis	Women's singles	1 August
Silver	Lu Haojie	Weightlifting	Men's 77 kg	1 August
Silver	Gong Jinjie; Guo Shuang	Cycling	Women's team sprint	2 August
Silver	Wang Hao	Table tennis	Men's singles	2 August
Silver	Xu Chen; Ma Jin	Badminton	Mixed doubles	3 August
Silver	Guo Shuang	Cycling	Women's keirin	3 August
Silver	Huang Wenyi; Xu Dongxiang	Rowing	Women's lightweight double sculls	4 August
Silver	Wang Yihan	Badminton	Women's singles	4 August
Silver	Huang Shanshan	Gymnastics	Women's trampoline	4 August
Silver	Li Yanfeng	Athletics	Women's discus throw	4 August
Silver	He Zi	Diving	Women's 3 m springboard	5 August
Silver	Chen Yibing	Gymnastics	Men's rings	6 August
Silver	He Kexin	Gymnastics	Women's uneven bars	6 August
Silver	Sui Lu	Gymnastics	Women's balance beam	7 August
Silver	Qin Kai	Diving	Men's 3 m springboard	7 August
Silver	Jing Ruixue	Wrestling	Women's freestyle 63 kg	8 August
Silver	Ren Cancan	Boxing	Women's flyweight	9 August
Silver	Hou Yuzhuo	Taekwondo	Women's 57 kg	9 August
Silver	Chang Si; Chen Xiaojun; Huang Xuechen; Jiang Tingting; Jiang Wenwen; Liu Ou; Luo Xi; Sun Wenyan; Wu Yiwen	Synchronized swimming	Women's team	10 August
Silver	Si Tianfeng	Athletics	Men's 50 km walk	11 August
Silver	Qiu Bo	Diving	Men's 10 m platform	11 August
Silver	Cao Zhongrong	Modern pentathlon	Men's event	11 August
Silver	Gong Lijiao	Athletics	Women's shot put	6 August
Silver	Liu Hong	Athletics	Women's 20 km walk	11 August
Bronze	Li Xuanxu	Swimming	Women's 400 m individual medley	28 July
Bronze	Yu Dan	Shooting	Women's 10 m air rifle	28 July
Bronze	Sun Yujie	Fencing	Women's individual épée	30 July
Bronze	Hao Yun; Li Yunqi; Jiang Haiqi; Sun Yang; Lü Zhiwu; Dai Jun	Swimming	Men's 4 × 200 m freestyle relay	31 July
Bronze	Tang Yi	Swimming	Women's 100 m freestyle	2 August
Bronze	Ding Feng	Shooting	Men's 25 m rapid fire pistol	3 August
Bronze	Lu Chunlong	Gymnastics	Men's trampoline	3 August
Bronze	Dai Xiaoxiang	Archery	Men's individual	3 August
Bronze	Tong Wen	Judo	Women's +78 kg	3 August
Bronze	He Wenna	Gymnastics	Women's trampoline	4 August
Bronze	Wang Zhen	Athletics	Men's 20 kilometres walk	4 August
Bronze	Chen Long	Badminton	Men's singles	5 August
Bronze	Wang Zhiwei	Shooting	Men's 50 m pistol	5 August
Bronze	Zou Kai	Gymnastics	Men's horizontal bar	7 August
Bronze	Huang Xuechen; Liu Ou	Synchronized swimming	Women's duet	7 August
Bronze	Guo Shuang	Cycling	Women's sprint	7 August
Bronze	He Chong	Diving	Men's 3 m springboard	7 August
Bronze	Li Jinzi	Boxing	Women's middleweight	8 August
Bronze	Zhang Wenxiu	Athletics	Women's hammer throw	10 August
Bronze	Liu Xiaobo	Taekwondo	Men's +80 kg	11 August
Bronze	Li Ling^{2}	Athletics	Women's shot put	6 August
Bronze	Lü Xiuzhi	Athletics	Women's 20 km walk	11 August

=== Multiple medalists ===
Multiple medalists
**Name**	**Sport**	1st place, gold medalist(s)	2nd place, silver medalist(s)	3rd place, bronze medalist(s)	Total
Sun Yang	Swimming	2	1	1	4
Zou Kai	Gymnastics	2	0	1	3
Zhao Yunlei	Badminton	2	0	0	2
Chen Ruolin	Diving	2	0	0	2
Wu Minxia	Diving	2	0	0	2
Feng Zhe	Gymnastics	2	0	0	2
Ye Shiwen	Swimming	2	0	0	2
Li Xiaoxia	Table tennis	2	0	0	2
Zhang Jike	Table tennis	2	0	0	2
He Zi	Diving	1	1	0	2
Qin Kai	Diving	1	1	0	2
Chen Yibing	Gymnastics	1	1	0	2
Ding Ning	Table tennis	1	1	0	2
Wang Hao	Table tennis	1	1	0	2
Sun Yujie	Fencing	1	0	1	2
Guo Shuang	Cycling	0	2	1	3
Huang Xuechen	Synchronized swimming	0	1	1	2
Liu Ou	Synchronized swimming	0	1	1	2

=== Repeat medalists ===
Successful defending champions are marked in bold.

Name	Sport	Event	00	04	08	12
Four participations
Li Na	Fencing	Women's team épée	3rd place, bronze medalist(s)	6	NE	1st place, gold medalist(s)
Li Na	Fencing	Women's épée	R2	R2	4	R3
Three participations, all with medals
**Wu Minxia**	Diving	Women's synchronized 3 m springboard		1st place, gold medalist(s)	1st place, gold medalist(s)	1st place, gold medalist(s)
**Wu Minxia**	Diving	Women's 3 m springboard		2nd place, silver medalist(s)	3rd place, bronze medalist(s)	1st place, gold medalist(s)
**Wang Hao**	Table tennis	Men's team		NE	1st place, gold medalist(s)	1st place, gold medalist(s)
**Wang Hao**	Table tennis	Men's singles		2nd place, silver medalist(s)	2nd place, silver medalist(s)	2nd place, silver medalist(s)
**Guo Yue**	Table tennis	Women's team		NE	1st place, gold medalist(s)	1st place, gold medalist(s)
**Guo Yue**	Table tennis	Women's singles			3rd place, bronze medalist(s)	
**Guo Yue**	Table tennis	Women's doubles		3rd place, bronze medalist(s)	NE	NE
**Zou Shiming**	Boxing	Men's light flyweight		3rd place, bronze medalist(s)	1st place, gold medalist(s)	1st place, gold medalist(s)
Three participations, two with medals
**Lin Dan**	Badminton	Men's singles		R1	1st place, gold medalist(s)	1st place, gold medalist(s)
Cai Yun; Fu Haifeng	Badminton	Men's doubles		QF	2nd place, silver medalist(s)	1st place, gold medalist(s)
Huang Shanshan	Gymnastics	Women's trampoline		3rd place, bronze medalist(s)	14	2nd place, silver medalist(s)
Chen Ying	Shooting	Women's 25 m pistol		4	1st place, gold medalist(s)	2nd place, silver medalist(s)
Wei Ning	Shooting	Women's skeet		2nd place, silver medalist(s)	6	2nd place, silver medalist(s)
Two participations, both with medals
Guo Shuang	Cycling	Women's sprint			3rd place, bronze medalist(s)	3rd place, bronze medalist(s)
Guo Shuang	Cycling	Women's team sprint			NE	2nd place, silver medalist(s)
Guo Shuang	Cycling	Women's keirin			NE	2nd place, silver medalist(s)
**Chen Ruolin**	Diving	Women's synchronized 10 m platform			1st place, gold medalist(s)	1st place, gold medalist(s)
**Chen Ruolin**	Diving	Women's 10 m platform			1st place, gold medalist(s)	1st place, gold medalist(s)
**Qin Kai**	Diving	Men's synchronized 3 m springboard			1st place, gold medalist(s)	1st place, gold medalist(s)
**Qin Kai**	Diving	Men's 3 m springboard			3rd place, bronze medalist(s)	2nd place, silver medalist(s)
He Chong	Diving	Men's 3 m springboard			1st place, gold medalist(s)	3rd place, bronze medalist(s)
**Zou Kai**	Gymnastics	Men's artistic team all-around			1st place, gold medalist(s)	1st place, gold medalist(s)
**Zou Kai**	Gymnastics	Men's floor			1st place, gold medalist(s)	1st place, gold medalist(s)
**Zou Kai**	Gymnastics	Men's horizontal bar			1st place, gold medalist(s)	3rd place, bronze medalist(s)
**Chen Yibing**	Gymnastics	Men's artistic team all-around			1st place, gold medalist(s)	1st place, gold medalist(s)
**Chen Yibing**	Gymnastics	Men's rings			1st place, gold medalist(s)	2nd place, silver medalist(s)
He Kexin	Gymnastics	Women's artistic team all-around			1st place, gold medalist(s)	4
He Kexin	Gymnastics	Women's uneven bars			1st place, gold medalist(s)	2nd place, silver medalist(s)
Deng Linlin	Gymnastics	Women's artistic team all-around			1st place, gold medalist(s)	4
Deng Linlin	Gymnastics	Women's balance beam			9	1st place, gold medalist(s)
Dong Dong	Gymnastics	Men's trampoline			3rd place, bronze medalist(s)	1st place, gold medalist(s)
Lu Chunlong	Gymnastics	Men's trampoline			1st place, gold medalist(s)	3rd place, bronze medalist(s)
He Wenna	Gymnastics	Women's trampoline			1st place, gold medalist(s)	3rd place, bronze medalist(s)
Tong Wen	Judo	Women's +78 kg			1st place, gold medalist(s)	3rd place, bronze medalist(s)
Xu Lijia	Sailing	Women's Laser Radial class			3rd place, bronze medalist(s)	1st place, gold medalist(s)
**Guo Wenjun**	Shooting	Women's 10 m air pistol			1st place, gold medalist(s)	1st place, gold medalist(s)
Jiao Liuyang	Swimming	Women's 200 m butterfly			2nd place, silver medalist(s)	1st place, gold medalist(s)
Huang Xuechen; Liu Ou	Synchronized swimming	Women's team			3rd place, bronze medalist(s)	2nd place, silver medalist(s)
Huang Xuechen; Liu Ou	Synchronized swimming	Women's duet				3rd place, bronze medalist(s)
Jiang Tingting; Jiang Wenwen; Luo Xi	Synchronized swimming	Women's team			3rd place, bronze medalist(s)	2nd place, silver medalist(s)
**Wu Jingyu**	Taekwondo	Women's 49 kg			1st place, gold medalist(s)	1st place, gold medalist(s)
			00	04	08	12

== Medal distribution ==
=== By sport ===
Medals by sport
Sport	1st place, gold medalist(s)	2nd place, silver medalist(s)	3rd place, bronze medalist(s)	Total
Diving	6	3	1	10
Gymnastics	5	4	3	12
Swimming	5	2	3	10
Badminton	5	2	1	8
Weightlifting	5	2	0	7
Table tennis	4	2	0	6
Athletics	2	4	4	10
Shooting	2	2	3	7
Fencing	2	0	1	3
Boxing	1	1	1	3
Taekwondo	1	1	1	3
Sailing	1	0	0	1
Cycling	0	2	1	3
Archery	0	1	1	2
Judo	0	1	1	2
Synchronized swimming	0	1	1	2
Modern pentathlon	0	1	0	1
Rowing	0	1	0	1
Wrestling	0	1	0	1
Total	39	31	22	92

=== By date ===
Medals by date
Day	Date	1st place, gold medalist(s)	2nd place, silver medalist(s)	3rd place, bronze medalist(s)	Total
1	28 July	4	0	2	6
2	29 July	2	4	0	6
3	30 July	3	1	1	5
4	31 July	4	1	1	6
5	1 Aug	4	3	0	7
6	2 Aug	1	2	1	4
7	3 Aug	2	2	4	8
8	4 Aug	5	4	2	11
9	5 Aug	5	1	2	8
10	6 Aug	1	3	1	5
11	7 Aug	3	3	3	9
12	8 Aug	2	1	1	4
13	9 Aug	1	2	0	3
14	10 Aug	0	1	1	2
15	11 Aug	2	3	3	7
16	12 Aug	0	0	0	0
Total		39	31	22	92

=== By gender ===
Medals by gender
Gender	1st place, gold medalist(s)	2nd place, silver medalist(s)	3rd place, bronze medalist(s)	Total	Percentage
Male	17.5	9.5	10	37	40%
Female	21.5	21.5	12	55	60%
Total	39	31	22	92	100%

=== By dominance ===
Won all gold medals in one sport – 2

- Badminton – 5 golds
- Table tennis – 4 golds

Won all medals in one event (Podium Sweep) – 1

- Athletics – Women's 20 kilometres walk

Won gold and silver medals in one event – 7

- Badminton – Women's singles, also with fourth place
- Badminton – Mixed doubles
- Diving – Women's 3 metre springboard
- Gymnastics – Women's balance beam
- Table tennis – Men's singles
- Table tennis – Women's singles
- Weightlifting – Men's 77 kg

Won gold and bronze medals in one event – 5

- Athletics – Men's 20 kilometres walk, also with fourth place
- Badminton – Men's singles
- Gymnastics – Men's trampoline
- Shooting – Women's 10 metre air rifle
- Swimming – Women's 400 metre individual medley

Won gold medals in both men's and women's events – 6

- Badminton – Singles
- Badminton – Doubles
- Diving – Synchronized 3 metre springboard
- Diving – Synchronized 10 metre platform
- Table tennis – Team
- Table tennis – Singles

== Competitors ==
The Chinese Olympic Committee selected a team of 396 athletes, 171 men and 225 women, to compete in 23 sports. Equestrian, football, and handball were the only sports in which China had no representation in 2012.

The Chinese team featured 29 defending champions from the Beijing games, including springboard diver Wu Minxia, light flyweight boxer Zou Shiming, gymnasts Zou Kai and Chen Yibing, and badminton player Lin Dan. Pistol shooter and former Olympic medalist Tan Zongliang, the oldest male member of the contingent, aged 41, competed at his fifth Olympic Games. Meanwhile, fencer Li Na and basketball player Wang Zhizhi each made their fourth Olympic appearance. Trap shooter Liu Yingzi was the oldest athlete of the team, aged 41, while relay swimmer Qiu Yuhan was the youngest, aged 14. Basketballer Yi Jianlian, who had previously played for the NBA's Dallas Mavericks, was the nation's flag bearer at the opening ceremony.

The following table lists the number of Chinese competitors who participated in each Olympic sport. Note that swimming, synchronized swimming, diving, and water polo are technically considered as one sport, aquatics. However, due to their significant practical differences, they are listed separately by tradition.

Sport	Men	Women	Total
Archery	3	3	6
Athletics	30	28	58
Badminton	9	8	17
Basketball	12	12	24
Boxing	6	3	9
Canoeing	11	7	18
Cycling	5	10	15
Diving	7	5	12
Fencing	9	7	16
Field hockey	0	18	18
Gymnastics	7	8	15
Judo	1	7	8
Modern pentathlon	2	2	4
Rowing	8	12	20
Sailing	5	4	9
Shooting	13	10	23
Swimming	24	27	51
Synchronized swimming	0	9	9
Table tennis	4	4	8
Taekwondo	1	2	3
Tennis	0	4	4
Triathlon	1	1	2
Volleyball	2	14	16
Water polo	0	13	13
Weightlifting	6	4	10
Wrestling	5	3	8
Total	171	225	396

== Archery ==
China qualified 3 archers for the men's individual event, 3 archers for the women's individual event, a team for the men's team event, and a team for the women's team event.

Men

Athlete	Event	Ranking round		Round of 64	Round of 32	Round of 16	Quarterfinals	Semifinals	Finals / BM	
Athlete	Event	Score	Seed	Opposition Score	Opposition Score	Opposition Score	Opposition Score	Opposition Score	Opposition Score	Rank
Dai Xiaoxiang	Individual	678	7	Štrajhar (SLO) (58); W 6–0	Vélez (MEX) (26); W 6–0	Worth (AUS) (23); W 6–5	Kim B-M (KOR) (2); W 6–5	Oh J-H (KOR) (3); L 5–6	van der Ven (NED) (16); W 6–5	3rd place, bronze medalist(s)
Liu Zhaowu	Individual	668	22	Ruban (UKR) (43); L 5–6	did not advance					
Xing Yu	Individual	673	13	Mayr (GER) (52); W 6–0	Mohamad (MAS) (20); L 5–6	did not advance				
Dai Xiaoxiang; Liu Zhaowu; Xing Yu	Team	2019	3	—N/a		Bye	Italy (10); L 216–220	did not advance		

Women

Athlete	Event	Ranking round		Round of 64	Round of 32	Round of 16	Quarterfinals	Semifinals	Finals / BM	
Athlete	Event	Score	Seed	Opposition Score	Opposition Score	Opposition Score	Opposition Score	Opposition Score	Opposition Score	Rank
Cheng Ming	Individual	651	20	Brito (VEN) (45); W 6–4	Valencia (MEX) (13); W 7–1	Lorig (USA) (4); L 3–7	did not advance			
Fang Yuting	Individual	649	25	Rochmawati (INA) (40); L 4–6	Did not advance					
Xu Jing	Individual	646	27	Leśniak (POL) (38); W 6–2	Kanie (JPN) (6); L 0–6	Did not advance				
Cheng Ming; Fang Yuting; Xu Jing	Team	1946	7	—N/a		Italy (10); W 200–199	United States (2); W 218–213	Russia (6); W 208–207	South Korea (1); L 209–210	2nd place, silver medalist(s)

== Athletics ==
Prior to the 2012 Olympics, Chinese athletes achieved qualifying standards in the following athletics events (up to a maximum of 3 athletes in each event at the 'A' Standard, and 1 at the 'B' Standard):

Key

- Note–Ranks given for track events are within the athlete's heat only
- Q = Qualified for the next round
- q = Qualified for the next round as a fastest loser or, in field events, by position without achieving the qualifying target
- NR = National record
- N/A = Round not applicable for the event
- Bye = Athlete not required to compete in round

Men
Track & road events

Athlete	Event	Heat		Quarterfinal		Semifinal		Final	
Athlete	Event	Result	Rank	Result	Rank	Result	Rank	Result	Rank
Su Bingtian	100 m	Bye		10.19	3 Q	10.28	8	did not advance	
Xie Zhenye	200 m	20.69	6	—N/a		did not advance			
Liu Xiang	110 m hurdles	DNF		—N/a		did not advance			
Shi Dongpeng	110 m hurdles	13.78	7	—N/a		did not advance			
Xie Wenjun	110 m hurdles	13.43	3 Q	—N/a		13.34	3	did not advance	
Cheng Wen	400 m hurdles	50.38	6	—N/a		did not advance			
Li Zhilong	400 m hurdles	50.36	7	—N/a		did not advance			
Guo Fan; Lao Yi; Liang Jiahong; Su Bingtian; Zhang Peimeng; Zheng Dongsheng	4 × 100 m relay	38.38 NR	5	—N/a				did not advance	
Dong Guojian	Marathon	—N/a						2:20:39	54
Li Zicheng	Marathon	—N/a						DNF	
Cai Zilin	20 km walk	—N/a						1:19:44	4
Chen Ding	20 km walk	—N/a						1:18:46 OR	1st place, gold medalist(s)
Wang Zhen	20 km walk	—N/a						1:19:25	3rd place, bronze medalist(s)
Li Jianbo	50 km walk	—N/a						3:39:01	4
Si Tianfeng	50 km walk	—N/a						3:37:16	2nd place, silver medalist(s)
Zhao Jianguo	50 km walk	—N/a						3:56:59	34

Field events

Athlete	Event	Qualification		Final	
Athlete	Event	Distance	Position	Distance	Position
Li Jinzhe	Long jump	7.77	20	did not advance	
Zhang Xiaoyi	Long jump	7.25	36	did not advance	
Cao Shuo	Triple jump	16.27	20	did not advance	
Dong Bin	Triple jump	16.94	5 q	16.75	10
Zhang Guowei	High jump	2.21	=21	did not advance	
Yang Yansheng	Pole vault	5.35	=20	did not advance	
Zhang Jun	Shot put	NM	—	did not advance	
Qin Qiang	Javelin throw	72.29	41	did not advance	

Women
Track & road events

Athlete	Event	Heat		Quarterfinal		Semifinal		Final	
Athlete	Event	Result	Rank	Result	Rank	Result	Rank	Result	Rank
Wei Yongli	100 m	Bye		11.48	7	did not advance			
Sun Yawei	100 m hurdles	13.26	5	—N/a		did not advance			
Huang Xiaoxiao	400 m hurdles	56.29	6	—N/a		did not advance			
Li Zhenzhu	3000 m steeplechase	9:34.29	7	—N/a				did not advance	
Yin Annuo	3000 m steeplechase	10:09.10	14	—N/a				did not advance	
Wang Jiali	Marathon	—N/a						2:35:46	58
Wang Xueqin	Marathon	—N/a						2:28:21	22
Zhu Xiaolin	Marathon	—N/a						2:24:48	6
Liu Hong	20 km walk	—N/a						1:26:00	2nd place, silver medalist(s)
Lu Xiuzhi	20 km walk	—N/a						1:26:26	3rd place, bronze medalist(s)
Qieyang Shijie	20 km walk	—N/a						1:25:16 AR	1st place, gold medalist(s)

Field events

Athlete	Event	Qualification		Final	
Athlete	Event	Distance	Position	Distance	Position
Li Yanmei	Triple jump	13.43	30	did not advance	
Xie Limei	Triple jump	13.69	23	did not advance	
Zheng Xingjuan	High jump	1.90	18	did not advance	
Li Ling^{1}	Pole vault	4.25	30	did not advance	
Gong Lijiao	Shot put	19.11	5 Q	20.22	2nd place, silver medalist(s)
Li Ling^{2}	Shot put	19.23	4 Q	19.63	3rd place, bronze medalist(s)
Liu Xiangrong	Shot put	18.96	6 Q	19.18	5
Li Yanfeng	Discus throw	64.48	6 Q	67.22	2nd place, silver medalist(s)
Ma Xuejun	Discus throw	62.66	11 q	61.02	10
Tan Jian	Discus throw	NM	—	did not advance	
Li Lingwei	Javelin throw	56.50	30	did not advance	
Lü Huihui	Javelin throw	64.45	5 Q	63.70	5
Zhang Li	Javelin throw	58.35	23	did not advance	
Zhang Wenxiu	Hammer throw	74.53	2 Q	76.34	3rd place, bronze medalist(s)

On 1 May 2013, the IOC stripped Russian discus thrower Darya Pishchalnikova of her silver medal in the women's discus throw after testing positive for Oxandrolone (an anabolic steroid). China's Li Yanfeng was elevated to silver.

== Badminton ==
China won 12 quotas with 17 athletes for the 2012 Olympics.

Men

Athlete	Event	Group Stage				Elimination	Quarterfinal	Semifinal	Final / BM	
Athlete	Event	Opposition Score	Opposition Score	Opposition Score	Rank	Opposition Score	Opposition Score	Opposition Score	Opposition Score	Rank
Chen Jin	Singles	Wacha (POL); W (21–15, 21–8)	—N/a		1 Q	Zwiebler (GER); W (19–21, 21–12, 21–19)	Lee H-i (KOR); L (15–21, 16–21)	did not advance		
Chen Long	Singles	Ponsana (THA); W (21–12, 21–17)	—N/a		1 Q	Wong W K (HKG); W (21–17, 21–17)	Gade (DEN); W (21–16, 21–13)	Lee C W (MAS); L (13–21, 14–21)	Lee H-i (KOR); W (21–12, 15–21, 21–15)	3rd place, bronze medalist(s)
Lin Dan	Singles	Evans (IRL); W (21–8, 21–14)	—N/a		1 Q	Hidayat (INA); W (21–9, 21–13)	Sasaki (JPN); W (21–12, 16–21, 21–13)	Lee H-i (KOR); W (21–12, 21–10)	Lee C W (MAS); W (15–21, 21–10, 21–19)	1st place, gold medalist(s)
Cai Yun; Fu Haifeng	Doubles	Kindervater / Schöttler (GER); W (22–20, 21–16)	Smith / Warfe (AUS); W (21–17, 21–11)	Fang C-m / Lee S-m (TPE); W (21–19, 21–13)	1 Q	—N/a	Chai B / Guo Zd (CHN); W (21–15, 21–19)	Koo K K / Tan B H (MAS); W (21–9, 21–19)	Boe / Mogensen (DEN); W (21–16, 21–15)	1st place, gold medalist(s)
Chai Biao; Guo Zhendong	Doubles	James / Viljoen (RSA); W (21–8, 21–13)	Ivanov / Sozonov (RUS); W (23–21, 21–15)	Boe / Mogensen (DEN); L (14–21, 19–21)	1 Q	—N/a	Cai Y / Fu Hf (CHN); L (15–21, 19–21)	did not advance		

Women

Athlete	Event	Group Stage				Elimination	Quarterfinal	Semifinal	Final / BM	
Athlete	Event	Opposition Score	Opposition Score	Opposition Score	Rank	Opposition Score	Opposition Score	Opposition Score	Opposition Score	Rank
Li Xuerui	Singles	Marín (ESP); W (21–13, 21–11)	Rivero (PER); W (21–5, 21–6)	—N/a	1 Q	Tai T-z (TPE); W (21–16, 23–21)	Yip P Y (HKG); W (21–12, 22–20)	Wang X (CHN); W (22–20, 21–28)	Wang Y (CHN); W (21–15, 21–23 21–17)	1st place, gold medalist(s)
Wang Xin	Singles	Wang (USA); W (21–8, 21–6)	—N/a		1 Q	Firdasari (INA); W (21–15, 21–8)	Intanon (THA); W (17–21, 21–18, 21–14)	Li X (CHN); L (20–22, 18–21)	Nehwal (IND); L (21–18, 1–0^{ret})	4
Wang Yihan	Singles	Li (CAN); W (21–8, 21–16)	—N/a		1 Q	Bae Y-j (KOR); W (15–21, 21–14, 21–14)	Cheng S-c (TPE); W (21–14, 21–11)	Nehwal (IND); W (21–13, 21–13)	Li X (CHN); L (15–21, 23–21, 17–21)	2nd place, silver medalist(s)
Tian Qing; Zhao Yunlei	Doubles	Maeda / Suetsuna (JPN); W (21–16, 21–17)	Juhl / Pedersen (DEN); L (20–22, 12–21)	Poon L Y / Tse Y S (HKG); W (21–11, 21–12)	2 Q	—N/a	Cheng W-h / Chien Y-c (TPE); W (21–10, 21–14)	Sorokina / Vislova (RUS); W (21–19, 21–6)	Fujii / Kakiiwa (JPN); W (21–10, 25–23)	1st place, gold medalist(s)
Wang Xiaoli; Yu Yang	Doubles	Jung K-e / Kim H-n (KOR); L (14–21, 11–21)	Sorokina / Vislova (RUS); W (21–6, 21–9)	Bruce / Li (CAN); W (21–11, 21–7)	2 Q	Disqualified – match fixing				

Mixed

Athlete	Event	Group Stage				Quarterfinal	Semifinal	Final / BM	
Athlete	Event	Opposition Score	Opposition Score	Opposition Score	Rank	Opposition Score	Opposition Score	Opposition Score	Rank
Ma Jin; Xu Chen	Doubles	Prapakamol / Thungthongkam (THA); W (21–19, 21–12)	Chan P S / Goh L Y (MAS); W (21–14, 21–8)	Chen H-l / Cheng W-h (TPE); W (21–16, 22–20)	1 Q	Mateusiak / Zięba (POL); W (21–19, 21–16, 23–21)	Ahmad / Natsir (INA); W (21–23, 21–18, 21–13)	Zhang N / Zhao Yl (CHN); L (11–21, 17–21)	2nd place, silver medalist(s)
Zhang Nan; Zhao Yunlei	Doubles	Nikolaenko / Sorokina (RUS); W (21–18, 21–9)	Adcock / Bankier (GBR); W (21–13, 21–14)	Fuchs / Michels (GER); W (21–6, 21–7)	1 Q	Laybourn / Juhl (DEN); W (21–13, 21–17)	Nielsen / Pedersen (DEN); W (17–21, 21–17, 21–19)	Xu C / Ma J (CHN); W (21–11, 21–17)	1st place, gold medalist(s)

== Basketball ==
China's male and female basketball teams both qualified for the 2012 Olympic Games.

- Men's team event – 1 team of 12 players
- Women's team event – 1 team of 12 players

=== Men's tournament ===
Roster

The following is the China roster in the men's basketball tournament of the 2012 Summer Olympics.

China men's national basketball team – 2012 Summer Olympics roster
Players
Coaches

Pos.	No.	Name	Age – Date of birth	Height	Club
PF	4	Ding Jinhui	22 – 27 October 1989	2.04 m (6 ft 8 in)	Zhejiang Golden Bulls
PG	5	Liu Wei (C)	32 – 15 January 1980	1.90 m (6 ft 3 in)	Shanghai Sharks
SF	6	Yi Li	26 – 7 November 1985	2.03 m (6 ft 8 in)	Jiangsu Dragons
SG	7	Wang Shipeng	29 – 6 April 1983	1.96 m (6 ft 5 in)	Guangdong Southern Tigers
SF	8	Zhu Fangyu	29 – 5 January 1983	2.01 m (6 ft 7 in)	Guangdong Southern Tigers
SG	9	Sun Yue	26 – 6 November 1985	2.05 m (6 ft 9 in)	Beijing Olympians
C	10	Zhang Zhaoxu	24 – 18 November 1987	2.21 m (7 ft 3 in)	Shanghai Sharks
PF	11	Yi Jianlian	24 – 27 October 1987	2.12 m (6 ft 11 in)	Dallas Mavericks
PG	12	Guo Ailun	18 – 14 November 1993	1.92 m (6 ft 4 in)	Liaoning Dinosaurs
PG	13	Chen Jianghua	23 – 12 March 1989	1.88 m (6 ft 2 in)	Guangdong Southern Tigers
C	14	Wang Zhizhi	35 – 8 July 1977	2.14 m (7 ft 0 in)	Bayi Rockets
SF	15	Zhou Peng	22 – 11 October 1989	2.06 m (6 ft 9 in)	Guangdong Southern Tigers

Head coach

- Bob Donewald

Assistant coach(es)

- Li Nan
- Peter Philo

Legend

- Club – describes last
  club before the tournament
- Age – describes age
  on 29 July 2012

Group play

Pos	Team	Pld	W	L	PF	PA	PD	Pts	Qualification
1	Russia	5	4	1	400	359	+41	9 (Note: Head-to-head record: Russia 1–0 Brazil)	Quarterfinals
2	Brazil	5	4	1	402	349	+53	9	Quarterfinals
3	Spain	5	3	2	414	394	+20	8 (Note: Head-to-head record: Spain 1–0 Australia)	Quarterfinals
4	Australia	5	3	2	410	373	+37	8	Quarterfinals
5	Great Britain (H)	5	1	4	380	405	−25	6	
6	China	5	0	5	313	439	−126	5	

Source: FIBA archive
Rules for classification: 1) points; 2) head-to-head points; 3) head-to-head goal average; 4) head-to-head number of points scored.
(H) Hosts
Notes:

29 July 2012
16:45

Report

Spain	97–81	China
Scoring by quarter: 19–17, 34–24, 16–19, 28–21
Pts: P. Gasol 21; Rebs: P. Gasol 11; Asts: M. Gasol 5		Pts: Yi Jianlian 30; Rebs: Yi Jianlian 12; Asts: Chen Jianghua 5

Basketball Arena, London
Referees: Luigi Lamonica (ITA), Felicia Grinter (USA), Fernando Sampietro (ARG)

31 July 2012
09:00

Report

China	54–73	Russia
Scoring by quarter: 12–20, 13–20, 14–21, 15–12
Pts: Yi Jianlian 16; Rebs: Yi Jianlian 7 Asts: Chen Jianghua 4		Pts: Kirilenko 16; Rebs: Khryapa 12; Asts: Shved, Khryapa 6

Basketball Arena, London
Referees: Saša Pukl (SLO), Robert Lottermoser (GER), Bill Kennedy (USA)

2 August 2012
11:15

Report

Australia	81–61	China
Scoring by quarter: 21–22, 28–11, 12–19, 20–9
Pts: Mills 20; Rebs: Worthington 8 Asts: Ingles 7		Pts: Wang Shipeng 21; Rebs: Yi Jianlian, Wang Zhizhi 12; Asts: Wang Shipeng 3

Basketball Arena, London
Referees: Recep Ankaralı (TUR), Pablo Estévez (ARG), Stephen Seibel (CAN)

4 August 2012
16:45

Report

China	59–98	Brazil
Scoring by quarter: 11–25, 10–17, 17–28, 21–28
Pts: Zhu Fangyu 13; Rebs: Yi Jianlian 6 Asts: Chen Jianghua 2		Pts: Vinicius 14; Rebs: Varejão 13; Asts: Taylor 6

Basketball Arena, London
Referees: Carl Jungebrand (FIN), Borys Ryschyk (UKR), Oļegs Latiševs (LAT)

6 August 2012
16:45

Report

Great Britain	90–58	China
Scoring by quarter: 27–15, 19–16, 26–17, 18–10
Pts: Achara 16; Rebs: Archibald 9 Asts: Lawrence 6		Pts: Wang Zhizhi 11; Rebs: Yi Jianlian 14; Asts: Liu Wei 4

Basketball Arena, London
Referees: Cristiano Maranho (BRA), Fernando Sampietro (ARG), Vaughan Mayberry (AUS)

=== Women's tournament ===
Roster

The following is the China roster in the women's basketball tournament of the 2012 Summer Olympics.

China women's national basketball team – 2012 Summer Olympics roster
Players
Coaches

Pos.	No.	Name	Age – Date of birth	Height	Club	Ctr.
G	4	Li Shanshan	25 – 3 March 1987	1.77 m (5 ft 10 in)	Jiangsu Phoenix	(China)
G	5	Song Xiaoyun	29 – 11 December 1982	1.75 m (5 ft 9 in)	Bayi Kylin	(China)
G	6	Ji Yanyan	27 – 29 May 1985	1.82 m (6 ft 0 in)	Heilongjiang Dragons	(China)
F	7	Zhao Shuang	22 – 21 June 1990	1.88 m (6 ft 2 in)	Shenyang Army Golden Lions	(China)
F	8	Miao Lijie	31 – 3 June 1981	1.78 m (5 ft 10 in)	Shenyang Army Golden Lions	(China)
C	9	Guan Xin	25 – 24 January 1987	1.96 m (6 ft 5 in)	Guangdong Dolphins	(China)
PF	10	Zhang Fan	27 – 22 August 1984	1.86 m (6 ft 1 in)	Beijing Great Wall	(China)
F	11	Ma Zengyu	29 – 7 May 1983	1.83 m (6 ft 0 in)	Liaoning Baocheng	(China)
PF	12	Gao Song	20 – 16 April 1992	1.90 m (6 ft 3 in)	Heilongjiang Dragons	(China)
PF	13	Chen Xiaoli	30 – 20 February 1982	1.93 m (6 ft 4 in)	Liaoning Baocheng	(China)
C	14	Wei Wei	22 – 6 October 1989	2.06 m (6 ft 9 in)	Guangdong Dolphins	(China)
C	15	Chen Nan	29 – 8 January 1983	1.95 m (6 ft 5 in)	Bayi Kylin	(China)

Head coach

- (China) Sun Fengwu

Legend

- Club – describes last
  club before the tournament
- Age – describes age
  on 28 July 2012

Group play

Pos	Team	Pld	W	L	PF	PA	PD	Pts	Qualification
1	United States	5	5	0	462	279	+183	10	Quarterfinals
2	Turkey	5	4	1	343	316	+27	9	Quarterfinals
3	China	5	3	2	346	363	−17	8	Quarterfinals
4	Czech Republic	5	2	3	346	332	+14	7	Quarterfinals
5	Croatia	5	1	4	324	379	−55	6	
6	Angola	5	0	5	243	395	−152	5	

Source: FIBA archive
Rules for classification: 1) points; 2) head-to-head points; 3) head-to-head goal average; 4) head-to-head number of points scored.

28 July 2012
09:00

Report

China	66–57	Czech Republic
Scoring by quarter: 20–16, 16–13, 15–15, 15–13
Pts: Ma Zengyu 16; Rebs: Chen Nan 8 Asts: Miao Lijie 8		Pts: Vítečková 14; Rebs: Horáková 9 Asts: three players 3

Basketball Arena, London
Referees: Jorge Vazquez (PUR), Vaughan Mayberry (AUS), Carole Delaune (FRA)

30 July 2012
09:00

Report

Croatia	58–83	China
Scoring by quarter: 21–24, 10–15, 14–25, 13–19
Pts: Mandir 22; Rebs: Ivezić 6 Asts: Jelavić, Lelas 4		Pts: Chen Nan 28; Rebs: Chen Nan 10; Asts: Miao Lijie 10

Basketball Arena, London
Referees: Michael Aylen (AUS), Elena Chernova (RUS), Felicia Grinter (USA)

1 August 2012
11:15

Report

China	76–52	Angola
Scoring by quarter: 15–13, 18–18, 24–6, 19–15
Pts: Ma Zengyu 15; Rebs: Gao Song 9 Asts: Miao Lijie 5		Pts: Guadalupe 12; Rebs: Tomas 9 Asts: three players 2

Basketball Arena, London
Referees: Christos Christodoulou (GRE), Samir Abaakil (MAR), Shenal Bendke (IND)

3 August 2012
16:45

Report

Turkey	82–55	China
Scoring by quarter: 26–13, 13–14, 20–16, 23–12
Pts: Yılmaz 16; Rebs: Hollingsworth 11; Asts: Alben 5		Pts: Ma Zengyu 7 Rebs: Ma Zengyu, Chen Nan 8 Asts: Miao Lijie 6

Basketball Arena, London
Referees: Carl Jungebrand (FIN), Felicia Grinter (USA), Vaughan Mayberry (AUS)

5 August 2012
16:45

Report

China	66–114	United States
Scoring by quarter: 28–31, 8–30, 12–33, 18–20
Pts: Song Xiaoyun 15; Rebs: four players 3 Asts: Miao Lijie 8		Pts: Taurasi 22; Rebs: Moore 7 Asts: Catchings 7

Basketball Arena, London
Referees: Guerrino Cerebuch (ITA), Borys Ryschyk (UKR), Carole Delauné (FRA)

Quarter-final

7 August 2012
16:15

Report

Australia	75–60	China
Scoring by quarter: 22–16, 13–20, 20–16, 20–8
Pts: Cambage 17; Rebs: Batkovic 9 Asts: Richards 7		Pts: Ma Zengyu 15; Rebs: Chen Nan 7 Asts: Gao Song 3

Basketball Arena, London
Referees: Oļegs Latiševs (LAT), Elena Chernova (RUS), Carole Delauné (FRA)

== Boxing ==
China qualified boxers for the following events in 2012:

Men

Athlete	Event	Round of 32	Round of 16	Quarterfinals	Semifinals	Final	
Athlete	Event	Opposition Result	Opposition Result	Opposition Result	Opposition Result	Opposition Result	Rank
Zou Shiming	Light flyweight	Bye	Veitia (CUB); W 14–11	Zhakypov (KAZ); W 13–10	Barnes (IRL); W 15^{+}–15	Pongprayoon (THA); W 13–10	1st place, gold medalist(s)
Liu Qiang	Lightweight	Jackson (AUS); W 20–7	Toledo (CUB); L 10–14	did not advance			
Maimaitituersun Qiong	Welterweight	Zamkovoy (RUS); L 11–16	did not advance				
Meng Fanlong	Light heavyweight	Sangwan (IND); W 15–14	Falcão (BRA); L 17–17^{+}	did not advance			
Wang Xuanxuan	Heavyweight	—N/a	Pulev (BUL); L 7–10	did not advance			
Zhang Zhilei	Super heavyweight	—N/a	Linde (AUS); W RSC	Joshua (GBR); L 11–15	did not advance		

Women

Athlete	Event	Round of 16	Quarterfinals	Semifinals	Final	
Athlete	Event	Opposition Result	Opposition Result	Opposition Result	Opposition Result	Rank
Ren Cancan	Flyweight	Bye	Savelyeva (RUS); W 12–7	Esparza (USA); W 10–8	Adams (GBR); L 7–16	2nd place, silver medalist(s)
Dong Cheng	Lightweight	Lăcătuș (ROU); W 10–5	Chorieva (TJK); L 8–13	did not advance		
Li Jinzi	Middleweight	Feitosa (BRA); W 19–14	Spencer (CAN); W 17–14	Torlopova (RUS); L 10–12	Did not advance	3rd place, bronze medalist(s)

== Canoeing ==
=== Slalom ===
China qualified boats for the following slalom events:

Athlete	Event	Preliminary						Semifinal		Final	
Athlete	Event	Run 1	Rank	Run 2	Rank	Best	Rank	Time	Rank	Time	Rank
Huang Cunguang	Men's K-1	94.40	14	94.54	15	94.40	17	did not advance			
Teng Zhiqiang	Men's C-1	95.68	5	96.06	7	95.68	11 Q	107.53	12	did not advance	
Hu Minghai; Shu Junrong	Men's C-2	103.36	5	99.05	2	99.05	3 Q	110.70	5 Q	112.86	6
Li Jingjing	Women's K-1	108.53	8	111.22	14	108.53	12 Q	117.02	11	did not advance	

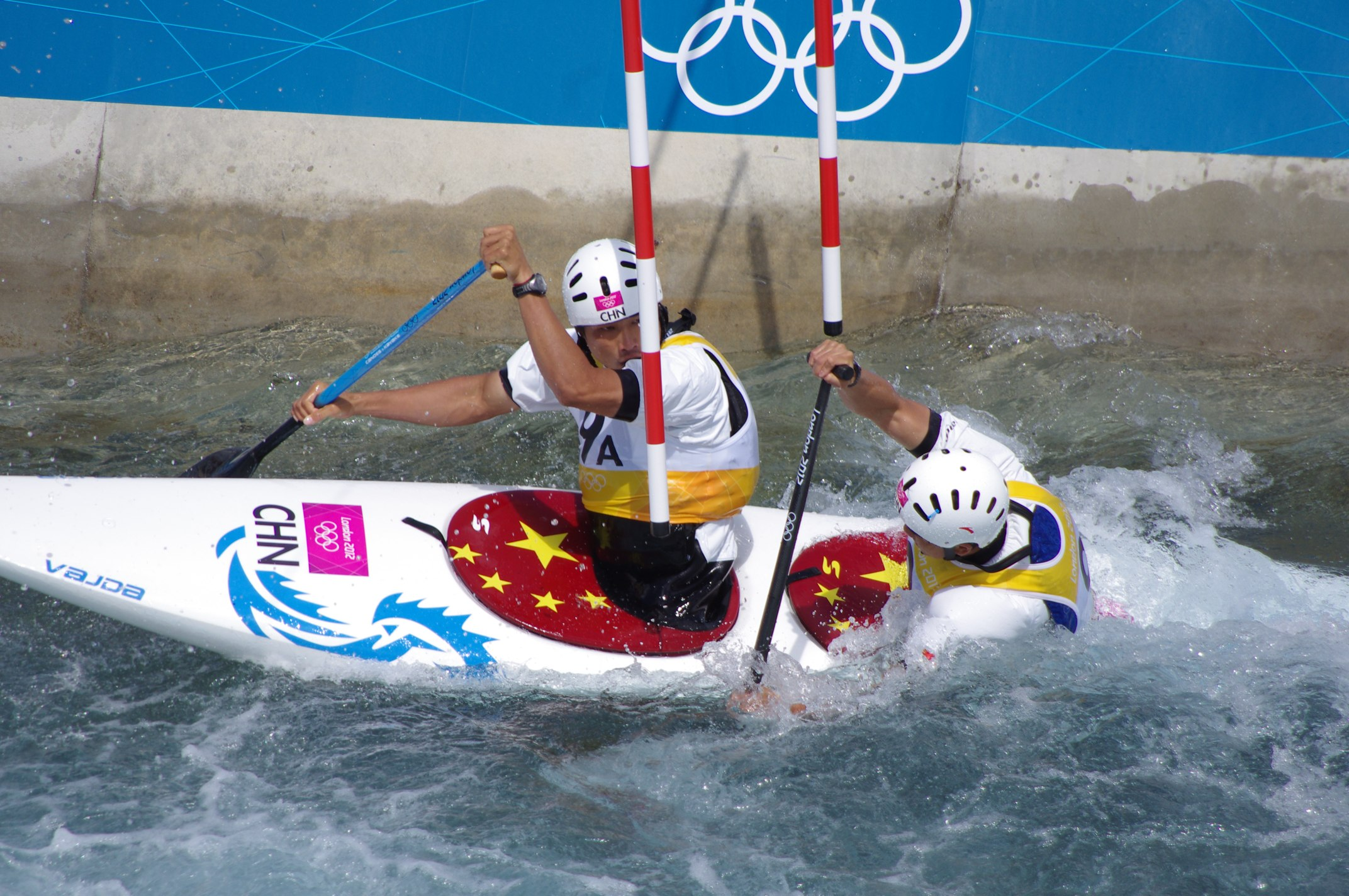
Hu Minghai and Shu Junrong (C-2)

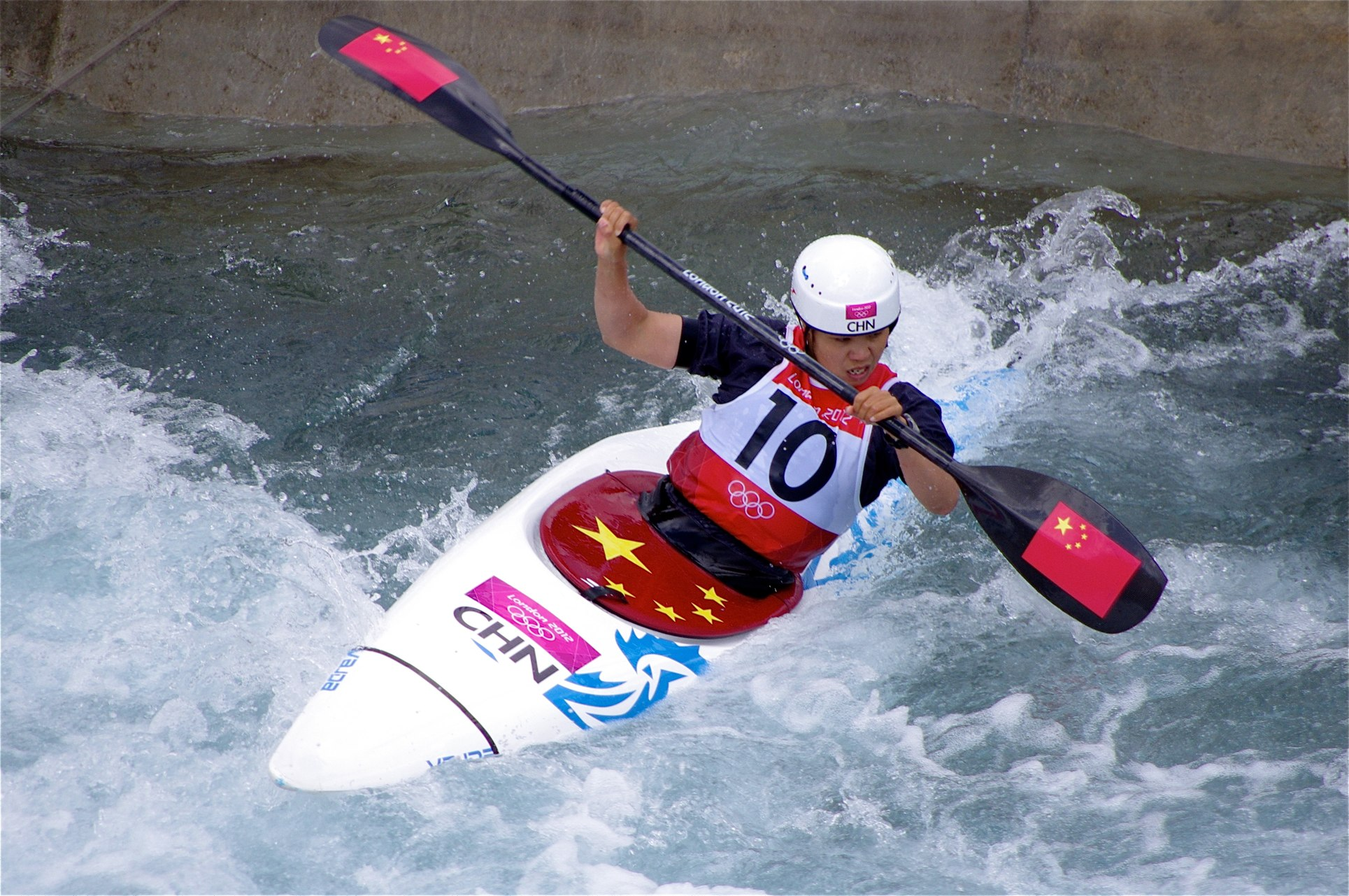
Li Jingjing (K-1)

=== Sprint ===
China qualified boats for the following sprint events:

Men

Athlete	Event	Heats		Semifinals		Final	
Athlete	Event	Time	Rank	Time	Rank	Time	Rank
Li Qiang	C-1 200 m	42.004	3 Q	42.149	3 FB	47.295	16
Zhou Yubo	K-1 200 m	38.316	5 Q	39.042	8 FB	40.157	16
Zhou Yubo	K-1 1000 m	3:36.994	4 Q	3:36.163	7 FB	3:36.110	15
Huang Maoxing; Li Qiang	C-2 1000 m	3:38.483	3 Q	3:37.746	1 FA	3:48.930	8
Zhang Hongpeng; Shen Jie; Zhou Peng; Zhou Yubo	K-4 1000 m	3:14.234	5 Q	3:00.315	8	did not advance	

Women

Athlete	Event	Heats		Semifinals		Final	
Athlete	Event	Time	Rank	Time	Rank	Time	Rank
Zhou Yu	K-1 200 m	42.885	6 Q	42.279	6	did not advance	
Wu Yanan; Zhou Yu	K-2 500 m	1:43.448	1 Q	1:41.863	1 FA	1:44.136	4
Li Zhangli; Liu Haiping; Ren Wenjun; Yu Lamei	K-4 500 m	1:40.661	4 Q	1:34.004	8	did not advance	

Qualification Legend: FA = Qualify to final (medal); FB = Qualify to final B (non-medal)

== Cycling ==
China qualified the following cyclists for the 2012 Games:

=== Road ===
Athlete	Event	Time	Rank
Liu Xin	Women's road race	OTL	

=== Track ===
Sprint

Athlete	Event	Qualification		Round 1	Repechage 1	Round 2	Repechage 2	Quarterfinals	Semifinals	Final	
Athlete	Event	Time Speed (km/h)	Rank	Opposition Time Speed (km/h)	Opposition Time Speed (km/h)	Opposition Time Speed (km/h)	Opposition Time Speed (km/h)	Opposition Time Speed (km/h)	Opposition Time Speed (km/h)	Opposition Time Speed (km/h)	Rank
Zhang Miao	Men's sprint	10.155; 70.901	8	Awang (MAS); L	Esterhuizen (RSA); Mazquiarán (ESP); L	did not advance					
Guo Shuang	Women's sprint	11.020; 65.335	3	Larreal (VEN); W 11.371; 63.318	Bye	Hansen (NZL); W 11.431; 62.986	Bye	Guerra (CUB); W 11.283, W 11.337	Meares (AUS); L	Vogel (GER); W 11.532, W 11.591	3rd place, bronze medalist(s)

Team sprint

Athlete	Event	Qualification		Semifinals		Final	
Athlete	Event	Time Speed (km/h)	Rank	Opposition Time Speed (km/h)	Rank	Opposition Time Speed (km/h)	Rank
Cheng Changsong; Zhang Lei; Zhang Miao	Men's team sprint	43.751; 61.712	6 Q	Australia; L 43.505; 62.061	6	did not advance	
Gong Jinjie; Guo Shuang	Women's team sprint	32.447 WR; 55.475	1 Q	Venezuela; W 32.422 WR; 55.517	1 Q	Germany; L REL	2nd place, silver medalist(s)

Pursuit

Athlete	Event	Qualification		Semifinals		Final	
Athlete	Event	Time	Rank	Opponent Results	Rank	Opponent Results	Rank
Jiang Fan; Jiang Wenwen; Liang Jing	Women's team pursuit	3:26.049	10	did not advance			

Keirin

Athlete	Event	1st round	Repechage	2nd round	Final
Athlete	Event	Rank	Rank	Rank	Rank
Zhang Miao	Men's keirin	6 R	6	Did not advance	17
Guo Shuang	Women's keirin	1 Q	Bye	3 Q	2nd place, silver medalist(s)

Omnium

Athlete	Event	Flying lap		Points race		Elimination race	Individual pursuit		Scratch race	Time trial		Total points	Rank
Athlete	Event	Time	Rank	Points	Rank	Rank	Time	Rank	Rank	Time	Rank	Total points	Rank
Huang Li	Women's omnium	14.571	9	2	15	16	3:45.610	13	8	36.315	6	67	12

=== Mountain biking ===
Athlete	Event	Time	Rank
Tong Weisong	Men's cross-country	LAP (3 laps)	41
Shi Qinglan	Women's cross-country	1:35:28	12

== Diving ==
The Chinese diving team qualified 12 divers across all diving events at the 2012 Olympics through the 2011 World Aquatics Championships.

Men

Athlete	Event	Preliminaries		Semifinals		Final	
Athlete	Event	Points	Rank	Points	Rank	Points	Rank
He Chong	3 m springboard	500.90	2 Q	510.15	1 Q	524.15	3rd place, bronze medalist(s)
Qin Kai	3 m springboard	451.60	11 Q	500.35	3 Q	541.75	2nd place, silver medalist(s)
Lin Yue	10 m platform	532.15	2 Q	541.80	2 Q	527.30	6
Qiu Bo	10 m platform	563.70	1 Q	563.55	1 Q	566.85	2nd place, silver medalist(s)
Luo Yutong; Qin Kai	3 m synchronized springboard	—N/a				477.00	1st place, gold medalist(s)
Cao Yuan; Zhang Yanquan	10 m synchronized platform	—N/a				486.78	1st place, gold medalist(s)

Women

Athlete	Event	Preliminaries		Semifinals		Final	
Athlete	Event	Points	Rank	Points	Rank	Points	Rank
He Zi	3 m springboard	363.85	2 Q	354.50	3 Q	379.20	2nd place, silver medalist(s)
Wu Minxia	3 m springboard	387.75	1 Q	394.40	1 Q	414.00	1st place, gold medalist(s)
Chen Ruolin	10 m platform	392.35	1 Q	407.25	1 Q	422.30	1st place, gold medalist(s)
Hu Yadan	10 m platform	337.85	6 Q	328.25	9 Q	349.50	9
He Zi; Wu Minxia	3 m synchronized springboard	—N/a				346.20	1st place, gold medalist(s)
Chen Ruolin; Wang Hao	10 m synchronized platform	—N/a				368.40	1st place, gold medalist(s)

== Fencing ==
China qualified 13 fencers for nine events at the 2012 Olympics.

Men

Athlete	Event	Round of 64	Round of 32	Round of 16	Quarterfinal	Semifinal	Final / BM	
Athlete	Event	Opposition Score	Opposition Score	Opposition Score	Opposition Score	Opposition Score	Opposition Score	Rank
Li Guojie	Individual épée	—N/a	Kelsey (USA); L 7–8	did not advance				
Lei Sheng	Individual foil	Bye	Schlosser (AUT); W 15–9	Sintes (FRA); W 15–6	Aspromonte (ITA); W 15–8	Baldini (ITA); W 15–11	Abouelkassem (EGY); W 15–13	1st place, gold medalist(s)
Ma Jianfei	Individual foil	Bye	Gómez (MEX); W 15–9	Akhmatkhuzin (RUS); W 15–11	Choi B-c (KOR); L 13–15	did not advance		
Zhu Jun	Individual foil	Shaito (LIB); W 15–2	Choi B-c (KOR); L 13–15	did not advance				
Lei Sheng; Ma Jianfei; Zhang Liangliang; Zhu Jun	Team foil	—N/a			Japan (7); L 30–45	Classification semi-final Russia (2012 Summer); L 40–45	7th place final France (2012 Summer); W 45–33	7
Liu Xiao	Individual sabre	Bye	Occhiuzzi (ITA); L 9–15	did not advance				
Wang Jingzhi	Individual sabre	Bye	Won W-y (KOR); L 6–15	did not advance				
Zhong Man	Individual sabre	Bye	Kim J-h (KOR); W 15–14	Szilágyi (HUN); L 10–15	did not advance			
Jiang Kelu; Liu Xiao; Wang Jingzhi; Zhong Man	Team sabre	—N/a			Romania (2012 Summer); L 30–45	Classification semi-final United States (2012 Summer) (8); W 45–28	5th place final Germany (2012 Summer) (3); L 30–45	6

Women

Athlete	Event	Round of 64	Round of 32	Round of 16	Quarterfinal	Semifinal	Final / BM	
Athlete	Event	Opposition Score	Opposition Score	Opposition Score	Opposition Score	Opposition Score	Opposition Score	Rank
Li Na	Individual épée	Bye	Pantelyeyeva (UKR); W 15–10	Heidemann (GER); L 13–14	did not advance			
Luo Xiaojuan	Individual épée	Bye	Besbes (TUN); L 9–15	did not advance				
Sun Yujie	Individual épée	Bye	Duplitzer (GER); W 15–10	Géroudet (SUI); W 15–10	Fiamingo (ITA); W 15–14	Shemyakina (UKR); L 13–14	Shin A-L (KOR); W 15–11	3rd place, bronze medalist(s)
Li Na; Luo Xiaojuan; Sun Yujie; Xu Anqi	Team épée	—N/a			Germany; W 45–42	Russia; W 20–19	South Korea; W 39–25	1st place, gold medalist(s)
Chen Jinyan	Individual foil	Bye	Wojtkowiak (POL); W 15–8	Vezzali (ITA); L 6–15	did not advance			
Chen Xiaodong	Individual sabre	—N/a	Ben Chaabane (TUN); W 15–12	Vecchi (ITA); L 10–15	did not advance			
Zhu Min	Individual sabre	—N/a	Pascu (ROU); W 15–10	Gavrilova (RUS); W 15–11	Zagunis (USA); L 6–15	did not advance		

== Field hockey ==
The Chinese women's hockey team qualified a team of 16 players for the 2012 Olympics, by virtue of winning the 2010 Asian Games hockey title.

=== Women's tournament ===
Roster

The following is the Chinese roster in the women's field hockey tournament of the 2012 Summer Olympics.

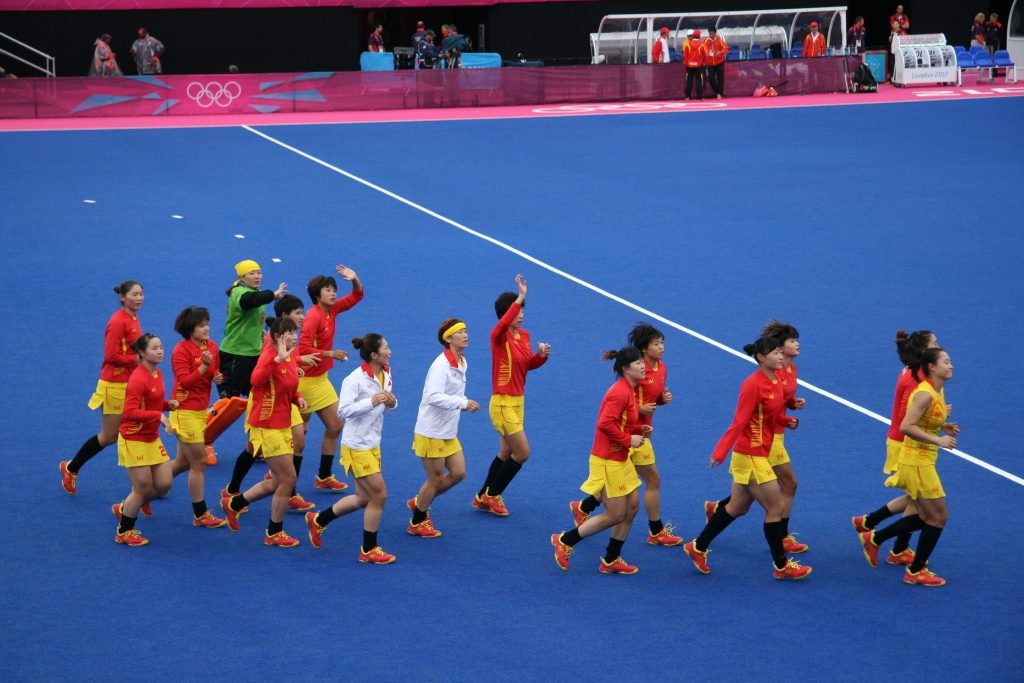
China women's hockey team, after the match against Belgium

1. Ma Yibo
2. Wang Mengyu
5. Ma Wei
6. Sun Sinan
7. Cui Qiuxia
8. Fu Baorong
10. Gao Lihua
16. Zhang Yimeng (GK)
17. Li Hongxia
18. Ren Ye (C)
21. Zhao Yudiao
22. Song Qingling
23. De Jiaojiao
25. Xu Xiaoxu
28. Liang Meiyu
29. Peng Yang

Reserves:

- Li Dongxiao (GK)
- Tang Chunling

Group play

Pos	Team	Pld	W	D	L	GF	GA	GD	Pts	Qualification
1	Netherlands	5	5	0	0	12	5	+7	15	Semi-finals
2	Great Britain (H)	5	3	0	2	14	7	+7	9	Semi-finals
3	China	5	2	1	2	6	3	+3	7	
4	South Korea	5	2	0	3	9	13	−4	6	
5	Japan	5	1	1	3	4	9	−5	4	
6	Belgium	5	0	2	3	2	10	−8	2	

Source: FIH
Rules for classification: 1) Points; 2) Matches won; 3) Goal difference; 4) Goals for; 5) Head-to-head result.
(H) Hosts

29 July 2012
13:45

China	4–0	South Korea
Ma Yibo 26', 67'; Zhao Yudiao 51'; Li Hongxia 54'	Report

Umpires:
Frances Block (GBR)
Julie Ashton-Lucy (AUS)

31 July 2012
13:45

Belgium	0–0	China
	Report

Umpires:
Kelly Hudson (NZL)
Carolina de la Fuente (ARG)

2 August 2012
13:45

China	0–1	Netherlands
	Report	Goderie 10'

Umpires:
Michelle Joubert (RSA)
Chieko Soma (JPN)

4 August 2012
16:00

China	2–1	Great Britain
Fu Baorong 41'; Zhao Yudiao 47'	Report	Cullen 69'

Umpires:
Soledad Iparraguirre (ARG)
Carol Metchette (IRL)

6 August 2012
13:45

Japan	1–0	China
Komazawa 54'	Report

Umpires:
Elena Eskina (RUS)
Kelly Hudson (NZL)

5th/6th place

10 August 2012
11:30

China	0–2	Australia
	Report	Schulz 41'; Close 60'

Umpires:
Frances Block (GBR)
Michelle Joubert (RSA)

== Gymnastics ==
A total of 15 Chinese gymnasts competed at the 2012 Olympics.

=== Artistic ===
Men's team

Athlete	Event	Qualification								Final							
Athlete	Event	Apparatus						Total	Rank	Apparatus						Total	Rank
Athlete	Event	F	PH	R	V	PB	HB	Total	Rank	F	PH	R	V	PB	HB	Total	Rank
Chen Yibing	Team	—N/a	14.466	15.858 Q	—N/a	12.900	—N/a			—N/a	14.733	15.800	—N/a				
Feng Zhe	Team	14.433	—N/a	14.866	16.100	15.633 Q	15.000	—N/a		14.400	—N/a	14.533	16.216	15.950	15.000	—N/a	
Guo Weiyang	Team	12.266	13.266	14.400	15.300	13.966	14.933	84.131	29	—N/a	14.600	14.566	—N/a	15.200	—N/a		
Zhang Chenglong	Team	14.666	13.133	—N/a	16.233	15.366 Q	15.933 Q	—N/a		14.900	14.500	—N/a	16.200	15.600	15.666	—N/a	
Zou Kai	Team	15.833 Q	12.533	—N/a	15.200	—N/a	15.533 Q	—N/a		15.833	—N/a		15.900	—N/a	16.400	—N/a	
Total	Team	44.932	40.865	45.124	47.633	44.965	46.466	269.985	6 Q	45.133	43.833	44.899	48.316	46.750	47.066	275.997	1st place, gold medalist(s)

Men's individual finals

Athlete	Event	Apparatus						Total	Rank
Athlete	Event	F	PH	R	V	PB	HB	Total	Rank
Chen Yibing	Rings	—N/a		15.800	—N/a			15.800	2nd place, silver medalist(s)
Feng Zhe	Parallel bars	—N/a				15.966	—N/a	15.966	1st place, gold medalist(s)
Zhang Chenglong	Horizontal bar	—N/a					16.266	16.266	4
Zhang Chenglong	Parallel bars	—N/a				13.808	—N/a	13.808	9
Zou Kai	Floor	15.933	—N/a					15.933	1st place, gold medalist(s)
Zou Kai	Horizontal bar	—N/a					16.366	16.366	3rd place, bronze medalist(s)

Women's team

Athlete	Event	Qualification						Final					
Athlete	Event	Apparatus				Total	Rank	Apparatus				Total	Rank
Athlete	Event	F	V	UB	BB	Total	Rank	F	V	UB	BB	Total	Rank
Deng Linlin	Team	13.833	14.833	14.166	15.166 Q	57.998	6 Q	14.900	—N/a	13.766	13.733	—N/a	
He Kexin	Team	—N/a	13.733	15.966 Q	—N/a			—N/a	15.766	—N/a			
Huang Qiushuang	Team	13.575	15.000	15.266	13.866	57.707	10 Q	15.033	15.100	13.800	12.500	—N/a	
Sui Lu	Team	14.233	—N/a		15.400 Q	—N/a		—N/a		15.366	14.600	—N/a	
Yao Jinnan	Team	13.066	13.133	15.766 Q	12.833	54.798	22	14.333	15.533	—N/a			
Total	Team	41.641	43.566	46.998	44.432	176.637	3 Q	44.266	46.399	42.932	40.833	174.430	4

Women's individual finals

Athlete	Event	Apparatus				Total	Rank
Athlete	Event	F	V	UB	BB	Total	Rank
Deng Linlin	All-around	14.900	14.266	15.300	13.933	58.399	6
Deng Linlin	Balance beam	—N/a			15.600	15.600	1st place, gold medalist(s)
He Kexin	Uneven bars	—N/a		15.933	—N/a	15.933	2nd place, silver medalist(s)
Huang Qiushuang	All-around	14.916	15.133	14.133	13.933	58.115	7
Sui Lu	Balance beam	—N/a			15.500	15.500	2nd place, silver medalist(s)
Yao Jinnan	Uneven bars	—N/a		15.766	—N/a	15.766	4

=== Rhythmic ===
Athlete	Event	Qualification						Final					
Athlete	Event	Hoop	Ball	Clubs	Ribbon	Total	Rank	Hoop	Ball	Clubs	Ribbon	Total	Rank
Deng Senyue	Individual	27.150	26.800	27.575	27.300	108.825	11	did not advance					

=== Trampoline ===
Athlete	Event	Qualification		Final	
Athlete	Event	Score	Rank	Score	Rank
Dong Dong	Men's	112.895	1 Q	62.990	1st place, gold medalist(s)
Lu Chunlong	Men's	112.299	3 Q	61.319	3rd place, bronze medalist(s)
He Wenna	Women's	105.500	1 Q	55.950	3rd place, bronze medalist(s)
Huang Shanshan	Women's	104.759	2 Q	56.730	2nd place, silver medalist(s)

== Judo ==
Eight Chinese athletes – one man and seven women – competed in the Olympic judo events.

Men

Athlete	Event	Round of 64	Round of 32	Round of 16	Quarterfinals	Semifinals	Repechage	Final / BM	
Athlete	Event	Opposition Result	Opposition Result	Opposition Result	Opposition Result	Opposition Result	Opposition Result	Opposition Result	Rank
A Lamusi	−60 kg	Bye	Guédez (VEN); L 0000-0111	did not advance					

Women

Athlete	Event	Round of 32	Round of 16	Quarterfinals	Semifinals	Repechage	Final / BM	
Athlete	Event	Opposition Result	Opposition Result	Opposition Result	Opposition Result	Opposition Result	Opposition Result	Rank
Wu Shugen	−48 kg	Bye	Kearney (IRL); W 1011–0012	Menezes (BRA); L 0002–0011	Did not advance	Csernoviczki (HUN); L 0002–0021	Did not advance	7
He Hongmei	−52 kg	Gneto (FRA); L 0012–0111	did not advance					
Wang Hui	−57 kg	Căprioriu (ROU); L 0000–0102	did not advance					
Xu Lili	−63 kg	Silva (BRA); W 0101–0001	Gwend (ITA); W 0211–0002	Willeboordse (NED); W 1000–0001	Joung D-w (KOR); W 0011–0002	Bye	Žolnir (SLO); L 0011–0100	2nd place, silver medalist(s)
Chen Fei	−70 kg	Klys (POL); W 1001–0000	Miled (TUN); W 1000–0001	Tachimoto (JPN); W 0020–0020 YUS	Thiele (GER); L 0000–0001	Bye	Alvear (COL); L 0001–0011	5
Yang Xiuli	−78 kg	Bye	Aung (MYA); W 0100–0000	Tcheuméo (FRA); L 0001–0101	Did not advance	Verkerk (NED); L 0000–0000 YUS	Did not advance	7
Tong Wen	+78 kg	Zambotti (MEX); W 0100–0000	Sadkowska (POL); W 0101–0000	Kindzerska (UKR); W 0100–0000	Ortiz (CUB); L 0001–0010	Bye	Altheman (BRA); W 0100–0001	3rd place, bronze medalist(s)

== Modern pentathlon ==
Based on their results at the 2011 Asian/Oceania Championships, four Chinese pentathletes qualified for the 2012 games. Cao Zhongrong and Wang Guan earned places in the men's event, while Chen Qian and Miao Yihua earned places in the women's event.

Athlete	Event	Fencing (épée one touch)			Swimming (200 m freestyle)			Riding (show jumping)			Combined: shooting/running (10 m air pistol/3000 m)			Total points	Final rank
Athlete	Event	Results	Rank	MP points	Time	Rank	MP points	Penalties	Rank	MP points	Time	Rank	MP Points	Total points	Final rank
Cao Zhongrong	Men's	25–10	=2	1000	1:58.93	3	1376	120	27	1080	10:38.02	9	2448	5904	2nd place, silver medalist(s)
Wang Guan	Men's	12–23	=34	688	2:12.13	32	1216	DNS	36	0	did not finish			1904	36
Chen Qian	Women's	21–14	=6	904	2:17.77	14	1148	80	22	1120	11:52.20	3	2152	5324	5
Miao Yihua	Women's	20–15	=8	880	2:19.31	21	1132	64	17	1136	12:26.31	20	2016	5164	14

== Rowing ==
Men

Athlete	Event	Heats		Repechage		Quarterfinals		Semifinals		Final	
Athlete	Event	Time	Rank	Time	Rank	Time	Rank	Time	Rank	Time	Rank
Zhang Liang	Single sculls	6:50.71	2 QF	Bye		7:02.03	3 SA/B	7:31.52	5 FB	7:25.64	11
Sun Jie; Zhang Fangbing	Lightweight double sculls	6:57.67	4 R	6:40.12	3 SC/D	—N/a		7:09.39	2 FC	6:49.39	15
Huang Zhe; Wang Tiexin; Yu Chenggang; Zhang Guolin	Lightweight four	5:52.58	3 SA/B	Bye		—N/a		6:08.47	6 FB	6:11.33	10

Women

Athlete	Event	Heats		Repechage		Quarterfinals		Semifinals		Final	
Athlete	Event	Time	Rank	Time	Rank	Time	Rank	Time	Rank	Time	Rank
Zhang Xiuyun	Single sculls	7:21.49	1 QF	Bye		7:39.58	1 SA/B	7:45.58	2 FA	8:03.10	6
Gao Yulan; Zhang Yage	Pair	7:13.38	3 R	7:15.18	3 FA	—N/a				7:55.18	7
Wang Min; Zhu Weiwei	Double sculls	6:50.64	3 R	7:09.65	1 FA	—N/a				7:08.92	4
Huang Wenyi; Xu Dongxiang	Lightweight double sculls	7:15.57	1 SA/B	Bye		—N/a		7:10.39	1 FA	7:11.93	2nd place, silver medalist(s)
Jin Ziwei; Tang Bin; Tian Liang; Zhang Yangyang	Quadruple sculls	6:24.32	4 R	6:21.98	4 FA	—N/a				6:44.19	5

Qualification Legend: FA=Final A (medal); FB=Final B (non-medal); FC=Final C (non-medal); FD=Final D (non-medal); FE=Final E (non-medal); FF=Final F (non-medal); SA/B=Semifinals A/B; SC/D=Semifinals C/D; SE/F=Semifinals E/F; QF=Quarterfinals; R=Repechage

== Sailing ==
China qualified one boat for each of the following events:

Men

Athlete	Event	Race											Net points	Final rank
Athlete	Event	1	2	3	4	5	6	7	8	9	10	M*	Net points	Final rank
Wang Aichen	RS:X	21	23	18	19	3	23	10	~~27~~	22	14	EL	153	18
Shi Jian	Laser	27	39	43	45	42	~~46~~	32	41	30	41	EL	340	43
Gong Lei	Finn	~~OCS~~	17	20	22	OCS	16	23	23	21	24	EL	190	24
Deng Daokun; Wang Weidong	470	20	15	6	26	~~27~~	17	22	26	12	16	EL	160	20

Women

Athlete	Event	Race											Net points	Final rank
Athlete	Event	1	2	3	4	5	6	7	8	9	10	M*	Net points	Final rank
Li Ling	RS:X	16	15	8	14	~~18~~	7	10	13	14	23	EL	115	14
Xu Lijia	Laser Radial	5	8	~~11~~	3	5	4	1	4	1	2	2	35	1st place, gold medalist(s)
Huang Xufeng; Wang Xiaoli	470	18	18	9	13	8	~~19~~	2	17	1	12	EL	97	11

M = Medal race; EL = Eliminated – did not advance into the medal race

== Shooting ==
The following 23 quota places were qualified for the Chinese shooting squad at the 2012 Games:

Men

Athlete	Event	Qualification		Final	
Athlete	Event	Points	Rank	Points	Rank
Ding Feng	25 m rapid fire pistol	588	2 Q	27	3rd place, bronze medalist(s)
Du Yu	Trap	112	30	did not advance	
Hu Binyuan	Double trap	133	14	did not advance	
Lan Xing	50 m rifle 3 positions	1159	29	did not advance	
Li Jun	Double trap	134	11	did not advance	
Pang Wei	10 m air pistol	586	2 Q	683.7	4
Tan Zongliang	10 m air pistol	581	12	did not advance	
Wang Tao	10 m air rifle	598	4 Q	700.4	4
Wang Weiyi	50 m rifle prone	591	28	did not advance	
Wang Zhiwei	50 m pistol	566	2 Q	658.6	3rd place, bronze medalist(s)
Zhang Jian	25 m rapid fire pistol	584	5 Q	601	5
Zhang Tian	50 m pistol	553	25	did not advance	
Zhu Qinan	50 m rifle 3 positions	1170	6 Q	1270.2	5
Zhu Qinan	50 m rifle prone	590	34	did not advance	
Zhu Qinan	10 m air rifle	595	10	did not advance	

Women

Athlete	Event	Qualification		Final	
Athlete	Event	Points	Rank	Points	Rank
Chen Ying	25 m pistol	585	3 Q	791.4	2nd place, silver medalist(s)
Du Li	50 m rifle 3 positions	581	13	did not advance	
Guo Wenjun	10 m air pistol	388	1 Q	488.1	1st place, gold medalist(s)
Li Peijing	50 m rifle 3 positions	583	9	did not advance	
Liu Yingzi	Trap	67	12	did not advance	
Su Yuling	10 m air pistol	386	4 Q	484.6	6
Wei Ning	Skeet	68	4 Q	91	2nd place, silver medalist(s)
Yi Siling	10 m air rifle	399	1 Q	502.9	1st place, gold medalist(s)
Yu Dan	10 m air rifle	398	3 Q	501.5	3rd place, bronze medalist(s)
Yuan Jing	25 m pistol	579	20	did not advance	

== Swimming ==
Chinese swimmers achieved qualifying standards in the following Olympic events (up to a maximum of 2 swimmers in each event at the Olympic Qualifying Time (OQT), and one at the Olympic Selection Time (OST)):

Men

Athlete	Event	Heat		Semifinal		Final	
Athlete	Event	Time	Rank	Time	Rank	Time	Rank
Chen Yin	200 m butterfly	1:55.60	6 Q	1:54.43	3 Q	1:55.18	8
Cheng Chen	200 m breaststroke	2:19.83	33	did not advance			
Cheng Feiyi	100 m backstroke	53.22	2 Q	53.50	6 Q	53.77	8
Dai Jun	1500 m freestyle	15:13.90	15	—N/a		did not advance	
Hao Yun	400 m freestyle	3:46.88	6 Q	—N/a		3:46.02	4
He Jianbin	100 m backstroke	54.81	21	did not advance			
Li Xiayan	100 m breaststroke	1:01.55	28	did not advance			
Li Yunqi	200 m freestyle	1:48.72	23	did not advance			
Lü Zhiwu	100 m freestyle	DNS		did not advance			
Sun Yang	200 m freestyle	1:46.24	1 Q	1:45.61	1 Q	1:44.93	2nd place, silver medalist(s)
Sun Yang	400 m freestyle	3:45.07	1 Q	—N/a		3:40.14 OR	1st place, gold medalist(s)
Sun Yang	1500 m freestyle	14:43.25	1 Q	—N/a		14:31.02 WR	1st place, gold medalist(s)
Wang Chengxiang	400 m individual medley	4:15.57	14	—N/a		did not advance	
Wang Shun	200 m individual medley	2:00.85	=22	did not advance			
Wu Peng	200 m butterfly	1:55.88	10 Q	1:55.65	11	did not advance	
Wu Peng	200 m individual medley	2:01.43	30	did not advance			
Xu Jiayu	200 m backstroke	2:00.26	28	did not advance			
Shi Yang	50 m freestyle	22.64	26	did not advance			
Yang Zhixian	400 m individual medley	4:15.45	12	—N/a		did not advance	
Zhang Fenglin	200 m backstroke	1:56.71	3 Q	1:55.56	3 Q	1:55.59	4
Zhou Jiawei	100 m butterfly	52.03	8 Q	52.30	13	did not advance	
Chen Zuo; He Jianbin; Lü Zhiwu; Shi Tengfei; Zhang Enjian	4 × 100 m freestyle relay	3:17.00	11	—N/a		did not advance	
Hao Yun; Jiang Haiqi; Li Yunqi; Sun Yang; Dai Jun*; Lü Zhiwu*	4 × 200 m freestyle relay	7:11.35	6 Q	—N/a		7:06.30	3rd place, bronze medalist(s)
Chen Weiwu; Cheng Chen; He Jianbin; Huang Yunkun; Lü Zhiwu; Zhou Jiawei	4 × 100 m medley relay	3:34.65	11	—N/a		did not advance	

Women

Athlete	Event	Heat		Semifinal		Final	
Athlete	Event	Time	Rank	Time	Rank	Time	Rank
Bai Anqi	200 m backstroke	2:11.26	19	did not advance			
Fu Yuanhui	100 m backstroke	59.96	8 Q	59.82	8 Q	1:00.50	8
Ji Liping	200 m breaststroke	2:25.76	=7 Q	2:27.26	13	did not advance	
Jiao Liuyang	100 m butterfly	57.71	6 Q	58.04	9	did not advance	
Jiao Liuyang	200 m butterfly	2:07.15	2 Q	2:06.10	2 Q	2:04.06 OR	1st place, gold medalist(s)
Li Jiaxing	200 m individual medley	2:13.43	13 Q	2:12.69	11	did not advance	
Li Xuanxu	400 m freestyle	4:10.95	19	—N/a		did not advance	
Li Xuanxu	400 m individual medley	4:34.28	4 Q	—N/a		4:32.91	3rd place, bronze medalist(s)
Liu Xiaoyu	100 m breaststroke	1:07.99	17	did not advance			
Liu Zige	200 m butterfly	2:08.72	11 Q	2:06.99	6 Q	2:07.77	8
Lu Ying	100 m butterfly	57.17	2 Q	57.51	6 Q	56.87	2nd place, silver medalist(s)
Shao Yiwen	400 m freestyle	4:08.41	14	—N/a		did not advance	
Shao Yiwen	800 m freestyle	8:27.78	9	—N/a		did not advance	
Song Wenyan	200 m freestyle	1:59.47	21	did not advance			
Sun Ye	200 m breaststroke	2:27.94	24	did not advance			
Tang Yi	100 m freestyle	53.28	1 Q	53.60	4 Q	53.44	3rd place, bronze medalist(s)
Wang Shijia	200 m freestyle	1:58.73	14 Q	1:58.63	15	did not advance	
Xin Xin	800 m freestyle	8:40.88	24	—N/a		did not advance	
Yanqiao Fang	10 km open water	—N/a				Withdrew	
Yao Yige	200 m backstroke	2:12.14	22	did not advance			
Ye Shiwen	200 m individual medley	2:08.90	1 Q	2:08.39 OR	1 Q	2:07.57 OR	1st place, gold medalist(s)
Ye Shiwen	400 m individual medley	4:31.73	2 Q	—N/a		4:28.43 WR	1st place, gold medalist(s)
Zhao Jin	100 m breaststroke	1:07.68	13 Q	1:07.97	15	did not advance	
Zhao Jing	100 m backstroke	59.97	9 Q	59.55	5 Q	59.23	6
Zhu Qianwei	50 m freestyle	25.54	=24	did not advance			
Qiu Yuhan; Tang Yi; Wang Haibing; Wang Shijia*; Zhu Qianwei*; Pang Jiaying	4 × 100 m freestyle relay	3:37.91	4 Q	—N/a		3:36.75	4
Chen Qian*; Liu Jing; Pang Jiaying*; Tang Yi; Wang Shijia; Ye Shiwen; Zhu Qianwei*	4 × 200 m freestyle relay	7:53.66	6 Q	—N/a		7:53.11	6
Gao Chang*; Ji Liping; Jiao Liuyang*; Lu Ying; Sun Ye*; Tang Yi; Zhao Jing	4 × 100 m medley relay	3:59.38	7 Q	—N/a		3:56.41	5

== Synchronized swimming ==
China qualified a duet and a team. The team consisted of 9 athletes, 8 in action and 1 in reserve.

Athlete	Event	Technical routine		Free routine (preliminary)			Free routine (final)		
Athlete	Event	Points	Rank	Points	Total (technical + free)	Rank	Points	Total (technical + free)	Rank
Huang Xuechen; Liu Ou	Duet	96.100	2	96.710	192.810	2 Q	96.770	192.870	3rd place, bronze medalist(s)
Chang Si; Chen Xiaojun; Huang Xuechen; Jiang Tingting; Jiang Wenwen; Liu Ou; Luo Xi; Sun Wenyan; Wu Yiwen	Team	97.000	2	—N/a			97.010	194.010	2nd place, silver medalist(s)

== Table tennis ==
China qualified four athletes for the singles table tennis events at the 2012 Olympics. Wang Hao and Zhang Jike qualified for the men's event, while Li Xiaoxia and Ding Ning qualified for the women's event.

Men

Athlete	Event	Preliminary round	Round 1	Round 2	Round 3	Round 4	Quarterfinals	Semifinals	Final / BM	
Athlete	Event	Opposition Result	Opposition Result	Opposition Result	Opposition Result	Opposition Result	Opposition Result	Opposition Result	Opposition Result	Rank
Wang Hao	Singles	Bye			Schlager (AUT); W (4–1)	Gao N (SIN); W (4–1)	Kishikawa (JPN); W (4–0)	Chuang C-y (TPE); W (4–1)	Zhang J (CHN); L (1–4)	2nd place, silver medalist(s)
Zhang Jike	Singles	Bye			Vang (TUR); W (4–0)	Samsonov (BLR); W (4–3)	Jiang Ty (HKG); W (4–1)	Ovtcharov (GER); W (4–1)	Wang H (CHN); W (4–1)	1st place, gold medalist(s)
Ma Long; Wang Hao; Zhang Jike	Team	—N/a				Russia; W (3–1)	Singapore; W (3–0)	Germany; W (3–1)	South Korea; W (3–0)	1st place, gold medalist(s)

Women

Athlete	Event	Preliminary round	Round 1	Round 2	Round 3	Round 4	Quarterfinals	Semifinals	Final / BM	
Athlete	Event	Opposition Result	Opposition Result	Opposition Result	Opposition Result	Opposition Result	Opposition Result	Opposition Result	Opposition Result	Rank
Ding Ning	Singles	Bye			Dodean (ROU); W (4–0)	Jiang Hj (HKG); W (4–1)	Fukuhara (JPN); W (4–0)	Feng Tw (SIN); W (4–2)	Li Xx (CHN); L (1–4)	2nd place, silver medalist(s)
Li Xiaoxia	Singles	Bye			Hsing (USA); W (4–2)	Park M-Y (KOR); W (4–1)	Li J (NED); W (4–0)	Ishikawa (JPN); W (4–1)	Ding N (CHN); W (4–1)	1st place, gold medalist(s)
Ding Ning; Guo Yue; Li Xiaoxia	Team	—N/a				Spain; W (3–0)	Netherlands; W (3–0)	South Korea; W (3–0)	Japan; W (3–0)	1st place, gold medalist(s)

== Taekwondo ==
China ensured berths in the following taekwondo events by reaching the top 3 of the 2011 WTF World Qualification Tournament:

Athlete	Event	Round of 16	Quarterfinals	Semifinals	Repechage	Bronze Medal	Final	
Athlete	Event	Opposition Result	Opposition Result	Opposition Result	Opposition Result	Opposition Result	Opposition Result	Rank
Liu Xiaobo	Men's +80 kg	Edwards (JAM); W 6–4	Molfetta (ITA); L 5–6 SDP	Did not advance	Gulov (TJK); W 6–1	Tanrıkulu (TUR); W 3–2	Did not advance	3rd place, bronze medalist(s)
Wu Jingyu	Women's −49 kg	Zamora (GUA); W 10–2	Kasahara (JPN); W 14–0 PTG	Zaninović (CRO); W 19–7	Bye		Yagüe (ESP); W 8–1	1st place, gold medalist(s)
Hou Yuzhuo	Women's −57 kg	López (USA); W 1–0 SDP	Mikkonen (FIN); W 7–2	Harnois (FRA); W 8–3	Bye		Jones (GBR); L 4–6	2nd place, silver medalist(s)

== Tennis ==
Athlete	Event	Round of 64	Round of 32	Round of 16	Quarterfinals	Semifinals	Final / BM	
Athlete	Event	Opposition Score	Opposition Score	Opposition Score	Opposition Score	Opposition Score	Opposition Score	Rank
Li Na	Women's singles	Hantuchová (SVK); L 2–6, 6–3, 3–6	did not advance					
Peng Shuai	Women's singles	Hsieh (TPE); W 6–3, 6–7^{(3–7)}, 7–5	Kvitová (CZE); L 5–7, 6–2, 1–6	did not advance				
Zheng Jie	Women's singles	Petrova (RUS); L 4–6, 6–7^{(7–9)}	did not advance					
Peng Shuai; Zheng Jie	Women's doubles	—N/a	Cornet / Mladenovic (FRA); W 6–1, 6–7^{(3–7)}, 6–3	Llagostera Vives / Martínez Sánchez (ESP); W 6–4, 6–2	Kirilenko / Petrova (RUS); L 5–7, 7–6^{(7–4)}, 4–6	did not advance		
Li Na; Zhang Shuai	Women's doubles	—N/a	Dulko / Suárez (ARG); W 6–4, 6–2	Hlaváčková / Hradecká (CZE); L 3–6, 1–6	did not advance			

== Triathlon ==
China qualified the following triathletes for the 2012 Olympics:

Athlete	Event	Swim (1.5 km)	Trans 1	Bike (40 km)	Trans 2	Run (10 km)	Total Time	Rank
Bai Faquan	Men's	17:55	0:46	59:46	0:33	33:26	1:52:26	46
Zhang Yi	Women's	19:49	0:50	1:10:39	0:32	38:11	2:10:01	50

== Volleyball ==
=== Beach ===
Athlete	Event	Preliminary round	Standing	Round of 16	Quarterfinals	Semifinals	Final / BM	
Athlete	Event	Opposition Score	Standing	Opposition Score	Opposition Score	Opposition Score	Opposition Score	Rank
Wu Penggen; Xu Linyin	Men's	Pool C Chevallier – Heyer (SUI); L 1 – 2 (21–18, 16–21, 12–15); Brink – Reckermann (GER); L 1 – 2 (21–13, 19–21, 8–15); Prokopiev – Semenov (RUS); L 1 – 2 (27–29, 21–17, 12–15)	4	did not advance				19
Xue Chen; Zhang Xi	Women's	Pool B Vasina – Vozakova (RUS); L 1 – 2 (21–18, 14–21, 14–16); Kuhn – Zumkehr (SUI); W 2 – 1 (21–18, 16–21, 15–8); Arvaniti – Tsiartsiani (GRE); W 2 – 0 (21–17, 21–16)	2 Q	Khomyakova – Ukolova (RUS); W 2 – 0 (21–12, 21–11)	D Schwaiger – S Schwaiger (AUT); W 2 – 0 (21–18, 21–11)	May-Treanor – Walsh Jennings (USA); L 0 – 2 (20–22, 20–22)	Juliana – Larissa (BRA); L 1 – 2 (21–11, 19–21, 12–15)	4

=== Indoor ===
China qualified a 12-person women's team for the indoor volleyball tournament.

==== Women's tournament ====
Team roster

The following is the Chinese roster in the women's volleyball tournament of the 2012 Summer Olympics.

Head coach: Yu Juemin

№	Name	Date of birth	Height	Weight	Spike	Block	2012 club
1	Wang Yimei	11 January 1988	1.90 m (6 ft 3 in)	90 kg (200 lb)	318 cm (125 in)	305 cm (120 in)	(China) Liaoning
2	Mi Yang	24 January 1989	1.80 m (5 ft 11 in)	70 kg (150 lb)	305 cm (120 in)	298 cm (117 in)	(China) Tianjin
4	Hui Ruoqi	4 March 1991	1.89 m (6 ft 2 in)	70 kg (150 lb)	312 cm (123 in)	305 cm (120 in)	(China) Jiangsu
6	Chu Jinling	29 July 1984	1.90 m (6 ft 3 in)	72 kg (159 lb)	310 cm (120 in)	302 cm (119 in)	(China) Liaoning
7	Zhang Xian (L)	16 March 1985	1.67 m (5 ft 6 in)	57 kg (126 lb)	290 cm (110 in)	280 cm (110 in)	(China) Liaoning
8	Wei Qiuyue (c)	26 September 1988	1.82 m (6 ft 0 in)	65 kg (143 lb)	305 cm (120 in)	300 cm (120 in)	(China) Tianjin
9	Yang Junjing	15 May 1989	1.90 m (6 ft 3 in)	70 kg (150 lb)	308 cm (121 in)	300 cm (120 in)	(China) Bayi
10	Shan Danna	8 October 1991	1.68 m (5 ft 6 in)	60 kg (130 lb)	295 cm (116 in)	285 cm (112 in)	(China) Zhejiang
11	Xu Yunli	2 August 1987	1.96 m (6 ft 5 in)	75 kg (165 lb)	317 cm (125 in)	315 cm (124 in)	(China) Fujian
12	Zeng Chunlei	3 November 1989	1.86 m (6 ft 1 in)	77 kg (170 lb)	318 cm (125 in)	315 cm (124 in)	(China) Beijing
15	Ma Yunwen	19 October 1986	1.89 m (6 ft 2 in)	76 kg (168 lb)	315 cm (124 in)	307 cm (121 in)	(China) Shanghai
17	Zhang Lei	11 January 1985	1.81 m (5 ft 11 in)	71 kg (157 lb)	315 cm (124 in)	310 cm (120 in)	(China) Shanghai

Group play

Pos	Team	Pld	W	L	Pts	SW	SL	SR	SPW	SPL	SPR	Qualification
1	United States	5	5	0	15	15	2	7.500	426	345	1.235	Quarter-finals
2	China	5	3	2	9	11	10	1.100	475	461	1.030	Quarter-finals
3	South Korea	5	2	3	8	11	10	1.100	449	452	0.993	Quarter-finals
4	Brazil	5	3	2	7	10	10	1.000	447	420	1.064	Quarter-finals
5	Turkey	5	2	3	6	9	11	0.818	434	443	0.980	
6	Serbia	5	0	5	0	2	15	0.133	297	407	0.730	

28 July 2012; 11:30	China	3–1	Serbia	Earls Court Exhibition Centre, London; Attendance: 13,000; Referees: Susana Rodríguez (ESP), Ibrahim Al-Naama (QAT)
28 July 2012; 11:30	(16–25, 25–18, 25–13, 25–12) result statistics			Earls Court Exhibition Centre, London; Attendance: 13,000; Referees: Susana Rodríguez (ESP), Ibrahim Al-Naama (QAT)

30 July 2012; 09:30	China	3–1	Turkey	Earls Court Exhibition Centre, London; Attendance: 10,500; Referees: Frans Loderus (NED), Mohamed Shaaban (EGY)
30 July 2012; 09:30	(25–20, 25–20, 29–31, 25–22) result statistics			Earls Court Exhibition Centre, London; Attendance: 10,500; Referees: Frans Loderus (NED), Mohamed Shaaban (EGY)

1 August 2012; 20:00	United States	3–0	China	Earls Court Exhibition Centre, London; Attendance: 14,800; Referees: Rolando Cholakian (ARG), Jose Mercado (PUR)
1 August 2012; 20:00	(26–24, 25–16, 31–29) result statistics			Earls Court Exhibition Centre, London; Attendance: 14,800; Referees: Rolando Cholakian (ARG), Jose Mercado (PUR)

3 August 2012; 09:30	Brazil	3–2	China	Earls Court Exhibition Centre, London; Attendance: 11,000; Referees: Denny Lassi (DOM), Bela Hobor (HUN)
3 August 2012; 09:30	(25–16, 20–25, 25–18, 28–30, 15–10) result statistics			Earls Court Exhibition Centre, London; Attendance: 11,000; Referees: Denny Lassi (DOM), Bela Hobor (HUN)

5 August 2012; 11:30	China	3–2	South Korea	Earls Court Exhibition Centre, London; Attendance: 12,000; Referees: Janpen Jirakul (THA), Frans Loderus (NED)
5 August 2012; 11:30	(28–26, 22–25, 25–19, 22–25, 15–10) result statistics			Earls Court Exhibition Centre, London; Attendance: 12,000; Referees: Janpen Jirakul (THA), Frans Loderus (NED)

Quarter-final

7 August 2012; 13:00	Japan	3–2	China	Earls Court Exhibition Centre, London; Attendance: 12,000; Referees: Susana Rodriguez (ESP), Zorica Bjelić (SRB)
7 August 2012; 13:00	(28–26, 23–25, 25–23, 23–25, 18–16) result statistics			Earls Court Exhibition Centre, London; Attendance: 12,000; Referees: Susana Rodriguez (ESP), Zorica Bjelić (SRB)

== Water polo ==
China qualified a 13-member women's water polo team.

=== Women's tournament ===
Team roster

The following is the Chinese roster in the women's water polo tournament of the 2012 Summer Olympics.

№	Name	Pos.	Height	Weight	Date of birth	2012 club
1	Yang Jun	GK	1.80 m (5 ft 11 in)	69 kg (152 lb)	28 April 1988	
2	Teng Fei	D	1.69 m (5 ft 7 in)	65 kg (143 lb)	23 January 1988	
3	Liu Ping	CB	1.73 m (5 ft 8 in)	67 kg (148 lb)	1 May 1987	
4	Sun Yujun	D	1.68 m (5 ft 6 in)	65 kg (143 lb)	30 January 1987	
5	He Jin	CF	1.78 m (5 ft 10 in)	100 kg (220 lb)	3 May 1987	
6	Sun Yating	CF	1.80 m (5 ft 11 in)	80 kg (176 lb)	24 February 1988	
7	Song Donglun	D	1.78 m (5 ft 10 in)	82 kg (181 lb)	28 April 1991	
8	Gao Ao	D	1.73 m (5 ft 8 in)	75 kg (165 lb)	26 July 1990	
9	Wang Yi	D	1.78 m (5 ft 10 in)	69 kg (152 lb)	29 July 1987	
10	Ma Huanhuan	D	1.77 m (5 ft 10 in)	69 kg (152 lb)	13 January 1990	
11	Sun Huizi	D	1.82 m (6 ft 0 in)	69 kg (152 lb)	11 June 1990	
12	Zhang Lei	D	1.71 m (5 ft 7 in)	65 kg (143 lb)	9 May 1988	
13	Wang Ying	GK	1.85 m (6 ft 1 in)	76 kg (168 lb)	7 August 1988	

Head coach: Juan Jané

Group play

Team	Pld	W	D	L	GF	GA	GD	Pts
Spain	3	2	1	0	33	26	+7	5
United States	3	2	1	0	30	28	+2	5
Hungary	3	1	0	2	35	37	−2	2
China	3	0	0	3	22	29	−7	0

30 July 2012; 14:10	Report	Spain	11–6	China	Water Polo Arena, London; Referees: Alan Balfanbayev (KAZ), Cory Williams (NZL)
30 July 2012; 14:10	Report	Score by quarters: 2–2, 4–2, 4–2, 1–0			Water Polo Arena, London; Referees: Alan Balfanbayev (KAZ), Cory Williams (NZL)
30 July 2012; 14:10	Report	Espar 3	Goals	Ma Huanhuan 3	Water Polo Arena, London; Referees: Alan Balfanbayev (KAZ), Cory Williams (NZL)

1 August 2012; 14:10	Report	Hungary	11–10	China	Water Polo Arena, London; Referees: Georgios Stavridis (GRE), Svetlana Dreval (RUS)
1 August 2012; 14:10	Report	Score by quarters: 1–3, 4–4, 4–3, 2–0			Water Polo Arena, London; Referees: Georgios Stavridis (GRE), Svetlana Dreval (RUS)
1 August 2012; 14:10	Report	Szűcs 4	Goals	four players 2	Water Polo Arena, London; Referees: Georgios Stavridis (GRE), Svetlana Dreval (RUS)

3 August 2012; 19:40	Report	China	6–7	United States	Water Polo Arena, London; Referees: Daniel Flahive (AUS), Marijo Brguljan (MNE)
3 August 2012; 19:40	Report	Score by quarters: 1–0, 2–2, 0–3, 3–2			Water Polo Arena, London; Referees: Daniel Flahive (AUS), Marijo Brguljan (MNE)
3 August 2012; 19:40	Report	Sun Yating, Ma Huanhuan 2	Goals	Steffens 3	Water Polo Arena, London; Referees: Daniel Flahive (AUS), Marijo Brguljan (MNE)

Quarterfinals

5 August 2012; 16:10	Report	China	18–20 (OT, PSO)	Australia	Water Polo Arena, London; Referees: Georgios Stavridis (GRE), Dragan Stampalija (CRO)
5 August 2012; 16:10	Report	Score by quarters: 5–5, 3–3, 4–2, 2–4 OT: 1–2, 1–0 PSO: 2–4			Water Polo Arena, London; Referees: Georgios Stavridis (GRE), Dragan Stampalija (CRO)
5 August 2012; 16:10	Report	Ma Huanhuan 4	Goals	Ralph, Zagame 3	Water Polo Arena, London; Referees: Georgios Stavridis (GRE), Dragan Stampalija (CRO)

5th-8th Place

7 August 2012; 14:10	Report	Italy	10–14	China	Water Polo Arena, London; Referees: Svetlana Dreval (RUS), Anton Bervoets (NED)
7 August 2012; 14:10	Report	Score by quarters: 2–5, 2–5, 2–2, 4–2			Water Polo Arena, London; Referees: Svetlana Dreval (RUS), Anton Bervoets (NED)
7 August 2012; 14:10	Report	Di Mario 4	Goals	six players 2	Water Polo Arena, London; Referees: Svetlana Dreval (RUS), Anton Bervoets (NED)

5th-6th Place

9 August 2012; 15:50	Report	China	16–15 (OT)	Russia	Water Polo Arena, London; Referees: Brian Littlejohn (GBR), Steven Rotsart (USA)
9 August 2012; 15:50	Report	Score by quarters: 3–3, 5–6, 3–2, 3–3 OT: 1–0, 1–1			Water Polo Arena, London; Referees: Brian Littlejohn (GBR), Steven Rotsart (USA)
9 August 2012; 15:50	Report	Ma Huanhuan 6	Goals	Fedotova, Antonova 4	Water Polo Arena, London; Referees: Brian Littlejohn (GBR), Steven Rotsart (USA)

== Weightlifting ==
China qualified 6 men and 4 women for the Olympic weightlifting competition.

Men

Athlete	Event	Snatch		Clean & Jerk		Total	Rank
Athlete	Event	Result	Rank	Result	Rank	Total	Rank
Wu Jingbiao	−56 kg	133	1	156	2	289	2nd place, silver medalist(s)
Zhang Jie	−62 kg	140	3	174	2	314	4
Lin Qingfeng	−69 kg	157	1	187	2	344	1st place, gold medalist(s)
Lu Haojie	−77 kg	170	2	190	5	360	2nd place, silver medalist(s)
Lü Xiaojun	−77 kg	175 WR	1	204	1	379 WR	1st place, gold medalist(s)
Lu Yong	−85 kg	178	1	~~205~~	DNF	178	DNF

Women

Athlete	Event	Snatch		Clean & Jerk		Total	Rank
Athlete	Event	Result	Rank	Result	Rank	Total	Rank
Wang Mingjuan	−48 kg	91	1	114	1	205	1st place, gold medalist(s)
Zhou Jun	−53 kg	~~95~~	DNF	—	—	—	DNF
Li Xueying	−58 kg	108 OR	1	138	1	246 OR	1st place, gold medalist(s)
Zhou Lulu	+75 kg	146	2	187	1	333 WR	1st place, gold medalist(s)

== Wrestling ==
China qualified 8 quota places for wrestling at the 2012 games.

Key:

- VT – Victory by Fall.
- PP – Decision by Points: the loser with technical points.
- PO – Decision by Points: the loser without technical points.

Men's freestyle

Athlete	Event	Qualification	Round of 16	Quarterfinal	Semifinal	Repechage 1	Repechage 2	Final / BM	
Athlete	Event	Opposition Result	Opposition Result	Opposition Result	Opposition Result	Opposition Result	Opposition Result	Opposition Result	Rank
Zhang Chongyao	−74 kg	Bye	Hatos (HUN); L 0–3 ^{PO}	did not advance					17
Liang Lei	−120 kg	Withdrew due to injury							

Men's Greco-Roman

Athlete	Event	Qualification	Round of 16	Quarterfinal	Semifinal	Repechage 1	Repechage 2	Final / BM	
Athlete	Event	Opposition Result	Opposition Result	Opposition Result	Opposition Result	Opposition Result	Opposition Result	Opposition Result	Rank
Li Shujin	−55 kg	Ragymov (UKR); W 3–1 ^{PP}	Kostadinov (BUL); W 3–1 ^{PP}	Bayramov (AZE); L 0–3 ^{PO}	Did not advance	Bye	Semenov (RUS); L 0–3 ^{PO}	Did not advance	7
Sheng Jiang	−60 kg	Norouzi (IRI); L 1–3 ^{PP}	did not advance			Angelov (BUL); L 1–3 ^{PP}	did not advance		10
Liu Deli	−120 kg	Deák-Bárdos (HUN); L 1–3 ^{PP}	did not advance						13

Women's freestyle

Athlete	Event	Qualification	Round of 16	Quarterfinal	Semifinal	Repechage 1	Repechage 2	Final / BM	
Athlete	Event	Opposition Result	Opposition Result	Opposition Result	Opposition Result	Opposition Result	Opposition Result	Opposition Result	Rank
Zhao Shasha	−48 kg	Chun (USA); L 0–3 ^{PO}	did not advance						18
Jing Ruixue	−63 kg	Bye	Choe U-G (PRK); W 3–0 ^{PO}	Michalik (POL); W 3–0 ^{PO}	Volosova (RUS); W 3–1 ^{PP}	Bye		Icho (JPN); L 0–3 ^{PO}	2nd place, silver medalist(s)
Wang Jiao	−72 kg	Bye	Obiajunwa (NGR); W 5–0 ^{VT}	Saenko (MDA); W 5–0 ^{VT}	Vorobieva (RUS); L 0–5 ^{VT}	Bye		Manyurova (KAZ); L 1–3 ^{PP}	5

== See also ==
- China at the 2012 Summer Paralympics
- Olympic competitors for China
- Sports in China
