= 2012 Asian Shooting Championships =

International sport shooting competition

- Host city: Doha, Qatar
- Dates: 11–22 January 2012
- Main venue: Lusail Shooting Range

The 2012 Asian Shooting Championships were held in Doha, Qatar between January 11 and January 22, 2012. It acts as the Asian qualifying tournament for the 2012 Summer Olympics in London.

== Medal summary ==
=== Men ===
| Event | Gold | Silver | Bronze |
|---|---|---|---|
| 10 m air pistol | Jin Jong-oh; South Korea | Wang Zhiwei; China | Tomoyuki Matsuda; Japan |
| 10 m air pistol team | South Korea; Jin Jong-oh; Lee Dae-myung; Mok Jin-mun | Japan; Kojiro Horimizu; Susumu Kobayashi; Tomoyuki Matsuda | Vietnam; Hoàng Xuân Vinh; Nguyễn Mạnh Tường; Trần Quốc Cường |
| 25 m center fire pistol | Jin Yongde; China | Xie Zhenxiang; China | Hoàng Xuân Vinh; Vietnam |
| 25 m center fire pistol team | China; Jin Yongde; Li Chuanlin; Xie Zhenxiang | Vietnam; Hà Minh Thành; Hoàng Xuân Vinh; Nguyễn Mạnh Tường | Thailand; Prakarn Karndee; Jakkrit Panichpatikum; Pruet Sriyaphan |
| 25 m rapid fire pistol | Jang Dae-kyu; South Korea | Li Yuehong; China | Teruyoshi Akiyama; Japan |
| 25 m rapid fire pistol team | China; Ding Feng; Li Yuehong; Zhou Zhiguo | India; Vijay Kumar; Gurpreet Singh; Pemba Tamang | South Korea; Choi Yong-hoo; Jang Dae-kyu; Kim Dae-yoong |
| 25 m standard pistol | Vijay Kumar; India | Jin Yongde; China | Tomohiro Kida; Japan |
| 25 m standard pistol team | China; Jin Yongde; Li Chuanlin; Xie Zhenxiang | Thailand; Prakarn Karndee; Jakkrit Panichpatikum; Pruet Sriyaphan | Japan; Tomohiro Kida; Masaru Nakashige; Norihito Sannomiya |
| 50 m pistol | Jin Jong-oh; South Korea | Zhang Tian; China | Wu Xiao; China |
| 50 m pistol team | China; Pang Wei; Wu Xiao; Zhang Tian | South Korea; Jin Jong-oh; Lee Dae-myung; Mok Jin-mun | Japan; Kojiro Horimizu; Susumu Kobayashi; Tomoyuki Matsuda |
| 10 m air rifle | Abhinav Bindra; India | Zhu Qinan; China | Wang Tao; China |
| 10 m air rifle team | China; Liu Tianyou; Wang Tao; Zhu Qinan | India; Abhinav Bindra; Gagan Narang; Satyendra Singh | Mongolia; Nyantain Bayaraa; Boldbaataryn Bishrel; Olzodyn Enkhsaikhan |
| 50 m rifle prone | Midori Yajima; Japan | Han Jin-seop; South Korea | Wang Weiyi; China |
| 50 m rifle prone team | South Korea; Han Jin-seop; Kim Jong-hyun; Lee Hyun-tae | China; Hou Kai; Tian Hui; Wang Weiyi | Japan; Koji Tomizawa; Midori Yajima; Toshikazu Yamashita |
| 50 m rifle 3 positions | Sanjeev Rajput; India | Kim Jong-hyun; South Korea | Gagan Narang; India |
| 50 m rifle 3 positions team | India; Imran Hassan Khan; Gagan Narang; Sanjeev Rajput | South Korea; Han Jin-seop; Kim Jong-hyun; Lee Hyun-tae | Mongolia; Boldbaataryn Bishrel; Olzodyn Enkhsaikhan; Tsedevdorjiin Mönkh-Erdene |
| 10 m running target | Xu Hong; China | Zhang Jie; China | Yang Haibo; China |
| 10 m running target team | China; Yang Haibo; Xu Hong; Zhang Jie | Kazakhstan; Andrey Gurov; Bakhtiyar Ibrayev; Rassim Mologly | Vietnam; Ngô Hữu Vượng; Nguyễn Mạnh Cường; Trần Hoàng Vũ |
| 10 m running target mixed | Xu Hong; China | Bakhtiyar Ibrayev; Kazakhstan | Andrey Gurov; Kazakhstan |
| 10 m running target mixed team | China; Yang Haibo; Xu Hong; Zhang Jie | Kazakhstan; Andrey Gurov; Bakhtiyar Ibrayev; Rassim Mologly | Vietnam; Ngô Hữu Vượng; Nguyễn Mạnh Cường; Trần Hoàng Vũ |
| Trap | Manavjit Singh Sandhu; India | Talal Al-Rashidi; Kuwait | Rashid Hamad Al-Athba; Qatar |
| Trap team | Kuwait; Naser Al-Meqlad; Khaled Al-Mudhaf; Talal Al-Rashidi | India; Kynan Chenai; Manavjit Singh Sandhu; Mansher Singh | Lebanon; Nidal Asmar; Talih Bou Kamel; Joseph Hanna |
| Double trap | Juma Al-Maktoum; United Arab Emirates | Fehaid Al-Deehani; Kuwait | Saif Al-Shamsi; United Arab Emirates |
| Double trap team | United Arab Emirates; Juma Al-Maktoum; Saif Al-Shamsi; Mohammed Dhahi | Kuwait; Hamad Al-Afasi; Fehaid Al-Deehani; Mashfi Al-Mutairi | India; Mohammed Asab; Rajyavardhan Singh Rathore; Ronjan Sodhi |
| Skeet | Nasser Al-Attiyah; Qatar | Abdullah Al-Rashidi; Kuwait | Saeed Al-Maktoum; United Arab Emirates |
| Skeet team | Qatar; Masoud Saleh Al-Athba; Rashid Saleh Al-Athba; Nasser Al-Attiyah | Kuwait; Naser Al-Deehani; Zaid Al-Mutairi; Abdullah Al-Rashidi | United Arab Emirates; Mohamed Hussain Ahmed; Saeed Al-Maktoum; Saif Bin Futtais |

=== Women ===
| Event | Gold | Silver | Bronze |
|---|---|---|---|
| 10 m air pistol | Kim Jang-mi; South Korea | Chen Ying; China | Annu Raj Singh; India |
| 10 m air pistol team | India; Shweta Chaudhary; Heena Sidhu; Annu Raj Singh | China; Chen Ying; Sun Qi; Tao Luna | South Korea; Kim Jang-mi; Kwak Jung-hye; Lee Yun-hee |
| 25 m pistol | Chen Ying; China | Zhang Jingjing; China | Yuan Jing; China |
| 25 m pistol team | China; Chen Ying; Yuan Jing; Zhang Jingjing | South Korea; Kim Jang-mi; Kim Kyeong-ae; Kim Yun-mi | Kazakhstan; Zauresh Baibussinova; Galina Belyayeva; Yuliya Drishlyuk |
| 10 m air rifle | Yi Siling; China | Maryam Arzouqi; Kuwait | Du Li; China |
| 10 m air rifle team | China; Du Li; Yi Siling; Zhang Yue | India; Anjali Bhagwat; Mampi Das; Ayonika Paul | Iran; Elaheh Ahmadi; Narjes Emamgholinejad; Safieh Sahragard |
| 50 m rifle prone | Raj Kumari; India | Li Peijing; China | Jeong Mi-ra; South Korea |
| 50 m rifle prone team | South Korea; Jeong Gyung-suk; Jeong Mi-ra; Kong Hyun-ah | China; Du Li; Li Peijing; Wan Xiangyan | India; Lajja Goswami; Raj Kumari; Tejaswini Sawant |
| 50 m rifle 3 positions | Du Li; China | Li Peijing; China | Jeong Mi-ra; South Korea |
| 50 m rifle 3 positions team | China; Du Li; Li Peijing; Wan Xiangyan | South Korea; Jeong Gyung-suk; Jeong Mi-ra; Kong Hyun-ah | Malaysia; Nur Ayuni Farhana; Nur Suryani Taibi; Muslifah Zulkifli |
| 10 m running target | Su Li; China | Li Xueyan; China | Yang Zeng; China |
| 10 m running target mixed | Yang Zeng; China | Su Li; China | Li Xueyan; China |
| Trap | Kang Gee-eun; South Korea | Yang Huan; China | Yukie Nakayama; Japan |
| Trap team | Japan; Megumi Inoue; Riyo Kiyoshi; Yukie Nakayama | China; Chang Yunfan; Liu Yingzi; Yang Huan | Iran; Fatemeh Amiri; Narges Ranjbar; Sepideh Sirani |
| Skeet | Zhang Shan; China | Wei Ning; China | Angelina Michshuk; Kazakhstan |
| Skeet team | China; Wei Ning; Zhang Donglian; Zhang Shan | Kazakhstan; Zhaniya Aidarkhanova; Elvira Akchurina; Angelina Michshuk | Kuwait; Shaikhah Al-Rashidi; Eman Al-Shamaa; Afrah Bin Hussain |

== Medal table ==
| Rank | Nation | Gold | Silver | Bronze | Total |
|---|---|---|---|---|---|
| 1 | China | 20 | 19 | 8 | 47 |
| 2 | South Korea | 8 | 6 | 4 | 18 |
| 3 | India | 7 | 4 | 4 | 15 |
| 4 | Japan | 2 | 1 | 7 | 10 |
| 5 | United Arab Emirates | 2 | 0 | 3 | 5 |
| 6 | Qatar | 2 | 0 | 1 | 3 |
| 7 | Kuwait | 1 | 6 | 1 | 8 |
| 8 | Kazakhstan | 0 | 4 | 3 | 7 |
| 9 | Vietnam | 0 | 1 | 4 | 5 |
| 10 | Thailand | 0 | 1 | 1 | 2 |
| 11 | Iran | 0 | 0 | 2 | 2 |
| 11 | Mongolia | 0 | 0 | 2 | 2 |
| 13 | Lebanon | 0 | 0 | 1 | 1 |
| 13 | Malaysia | 0 | 0 | 1 | 1 |
| Totals (14 entries) | | 42 | 42 | 42 | 126 |
