= Zhang Tian =

Chinese sport shooter (born 1980)

Personal information
- Nationality: China
- Born: 30 September 1980 (age 45) Inner Mongolia, China
- Height: 1.79 m (5 ft 10 1/2 in)
- Weight: 88 kg (194 lb)

Sport
- Sport: Shooting
- Events: 10 m air pistol (AP60); 50 m pistol (FP)
- Club: Ningxia Sports Club
- Coached by: Wang Yi Fu
Medal record
Men's shooting
Representing China
Asian Championships
Gold medal – first place	2012 Doha	50 m pistol team
Silver medal – second place	2012 Doha	50 m pistol
Silver medal – second place	2019 Doha	50 m pistol team

Zhang Tian (simplified Chinese: 张添; traditional Chinese: 張添; pinyin: Zhāng Tiān; born September 30, 1980, in Inner Mongolia) is a Chinese sport shooter. He won a silver medal in the men's free pistol at the 2012 ISSF World Cup series in Milan, Italy, with a total score of 664.6 points, earning him a spot on the Chinese team for the Olympics.

Zhang represented China at the 2012 Summer Olympics in London, where he competed in the men's 50 m pistol, along with his teammate Wang Zhiwei who eventually won the bronze medal in the final. Zhang scored a total of 553 points in the qualifying rounds, two inner tens behind Italy's Francesco Bruno, finishing in twenty-fifth place.
