= Choi Young-rae =

South Korean sport shooter

Personal information
- Nationality: South Korean
- Born: May 13, 1983 (age 43) Danyang, South Korea
- Height: 1.66 m (5 ft 5 1/2 in)
- Weight: 74 kg (163 lb)

Sport

Korean name
- Hangul: 최영래
- Hanja: 崔英來
- RR: Choe Yeongrae
- MR: Ch'oe Yŏngnae
Medal record
Men's shooting
Representing South Korea
Olympic Games
Silver medal – second place	2012 London	50m pistol

Choi Young-rae (Korean: 최영래; Korean pronunciation: [tɕʰwe̞.jʌŋ.nɛ̝]; born May 13, 1983, in Danyang, North Chungcheong Province) is a South Korean sport shooter who competes in the men's 10 metre air pistol and the 50 metre pistol. At the 2012 Summer Olympics, he finished 35th in the qualifying round for the 10 metre air pistol, failing to make the cut for the final. However, in the men's 50 metre pistol, he won a silver medal, completing a Korean one-two.
