= Angelina Michshuk =

Kazakhstani sport shooter (born 1988)

Personal information
- Nationality: Kazakhstan
- Born: 1 May 1988 (age 38) Chimkent, Kazakh SSR, Soviet Union
- Height: 1.55 m (5 ft 1 in)
- Weight: 54 kg (119 lb)

Sport
- Sport: Shooting
- Event: Skeet
Medal record
Women's shooting
Representing Kazakhstan
Asian Championships
Silver medal – second place	2012 Doha	Skeet team
Bronze medal – third place	2012 Doha	Skeet
Asian Shotgun Championships
Gold medal – first place	2014 Al-Ain	Skeet
Gold medal – first place	2014 Al-Ain	Skeet team
Silver medal – second place	2011 Kuala Lumpur	Skeet team
Silver medal – second place	2013 Almaty	Skeet team
Bronze medal – third place	2018 Kuwait City	Skeet team
Bronze medal – third place	2019 Almaty	Skeet team

Angelina Michshuk (Kazakh: Ангелина Мищук; born 1 May 1988) is a Kazakhstani sport shooter. She won a bronze medal in the women's skeet at the 2012 Asian Shooting Championships in Doha, Qatar, with a total score of 91 targets, which earned her a place on the Kazakhstan team for the 2012 Summer Olympics.

In the women's skeet event at the 2012 Summer Olympics in London, Michshuk placed ninth in the qualifying rounds, with a total score of 66 targets – one point ahead of the French shooter and two‑time Olympian Véronique Girardet.
