= Shooting at the 2012 Summer Olympics – Men's 50 metre pistol =

Men's 50 metre pistol at the Games of the XXX Olympiad
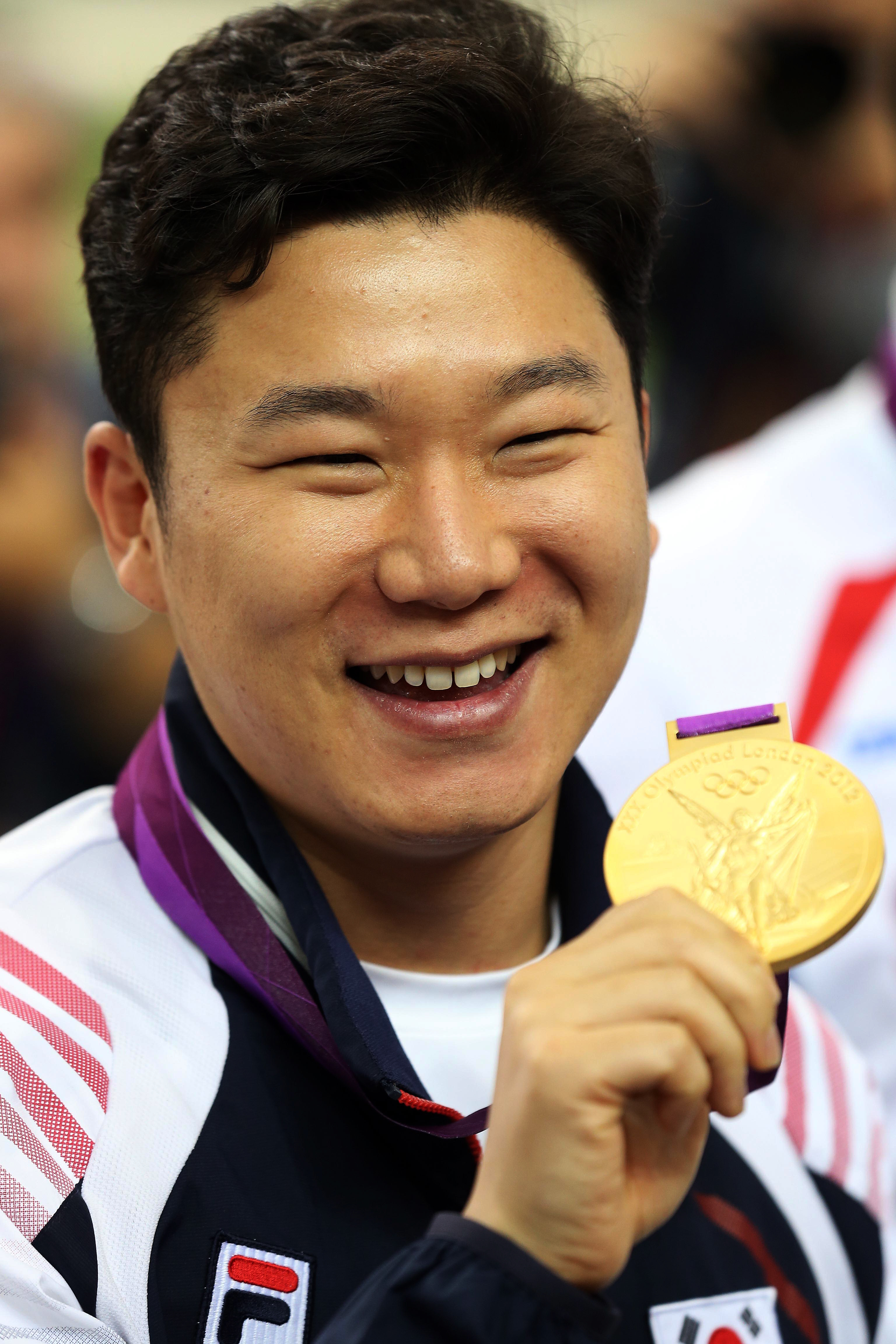
- Jin Jong-oh
- Venue: Royal Artillery Barracks
- Date: 5 August 2012
- Competitors: 38 from 27 nations
- Winning score: 662.0

Medalists
1st place, gold medalist(s)		Jin Jong-oh; South Korea
2nd place, silver medalist(s)		Choi Young-rae; South Korea
3rd place, bronze medalist(s)		Wang Zhiwei; China

The men's ISSF 50 meter pistol event at the 2012 Olympic Games took place on 5 August 2012 at the Royal Artillery Barracks. There were 38 competitors from 27 nations. The event was won by Jin Jong-oh of South Korea, the second of his three consecutive victories in the free pistol. He was the first (and, since the event has been discontinued, the only) shooter to win two individual free pistol gold medals. It was his third medal in the event (including a silver in 2004), making him the fourth man to earn three free pistol medals. His countryman Choi Young-rae took silver, the first time since 1976 that a nation had finished 1–2 in the event. Chinese shooter Wang Zhiwei received bronze.

== Background ==
This was the 23rd appearance of the ISSF 50 meter pistol event. The event was held at every Summer Olympics from 1896 to 1920 (except 1904, when no shooting events were held) and from 1936 to 2016; it was nominally open to women from 1968 to 1980, although very few women participated these years. A separate women's event would be introduced in 1984. 1896 and 1908 were the only Games in which the distance was not 50 metres; the former used 30 metres and the latter 50 yards.

Five of the eight finalists from the 2008 Games returned: gold medalist (and 2004 silver medalist) Jin Jong-oh of South Korea, bronze medalist Vladimir Isakov of Russia, fourth-place finisher Oleg Omelchuk of Ukraine, fifth-place finisher Pavol Kopp of Slovakia, and seventh-place finisher Damir Mikec of Serbia. The 2010 world championship podium was Tomoyuki Matsuda of Japan, Lee Dae-myung of South Korea, and Vyacheslav Podlesnyy of Kazakhstan; Matsuda and Podlesnyy competed in London but the South Korean pair was Jin and Choi Young-rae. Mikec was the No. 1 seed.

Iceland made its debut in the event. The United States made its 21st appearance, most of any nation, having missed only the 1900 event and the boycotted 1980 Games.

Jin used a Morini CM84E.

== Qualification ==
Each National Olympic Committee (NOC) could enter up to two shooters if the NOC earned enough quota sports or had enough crossover-qualified shooters. To compete, a shooter needed a quota spot and to achieve a Minimum Qualification Score (MQS). Once a shooter was using a quota spot in any shooting event, they could enter any other shooting event for which they had achieved the MQS as well (a crossover qualification). There were 18 quota spots available for the free pistol: 4 at the 2010 World Championship, 8 at the 2011 World Cup events (2 spots at each of 4 events), 5 for continental champions (2 each for Europe and Americas, 1 for Asia), and a Tripartite Commission invitation. There were also 2 re-allocated places and 18 double starters (primarily from the 10 metre air pistol event).

== Competition format ==
The competition featured two rounds, qualifying and final. The qualifying round was the same as the previous competitions: each shooter fired 60 shots, in 6 series of 10 shots each, at a distance of 50 metres. The target was round, 50 centimetres in diameter, with 10 scoring rings. Scoring for each shot was up to 10 points, in increments of 1 point. The maximum score possible was 600 points. The top 8 shooters advanced to a final; ties necessary for qualifying were broken by an additional series. They shot an additional series of 10 shots, with the score added to their qualifying round score to give a 70-shot total. The 1996 competition had added decimal scoring to the final; shots could score up to 10.9 for the final. The total maximum was therefore 709.0. Any pistol was permitted.

== Records ==
Prior to this competition, the existing world and Olympic records were as follows.

Qualifying (60 shots)
World record	Jin Jong-oh (KOR)	583	Granada, Spain	9 September 2014
Olympic record	Aleksandr Melentiev (URS)	581	Moscow, Soviet Union	20 July 1980

Final (70 shots)
World record	William Demarest (USA)	676.2 (577+99.2)	Milan, Italy	4 June 2000
Olympic record	Boris Kokorev (RUS)	666.4 (570+96.4)	Atlanta, United States	23 July 1996

No new world or Olympic records were set during the competition.

== Schedule ==
Date	Time	Round
Sunday, 5 August 2012	9:00; 12:30	Qualifying; Final

== Results ==
=== Qualifying ===
Rank	Shooter	Nation	1	2	3	4	5	6	Total	Notes
1	Choi Young-rae	South Korea	98	94	93	92	95	97	569	Q
2	Wang Zhiwei	China	95	95	95	98	93	90	566	Q
3	Andrija Zlatić	Serbia	92	97	95	91	96	93	564	Q
4	Hoàng Xuân Vinh	Vietnam	94	95	96	92	92	94	563	Q
5	Jin Jong-oh	South Korea	97	95	94	91	92	93	562	Q
6	Christian Reitz	Germany	94	94	94	95	92	91	560	Q
7	Leonid Yekimov	Russia	94	93	94	95	95	89	560	Q
8	Giuseppe Giordano	Italy	93	96	93	92	93	92	559	Q Shoot-off: 49.6
9	João Costa	Portugal	93	95	97	92	91	91	559	Shoot-off: 49.5
10	Vladimir Isakov	Russia	92	98	95	91	92	91	559	Shoot-off: 49.0
11	Tomoyuki Matsuda	Japan	94	90	96	92	93	94	559	Shoot-off: 49.0
12	İsmail Keleş	Turkey	94	92	94	94	94	91	559	Shoot-off: 46.5
13	Yusuf Dikeç	Turkey	95	94	94	92	92	92	559	Shoot-off: 46.5
14	Jakkrit Panichpatikum	Thailand	96	90	90	93	96	94	558	
15	Nickolaus Mowrer	United States	93	93	90	93	94	95	558	
16	Damir Mikec	Serbia	92	90	94	95	94	93	558	
17	Florian Schmidt	Germany	95	94	91	94	95	88	557	
18	Norayr Bakhtamyan	Armenia	95	96	87	91	94	94	557	
19	Daniel Repacholi	Australia	94	95	90	93	90	95	557	
20	Pavol Kopp	Slovakia	92	92	96	92	90	94	556	
21	Walter Lapeyre	France	91	93	90	93	92	95	554	
22	Pablo Carrera	Spain	91	94	92	91	94	92	554	
23	Juraj Tužinský	Slovakia	91	97	90	90	96	90	554	
24	Francesco Bruno	Italy	90	92	93	92	96	90	553	
25	Zhang Tian	China	92	87	93	92	95	94	553	
26	Kai Jahnsson	Finland	91	91	93	90	92	95	552	
27	Ebrahim Barkhordari	Iran	95	89	91	94	91	92	552	
28	Daryl Szarenski	United States	92	95	91	89	88	95	550	
29	Oleh Omelchuk	Ukraine	92	89	91	91	94	91	548	
30	Kanstantsin Lukashyk	Belarus	94	93	90	91	92	87	547	
31	Andrei Kazak	Belarus	93	88	93	91	92	90	547	
32	Ásgeir Sigurgeirsson	Iceland	89	92	92	92	93	86	544	
33	Franck Dumoulin	France	89	88	92	89	92	91	541	
34	Vyacheslav Podlesnyy	Kazakhstan	89	91	88	89	89	94	540	
35	Roger Daniel	Trinidad and Tobago	89	93	91	90	87	89	539	
36	Sergio Sánchez	Guatemala	91	90	88	89	89	86	533	
37	Arben Kucana	Albania	89	84	89	89	90	83	524	
38	Nikola Šaranović	Montenegro	83	84	90	88	91	88	524	

=== Final ===
Choi had a 7-point lead over Jin (5th place in qualifying) and a 3-point lead over Wang going into the finals; Jin never hit lower than 9.5 in first 9 finals shots to close the gap while Wang fell to nearly 3 points out of second. Choi still held a 1.6-point lead over Jin going into the last shot, but scored only 8.1 while Jin put his final shot in the 10-ring to pass him and repeat as gold medalist.

Rank	Shooter	Nation	Qualifying	Final											Total
Rank	Shooter	Nation	Qualifying	1	2	3	4	5	6	7	8	9	10	Total	Total
1st place, gold medalist(s)	Jin Jong-oh	South Korea	562	10.2	9.5	9.8	9.8	10.6	10.6	9.5	10.3	9.5	10.2	100.0	662.0
2nd place, silver medalist(s)	Choi Young-Rae	South Korea	569	8.8	9.8	10.5	9.8	7.4	10.5	9.2	9.0	9.4	8.1	92.5	661.5
3rd place, bronze medalist(s)	Wang Zhiwei	China	566	10.3	9.0	8.7	7.2	9.7	8.4	10.1	8.9	9.7	10.6	92.6	658.6
4	Hoàng Xuân Vinh	Vietnam	563	9.6	8.3	10.1	9.3	9.7	10.0	10.4	10.6	7.3	10.2	95.5	658.5
5	Giuseppe Giordano	Italy	559	9.5	10.2	10.5	9.6	8.6	9.1	10.6	10.3	9.2	9.4	97.0	656.0
6	Andrija Zlatić	Serbia	564	8.1	10.2	8.9	9.3	7.7	9.3	10.3	10.4	10.1	7.6	91.9	655.9
7	Christian Reitz	Germany	560	10.1	7.3	8.1	8.9	10.7	10.3	10.8	9.0	10.2	8.9	94.3	654.3
8	Leonid Yekimov	Russia	560	9.0	9.1	10.3	9.7	9.9	9.6	8.6	8.8	10.4	6.6	92.0	652.0
