= Kim Kyeong-ae (sport shooter) =

South Korean sport shooter (born 1989)

Personal information
- Nationality: South Korea
- Born: 12 November 1989 (age 36) Daegu, South Korea
- Height: 1.62 m (5 ft 4 in)
- Weight: 55 kg (121 lb)

Sport
- Sport: Shooting
- Events: 10 m air pistol (AP40); 25 m pistol (SP)
- Club: East Hall Daegu South Ward
- Coached by: Lim Jang-su
Medal record
Women's shooting
Representing South Korea
Asian Championships
Silver medal – second place	2012 Doha	25 m pistol team

Korean name
- Hangul: 김경애
- RR: Gim Gyeongae
- MR: Kim Kyŏngae

Kim Kyeong-ae (Korean: 김경애; born November 12, 1989, in Daegu) is a South Korean sport shooter. She is also a member of the shooting team for East Hall Daegu South Ward, and is coached and trained by Lim Jang-su.

Kim represented South Korea at the 2012 Summer Olympics in London, where she competed in the women's 25 m pistol, along with her teammate Kim Jang-mi, who eventually won a gold medal in the final. Kim shot 286 targets in the precision stage, and 296 in the rapid-fire, for a total score of 582 points and a bonus of 19 inner tens, finishing in eleventh place.
