= Li Peijing =

Chinese sport shooter

Medal record

Women's shooting

Representing China

Asian Championships
Gold medal – first place	2012 Doha	50 m rifle 3 positions team
Silver medal – second place	2012 Doha	50 m rifle prone
Silver medal – second place	2012 Doha	50 m rifle prone team
Silver medal – second place	2012 Doha	50 m rifle 3 positions

Li Peijing (born 22 May 1989 in Shaanxi) is a Chinese rifle shooter. She competed in the 50 m rifle 3 positions event at the 2012 Summer Olympics, where she placed 9th.
