= Yuan Jing (sport shooter) =

Chinese sport shooter

Personal information
- Nationality: China
- Born: 27 March 1987 (age 39) Wuxi, Jiangsu, China
- Height: 1.65 m (5 ft 5 in)
- Weight: 65 kg (143 lb)

Sport
- Sport: Shooting
- Events: 10 m air pistol (AP40); 25 m pistol (SP)
Medal record
Women's shooting
Representing China
Asian Championships
Gold medal – first place	2012 Doha	25 m pistol team
Bronze medal – third place	2012 Doha	25 m pistol

Yuan Jing (simplified Chinese: 袁静; traditional Chinese: 袁靜; pinyin: Yuán Jìng; born March 27, 1987, in Wuxi, Jiangsu) is a Chinese sport shooter. She won a gold medal in the women's sport pistol at the 2011 ISSF World Cup series in Munich, Germany, with a total score of 787.8 points, earning her a spot on the Chinese team for the Olympics.

Yuan represented China at the 2012 Summer Olympics in London, where she competed in the women's 25 m pistol, along with her teammate and defending Olympic champion Chen Ying. Yuan shot 288 targets in the precision stage, and 291 in the rapid-fire, for a total score of 579 points and a bonus of 18 inner tens, finishing only in twentieth place.
