= Wang Tao (sport shooter) =

Chinese sports shooter

Personal information
- Nationality: Chinese
- Born: 13 December 1982 (age 43) Hunan, China
- Height: 170 cm (5 ft 7 in)
- Weight: 76 kg (168 lb)

Sport
- Sport: Sports shooting
Medal record
Men's shooting
Representing China
Asian Championships
Gold medal – first place	2012 Doha	10 m air rifle team
Bronze medal – third place	2012 Doha	10 m air rifle

Wang Tao (Chinese: 王涛; pinyin: Wáng Tāo; born 13 December 1982) is a Chinese sports shooter. He competed in the Men's 10 metre air rifle event at the 2012 Summer Olympics, finishing in fourth.
