= Wang Zhiwei =

Chinese sport shooter (born 1988)

Personal information
- Nationality: Chinese
- Born: 18 July 1988 (age 37) Jinzhong, Shanxi, China
- Height: 1.78 m (5 ft 10 in)
- Weight: 75 kg (165 lb)
Medal record
Men's shooting
Representing China
Olympic Games
Bronze medal – third place	2012 London	50 m pistol
Asian Championships
Gold medal – first place	2015 Kuwait City	10 m air pistol team
Silver medal – second place	2012 Doha	10 m air pistol
Silver medal – second place	2015 Kuwait City	50 m pistol team

Wang Zhiwei (Chinese: 王智伟; pinyin: Wáng Zhìwěi; born 18 July 1988) is a Chinese sport shooter who competes in the men's pistol. At the 2012 Summer Olympics in Beijing, he won the bronze medal in the men's 50 metre pistol.
