= ISSF 50 meter pistol =

Sport shooting event

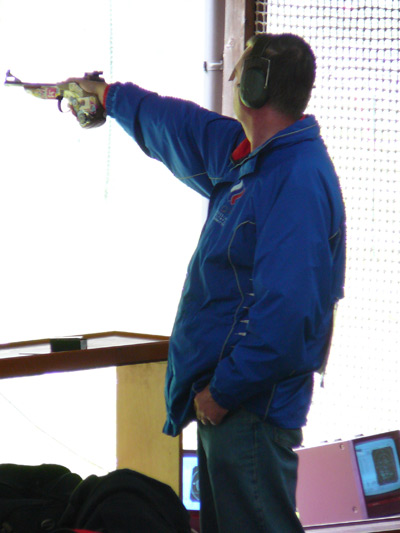

Men
- Number of shots: 60 + 20
- Olympic Games: 1896–2016
- World Championships: Since 1900
- Abbreviation: FP

50 meter pistol, formerly and unofficially still often called Free Pistol, is one of the ISSF shooting events. It is one of the oldest shooting disciplines, dating back to the 19th century and only having seen marginal rule changes since 1936. It is considered to provide some of the purest precision shooting among the pistol events. The target of this event has not changed since 1900, and the 50m distance has remained the standard since 1912. The sport traced back to the beginning of indoor Flobert pistol parlour shooting in Europe during the 1870s.

Most shooters excelling in 50 m pistol also compete at the same level in 10 meter air pistol, a similar precision event. Free pistol was removed from the Olympic program following the 2016 Olympic Games.

== Equipment ==
The pistol used must be chambered in caliber .22 Long Rifle ammunition, may only be loaded with one round at a time, and must have conventional "open" or "iron" sights (i.e. optical and laser sights are not allowed). It must also be held and operated by one hand, the trigger actuated by squeezing (not releasing), and may not be supported by any other part of the shooter's body.

Apart from that, there are practically no rules for the pistol, explaining the former name of the event. Trigger weight may be as low as the shooter pleases, the grip may be designed in any way to enhance comfortable ergonomic fit as long as it does not touch the wrist for support, and there are no restrictions on size and weight. Precision pistols with long barrels, grips fitted to the shooter's hand, very light trigger pull, etc., are often themselves called free pistols.

Competitors have been using the small-bore, rim-fire cartridges since 1908, with the last alternative round to the .22 Long Rifle, the .22 Extra Long, going out of production in the mid-1930s.

== Course of fire ==
The course of fire is 60 shots within a maximum time of two hours. The target is the same as in 25 meter center-fire pistol, but at double the distance, resulting in a lower result level. 570 out of the maximum 600 is considered a world-class result. The current world record, 583, was achieved in the World shooting Championships Granada in 2014 by the South Korean Jin Jong-oh. The previous world record of 581 points was scored by Kyrgyzstan-born Alexander Melentyev in the 1980 Moscow games, stood for 34 years, and still remains the Olympic record.

Most of the historic changes concern distance (30m, 50m, 50 yards), caliber (.22 .22lr .44CF), type of pistol (revolver only, revolver or pistol, any pistol), time allowed (16 hours, 6 hours, 3 hours, 2 hours, 1 hour and 15 minutes), and most recently, format of the finals (carry over scores, start from zero, number of shots fired in the finals).

50 m Pistol was officially removed as an Olympic medal event in 2017, making the Rio games of 2016 the last for the "Free Pistol" shooters. However, it is still part of other major ISSF competitions; most notably the World Shooting Championships.

== World Championships, Men ==
Year	Place	Gold	Silver	Bronze
1900	(France) Paris	Karl Röderer (SUI)	Achille Paroche (FRA)	Konrad Stäheli (SUI)
1901	(Switzerland) Luzern	Karl Hess (SUI)	Louis Richardet (SUI)	Raphael Py (FRA)
1902	(Italy) Rome	Karl Hess (SUI)	Konrad Stäheli (SUI)	Raphael Py (FRA)
1903	(Argentina) Buenos Aires	Benjamin Segura (ARG)	Cesare Valerio (ITA)	Marcelo Torcuato de Alvear (ARG)
1904	(France) Lyon	Paul Van Asbroeck (BEL)	Paul Probst (SUI)	Raphael Py (FRA)
1905	(Belgium) Brussels	Julien van Asbroeck (BEL)	Paul Van Asbroeck (BEL)	Charles Paumier du Verger (BEL)
1906	(Italy) Milan	Konrad Stäheli (SUI)	Paul Van Asbroeck (BEL)	Charles Paumier du Verger (BEL)
1907	(Switzerland) Zürich	Paul Van Asbroeck (BEL)	Charles Paumier du Verger (BEL)	Konrad Stäheli (SUI)
1908	(Austria) Vienna	Richard Fischer (GER)	Cristoforo Buttafava (ITA)	Agoston Dietl (HUN)
1909	(Germany) Hamburg	Paul Van Asbroeck (BEL)	Eduard Schmeisser (GER)	Konrad Stäheli (SUI)
1910	(Netherlands) Loosduinen	Paul Van Asbroeck (BEL)	Eduard Ehricht (GER)	Charles Paumier du Verger (BEL)
1911	(Italy) Rome	Charles Paumier du Verger (BEL)	Jean Carrère (FRA)	Norbert Van Molle (BEL)
1912	(France) Bayonne Biarritz	Paul Van Asbroeck (BEL)	Paul Maujean (FRA)	Caspar Widmer (SUI)
1913	(United States) Camp Perry	Wilhelm Carlberg (SWE)	Alfred Lane (USA)	Casimir Reuterskiöld (SWE)
1914	(Denmark) Viborg	Paul Van Asbroeck (BEL)	Mathias Brunner (SUI)	André Regaud (FRA)
1921	(France) Lyon	Hans Haenni (SUI)	John Thomas (USA)	Giancarlo Boriani (ITA)
1922	(Italy) Milan	Hans Haenni (SUI)	Camillo Isnardi (ITA)	Robert Blum (SUI)
1923	(United States) Camp Perry	Irving Romaro Calkins (USA)	Charles Price (USA)	R. G. Wescott (USA)
1924	(France) Reims	Wilhelm Schnyder (SUI)	Paul Van Asbroeck (BEL)	Christian Lehrman (DEN)
1925	(Switzerland) St. Gallen	Wilhelm Schnyder (SUI)	Robert Blum (SUI)	Paul Van Asbroeck (BEL)
1927	(Italy) Rome	Wilhelm Schnyder (SUI)	August Wiederkehr (SUI)	Charles des Jammonières (FRA)
1928	(Netherlands) Loosduinen	Wilhelm Schnyder (SUI)	Charles des Jammonières (FRA)	Fritz Zulauf (SUI)
1929	(Sweden) Stockholm	Fritz Zulauf (SUI)	Jakob Fisher (SUI)	Oscar Ericsson (SWE)
1930	(Belgium) Antwerp	Lean Revilliod de Bude (SUI)	Marcel Jean Josse Lafortune (BEL)	Wilhelm Schnyder (SUI)
1931	(Poland) Lvov	Marcel Bonin (FRA)	Vaclav Kreck (TCH)	Severin Crivelli (SUI)
1933	(Spain) Granada	Torsten Elis Ullman (SWE)	Charles des Jammonières (FRA)	Severin Crivelli (SUI)
1935	(Italy) Rome	Torsten Elis Ullman (SWE)	Erich Krempel (GER)	Walter Buechi (SUI)
1937	(Finland) Helsinki	Torsten Elis Ullman (SWE)	Walter Buechi (SUI)	Jacques Louis Mazoyer (FRA)
1939	(Switzerland) Luzern	Erich Krempel (GER)	Torsten Elis Ullman (SWE)	Ambrus Balogh (HUN)
1947	(Sweden) Stockholm	Torsten Elis Ullman (SWE)	Oscar Bidegain (ARG)	Karl Axel Wallen (SWE)
1949	(Argentina) Buenos Aires	Beat Rhyner (SUI)	Harry Wendell Reeves (USA)	Angel Leon de Gonzalo (ESP)
1952	(Norway) Oslo	Torsten Elis Ullman (SWE)	Aeke Lindblom (SWE)	Huelet Benner (USA)
1954	(Venezuela) Caracas	Huelet Benner (USA)	Torsten Elis Ullman (SWE)	Anton Jasinsky (URS)
1958	(Soviet Union) Moscow	Makhmud Umarov (URS)	Aleksey Gushchin (URS)	Nelson Hayford Lincoln (USA)
1962	(Egypt) Cairo	Vladimir Stolypin (URS)	Yoshihisa Yoshikawa (JPN)	Ludwig Hemauer (SUI)
1966	(West Germany) Wiesbaden	Vladimir Stolypin (URS)	Dencho Denev (BUL)	Hynek Hromada (TCH)
1970	(United States) Phoenix	Harald Vollmar (GDR)	Dencho Denev (BUL)	Hynek Hromada (TCH)
1974	(Switzerland) Thun	Georgi Zapolskich (URS)	Ivan Némethy (TCH)	Harald Vollmar (GDR)
1978	(South Korea) Seoul	Moritz Minder (SUI)	Ragnar Skanåker (SWE)	Karl-Otto Westphalen (FRG)
1982	(Venezuela) Caracas	Ragnar Skanåker (SWE)	Alexsander Melentiev (URS)	Anatoli Egrishin (URS)
1986	(East Germany) Suhl	Sergei Pyzhianov (URS)	Igor Basinski (URS)	Gyula Karacsony (HUN)
1990	(Soviet Union) Moscow	Spas Koprinkov (BUL)	Yifu Wang (CHN)	Sergei Pyzhianov (URS)
1994	(Italy) Milan	Yifu Wang (CHN)	Viktor Makarov (UKR)	Franck Dumoulin (FRA)
1998	(Spain) Barcelona	Franck Dumoulin (FRA)	Hans-Jürgen Bauer-Neumaier (GER)	Igor Basinski (BLR)
2002	(Finland) Lahti	Zongliang Tan (CHN)	Martin Tenk (CZE)	Vladimir Gontcharov (RUS)
2006	(Croatia) Zagreb	Zongliang Tan (CHN)	Vigilio Fait (ITA)	Vladimir Isakov (RUS)
2010	(Germany) Munich	Tomoyuki Matsuda (JPN)	Lee Dae-myung (KOR)	Vyacheslav Podlesnyy (KAZ)
2014	(Spain) Granada	Jin Jong-oh (KOR)	Jitu Rai (IND)	Wei Pang (CHN)
2018	(South Korea) Changwon	Om Prakash Mitharval (IND)	Damir Mikec (SRB)	Daemyung Lee (KOR)
2022	(Egypt) New Administrative Capital	Damir Mikec (SRB)	Zhang Bowen (CHN)	Viktor Bankin (UKR)

== World Championships, Men Team ==
Year	Place	Gold	Silver	Bronze
1900	(France) Paris	(Switzerland) Switzerland; Friedrich Lüthi; Paul Probst; Karl Röderer; Louis Richardet; Konrad Stäheli	(France) France; Louis Dutfoy; Maurice Marie Lecoq; Achille Paroche; Léon Moreaux; Trinite	(Netherlands) Netherlands; Antonius Hubertus Maria Bouwens; Anthony Ahasuerus Henrik Sweijs; Henrik Sillem; Gerardus van Haan; Solko Johannes van Den Bergh
1901	(Switzerland) Luzern	(Switzerland) Switzerland; Karl Hess; Paul Probst; Louis Richardet; Karl Röderer; Konrad Stäheli	(France) France; Louis Dutfoy; Maurice Faure; Achille Paroche; Raphael Py; Trinite	(Italy) Italy; L. Borgogelli; Cristoforo Buttafava; G. Giuliozzi; A. Righini; R. Tagliabue
1902	(Italy) Rome	(Switzerland) Switzerland; Karl Hess; J. Lang; Karl Röderer; A. Roch; Konrad Stäheli	(Italy) Italy; P. Castellano; A. Righini; G. Sandri; R. Tagliabue; L. Tavelli	(France) France; Caurette; Louis Dutfoy; Léon Moreaux; Raphael Py; Athanase Sartori
1903	(Argentina) Buenos Aires	(Argentina) Argentina; Marcelo Torcuato de Alvear; Angel Velaz; Jorge Lubary; Benjamin Segura; Andres Del Pino	(Italy) Italy; Attilio Conti; A. Pederzoli; A. Righini; L. Tavelli; Cesare Valerio	
1904	(France) Lyon	(Switzerland) Switzerland; Karl Hess; Paul Probst; Louis Richardet; Karl Röderer; Konrad Stäheli	(Argentina) Argentina; Jose Fernandez; Marcelo Torcuato de Alvear; Alberto Pero; Pedro Partarrie; Benjamin Segura	(France) France; Caurette; Jean Fouconnier; Molinie-Paget; Léon Moreaux; Raphael Py
1905	(Belgium) Brussels	(Belgium) Belgium; Julien van Asbroeck; Paul Van Asbroeck; Rene Englebert; Charles Paumier du Verger; Victor Robert	(Switzerland) Switzerland; Mathias Brunner; F. Jaques; Karl Hess; Louis Richardet; Konrad Stäheli	(France) France; André Barbillat; Andre de Castelbajac; Jean Depassis; Louvier; Léon Moreaux
1906	(Italy) Milan	(Belgium) Belgium; Rene Englebert; Charles Paumier du Verger; Julien van Asbroeck; Victor Robert; Paul Van Asbroeck	(Switzerland) Switzerland; Louis Richardet; Karl Röderer; Konrad Stäheli; J. Schalcher; Karl Hess	(France) France; André Barbillat; Jean Fouconnier; Louvier; Léon Moreaux; Raphael Py
1907	(Switzerland) Zürich	(Belgium) Belgium; Julien van Asbroeck; Paul Van Asbroeck; Charles Paumier du Verger; Victor Robert; Réginald Storms	(Switzerland) Switzerland; Mathias Brunner; Karl Hess; J. Schalcher; Konrad Stäheli; Caspar Widmer	(France) France; André Barbillat; Andre de Castelbajac; Jean Depassis; Léon Moreaux; Raphael Py
1908	(Austria) Vienna	(Italy) Italy; Cristoforo Buttafava; Daniele Bonicelli; Gian Galeazzo Cantoni; Raffaele Frasca; A. Righini	(Belgium) Belgium; Julien van Asbroeck; Paul Van Asbroeck; Charles Paumier du Verger; Réginald Storms; Victor Robert	(France) France; André Barbillat; Andre de Castelbajac; Duvoir; Léon Moreaux; André Regaud
1909	(Germany) Hamburg	(Germany) Germany; Gerhard Bock; Richard Fischer; Eduard Ehricht; Eduard Schmeisser; J. Vogel	(Switzerland) Switzerland; Mathias Brunner; Karl Hess; Karl Röderer; Konrad Stäheli; E. Wanner	(France) France; André Barbillat; Maurice Faure; Léon Moreaux; André Regaud; Raphael Py
1910	(Netherlands) Loosduinen	(Belgium) Belgium; Rene Englebert; Charles Paumier du Verger; Paul Van Asbroeck; Norbert Van Molle; Wullemans	(Italy) Italy; Raffaele Frasca; G. Mussino; A. Righini; Ricardo Ticchi; C. Vercellone	(Germany) Germany; Gerhard Bock; Eduard Ehricht; Richard Fischer; Eduard Schmeisser; J. Vogel
1911	(Italy) Rome	(Belgium) Belgium; Norbert Van Molle; Serruys; Philippe Cammaerts; Paul Van Asbroeck; Charles Paumier du Verger	(Germany) Germany; Gassmann; Eduard Ehricht; Richard Fischer; Eduard Schmeisser; J. Vogel	(Switzerland) Switzerland; Mathias Brunner; J. Landry; Karl Röderer; Konrad Stäheli; Caspar Widmer
1912	(France) Bayonne Biarritz	(Belgium) Belgium; Paul Van Asbroeck; Philippe Cammaerts; Charles Paumier du Verger; Norbert Van Molle; Serruys	(France) France; André Barbillat; Jean Carrère; Andre de Castelbajac; Paul Maujean; André Regaud	(Italy) Italy; Alfredo Galli; Raffaele Frasca; L. Moretto; G. Mussino; Ricardo Ticchi
1913	(United States) Camp Perry	(United States) United States; James Howard Snook; John Dietz; Alfred Lane; C. McCutcheon; P. Hanford	(France) France; Jean Carrère; Girardot; Léon Johnson; André Regaud; Louis Percy	(Sweden) Sweden; Wilhelm Carlberg; Otto Christiansson; Sigvard Hultcrantz; Loewman; Casimir Reuterskiöld
1914	(Denmark) Viborg	(Italy) Italy; Alfredo Galli; Raffaele Frasca; L. Moretto; R. Preda; Ricardo Ticchi	(France) France; André Barbillat; Jean Carrère; Girardot; Léon Johnson; André Regaud	(Belgium) Belgium; Paul Van Asbroeck; Louis Andrieu; Henri Sauveur Fils; Victor Robert; Serruys
1921	(France) Lyon	(Italy) Italy; Giancarlo Boriani; Raffaele Frasca; Franco Micheli; L. Moretto; Ricardo Ticchi	(Switzerland) Switzerland; Mathias Brunner; Domenico Giambonini; Hans Haenni; Fritz Zulauf; Caspar Widmer	(France) France; Léon Johnson; Paul Maujean; R. Pecchia; André Regaud; Louis Tetart
1922	(Italy) Milan	(Switzerland) Switzerland; Robert Blum; Hans Haenni; F. Koenig; Wilhelm Schnyder; Fritz Zulauf	(Italy) Italy; L. Corba; Camillo Isnardi; Franco Micheli; L. Moretto; Ricardo Ticchi	(United States) United States; Irving Romaro Calkins; J. Considine; Karl Telford Frederick; Alfred Lane; Paul Raymond
1923	(United States) Camp Perry	(United States) United States; Irving Romaro Calkins; J. Dunn; Karl Telford Frederick; Charles Price; R. G. Wescott		
1924	(France) Reims	(Switzerland) Switzerland; Mathias Brunner; Robert Blum; Hans Haenni; F. Koenig; Wilhelm Schnyder	(France) France; Andre de Castelbajac; Keller-Dorian; Paul Maujean; Gilles Petit; Veyssiere	(Denmark) Denmark; F. Frederiksen; C. Jensen; Christian Lehrman; Lars Jørgen Madsen; Christen Moeller
1925	(Switzerland) St. Gallen	(France) France; Charles des Jammonières; Keller-Dorian; R. Pecchia; Gilles Petit; Louis Tetart	(Switzerland) Switzerland; F. Balmer; Robert Blum; Hans Haenni; F. Koenig; Wilhelm Schnyder	(Denmark) Denmark; F. Frederiksen; C. Jensen; Niels Hansen Ditlev Larsen; Christian Lehrman; Christen Moeller
1927	(Italy) Rome	(Switzerland) Switzerland; F. Balmer; Robert Blum; Wilhelm Schnyder; August Wiederkehr; Fritz Zulauf	(Denmark) Denmark; A. Boll; Christian Lehrman; P. Moeller; Christen Moeller; Erik Sætter-Lassen	(Spain) Spain; Antonio Bonilla Sanmartin; Jose Bento Lopez; Luis Calvet Sandoz; Julio Castro Del Rosario; G. Martinez
1928	(Netherlands) Loosduinen	(Switzerland) Switzerland; Robert Blum; Jakob Fisher; Wilhelm Schnyder; August Wiederkehr; Fritz Zulauf	(Spain) Spain; Luis Calvet Sandoz; Jose Bento Lopez; Julio Castro Del Rosario; G. Martinez; C. Romero	(France) France; Andre de Castelbajac; Charles des Jammonières; Keller-Dorian; R. Pecchia
1929	(Sweden) Stockholm	(Switzerland) Switzerland; Robert Blum; Jakob Fisher; Lean Revilliod de Bude; Wilhelm Schnyder; Fritz Zulauf	(Spain) Spain; Jose Bento Lopez; Luis Calvet Sandoz; J. Esquena; G. Martinez; C. Romero	(France) France; Marcel Bonin; Andre de Castelbajac; Charles des Jammonières; P. Gremeaux; G. Regis
1930	(Belgium) Antwerp	(Switzerland) Switzerland; Ernst Flückiger; Severin Crivelli; Lean Revilliod de Bude; Wilhelm Schnyder; Fritz Zulauf	(France) France; Marcel Bonin; Charles des Jammonières; Gantier; P. Gremeaux; G. Regis	(Denmark) Denmark; A. Boll; C. Jensen; Niels Hansen Ditlev Larsen; Christian Lehrman; Axel Lerche
1931	(Poland) Lvov	(Switzerland) Switzerland; Ernst Flückiger; Severin Crivelli; Lean Revilliod de Bude; Wilhelm Schnyder; Fritz Zulauf	(France) France; Marcel Bonin; Andre de Castelbajac; Charles des Jammonières; P. Gremeaux; Neveu	(Finland) Finland; A. Granholm; Viktor Miinalainen; Karl-Gustaf Svensson; S. Timonen; Vilenius
1933	(Spain) Granada	(Switzerland) Switzerland; E. Andres; F. Bullo; Ernst Flueckiger; Severin Crivelli; Wilhelm Schnyder	(France) France; M. Brion; Marcel Bonin; Charles des Jammonières; René Koch; Neveu	(Spain) Spain; Botllan; Jose Bento Lopez; J. Esquena; G. Martinez; C. Romero
1935	(Italy) Rome	(Switzerland) Switzerland; E. Andres; E. Flueckiger; Severin Crivelli; F. Leibundgut; Walter Buechi	(Italy) Italy; Giancarlo Boriani; B. Capone; Stefano Margotti; C. Maresca; Ugo Pistolesi	(Germany) Germany; H. Beltzner; Erich Krempel; G. Lorenz; Emil Martin; Paul Wehner
1937	(Finland) Helsinki	(Switzerland) Switzerland; Walter Buechi; Ernst Flueckiger; Severin Crivelli; Hans Gaemperli; Walter Schaffner	(Finland) Finland; Klaus Henrik Lahti; Aatto Johannes Nuora; Jaakko Rintanen; Klaus Suokontu; Tapio Vartiovaara	(Sweden) Sweden; Gustaf Bergstroem; Bertli Gustafsson; Helge Meuller; Torsten Elis Ullman; Gotfrid von Rooth
1939	(Switzerland) Luzern	(Switzerland) Switzerland; Heinz Ambuehl; E. Andres; Walter Buechi; Ernst Flueckiger; W. Muster	(Sweden) Sweden; Gustaf Bergstroem; Bertli Gustafsson; Kristian Sjoeberg; Torsten Elis Ullman; Gotfrid von Rooth	(Germany) Germany; W. Kraft; Erich Krempel; F. Krempel; Emil Martin; Paul Wehner
1947	(Sweden) Stockholm	(Argentina) Argentina; Oscar Bidegain; Pablo Cagnasso; Federico Grüben; Federico Manes; Alberto Martijena	(Sweden) Sweden; Sven Lundquist; Sture Nordlund; G. Schoett; Karl Axel Wallen; Torsten Elis Ullman	(Switzerland) Switzerland; Heinz Ambuehl; E. Flueckiger; W. Schaffner; Beat Rhyner; Alexander Specker
1949	(Argentina) Buenos Aires	(Argentina) Argentina; Oscar Bidegain; Pablo Cagnasso; Antonio Cannavo; Federico Grüben; Alberto Martijena	(Sweden) Sweden; Hugo Lundqvist; Sven Lundquist; Sture Nordlund; Goesta Pihl; Torsten Elis Ullman	(United States) United States; Huelet Leo Benner; W. Hancock; C. Logie; Harry Wendell Reeves; W. Toney
1952	(Norway) Oslo	(Sweden) Sweden; Aeke Lindblom; Sture Nordlund; Hugo Lundqvist; G. Schoett; Torsten Elis Ullman	(Switzerland) Switzerland; Heinz Ambuehl; Heinrich Keller; Beat Rhyner; Rudolf Schnyder; Alexander Specker	(Finland) Finland; Veli-Jussi Hoelsoe; Klaus Henrik Lahti; Leonard Ravilo; Oiva Kalerva Tylli; S. Widnaes
1954	(Venezuela) Caracas	(Soviet Union) Soviet Union; Vladimir Demin; Anton Jasinsky; Konstantin Martazov; Evgeni Polikanin; Lev Vainshtein	(United States) United States; R. Anthony; Huelet Leo Benner; John Dodds; Harry Wendell Reeves; Offutt Pinion	(Sweden) Sweden; Aeke Lindblom; Leif Uno Larsson; Hugo Lundqvist; G. Preutz; Torsten Elis Ullman
1958	(Soviet Union) Moscow	(Soviet Union) Soviet Union; Aleksey Gushchin; Anton Jasinsky; Makhmud Umarov; Lev Vainshtein; Anatoli Zapolski	(United States) United States; William Blankenship; Nelson Hayford Lincoln; D. Miller; Offutt Pinion; Raymond Sutherland	(Czechoslovakia) Czechoslovakia; Jiří Hrneček; Vladimír Kudrna; Karel Mucha; František Maxa; Josef Šváb
1962	(Egypt) Cairo	(Soviet Union) Soviet Union; Mihail Akulov; Aleksey Gushchin; Grigori Kosych; Vladimir Stolypin	(United States) United States; William Blankenship; Lloyd Burchett; Franklin Green; Frederik Schaser	(Switzerland) Switzerland; Ludwig Hemauer; Frédéric Michel; Albert Spaeni; Ernst Stoll
1966	(West Germany) Wiesbaden	(Soviet Union) Soviet Union; Grigori Kosych; Evgeni Raskazov; Vladimir Stolypin; Albert Udachin	(Switzerland) Switzerland; Ludwig Hemauer; Fritz Lehmann; Albert Spaeni; Ernst Stoll	(Poland) Poland; Jozef Frydel; Henryk Siek; Rajmund Stachurski; Józef Zapędzki
1970	(United States) Phoenix, Arizona	(Soviet Union) Soviet Union; Grigori Kosych; Vladimir Stolypin; Anatoli Egrishin; Boris Yermakov	(East Germany) East Germany; Helmut Artelet; Harald Vollmar; Heinz Szurlies; Gert Schreiber	(Poland) Poland; Karol Chodkiewicz; Zbigniew Fedyczak; Paweł Małek; Rajmund Stachurski
1974	(Switzerland) Thun	(Soviet Union) Soviet Union; Anatoli Egrishin; Grigori Kosych; Igor Raenko; Georgi Zapolskich	(Czechoslovakia) Czechoslovakia; Vladimír Hyka; Hynek Hromada; Ivan Némethy; Milos Stefan	(Austria) Austria; Hubert Garschall; Hans-Peter Schmidt; Othmar Schneider; Heinz Tschabrun
1978	(South Korea) Seoul	(Switzerland) Switzerland; Herbert Binder; Roman Burkhard; Moritz Minder; Arno Rissi	(Japan) Japan; Chikafumi Hirai; Mamoru Inagaki; Fumihisa Semizuki; Shigetoshi Tashiro	(West Germany) West Germany; Klaus Bolbrock; Alfons Messerschmidt; Udo Scharf; Karl-Otto Westphalen
1982	(Venezuela) Caracas	(Soviet Union) Soviet Union; Anatoli Egrishin; Alexsander Melentiev; Sergei Sumatokhin; Vladas Turla	(United States) United States; Erich Buljung; Jimmie Mc Coy; Don Nygord; Eugene Ross	(China) China; Zhijian Chou; Zhibo Su; Ming Wang; Yifu Wang
1986	(East Germany) Suhl	(Soviet Union) Soviet Union; Igor Basinski; Alexsander Melentiev; Sergei Pyzhianov	(Sweden) Sweden; Benny Oestlund; Pertti Paeaekkoenen; Ragnar Skanåker	(East Germany) East Germany; Gernot Eder; Michael Hochmuth; Uwe Potteck
1990	(Soviet Union) Moscow	(Hungary) Hungary; István Ágh; Csaba Gyorik; Zoltán Papanitz	(Soviet Union) Soviet Union; Igor Basinski; Alexsander Melentiev; Sergei Pyzhianov	(Sweden) Sweden; Bengt Kamis; Benny Oestlund; Ragnar Skanåker
1994	(Italy) Milan	(Ukraine) Ukraine; Oleksandr Bliznuchenko; Volodymyr Ivanchuk; Viktor Makarov	(Russia) Russia; Boris Kokorev; Sergei Pyzhianov; Sergei Poliakov	(China) China; Jinbao Li; Yifu Wang; Haifeng Xu
1998	(Spain) Barcelona	(China) China; Yifu Wang; Dan Xu; Zongliang Tan	(Russia) Russia; Mikhail Nestruev; Boris Kokorev; Vladimir Gontcharov	(Belarus) Belarus; Igor Basinski; Siarhei Yurusau; Kanstantsin Lukashyk
2002	(Finland) Lahti	(China) China; Zongliang Tan; Yifu Wang; Dan Xu	(Russia) Russia; Vladimir Gontcharov; Mikhail Nestruev; Boris Kokorev	(Ukraine) Ukraine; Viktor Makarov; Oleg Dronov; Ivan Rybovalov
2006	(Croatia) Zagreb	(China) China; Zongliang Tan; Zhongzai Lin; Xiao Wu	(Russia) Russia; Vladimir Gontcharov; Vladimir Isakov; Mikhail Nestruev	(Italy) Italy; Francesco Bruno; Vigilio Fait; Giuseppe Giordano
2010	(Germany) Munich	(South Korea) South Korea; Lee Dae-myung; Jin Jong-oh; Han Seung-Woo	(China) China; Zhang Tian; Jing Wu; Wei Pang	(Spain) Spain; Pablo Carrera; Miguel Salvador Gimenez; Pablo Garcia
2014	(Spain) Granada	(China) China; Zhiwei Wang; Wei Pang; Qifeng Pu	(South Korea) South Korea; Lee Dae-myung; Jin Jong-oh; Choi Young-rae	(North Korea) North Korea; Kim Jong-su; Kim Song-guk; Kwon Tong-hyok
2018	(South Korea) Changwon	South Korea; Lee Dae-myung; Park Dae-hun; Han Seung-woo	Serbia; Damir Mikec; Dusko Petrov; Dimitrije Grgić	China; Wu Jiayu; Pu Qifeng; Zhang Bingchen

== World Championships, Women ==
Year	Place	Gold	Silver	Bronze
2022	(Egypt) New Administrative Capital	Jiang Ranxin (CHN)	Sylvia Steiner (AUT)	Nigar Nasirova (AZE)

== World Championships, Mixed Team ==
Year	Place	Gold	Silver	Bronze
2022	(Egypt) New Administrative Capital	China; Jiang Ranxin; Zhang Bowen	Mongolia; Tsogbadrakhyn Mönkhzul; Enkhtaivany Davaakhüü	Poland; Katarzyna Klepacz; Szymon Wojtyna China; Li Xue; Liu Jinyao

== World Championships, total medals ==
Rank	Nation	Gold	Silver	Bronze	Total
1	Switzerland	30	16	14	60
2	Belgium	14	6	6	26
3	Soviet Union	13	4	3	20
4	Sweden	8	8	7	23
5	China	7	2	3	12
6	United States	4	8	5	17
7	Argentina	4	2	1	7
8	France	3	14	17	34
9	Italy	3	9	4	16
10	Germany	3	5	3	11
11	South Korea	2	2	0	4
12	Bulgaria	1	2	0	3
12	Japan	1	2	0	3
14	East Germany	1	1	2	4
15	Ukraine	1	1	1	3
16	Hungary	1	0	3	4
17	Russia	0	4	2	6
18	Czechoslovakia	0	3	3	6
19	Spain	0	2	4	6
20	Denmark	0	1	4	5
21	Finland	0	1	2	3
22	Czech Republic	0	1	0	1
22	India	0	1	0	1
24	Belarus	0	0	2	2
24	Poland	0	0	2	2
24	West Germany	0	0	2	2
27	Austria	0	0	1	1
27	Kazakhstan	0	0	1	1
27	Netherlands	0	0	1	1
27	North Korea	0	0	1	1
Totals (30 entries)		96	95	94	285

== World Cup Final ==
ISSF has introduced a series of World Cup competitions for Olympic shooting events in 1986, and the final has been held at the end of each season since 1988.

Year	Place	Gold	Silver	Bronze
1988	(West Germany) Munich	Sergei Pyzhianov (URS)	Gernot Eder (GDR)	Igor Basinski (URS)
1989	(West Germany) Munich	Zoltán Papanitz (HUN)	Uwe Potteck (GDR)	Boris Kokorev (URS)
1990	(West Germany) Munich	Xu Haifeng (CHN)	Sergei Pyzhianov (URS)	Gernot Eder (GDR)
1991	(Germany) Munich	Tanyu Kiriakov (BUL)	Roberto Di Donna (ITA)	Sorin Babii (ROM)
1992	(Germany) Munich	Spas Koprinkov (BUL)	Sergei Pyzhianov (RUS)	Tanyu Kiriakov (BUL)
1993	(Germany) Munich	Ragnar Skanåker (SWE)	Boris Kokorev (RUS)	Xu Haifeng (CHN)
1994	(Germany) Munich	Viktor Makarov (UKR)	Tanyu Kiriakov (BUL)	Roberto Di Donna (ITA)
1995	(Germany) Munich	Roberto Di Donna (ITA)	Tanyu Kiriakov (BUL)	Xu Dan (CHN)
1996	(Switzerland) Naefels	Roberto Di Donna (ITA)	Franck Dumoulin (FRA)	Sergei Pyzhianov (RUS)
1997	(Switzerland) Lugano	Boris Kokorev (RUS)	Roberto Di Donna (ITA)	Xu Dan (CHN)
1998	(Switzerland) Zürich	Boris Kokorev (RUS)	Franck Dumoulin (FRA)	Wang Yifu (CHN)
1999	(Germany) Munich	Wang Yifu (CHN)	Martin Tenk (CZE)	Zoltán Papanitz (HUN)
2000	(Germany) Munich	Franck Dumoulin (FRA)	Tanyu Kiriakov (BUL)	Martin Tenk (CZE)
2001	(Germany) Munich	Mikhail Nestruev (RUS)	Dilshod Mukhtarov (UZB)	Martin Tenk (CZE)
2002	(Germany) Munich	Tan Zongliang (CHN)	Mikhail Nestruev (RUS)	Vladimir Gontcharov (RUS)
2003	(Italy) Milan	Xu Dan (CHN)	Martin Tenk (CZE)	Wang Yifu (CHN)
2004	(Thailand) Bangkok	Martin Tenk (CZE)	Shi Xinglong (CHN)	Tan Zongliang (CHN)
2005	(Germany) Munich	Boris Kokorev (RUS)	Lin Zhongzai (CHN)	Vladimir Isakov (RUS)
2006	(Spain) Granada	Vladimir Isakov (RUS)	Xu Kun (CHN)	Boris Kokorev (RUS)
2007	(Thailand) Bangkok	Lin Zhongzai (CHN)	Boris Kokorev (RUS)	Tan Zongliang (CHN)
2008	(Thailand) Bangkok	Jin Jong-oh (KOR)	Tomoyuki Matsuda (JPN)	Vladimir Isakov (RUS)
2009	(China) Wuxi	Jin Jong-oh (KOR)	Joao Costa (POR)	Pavol Kopp (SVK)
2010	(Germany) Munich	Daryl Szarenski (USA)	Vladimir Isakov (RUS)	Tomoyuki Matsuda (JPN)
2011	(Poland) Wrocław	Andrija Zlatić (SRB)	Leonid Ekimov (RUS)	Tomoyuki Matsuda (JPN)
2012	(Thailand) Bangkok	Zhang Tian (CHN)	Tomoyuki Matsuda (JPN)	Leonid Ekimov (RUS)
2013	(Germany) Munich	Wang Zhiwei (CHN)	Tomoyuki Matsuda (JPN)	Jin Jong-oh (KOR)
2014	(Azerbaijan) Gabala	Wang Zhiwei (CHN)	Tomoyuki Matsuda (JPN)	Pang Wei (CHN)
2015	(Germany) Munich	Zhang Bowen (CHN)	Hoàng Xuân Vinh (VNM)	Wang Zhiwei (CHN)

== Current world records ==
Current world records in 50 metre pistol
Men	Qualification	583	Jin Jong-oh (KOR)	September 9, 2014	Granada (ESP)
Men	Final	230.1	Jitu Rai (IND)	March 01, 2017	New Delhi India
Teams	1719	Romania (Babii, Ilie, Stan)	September 7, 1985	Osijek (YUG)	
Junior Men	Individual	577	Spas Koprinkov (BUL)	August 9, 1990	Moscow (URS)
Junior Men	Teams	1666	Bulgaria (Georgiev, Ivanov, Simeonov)	August 4, 1988	Joensuu (FIN)

== Olympic and World Champions ==
Jin Jong-oh is the only triple (and double) Olympic champion in 50 metre pistol; he is the only shooter to have won three consecutive Olympic gold medals in one event. World Championships were held annually up to the 1931 then biennially until 1954 (the current quadrennial format was introduced afterwards), which made a few long streaks possible, but after World War II few shooters have been able to win two major World-level titles (the Olympics and the World Championships); Jin is the only one to have won three or more since the World Championships intervals were changed to the current quadrennial format. Paul Van Asbroeck has won the most of Olympic and World titles combined with seven titles (1 Olympics and 6 World titles). Torsten Ullman won six (1 Olympic, 5 World titles) over the span of 1933–1952, including four successive Championships between 1933 and 1937 (including the 1936 Summer Olympics). Wilhem Schnyder won four consecutive World Championships between 1924 and 1928. Van Asbroeck, Ullman, Huelet Benner and Jin are only ones to have held the Olympic and the World titles simultaneously.

Another rare double is that between this precision event and its direct opposite 25 meter rapid fire pistol; this has only been accomplished by Alfred Lane (completed in 1912), Torsten Ullman (1939), Huelet Benner (1952) and Pentti Linnosvuo (1964), with Lane (in one Olympics) and Linnosvuo winning only Olympic titles. Benner, on the other hand, is the only shooter with two titles in both events. Several athletes have won 50 metre pistol and 10 metre air pistol titles; Jin is the only person to have done so at the (single) Olympics.

ISSF World Cup Series has been held since 1986 with the World Cup Final at the end of the season since 1988; Ragnar Skanåker and Jin are the only two to have won this competition as well as the Olympic and World titles. Skanåker's 1993 World Cup Final victory was achieved at the age of 59; it was also his last international victory.

The distance of the Free Pistol event was 30 metres initially. This was because 30 metres was used in the German Championship, the most important competition at the time. Starting from the 1900 Olympics, which also served as the first world championship for Free Pistol, the distance was set to 50 metres. Both the distance and the target remained the same to this day, with the exception of the 1908 Olympics in which the distance changed from 50 metres to 50 yards.

Free Pistol was not held between the 1920 and 1936 Olympics. This is due to the perception of the time that pistol shooters, especially in free pistol, were professionals who competed in tournaments which awarded prized money. The strict amateur status required by the IOC ran counter against UIT (ISSF) and the money and medal awarding system of the target pistol shooting competition tradition. The best shooters in the world such as Wilhelm Schnyder and his Swiss teammates with their Häuptli pistols would dominate the world championships, but were denied the chance to compete in the Olympics. With the exception of 1923 when they did not compete, from 1921 to 1939 the Swiss either won the individual or the team World titles, or both. Adolf Hitler made sure shooting was part of the 1936 program as he was eager to demonstrate his country's military prowess, including a brand-new special-designed Walther pistol for the rapid fire event.

Year	Venue	Individual	Winning pistol	Team	Juniors	Team
1896	Athens	Sumner Paine (USA)	Smith & Wesson New Model 3 Revolver			
1900^{1}	Paris	Karl Röderer (SUI)	Waffenfabrik Bern 1882 Swiss Ordnance Revolver	Switzerland		
1901	Luzern	Karl Hess (SUI)	Waffenfabrik Bern 1882 Swiss Ordnance Revolver	Switzerland		
1902	Rome	Karl Hess (SUI)	Waffenfabrik Bern 1882 Swiss Ordnance Revolver	Switzerland	Alfred Lane at the 1912 Olympics	
1903	Buenos Aires	Benjamin Segura (ARG)	Unknown revolver	Argentina	Alfred Lane at the 1912 Olympics	
1904	Lyon	Paul Van Asbroeck (BEL)	Unknown revolver	Switzerland	Alfred Lane at the 1912 Olympics	
1905	Brussels	Julien Van Asbroeck (BEL)	Sauveur HS-6	Belgium	Alfred Lane at the 1912 Olympics	
1906	Milan	Konrad Stäheli (SUI)	DWM 1900 Swiss Ordnance Luger PP00	Belgium	Alfred Lane at the 1912 Olympics	
1907	Zürich	Paul Van Asbroeck (BEL)	Sauveur HS-6	Belgium	Alfred Lane at the 1912 Olympics	
1908	Vienna	Richard Fischer (GER)	Büchel Stecherspanner	Italy	Alfred Lane at the 1912 Olympics	
1908	London	Paul Van Asbroeck (BEL)	Sauveur HS-6	United States	Alfred Lane at the 1912 Olympics	
1909	Hamburg	Paul Van Asbroeck (BEL)	Sauveur HS-6	Germany	Alfred Lane at the 1912 Olympics	
1910	Loosduinen	Paul Van Asbroeck (BEL)	Sauveur HS-6	Belgium	Alfred Lane at the 1912 Olympics	
1911	Rome	Charles Paumier du Verger (BEL)	Büchel Tell	Belgium	Alfred Lane at the 1912 Olympics	
1912	Bayonne–Biarritz	Paul Van Asbroeck (BEL)	Büchel Tell	Belgium	Alfred Lane at the 1912 Olympics	
1912	Stockholm	Alfred Lane (USA)	Smith & Wesson Perfected Third Model	United States		
1913	Camp Perry	Vilhelm Carlberg (SWE)	Büchel Tell	United States		
1914	Viborg	Paul Van Asbroeck (BEL)	Büchel Tell	Italy	Alexander Melentyev, the 1980 Olympic Champion and Current Olympic record holder	
1920	Antwerp	Karl Frederick (USA)	Smith & Wesson Perfected Third Model	United States	Alexander Melentyev, the 1980 Olympic Champion and Current Olympic record holder	
1921	Lyon	Hans Hänni (SUI)	Häuptli 1	Italy	Alexander Melentyev, the 1980 Olympic Champion and Current Olympic record holder	
1922	Milan	Hans Hänni (SUI)	Häuptli 1	Switzerland	Alexander Melentyev, the 1980 Olympic Champion and Current Olympic record holder	
1923	Camp Perry	Irving Romaro Calkins (USA)	Smith & Wesson Perfected Third Model	United States	Alexander Melentyev, the 1980 Olympic Champion and Current Olympic record holder	
1924	Reims	Wilhelm Schnyder (SUI)	Häuptli 2	Switzerland	Alexander Melentyev, the 1980 Olympic Champion and Current Olympic record holder	
1925	St. Gallen	Wilhelm Schnyder (SUI)	Häuptli 2	France	Alexander Melentyev, the 1980 Olympic Champion and Current Olympic record holder	
1927	Rome	Wilhelm Schnyder (SUI)	Häuptli 2	Switzerland	Alexander Melentyev, the 1980 Olympic Champion and Current Olympic record holder	
1928	Loosduinen	Wilhelm Schnyder (SUI)	Häuptli 2	Switzerland	Alexander Melentyev, the 1980 Olympic Champion and Current Olympic record holder	
1929	Stockholm	Fritz Zulauf (SUI)	Häuptli 2	Switzerland	Alexander Melentyev, the 1980 Olympic Champion and Current Olympic record holder	
1930	Antwerp	Lean Revilliod de Bude (SUI)	Häuptli 1	Switzerland	Alexander Melentyev, the 1980 Olympic Champion and Current Olympic record holder	
1931	Lwów	Marcel Bonin (FRA)	Unknown	Switzerland	Alexander Melentyev, the 1980 Olympic Champion and Current Olympic record holder	
1933	Granada	Torsten Ullman (SWE)	Udo Anschütz Record 210	Switzerland		
1935	Rome	Torsten Ullman (SWE)	Udo Anschütz Record 210	Switzerland		
1936	Berlin	Torsten Ullman (SWE)	Udo Anschütz Record 210			
1937	Helsinki	Torsten Ullman (SWE)	Udo Anschütz Record 210	Switzerland		
1939	Luzern	Erich Krempel (GER)	Walter Munk Zentrum 2	Switzerland	Mikhail Nestruyev, the 2004 Olympic Champion	
1947	Stockholm	Torsten Ullman (SWE)	Hämmerli MP33	Argentina	Mikhail Nestruyev, the 2004 Olympic Champion	
1948	London	Edwin Vásquez (PER)	Hämmerli MP33		Mikhail Nestruyev, the 2004 Olympic Champion	
1949	Buenos Aires	Beat Rhyner (SUI)	Hämmerli MP33	Argentina	Mikhail Nestruyev, the 2004 Olympic Champion	
1952	Oslo	Torsten Ullman (SWE)	Hämmerli MP33	Sweden	Mikhail Nestruyev, the 2004 Olympic Champion	
1952	Helsinki	Huelet Benner (USA)	Hämmerli 100 ^{2}		Mikhail Nestruyev, the 2004 Olympic Champion	
1954	Caracas	Huelet Benner (USA)	Hämmerli 100	Soviet Union	Mikhail Nestruyev, the 2004 Olympic Champion	
1956	Melbourne	Pentti Linnosvuo (FIN)	Hämmerli 100		Mikhail Nestruyev, the 2004 Olympic Champion	
1958	Moscow	Makhmud Umarov (URS)	Hämmerli 100	Soviet Union	Mikhail Nestruyev, the 2004 Olympic Champion	
1960	Rome	Alexei Gushchin (URS)	Izhmash Isch 1		Mikhail Nestruyev, the 2004 Olympic Champion	
1962	Cairo	Vladimir Stolypin (URS)	Tula TOZ 35	Soviet Union	Mikhail Nestruyev, the 2004 Olympic Champion	
1964	Tokyo	Väinö Markkanen (FIN)	Hämmerli 101		Mikhail Nestruyev, the 2004 Olympic Champion	
1966	Wiesbaden	Vladimir Stolypin (URS)	Tula TOZ 35	Soviet Union	Jin Jong-oh, the only triple (2008, 2012, 2016) and the last Olympic Champion and Current World Record holder	
1968	Mexico City	Grigori Kosych (URS)	TsKIB SOO MЦ55		Jin Jong-oh, the only triple (2008, 2012, 2016) and the last Olympic Champion and Current World Record holder	
1970	Phoenix	Harald Vollmar (GDR)	Tula TOZ 35	Soviet Union	Jin Jong-oh, the only triple (2008, 2012, 2016) and the last Olympic Champion and Current World Record holder	
1972	Munich	Ragnar Skanåker (SWE)	TsKIB SOO MЦ55		Jin Jong-oh, the only triple (2008, 2012, 2016) and the last Olympic Champion and Current World Record holder	
1974	Thun	Gregori Zapolski (URS)	TsKIB SOO MЦ55	Soviet Union	Jin Jong-oh, the only triple (2008, 2012, 2016) and the last Olympic Champion and Current World Record holder	
1976	Montreal	Uwe Potteck (GDR)	Tula TOZ 35		Jin Jong-oh, the only triple (2008, 2012, 2016) and the last Olympic Champion and Current World Record holder	
1978	Seoul	Moritz Minder (SUI)	Tula TOZ 35 60°	Switzerland	Jin Jong-oh, the only triple (2008, 2012, 2016) and the last Olympic Champion and Current World Record holder	
1980	Moscow	Aleksandr Melentiev (URS)	TsKIB SOO MЦ55		Jin Jong-oh, the only triple (2008, 2012, 2016) and the last Olympic Champion and Current World Record holder	
1982	Caracas	Ragnar Skanåker (SWE)	Hämmerli 152	Soviet Union	Jin Jong-oh, the only triple (2008, 2012, 2016) and the last Olympic Champion and Current World Record holder	
1984	Los Angeles	Xu Haifeng (CHN)	Hämmerli 150		Jin Jong-oh, the only triple (2008, 2012, 2016) and the last Olympic Champion and Current World Record holder	
1986	Suhl	Sergei Pyzhianov (URS)	Tula TOZ 35	Soviet Union	Jin Jong-oh, the only triple (2008, 2012, 2016) and the last Olympic Champion and Current World Record holder	
1988	Seoul	Sorin Babii (ROU)	Tula TOZ 35		Jin Jong-oh, the only triple (2008, 2012, 2016) and the last Olympic Champion and Current World Record holder	
1990	Moscow	Spas Koprinkov (BUL)	Hämmerli 150	Hungary		
1992	Barcelona	Kanstantsin Lukashyk (EUN)	Tula TOZ 35			
1994	Milan	Wang Yifu (CHN)	Morini CM84E	Ukraine	Anatolie Corovai (MDA)	Moldova
1996	Atlanta	Boris Kokorev (RUS)	Tula TOZ 35			
1998	Barcelona	Franck Dumoulin (FRA)	TsKIB SOO MЦ55-1	China	Andrija Zlatić (YUG)	Poland
2000	Sydney	Tanyu Kiryakov (BUL)	Hämmerli 152			
2002	Lahti	Tan Zongliang (CHN)	Morini CM84E	China	Vladimir Issachenko (KAZ)	Ukraine
2004	Athens	Mikhail Nestruyev (RUS)	Morini CM84E			
2006	Zagreb	Tan Zongliang (CHN)	Morini CM84E	China	Pu Qifeng (CHN)	China
2008	Beijing	Jin Jong-oh (KOR)	Morini CM84E			
2010	Munich	Tomoyuki Matsuda (JPN)	Morini CM84E	South Korea	Tomasz Palamarz (POL)	Germany
2012	London	Jin Jong-oh (KOR)	Morini CM84E			
2014	Granada	Jin Jong-oh (KOR)	Morini CM84E	China	Andrey Pochepko (RUS)	China
2016	Rio de Janeiro	Jin Jong-oh (KOR)	Morini CM84E			

^{1} The Olympic competitions in Paris also counted as the 1900 World Championships. ^{2} Same model as MP33. Name changed by new company owner.
