= Shooting at the 2000 Summer Olympics – Men's 50 metre pistol =

Men's 50 metre pistol at the Games of the XXVII Olympiad
- Shooting pictogram
- Venue: Sydney International Shooting Centre
- Date: 19 September 2000
- Competitors: 36 from 27 nations
- Winning score: 666.0

Medalists
1st place, gold medalist(s)		Tanyu Kiryakov; Bulgaria
2nd place, silver medalist(s)		Igor Basinski; Belarus
3rd place, bronze medalist(s)		Martin Tenk; Czech Republic

The men's ISSF 50 meter pistol competition at the 2000 Summer Olympics was held on 19 September. There were 36 competitors from 27 nations. Nations had been limited to two shooters each since the 1952 Games. Tanyu Kiryakov won, becoming the first shooter to win Olympic gold medals in both this event and 10 metre air pistol. 2.7 points behind, Igor Basinski won his fourth Olympic medal (third in this event—the third man to earn three in the free pistol—and second in the 2000 Games, after a bronze in the 10 metre air pistol). Kiryakov's gold was Bulgaria's first free pistol victory, and the first medal of any color in the event for the nation since 1980. Martin Tenk's bronze was the Czech Republic's first medal in the event.

== Background ==
This was the 20th appearance of the ISSF 50 meter pistol event. The event was held at every Summer Olympics from 1896 to 1920 (except 1904, when no shooting events were held) and from 1936 to 2016; it was open to women from 1968 to 1980. 1896 and 1908 were the only Games in which the distance was not 50 metres; the former used 30 metres and the latter 50 yards.

All eight finalists from the 1996 Games returned: gold medalist Boris Kokorev of Russia, silver medalist (and 1988 bronze medalist) Igor Basinski of Belarus, bronze medalist Roberto Di Donna of Italy, fourth-place finisher (and 1992 gold medalist) Kanstantsin Lukashyk of Belarus, fifth-place finisher Vigilio Fait of Italy, sixth-place finisher (and 1992 silver and 1984 bronze medalist and 1988 and 1992 finalist) Wang Yifu of China, seventh-place finisher Martin Tenk of the Czech Republic, and eighth-place finisher Sergio Sánchez of Guatemala. Also returning was 1992 finalist Tanyu Kiryakov of Bulgaria. The 1998 world championship podium was Franck Dumoulin of France, Hans-Jürgen Bauer-Neumaier of Germany, and Basinski; all three were competing in Sydney.

Kazakhstan and Namibia each made their debut in the event. The United States made its 18th appearance, most of any nation, having missed only the 1900 event and the boycotted 1980 Games.

Kiryakov used a Hämmerli 152.

== Competition format ==
The competition featured two rounds, qualifying and final. The qualifying round was the same as the previous competitions: each shooter fired 60 shots, in 6 series of 10 shots each, at a distance of 50 metres. The target was round, 50 centimetres in diameter, with 10 scoring rings. Scoring for each shot was up to 10 points, in increments of 1 point. The maximum score possible was 600 points. The top 8 shooters advanced to a final; ties necessary for qualifying were broken by 6th-series score, while other ties were not broken. They shot an additional series of 10 shots, with the score added to their qualifying round score to give a 70-shot total. The 1996 competition had added decimal scoring to the final; shots could score up to 10.9 for the final. The total maximum was therefore 709.0. Ties were broken first by final round score. Any pistol was permitted.

== Records ==
The existing world and Olympic records were as follows.

Qualifying (60 shots)
World record	Aleksandr Melentiev (URS)	581	Moscow, Soviet Union	20 July 1980
Olympic record	Aleksandr Melentiev (URS)	581	Moscow, Soviet Union	20 July 1980

Final (70 shots)
World record	William Demarest (USA)	676.2	Milan, Italy	4 June 2000
Olympic record	Boris Kokorev (RUS)	666.4	Atlanta, United States	23 July 1996

No new world or Olympic records were set during the competition.

== Schedule ==
Date	Time	Round
Tuesday, 19 September 2000	9:00	Qualifying; Final

== Results ==
=== Qualifying ===
Rank	Shooter	Nation	Score	Notes
1	Tanyu Kiryakov	Bulgaria	570	Q
2	Igor Basinski	Belarus	569	Q
3	Martin Tenk	Czech Republic	566	Q
4	Dilshod Mukhtarov	Uzbekistan	565	Q
5	Vladimir Gontcharov	Russia	564	Q
6	Wang Yifu	China	563	Q
7	Vladimir Guchsha	Kazakhstan	562	Q
8	Roberto Di Donna	Italy	560	Q 6th series: 96
9	Sorin Babii	Romania	560	6th series: 93
9	Kanstantsin Lukashyk	Belarus	560	6th series: 94
9	Jerzy Pietrzak	Poland	560	6th series: 93
12	Franck Dumoulin	France	559	
12	Boris Kokorev	Russia	559	
14	Masaru Nakashige	Japan	558	
14	Xu Dan	China	558	
16	Dionissios Georgakopoulos	Greece	557	
16	Sergio Werner Sanchez Gomez	Guatemala	557	
18	Alexander Danilov	Israel	556	
18	David Moore	Australia	556	
20	Hans-Jürgen Bauer-Neumaier	Germany	553	
20	Vigilio Fait	Italy	553	
20	David Porter	Australia	553	
23	William Demarest	United States	552	
23	Noriyuki Nishitani	Japan	552	
25	Daryl Szarenski	United States	550	
26	Stéphane Gagne	France	549	
27	João Costa	Portugal	548	
27	Ján Fabo	Slovakia	548	
27	Chris Rice	Virgin Islands	548	
30	Norbelis Bárzaga	Cuba	547	
31	Tarek Riad	Egypt	544	
32	Artur Gevorgjan	Germany	543	
32	Friedhelm Sack	Namibia	543	
34	Felipe Beuvrín	Venezuela	542	
34	Yuri Melentiev	Kyrgyzstan	542	
36	Christián Muñoz Ortega	Chile	537	

=== Final ===
Rank	Shooter	Nation	Qualifying	Final	Total
1st place, gold medalist(s)	Tanyu Kiryakov	Bulgaria	570	96.0	666.0
2nd place, silver medalist(s)	Igor Basinski	Belarus	569	94.3	663.3
3rd place, bronze medalist(s)	Martin Tenk	Czech Republic	566	96.5	662.5
4	Vladimir Gontcharov	Russia	564	98.2	662.2
5	Dilshod Mukhtarov	Uzbekistan	565	97.0	662.0
6	Wang Yifu	China	563	96.0	659.0
7	Roberto Di Donna	Italy	560	97.3	657.3
8	Vladimir Guchsha	Kazakhstan	562	93.8	655.8

== Sources ==
- Official Report of the XXVII Olympiad — Shooting (PDF).
