= Shooting at the 2000 Summer Olympics – Men's 10 metre air pistol =

Sports shooting at the Olympics

Men's 10 metre air pistol at the Games of the XXVII Olympiad
- Venue: Sydney International Shooting Centre
- Date: 16 September 2000
- Competitors: 43 from 30 nations
- Winning score: 688.9 (OR)

Medalists
1st place, gold medalist(s)		Franck Dumoulin	France
2nd place, silver medalist(s)		Wang Yifu	China
3rd place, bronze medalist(s)		Igor Basinski	Belarus

The men's 10 metre air pistol competition at the 2000 Summer Olympics was held on 16 September, the day after the opening ceremony. Franck Dumoulin and Wang Yifu both reached 590 points in the qualification round of 60 shots, raising the Olympic record by three points. Although both shooters performed considerably worse in the final, their seven-point gap to the bronze medal was quite safe. Dumoulin outperformed Wang by two points, setting a new final Olympic record.

== Records ==
Prior to this competition, the existing world and Olympic records were as follows.

Qualification records
World record	Sergei Pyzhianov (URS)	593	Munich, West Germany	13 October 1989
Olympic record	Wang Yifu (CHN)	587	Atlanta, United States	20 July 1996

Final records
World record	Sergei Pyzhianov (URS)	695.1 (593+102.1)	Munich, West Germany	13 October 1989
Olympic record	Wang Yifu (CHN)	684.8	Barcelona, Spain	28 July 1992

== Qualification round ==
Rank	Athlete	Country	Score	Notes
1	Wang Yifu	China	590	Q OR
2	Franck Dumoulin	France	590	Q OR
3	Mikhail Nestruyev	Russia	583	Q
4	Igor Basinski	Belarus	583	Q
5	João Costa	Portugal	581	Q
6	Roberto Di Donna	Italy	581	Q
7	Stéphane Gagne	France	581	Q
8	Tanyu Kiryakov	Bulgaria	581	Q
9	Vladimir Gontcharov	Russia	579	
9	Dilshod Mukhtarov	Uzbekistan	579	
11	Sorin Babii	Romania	578	
11	Jerzy Pietrzak	Poland	578	
11	Tan Zongliang	China	578	
11	Martin Tenk	Czech Republic	578	
15	Michael Douglass	United States	577	
15	Kanstantsin Lukashyk	Belarus	577	
17	Ján Fabo	Slovakia	576	
17	Dionissios Georgakopoulos	Greece	576	
17	Yuri Melentiev	Kyrgyzstan	576	
20	Hans-Jürgen Bauer-Neumaier	Germany	575	
20	Artur Gevorgjan	Germany	575	
20	Paolo Ranno	Italy	575	
23	William Demarest	United States	574	
23	Vladimir Guchsha	Kazakhstan	574	
25	Masaru Nakashige	Japan	573	
26	Boris Kokorev	Russia	572	
27	Vigilio Fait	Italy	571	
27	Tarek Riad	Egypt	571	
29	Lajos Pálinkás	Hungary	570	
30	Felipe Beuvrín	Venezuela	569	
30	Iulian Raicea	Romania	569	
32	David Moore	Australia	567	
33	Norbelis Bárzaga	Cuba	566	
34	Friedhelm Sack	Namibia	565	
34	Sergio Werner Sanchez Gomez	Guatemala	565	
36	Noriyuki Nishitani	Japan	564	
37	Ricardo Chandeck	Panama	562	
38	David Porter	Australia	561	
39	Chris Rice	Virgin Islands	560	
40	Christián Muñoz Ortega	Chile	559	
41	Luis Méndez	Uruguay	556	
42	István Jambrik	Hungary	555	
	Alexander Danilov	Israel		DQ

DQ Disqualified – OR Olympic record – Q Qualified for final

== Final ==
Rank	Athlete	Qual	Final	Total	Notes
1st place, gold medalist(s)	Franck Dumoulin (FRA)	590	98.9	688.9	OR
2nd place, silver medalist(s)	Wang Yifu (CHN)	590	96.9	686.9	
3rd place, bronze medalist(s)	Igor Basinski (BLR)	583	99.7	682.7	
4	Mikhail Nestruyev (RUS)	583	99.3	682.3	
5	Stéphane Gagne (FRA)	581	101.0	682.0	
6	Roberto Di Donna (ITA)	581	99.5	680.5	
7	João Costa (POR)	581	98.4	679.4	
8	Tanyu Kiryakov (BUL)	581	95.8	676.8	

OR Olympic record

== Sources ==
- Official Report of the XXVII Olympiad — Shooting (PDF).
