= Shooting at the 2004 Summer Olympics – Men's 10 metre air pistol =

Sports shooting at the Olympics

Men's 10 metre air pistol at the Games of the XXVIII Olympiad
- Venue: Markópoulo Olympic Shooting; Centre
- Date: 14 August 2004
- Competitors: 47 from 35 nations
- Winning score: 690.0 OR

Medalists
1st place, gold medalist(s)		Wang Yifu	China
2nd place, silver medalist(s)		Mikhail Nestruyev	Russia
3rd place, bronze medalist(s)		Vladimir Isakov	Russia

The men's 10 metre air pistol competition at the 2004 Summer Olympics was held on 14 August at the Markópoulo Olympic Shooting Centre near Athens, Greece.

The event consisted of two rounds: a qualifier and a final. In the qualifier, each shooter fired 60 shots with an air pistol at 10 metres distance. Scores for each shot were in increments of 1, with a maximum score of 10.

The top 8 shooters in the qualifying round moved on to the final round. There, they fired an additional 10 shots. These shots scored in increments of 0.1, with a maximum score of 10.9. The total score from all 70 shots was used to determine final ranking.

2002 World champion Mikhail Nestruyev of Russia had attained a score of 591 to break a new Olympic record in the qualification round, until Chinese shooter and six-time Olympian Wang Yifu caught him up on the last shot to grab his second Olympic gold (the first being done in Barcelona 1992) in the event by an immensely thin 0.2-point margin, finishing with a total of 690.0 to 689.8. Nestruyev's countryman Vladimir Isakov, on the other hand, took the bronze medal with 684.3, edging out 1988 champion Tanyu Kiryakov of Bulgaria by almost a single point.

France's Franck Dumoulin, who eluded Wang for an Olympic gold in Sydney 2000, failed to reach the final round after slipping off from his title defense to share a twentieth place tie with four other shooters in the prelims.

== Records ==
Prior to this competition, the existing world and Olympic records were as follows.

Qualification records
World record	Sergei Pyzhianov (URS)	593	Munich, Germany	13 October 1989
Olympic record	Wang Yifu (CHN)	590	Sydney, Australia	16 September 2000

Final records
World record	Sergei Pyzhianov (URS)	695.1 (593+102.1)	Munich, Germany	13 October 1989
Olympic record	Franck Dumoulin (FRA)	688.9 (590+98.9)	Sydney, Australia	16 September 2000

== Qualification round ==
Rank	Athlete	Country	1	2	3	4	5	6	Total	Notes
1	Mikhail Nestruyev	Russia	99	99	98	100	97	98	591	Q, OR
2	Wang Yifu	China	99	98	96	99	99	99	590	Q
3	Vladimir Isakov	Russia	98	95	99	99	97	96	584	Q
4	Kim Hyon-ung	North Korea	96	98	96	99	96	98	583	Q
5	Tanyu Kiryakov	Bulgaria	97	95	100	97	96	98	583	Q
6	Norayr Bakhtamyan	Armenia	98	98	96	95	96	99	582	Q
7	Jin Jong-oh	South Korea	95	96	98	98	97	98	582	Q
8	Kim Jong-su	North Korea	96	98	96	97	97	98	582	Q
9	Tan Zongliang	China	99	100	94	98	95	96	582	
10	Sergey Babikov	Tajikistan	93	97	95	99	99	98	581	
11	Igor Basinski	Belarus	96	98	96	96	98	96	580	
11	Wojciech Knapik	Poland	96	94	98	98	98	96	580	
13	Sorin Babii	Romania	100	97	93	98	97	94	579	
13	Kanstantsin Lukashyk	Belarus	97	97	95	96	98	96	579	
13	Daryl Szarenski	United States	97	96	98	95	98	95	579	
13	Andrija Zlatić	Serbia and Montenegro	97	94	98	97	94	99	579	
17	Francesco Bruno	Italy	94	96	99	96	96	97	578	
17	João Costa	Portugal	97	95	99	95	97	95	578	
17	Viktor Makarov	Ukraine	96	99	99	94	96	94	578	
20	Alexander Danilov	Israel	96	96	100	95	95	95	577	
20	Franck Dumoulin	France	98	91	98	98	95	97	577	
20	Martin Tenk	Czech Republic	93	97	96	98	98	95	577	
23	Vigilio Fait	Italy	97	95	93	96	98	97	576	
23	Vladimir Issachenko	Kazakhstan	93	98	98	96	97	94	576	
23	Masaru Nakashige	Japan	96	94	96	99	97	94	576	
23	Abdulla Ustaoglu	Germany	93	96	98	95	97	97	576	
27	Roger Daniel	Trinidad and Tobago	96	95	94	95	98	96	574	
27	Lee Sang-do	South Korea	95	94	96	96	96	97	574	
27	David Moore	Australia	95	95	98	95	96	95	574	
30	Norbelis Bárzaga	Cuba	94	96	96	96	97	94	573	
30	Artur Gevorgjan	Germany	96	96	94	96	95	96	573	
30	Shuji Tazawa	Japan	93	97	97	95	92	99	573	
33	José Antonio Colado	Spain	96	97	93	98	98	90	572	
33	Dionissios Georgakopoulos	Greece	94	97	93	95	96	97	572	
33	Friedhelm Sack	Namibia	94	98	97	92	95	96	572	
36	Jakkrit Panichpatikum	Thailand	88	98	97	97	96	95	571	
36	Daniel Repacholi	Australia	94	95	95	96	97	94	571	
36	Jason Turner	United States	96	92	95	97	94	97	571	
39	Iulian Raicea	Romania	92	94	97	94	98	95	570	
40	Chang Yi-ning	Chinese Taipei	97	91	97	95	96	93	569	
41	Nguyễn Mạnh Tường	Vietnam	93	92	92	99	97	95	568	
42	Isidro Lorenzo	Spain	96	93	93	93	93	97	565	
43	Attila Simon	Hungary	90	94	95	97	92	94	562	
44	Maximo Modesti	Argentina	94	90	94	93	94	94	559	
45	Khalid Mohamed	Bahrain	94	93	93	91	90	92	553	
46	Chris Rice	Virgin Islands	88	88	93	94	91	97	551	
47	Rudolf Knijnenburg	Bolivia	94	82	90	94	92	96	548	

OR Olympic record – Q Qualified for final

== Final ==
Rank	Athlete	Qual	1	2	3	4	5	6	7	8	9	10	Final	Total	Notes
1st place, gold medalist(s)	Wang Yifu (CHN)	590	10.5	9.9	10.0	10.0	9.8	10.5	10.2	8.9	10.3	9.9	100.0	690.0	OR
2nd place, silver medalist(s)	Mikhail Nestruyev (RUS)	591	9.5	10.5	10.3	9.6	10.1	10.1	9.5	10.2	9.3	9.7	98.8	689.8	
3rd place, bronze medalist(s)	Vladimir Isakov (RUS)	584	10.8	9.4	9.3	9.8	10.3	9.9	10.4	10.5	9.5	10.4	100.3	684.3	
4	Tanyu Kiryakov (BUL)	583	10.7	9.7	9.9	9.8	9.7	10.7	10.0	9.3	10.3	10.3	100.4	683.4	
5	Jin Jong-oh (KOR)	582	9.9	10.0	10.4	10.4	10.3	10.0	10.0	9.9	10.1	9.9	100.9	682.9	
6	Kim Hyon-ung (PRK)	583	10.1	9.4	10.2	9.8	9.0	10.7	9.6	9.6	10.4	10.2	99.0	682.0	
7	Norayr Bakhtamyan (ARM)	582	10.2	9.1	10.2	10.4	9.6	10.4	8.9	10.4	10.3	10.4	99.9	681.9	
8	Kim Jong-su (PRK)	582	10.1	10.3	10.1	10.2	9.4	8.5	9.9	9.9	10.5	10.3	99.2	681.2	
