= Shooting at the 1992 Summer Olympics =

Shooting at the Games of the XXV Olympiad

The shooting competitions at the 1992 Summer Olympics took place at a shooting range complex in Mollet del Vallès outside Barcelona, Spain. Competitions were held in a total of thirteen events — seven men's events, four women's events, and two events open to both genders. It was the first time a woman (Zhang Shan in the skeet competition) took a gold medal in such an open event, and also the last time they were held.

It was also the first games for 10 metre running target, which replaced 50 metre running target on the Olympic program, as well as the first games with the new targets in all rifle and pistol events except 50 metre pistol, leading to numerous automatic Olympic records.

The shooting events at the 1992 Olympics mark the first time that Independent Olympic Participants (from Yugoslavia after their country was suspended), competing under the Olympic flag, have won medals in any sport at any Olympic competition.

== Medal summary ==
=== Medal table ===
Rank	Nation	Gold	Silver	Bronze	Total
1	Unified Team	5	2	1	8
2	China	2	2	0	4
3	Germany	2	0	1	3
4	South Korea	2	0	0	2
5	United States	1	1	0	2
6	Czechoslovakia	1	0	1	2
7	Bulgaria	0	2	1	3
8	Independent Olympic Participants	0	1	2	3
9	Japan	0	1	1	2
10	France	0	1	0	1
10	Latvia	0	1	0	1
10	Norway	0	1	0	1
10	Peru	0	1	0	1
14	Italy	0	0	2	2
15	Mongolia	0	0	1	1
15	Poland	0	0	1	1
15	Romania	0	0	1	1
15	Sweden	0	0	1	1
Totals (18 entries)		13	13	13	39

=== Men's events ===
Games	Gold	Silver	Bronze
air pistol	Wang Yifu; China	Sergei Pyzhianov; Unified Team (Russia)	Sorin Babii; Romania
air rifle	Yuri Fedkin; Unified Team (Russia)	Franck Badiou; France	Johann Riederer; Germany
pistol	Kanstantsin Lukashyk; Unified Team (Belarus)	Wang Yifu; China	Ragnar Skanåker; Sweden
rapid fire pistol	Ralf Schumann; Germany	Afanasijs Kuzmins; Latvia	Vladimir Vokhmyanin; Unified Team (Kazakhstan)
rifle prone	Lee Eun-chul; South Korea	Harald Stenvaag; Norway	Stevan Pletikosić; Independent Olympic Participants
rifle three positions	Hrachya Petikyan; Unified Team (Armenia)	Robert Foth; United States	Ryohei Koba; Japan
running target	Michael Jakosits; Germany	Anatoli Asrabayev; Unified Team (Russia)	Luboš Račanský; Czechoslovakia

=== Women's events ===
Games	Gold	Silver	Bronze
air pistol	Marina Logvinenko; Unified Team (Russia)	Jasna Šekarić; Independent Olympic Participants	Mariya Grozdeva; Bulgaria
air rifle	Yeo Kab-soon; South Korea	Vesela Letcheva; Bulgaria	Aranka Binder; Independent Olympic Participants
pistol	Marina Logvinenko; Unified Team (Russia)	Li Duihong; China	Dorjsürengiin Mönkhbayar; Mongolia
rifle three positions	Launi Meili; United States	Nonka Matova; Bulgaria	Małgorzata Książkiewicz; Poland

=== Open events ===
Games	Gold	Silver	Bronze
skeet	Zhang Shan; China	Juan Giha; Peru	Bruno Rossetti; Italy
trap	Petr Hrdlička; Czechoslovakia	Kazumi Watanabe; Japan	Marco Venturini; Italy

== Participating nations ==
A total of 407 shooters, 290 men and 117 women, from 83 nations competed at the Barcelona Games:

- Albania (2)
- Andorra (1)
- Argentina (2)
- Australia (7)
- Austria (5)
- Bangladesh (1)
- Barbados (1)
- Belgium (4)
- Bolivia (1)
- Bosnia and Herzegovina (1)
- Brazil (2)
- Bulgaria (13)
- Canada (12)
- Chile (2)
- China (20)
- Chinese Taipei (2)
- Colombia (2)
- Costa Rica (1)
- Croatia (4)
- Cuba (5)
- Cyprus (2)

- Czechoslovakia (17)
- Denmark (7)
- Ecuador (1)
- Egypt (5)
- Estonia (3)
- Finland (8)
- France (17)
- Germany (18)
- Great Britain (7)
- Greece (3)
- Guatemala (3)
- Hong Kong (1)
- Hungary (18)
- Iceland (1)
- India (2)
- Independent Olympic Participants (8)
- Iraq (1)
- Israel (3)
- Italy (13)
- Japan (11)
- Jordan (1)

- Kenya (2)
- Kuwait (2)
- Latvia (2)
- Liechtenstein (1)
- Luxembourg (3)
- Malaysia (1)
- Malta (1)
- Mexico (1)
- Monaco (1)
- Mongolia (2)
- Nepal (1)
- Netherlands (4)
- Netherlands Antilles (1)
- New Zealand (3)
- Nicaragua (1)
- North Korea (9)
- Norway (7)
- Oman (1)
- Peru (2)
- Philippines (2)
- Poland (12)

- Portugal (4)
- Puerto Rico (2)
- Romania (5)
- San Marino (2)
- Singapore (1)
- Slovenia (1)
- South Africa (2)
- South Korea (12)
- Spain (15)
- Sri Lanka (1)
- Sweden (7)
- Switzerland (8)
- Syria (1)
- Thailand (2)
- Turkey (1)
- Unified Team (22)
- United States (21)
- Virgin Islands (1)
- Uruguay (1)
- Vietnam (1)
