= David Moore (sport shooter) =

Australian sports shooter

Personal information
- Full name: David Keith Moore
- Nationality: Australia
- Born: 30 December 1953 (age 72) Sydney, Australia
- Height: 1.83 m (6 ft 0 in)
- Weight: 125 kg (276 lb)

Sport
- Sport: Shooting
- Events: 10 m air pistol (AP60); 25 m centre fire pistol (CFP); 25 m standard pistol (STP); 50 m pistol (FP)
- Club: Sydney Pistol Club
- Coached by: Cheryl Moore
Medal record
Men's shooting
Representing Australia
Commonwealth Games
Gold medal – first place	2006 Melbourne	FP (pairs)
Gold medal – first place	1998 Kuala Lumpur	FP (pairs)
Silver medal – second place	2002 Manchester	CFP (pairs)
Silver medal – second place	2002 Manchester	FP (pairs)
Silver medal – second place	2006 Melbourne	STP (pairs)

David Keith Moore (born 30 December 1953 in Sydney) is an Australian sport shooter. Since 1995, Moore had won a total of twelve medals (four golds, four silver, and four bronze) in the air, standard, centre-fire, and free pistol at the Oceania Shooting Championships. He also captured a gold medal in the free pistol pairs, along with his partner Daniel Repacholi, at the 2006 Commonwealth Games in Melbourne, with a combined score of 1,086 points. Moore competed for both air and free pistol shooting events at the 2000 Summer Olympics in Sydney, and at the 2004 Summer Olympics in Athens, but he neither reached the final round, nor claimed an Olympic medal.

Eight years after competing in his first Olympics, Moore qualified for his third Australian team, as a 54-year-old, at the 2008 Summer Olympics in Beijing, by placing second in the men's free pistol from the 2007 Oceania Shooting Championships, coincidentally in his home city Sydney. He scored a total of 571 targets in the preliminary rounds of the men's 10 m air pistol, by one point ahead of Trinidad and Tobago's Roger Daniel from the final attempt, finishing only in thirty-sixth place. Three days later, Moore placed thirty-fifth in his second event, 50 m pistol, by one point behind French sport shooter and five-time Olympian Franck Dumoulin, with a total score of 546 targets.

== Olympic results ==
Event	2000	2004	2008
50-metre pistol	15th 556	24th 550	34th 546
10 metre air pistol	32nd 567	27th 574	35th 571
