= Vladimir Gontcharov =

Russian sport shooter (born 1977)

Personal information
- Full name: Vladimir Aleksandrovich; Goncharov
- Nationality: Russia
- Born: 21 May 1977 (age 49) Sosnovy Bor, Russian SFSR, Soviet Union
- Height: 1.67 m (5 ft 5 1/2 in)
- Weight: 59 kg (130 lb)

Sport
- Sport: Shooting
- Event(s): 10 m air pistol (AP60); 50 m pistol (FP)
- Club: Dynamo St. Petersburg
- Coached by: Anatoliy Suslov
Medal record
Men's shooting
Representing Russia
World Championships
Bronze medal – third place	2002 Lahti	FP
Bronze medal – third place	2006 Zagreb	AP60
Bronze medal – third place	2014 Granada	AP60
European Games
Bronze medal – third place	2015 Baku	Mixed 10 m air pistol
European Championships
Gold medal – first place	2017 Maribor	Pistol team
Silver medal – second place	2017 Maribor	Pistol mixed team

Vladimir Gontcharov

Military service
- Allegiance: Russia
- Branch/service: Russian Armed Forces
- Years of service: 2022 - now
- Battles/wars: Russo-Ukrainian War; Russian invasion of Ukraine

Vladimir Aleksandrovich Goncharov (also Vladimir Gontcharov, Russian: Владимир Александрович Гончаров; born 21 May 1977) is a Russian sport shooter. He collected a total of three bronze medals in pistol shooting at the ISSF World Shooting Championships (2002, 2006, and 2014), and was also selected to represent Russia at the 2000 Summer Olympics in Sydney, finishing ninth in the air pistol and fourth in the free pistol. Gontcharov is also a member of the shooting team for Dynamo St. Petersburg, under head coach Anatoliy Suslov.

Gontcharov qualified for the Russian squad in pistol shooting at the 2000 Summer Olympics in Sydney after shooting a mandatory minimum score of 590 in air pistol at the 1999 ISSF World Cup meet in the same Olympic venue. In the men's air pistol, Gontcharov scored 572 points to share the ninth position with neighboring Uzbekistan's Dilshod Mukhtarov in the prelims, nearly missing out the final round by a two-point deficit. Gontcharov gave himself a chance to improve his feat in the men's free pistol by occupying one of the top eight slots for the final round, but eventually fired a disastrous 7.3-point shot in the ninth series that dropped him out of the medal podium to fourth with a final score of 662.5, finishing just behind the bronze medalist Martin Tenk of the Czech Republic by a 0.3-point margin.

At the 2014 ISSF World Shooting Championships in Granada, Spain, Gontcharov edged out China's Pu Qifeng by a tremendous 1.1-point advantage to claim his third career bronze medal (the first one being done in 2002 and the other in 2006) in the men's air pistol with 178.9 points. Despite missing out his chance to try for three consecutive Olympic bids since 2000, Gontcharov's third-place finish at the World Championships had guaranteed him an Olympic slot for the Russian team at the 2016 Summer Olympics, signifying his possible comeback from a sixteen-year absence.
