= Vigilio Fait =

Italian sport shooter (born 1962)

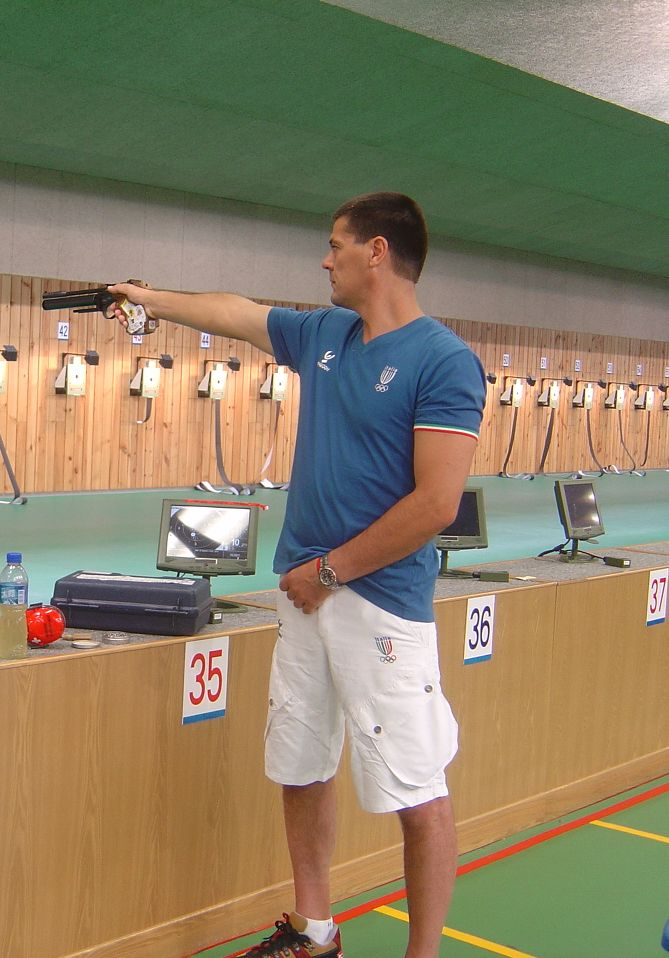
- Fait in 2008

Personal information
- Nationality: Italy
- Born: 14 October 1962 (age 63) Rovereto, Trentino, Italy
- Height: 1.82 m (5 ft 11 1/2 in)
- Weight: 84 kg (185 lb)

Sport
- Sport: Shooting
- Event(s): 10 m air pistol (AP60); 50 m pistol (FP)
- Club: TSN Rovereto
- Coached by: Giancarlo Tosi
Medal record
Men's shooting
Representing Italy
World Championships
Silver medal – second place	2006 Zagreb	FP

Vigilio Fait (born 14 October 1962 in Rovereto, Trentino) is an Italian sport shooter. Since 1997, Fait had won a total of ten medals (three golds, four silver, and three bronze) for both air and free pistol at the ISSF World Cup series. He also captured a silver medal in the men's 50 m pistol at the 2006 ISSF World Shooting Championships in Zagreb, Croatia, accumulating a score of 662.8 points. Fait is a four-time Olympian, and a member of Revereto National Shooting Club (Italian: Tiro a Segno Nazionale Rovereto) under his coach Giancarlo Tosi.

Fait made his official debut for the 1996 Summer Olympics in Atlanta, Georgia, representing his nation Italy. He achieved a fifth-place finish in the 50 m pistol, and a seventeenth-place finish in the 10 m air pistol, accumulating scores of 659.8 and 578 points, respectively. Fait also competed at the 2000 Summer Olympics in Sydney, and at the 2004 Summer Olympics in Athens, but he neither reached the final round, nor claimed an Olympic medal.

Twelve years after competing in his first Olympics, Fait qualified for his fourth Italian team, as a 46-year-old, at the 2008 Summer Olympics in Beijing by placing second in men's free pistol from the World Championships. He scored a total of 580 targets in the preliminary rounds of the men's 10 m air pistol, by one point ahead of Bulgarian shooter and two-time Olympic champion Tanyu Kiryakov from the final attempt, finishing only in ninth place. Three days later, Fait placed twenty-eighth in his second event, 50 m pistol, by one point behind North Korea's Ryu Myong-Yon from the final attempt, with a total score of 551 targets.

== Olympic results ==
Event	1996	2000	2004	2008
50 metre pistol	5th 569+90.8	20th 553	12th 556	27th 551
10 metre air pistol	17th 578	27th 571	23rd 576	9th 580
