= Alexander Danilov =

Israeli sport shooter

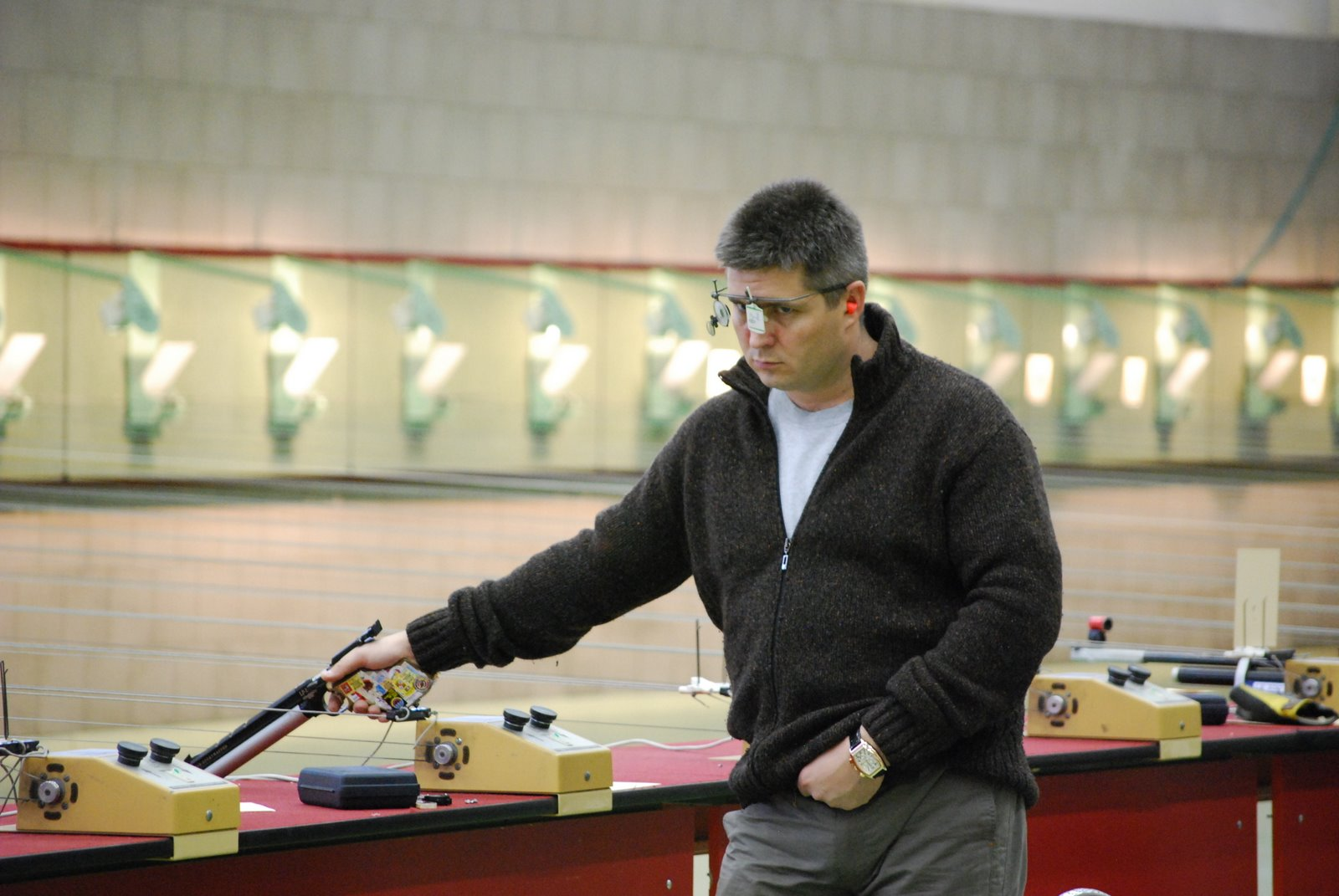
Danilov in 2008

Alexander Danilov (Hebrew: אלכסנדר דנילוב, Russian: Александр Данилов; born November 10, 1969) is an Israeli pistol shooter competed for his country at the 2000 Sydney Games and 2004 Athens Games.

== Athletic career ==
Danilov competed in both the free pistol and air pistol shooting events. He won silver at the 1995 European Championships in the 50-meter free pistol event. Competing for Russia, he was fifth at the World Cup in Munich in 1997. He won the gold medal in the 10-meter pistol event at the 1999 European Championships, and in air pistol in 2000.

He was disqualified and placed last in the 10-meter pistol event at the 2000 Olympic Games when his trigger was found to be underweight. He scored 574 points, which would not have been enough to reach the finals. In the 50-meter free pistol event he scored 556 points and placed 18th.

He finished third at the 2001 Atlanta World Cup and placed fourth in free pistol, and placed second in air pistol at a World Cup event in Finland the following year. He placed 10th overall at the 2003 European Championships and third at a World Cup event in Bangkok in 2004. Also that year, he won a Grand-Prix meet with 668.7 points, setting a new Israeli record. At the 2004 Olympics, Danilove placed 15th in the 50 meter free pistol and 20th in the 10 meter air pistol event.

Danilov's wife, Olga Danilova, is a short track speed skater who competed for Israel at the 2002 Winter Olympics.

Olympic results
Event	1996	2000	2004
50 metre pistol	16th 558	18th 556	15th 554
10 metre air pistol	—	DQ	20th 577
