= Cammaerts =

Cammaerts is a surname. Notable people with the surname include:

- Edwig Cammaerts (born 1987), Belgian cyclist
- Émile Cammaerts (1878–1953), Belgian playwright, poet, and author
- Francis Cammaerts (1916–2006), British special agent, son of Émile
- Philippe Cammaerts (born 1894), Belgian sports shooter
