= Stachurski =

Stachurski (feminine: Stachurska, plural: Stachurscy) is a Polish surname. Notable people with the surname include:

- Rajmund Stachurski (1935–2004), Polish sport shooter
- Witold Stachurski (1947–2001), Polish boxer
- Władysław Stachurski (1945–2013), Polish footballer and manager
