= Mikhail Nestruyev =

Russian sports shooter

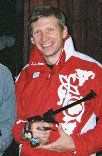

Personal information
- Born: 28 October 1968 (age 57) Moscow, Russian SFSR, Soviet Union
Medal record
Representing Russia
Men's shooting
Olympic Games
Gold medal – first place	2004 Athens	50 m pistol
Silver medal – second place	2004 Athens	10 m air pistol
ISSF World Shooting Championships
Gold medal – first place	2002 Lahti	10m air pistol
Gold medal – first place	1998 Barcelona	STP
Silver medal – second place	2006 Zagreb	center fire pistol
Silver medal – second place	2002 Lahti	center fire pistol
ISSF World Cup Final
Gold medal – first place	2005 Munich	10m air pistol
Gold medal – first place	2004 Bangkok	10m air pistol
Gold medal – first place	2003 Milan	10m air pistol
Gold medal – first place	2002 Munich	10m air pistol
Gold medal – first place	2001 Munich	free pistol
Silver medal – second place	2002 Munich	free pistol
ISSF World Cup
Gold medal – first place	2007 Munich	10m air pistol
Gold medal – first place	2006 Resebde	free pistol
Gold medal – first place	2004 Athens	free pistol
Gold medal – first place	2004 Bangkok	10m air pistol
Gold medal – first place	2004 Milan	10m air pistol
Gold medal – first place	2003 Fort Benning	10m air pistol
Gold medal – first place	2001 Munich	free pistol
Gold medal – first place	2001 Seoul	free pistol
European Championships
Gold medal – first place	2013 Osijek	25 m SP team
Gold medal – first place	2007 Granada	center fire pistol
Gold medal – first place	2005 Belgrade	center fire pistol
Gold medal – first place	2004 Győr	10 m air pistol
Gold medal – first place	2003 Gothenburg	10 m air pistol
Gold medal – first place	2003 Plzen	STP
Gold medal – first place	2002 Thessaloniki	10 m air pistol
Gold medal – first place	2001 Zagreb	free pistol
Gold medal – first place	2001 Zagreb	STP
Gold medal – first place	1999 Bordeaux	STP
Gold medal – first place	1997 Warsaw	10 m air pistol
Gold medal – first place	1997 Kouvola	center fire pistol
Gold medal – first place	1997 Kouvola	STP

Mikhail Valeryevich Nestruyev (Russian: Михаил Валерьевич Неструев, born 28 October 1968 in Moscow) is a pistol shooter from Moscow, Russia. He is an all-round shooter, having achieved great successes in all five ISSF pistol events. He holds the 25 metre center-fire pistol world record of 594. He also shares the European record in 25 metre standard pistol with Ragnar Skanåker and Vladas Turla, and has performed over 580 at several occasions.

Nestruyev has also excelled in the Olympic events. In the 2004 Olympics after setting a new Olympic record in qualification he lost a close final to Wang Yifu in 10 metre air pistol, but a few days later took the gold in the 50 metre pistol event. He also won the ISSF World Shooting Championships in 1998 (25 metre standard pistol) and 2002 (10 metre air pistol), and has many other medals from World and European Championships in all four events, and has won four consecutive ISSF World Cup Finals in Air Pistol (2002-2005).

Starting late as a 25 metre rapid fire pistol shooter, Nestruyev qualified for the Russian team at the 2009 European Championships, where he won the silver medal.

Holding the rank of lieutenant colonel, Nestruyev has also competed successfully for several years in international military competitions.

== Olympic results ==
Event	2000	2004	2008
50 metre pistol	—	(gold) Gold; 565+98.3	23rd 552
10 metre air pistol	4th 583+99.3	(silver) Silver; 591+98.8	28th 575

== Records ==
Current world records held in 25 metre center-fire pistol
Men (ISSF)	Individual	596	Christian Reitz (GER)	31 July 2015	Maribor (SLO)
Current world records held in 10 metre air pistol
Men	Teams	1759	Russia (Isakov, Nestruyev, Yekimov); China (Wang, Pang, Mai)	March 16, 2007; March 9, 2014	Deauville (FRA); Kuwait City (KUW)

== Gallery ==
Nestruyev - the winner of World Cup'07 in Munich
