= Norbelis Bárzaga =

Cuban sports shooter (born 1975)

Personal information
- Full name: Norbelis Bárzaga Vázquez
- Nationality: Cuba
- Born: 21 February 1975 (age 51) Jiguaní, Cuba
- Height: 1.77 m (5 ft 9 1/2 in)
- Weight: 75 kg (165 lb)

Sport
- Sport: Shooting
- Event(s): 10 m air pistol (AP60); 50 m pistol (FP)
- Club: Ciudad de Granma
- Coached by: Narciso López
Medal record
Men's shooting
Representing Cuba
Pan American Games
| Gold medal – first place | 1995 Mar del Plata | AP60 |
| Bronze medal – third place | 1999 Winnipeg | FP |
| Bronze medal – third place | 2003 Santo Domingo | FP |

Norbelis Bárzaga Vázquez (born February 21, 1975, in Jiguaní) is a Cuban sport shooter. He had won a total of three medals (one gold and two bronze) in pistol shooting at the Pan American Games, and was selected to represent Cuba in two editions of the Olympic Games (2000 and 2004). Throughout his sporting career, Barzaga trained as a member of the shooting team for Granma City Sport Club under his personal coach Narciso López.

Barzaga's Olympic debut came at the 2000 Summer Olympics in Sydney, where he placed thirtieth in the free pistol and thirty-third in the air pistol, accumulating total scores of 547 and 566 respectively.

At the 2004 Summer Olympics in Athens, Barzaga qualified for his second Cuban team in pistol shooting. Earlier in the process, he picked up his third career medal (the first being done in 1995 and the other in 1999) with a bronze in free pistol at the 2003 Pan American Games in Santo Domingo, Dominican Republic to grab one of the Olympic slots for his nation, accumulating a total score of 638.9 and a mandatory Olympic standard of 545 from the prelims. Barzaga fired 573 points to obtain the thirtieth spot in the men's 10 m air pistol, and then edged out his compatriot Arseny Borrero by a seven-point mark to share a thirty-fourth-place finish and a score of 542 with Spain's José Antonio Colado in the men's 50 m pistol, falling short of his chance to advance into the final for both events.
