= Denev =

Denev (Bulgarian: Денев) is a Bulgarian masculine surname, its feminine counterpart is Deneva. Notable people with the surname include:

- Dencho Denev (born 1936), Bulgarian sports shooter
- Georgi Denev (born 1950), Bulgarian football player and manager
