= David Porter (sport shooter) =

Australian sports shooter

David Porter (born 3 October 1953 in Balaklava, South Australia) is an Australian sport shooter. He competed at the 2000 Summer Olympics in the men's 50 metre pistol event, in which he tied for 20th place, and the men's 10 metre air pistol event, in which he placed 38th.
