= Wang Yifu =

Chinese sport shooter (born 1960)

Personal information
- Native name: 王义夫
- Born: 4 December 1960 (age 65) Liaoyang, Liaoning, People’s Republic of China
Medal record
Men's shooting
Representing China
Olympic Games
Gold medal – first place	1992 Barcelona	10 m air pistol
Gold medal – first place	2004 Athens	10 m air pistol
Silver medal – second place	1992 Barcelona	50 m pistol
Silver medal – second place	1996 Atlanta	10 m air pistol
Silver medal – second place	2000 Sydney	10 m air pistol
Bronze medal – third place	1984 Los Angeles	50 m pistol

Wang Yifu (Chinese: 王义夫; pinyin: Wáng Yìfū, born 4 December 1960) is a male Chinese pistol shooter, and in terms of Olympic medals one of the most successful sport shooters of all times, and was the first shooter with six individual Olympic medals. He specializes in the 50 m Pistol and 10 m Air Pistol events. He is the only shooter to have won two gold medals in men's 10 metre air pistol.

== Life and career ==
Wang was born on 4 December 1960 in Liaoyang, Liaoning. Wang won his first Olympic medal in the Los Angeles games at the age of 23. After this, the Air Pistol event was added to the program, and this is where he has achieved his greatest accomplishments. He won the 1992 gold medal only days after a new medal in the 50 m event. His three attempts to repeat the victory have provided impressive results and very tight duels. In 1996, Wang had a two-point pre-final lead over Roberto Di Donna of Italy, and seemed to be the clear winner until in the last shot he got only 6.5 (at a level where anything below 9.0 is considered a very bad shot), and lost the gold medal by the closest possible margin, 0.1 point. Related to this was a collapse due to medical issues coupled with the extreme heat in Atlanta that day.

In 2000, both Wang and Franck Dumoulin (France) scored 590 points and tied for a new Olympic record. Wang lost by two points in the final. In the 2004 competition, Wang scored 590 once more but lost the Olympic record to Mikhail Nestruev (Russia) who achieved 591; however, the Chinese managed to erase the small gap and eventually won by a margin of 0.2 points to get his second Olympic gold. Also in the ISSF World Shooting Championships, Wang won both 50 m Pistol (in 1994) and 10 m Air Pistol (in 1998). Wang is married to sport shooter Zhang Qiuping.

== See also ==
- List of multiple Summer Olympic medalists
