= Torsten Ullman =

Swedish sports shooter (1908–1993)

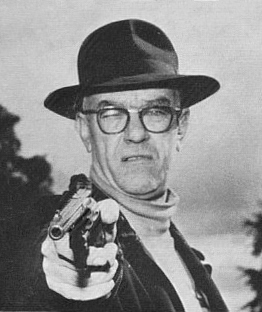
- Torsten Ullman

Personal information
- Nationality: Swedish
- Born: 27 July 1908 Stockholm, Sweden
- Died: 11 May 1993 (aged 84) Växjö, Sweden

Sport
- Sport: Sports shooting
- Club: Hjortskyttarna, Stockholm; Växjö PK
Medal record
Representing Sweden
Olympic Games
Gold medal – first place	1936 Berlin	50 m free pistol
Bronze medal – third place	1936 Berlin	25 m rapid-fire pistol
Bronze medal – third place	1948 London	50 m free pistol

Torsten Ullman (27 July 1908 – 11 May 1993) was a Swedish pistol shooter and entrepreneur, most famous for his gold medal in the 1936 Berlin Summer Olympics, where the Germans were favourites in the free pistol competition, but Ullman won by a margin of 15 points. His record score of 559 would still be competitive today in this event. He also won the World Championships in Free Pistol in 1933, 1935, 1937, 1947 and 1952.

Ullman was not a free pistol specialist but rather an all-round shooter, achieving great successes in all three pistol events that existed at the time. In the Rapid Fire competition in Berlin, he won the bronze medal after an extremely rapid shoot-off, and three years later he became World Champion in that event, being one of only four shooters to win major worldwide titles in both 50 m Pistol and 25 m Rapid Fire Pistol. He entered the first World Championship in 25 m Center-Fire Pistol in 1947, surprisingly with a Smith & Wesson revolver, and won by seven points, causing a worldwide revolver hype. He repeated this victory in 1954.

Ullman was one of the first sport shooters to take practice and preparation to a scientific level, which he himself always claimed was a main reason for his success. In 1937, he received the Svenska Dagbladet gold medal for the greatest Swedish sports achievement of the year. He is the only pistol shooter to have received this prestigious award.

Besides his shooting career, Ullman worked with pistol development, and co-authored a widely spread book on shooting with Lev Weinstein. He also started a mechanical industry on Helgö outside Växjö, Småland. It was later moved to Moheda and developed a few filials. Today this industry has been purchased by Finnveden AB.

Ullman was educated from 1925 to 1927 at Sherborne School in Dorset, UK. On leaving Sherborne School he attended Clare College, Cambridge University and then Uppsala University in Sweden. Ullman was married twice, and several of his children have been successful shooters. His youngest daughter Marie-Louise Ullman won the European Junior Championships in 10 m air pistol in 1992.

== Gallery ==
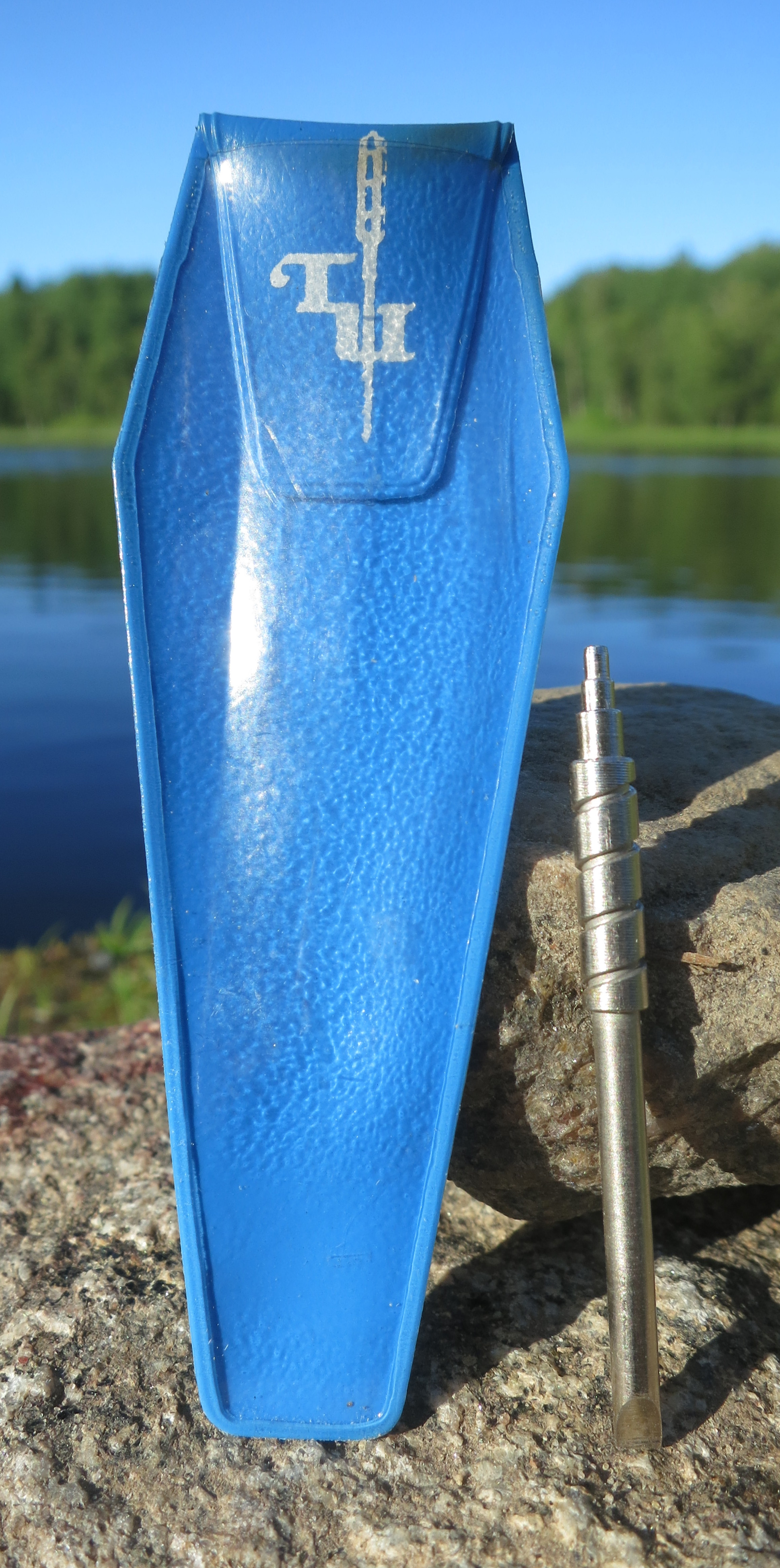
1970s deburring reamer manufactured by Ullman's mechanical industry Ingenjör Torsten Ullman AB

Preceded by Erik August Larsson	Svenska Dagbladet Gold Medal; 1937	Succeeded by Björn Borg
