= Hans-Jürgen Bauer-Neumaier =

German sports shooter

Hans-Jürgen Bauer-Neumaier (born 23 April 1968 in Obertaufkirchen) is a German sport shooter. He competed in pistol shooting events at the Summer Olympics in 1992, 1996, and 2000.

== Olympic results ==
Event	1992	1996	2000
10 metre air pistol (men)	T-12th	T-9th	T-20th
50 metre pistol (men)	T-33rd	T-35th	T-20th
