= Kanstantsin Lukashyk =

Belarusian sports shooter (born 1975)

Personal information
- Full name: Kanstantsin Leаnidаvich Lukashyk
- Born: September 18, 1975 (age 50) Hrodna, Byelorussian SSR, Soviet Union

Sport
- Coached by: Oleg Pishukevich Vladimir Shilov
Medal record
Men's shooting
Representing Unified Team
Olympic Games
Gold medal – first place	1992 Barcelona	50 m pistol
World Championships
Representing Soviet Union
Gold medal – first place	1991 Stavanger	10 m air pistol junior
Representing Belarus
Bronze medal – third place	1998 Barcelona	10 m air pistol
Bronze medal – third place	1998 Barcelona	10 m air pistol team
Bronze medal – third place	1998 Barcelona	25 m center-fire pistol team
Bronze medal – third place	1998 Barcelona	50 m pistol team
World Cup
Silver medal – second place	1998 Buenos Aires	10 m air pistol
Silver medal – second place	2001 Milan	10 m air pistol
Silver medal – second place	2001 Milan	50 m pistol
Bronze medal – third place	1993 Munich	10 m air pistol
Bronze medal – third place	1998 Buenos Aires	50 m pistol
Bronze medal – third place	2004 Athens	10 m air pistol
European Championships
Representing Soviet Union
Gold medal – first place	1991 Manchester	10 m air pistol junior
Gold medal – first place	1991 Bologna	50 m pistol junior
Representing Belarus
Silver medal – second place	1993 Brno	25 m standard pistol team
Silver medal – second place	1997 Kouvola	50 m pistol team
Silver medal – second place	2003 Plzdn	10 m air pistol team
Silver medal – second place	2011 Belgrade	50 m pistol team
Silver medal – second place	2015 Maribor	50 m pistol team
Bronze medal – third place	1993 Brno	10 m air pistol team
Bronze medal – third place	1996 Budapest	10 m air pistol
Bronze medal – third place	1999 Bordeaux	25 m center-fire pistol team
Bronze medal – third place	2005 Belgrade	10 m air pistol team

Kanstantsin Leаnidаvich Lukashyk (Belarusian: Канстанцін Леонідовіч Лукашык, Kanstancin Leаnidаvič Łukašyk, born September 18, 1975, in Hrodna) is a Belarusian pistol shooter, most known for winning the 50 metre pistol event at the 1992 Summer Olympics in Barcelona, at the age of 16. During his last shot, he raised his arm 4 times but kept his nerve and eventually pulled the trigger just seconds before the 75 second time limit ran out. He ended up scoring a 9.9 which was enough to beat a field of 5 other Olympic champions, including Ragnar Skanåker who was 42 years older than Lukashyk. As of 2023, he is the youngest Olympic champion in shooting

The year before Barcelona, Lukashyk became both the World Junior Champion and European Junior Champion in the 10 meter air pistol event. He also won the free pistol event in the latter competition since it was available that year. These triumphs combined with a necessary win at the CIS championships in the free pistol right before Barcelona helped him get a spot on the Olympic team despite his age.

The year after Barcelona, Lukashyk set a junior world record in 10 metre air pistol (lasting until 2006), and has ever since been a regular member of the Belarusian national team, with varying results including some medals at ISSF World Cups.

He has competed at six Olympics so far, from 1992 to 2012.

Olympic results
Event	1992	1996	2000	2004	2008	2012
50 metre pistol	(gold) Gold; 567+91	4th 564+96.1	9th 560	37th 539	10th 558	30th 547
10 metre air pistol	—	9th 580	15th 577	13th 579	26th 575	11th 582
