= Vladimir Isakov (sport shooter) =

Russian sport shooter (born 1970)

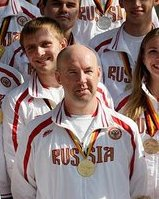

Medal record

Men's shooting

Representing Russia

Olympic Games
Bronze medal – third place	2004 Athens	10 m air pistol
Bronze medal – third place	2008 Beijing	50 m pistol

Vladimir Vyacheslavovich Isakov (Russian: Владимир Вячеславович Исаков; born 28 February 1970 in Pushkino, Moscow Oblast) is a Russian sport shooter.

He has been a member of the Russian national shooting team since 1991. He lives in Pushkino and is married to Irina. They have a son, Maxim, and a daughter, Maria.

In the 2008 Olympic Games in Beijing, he finished fourth in the men's 50 metre pistol event, after winning a seemingly unimportant shoot-off for fourth place against Oleg Omelchuk (9.1 versus 6.5). However, after silver medalist Kim Jong-su was disqualified for propranolol use, this shoot-off gained in relevance, giving Isakov a new Olympic medal.

== Olympic results ==
Event	1996	2000	2004	2008	2012
50 metre pistol	—	—	—	(bronze) Bronze; 563+95.9	10th 559
10 metre air pistol	12th 579	—	(bronze) Bronze; 584+100.3	—	—

== Records ==
Current world records held in 10 metre air pistol
Men	Teams	1759	Russia (Isakov, Nestruyev, Yekimov); China (Wang, Pang, Mai)	March 16, 2007; March 9, 2014	Deauville (FRA); Kuwait City (KUW)
