= Viktor Makarov =

Ukrainian sports shooter (born 1965)

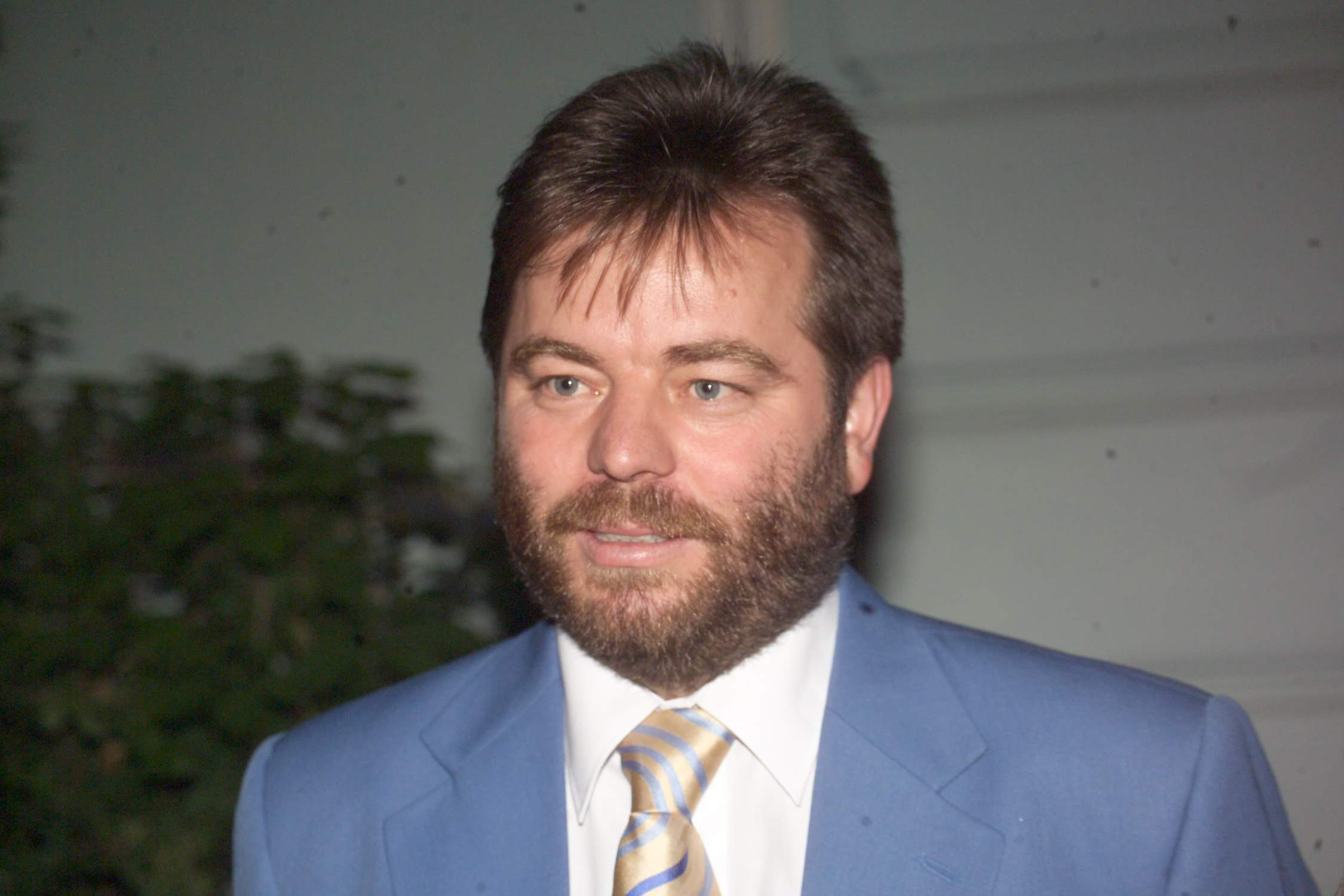

Personal information
- Full name: Viktor Mykhailovych Makarov
- Nationality: Ukraine
- Born: 26 May 1965 (age 61) Oskemen, Kazakh SSR, Soviet Union
- Height: 1.70 m (5 ft 7 in)
- Weight: 72 kg (159 lb)

Sport
- Sport: Shooting
- Events: 10 m air pistol (AP60); 50 m pistol (FP)
- Club: Dynamo Odesa
- Coached by: Dmytro Lukyanov
Medal record
Men's shooting
Representing Ukraine
World Championships
| Silver medal – second place | 1994 Milan | FP |

Viktor Mykhailovych Makarov (Ukrainian: Віктор Михайлович Макаров; born 26 May 1965 in Oskemen, Kazakh SSR) is a Ukrainian sport shooter. He won a silver medal in free pistol shooting at the 1994 ISSF World Championships in Milan, Italy, and was selected to compete for Ukraine in two editions of the Olympic Games (1996 and 2004). Having pursued the sport since the age of fourteen, Makarov trained as a member of the shooting team for Dynamo Odesa, under his personal coach Dmytro Lukyanov. Born in his native Kazakhstan, Makarov also holds a dual citizenship to compete internationally for Ukraine in shooting.

Makarov's Olympic debut came at the 1996 Summer Olympics in Atlanta, where he wound up a twelfth spot in the 10 m air pistol with 579 points, and then shared a twentieth-place tie with four other shooters, all hailed from Eastern Europe, in the free pistol, shooting a dismal prelim score of 557.

After missing out his 2000 Olympic bid, Makarov returned from an eight-year absence to qualify for his second Ukrainian team, as a 39-year-old, in pistol shooting at the 2004 Summer Olympics in Athens. A year before the Games, he set a minimum qualifying score of 557 and then picked up a silver medal in free pistol with a total of 650.9 to grab one of the available Olympic slots for his nation at the initial meet of the ISSF World Cup series in Fort Benning, Georgia, United States. In the men's 10 m air pistol, held on the first day of the Games, Makarov shot a score of 578 to finish in a three-way tie for seventeenth place with Portugal's João Costa and Italy's Francesco Bruno. Three days later, Makarov improved from his disappointing feat in the air pistol to fire 557 points for a remarkable tenth-place finish in the men's 50 m pistol, but his shots were not highly enough to put him through the final round, missing out by a two-point shortfall.
