= Vladimir Isakov =

Vladimir Isakov may refer to:

- Vladimir Isakov (sport shooter) (born 1970), Russian sport shooter
- Vladimir Isakov (general) (born 1950), Russian general
- Vladimir Isakov (politician) (born 1987), Russian politician
- Vladimir Isakov (footballer) (born 1979), Russian footballer
