= Irving Calkins =

American sport shooter (1875–1958)

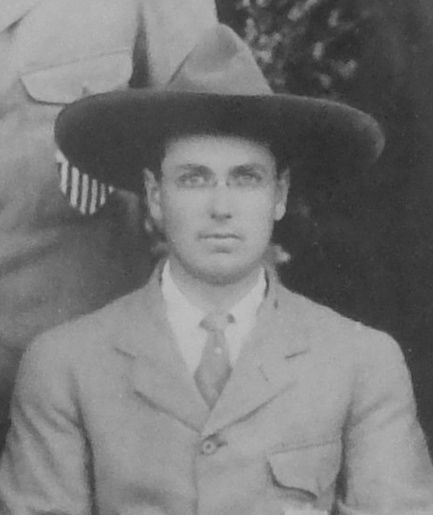

Personal information
- Born: Irving Romaro Calkins; October 31, 1875 Palmer, Massachusetts, U.S.
- Died: August 26, 1958 (aged 82) Springfield, Massachusetts, U.S.

Sport
- Sport: Sports shooting
Medal record
Men's shooting
Representing United States
Olympic Games
Gold medal – first place	1908 London	Team pistol

Irving Romaro Calkins (October 31, 1875 – August 26, 1958) was an American physician and sport shooter who competed at the 1908 Summer Olympics.

== Biography ==
Irving Calkins was born in Palmer, Massachusetts on October 31, 1875.

He studied at Harvard, the University of Pennsylvania, the University of Vermont, and earned a medical degree from Baltimore Medical College in 1896.

At the 1908 Olympics, he won a gold medal in the team pistol event. He finished in eighth place in the individual pistol event. He became world champion in 1923.

He died in Springfield, Massachusetts on August 26, 1958.
