= Charles des Jamonières =

French sport shooter

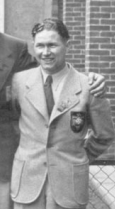

Personal information
- Full name: Charles André Juchault des Jamonières
- Born: 18 April 1902 Cellier, France
- Died: 16 August 1970 (aged 68) Saint-Herblain, France

Sport
- Sport: Sports shooting
Medal record
Men's shooting
Representing France
Olympic Games
Bronze medal – third place	1936 Berlin	50 metre pistol

Charles des Jamonières (18 April 1902 – 16 August 1970) was a French sport shooter who competed in the 1936 Summer Olympics, in the 1948 Summer Olympics, and in the 1956 Summer Olympics.

In 1936 he won the bronze medal in the 50 metre pistol event. He also participated in the 25 metre rapid fire pistol competition but was eliminated in the first round.
