= Marcel Bonin (sport shooter) =

French sports shooter

Personal information
- Born: 10 November 1904 Tours, France
- Died: 17 September 1980 (aged 75) Tours, France

Sport
- Sport: Sports shooting

Marcel Bonin (10 November 1904 – 17 September 1980) was a French sports shooter. He competed at the 1936 Summer Olympics and 1948 Summer Olympics.
