= Jean Carrère =

French rugby union player (1930–2022)

Jean Carrère (5 April 1930 – 27 May 2022) was a French rugby union player who played for Paris Université Club, Racing Club Vichy, RC Toulonnais, USA Perpignan, Étoile sportive catalane and the national team.
