= Emil Martin =

German sports shooter

Personal information
- Born: 27 November 1894

Sport
- Sport: Sports shooting

Emil Martin (born 27 November 1894, date of death unknown) was a German sports shooter. He competed in the 50 m pistol event at the 1936 Summer Olympics.
