= Tanyu Kiryakov =

Bulgarian sport shooter (born 1963)

Personal information
- Born: 2 March 1963 (age 63)
Medal record
Men's shooting
Representing Bulgaria
Olympic Games
Gold medal – first place	1988 Seoul	10 m air pistol
Gold medal – first place	2000 Sydney	50 m pistol
Bronze medal – third place	1996 Atlanta	10 m air pistol

Tanyu Kiryakov (Bulgarian: Таню Киряков; born 2 March 1963) is a Bulgarian pistol shooter. He became the first shooter to have won Olympic gold medals in both the 50 metre pistol event (2000 Sydney Olympics) and the 10 metre air pistol event (1988 Seoul Olympics), in which he was also the first Olympic champion. He is also the only Bulgarian to have won two gold medals at the Summer Olympics. He is considered to be one of the all-time best and his versatile skills and continued excellence have won him numerous fans. He was born in Ruse in northeastern Bulgaria.

Olympic results
Event	1988	1992	1996	2000	2004	2008
50 metre pistol	4th 566+90	8th 567+51 DNF	20th 556	(gold) Gold; 570+96.0	7th 562+92.3	6th 562+94.8
10 metre air pistol	(gold) Gold; 585+102.9	7th 583+96.7	(bronze) Bronze; 584+99.8	8th 581+95.8	4th 583+100.4	9th 580
