= Paul Wehner =

German sports shooter (1896–1982)

Personal information
- Born: 7 September 1896
- Died: 1 June 1982 (aged 85) Düsseldorf, West Germany

Sport
- Sport: Sports shooting

Paul Wehner (7 September 1896 – 1 June 1982) was a German sports shooter. He competed at the 1936 Summer Olympics and 1952 Summer Olympics. Between 1951 and 1956, he was President of the Deutscher Schützenbund.
