= Sture Nordlund =

Swedish sports shooter

Personal information
- Born: 22 November 1919 Nordingrå, Sweden
- Died: 14 December 1973 (aged 54) Saltsjöbaden, Sweden

Sport
- Sport: Sports shooting

Sture Nordlund (22 November 1919 – 14 December 1973) was a Swedish sports shooter. He competed in the 50 m pistol event at the 1948 Summer Olympics.
