= Ivan Némethy =

Slovak sports shooter

Personal information
- Nationality: Slovak
- Born: 10 November 1946 (age 78); Martin, Czechoslovakia

Sport
- Sport: Sports shooting

Ivan Némethy (born 10 November 1946) is a Slovak sports shooter. He competed at the 1976 Summer Olympics and the 1980 Summer Olympics.
