= Giancarlo Boriani =

Italian sports shooter (1894–1982)

Personal information
- Born: 14 December 1894 Bologna, Italy
- Died: 26 January 1982 (aged 87) Bologna, Italy

Sport
- Sport: Sports shooting

Giancarlo Girolamo Giuseppe Boriani (14 December 1894 – 26 January 1982) was an Italian sports shooter. He competed at the 1920 Summer Olympics and 1936 Summer Olympics.
