= Federico Grüben =

Argentine sports shooter

Personal information
- Born: 1899 Córdoba, Argentina
- Died: 1978 (aged 78–79) Río Cuarto, Córdoba, Argentina

Sport
- Sport: Sports shooting

Federico Grüben (1899–1978) was an Argentine Olympic shooter. He competed in the 50 m pistol event at the 1948 Summer Olympics.
