= Alexander Specker =

Swiss sports shooter (born 1918)

Personal information
- Born: 30 June 1918
- Died: before 2007

Sport
- Sport: Sports shooting

Alexander Specker (born 30 June 1918, date of death unknown) was a Swiss sports shooter. He competed in the 50 m pistol event at the 1952 Summer Olympics. Specker is deceased sometimes before 2007.
