= Hämmerli =

German small arms manufacturer

- Type: Subsidiary
- Industry: Small arms manufacturing
- Founded: 1863; 163 years ago
- Founder: Johann Ulrich Hämmerli
- Headquarters: Germany
- Products: Competition air guns and firearms
- Parent: Carl Walther GmbH Sportwaffen
- Website: Hämmerli Official Site

Hämmerli (German pronunciation: [ˈhɛmɐli]) is a formerly Swiss, now German manufacturer of air guns and firearms aimed mostly at target shooting, especially Olympic events governed by the International Shooting Sport Federation. In 2006, Hämmerli was acquired by Umarex; production and customer support moved to Ulm, Germany.

== History ==
The Hämmerli brand dates back to 1863 when Johann Ulrich Hämmerli founded the company to make rifle barrels for the Swiss Army. Since then, Hämmerli has manufactured rifle barrels, firearms, and firearm components. In 1950, Hämmerli produced Olympic rifles that were used to win gold medals at the next four Olympics. In 2000, SIG's weapons division was sold to Lüke- und Ortmeier-Holding, and in the same year Hämmerli was re-established as an independent company. The new Hämmerli AG then moved from Zug to the production site in Lenzburg in 2001 and was relocated to Neuhausen am Rheinfall (canton of Schaffhausen) in 2003.

== Pistols ==
=== Standard and centre-fire pistols ===
These pistols are used in 25 m Standard Pistol, 25 m Center-Fire Pistol (center-fire pistol) and 25 m Pistol (sport pistol) events.

- 208, 208s (discontinued), .22 LR
- 212 (discontinued), .22 LR, ″Jägerschaftspistole″, later modification of the 208
- 215 (discontinued), .22 LR, less luxurious version of 208
- 230 Rapid Fire (discontinued), .22 S, front-of-chamber gas escape
- 280 (discontinued), .22 LR or .32 S&W Long (Wadcutter)
- SP20 (discontinued), .22 LR or .32 S&W Long
- SP20 RRS, .22 LR or .32 S&W Long
- Trailside, .22 LR, Formerly the SIG/Hämmerli Trailside and now the Hämmerli/X-Esse
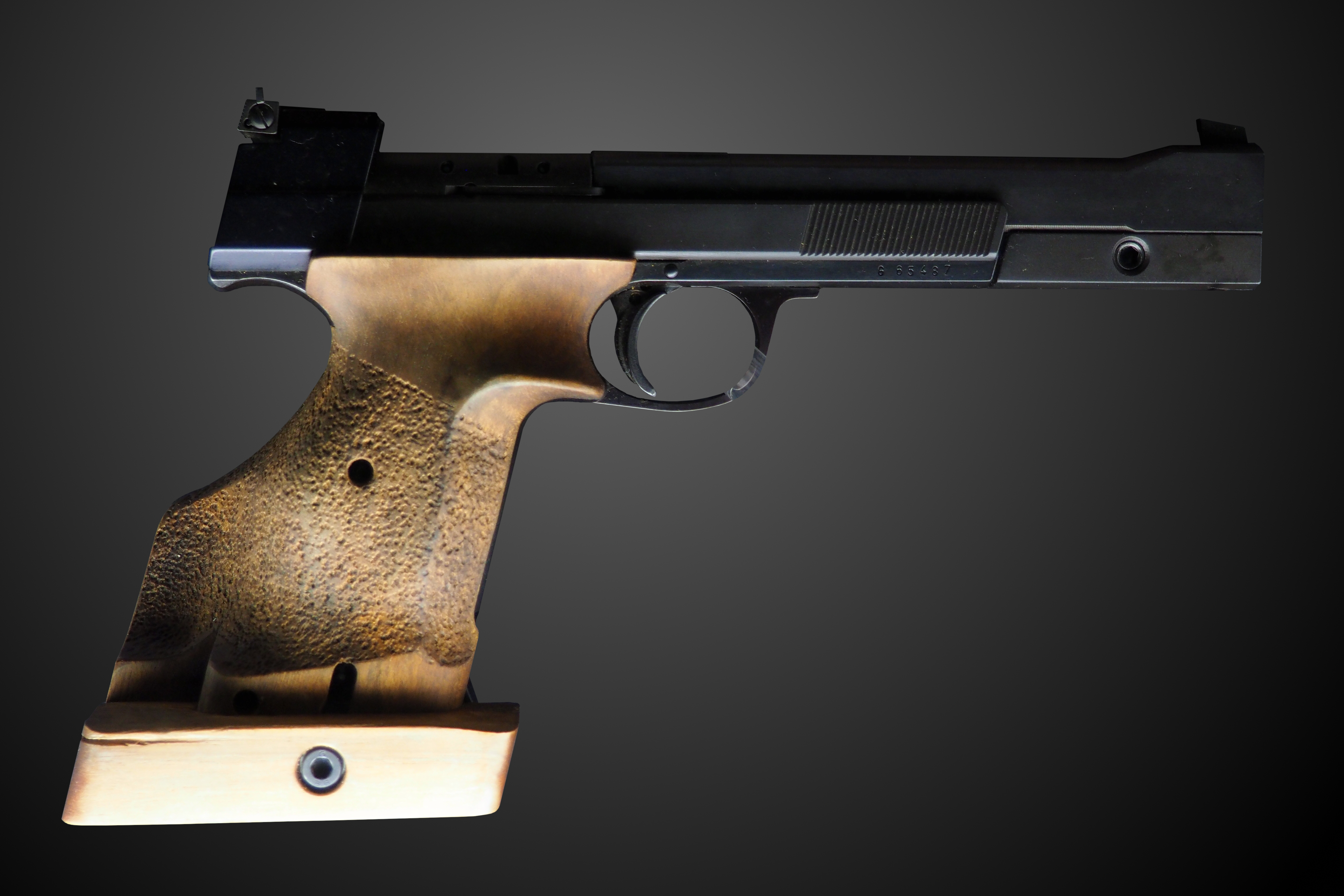
Hämmerli model 215

=== Free Pistol ===
Used to compete in the 50 m Pistol event for single-shot .22 LR

- MP 33 (discontinued) Developed in 1933 with a Martini type action. Production halted during WWII, and ended with the sale of the company, and introduction of the Model 100 (c. 1950).
- Model 100 (discontinued) Later to include the 101 through 106 iterations; featuring octagonal or round barrels, blue or matte finished metalwork, etc. Inspiration for the Soviet TOZ 35 free pistol design.
- 120 (discontinued) Introduced as a simpler, lower cost option using a side-lever action.
- 150/152 (discontinued) Released in 1973 as a modern design, it led the move away from earlier under-lever actions to top-levers, later used in Morini and models from other brands. The 150 was a manual trigger design, while the 152 featured an electronic trigger mechanism.
- 160/162 (discontinued) A further update of the 150/152 series, the use of composite materials and computerized machining were evident. The 160 was a manual trigger design, while the 162 featured an electronic trigger mechanism.
- FP10, (discontinued)
- FP60, (discontinued, now manufactured by Walther)

=== Air pistol ===
Used to compete in .177 caliber 10 m Air Pistol events.

- Hämmerli 480 series (480, 480k and 480k2), pre-charged-pneumatic (PCP) air pistol.
- AP60, pre-charged-pneumatic (PCP) air pistol.

== Rifles ==
=== 300 m rifle ===
- S 205, used in 300 m Rifle events and jointly developed with Sauer & Sohn

=== 0.22 long rifle ===
- TAC R1 22C .22 caliber tactical rimfire rifle

=== Air rifle ===
- AR20, .177 caliber pre-charged-pneumatic (PCP) air rifle used to compete in 10 m air rifle events.
