= Norbert Van Molle =

Belgian sports shooter

Personal information
- Born: 15 June 1885 Saint-Gilles, Belgium
- Died: December 1969 (aged 84)

Sport
- Sport: Sports shooting

Norbert Paul Emile Van Molle (15 June 1885 – December 1969) was a Belgian sports shooter. He competed in three events at the 1920 Summer Olympics.
