= Ernst Stoll =

Swiss sports shooter

Personal information
- Born: 4 June 1927 Zurich, Switzerland
- Died: 22 September 2017 (aged 90)

Sport
- Sport: Sports shooting

Ernst Stoll (4 June 1927 – 22 September 2017) was a Swiss sports shooter. He competed at the 1964 Summer Olympics and the 1968 Summer Olympics.
