= Stefano Margotti =

Italian sports shooter

Personal information
- Born: 7 March 1900 Turin, Italy
- Died: 19 May 1981 (aged 81) Turin

Sport
- Sport: Sports shooting

Stefano Margotti (7 March 1900 – 19 May 1981) was an Italian sports shooter. He competed at the 1936 Summer Olympics and 1948 Summer Olympics.
