= Serruys =

Serruys is a surname. Notable people with the surname include:

- Paul Serruys (1912–1999), Belgian missionary, sinologist, and academic
- Yvonne Serruys (1873–1953), Franco-Belgian artist
