= Boris Kokorev =

Russian sport shooter (1959–2018)

- Kokorev in 2007

Personal information
- Born: 20 April 1959 Tbilisi, Georgian SSR, Soviet Union
- Died: 22 October 2018 (aged 59) Moscow, Russia
Medal record
Men's shooting
Representing Russia
Olympic Games
Gold medal – first place	1996 Atlanta	50 m pistol

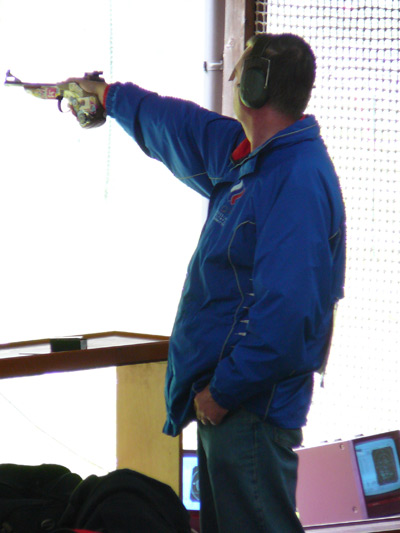
Boris Kokorev in the 50 m Pistol, World Cup'07 in Munich

Boris Borisovich Kokorev (Russian: Борис Борисович Кокорев; 20 April 1959 – 22 October 2018) was a Russian competitive pistol shooter who won a gold medal in the Men's 50 Metre event at the 1996 Summer Olympics in Atlanta.

Olympic results
Event	1988	1992	1996	2000	2004
50 metre pistol	—	—	(gold) Gold; 570+96.4	12th 559	5th 560+94.6
10 metre air pistol	8th 581+96.3	22nd 575	—	—	—
