= Ihar Basinski =

Belarusian sports shooter (born 1963)

Ihar Basinski Igor Basinsky
Personal information
- Born: April 11, 1963 (age 63) Hrodna, Byelorussian SSR, Soviet Union
Medal record
Men's shooting
Olympic Games
Representing Soviet Union
Bronze medal – third place	1988 Seoul	50 m pistol
Representing Belarus
Silver medal – second place	1996 Atlanta	50 m pistol
Silver medal – second place	2000 Sydney	50 m pistol
Bronze medal – third place	2000 Sydney	10 m air pistol

Ihar Basinski (born April 11, 1963), also spelled Igor Basinsky, is a Belarusian sports shooter and Olympic medalist. He was born in Hrodna and won silver medals in the 50 metre pistol at the 1996 and 2000 Summer Olympics. He previously also represented the Soviet Union, for which he won a bronze medal at the 1988 Summer Olympics.
