= Ludwig Hemauer =

Swiss sports shooter

Personal information
- Born: 3 August 1917
- Died: 28 August 2006 (aged 89)
- Height: 172 cm (5 ft 7 1/2 in)
- Weight: 71 kg (157 lb)

Sport
- Sport: Sports shooting

Ludwig Hemauer (3 August 1917 – 28 August 2006) was a Swiss sports shooter. He competed in the 50 metre pistol event at the 1964 Summer Olympics.
