= Beat Rhyner =

Swiss sports shooter

Personal information
- Born: 9 January 1901
- Died: August 1975 (aged 74)

Sport
- Sport: Sports shooting

Beat Rhyner (9 January 1901 – August 1975) was a Swiss sports shooter. He competed at the 1948 Summer Olympics and 1952 Summer Olympics.
