= Dencho Denev =

Bulgarian sports shooter

Personal information
- Born: 22 August 1936 (age 90) Karnobat, Bulgaria

Sport
- Sport: Sports shooting

Dencho Denev (Bulgarian: Денчо Денев, born 22 August 1936) is a Bulgarian former sports shooter. He competed at five Olympic Games between 1960 and 1976.
