= Philippe Cammaerts =

Belgian sports shooter

Personal information
- Born: 14 May 1894

Sport
- Sport: Sports shooting

Philippe François Cammaerts (born 14 May 1894, date of death unknown) was a Belgian sports shooter. He competed in three events at the 1920 Summer Olympics.
