= Rajmund Stachurski =

Polish sports shooter

Personal information
- Born: 21 June 1935 Kielce, Poland
- Died: 15 March 2004 (aged 68)

Sport
- Sport: Sports shooting

Rajmund Stachurski (21 June 1935 – 15 March 2004) was a Polish sports shooter. He competed at the 1968 Summer Olympics and the 1972 Summer Olympics.
