= Franck Dumoulin =

French sports shooter

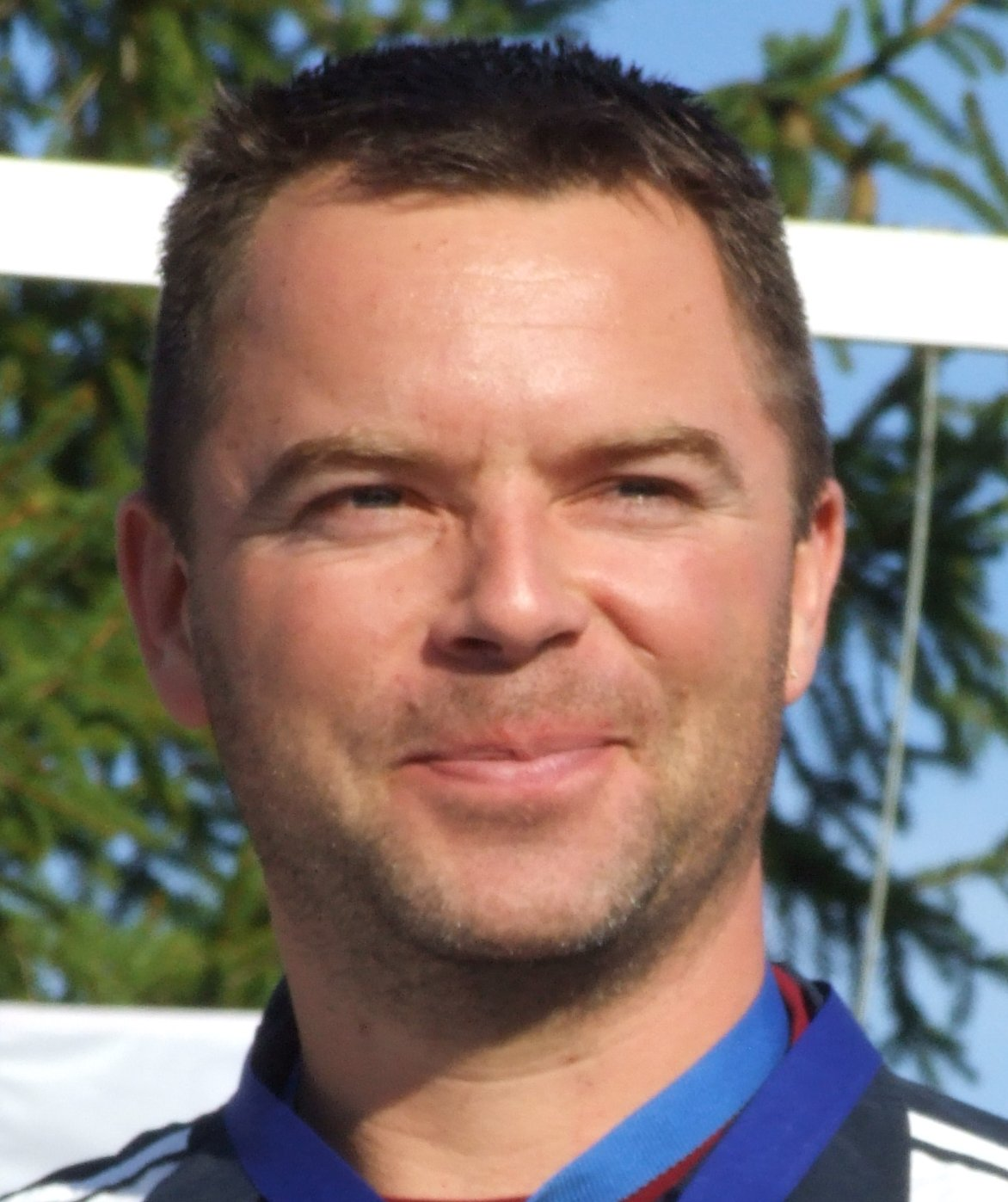

Medal record

Men's shooting

Representing France

Summer Olympics
Gold medal – first place	2000 Sydney	10 m air pistol

Franck Dumoulin (born May 13, 1973, in Denain) is a pistol shooter from Bordeaux, France. He became Olympic Champion in the 10 metre air pistol event at the 2000 Sydney Olympics. He has been World Champion in two events, winning the men's air pistol at the 1994 World Championships in Milan and the 50 metre pistol at the 1998 World Championships in Barcelona.

== Results ==
=== Olympic Games ===
Event	1992	1996	2000	2004	2008	2012
50 metre pistol	36th 544	11th 560	12th 559	24th 550	33rd 548	33rd 541
25 metre rapid fire pistol	—	21st 575	—	—	—	—
10 metre air pistol	22nd 575	36th 573	(gold) Gold; 590+98.9	20th 577	24th 576	18th 577

=== World Championships ===
- 1994 World Championships (Milan, Italia) :
  - Gold Medal in 10 m Air Pistol
  - Bronze Medal in 50 m Pistol
- 1998 World Championships (Barcelona, Spain) :
  - Gold Medal in 50 m Pistol
- 2002 World Championships (Lahti, Finland) :
  - Bronze Medal in 10 m Air Pistol

=== European Championships (since 2001) ===
- 2002 European Championships (Thessalonique, Greece) :
  - Silver medal in 10 m Air Pistol
- 2005 European Championships (Tallinn, Estonia) :
  - Bronze medal in 10 m Air Pistol (Walter Lapeyre, Franck Dumoulin, Manuel Alexandre-Augrand)
- 2006 European Championships (Moscow, Russia) :
  - Gold team medal in 10 m Air Pistol
- 2007 European Championships (Deauville, France) :
  - Silver team medal in 10 m Air Pistol (Walter Lapeyre, Franck Dumoulin, Manuel Alexandre-Augrand)
- 2007 European Championships (Grenada, Spain) :
  - Gold Medal in 25 m Standard Pistol
- 2011 European Championships (Brescia, Italy) :
  - Gold Medal in 10 m Air Pistol

=== World Cups (since 2001) ===
- 5 victories in 10 m Air Pistol
- 1 victory in ISSF World Cup Finals in 10 m Air Pistol (2001 Munich)
- 2 victories in 50 m Pistol
- 2008 World Cup (Beijing, China) :
  - Gold Medal in 10 m Air Pistol

=== Personal bests ===
- 10 meters air pistol : 591/600 (1998, France record)
- 50 meters free pistol: 577/600 (1998, France record)
