= Ragnar Skanåker =

Swedish sports shooter

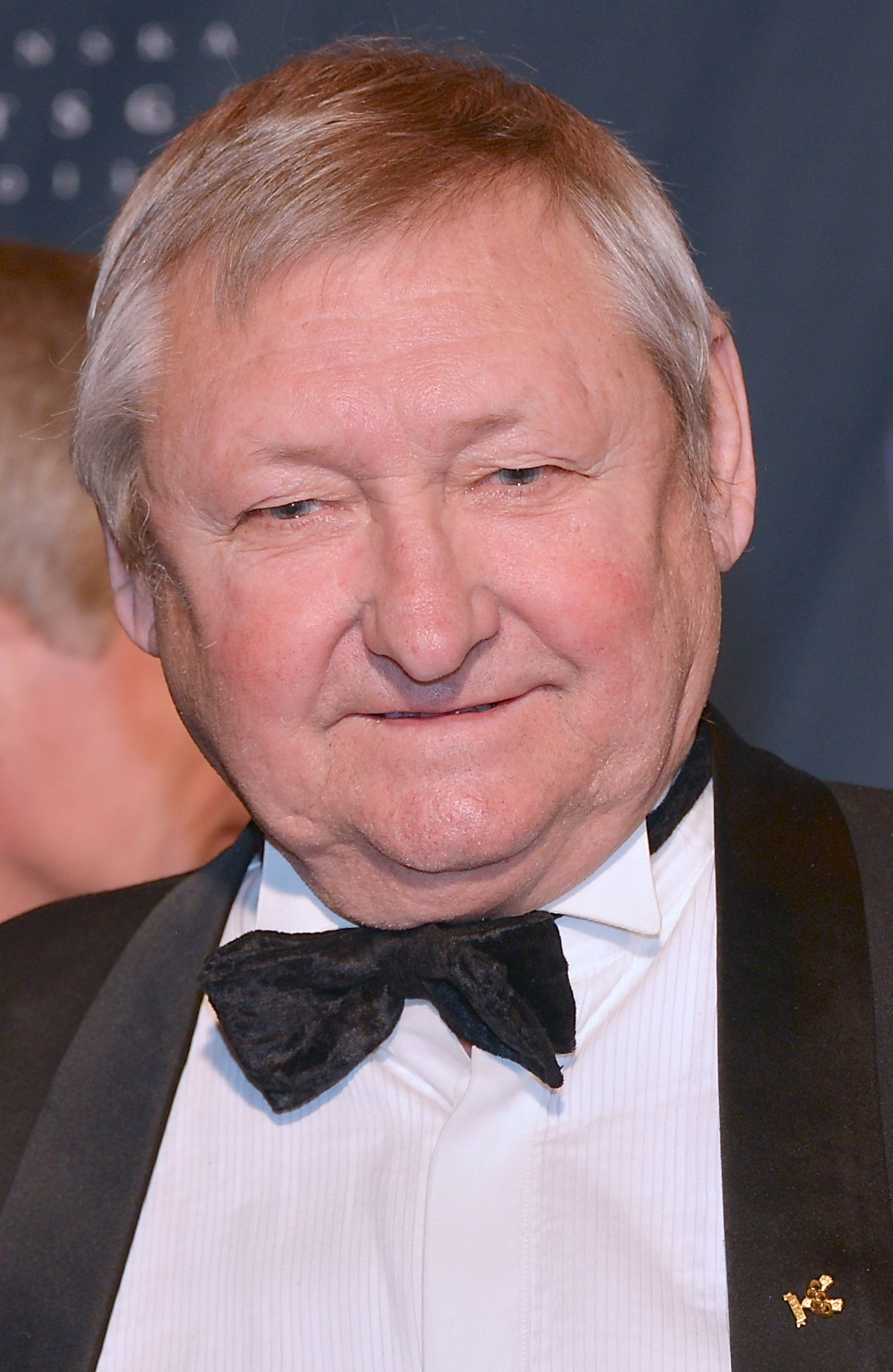
- Ragnar Skanåker at the Swedish Sports Awards 2013

Personal information
- Full name: Karl Ragnar Skanåker
- Nationality: Sweden
- Born: 8 June 1934 (age 92) Säter, Sweden
- Occupation: Businessman
- Website: http://skanaker.se

Sport
- Country: Sweden
- Sport: Pistol shooting
- Now coaching: Asgeir Sigurgeirsson
Medal record
Men's Shooting
Representing Sweden
Olympic Games
Gold medal – first place	1972 Munich	50 m Pistol
Silver medal – second place	1984 Los Angeles	50 m Pistol
Silver medal – second place	1988 Seoul	50 m Pistol
Bronze medal – third place	1992 Barcelona	50 m Pistol
World Championships
Gold medal – first place	1978 Seoul	25 m standard pistol
Gold medal – first place	1982 Caracas	50 m pistol
Gold medal – first place	1983 Innsbruck	10 m air pistol
Silver medal – second place	1978 Seoul	50 m pistol
Bronze medal – third place	1979 Seoul	50 m pistol
Bronze medal – third place	1981 Santo Domingo	10 m air pistol
World Cup Final
Gold medal – first place	1993 Munich	50 m pistol
World Cup
Gold medal – first place	1989 Mexico City	50 m pistol
Gold medal – first place	1992 Munich	50 m pistol
Gold medal – first place	1992 Los Angeles	10 m air pistol
Gold medal – first place	1993 Los Angeles	10 m air pistol
Silver medal – second place	1986 Mexico City	50 m pistol
Silver medal – second place	1990 Zurich	10 m air pistol
Silver medal – second place	1990 Mexico City	10 m air pistol
Silver medal – second place	1990 Suhl	10 m air pistol
Silver medal – second place	1991 Zurich	10 m air pistol
Silver medal – second place	1993 Milan II	10 m air pistol
Bronze medal – third place	1987 Mexico City	50 m pistol
Bronze medal – third place	1988 Munich	50 m pistol
Bronze medal – third place	1990 Los Angeles	50 m pistol
Bronze medal – third place	1993 Los Angeles	50 m pistol
European Championships
Gold medal – first place	1989 Zagreb	50 m pistol
Silver medal – second place	1983 Bucharest	50 m pistol
Silver medal – second place	1988 Stavanger	10 m air pistol
Silver medal – second place	1991 Bologna	50 m pistol
Bronze medal – third place	1993 Brno	50 m pistol

Ragnar Skanåker (born 8 June 1934) is a Swedish competitive pistol shooter who was a world-class shooter for an extremely long period. His international breakthrough came in the 1972 Olympics, where he won the 50 m Pistol event. He is mostly associated with this event, the only one in which he has won Olympic medals (four medals distributed over his participation in seven Olympic games, plus the 1982 World Championship), but he also won the 1983 World Championship in 10 m Air Pistol and, surprisingly to most, the 1978 World Championship in 25 m Standard Pistol, with a new world record (that is still as of 2005 a European record). Skanåker's Swedish record in 50 m Pistol is 583, later a world record qualification in 2014 (Jin Jong-Oh, Korea).

He has participated in Olympic games in 1972, 1976, 1980, 1984, 1988, 1992 and 1996. He would have participated in Athens 2004 thanks to a special invitation from the International Olympic Committee, but the Swedish Olympic Committee decided not to let Skanåker participate due to insufficient results during the year. An upset Skanåker reported that he would be aiming to participate in 2008 instead, the year he turned 74.

Over the years, Skanåker has worked as a shooting coach in several countries, and designed shooting-specific equipment, sometimes in cooperation with famous weapon manufacturers such as Morini. Today, he still competes although less often at the international level. He also engages in various debates in Sweden. He also promotes the precision glasses he has designed.

== Olympic results ==
Olympic results
Event	1972	1976	1980	1984	1988	1992	1996
50 metre pistol	(gold) Gold; 567	5th 559	7th 563	(silver) Silver; 565	(silver) Silver; 564	(bronze) Bronze; 566	25th 555
10 metre air pistol	-	-	-	-	11th 580	26th 574	26th 575
25 metre rapid fire pistol	-	-	31st 579	34th 577	-	-	-

== See also ==
- List of athletes with the most appearances at Olympic Games
