= Artur Gevorgjan =

German sport shooter

Artur Gevorgjan (born 6 November 1965) is a German sport shooter who competed in the 1996 Summer Olympics, in the 2000 Summer Olympics, and in the 2004 Summer Olympics.
