= Martin Tenk =

Czech sport shooter

Martin Tenk (Czech pronunciation: [ˈmarcɪn ˈtɛŋk]; born 8 February 1972 in Ostrava) is a Czech sport shooter and Olympic medalist. He won a bronze medal in the 50 metre pistol at the 2000 Summer Olympics in Sydney. He also competed at the 1996, 2004 and 2008 Summer Olympics.
