= Sorin Babii =

Romanian sport shooter (born 1963)

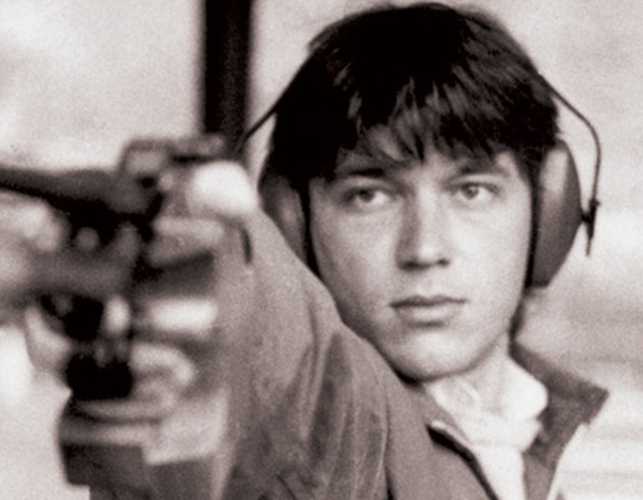

Personal information
- Born: 14 November 1963 (age 62) Arad, Romania
- Height: 170 cm (5 ft 7 in)
- Weight: 80 kg (176 lb)

Sport
- Sport: Shooting
- Event(s): 50 meter pistol 10 meter air pistol
- Club: UNEFS Bucharest
- Coached by: Corneliu Ion
Medal record
Representing Romania
Olympic Games
Gold medal – first place	1988 Seoul	50 m pistol
Bronze medal – third place	1992 Barcelona	10 m air pistol
World Championships
Bronze medal – third place	1989 Sarajevo	10 m air pistol
Bronze medal – third place	1991 Stavanger	10 m air pistol

Sorin Babii (born 14 November 1963) is a retired pistol shooter from Romania. He competed in the 10 m air pistol and 50 m free pistol events at six consecutive Olympics between 1984 and 2004 and won a gold medal in 1988 and a bronze in 1992.

Babii was included to the national team in 1980 and won one gold, two silver and three bronze medals at European junior championships. In 1985 he moved to the senior category and won two bronze medals at world championships and three gold, six silver and four bronze medals at European championships. He took a break from shooting in 2002–2003 and retired for good in 2008 to become a shooting coach. His trainees include the 2012 Olympic champion Alin Moldoveanu.

Babii holds the military rank of lieutenant colonel. His wife Lucia Babii is a former Romanian champion in pistol shooting.

== Records ==
Current world records held in 50 metre pistol
Men's	Teams	1719	Romania (Babii, Ilie, Stan)	September 7, 1985	Osijek (YUG)
