= Shooting at the 1992 Summer Olympics – Men's 50 metre pistol =

Sports shooting at the Olympics

Men's 50 metre pistol at the Games of the XXV Olympiad
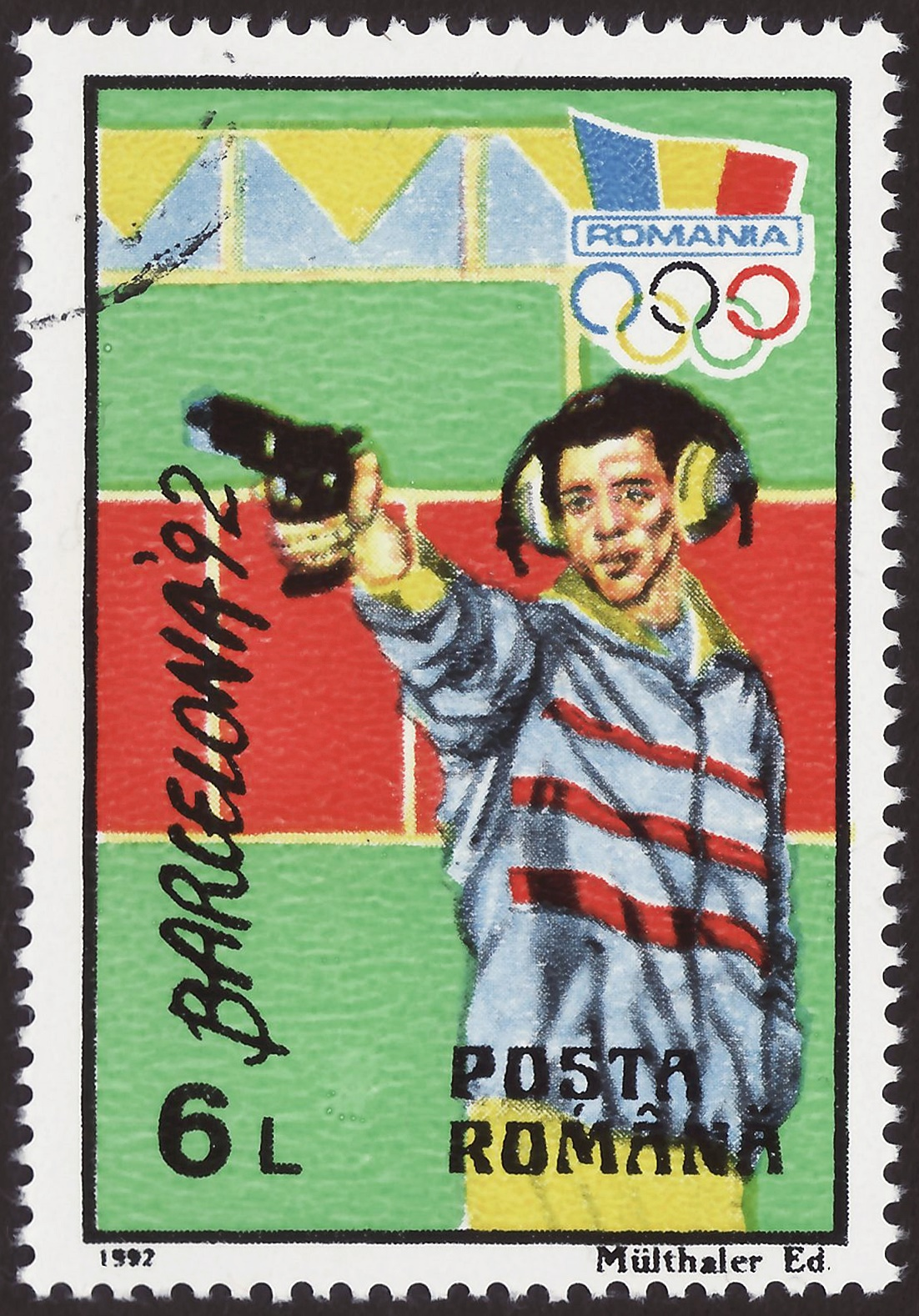
- Romanian stamp commemorating 1992 Olympic shooting
- Venue: Mollet del Vallès
- Date: 26 July 1992
- Competitors: 44 from 29 nations
- Winning score: 658

Medalists
1st place, gold medalist(s)		Kanstantsin Lukashyk; Unified Team
2nd place, silver medalist(s)		Wang Yifu; China
3rd place, bronze medalist(s)		Ragnar Skanåker; Sweden

The men's ISSF 50 meter pistol (then known as free pistol) was one of the thirteen shooting events at the 1992 Summer Olympics. There were 44 competitors from 29 nations. Nations had been limited to two shooters each since the 1952 Games. The competition was held on 26 July 1992 at the Mollet del Vallès shooting range.

Kanstantsin Lukashyk, a 16-year-old Belarusian, unexpectedly had the pre-final lead. The final became severely interrupted by a pistol malfunction, originally assumed to be a technical fault in the electronic target system, for Tanyu Kiryakov who was second but had to leave the competition short of finishing his ten shots. Lukashyk needed a nine for his last shot, and it broke only seconds before the 75-second deadline, but was a nine indeed, and so the sensation was a fact. Wang Yifu won the silver medal and Ragnar Skanåker, 42 years older than the gold medalist, came third, winning his fourth Olympic medal in this event. Skanåker was the first of two men to win four medals in the event, with Jin Jong-oh accomplishing the feat from 2004 to 2016. Wang was the eighth man to win two medals in the event.

== Background ==
This was the 18th appearance of the ISSF 50 meter pistol event. The event was held at every Summer Olympics from 1896 to 1920 (except 1904, when no shooting events were held) and from 1936 to 2016; it was nominally open to women from 1968 to 1980, although very few women participated these years. A separate women's event would be introduced in 1984. 1896 and 1908 were the only Games in which the distance was not 50 metres; the former used 30 metres and the latter 50 yards.

Five of the eight finalists from the 1988 Games returned: gold medalist Sorin Babii of Romania, silver medalist Ragnar Skanåker of Sweden, fourth-place finisher Tanyu Kiryakov of Bulgaria, fifth-place finisher Gernot Eder of East Germany, and eighth-place finisher Wang Yifu of China. Skanåker was a long-time Olympic competitor, having won gold in the event 20 years earlier, placing in the top 10 in both 1976 and 1980, and then taking silver in 1984 and 1988. Wang had been one of the first Chinese medalists, earning bronze in 1984. The 1990 world championship podium had been Spas Koprinkov of Bulgaria, Wang, and Sergei Pyzhianov of the Unified Team (who had won in 1986), all of whom were competing in Barcelona.

Iraq made its debut in the event; twelve former Soviet republics competed together as the Unified Team. Sweden and the United States each made their 16th appearance, tied for most of any nation.

Lukashyk used a Tula TOZ 35.

== Competition format ==
The competition featured two rounds, adding a final to the event. The qualifying round was the same as the previous competitions: each shooter fired 60 shots, in 6 series of 10 shots each, at a distance of 50 metres. The target was round, 50 centimetres in diameter, with 10 scoring rings. Scoring for each shot was up to 10 points, in increments of 1 point. The maximum score possible was 600 points. The top 8 shooters advanced to a final. They shot an additional series of 10 shots, with the score added to their qualifying round score to give a 70-shot total. Ties were broken first by final round score. Any pistol was permitted.

== Records ==
Prior to this competition, the existing world and Olympic records were as follows.

Qualifying (60 shots)
World record	Aleksandr Melentiev (URS)	581	Moscow, Soviet Union	20 July 1980
Olympic record	Aleksandr Melentyev (URS)	581	Moscow, Soviet Union	20 July 1980

Final (70 shots)
World record				
Olympic record	Sorin Babii (ROU)	660	Seoul, South Korea	18 September 1988

No new world or Olympic records were set during the competition.

== Schedule ==
Date	Time	Round
Sunday, 26 July 1992	11:30	Qualifying; Final

== Results ==
=== Qualifying ===
Rank	Shooter	Nation	Score	Notes
1	Kanstantsin Lukashyk	Unified Team	567	Q
2	Tanyu Kiryakov	Bulgaria	567	Q
3	Darius Young	United States	566	Q
4	Ragnar Skanåker	Sweden	566	Q
5	Wang Yifu	China	565	Q
6	Xu Haifeng	China	565	Q
7	István Ágh	Hungary	561	Q
8	Sorin Babii	Romania	561	Q
9	Jerzy Pietrzak	Poland	560	
10	Stein-Olav Fiskebeck	Norway	559	
11	Kim Seon-il	South Korea	558	
11	Spas Koprinkov	Bulgaria	558	
11	Sakari Paasonen	Finland	558	
11	Tu Tai-hsing	Chinese Taipei	558	
15	Benny Östlund	Sweden	557	
16	Sergei Pyzhianov	Unified Team	556	
16	Tarek Zaki Riad	Egypt	556	
16	So Gil-san	North Korea	556	
19	Ben Amonette	United States	555	
20	Gernot Eder	Germany	554	
20	Fumihisa Semizuki	Japan	554	
22	Roberto Di Donna	Italy	553	
22	Stanislav Jirkal	Czechoslovakia	553	
22	Bernardo Tovar	Colombia	553	
25	Philippe Cola	France	552	
26	Alberto Areces	Spain	551	
26	Bengt Sandstrom	Australia	551	
28	Hassan Hassan	Iraq	550	
28	Ryu Myong-hyon	North Korea	550	
30	Phillip Adams	Australia	549	
31	Timo Naveri	Finland	548	
31	Zoltán Papanitz	Hungary	548	
33	Hans-Jürgen Bauer-Neumaier	Germany	547	
33	Park Jong-shin	South Korea	547	
35	Wilson Scheidemantel	Brazil	545	
36	Franck Dumoulin	France	544	
37	Dimitrios Baltas	Greece	543	
37	Rodney Michael Colwell	Canada	543	
37	Mamoru Inagaki	Japan	543	
37	Francisco Sanz Cancio	Spain	543	
37	Greg Yelavich	New Zealand	543	
42	Dario Palazzani	Italy	538	
43	Gilbert King-hong U	Hong Kong	532	
44	Shuaib Adam	Kenya	484	

=== Final ===
Kiryakov had been tied with Lukashyk for the lead going into the final, but scored only 51 points on his first six shots. He slammed his pistol down in frustration, bending his sight, and then abandoned the rest of the competition.

With one shot left for Lukashyk, Wang, and Skanåker, the Belarusian had 649 points to the Chinese and Swedish shooters' 648. Wang would win any tie-breaker among the three, and Lukashyk would lose any tie-breaker. All three shot a 9 for their final shot. This kept Lukashyk at the top for the gold medal; Wang and Skanåker tied, with Wang receiving the silver based on the final round tie-breaker.

Rank	Shooter	Nation	Qualifying	Final	Total
1st place, gold medalist(s)	Kanstantsin Lukashyk	Unified Team	567	91	658
2nd place, silver medalist(s)	Wang Yifu	China	565	92	657
3rd place, bronze medalist(s)	Ragnar Skanåker	Sweden	566	91	657
4	Darius Young	United States	566	89	655
5	Sorin Babii	Romania	561	92	653
6	István Ágh	Hungary	561	91	652
7	Xu Haifeng	China	565	87	652
8	Tanyu Kiryakov	Bulgaria	567	51	618

== Sources ==
- Games of the XXV Olympiad Barcelona 1992: The results (PDF).
