= Shooting at the 1992 Summer Olympics – Men's 10 metre air pistol =

Sports shooting at the Olympics

Men's 10 metre air pistol at the Games of the XXV Olympiad
- Venue: Mollet del Vallès
- Competitors: 45 from 30 nations
- Winning score: 684.8 (OR)

Medalists
1st place, gold medalist(s)		Wang Yifu	China
2nd place, silver medalist(s)		Sergei Pyzhianov	Unified Team
3rd place, bronze medalist(s)		Sorin Babii	Romania

Men's 10 metre air pistol was one of the thirteen shooting events at the 1992 Summer Olympics. This second installment of the event was won by Wang Yifu ahead of the world record holder Sergei Pyzhianov, and Sorin Babii who had established the Olympic record on the new target in the qualification round but lost the final.

== Qualification round ==
Rank	Athlete	Country	Score	Notes
1	Sorin Babii	Romania	586	Q OR
2	Wang Yifu	China	585	Q
3	Sergei Pyzhianov	Unified Team	584	Q
4	Xu Haifeng	China	583	Q
5	Tanyu Kiryakov	Bulgaria	583	Q
6	Sakari Paasonen	Finland	582	Q
7	Jerzy Pietrzak	Poland	582	Q
8	Roberto Di Donna	Italy	581	Q (6th: 97)
9	Kim Seon-il	South Korea	581	(6th: 94)
10	Stanislav Jirkal	Czechoslovakia	580	
11	Philippe Cola	France	579	
12	Spas Koprinkov	Bulgaria	578	
12	Hans-Jürgen Bauer-Neumaier	Germany	578	
14	István Ágh	Hungary	577	
14	Ben Amonette	United States	577	
14	Rodney Colwell	Canada	577	
14	Stein Olav Fiskebeck	Norway	577	
14	Mamoru Inagaki	Japan	577	
19	Phillip Adams	Australia	576	
19	Gernot Eder	Germany	576	
19	Francisco Sanz	Spain	576	
22	Franck Dumoulin	France	575	
22	Boris Kokorev	Unified Team	575	
22	Dario Palazzani	Italy	575	
22	Greg Yelavich	New Zealand	575	
26	Benny Östlund	Sweden	574	
26	Ryu Myong-hyon	North Korea	574	
26	Ragnar Skanåker	Sweden	574	
29	Paweł Hadrych	Poland	573	
29	Bengt Sandstrom	Australia	573	
31	So Gil-san	North Korea	572	
31	Bernardo Tovar	Colombia	572	
33	Park Jong-shin	South Korea	571	
33	Darius Young	United States	571	
35	Dimitrios Baltas	Greece	570	
35	Norman Ortega	Nicaragua	570	
35	Fumihisa Semizuki	Japan	570	
35	Constant Wagner	Luxembourg	570	
39	Timo Näveri	Finland	569	
39	Tarek Zaki Riad	Egypt	569	
39	Tu Tsai-hsing	Chinese Taipei	569	
42	Wilson Scheidemantel	Brazil	568	
43	László Pető	Hungary	562	
44	Fernando Richeri	Uruguay	554	
45	Shuaib Adam	Kenya	531	

OR Olympic record – Q Qualified for final

== Final ==
Rank	Athlete	Qual	Final	Total	Shoot-off	Notes
1st place, gold medalist(s)	Wang Yifu (CHN)	585	99.8	684.8		OR
2nd place, silver medalist(s)	Sergei Pyzhianov (EUN)	584	100.1	684.1		
3rd place, bronze medalist(s)	Sorin Babii (ROU)	586	98.1	684.1		
4	Xu Haifeng (CHN)	583	98.5	681.5		
5	Sakari Paasonen (FIN)	582	98.1	680.1	?	
6	Jerzy Pietrzak (POL)	582	98.1	680.1	?	
7	Tanyu Kiryakov (BUL)	583	96.7	679.7		
8	Roberto Di Donna (ITA)	581	97.5	678.5		

OR Olympic record

== Sources ==
- Games of the XXV Olympiad Barcelona 1992: The results (PDF).
