= Shooting at the 1988 Summer Olympics – Men's 10 metre air pistol =

Sports shooting at the Olympics

Men's 10 metre air pistol at the Games of the XXIV Olympiad
- Date: September 24, 1988
- Competitors: 44 from 29 nations
- Winning score: 687.9 (OR)

Medalists
1st place, gold medalist(s)		Tanyu Kiryakov	Bulgaria
2nd place, silver medalist(s)		Erich Buljung	United States
3rd place, bronze medalist(s)		Xu Haifeng	China

The men's 10 metre air pistol made its Olympic debut at the 1988 Summer Olympics. Erich Buljung equalled the world record (held by Vladas Turla and Igor Basinski) of 590 points in the qualification round, acquiring a two-point lead over the new 50 metre champion, Sorin Babii. Neither of them performed a good final however, and Tanyu Kiryakov eliminated his entire five-point gap to first place. The tie between Kiryakov and Buljung was resolved on grounds of higher final score, with Kiryakov becoming the inaugural champion. Xu Haifeng surpassed Babii to win bronze.

== Qualification round ==
Rank	Athlete	Country	Score	Notes
1	Erich Buljung	United States	590	Q EWR OR
2	Sorin Babii	Romania	588	Q
3	Tanyu Kiryakov	Bulgaria	585	Q
4	Xu Haifeng	China	584	Q
5	Igor Basinski	Soviet Union	583	Q
6	Miroslav Růžička	Czechoslovakia	582	Q
7	Jerzy Pietrzak	Poland	582	Q
8	Boris Kokorev	Soviet Union	581	Q (6th: 99)
9	Gernot Eder	East Germany	581	(6th: 96)
10	Jens Potteck	East Germany	580	
11	Ragnar Skanåker	Sweden	580	
12	Philippe Cola	France	579	
12	Mamoru Inagaki	Japan	579	
12	Arndt Kaspar	West Germany	579	
15	Phillip Adams	Australia	578	
15	Bengt Kamis	Sweden	578	
15	Wang Yifu	China	578	
18	Alfons Messerschmitt	West Germany	577	
18	Sakari Paasonen	Finland	577	
18	Dario Palazzani	Italy	577	
18	Park Jong-sin	South Korea	577	
22	Rolf Beutler	Switzerland	576	
23	Pierre Bremond	France	575	
23	Lyubtcho Diakov	Bulgaria	575	
23	Hubert Foidl	Denmark	575	
23	Min Young-sam	South Korea	575	
23	Fumihisa Semizuki	Japan	575	
28	Don Nygord	United States	574	
29	Bernardo Tovar	Colombia	573	
29	Tu Tai-hsing	Chinese Taipei	573	
31	Lisandro Sugezky	Argentina	572	
31	Tamás Tóth	Hungary	572	
33	Jean Bogaerts	Belgium	571	
34	Horst Krasser	Austria	569	
34	Paul Leatherdale	Great Britain	569	
34	Konstantinos Panageas	Greece	569	
37	Bengt Sandstrom	Australia	568	
38	Zoltán Papanitz	Hungary	567	
39	Jouni Vainio	Finland	566	
40	Hans Hierzer	Austria	565	
40	Carlos Hora	Peru	565	
42	Mariano Lara	Costa Rica	563	
43	Vincenzo Tondo	Italy	559	
44	Shuaib Adam	Kenya	556	
	Jose Pena	Portugal		DNS

DNS Did not start – EWR Equalled world record – OR Olympic record – Q Qualified for final

== Final ==
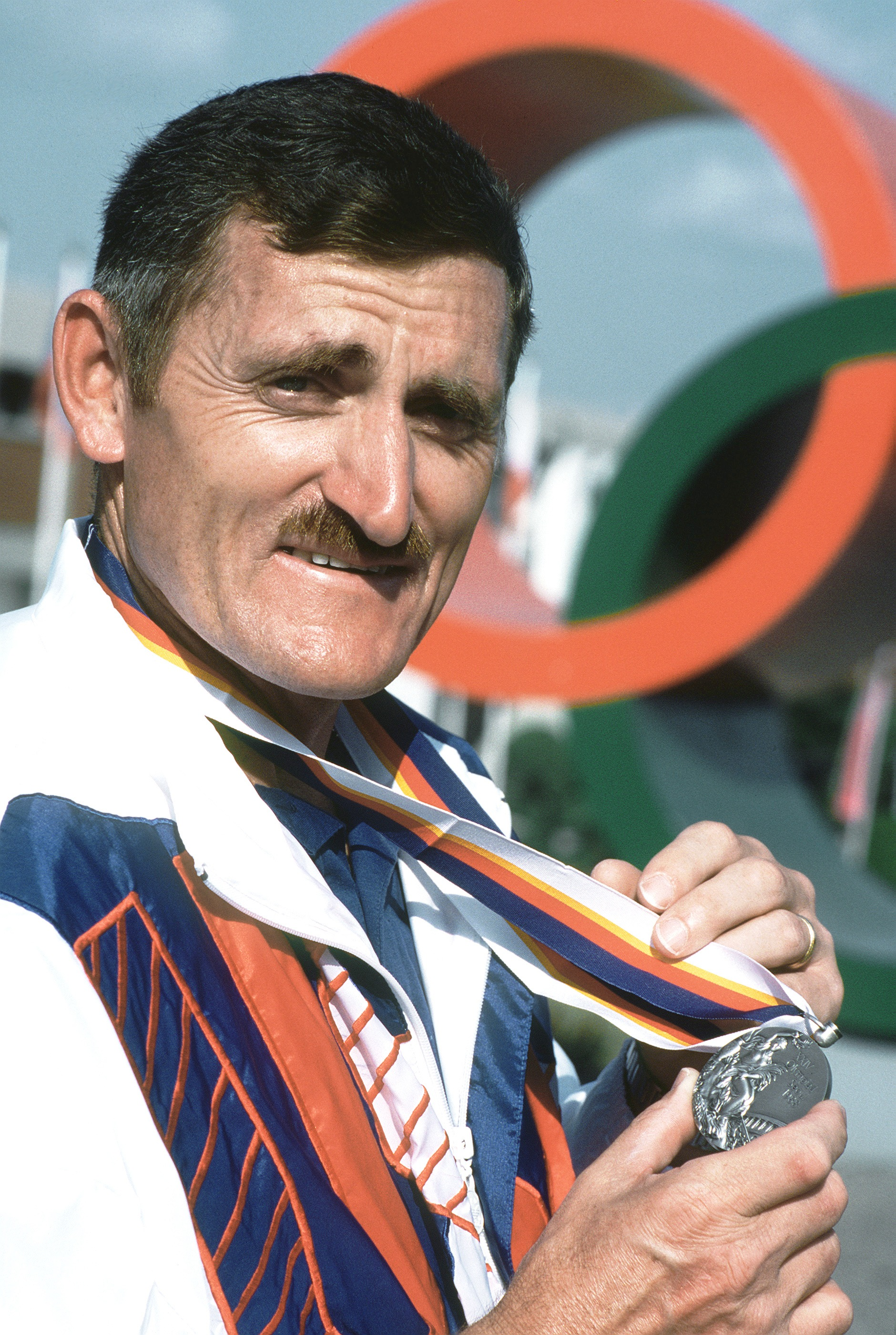
Erich Buljung with his silver medal

Rank	Athlete	Qual	Final	Total	Notes
1st place, gold medalist(s)	Tanyu Kiryakov (BUL)	585	102.9	687.9	OR
2nd place, silver medalist(s)	Erich Buljung (USA)	590	97.9	687.9	OR
3rd place, bronze medalist(s)	Xu Haifeng (CHN)	584	100.5	684.5	
4	Sorin Babii (ROU)	588	95.3	683.3	
5	Igor Basinski (URS)	583	100.2	683.2	
6	Miroslav Růžička (TCH)	582	99.4	681.4	
7	Jerzy Pietrzak (POL)	582	96.3	678.3	
8	Boris Kokorev (URS)	581	96.3	678.3	

OR Olympic record

== Sources ==
- XXIVth Olympiad Seoul 1988 Official Report – Volume 2 Part 2 (PDF).
