= Shooting at the 1996 Summer Olympics – Men's 10 metre air pistol =

Sports shooting at the Olympics

Men's 10 metre air pistol at the Games of the XXVI Olympiad
- Venue: Wolf Creek Shooting Complex
- Date: 20 July 1996
- Competitors: 50 from 31 nations
- Winning score: 684.2

Medalists
| 1st place, gold medalist(s) | | Roberto Di Donna | Italy |
| 2nd place, silver medalist(s) | | Wang Yifu | China |
| 3rd place, bronze medalist(s) | | Tanyu Kiryakov | Bulgaria |

Men's 10 metre air pistol was one of the fifteen shooting events at the 1996 Summer Olympics. The defending champion, Wang Yifu, set an Olympic record of 587 points in the qualification round, taking a two-point lead. His lead increased during the final up to the last shot, where he scored a mere 6.5, and then fainted. He still won his fourth Olympic medal but lost the gold to Roberto Di Donna by the closest possible margin, 0.1 point. Medical staff of the Atlanta Games connected the incident to the heat, around 99 °F (37 °C) outside (although the final hall was air-conditioned).

== Qualification round ==
| Rank | Athlete | Country | Score | Notes |
|---|---|---|---|---|
| 1 | Wang Yifu | China | 587 | Q OR |
| 2 | Jerzy Pietrzak | Poland | 585 | Q |
| 3 | Roberto Di Donna | Italy | 585 | Q |
| 4 | Tanyu Kiryakov | Bulgaria | 584 | Q |
| 5 | Friedhelm Sack | Namibia | 583 | Q |
| 6 | Sergei Pyzhianov | Russia | 583 | Q |
| 7 | Igor Basinski | Belarus | 582 | Q |
| 8 | Tan Zongliang | China | 581 | Q |
| 9 | Artur Gevorgjan | Germany | 580 | |
| 9 | Kanstantsin Lukashyk | Belarus | 580 | |
| 9 | Hans-Jürgen Bauer-Neumaier | Germany | 580 | |
| 12 | Gérard Fernandez | France | 579 | |
| 12 | Vladimir Isakov | Russia | 579 | |
| 12 | Kim Sung-joon | South Korea | 579 | |
| 12 | Viktor Makarov | Ukraine | 579 | |
| 12 | Yuri Melentiev | Kyrgyzstan | 579 | |
| 17 | Vigilio Fait | Italy | 578 | |
| 17 | Constantin Tărloiu | Romania | 578 | |
| 19 | Shukhrat Akhmedov | Uzbekistan | 577 | |
| 19 | Oleksandr Blizniuchenko | Ukraine | 577 | |
| 19 | Zoltán Papanitz | Hungary | 577 | |
| 19 | Bernardo Tovar | Colombia | 577 | |
| 23 | Lennart Andersson | Sweden | 576 | |
| 23 | Zsolt Karacs | Hungary | 576 | |
| 23 | Martin Tenk | Czech Republic | 576 | |
| 26 | Sorin Babii | Romania | 575 | |
| 26 | Pål Hembre | Norway | 575 | |
| 26 | Ragnar Skanåker | Sweden | 575 | |
| 29 | Phillip Adams | Australia | 574 | |
| 29 | Tomohiro Kida | Japan | 574 | |
| 29 | Afanasijs Kuzmins | Latvia | 574 | |
| 29 | Marek Nowak | Poland | 574 | |
| 29 | Jakkrit Panichpatikum | Thailand | 574 | |
| 29 | Jaspal Rana | India | 574 | |
| 29 | Bengt Sandstrom | Australia | 574 | |
| 36 | Franck Dumoulin | France | 573 | |
| 36 | Kim Sung-joon | South Korea | 573 | |
| 36 | Sergio Sanchez | Guatemala | 573 | |
| 39 | Stanislav Jirkal | Czech Republic | 572 | |
| 39 | Alex Tripolski | Israel | 572 | |
| 41 | Neal Caloia | United States | 571 | |
| 41 | Tu Tai Hsing | Chinese Taipei | 571 | |
| 43 | Roman Špirelja | Croatia | 570 | |
| 44 | Ben Amonette | United States | 569 | |
| 44 | Ján Fabo | Slovakia | 569 | |
| 44 | Hassan Hassan | Iraq | 569 | |
| 47 | Kolyo Zakhariev | Bulgaria | 568 | |
| 48 | Masaru Nakashige | Japan | 567 | |
| 49 | Soe Myint | Myanmar | 555 | |
| 50 | Surin Klomjai | Thailand | 547 | |

OR Olympic record – Q Qualified for final

== Final ==
| Rank | Athlete | Qual | Final | Total |
|---|---|---|---|---|
| 1st place, gold medalist(s) | Roberto Di Donna (ITA) | 585 | 99.2 | 684.2 |
| 2nd place, silver medalist(s) | Wang Yifu (CHN) | 587 | 97.1 | 684.1 |
| 3rd place, bronze medalist(s) | Tanyu Kiryakov (BUL) | 584 | 99.8 | 683.8 |
| 4 | Sergei Pyzhianov (RUS) | 583 | 100.5 | 683.5 |
| 5 | Jerzy Pietrzak (POL) | 585 | 97.7 | 682.7 |
| 6 | Tan Zongliang (CHN) | 581 | 101.0 | 682.0 |
| 7 | Igor Basinski (BLR) | 582 | 99.8 | 681.8 |
| 8 | Friedhelm Sack (NAM) | 583 | 97.2 | 680.2 |

== Sources ==
- Olympic Report Atlanta 1996 Volume III: The Competition Results (PDF).
