= Shooting at the 1988 Summer Olympics – Men's 50 metre pistol =

Sports shooting at the Olympics

Men's 50 metre pistol at the Games of the XXIV Olympiad
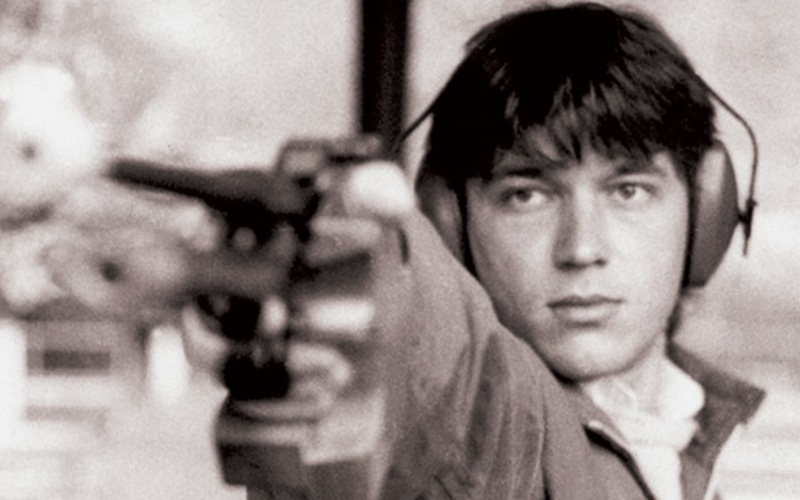
- Sorin Babii
- Venue: Taereung International Shooting Range
- Date: 18 September 1988
- Competitors: 43 from 31 nations
- Winning score: 660 OR

Medalists
1st place, gold medalist(s)		Sorin Babii; Romania
2nd place, silver medalist(s)		Ragnar Skanåker; Sweden
3rd place, bronze medalist(s)		Igor Basinski; Soviet Union

The men's ISSF 50 meter pistol (then called free pistol) was one of the thirteen shooting events at the 1988 Summer Olympics. It was the second Olympic free pistol competition to feature final shooting, after an abortive attempt in 1960. There were 43 competitors from 31 nations. Nations had been limited to two shooters each since the 1952 Games. The event was won by Sorin Babii of Romania, the nation's first victory in the event and first medal in free pistol since 1972. Ragnar Skanåker of Sweden repeated as silver medalist, the second man to earn three medals in the free pistol; four years later, he would become the first to win four medals. Soviet Igor Basinski took bronze.

== Background ==
This was the 17th appearance of the ISSF 50 meter pistol event. The event was held at every Summer Olympics from 1896 to 1920 (except 1904, when no shooting events were held) and from 1936 to 2016; it was nominally open to women from 1968 to 1980, although very few women participated these years. A separate women's event would be introduced in 1984. 1896 and 1908 were the only Games in which the distance was not 50 metres; the former used 30 metres and the latter 50 yards.

Four of the top 10 shooters from the 1984 Games returned: gold medalist Xu Haifeng of China, silver medalist (and 1972 gold medalist and 1976 and 1980 top-10 finisher) Ragnar Skanåker of Sweden, bronze medalist Wang Yifu of China, and sixth-place finisher Philippe Cola of France. Also returning after the 1984 boycott were 1976 gold medalist Uwe Potteck of East Germany and 1980 gold medalist Aleksandr Melentyev of the Soviet Union. The reigning (1986) world champion was Sergei Pyzhianov, but he was not on the Soviet team that instead comprised Melentyev and world record holder (and runner-up in the world championship) Igor Basinski.

New Zealand made its debut in the event. Sweden and the United States each made their 15th appearance, tied for most of any nation.

Babii used a Tula TOZ 35.

== Competition format ==
The competition featured two rounds, adding a final to the event. The qualifying round was the same as the previous competitions: each shooter fired 60 shots, in 6 series of 10 shots each, at a distance of 50 metres. The target was round, 50 centimetres in diameter, with 10 scoring rings. Scoring for each shot was up to 10 points, in increments of 1 point. The maximum score possible was 600 points. Now, however, the top 8 shooters advanced to a final. They shot an additional series of 10 shots, with the score added to their qualifying round score to give a 70-shot total. Ties were broken first by final round score. Any pistol was permitted.

== Records ==
Prior to this competition, the existing world and Olympic records were as follows.

Qualifying (60 shots)
World record	Aleksandr Melentyev (URS)	581	Moscow, Soviet Union	20 July 1980
Olympic record	Aleksandr Melentyev (URS)	581	Moscow, Soviet Union	20 July 1980

Final (70 shots)
World record	Igor Basinski (URS)			
Olympic record	New format	—	—	—

Sorin Babii set the initial Olympic record for the final format at 660 points.

== Schedule ==
All times are Korea Standard Time adjusted for daylight savings (UTC+10)

Date	Time	Round
Sunday, 18 September 1988	13:00	Qualifying; Final

== Results ==
=== Qualifying ===
Rank	Shooter	Nation	Score	Notes
1	Igor Basinski	Soviet Union	570	Q
2	Sorin Babii	Romania	566	Q
3	Tanyu Kiryakov	Bulgaria	566	Q
4	Ragnar Skanåker	Sweden	564	Q
5	Gyula Karácsony	Hungary	564	Q
6	Wang Yifu	China	563	Q
7	Arndt Kaspar	West Germany	562	Q
8	Gernot Eder	East Germany	561	Q
9	Uwe Potteck	East Germany	559	
10	Zoltán Papanitz	Hungary	559	
11	Don Nygord	United States	559	
12	Aleksandr Melentiev	Soviet Union	558	
12	Dario Palazzani	Italy	558	
14	Benny Östlund	Sweden	557	
14	Jerzy Pietrzak	Poland	557	
16	Jean Bogaerts	Belgium	556	
16	Miroslav Růžička	Czechoslovakia	556	
16	Darius Young	United States	556	
19	Phillip Adams	Australia	555	
19	Philippe Cola	France	555	
19	Sakari Paasonen	Finland	555	
19	Tu Tai-hsing	Chinese Taipei	555	
23	Roberto Di Donna	Italy	554	
23	Lyubtcho Diakov	Bulgaria	554	
23	Alfons Messerschmitt	West Germany	554	
23	Bengt Sandstrom	Australia	554	
23	Fumihisa Semizuki	Japan	554	
23	Xu Haifeng	China	554	
29	Min Young-sam	South Korea	552	
29	Bernardo Tovar	Colombia	552	
29	U. G. King Hung	Hong Kong	552	
32	Hans Hierzer	Austria	550	
33	Bruno Déprez	France	547	
34	Paul Leatherdale	Great Britain	546	
34	Undralbatiin Lkhagvaa	Mongolia	546	
36	Rolf Beutler	Switzerland	545	
36	Konstantinos Panageas	Greece	545	
38	Horst Krasser	Austria	543	
39	Carlos Hora	Peru	540	
40	Lisandro Sugezky	Argentina	539	
41	Greg Yelavich	New Zealand	535	
42	Shuaib Adam	Kenya	532	
43	Hubert Foidl	Denmark	531	

=== Final ===
Rank	Shooter	Nation	Qualifying	Final	Total	Notes
1st place, gold medalist(s)	Sorin Babii	Romania	566	94	660	OR
2nd place, silver medalist(s)	Ragnar Skanåker	Sweden	564	93	657	
3rd place, bronze medalist(s)	Igor Basinski	Soviet Union	570	87	657	
4	Tanyu Kiryakov	Bulgaria	566	90	656	
5	Gernot Eder	East Germany	561	93	654	
6	Gyula Karácsony	Hungary	564	90	654	
7	Arndt Kaspar	West Germany	562	89	651	
8	Wang Yifu	China	563	88	651	

== Sources ==
- XXIVth Olympiad Seoul 1988 Official Report – Volume 2 Part 2 (PDF).
