= Shooting at the 1996 Summer Olympics – Men's 50 metre pistol =

Sports shooting at the Olympics

Men's 50 metre pistol at the Games of the XXVI Olympiad
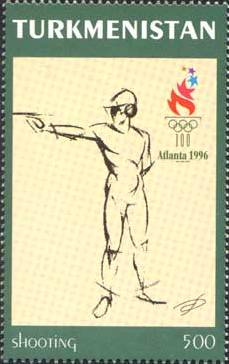
- Turkmenistan stamp commemorating 1996 Olympic shooting
- Venue: Wolf Creek Shooting Complex
- Date: 23 July
- Competitors: 45 from 28 nations
- Winning score: 666.4 OR

Medalists
1st place, gold medalist(s)		Boris Kokorev; Russia
2nd place, silver medalist(s)		Igor Basinski; Belarus
3rd place, bronze medalist(s)		Roberto Di Donna; Italy

The men's ISSF 50 meter pistol (then known as free pistol) was one of the fifteen shooting events at the 1996 Summer Olympics, held on 23 July at the Wolf Creek Shooting Complex in Atlanta. There were 45 competitors from 28 nations. It was the first time decimals were used in the 50 metre pistol finals. Boris Kokorev set a new Olympic record after scoring 570 points in the qualification round and 96.4 in the final, winning the gold medal, while places 2 through 5 were occupied by Belarusian and Italian shooters. Russia, Belarus, and Italy all received their first medal in the free pistol. Silver medalist Igor Basinski was the ninth man to win multiple medals in the event.

== Background ==
This was the 19th appearance of the ISSF 50 meter pistol event. The event was held at every Summer Olympics from 1896 to 1920 (except 1904, when no shooting events were held) and from 1936 to 2016; it was nominally open to women from 1968 to 1980, although very few women participated these years. A separate women's event would be introduced in 1984. 1896 and 1908 were the only Games in which the distance was not 50 metres; the former used 30 metres and the latter 50 yards.

Five of the eight finalists from the 1992 Games returned: gold medalist Kanstantsin Lukashyk of the Unified Team (now competing for Belarus), silver medalist Wang Yifu of China, bronze medalist Ragnar Skanåker of Sweden, fifth-place finisher Sorin Babii of Romania, and eighth-place finisher Tanyu Kiryakov of Bulgaria. Skanåker was in his seventh Games, having won gold in 1972, silver in 1984 and 1988, and placing in the top 10 in 1976 and 1980 along with his 1992 final appearance. Wang was also a long-time veteran, earning bronze in 1984 before reaching the finals in 1988 and 1992. Babii was newer, but like Lukashyk and Skanåker had won Olympic gold (in 1988). Kiryakov would go on to win gold four years later; along with the 1996 winner Boris Kokorev, there were 5 past or future gold medalists in the event competing. Wang was the reigning (1994) world champion, with Ukraine's Viktor Makarov the runner-up.

Belarus, the Czech Republic, Kyrgyzstan, Slovakia, Ukraine, and Uzbekistan each made their debut in the event. Sweden and the United States each made their 17th appearance, tied for most of any nation.

Kokorev used a Tula TOZ 35.

== Competition format ==
The competition featured two rounds, qualifying and final. The qualifying round was the same as the previous competitions: each shooter fired 60 shots, in 6 series of 10 shots each, at a distance of 50 metres. The target was round, 50 centimetres in diameter, with 10 scoring rings. Scoring for each shot was up to 10 points, in increments of 1 point. The maximum score possible was 600 points. The top 8 shooters advanced to a final; ties necessary for qualifying were broken by 6th-series score, while other ties were not broken. They shot an additional series of 10 shots, with the score added to their qualifying round score to give a 70-shot total. The 1996 competition added decimal scoring to the final; shots could score up to 10.9 for the final. The total maximum was therefore 709.0. Ties were broken first by final round score. Any pistol was permitted.

== Records ==
Prior to this competition, the existing world and Olympic records were as follows.

Qualifying (60 shots)
World record	Aleksandr Melentiev (URS)	581	Moscow, Soviet Union	20 July 1980
Olympic record	Aleksandr Melentyev (URS)	581	Moscow, Soviet Union	20 July 1980

Final (70 shots)
World record				
Olympic record	Sorin Babii (ROU)	660	Seoul, South Korea	18 September 1988

Boris Kokorev set a new Olympic record for the final round with 666.4 points.

== Schedule ==
Date	Time	Round
Tuesday, 23 July 1996	12:00	Qualifying; Final

== Results ==
=== Qualifying ===
Rank	Shooter	Nation	Score	Notes
1	Boris Kokorev	Russia	570	Q
2	Roberto Di Donna	Italy	569	Q
3	Vigilio Fait	Italy	569	Q
4	Igor Basinski	Belarus	565	Q
5	Kanstantsin Lukashyk	Belarus	564	Q
6	Martin Tenk	Czech Republic	564	Q
7	Wang Yifu	China	564	Q
8	Sergio Sánchez	Guatemala	563	Q 6th series: 95
9	Shukhrat Akhmedov	Uzbekistan	563	6th series: 94
9	Jerzy Pietrzak	Poland	563	6th series: 94
11	Franck Dumoulin	France	560	
11	Kim Sung-joon	South Korea	560	
11	Masaru Nakashige	Japan	560	
11	Marek Nowak	Poland	560	
15	Stanislav Jirkal	Czech Republic	559	
16	Aleksandr Danilov	Russia	558	
16	Bernardo Tovar	Colombia	558	
16	Alex Tripolski	Israel	558	
19	Kolio Zakhariev	Bulgaria	557	
20	Sorin Babii	Romania	556	
20	Ján Fabo	Slovakia	556	
20	Tanyu Kiryakov	Bulgaria	556	
20	Viktor Makarov	Ukraine	556	
20	Yuri Melentiev	Kyrgyzstan	556	
25	Ben Amonette	United States	555	
25	Oleksandr Bliznyuchenko	Ukraine	555	
25	Ragnar Skanåker	Sweden	555	
28	Gérard Fernandez	France	553	
28	Zoltán Papanitz	Hungary	553	
30	Phillip Adams	Australia	552	
30	Constantin Tarloiu	Romania	552	
30	Xu Dan	China	552	
33	Zsolt Karacs	Hungary	551	
34	Tu Tai Hsing	Chinese Taipei	550	
35	Hans-Jürgen Bauer-Neumaier	Germany	549	
35	Bengt Sandstrom	Australia	549	
37	Artur Gevorgjan	Germany	548	
37	Kim Sung-joon	South Korea	548	
39	Neal Caloia	United States	544	
40	Pål Hembre	Norway	542	
40	Surin Klomjai	Thailand	542	
42	Lennart Andersson	Sweden	538	
43	Jakkrit Panichpatikum	Thailand	536	
44	Trịnh Quốc Việt	Vietnam	535	
45	Jaspal Rana	India	534	

=== Final ===
Rank	Shooter	Nation	Qualifying	Final	Total	Notes
1st place, gold medalist(s)	Boris Kokorev	Russia	570	96.4	666.4	OR
2nd place, silver medalist(s)	Igor Basinski	Belarus	565	97.0	662.0	
3rd place, bronze medalist(s)	Roberto Di Donna	Italy	569	92.8	661.8	
4	Kanstantsin Lukashyk	Belarus	564	96.1	660.1	
5	Vigilio Fait	Italy	569	90.8	659.8	
6	Wang Yifu	China	564	95.3	659.3	
7	Martin Tenk	Czech Republic	564	93.7	657.7	
8	Sergio Sánchez	Guatemala	563	94.1	657.1	

== Sources ==
- Olympic Report Atlanta 1996 Volume III: The Competition Results (PDF).
