= 1982 World Shooting Championships =

43rd edition of the World Shooting Championships

- Host city: Caracas, Venezuela
- Level: Senior
- Events: 53

The 1982 World Shooting Championships was the 43rd edition of the global shooting competition World Shooting Championships, organised by the International Shooting Sport Federation.

== Results men ==
=== Rifle ===
Event	1st place, gold medalist(s)	2nd place, silver medalist(s)	3rd place, bronze medalist(s)
50 m 3 positions	(Soviet Union) Vladimir Lvov	(West Germany) Peter Heinz	(Soviet Union) Viktor Vlasov
50 m 3 positions team	Soviet Union; Kirill Ivanov; Vladimir Lvov; Aleksandr Mitrofanov; Viktor Vlasov	United Kingdom; Alister Allan; Malcolm Cooper; Barry Dagger; J. Davis	Norway; Arnt-Olan Haugland; Terje Melbye-Hansen; Harald Stenvaag; Geir Skirbekk
50 m prone	(Soviet Union) Viktor Danilchenko	(United States) William Beard	(Soviet Union) Viktor Vlasov
50 m prone team	Soviet Union; Viktor Danilchenko; Gennadi Lushikov; Aleksandr Mitrofanov; Viktor Vlasov	West Germany; Hubert Bichler; Peter Heinz; Ulrich Lind; Werner Seibold	Austria; Albert Deuring; Lothar Heinrich; Hannes Rainer; Wolfram Waibel
50 m kneeling	(West Germany) Peter Heinz	(Soviet Union) Vladimir Lvov	(Soviet Union) Aleksandr Mitrofanov
50 m kneeling team	United Kingdom; Alister Allan; Malcolm Cooper; Barry Dagger; J. Davis	Soviet Union; Kirill Ivanov; Vladimir Lvov; Aleksandr Mitrofanov; Viktor Vlasov	United States; Michael Anti; Ray Carter; Rod Fitz Randolph; Lones Wigger
50 m standing	(Soviet Union) Kirill Ivanov	(Norway) Harald Stenvaag	(United States) Rod Fitz Randolph
50 m standing team	Soviet Union; Kirill Ivanov; Vladimir Lvov; Aleksandr Mitrofanov; Viktor Vlasov	Norway; Arnt-Olan Haugland; Terje Melbye-Hansen; Harald Stenvaag; Geir Skirbekk	United Kingdom; Alister Allan; Malcolm Cooper; Barry Dagger; J. Davis
300 m 3 positions	(Soviet Union) Gennadi Lushchikov	(Soviet Union) Viktor Danilchenko	(United Kingdom) Malcolm Cooper
300 m 3 positions team	Soviet Union; Viktor Danilchenko; Vladimir Lvov; Gennadi Lushchikov; Gennadi Larin	United States; Ray Carter; Glenn Dubis; Divid Kimes; Lones Wigger	Norway; Trond Kjoell; Geir Skirbekk; Harald Stenvaag; Kare Inge Viken
300 m prone	(Soviet Union) Viktor Danilchenko	(United Kingdom) Malcolm Cooper	(United States) Ernest Van de Zande
300 m prone team	Soviet Union; Viktor Danilchenko; Vladimir Lvov; Gennadi Lushchikov; Viktor Vlasov	Switzerland; Kuno Bertschy; Anton Müller; Walter Inderbitzin; Ueli Sarbach	Norway; Tore Hartz; T. Hansen; Geir Skirbekk; Kare Inge Viken
300 m kneeling	(Soviet Union) Viktor Danilchenko	(Switzerland) Kuno Bertschy	(United Kingdom) Malcolm Cooper
300 m kneeling team	Soviet Union; Viktor Danilchenko; Vladimir Lvov; Gennadi Lushchikov; Gennadi Larin	Norway; Trond Kjoell; Geir Skirbekk; Harald Stenvaag; Kare Inge Viken	United States; Ray Carter; Glenn Dubis; Divid Kimes; Lones Wigger
300 m standing	(Soviet Union) Gennadi Lushchikov	(Soviet Union) Vladimir Lvov	(United States) Lones Wigger
300 m standing team	Soviet Union; Viktor Danilchenko; Vladimir Lvov; Gennadi Lushchikov; Gennadi Larin	United States; Ray Carter; Glenn Dubis; Divid Kimes; Lones Wigger	West Germany; Hubert Bichler; Peter Heinz; Ulrich Lind; Rudolf Krenn

=== Standard rifle ===
Event	1st place, gold medalist(s)	pts	2nd place, silver medalist(s)	pts	3rd place, bronze medalist(s)	pts
300 m	(Norway) Harald Stenvaag	579	(United States) Lones Wigger	574	(Soviet Union) Vladimir Lvov	573
300 m Team	Switzerland; Hans Braem; Martin Billeter; Kuno Bertschy; B. Carabin	2245	Norway; Tore Hartz; Geir Skirbekk; Harald Stenvaag; Trond Kjoell	2243	Soviet Union; Viktor Danilchenko; Vladimir Lvov; Gennadi Lushchikov; Viktor Vlasov	2238

=== Air rifle ===
Event	1st place, gold medalist(s)	pts	2nd place, silver medalist(s)	pts	3rd place, bronze medalist(s)	pts
10 m	(East Germany) Frank Rettkowski	587	(Switzerland) Pierre-Alain Dufaux	584	(East Germany) Andreas Wolfram	582
10 m Team	Norway; Arnt-Olan Haugland; Per Erik Lokken; S. Sotberg; Harald Stenvaag	2309	West Germany; Kurt Hillenbrand; Kurt Rieth; Oswald Schlipf; Bernhard Suess	2304	East Germany; Bernd Hartstein; Sven Martini; Frank Rettkowski; Andreas Wolfram	2299

=== Pistol ===
Event	1st place, gold medalist(s)	pts	2nd place, silver medalist(s)	pts	3rd place, bronze medalist(s)	pts
50 m	(Sweden) Ragnar Skanåker	568	(Soviet Union) Aleksandr Melentyev	567	(Soviet Union) Anatoli Egrishin	563
50 m Team	Soviet Union; Anatoli Egrishin; Aleksandr Melentyev; Sergei Sumatokhin; Vladas Turla	2248	United States; Erich Buljung; Jimmie McCoy; Don Nygord; Eugene Ross	2211	China; Zhijian Chou; Z. Su; M. Wang; Y. Wang	2207

=== Rapid fire pistol ===
Event	1st place, gold medalist(s)	pts	2nd place, silver medalist(s)	pts	3rd place, bronze medalist(s)	pts
25m	(Soviet Union) Igor Puzirev	596	(Sweden) Ove Gunnarsson	595	(West Germany) Alfred Radke	595
25m Team	Soviet Union; Afanasijs Kuzmins; Igor Puzirev; Sergei Rysev; Vladimir Vokhmianin	2376	Romania; G. Calota; Corneliu Ion; V. Suliu; Marin Stan	2362	Hungary; László Orbán; Laszlo Nemeth; Gábor Plank; I. Szalai	2355

=== Center fire pistol ===
Event	1st place, gold medalist(s)	pts	2nd place, silver medalist(s)	pts	3rd place, bronze medalist(s)	pts
25m	(Soviet Union) Vladas Turla	592	(Soviet Union) Sergéi Rysev	591	(France) Jacques Cherers	590
25m Team	Soviet Union; Afanasijs Kuzmins; Igor Puzirev; Sergei Rysev; Vladas Turla	2356	Switzerland; Marcel Ansermet; S. Schnyder; Reinhard Reuss; Alex Tschui	2330	Finland; Seppo Makinen; Hannu Paavola; P. Palakangas; Jouni Vainio	2325

=== Standard pistol ===
Event	1st place, gold medalist(s)	pts	2nd place, silver medalist(s)	pts	3rd place, bronze medalist(s)	pts
25m	(Soviet Union) Vladas Turla	583	(Soviet Union) Aleksandr Melentyev	578	(Italy) Aldo Andreotti	576
25m Team	Soviet Union; Anatoli Egrishin; Aleksandr Melentyev; Sergei Sumatokhin; Vladas Turla	2299	Italy; Aldo Andreotti; G. Mussini; Giuseppe Quadro; Renato Zambon	2281	United States; Erich Buljung; John Kailer; Melvin Makin; Don Nygord	2270

=== Air pistol ===
Event	1st place, gold medalist(s)	pts	2nd place, silver medalist(s)	pts	3rd place, bronze medalist(s)	pts
10 m	(Soviet Union) Vladas Turla	590	(Soviet Union) Alexandr Melentiev	580	(Soviet Union) Anatoli Egrishin	579
10 m Team	Soviet Union; Anatoli Egrishin; Aleksandr Melentyev; Sergei Sumatokhin; Vladas Turla	2327	United States; Erich Buljung; Jimmie McCoy; Darius Young; Don Nygord	2284	Sweden; W. Andersson; W. Nilsson; Benny Oestlund; Ragnar Skanåker	2281

=== Running target ===
Event	1st place, gold medalist(s)	pts	2nd place, silver medalist(s)	pts	3rd place, bronze medalist(s)	pts
50 m	(Soviet Union) Yuri Kadenatsi	587	(Poland) Jerzy Greszkiewicz	586	(Soviet Union) Nikolái Dedov	582
50 m Team	Soviet Union; Nikolái Dedov; Alexandr Ivanchijin; Yuri Kadenatsi; Igor Sokolov	2316	Hungary; Andras Doleschall; Zoltan Keczeli; Kalman Kovacs; Istvan Peni	2291	China; B. He; Zhongyuan Wang; Y. Xie; J. Xu	2275
Misto 50 m	(Soviet Union) Nikolái Dedov	392	(Soviet Union) Yuri Kadenatsi	392	(Poland) Jerzy Greszkiewicz	392
Misto 50 m Team	Soviet Union; Nikolái Dedov; Alexandr Ivanchijin; Yuri Kadenatsi; Sergéi Savostianov	1556	Hungary; Andras Doleschall; Zoltan Keczeli; Kalman Kovacs; Istvan Peni	1544	Finland; Heikki Koskinen; J. Livonen; Matti Saeteri; T. Vuohensittz	1510
10 m	(Soviet Union) Igor Sokolov	378	(Soviet Union) Sergéi Savostianov	377	(Soviet Union) Alexandr Ivanchijin	376
10 m Team	Soviet Union; Yuri Kadenatsi; Alexandr Ivanchijin; Sergéi Savostianov; Igor Sokolov	1505	China; B. He; Zhongyuan Wang; Y. Xie; J. Xu	1448	United States; Todd Bensley; Michael English; R. George; Randy Stewart	1447

=== Trap ===
Event	1st place, gold medalist(s)	pts	2nd place, silver medalist(s)	pts	3rd place, bronze medalist(s)	pts
Individual	(Spain) Eladio Vallduvi (Italy) Luciano Giovannetti	197			(Italy) Daniele Cioni	197
Team	Italy; Silvano Basagni; Daniele Cioni; Luciano Giovannetti; Angelo Alberto Giani	587	France; Christophe Blein; Bernard Blondeau; Michel Carrega; Patrick Mahaut	582	Soviet Union; Alexandr Asanov; Alexandr Lavrinenko; Sergei Okhotski; I. Semenov	581

=== Skeet ===
Event	1st place, gold medalist(s)	pts	2nd place, silver medalist(s)	pts	3rd place, bronze medalist(s)	pts
Individual	(United States) Daniel Carlisle	199	(United States) Dean Clark	199	(West Germany) Norbert Hofmann	199
Team	United States; Daniel Carlisle; Dean Clark; Matthew Dryke; Alger Mullins	591	France; G. Crepin; Stefan Tyssier; Elie Penot; Bruno Rossetti	587	Italy; I. Cianfarani; Celso Giardini; Luca Scribani Rossi; Raffaele Ventilati	583

== Medal table ==
#	Country	1st place, gold medalist(s)	2nd place, silver medalist(s)	3rd place, bronze medalist(s)	Tot.
1	Soviet Union	34	15	14	63
2	United States	3	9	9	21
3	East Germany	3	1	3	7
4	Norway	2	4	3	9
5	West Germany	2	3	3	8
6	Italy	2	1	3	6
7	Spain	2	1	0	3
8	Switzerland	1	4	0	5
9	China	1	3	6	10
10	Hungary	1	3	1	5
11	United Kingdom	1	2	3	6
12	Sweden	1	1	3	5
13	Australia	1	1	0	2
14	Finland	1	0	2	3
15	France	0	2	2	4
16	Poland	0	1	1	2
17	Canada	0	1	0	1
17	Romania	0	1	0	1
19	Austria	0	0	1	1
	TOTAL	55	53	54	162

== See also ==
- Trap World Champions
