= Austria at the 1988 Summer Olympics =

- IOC code: AUT
- NOC: Austrian Olympic Committee

in Seoul
- Competitors: 73 (66 men and 7 women) in 17 sports
- Flag bearer: Hubert Raudaschl
- Medals Ranked 29th: Gold 1 Silver 0 Bronze 0 Total 1

Summer Olympics appearances (overview)
- 1896; 1900; 1904; 1908; 1912; 1920; 1924; 1928; 1932; 1936; 1948; 1952; 1956; 1960; 1964; 1968; 1972; 1976; 1980; 1984; 1988; 1992; 1996; 2000; 2004; 2008; 2012; 2016; 2020; 2024

Other related appearances
- 1906 Intercalated Games

Austria competed at the 1988 Summer Olympics in Seoul, South Korea. 73 competitors, 66 men and 7 women, took part in 62 events in 17 sports.

== Medalists ==
Medal	Name	Sport	Event	Date
Gold	Peter Seisenbacher	Judo	Men's 86 kg	29 September

== Competitors ==
The following is the list of number of competitors in the Games.

Sport	Men	Women	Total
Athletics	9	1	10
Boxing	1	–	1
Cycling	7	0	7
Diving	2	0	2
Equestrian	2	0	2
Fencing	5	0	5
Gymnastics	0	1	1
Judo	3	–	3
Modern pentathlon	1	–	1
Rowing	5	0	5
Sailing	8	0	8
Shooting	7	4	11
Swimming	6	0	6
Table tennis	2	0	2
Tennis	2	1	3
Weightlifting	1	–	1
Wrestling	5	–	5
Total	66	7	73

== Athletics ==
Men's Long Jump

- Andreas Steiner
  - Qualification — 7.61m (→ did not advance)
- Teddy Steinmayr
  - Qualification — 7.36m (→ did not advance)

Men's Shot Put

- Klaus Bodenmüller
  - Qualifying Heat – 18.89m (→ did not advance)

Men's Hammer Throw

- Johann Lindner
  - Qualifying Heat — 76.60m
  - Final — 75.36m (→ 10th place)

Men's Decathlon

- Georg Werthner — 7753 points (→ 21st place)

1. 100 metres — 11.52s
2. Long Jump — 7.36m
3. Shot Put — 13.93m
4. High Jump — 1.94m
5. 400 metres — 49.99s
6. 110m Hurdles — 15.64s
7. Discus Throw — 38.82m
8. Pole Vault — 4.60m
9. Javelin Throw — 67.04m
10. 1.500 metres — 4:26.42s

== Cycling ==
Seven cyclists, all men, represented Austria in 1988.

Men's road race

- Mario Traxl
- Johann Lienhart
- Dietmar Hauer

Men's team time trial

- Dietmar Hauer
- Norbert Kostel
- Johann Lienhart
- Mario Traxl

Men's team pursuit

- Roland Königshofer
- Johann Lienhart
- Kurt Schmied
- Franz Stocher

Men's points race

- Roland Königshofer

== Diving ==
Men

Athlete	Event	Preliminary		Final	
Athlete	Event	Points	Rank	Points	Rank
Niki Stajković	3 m springboard	579.63	9 Q	570.60	9
Erich Pils	3 m springboard	532.19	19	Did not advance	

== Fencing ==
Five fencers, all men, represented Austria in 1988.

Men's foil

- Benny Wendt
- Anatol Richter

Men's épée

- Arno Strohmeyer
- Johannes Nagele
- Axel Birnbaum

== Modern pentathlon ==
One male pentathlete represented Austria in 1988.

Men's Individual Competition:

- Helmut Spannagl — 4833 pts (→ 36th place)

Men's Team Competition:

- Spannagl — 4833 pts (→ 23rd place)

== Sailing ==
Men

Athlete	Event	Race							Net points	Final rank
Athlete	Event	1	2	3	4	5	6	7	Net points	Final rank
Thomas Wallner	Division II	17	16	~~RET~~	10	7	11	1	91.0	11
Hans Spitzauer	Finn	~~DSQ~~	13	DSQ	3	12	YMP	14	119.7	15
Christian Binder; Heimo Hecht	470	15	19	18	16	17	~~RET~~	RET	151.0	24

Open

Athlete	Event	Race							Net points	Final rank
Athlete	Event	1	2	3	4	5	6	7	Net points	Final rank
Norbert Petschel; Christian Claus	Tornado	2	~~11~~	8	5	4	2	4	46.0	4
Hubert Raudaschl; Stephan Puxkandl	Star	13	~~RET~~	11	15	9	1	13	91.0	13

== Shooting ==
Men

Athlete	Event	Qualification		Final	
Athlete	Event	Score	Rank	Score	Rank
Albert Deuring	50 m rifle prone	589	45	did not advance	
Albert Deuring	10 m air rifle	581	34	did not advance	
Hannes Gufler	50 m rifle three positions	1155	38	did not advance	
Hannes Gufler	10 m air rifle	577	41	did not advance	
Lothar Heinrich	50 m rifle three positions	1157	36	did not advance	
Lothar Heinrich	50 m rifle prone	595	15	did not advance	
Hans Hierzer	50 m pistol	550	32	did not advance	
Hans Hierzer	10 m air pistol	565	40	did not advance	
Horst Krasser	50 m pistol	543	38	did not advance	
Horst Krasser	10 m air pistol	569	34	did not advance	
Hermann Sailer	25 m rapid fire pistol	584	29	did not advance	

Women

Athlete	Event	Qualification		Final	
Athlete	Event	Score	Rank	Score	Rank
Sylvia Baldessarini	50 m rifle three positions	578	16	did not advance	
Sylvia Baldessarini	10 m air rifle	393	9	did not advance	
Dorothee Deuring	50 m rifle three positions	576	20	did not advance	
Christine Strahalm	25 m pistol	580	18	did not advance	
Christine Strahalm	10 m air pistol	379	8 Q	472.6	8
Barbara Troger	10 m air rifle	383	33	did not advance	

Open

Athlete	Event	Qualification		Final	
Athlete	Event	Score	Rank	Score	Rank
Josef Hahnenkamp	Skeet	143	33	did not advance	

== Swimming ==
Men's 50m Freestyle

- Markus Opatril
  - Heat — 24.32 (→ did not advance, 36th place)
- Alexander Pilhatsch
  - Heat — 24.42 (→ did not advance, 38th place)

Men's 100m Freestyle

- Markus Opatril
  - Heat — 52.66 (→ did not advance, 41st place)
- Stefan Opatril
  - Heat — DSQ (→ did not advance, no ranking)

Men's 200m Freestyle

- Alesander Placheta
  - Heat — 1:56.11 (→ did not advance, 41st place)

Men's 100m Breaststroke

- Thomas Böhm
  - Heat — 1:04.96 (→ did not advance, 29th place)

Men's 200m Breaststroke

- Thomas Böhm
  - Heat — 2:24.15 (→ did not advance, 34th place)

Men's 100m Butterfly

- Reinhold Leitner
  - Heat — 56.72 (→ did not advance, 29th place)

Men's 200m Butterfly

- Reinhold Leitner
  - Heat — 2:02.18 (→ did not advance, 18th place)

Men's 4 × 100 m Freestyle Relay

- Stefan Opatril, Markus Opatril, Alesander Placheta, and Alexander Pilhatsch
  - Heat — DSQ (→ did not advance, no ranking)

== Tennis ==
Women's Singles Competition

- Barbara Paulus
  1. First Round – Defeated Bettina Fulco (Argentina) 7-6 6–4
  2. Second Round – Defeated Jana Novotná (Czechoslovakia) 6-4 6–3
  3. Third Round – Lost to Zina Garrison (USA) 5-7 2-6
