= Shooting at the 1984 Summer Olympics – Men's 50 metre pistol =

Sports shooting at the Olympics

Men's 50 metre free pistol at the Games of the XXIII Olympiad
- Shooting pictogram
- Venue: Prado Regional Park
- Date: July 29, 1984
- Competitors: 56 from 38 nations
- Winning score: 566

Medalists
1st place, gold medalist(s)		Xu Haifeng; China
2nd place, silver medalist(s)		Ragnar Skanåker; Sweden
3rd place, bronze medalist(s)		Wang Yifu; China

The men's ISSF 50 meter pistol was a shooting sports event held as part of the Shooting at the 1984 Summer Olympics programme. The competition was held on July 29, 1984, at the shooting ranges in Los Angeles. 56 shooters from 38 nations competed. Nations had been limited to two shooters each since the 1952 Games. The event was won by Xu Haifeng of China, with his countryman Wang Yifu taking bronze. As the free pistol was the first medal event in 1984 and the People's Republic of China fully competed for the first time in 1984, these were the first Olympic medals won by competitors from that nation. Ragnar Skanåker of Sweden took silver, 12 years after winning his first medal (gold in 1972); he was the seventh man to win multiple medals in the event and third to win medals 12 years apart (Torsten Ullman had medaled in 1936 and 1948, Harald Vollmar in 1968, 1976, and 1980).

== Background ==
This was the 16th appearance of the ISSF 50 meter pistol event. The event was held at every Summer Olympics from 1896 to 1920 (except 1904, when no shooting events were held) and from 1936 to 2016; it was nominally open to women from 1968 to 1980, although very few women participated these years. A separate women's event would be introduced in 1984. 1896 and 1908 were the only Games in which the distance was not 50 metres; the former used 30 metres and the latter 50 yards.

Three of the top 10 shooters from the 1980 Games returned: seventh-place finisher (and 1972 gold medalist and 1976 fifth-place finisher) Ragnar Skanåker of Sweden, eighth-place finisher Paavo Palokangas of Finland, and ninth-place finisher Sylvio Carvalho of Brazil. Skanåker was also the reigning (1982) world champion. Many of the rest of the 1980 Olympians were from Eastern Bloc nations, including the reigning gold medalist and 1982 world championship runner-up Aleksandr Melentyev of the Soviet Union.

The People's Republic of China, Chinese Taipei, Ecuador, India, Oman, Saudi Arabia, and Senegal each made their debut in the event. Sweden and the United States each made their 14th appearance, tied for most of any nation.

Xu used a Hämmerli 150.

== Competition format ==
Each shooter fired 60 shots, in 6 series of 10 shots each, at a distance of 50 metres. The target was round, 50 centimetres in diameter, with 10 scoring rings. Scoring for each shot was up to 10 points, in increments of 1 point. The maximum score possible was 600 points. Any pistol was permitted.

== Records ==
Prior to this competition, the existing world and Olympic records were as follows.

World record	Aleksandr Melentyev (URS)	581	Moscow, Soviet Union	20 July 1980
Olympic record	Aleksandr Melentyev (URS)	581	Moscow, Soviet Union	20 July 1980

No new world or Olympic records were set during the competition.

== Schedule ==
Date	Time	Round
Sunday, 29 July 1984	9:00	Final

== Results ==
Rank	Shooter	Nation	Score
1st place, gold medalist(s)	Xu Haifeng	China	566
2nd place, silver medalist(s)	Ragnar Skanåker	Sweden	565
3rd place, bronze medalist(s)	Wang Yifu	China	564
4	Jürgen Hartmann	West Germany	560
5	Vincenzo Tondo	Italy	560
6	Philippe Cola	France	559
7	Hector de Lima Carrilla	Venezuela	558
8	Paavo Palokangas	Finland	558
9	Erich Buljung	United States	558
10	Tu Tsai-hsing	Chinese Taipei	558
11	Sorin Babii	Romania	555
11	Carlos Hora	Peru	555
11	Vinzenz Schweighofer	Austria	555
14	Rolf Beutler	Switzerland	554
14	Don Nygord	United States	554
16	Seo In-taek	South Korea	553
17	Bernardo Tovar	Colombia	552
18	Tom Guinn	Canada	551
18	Chikafumi Hirai	Japan	551
20	Phil Adams	Australia	550
20	Ernesto Alais	Argentina	550
20	Walter Bauza	Argentina	550
23	Gerhard Beyer	West Germany	548
23	Galo Miño	Ecuador	548
25	Sylvio Carvalho	Brazil	546
25	Mariano Lara	Costa Rica	546
27	Ángel Corsino Fernández	Spain	543
27	Arthur Spencer	Great Britain	543
29	Ove Gunnarsson	Sweden	540
29	Shigetoshi Tashiro	Japan	540
31	Shuaib Adam	Kenya	539
31	Baljit Singh Kharab	India	539
31	Park Seung-rin	South Korea	539
31	Somchai Thingpakdee	Thailand	539
35	Sabiamad Abdul Ahad	Malaysia	537
36	Gary Aramist	Israel	536
36	Gilbert U	Hong Kong	536
38	Luis Ortiz	Colombia	535
39	José Jacques Pena	Portugal	533
40	Herbert Binder	Switzerland	532
40	Edgar Espinoza	Venezuela	532
40	Pedro García Jr.	Peru	532
43	Paúl Margraff	Ecuador	531
44	William Henderson	Virgin Islands	528
45	Rolf Lofstad	Norway	523
46	Geoffrey Robinson	Great Britain	521
47	Juma Al-Rahbi	Oman	520
48	Manhi Al-Mutairy	Saudi Arabia	513
48	Jean-Pierre Gasparotti	Monaco	513
50	Joël Nigiono	Monaco	505
51	Germano Bollini	San Marino	500
51	Gianfranco Giardi	San Marino	500
53	Amadou Ciré Baal	Senegal	499
54	Nirundon Lepananon	Thailand	494
55	Roland Scott	Virgin Islands	459
56	Ali Al-Ghafiri	Oman	445
