= Kim Sung-joon =

Kim Sung-joon or Kim Sung-jun may refer to:

- Kim Sung-joon (sport shooter, born 1968), South Korean Olympic sport shooter
- Kim Sung-jun (sport shooter, born 1973), South Korean Olympic sport shooter
- Kim Sung-joon (footballer), South Korean footballer
- Kim Sung-jun (boxer) (1953–1989), South Korean boxer
