= Francisco Sanz =

Francisco Sanz is the name of:

- Francisco Sanz (actor), Spanish actor
- Francisco Sanz (sport shooter), Spanish sport shooter

== See also ==
- Paco Sanz
