= Lennart Andersson =

Lennart Andersson may refer to:

- Lennart Andersson (athlete) (1914–1997), Swedish Olympic triple jumper
- Lennart Andersson (rower) (1925–2004), Swedish Olympic rower
- Lennart Andersson (sport shooter) (born 1957), Swedish Olympic shooter
