= Areces =

Areces is a surname. Notable people with the surname include:

- Alberto Areces (born 1970), Spanish sports shooter
- Carlos Areces (born 1976), Spanish actor, singer, and comics artist
- Ramón Areces (1904–1989), Spanish businessman
- Vicente Álvarez Areces (born 1947), Spanish politician
