= Sung-joon =

- Hangul: 성준
- RR: Seongjun
- MR: Sŏngjun

Sung-joon or Seong-joon or Seong-jun (Korean: 성준) is a Korean given name. As of 2026, the name ranked 97th out of 36,179 male names and 10,284th out of 28,726 female names. A total of 5,583 people, consisting of 5,582 males and 1 female, were born with the name from 2008 to 2026.

Notable people with the name include:

- Sung Joon, birth name Bang Sung-joon, South Korean actor
- Gill, birth name Gill Seong-joon, South Korean singer
- Bang Seong-joon, South Korean voice actor
- Jo Seong-joon, South Korean footballer
- Kim Sung-joon (sport shooter, born 1968), South Korean Olympic sport shooter
- Kim Sung-jun (sport shooter, born 1973), South Korean Olympic sport shooter
- Kim Sung-joon (footballer), South Korean footballer
- Kim Sung-jun (boxer) (1953–1989), South Korean boxer

Fictional people:

- Ryu Seong-joon, male protagonist of 2022 South Korean drama Blind, portrayed by Ok Taecyeon

== See also ==
- List of Korean given names
