= Schweighöfer =

Schweighöfer may refer to:

- Matthias Schweighöfer (born 1981), German actor
- Schweighofer, an Austrian piano manufacturer
- Vinzenz Schweighofer (born 1942), Austrian sports shooter
