= Płacheta =

Płacheta is a surname. Notable people with the surname include:

- Alexander Placheta (born 1967), Austrian swimmer
- Marcin Płacheta (born 1979), Polish bobsledder
- Przemysław Płacheta (born 1998), Polish footballer
