= Amonette =

Amonette is a surname. Notable people with the surname include:

- Ben Amonette (born 1954), American sports shooter
- Ruth Leach Amonette (1916–2004), American businesswoman, author, and educator
