= Palazzani =

Palazzani is an Italian surname. Notable people with the surname include:

- Dario Palazzani (born 1954), Italian sports shooter
- Guglielmo Palazzani (born 1991), Italian rugby union player
