= Caloia =

Caloia is an Italian surname. Notable people with the surname include:

- Angelo Caloia (born 1939), Italian economist and banker
- Neal Caloia (born 1970), American sports shooter
