= Gufler =

Gufler is a surname. Notable people with the surname include:

- Bernard Gufler (1903–1973), American diplomat
- Edith Gufler (born 1962), Italian sport shooter
- Frants Gufler (born 1957), Danish curler
- Hans Gufler (born c. 1961), Danish curler and curling coach
- Johannes Gufler (born 1946), Austrian sports shooter
- Max Gufler (1918–1966), Austrian serial killer
- Michael Gufler (born 1979), Italian alpine skier
- Philipp Gufler (born 1989), German artist
