= Park Sung-joon =

Park Sung-joon (Korean: 박성준) is a Korean name consisting of the family name Park and the given name Sung-joon, and may also refer to:

- Park Sung-joon (politician) (born 1969), South Korean politician
- Park Sung-joon (golfer) (born 1986), South Korean golfer
- Park Sung-joon (electronic sports) (born 1986), South Korean electronic sports player
