= Corsino =

Corsino is a male given name. Notable people with the name include:

== People with the given name ==
- Corsino Fernández (1920–2011), Argentine long-distance runner
- Corsino Fortes (1933–2015), Cape Verdean writer, poet and diplomat

== People with the middle name ==
- Ángel Corsino Fernández (born 1951), Spanish sports shooter
