= László Pető =

László Pető may refer to:

- László Pető (fencer)
- László Pető (sport shooter)
