= Paweł Hadrych =

Polish sports shooter

Personal information
- Nationality: Polish
- Born: 14 June 1972 (age 53) Zielona Góra, Poland

Sport
- Sport: Sports shooting

Paweł Hadrych (born 14 June 1972) is a Polish sports shooter. He competed in the men's 10 metre air pistol event at the 1992 Summer Olympics.
