= Walter Bauza =

Argentine sports shooter

Personal information
- Nationality: Argentine
- Born: 11 October 1939
- Died: 17 January 2015 (aged 75)

Sport
- Sport: Sports shooting

Walter Bauza (11 October 1939 – 17 January 2015) was an Argentine sports shooter. He competed in the men's 50 metre free pistol event at the 1984 Summer Olympics.
