= Seo In-taek =

South Korean sports shooter

Personal information
- Nationality: South Korean
- Born: 5 November 1962 (age 62)

Sport
- Sport: Sports shooting

Seo In-taek (born 5 November 1962) is a South Korean sports shooter. He competed in the men's 50 metre free pistol event at the 1984 Summer Olympics.
