= Jürgen Hartmann (sport shooter) =

German sports shooter

Personal information
- Nationality: German
- Born: 20 July 1953 (age 71); Ringgau, Germany

Sport
- Sport: Sports shooting

Jürgen Hartmann (born 20 July 1953) is a German sports shooter. He competed in the men's 50 metre free pistol event at the 1984 Summer Olympics.
