= Joël Nigiono =

Monegasque sports shooter (born 1952)

Personal information
- Nationality: Monaco
- Born: 8 January 1952 (age 74)

Sport
- Sport: Sports shooting

Joël Nigiono (born 8 January 1952) is a Monegasque sports shooter. He competed in the men's 50 metre free pistol event at the 1984 Summer Olympics.
