= Ján Fabo =

Slovak sport shooter

M
Personal information
- Nationality: Slovakia
- Born: 4 March 1963 (age 63) Partizánske, Czechoslovakia
- Height: 1.82 m (5 ft 11 1/2 in)
- Weight: 85 kg (187 lb)

Sport
- Sport: Shooting
- Event(s): 10 m air pistol, 50 metre pistol

Jan Fabo (born 4 March 1963 in Partizánske) is a Slovak sport shooter. He competed in pistol shooting events at the Summer Olympics in 1996 and 2000.

== Olympic results ==
Event	1996	2000
10 metre air pistol (men)	T-44th	T-17th
50 metre pistol (men)	T-20th	T-27th
