= István Ágh (sport shooter) =

Hungarian sport shooter

Istvan Agh (born 25 June 1970 in Debrecen) is a Hungarian sport shooter. He competed at the 1992 Summer Olympics in the men's 50 metre pistol event, in which he placed sixth, and the men's 10 metre air pistol event, in which he tied for 14th place.
