= Arthur Spencer =

British sports shooter

Personal information
- Nationality: British
- Born: 21 May 1947 (age 77); Pontefract, England

Sport
- Sport: Sports shooting

Arthur Spencer (born 21 May 1947) is a British sports shooter. He competed in the men's 50 metre free pistol event at the 1984 Summer Olympics.
