= William Henderson (sport shooter) =

U.S. Virgin Islands sports shooter (born 1929)

Personal information
- Full name: William Jackson Henderson
- Born: November 4, 1929 (age 96) Ames, Iowa, U.S.

Sport
- Sport: Sports shooting

William Jackson Henderson (born November 4, 1929) is a former sports shooter who represented the United States Virgin Islands. He competed in the men's 50 metre free pistol event at the 1984 Summer Olympics.

Born in Ames, Iowa, Henderson grew up in Fort Collins, Colorado, and attended Colorado State University, where he received a Bachelor of Science degree. He later earned a master's degree in plant pathology from the University of California, Davis, and a Doctor of Dental Medicine degree from the Medical College of Georgia. He later moved to the United States Virgin Islands where he became a dentist and was the executive secretary for the Virgin Islands Dental Association.

Henderson served in the United States Army. In 1984, while living in the Virgin Islands, he was chosen to represent them at the 1984 Summer Olympics in sport shooting, where he competed in the men's 50m free pistol event and placed 44th out of 56. He later represented the Virgin Islands as a sports shooting delegate for the Olympics in 1988 and 1992. Henderson retired in the 2000s, and stayed a resident of the Virgin Islands.
