= Gyula Karácsony =

Hungarian sport shooter

Gyula Karácsony (born September 1, 1956, in Tét) is a Hungarian sport shooter. He competed at the 1988 Summer Olympics in the men's 50 metre pistol event, in which he placed sixth.
