= Miroslav Růžička =

Czech sport shooter

Miroslav Růžička (born 23 December 1959 in Chomutov) is a former Czechoslovak sport shooter.

== Career ==
He competed at the 1988 Summer Olympics in the Men's 50 Metre Pistol event, in which he tied for 16th place, and the Men's 10 Metre Air Pistol event, in which he placed sixth.
