= Dan Iuga =

Romanian sport shooter (born 1954)

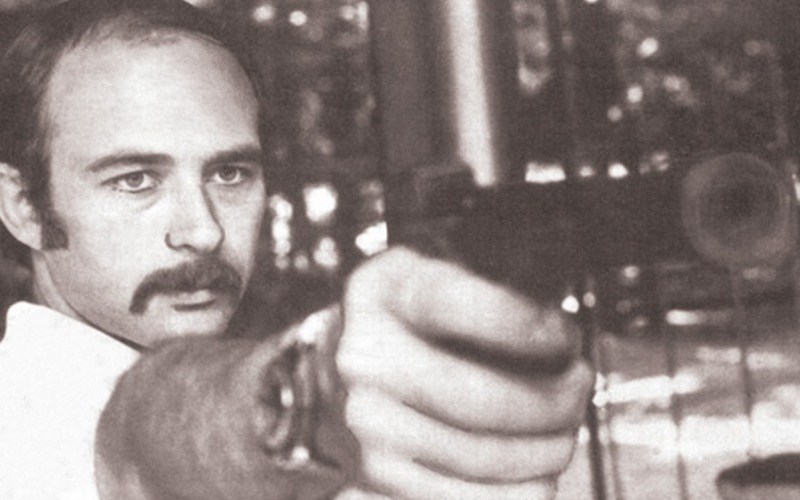

Personal information
- Full name: Daniel Iuga
- Born: November 13, 1945 (age 80) Târgu Ocna, Romania
- Height: 168 cm (5 ft 6 in)
- Weight: 73 kg (161 lb)

Sport
- Sport: Sports shooting
- Event: Pistol
- Club: CS Dinamo București
- Coached by: Viorel Maciu (1964–72); Stefan Petrescu (1972–80)
Medal record
Representing Romania
Olympic Games
| Silver medal – second place | 1972 Munich | 50 m pistol, ind. |
World Championships
| Gold medal – first place | 1974 Bern-Thun | 25 m center fire pistol, ind. |
| Bronze medal – third place | 1974 Bern-Thun | 25 m rapid fire pistol, team |
Representing United States
Pan American Games
| Gold medal – first place | 1995 Mar del Plata | 25 m center fire pistol, ind. |
| Silver medal – second place | 1995 Mar del Plata | 25 m rapid fire pistol, ind. |

Daniel Iuga (born November 13, 1945) is a retired Romanian-American pistol shooter and coach. He competed for Romania in the mixed free pistol 50 m event at the 1972, 1976 and 1980 Olympics and won a silver medal in 1972.

As a teenager Iuga played football and was a keen skier and kayaker, placing second in the 500 m kayak singles at the 1961 National Junior Championships. He took up sport shooting only in 1964. The same year he won a national junior title, and in 1971 set his first national record. At the 1974 World Championships he won an individual gold and a team bronze medal. He retired from competitions after the 1980 Olympics and was appointed as a national pistol shooting coach. In 1981 he defected to West Germany while giving an invited lecture there, and for 1.5 years worked as a consultant at a gun factory in Ulm. In 1983 he immigrated to the United States, with his wife Nina and daughters Laura (born c. 1975) and Ileana (born c. 1976) joining him there in April 1985. In the U.S. Iuga coached the national pistol shooting team starting in late 1983 and resigning in April 1992. In this capacity he attended the 1984 and 1988 Olympics and 1991 Pan American Games. In 1993 he went out of retirement and in 1995 won a U.S. national title. The same year he won two individual medals at the Pan American Games. He retired for good in 1999.
