= Alex Tripolski =

Israeli sports shooter

Personal information
- Native name: אלכס טריפולסקי
- National team: Israel
- Born: April 2, 1962 (age 64) Russia

Sport
- Sport: Sport shooting
- Events: Men's Free Pistol, 50 metres; Men's Air Pistol, 10 metres

Alex Tripolski (Hebrew: אלכס טריפולסקי; born April 2, 1962) is an Israeli former Olympic sport shooter. He is also the President of the Israel Curling Federation.

== Early life ==
Tripolski was born in Russia, and is Jewish. He made aliyah (immigrated to Israel) from Russia in 1990.

== Shooting career ==
Tripolski won the silver medal in the pistol division while representing Israel at the 1995 European Championships. In 1996 he finished 10th in the 50 meter free rifle at the Union International de Tir (UIT) World Cup Finals. At the 2001 World Cup, Tripolski finished 15th in the 10 meter air pistol competition with 576 points, 8 behind the winner.

Tripolski competed for Israel at the 1996 Summer Olympics in Atlanta, at the age of 34, in Shooting--Men's Free Pistol, 50 metres, and came in tied for 16th with 572 total points. He also competed in Shooting--Men's Air Pistol, 10 metres, and came in tied for 39th with a 558 total points.

At the 2013 Maccabiah Games, Tripolski won the gold medal in the 10 meter air pistol with a score of 571, and the silver medal in the 50 meter free pistol with a score of 530.

== Curling ==
As of 2013 Tripolski was heading the sport of curling in Israel, and that year the World Curling Federation reinstated Israel as a full member. In 2015 he was President of the Israel Curling Federation.

== See also ==
- List of select Jewish shooters
