= Pierre Bremond =

French sports shooter

Personal information
- Nationality: French
- Born: 18 June 1958 (age 66); Arles, France

Sport
- Sport: Sports shooting

Pierre Bremond (born 18 June 1958) is a French sports shooter. He competed in the men's 10 metre air pistol event at the 1988 Summer Olympics.
