= Rolf Lofstad =

Norwegian sports shooter (born 1953)

Personal information
- Nationality: Norwegian
- Born: 31 October 1953 (age 72) Oslo, Norway

Sport
- Sport: Sports shooting

Rolf Lofstad (born 31 October 1953) is a Norwegian sports shooter. He competed in the men's 50 metre free pistol event at the 1984 Summer Olympics.
