= Norman Ortega =

Nicaraguan sports shooter

Personal information
- Nationality: Nicaraguan
- Born: 18 December 1969 (age 56)

Sport
- Sport: Sports shooting

Norman Ortega (born 18 December 1969) is a Nicaraguan sports shooter. He competed in the men's 10 metre air pistol event at the 1992 Summer Olympics.

Ortega won a silver medal in the 10-meter air pistol category at the 2nd Iberoamerican Shooting Championship celebrated in San Salvador in 2010.
