= Herbert Binder =

Swiss sports shooter

Personal information
- Nationality: Swiss
- Born: 16 February 1932 (age 93)

Sport
- Sport: Sports shooting

Herbert Binder (born 16 February 1932) is a Swiss sports shooter. He competed in the men's 50 metre free pistol event at the 1984 Summer Olympics.
