= Shooting at the 1995 Pan American Games =

Shooting at the 1999 Pan American Games

The 1995 Pan American Games were held in Mar del Plata, Argentina. Team and individual shooting contests were organized for men and women.The canoeing competitions at the 1995 Pan American Games took place in Mar Del Plata, Argentina. The United States won 24 of the 36 gold medals awarded.

== Men's events ==
Event	Gold	Silver	Bronze
10 metre air pistol	Norbelis Bárzaga; Cuba	Ben Amonette; United States	Vicente de la Cruz; Cuba
10 metre air rifle	Ken Johnson; United States	Jean-François Sénécal; Canada	Glenn Dubis; United States
10 metre running target	Attila Solti; Guatemala	Lonn Saunders; United States	Andrés Felipe Torres; Colombia
10 metre running target mixed runs	Andrés Felipe Torres; Colombia	Josa Hernandez; Cuba	Lonn Saunders; United States
25 metre center fire pistol	Dan Iuga; United States	Júlio Almeida; Brazil	Eduardo Suárez; United States
25 metre rapid fire pistol	Guido Arbona; Cuba	Dan Iuga; United States	Bernardo Tovar; Colombia
25 metre standard pistol	Rafael Olivera; Argentina	Donald Nygord; United States	Ben Amonette; United States
50 metre pistol	Abel Juncosa; Cuba	Ben Amonette; United States	Jodson Edington; Brazil
50 metre rifle prone	Robert Harbison; United States	Bruce Meredith; Virgin Islands	Michel Dion; Canada
50 metre rifle three positions	Ricardo Rusticucci; Argentina	David Johnson; United States	Robert Foth; United States
300 metre standard rifle	Robert Harbison; United States	Robert Foth; United States	Edgardo Peragallo; Argentina
300 metre rifle prone	Webster Wright; United States	Ángel Velarte; Argentina	Robert Foth; United States
300 metre rifle three positions	Ken Johnson; United States	Stephen Goff; United States	Ricardo Rusticucci; Argentina
Trap	Lance Bade; United States	Bret Erickson; United States	George Leary; Canada
Double trap	Alex Gyori; Canada	Kirk Rynolds; Canada	Stevens Puls; United States
Skeet	Arnaldo Rodriguez; Cuba	Juan Rodriguez; Cuba	J.F Nikon; Canada

== Women's events ==
Event	Gold	Silver	Bronze
10 metre air pistol	Connie Petracek; United States	Lorena Guado; Argentina	Lilia María Pérez; Cuba
10 metre air rifle	Elizabeth Bourland; United States	Amelia Fournel; Argentina	Ann Marie Pfiffner; United States
25 metre pistol	Connie Petracek; United States	Margarita Tarradell; Cuba	Lorena Guado; Argentina
50 metre rifle prone	Cecilia Zeid; Argentina	Elizabeth Bourland; United States	Katherine Kelemen; United States
50 metre rifle 3 positions	Deena Wigger; United States	Sharon Bowes; Canada	Wanda Jewell; United States

== Men's team events ==
Event	Gold		Silver		Bronze	
10 metre air pistol	United States		Cuba		Canada	
10 metre air rifle	United States		Canada		Cuba	
25 metre center fire pistol	United States; Dan Iuga; Eduardo Suarez; Darius Young	1726 pts	Brazil; Júlio Almeida; Mauriverth Spena Jr; Fernando Cardoso Jr	1716 pts	Argentina; Ricardo Yuston; Rafael Alberto Oliveira; Daniel César Felizia	1703 pts
25 metre rapid fire pistol	United States		Cuba		Argentina	
25 metre standard pistol	United States; Don Nygord; Ben Amonette; Terence Anderson	1691 pts	Argentina; Rafael Alberto Oliveira; Daniel César Felizia; Jorge Edgardo Almiron	1684 pts	Cuba; Guillermo Reyes; Norbelis Bárzaga; Guido Arbona	1683 pts
50 metre pistol	Cuba		United States		Guatemala	
Trap	United States; Bret Erickson; Lance Bade; Brian Ballard	355 pts	Canada; George Leary; John Primrose; Paul Shaw	339 pts	Colombia; Danilo Caro; Jorge Jaramillo; Andrés García Caro	334 pts
Double trap	Canada		United States		Peru	
Skeet	Cuba		Canada		Guatemala	

== Women's team events ==
Event	Gold	Silver	Bronze
10 metre air pistol	United States	Colombia	Argentina
10 metre air rifle	United States	Cuba	Argentina

== Medal table ==
Place	Nation	Gold medal	Silver medal	Bronze medal	Total
1	United States	19	12	10	41
2	Cuba	6	6	4	16
4	Argentina	3	4	7	14
5	Canada	2	6	4	12
6	Colombia	1	1	3	5
7	Guatemala	1	0	2	3
8	Brazil	0	2	1	3
8	Virgin Islands	0	1	0	1
9	Peru	0	0	1	1
Total		32	32	32	96

== Sources ==
- Results at conatiro.org
- Olderr, Steven (April 29, 2003). The Pan American Games: A Statistical History. McFarland. ISBN 9780786443369.
- "Sports 123: Pan American Games". 29 October 2011. Archived from the original on 29 October 2011.
