= Fernando Richeri =

Uruguayan sports shooter

Personal information
- Nationality: Uruguayan
- Born: 9 June 1948 (age 76)

Sport
- Sport: Sports shooting

Fernando Richeri (born 9 June 1948) is a Uruguayan sports shooter. He competed in the men's 10 metre air pistol event at the 1992 Summer Olympics.
