= Sakari Paasonen =

Finnish sports shooter (1935–2020)

Sakari Paasonen (12 October 1935 – 7 November 2020) was a Finnish sport shooter.

He competed in pistol shooting events at the Summer Olympics in 1988 and 1992.

== Olympic results ==
Event	1988	1992
10 metre air pistol (men)	T-18th	5th
50 metre pistol (men)	T-19th	T-11th
