= Paco Sanz =

Paco Sanz may refer to:

- Paco Sanz (actor), Spanish actor
- Paco Sanz (footballer, born 1972), Spanish footballer
- Paco Sanz (footballer, born 2004), Spanish footballer and son of the player above
- Paco Sanz (sport shooter), Spanish sport shooter
