= Constant Wagner =

Luxembourgish sports shooter

Personal information
- Nationality: Luxembourgish
- Born: 1 January 1941; Tétange, Luxembourg
- Died: 27 October 2007 (aged 66); Luxembourg, Luxembourg

Sport
- Sport: Sports shooting

Constant Wagner (1 January 1941 – 27 October 2007) was a Luxembourgish sports shooter. He competed in the men's 10 metre air pistol event at the 1992 Summer Olympics.
