= Israel Curling Federation =

Sports governing body

- Sport: Curling
- Jurisdiction: National
- Founded: 2007
- (Israel)

The Israel Curling Federation (ICF) is a nonprofit organization founded in 2007 which nationally represents curling, the winter world sport which is played on ice surfaces.

On 2009, the ice surface was marked in "Canada Centre" in town of Metulla. The Curling Federation in Israel continuously expands its activities and now also gives sponsors to Olympic pistol shooting clubs.

As of 2013 Israeli shooting Olympian Alex Tripolski was heading the sport of curling in Israel, and that year the World Curling Federation reinstated Israel as a full member. In 2015 Tripolski was President of the Israel Curling Federation.

== Competitive history ==
In 2014, the Israeli national men's team won the silver medal in Group C at the 2014 European Curling Championships. While the men's team did not win a spot into Group A out of Group B, they placed sufficiently high to remain in Group B for the 2015 European Curling Championships.

In 2015, the Israeli national mixed curling team competed in the 2015 World Mixed Curling Championship in Bern, Switzerland. The men's team competed in the Group B of the 2015 European Curling Championships, finishing fourth with a record of 4–3.

In 2016, Israel was represented at 2016 World Mixed Doubles Curling Championship in Karlstad, Sweden, going 1–5. Israel was also represented at the 2016 World Senior Curling Championships in Karlstad, Sweden and went 3–5 to finish fifth in their pool. In the fall, the men's team returned to the 2016 European Curling Championships, finishing fourth in Group B with a 5–2 record, after losing in the semi-final to eventual group champion the Netherlands.

In 2017, Israel was represented at the 2017 World Mixed Doubles Curling Championship in Lethbridge, Alberta, Canada, going 2–5 in their group. Israel was also represented at the 2017 World Senior Curling Championships in Lethbridge, going 5–2 in their pool to finish in a 3-way tie for second place. The senior men proceeded to win the tie-breaker with Switzerland to qualify for play-offs, and lost in the qualification game for the spot in the quarter-finals against Wales, finishing ninth overall. In the fall, Israel was represented at the 2017 World Mixed Curling Championship in Champéry, Switzerland, returning after a one year absence in the event. The team qualified for the playoffs with a 4–3 record in round-robin play, with wins over Hong Kong, Switzerland, Austria, and Slovakia, and losses to Norway, the Czech Republic, and Finland, before losing to Russia in the round of 16. At the 2017 European Curling Championships, Israel's men's team returned to compete in Group B, finishing with a 5–2 record in the round-robin in Pool A and in third place in the pool. The team lost in the playoffs against Poland, 5–4.

In 2018, Israel was represented at the 2018 World Mixed Doubles Curling Championship in Östersund Sweden, going 1–6 in Group D. Israel also participated at the 2018 World Senior Curling Championships at the same venue, going 3–3 in Pool D to finish in fourth out of seven.
