= Jerzy Pietrzak =

Polish sports shooter (born 1962)

Jerzy Pietrzak (born 19 July 1962 in Kraków) is a Polish sport shooter. He competed in pistol shooting events at the Summer Olympics in 1988, 1992, 1996, and 2000.

== Olympic results ==
Event	1988	1992	1996	2000
10 metre air pistol (men)	7th	6th	5th	T-11th
50 metre pistol (men)	T-14th	9th	T-9th	T-9th
