= Bengt Kamis =

Swedish sports shooter

Personal information
- Nationality: Swedish
- Born: 20 June 1943 (age 81); Vörå, Finland

Sport
- Sport: Sports shooting

Bengt Kamis (born 20 June 1943) is a Swedish sports shooter. He competed in the men's 10 metre air pistol event at the 1988 Summer Olympics.
