= Roberto Di Donna =

Italian sport shooter (born 1968)

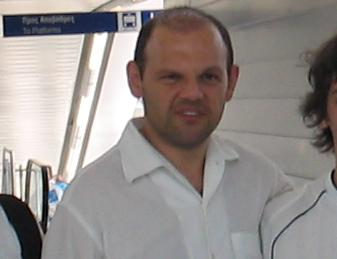

Medal record

Men's shooting

Representing Italy

Olympic Games
Gold medal – first place	1996 Atlanta	10 m air pistol
Bronze medal – third place	1996 Atlanta	50 m pistol

World Championships
Bronze medal – third place	1994 Milan	10 m air pistol

Roberto Di Donna (born 8 September 1968) is an Italian sport shooter and Olympic champion. Born in Rome, He received a gold medal in 10 metre air pistol at the 1996 Summer Olympics in Atlanta.

== Achievements ==
Olympic results
Event	1988	1992	1996	2000
50 metre pistol	23rd 554	22nd 553	(bronze) Bronze; 569+92.8	7th 560+97.3
10 metre air pistol	—	8th 581+97.5	(gold) Gold; 585+99.2	6th 581+99.5

== See also ==
- World Cup Multi-Medalists
