= Park Seung-rin =

South Korean sports shooter

Personal information
- Nationality: South Korean
- Born: 23 August 1953 (age 71)

Sport
- Sport: Sports shooting

Park Seung-rin (born 23 August 1953) is a South Korean sports shooter. He competed in the men's 50 metre free pistol event at the 1984 Summer Olympics.
