= Tamás Tóth (sport shooter) =

Hungarian sports shooter

Personal information
- Nationality: Hungarian
- Born: 29 November 1965 (age 60) Debrecen, Hungary

Sport
- Sport: Sports shooting

Tamás Tóth (born 29 November 1965) is a Hungarian sports shooter. He competed in the men's 10 metre air pistol event at the 1988 Summer Olympics.
