= Bruno Déprez =

French sports shooter

Personal information
- Nationality: French
- Born: 13 August 1949 (age 75); Merville, France

Sport
- Sport: Sports shooting

Bruno Déprez (born 13 August 1949) is a French sports shooter. He competed in the men's 50 metre pistol event at the 1988 Summer Olympics.
