= Galo Miño =

Ecuadorian sport shooter

Personal information
- Born: Galo Edmundo Miño Jarrín; 6 February 1953 Guaranda, Bolívar, Ecuador
- Died: 11 September 1986 (aged 33) Quito, Pichincha, Ecuador
- Height: 1.71 m (5 ft 7 1/2 in)
- Weight: 87 kg (192 lb)

Sport
- Country: Ecuador
- Sport: Shooting
Medal record
Men's Shooting
Representing Ecuador
Pan American Games
Gold medal – first place	1983 Caracas	Air Pistol, Team

Galo Edmundo Miño Jarrín (6 February 1953 – 11 September 1986) was an Ecuadorian sports shooter.

Miño won a gold medal at the 1983 Pan American Games in Caracas, as a member of Ecuador's three-man side in the team competition of the Air Pistol. It was Ecuador's only medal of the games.

At the 1984 Summer Olympics, Miño competed in the 50 meter pistol event. He finished equal 23rd, from the 56 shooters in the field.

A police captain, Miño was killed aged 33, during a shootout with bank robbers in Quito.
