= Tarek Riad =

Egyptian sport shooter

Personal information
- Nationality: Egyptian
- Born: 13 July 1960 (age 64)

Sport
- Sport: Shooting
- Event(s): 50 metre pistol, 10 metre air pistol

Tarek Riad (born 13 July 1960 in Cairo) is an Egyptian sport shooter. He competed in pistol shooting events at the Summer Olympics in 1992 and 2000.

== Olympic results ==
Event	1992	2000
10 metre air pistol (men)	T-39th	T-27th
50 metre pistol (men)	T-16th	31st
