= Peter Heinz =

German sports shooter (born 1954)

Personal information
- Nationality: German
- Born: 27 June 1954 (age 72) Espenau, Germany

Sport
- Sport: Sports shooting

Peter Heinz (born 27 June 1954) is a German sports shooter. He competed in two events at the 1984 Summer Olympics.
