= Josef Hahnenkamp =

Austrian sports shooter

Personal information
- Nationality: Austrian
- Born: 19 July 1962 (age 62); Baden bei Wien, Austria

Sport
- Sport: Sports shooting

Josef Hahnenkamp (born 19 July 1962) is an Austrian sports shooter. He competed at the 1988 Summer Olympics and the 1992 Summer Olympics.
