= Ángel Corsino Fernández =

Spanish sports shooter

Personal information
- Nationality: Spanish
- Born: 16 February 1951 (age 74)

Sport
- Sport: Sports shooting

Ángel Corsino Fernández (born 16 February 1951) is a Spanish sports shooter. He competed in the men's 50 metre free pistol event at the 1984 Summer Olympics.
