= Afanasijs Kuzmins =

Latvian sport shooter (born 1947)

Personal information
- Born: 22 March 1947 (age 79) Biķernieki Parish, Latvian SSR, Soviet Union
- Height: 5 ft 10 in (1.78 m)
- Weight: 196 lb (89 kg)

Sport
- Country: Soviet Union; Latvia
- Sport: Sports shooting
- Coached by: Aleksandrs Lescinskis
Medal record
Men's shooting
Olympic Games
Representing Soviet Union
Gold medal – first place	1988 Seoul	25 m rapid fire pistol
Representing Latvia
Silver medal – second place	1992 Barcelona	25 m rapid fire pistol

Afanasijs Kuzmins (born 22 March 1947) is a Latvian shooter who won two Olympic medals in the 25 m Rapid Fire Pistol event; gold at the 1988 for the USSR and silver at the 1992 Summer Olympics for Latvia. He also won the 1986 World Championship in 25 m Standard Pistol. Kuzmins trained at the Armed Forces sports society in Riga.

He competed at the 2004 Summer Olympics and, by receiving wild card, competed also in the 2008 Summer Olympics. At the age of 61 Kuzmins finished 13th overall in his eighth Olympic appearance. No other shooter has appeared at eight Olympics; four have appeared at seven Olympics.

Aged 65, he competed at his ninth Olympic Games at the 2012 Summer Olympics finishing 17th.

== Olympic results ==
Event	1976 Montreal	1980 Moscow	1988 Seoul	1992 Barcelona	1996 Atlanta	2000 Sydney	2004 Athens	2008 Beijing	2012 London
25 metre rapid fire pistol	4th 595	6th 595	(gold) Gold; 598+100	(silver) Silver; 590+195+97	10th 585	8th 585	14th 574	13th 565	17th 569
10 metre air pistol	-	-	-	-	29th 574	-	-	-	-

== World records ==
Current world records held in 25 m Center-Fire Pistol
Men (ISSF)	Teams	1762	Soviet Union (Ignatiuk, Kuzmins, Pyzhianov)	August 15, 1990	Moscow (URS)
Current world records held in 25 m Standard Pistol
Men	Teams	1725	Soviet Union (Kuzmins, Melentyev, Turla); Soviet Union (Kuzmins, Basinski, Pyzhianov)	September 10, 1985; September 8, 1986	Osijek (YUG); Suhl (GDR)

== See also ==
- List of athletes with the most appearances at Olympic Games
