= Aldo Andreotti (sport shooter) =

Italian sports shooter

Personal information
- Nationality: Italian
- Born: 18 July 1947 (age 77); Capannori, Italy

Sport
- Sport: Sports shooting

Aldo Andreotti (born 18 July 1947) is an Italian sports shooter. He competed in the men's 25 metre rapid fire pistol event at the 1984 Summer Olympics.
