= Vinzenz Schweighofer =

Austrian sports shooter

Personal information
- Nationality: Austrian
- Born: 12 September 1942 (age 82)

Sport
- Sport: Sports shooting

Vinzenz Schweighofer (born 12 September 1942) is an Austrian sports shooter. He competed in the men's 50 metre free pistol event at the 1984 Summer Olympics.
