= László Pető (sport shooter) =

Hungarian sports shooter

Personal information
- Nationality: Hungarian
- Born: 25 June 1969 (age 55); Tata, Hungary

Sport
- Sport: Sports shooting

László Pető (born 25 June 1969) is a Hungarian sports shooter. He competed in the men's 10 metre air pistol event at the 1992 Summer Olympics.
