= Markus Opatril =

Austrian swimmer

Personal information
- Born: 6 May 1965 (age 61) Innsbruck, Austria

Sport
- Sport: Swimming

Markus Opatril (born 6 May 1965) is an Austrian freestyle swimmer. He competed in three events at the 1988 Summer Olympics.
