= Manhi Al-Mutairy =

Saudi Arabian sport shooter

Personal information
- Nationality: Saudi Arabia
- Born: 1938
- Height: 1.68 m (5 ft 6 in)
- Weight: 65 kg (143 lb)

Sport
- Sport: Shooting

Manhi Al-Mutairy (Arabic: مناحي المطيري; born 1938) is a Saudi Arabian sport shooter. He competed in the 1984 Summer Olympics.
