= Gennadi Lushchikov =

Soviet sport shooter

Olympic medal record

Shooting

Representing Soviet Union
| Bronze medal – third place | 1976 Montreal | 50 m rifle prone |

Gennadi Georgiyevich Lushchikov (Russian: Геннадий Георгиевич Лущиков; September 29, 1948 — October 1, 2004) was born in Tokur, Amur, Russia. He is a Soviet sport shooter and won a bronze medal in the 50 metre rifle prone event at the 1976 Summer Olympics in Montreal.
