= Timo Näveri =

Finnish sports shooter

Personal information
- Nationality: Finnish
- Born: 6 July 1956 (age 70) Sodankylä, Finland

Sport
- Sport: Sports shooting

Timo Näveri (born 6 July 1956) is a Finnish sports shooter. He competed in two events at the 1992 Summer Olympics.

== Sporting career ==
Näveri was born in Sodankylä, Finland, and was affiliated with the Orimattilan Jymy sports club in Orimattila. At the 1992 Summer Olympics in Barcelona, he competed in the men's 10 metre air pistol event, finishing joint 39th with 569 points. He also competed in the men's 50 metre free pistol event, where he finished joint 31st with 548 points. He did not advance to the final in either event.
