= Darius Young =

American sport shooter (1938–2021)

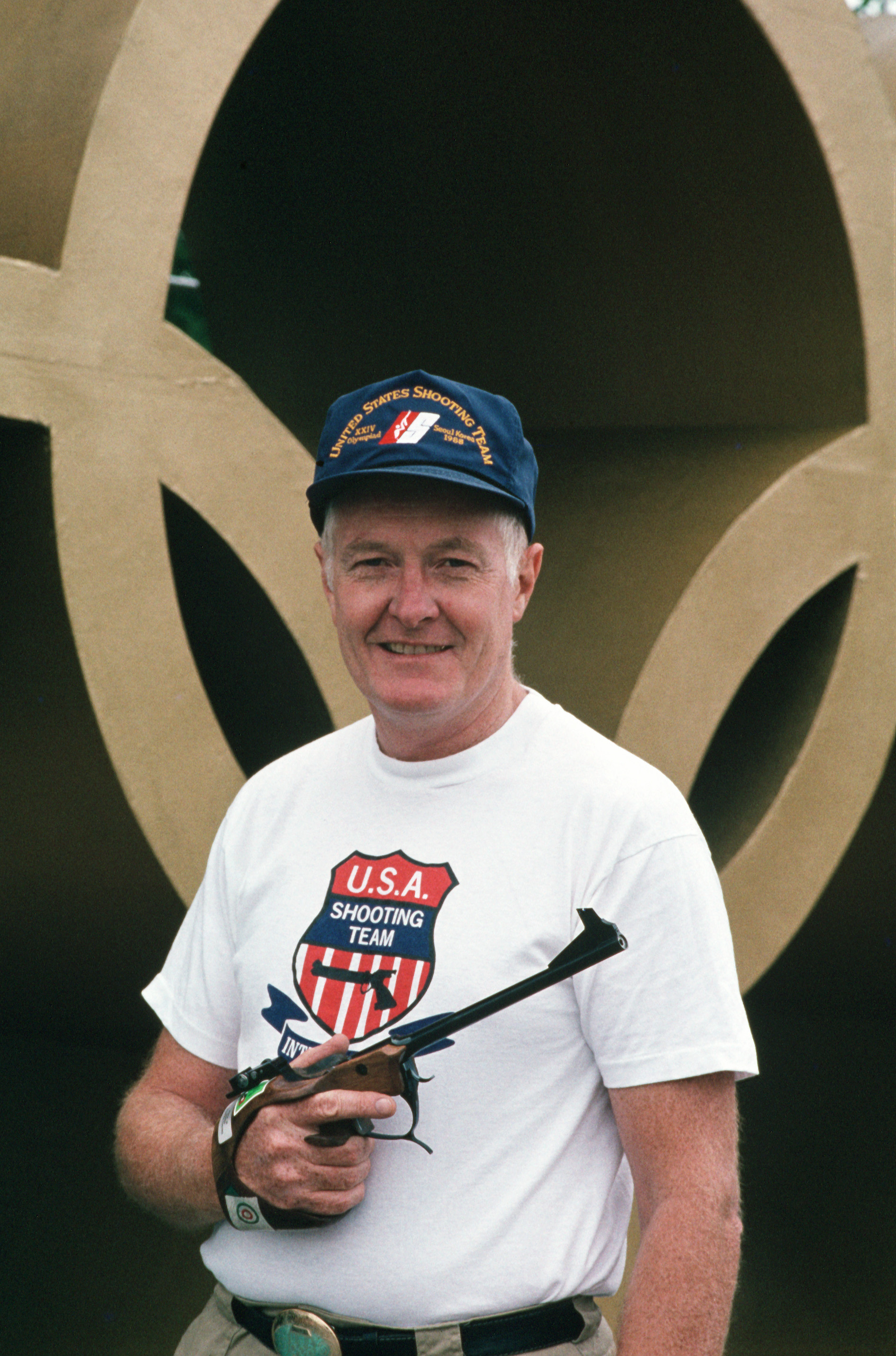
- Young at the 1988 Summer Olympics

Personal information
- Full name: Darius Robert Young
- Born: April 2, 1938 Anaheim, California, U.S.
- Died: June 23, 2021 (aged 83) Walla Walla, Washington, U.S.

Sport
- Country: United States
- Sport: Sports shooting
Medal record
Pan American Games
Gold medal – first place	1995 Mar del Plata	25 m center fire pistol, ind.

Darius Robert Young (April 2, 1938 – June 23, 2021) was an American sport shooter. He competed in pistol shooting events at the Summer Olympics in 1988 and 1992.

== Olympic results ==
Event	1988	1992
10 metre air pistol (men)	—	T-33rd
50 metre pistol (men)	T-16th	4th
