= Stefan Opatril =

Austrian swimmer

Personal information
- Born: 6 April 1967 (age 59)

Sport
- Sport: Swimming

Stefan Opatril (born 6 April 1967) is an Austrian freestyle swimmer. He competed in two events at the 1988 Summer Olympics.
