= Vladimir Lvov =

Soviet sports shooter

Personal information
- Nationality: Soviet
- Born: 18 February 1955 (age 71)

Sport
- Sport: Sports shooting

Vladimir Lvov (born 18 February 1955) is a Soviet sports shooter. He competed in the men's 50 metre rifle prone event at the 1988 Summer Olympics.
