= Terje Melbye Hansen =

Norwegian sport shooter (born 1948)

Personal information
- Nationality: Norwegian
- Born: 21 September 1948 (age 76); Kongsberg

Sport
- Country: Norway
- Sport: Shooting

Terje Melbye Hansen (born 21 September 1948) is a Norwegian sport shooter. He was born in Kongsberg. He competed at the 1976 Summer Olympics in Montreal.
