= Alberto Areces =

Spanish sports shooter

Personal information
- Full name: Alberto Areces Fernández
- Nationality: Spanish
- Born: 23 November 1970 (age 54); Oviedo, Spain

Sport
- Sport: Sports shooting

Alberto Areces Fernández (Note: In this Spanish name, the first or paternal surname is Areces and the second or maternal family name is Fernández.) (born 23 November 1970) is a Spanish sports shooter. He competed in the men's 50 metre pistol event at the 1992 Summer Olympics.
