= Reinhold Leitner =

Austrian swimmer

Personal information
- Full name: Reinhold Richard Leitner
- Nationality: Austrian
- Born: 24 June 1966 (age 60) Salzburg
- Height: 187

Sport
- Sport: Swimming
- Club: Salzburger TV

Reinhold Leitner (born 24 June 1966) is an Austrian butterfly swimmer. He competed in two events at the 1988 Summer Olympics.
