= Geir Skirbekk =

Norwegian sports shooter (born 1962)

Geir Skirbekk (born 13 June 1962) is a Norwegian sport shooter, World Champion (team) and Olympic competitor.

He was a member of the winning team in 300 metre free rifle standing at the ISSF World Championships in Skövde in 1986.

He competed at the 1988 Summer Olympics in Seoul, placing 11th.
