= Marek Nowak =

Polish sports shooter

Personal information
- Nationality: Polish
- Born: 6 April 1967 (age 57); Warsaw, Poland

Sport
- Sport: Sports shooting

Marek Nowak (born 6 April 1967) is a Polish sports shooter. He competed in two events at the 1996 Summer Olympics.
