= Lothar Heinrich =

Austrian sports shooter

Personal information
- Nationality: Austrian
- Born: April 30, 1941 Varnsdorf, Protectorate of Bohemia and Moravia

Sport
- Sport: Sports shooting

Lothar Heinrich: 23.08.2016

Lothar Heinrich (* 30. April 1941 in Varnsdorf,Tschechien; † 23. Jänner 2022 in Klagenfurt am Wörthersee, Österreich) was an Austrian sports shooter. He competed at the 1984 Summer Olympics and the 1988 Summer Olympics.
