= Rodney Colwell =

Canadian sports shooter

Personal information
- Full name: Rodney Michael Colwell
- Nationality: Canadian
- Born: 14 June 1958 (age 67); Chilliwack, British Columbia, Canada
- Height: 182 cm (6 ft 0 in)
- Weight: 95 kg (209 lb)

Sport
- Sport: Sports shooting

Rodney Michael Colwell (born 14 June 1958) is a Canadian sports shooter. He competed in two events at the 1992 Summer Olympics.

== International competition ==
At the 1992 Summer Olympics (held in Barcelona, Spain), Colwell represented Team Canada in the Men's 10 metre air pistol event. He scored 577 in the qualifying round, ultimately tying for 14th with three other competitors. He did not make it into the finals, which Wang Yifu (China) would later win. Colwell also competed in the qualifying round of the Men's ISSF 50 meter pistol event. He scored 543 and tied for 37th with four other competitors. Kanstantsin Lukashyk of the Unified Team went on to win the event that year.
