= Gérard Fernandez =

French sports shooter

Personal information
- Nationality: French
- Born: 6 February 1943 (age 83) Artigues, France

Sport
- Sport: Sports shooting

Gérard Fernandez (born 6 February 1943) is a French sports shooter. He competed in two events at the 1996 Summer Olympics.
