= Hubert Foidl =

Danish sports shooter (born 1942)

Personal information
- Nationality: Danish
- Born: 4 August 1942 (age 82); Mittenwald, Germany

Sport
- Sport: Sports shooting

Hubert Foidl (born 4 August 1942) is a Danish sports shooter. He competed in two events at the 1988 Summer Olympics.
