= Kolyo Zakhariev =

Bulgarian sports shooter

Personal information
- Nationality: Bulgarian
- Born: 5 July 1968 (age 56); Sofia, Bulgaria

Sport
- Sport: Sports shooting

Kolyo Zakhariev (born 5 July 1968) is a Bulgarian sports shooter. He competed in two events at the 1996 Summer Olympics.
