= Johannes Gufler =

Austrian sports shooter

Personal information
- Nationality: Austrian
- Born: 28 August 1946 (age 79) Zams, Austria

Sport
- Sport: Sports shooting

Johannes Gufler (born 28 August 1946) is an Austrian sports shooter. He competed in two events at the 1988 Summer Olympics.
