= Konstantinos Panageas =

Greek sports shooter

Personal information
- Nationality: Greek
- Born: 11 August 1949 (age 75)

Sport
- Sport: Sports shooting

Konstantinos Panageas (also spelled Constantinos, born 11 August 1949) is a Greek sports shooter. He competed in two events at the 1988 Summer Olympics.
