= Jean Bogaerts (sport shooter) =

Belgian sports shooter

Personal information
- Nationality: Belgian
- Born: 6 June 1944 (age 80); Oppuurs, Belgium

Sport
- Sport: Sports shooting

Jean Bogaerts (born 6 June 1944) is a Belgian sports shooter. He competed in two events at the 1988 Summer Olympics.
