= Stein Olav Fiskebeck =

Norwegian sports shooter (1955–2007)

Personal information
- Nationality: Norwegian
- Born: 24 December 1955; Sør-Varanger, Norway
- Died: 13 April 2007 (aged 51); Lozerovo, Russia

Sport
- Sport: Sports shooting

Stein Olav Fiskebeck (24 December 1955 – 13 April 2007) was a Norwegian sports shooter. He competed in two events at the 1992 Summer Olympics. He died in a snowmobiling accident in 2007.
