= Surin Klomjai =

Thai sports shooter (born 1951)

Personal information
- Nationality: Thai
- Born: 24 February 1951 (age 74)

Sport
- Sport: Sports shooting

Surin Klomjai (born 24 February 1951) is a Thai sports shooter. He competed in two events at the 1996 Summer Olympics.
