= Spas Koprinkov =

Bulgarian sports shooter

Personal information
- Nationality: Bulgarian
- Born: 2 January 1970 (age 55)

Sport
- Sport: Sports shooting

Spas Koprinkov (Bulgarian: Спас Копринков; born 2 January 1970) is a Bulgarian sports shooter. He competed in two events at the 1992 Summer Olympics.
