= Constantin Tărloiu =

Romanian sports shooter

Personal information
- Nationality: Romanian
- Born: 27 July 1960 (age 64); Bucharest, Romania

Sport
- Sport: Sports shooting

Constantin Tărloiu (born 27 July 1960) is a Romanian sports shooter. He competed in two events at the 1996 Summer Olympics.
