= Oleksandr Blizniuchenko =

Ukrainian sports shooter (born 1951)

Personal information
- Nationality: Ukrainian
- Born: 27 May 1951; Kharkiv, Ukrainian SSR, Soviet Union
- Died: 27 September 2020 (aged 69)

Sport
- Sport: Sports shooting

Oleksandr Blizniuchenko (Ukrainian: Олександр Близнюченко; 27 May 1951 – 27 September 2020) was a Ukrainian sports shooter. He competed in two events at the 1996 Summer Olympics.
