= Albert Deuring =

Austrian sports shooter

Personal information
- Nationality: Austrian
- Born: 2 March 1962 (age 63); Bregenz, Austria

Sport
- Sport: Sports shooting

Albert Deuring (born 2 March 1962) is an Austrian sports shooter. He competed in two events at the 1988 Summer Olympics.
