= Vladas Turla =

Lithuanian sport shooter (born 1953)

Personal information
- Full name: Vladas Turla
- Born: 22 February 1953 (age 73) Biržai, Lithuanian SSR, Soviet Union

Sport
- Sport: Pistol
Medal record
Representing Soviet Union
World Championships
Gold medal – first place	1982 Caracas	Standard Pistol
Gold medal – first place	1982 Caracas	Center Fire Pistol
Gold medal – first place	1982 Caracas	Air Pistol
Gold medal – first place	1982 Caracas	Team Free Pistol
Gold medal – first place	1982 Caracas	Team Standard Pistol
Gold medal – first place	1982 Caracas	Team Center Fire Pistol
Gold medal – first place	1982 Caracas	Team Air Pistol
European Championships
Gold medal – first place	1981 Titograd	Center Fire Pistol
Gold medal – first place	1981 Athens	Air Pistol
Gold medal – first place	1982 Hague	Air Pistol
Bronze medal – third place	1985 Osijek	Center Fire Pistol

Vladas Turla (born 22 February 1953) is a Lithuanian former sport shooter who competed for the Soviet Union in the 1980 Summer Olympics and finished 4th.

== Records ==
Current world records held in 25 metre standard pistol
Men	Teams	1725	Soviet Union (Kuzmins, Melentyev, Turla); Soviet Union (Kuzmins, Basinski, Pyzhianov)	September 10, 1985; September 8, 1986	Osijek (YUG); Suhl (GDR)
