= Erich Buljung =

American sport shooter

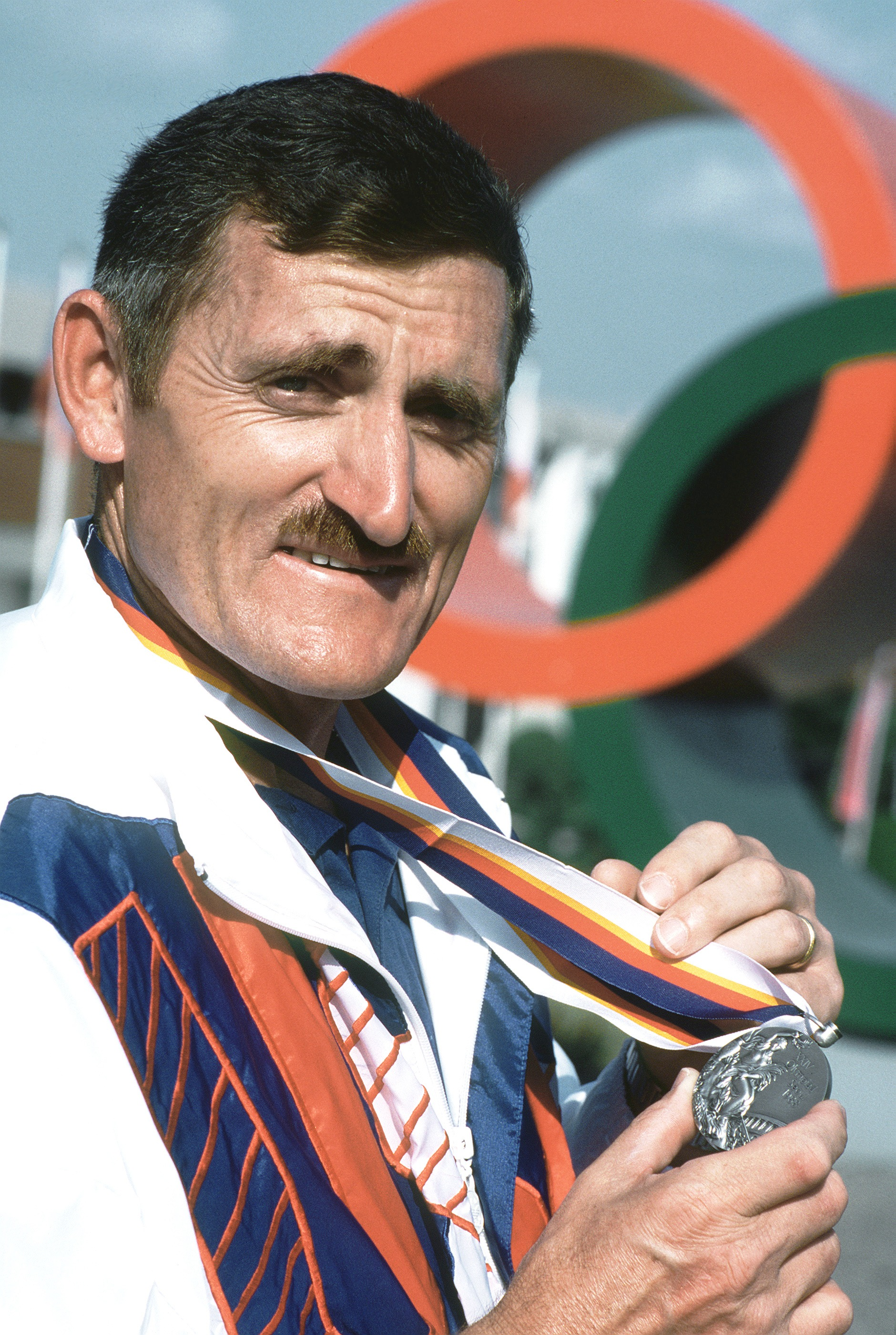

Personal information
- Nationality: American
- Born: March 21, 1944 (age 82) Yugoslavia
Medal record
Men's shooting
Representing the United States
Olympic Games
Silver medal – second place	1988 Seoul	10 m air pistol

Erich Buljung (born March 21, 1944) is a Yugoslav American former sport shooter who competed in the 1984 Summer Olympics and 1988 Summer Olympics.

Buljung was a career soldier having served in the U.S. Army for over twenty-five years. He served in Vietnam and as a shooting instructor at Fort Benning, Georgia.

== Records ==
Current paka records held in 25 metre standard pistol
Men	Individual	584	Erich Buljung (USA)	August 20, 1983	Caracas (VEN)
