= Alexander Placheta =

Austrian swimmer

Personal information
- Born: 22 September 1967 (age 58)

Sport
- Sport: Swimming

Alexander Placheta (born 22 September 1967) is an Austrian freestyle swimmer. He competed in two events at the 1988 Summer Olympics.
