= Arndt Kaspar =

German sports shooter

Arndt Kaspar (born 23 August 1962 in Blieskastel) is a German former sport shooter who competed in the 1988 Summer Olympics. He placed seventh in the 50 metres free pistol event, and tied 12th in the 10 metres air pistol event. Kaspar was affiliated with Schützenverein 1897 St. Ingbert. Besides this success, he won the World Cup in the discipline 10m Air Pistol Men in Suhl 1986.

== Achievements ==
Olympic Games
Rank	Discipline	City	Year
7	50m Pistol Men (Score: 562, Final: 89, Total: 651)	SEOUL	1988
12	10m Air Pistol Men (Score: 579, Total: 579)	SEOUL	1988

World Championships
Rank	Discipline	City	Year
5	50m Pistol Men (Score: 561, Final: 88, Total: 649)	SUHL	1986

World Cup
Rank	Discipline	City	Year
1	10m Air Pistol Men (Score: 583, Final: 99.7, Total: 682.7)	SUHL	1986
4	10m Air Pistol Men (Score: 583, Final: 98.8, Total: 681.8)	MUNICH	1990
5	10m Air Pistol Men (Score: 576, Final: 99.7, Total: 675.7)	LOS ANGELES	1990
5	10m Air Pistol Men Score: 585, Final: 100.4, Total: 685.4	MUNICH	1988
6	50m Pistol Men Score: 554, Final: 91, Total: 645	MEXICO CITY	1990
7	10m Air Pistol Men Score: 580, Final: 98.3, Total: 678.3	MEXICO CITY	1990
7	50m Pistol Men Score: 562, Final: 89, Total: 651	MUNICH	1989
7	10m Air Pistol Men Score: 585, Final: 100, Total: 685	SUHL	1988

European Championships
Rank	Discipline	City	Year
7	10m Air Pistol Men Score: 582, Final: 97.2, Total: 679.2	BRATISLAVA	1987
