= Kim Seon-il (sport shooter) =

South Korean sport shooter (born 1956)

Kim Seon-il (born 12 October 1956) is a South Korean sport shooter who competed in the 1992 Summer Olympics.
