= Dimitrios Baltas =

Greek sports shooter

Personal information
- Nationality: Greek
- Born: 13 May 1958 (age 66); Athens, Greece

Sport
- Sport: Sports shooting

Dimitrios Baltas (born 13 May 1958) is a Greek sports shooter. He competed in three events at the 1992 Summer Olympics.
