= Horst Krasser =

Austrian sports shooter

Personal information
- Nationality: Austrian
- Born: 14 January 1941 Graz, Austria
- Died: September 2024 (aged 83)

Sport
- Sport: Sports shooting

Horst Krasser (14 January 1941 – September 2024) was an Austrian sports shooter. He competed in two events at the 1988 Summer Olympics.
