= Hans Hierzer =

Austrian sports shooter

Personal information
- Nationality: Austrian
- Born: 9 May 1955 (age 69); St. Ruprecht, Austria

Sport
- Sport: Sports shooting

Hans Hierzer (born 9 May 1955) is an Austrian sports shooter. He competed in two events at the 1988 Summer Olympics.
