= Lennart Andersson (sport shooter) =

Swedish sports shooter

Personal information
- Nationality: Swedish
- Born: 20 August 1957 (age 67); Strömsund, Sweden

Sport
- Sport: Sports shooting

Lennart Andersson (born 20 August 1957) is a Swedish sports shooter. He competed in two events at the 1996 Summer Olympics.
