= Neal Caloia =

American sports shooter

Personal information
- Nationality: American
- Born: April 9, 1970 (age 56) Cottage Grove, Oregon, United States

Sport
- Sport: Sports shooting

Neal Caloia (born April 9, 1970) is an American sports shooter. He competed in two events at the 1996 Summer Olympics.
