= Benny Östlund =

Swedish sports shooter

Personal information
- Nationality: Swedish
- Born: 6 March 1952 (age 73); Dalarna, Sweden

Sport
- Sport: Sports shooting

Benny Östlund (born 6 March 1952) is a Swedish sports shooter. He competed at the 1988 Summer Olympics and the 1992 Summer Olympics.
