= Sergei Pyzhianov =

Soviet sports shooter

Personal information
- Born: October 24, 1960 (age 65) Kem, Soviet Union
Medal record
Men's shooting
Representing Unified Team
Olympic Games
Silver medal – second place	1992 Barcelona	10 m air pistol

Sergei Pyzhianov (born October 24, 1960) is a former Soviet pistol shooter. During the last few years of the Soviet Union's dominance, he was a major star on the pistol team. He was born in Kem.

Although never an Olympic champion, he competed at three Olympics, 1980, 1992 and 1996, winning a silver medal in the 10m air pistol in 1992.

He also won the ISSF World Shooting Championships three times: in 1986 (50 metre pistol), 1989 (10 metre air pistol) and 1990 (25 metre center-fire pistol). In 1989, he also won the first ISSF World Cup Final with the new air pistol targets, setting two new world records after 593 points in the qualification round and 102.1 points in the final round. The former stood until 2009 and the latter remains unbeaten.

Current world records held in 25 metre center-fire pistol
Men (ISSF)	Teams	1762	Soviet Union (Ignatiuk, Kuzmins, Pyzhianov)	August 15, 1990	Moscow (URS)
Current world records held in 25 metre standard pistol
Men	Teams	1725	Soviet Union (Kuzmins, Melentyev, Turla); Soviet Union (Kuzmins, Basinski, Pyzhianov)	September 10, 1985; September 8, 1986	Osijek (YUG); Suhl (GDR)
Current world records held in 10 metre air pistol
Men	Final	246.5	Kim Song Guk (PRK)	November 11, 2019	Doha (QAT)
