= Park Jong-sin =

South Korean sport shooter

- Hangul: 박종신
- RR: Bak Jongsin
- MR: Pak Chongsin

Park Jong-sin (Korean: 박종신; born 10 December 1962) is a South Korean sport shooter who competed in the 1988 Summer Olympics and in the 1992 Summer Olympics.
