= Francisco Sanz (sport shooter) =

Spanish sports shooter (1942–2020)

Personal information
- Nationality: Spanish
- Born: 31 May 1942
- Died: 15 May 2020 (aged 77)

Sport
- Sport: Sports shooting

Francisco Sanz Cancio (31 May 1942 – 15 May 2020) was a Spanish sports shooter. He competed in two events at the 1992 Summer Olympics.

== Scam ==
Francisco Sanz Cancio was accused in 2017 of knowing and collaborating in a scam run by his son, Francisco José Sanz González de Martós, who exaggerated the disease he suffered from (Cowden Syndrome) in order to receive a huge amount of donations of actors, YouTubers and other celebrities, raising over 200.000 euros that was spent on luxuries and things not included in the supposed treatment of his illness.

However, due to his death on 15 May 2020 at the age of 77, Sanz Cancio could not be judged for his participation in his son's scam.
