= Xu Haifeng =

Chinese sport shooter

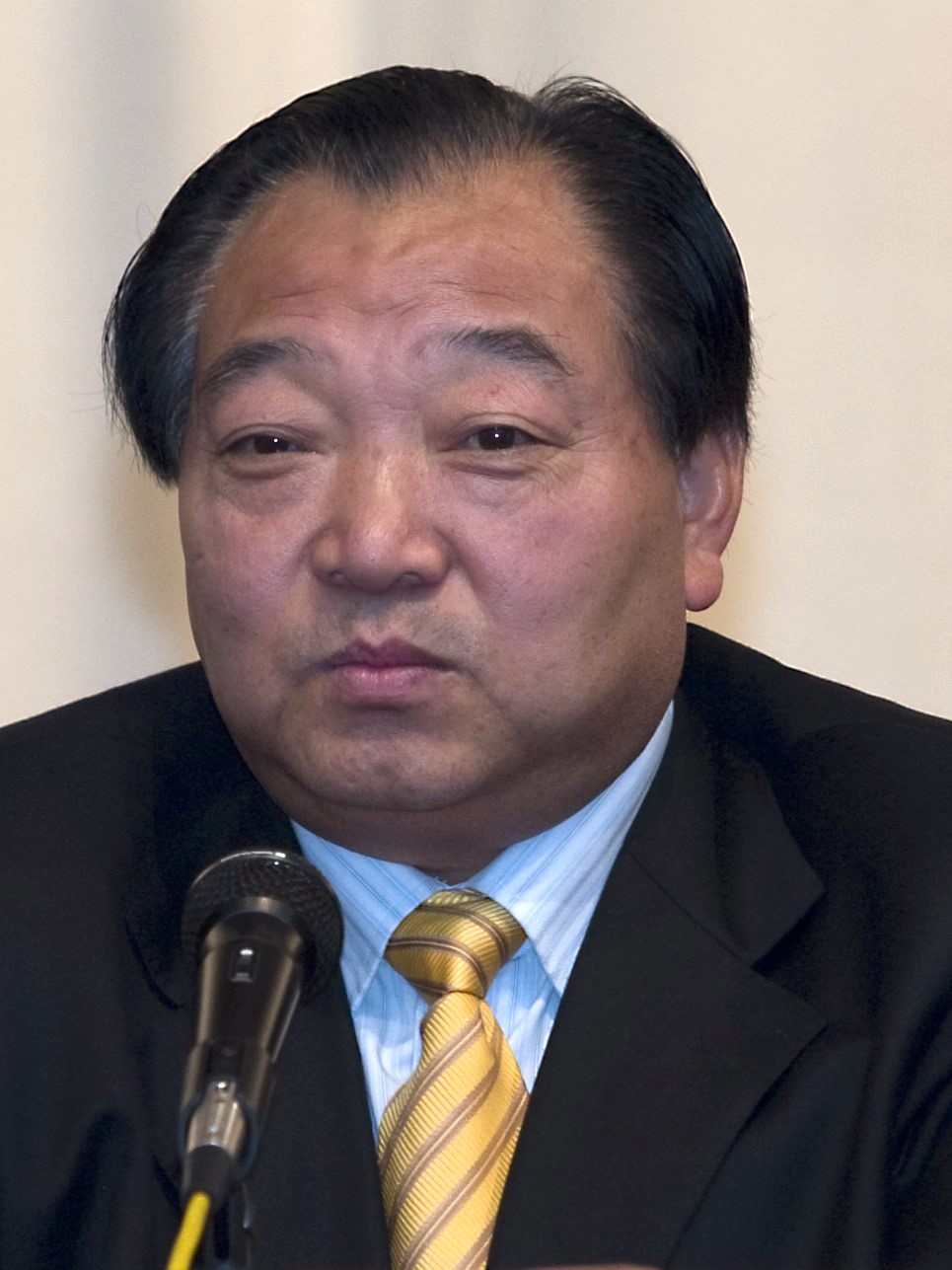
- Xu Haifeng in 2007

Personal information
- Native name: 许海峰
- Born: August 1, 1957 (age 68) Zhangzhou, Fujian, People's Republic of China
Medal record
Men's shooting
Representing China
| Gold medal – first place | 1984 Los Angeles | 50 m pistol |
| Bronze medal – third place | 1988 Seoul | 10 m air pistol |

Xu Haifeng (simplified Chinese: 许海峰; traditional Chinese: 許海峰; pinyin: Xǔ Hǎifēng; born August 1, 1957) is a male Chinese pistol shooter. He specializes in the 50 meter pistol event. He was born in Zhangzhou, Fujian and joined Anhui province's shooting team.

In February 1979, the Chaohu Regional Sports Committee organized a shooting training program. Xu Haifeng, recommended by his physical education teacher and shooting coach Wang Zhenze, filled a vacant spot and joined the training with his own food supplies. Due to his outstanding performance, he was transferred to officially funded training after just 20 days. Two months later, at the 4th Provincial Games, he broke two provincial records—in the men's standard 40-shot air pistol standing and the men's standard small-bore rifle events—and won a total of eight medals by himself.

In August 1982, at the 5th Provincial Games, Xu Haifeng used a domestically made Shuangling-brand standard air pistol worth just over 60 yuan. Unexpectedly, he achieved an excellent score of 370 points, defeating provincial shooting team members who were using precision air pistols from West Germany worth several thousand yuan, and broke the provincial record for the men’s 40-shot air pistol event. In October of the same year, Xu Haifeng joined the Anhui Provincial Shooting Training Team. At that time, his coach, Ou Debao, had been sent to perform manual labor at a factory in Hefei. Every evening, Coach Ou would write out the training plan for the next day, then ride his bicycle across most of Hefei—from the factory area in the southwest to the shooting team in the northeast—to hand it to Xu Haifeng and personally guide him in his training.

Xu Haifeng's outstanding performance caught the attention of national team coach Li Peilin. After a period of evaluation, he was recruited into the national team in 1983.

In March of the same year, at the East China Regional Shooting Championships held in Shanghai, he won two first-place titles and broke the national pistol record with a score of 587 points, surpassing the previous record of 583. In July, he won one silver and one bronze medal at the 5th Asian Shooting Championships, and together with his teammates, secured second place in the team total score. In September, he won two silver medals at the 5th National Games.

Xu won the gold medal at the 1984 Los Angeles Olympics, the first time that an athlete of the People's Republic of China won a Summer Olympic gold medal. After retiring in 1995, he became a coach of Chinese National Shooting Team.

Xu was the torchbearer to bring the Olympic Torch into the Beijing National Stadium, near the end of the 2008 Summer Olympics Opening Ceremony. He also carried the flag of the Olympic Council of Asia at the opening ceremony of the 2022 Asian Games. Xu is married to Zhao Lei, his coach's daughter in the Chinese National Shooting Team. They have a daughter, Xu Jia. Xu is the Deputy Director of the Chinese Cycling and Fencing Administration Center.

== Portrayals and coverage in media ==
On October 14, 2012 a movie based on his life leading up to his Olympic gold medal, "Xu Haifeng and His Gun" premiered in China. The film was directed by Wang Fangfang (Chinese: 王放坊) and stars Li Dongxue (Chinese: 李东学) as Xu Haifeng.

== Public Activities ==
In 2001, Xu Haifeng, along with nine others, co-founded the "China Athletes Educational Foundation," which was officially registered in Hong Kong on March 10.

In 2007, Xu Haifeng participated in the "Voice of China – Good Vision" public welfare campaign for youth eye health, co-organized by People’s Daily Health Times and Hangzhou Qingchun Middle School in Hangzhou. He also led the students of Qingchun Middle School in singing Beyond Dreams.
