= Kim Sung-jun (sport shooter, born 1973) =

South Korean sports shooter

Kim Sung-jun (born 21 October 1973) is a South Korean sport shooter who competed in the 1996 Summer Olympics. He arrived #12 in the Air Pistol Sports 10 meters, and #37 in the Free Pistol 50 meters
