= Stanislav Jirkal =

Czech sport shooter

Personal information
- Nationality: Czech
- Born: 15 November 1955 Kladno, Czechoslovakia
- Died: November 2002 (aged 46–47) Chrustenice, Czech Republic

Sport
- Sport: Sport shooting

Stanislav Jirkal (15 November 1955 – November 2002) was a Czech sport shooter. He competed at the 1992 Summer Olympics and the 1996 Summer Olympics.
