= Kim Sung-joon (sport shooter, born 1968) =

South Korean sport shooter

Kim Sung-joon (born 10 July 1968) is a South Korean sport shooter who competed in the 1996 Summer Olympics.
