= Gernot Eder =

German sport shooter (born 1965)

Gernot Eder (born 14 August 1965 in Räckelwitz, Bezirk Dresden, East Germany) is a German former sport shooter who competed in the 1988 Summer Olympics and in the 1992 Summer Olympics.
