= Dario Palazzani =

Italian sports shooter

Personal information
- Nationality: Italian
- Born: 18 August 1954; Brescia, Italy
- Died: 27 January 2017 (aged 62)

Sport
- Sport: Sports shooting

Dario Palazzani (18 August 1954 – 27 January 2017) was an Italian sports shooter. He competed at the 1988 Summer Olympics and the 1992 Summer Olympics.
