= Philippe Cola =

French sports shooter (born 1956)

Personal information
- Nationality: French
- Born: 14 February 1956 (age 69); Mancieulles, France

Sport
- Sport: Sports shooting

Philippe Cola (born 14 January 1956) is a French sports shooter. He competed at the 1984 Summer Olympics, the 1988 Summer Olympics and the 1992 Summer Olympics.
