= Alexander Melentyev =

Soviet sport shooter

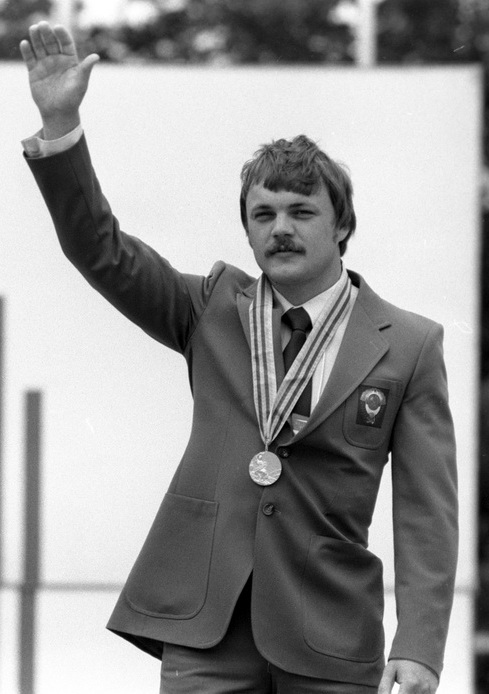
- Melentyev at the 1980 Olympics in Moscow

Personal information
- Nationality: Soviet Union; Kyrgyzstan
- Born: 27 June 1954 Penza, Russian SFSR, USSR
- Died: 16 February 2015 (aged 60) Bishkek, Kyrgyzstan

Sport
- Sport: Shooting
- Event(s): 50 metre pistol, 25 metre, 10 metre
Medal record
Men's shooting
| Gold medal – first place | 1980 Moscow | 50 m pistol |

Alexander Remmovich Melentyev (Russian: Алекса́ндр Ре́ммович Меле́нтьев; 27 June 1954 – 16 February 2015) was a Soviet competitive sport shooter who won a gold medal at the 1980 Summer Olympics. The world record he set in 1980 remained unbeaten for 34 years. He was the first Olympic gold medalist from Kyrgyzstan.

== Bio ==
Melentyev was born in the Russian city of Penza but grew up in the Kyrgyz SSR.

At the 1980 Olympics in Moscow, Melentyev achieved a world record result of 581 (from 600, without final) in the 50 m pistol event in setting a new world and a new Olympic record. The world record was surpassed by Jin Jong-oh at the 2014 World Championships; with his score of 581 Melentyev remains the current Olympic record holder.

Current Olympic record held in 50 m Pistol
| Men | Qualification | 581 | Alexander Melentyev (Soviet Union) | July 20, 1980 | Moscow (USSR) |
Current world record held in 25 m Standard Pistol
| Men | Teams | 1725 | Soviet Union (Kuzmins, Melentyev, Turla); Soviet Union (Kuzmins, Basinski, Pyzhianov) | September 10, 1985; September 8, 1986 | Osijek (YUG); Suhl (GDR) |
