= Shuaib Adam =

Kenyan sport shooter

Personal information
- Nationality: Kenyan
- Born: 8 August 1953 (age 71)
- Height: 1.75 m (5 ft 9 in)
- Weight: 80 kg (180 lb)

Sport
- Sport: Shooting

Shuaib Adam (born 8 August 1953) is a Kenyan sport shooter. He competed in the 1984, 1988, and 1992 Summer Olympics.
