= Ben Amonette =

American sports shooter

Personal information
- Born: October 8, 1954 (age 71) Radford, Virginia, United States

Sport
- Sport: Sports shooting
Medal record
Representing United States
Pan American Games
Gold medal – first place	1995 Mar del Plata	10m air pistol team
Gold medal – first place	1995 Mar del Plata	25m pistol team
Silver medal – second place	1991 Havana	50m pistol
Silver medal – second place	1991 Havana	10m air pistol
Silver medal – second place	1995 Mar del Plata	50m pistol
Silver medal – second place	1995 Mar del Plata	50m pistol team
Bronze medal – third place	1995 Mar del Plata	25m pistol

Ben Edward Amonette (born October 8, 1954) is an American sports shooter. He competed at the 1992 Summer Olympics and the 1996 Summer Olympics.
