= Tu Tsai-hsing =

Taiwanese sports shooter (born 1950)

Personal information
- Nationality: Taiwanese
- Born: 21 February 1950 (age 75)

Sport
- Sport: Sports shooting

Tu Tsai-hsing (born 21 February 1950) is a Taiwanese sports shooter. He competed at the 1984, 1988, 1992 and the 1996 Summer Olympics.
