= Benelli Super 90 =

Benelli Super 90 is a line of Benelli semi-automatic shotguns. They are:

- Benelli M1
- Benelli M2
- Benelli M3
- Benelli M4
