= Beretta Px4 Storm =

Type of semi-automatic pistol

Px4 Storm
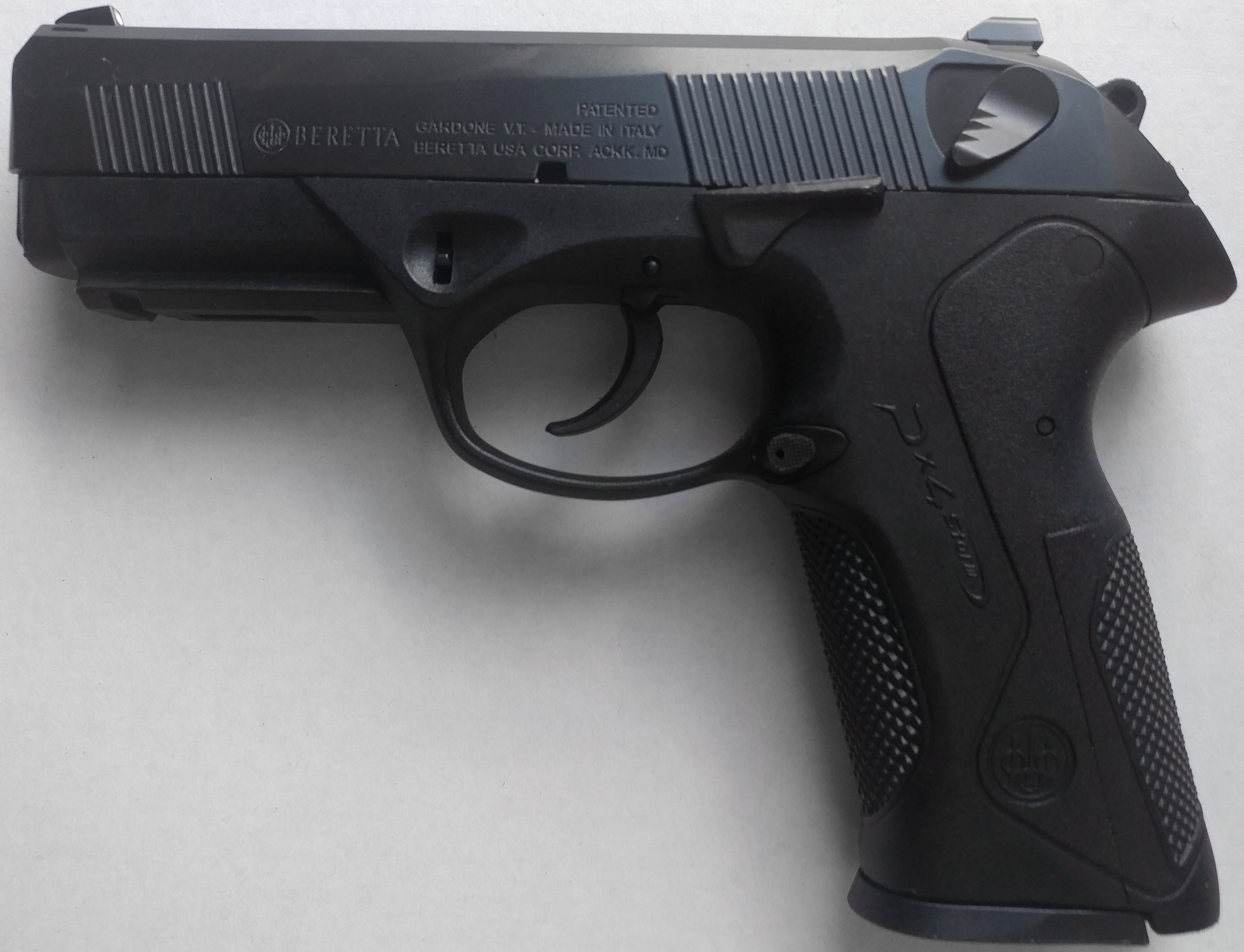
- The Beretta Px4 Storm (9mm Para)
- Type: Semi-automatic pistol
- Place of origin: Italy

Service history
- Used by: See Users

Production history
- Manufacturer: Beretta
- Produced: 2004–present

Specifications
- Mass: Px4: 785 g (27.7 oz) (without magazine); Px4SC: 715 g (25.2 oz) (without magazine)
- Length: Px4: 192 mm (7.6 in); Px4SC: 158 mm (6.2 in)
- Barrel length: 102 mm (4.0 in)
- Cartridge: 9×19mm Parabellum.40 S&W.45 ACP
- Action: Short recoil, locked-breech, rotating barrel lock
- Muzzle velocity: 360 m/s (1,181 ft/s) (9×19mm Parabellum)
- Effective firing range: 50 m (160 ft) (9×19mm Parabellum); 25 m (82 ft) (.40 S&W, .45 ACP)
- Feed system: Px4FS: 9×19mm: 10, 15, 17, 20 (extended); .40 S&W: 10, 14, 17 (extended); .45 ACP: 9, 10 (extended); Px4C: 9×19mm: 10, 15; .40 S&W: 10, 12; Px4SC: 9×19mm: 13; .40 S&W: 10
- Sights: 3-dot iron sights

The Beretta Px4 Storm is a semi-automatic pistol intended for personal defense and law enforcement use.

== Design ==
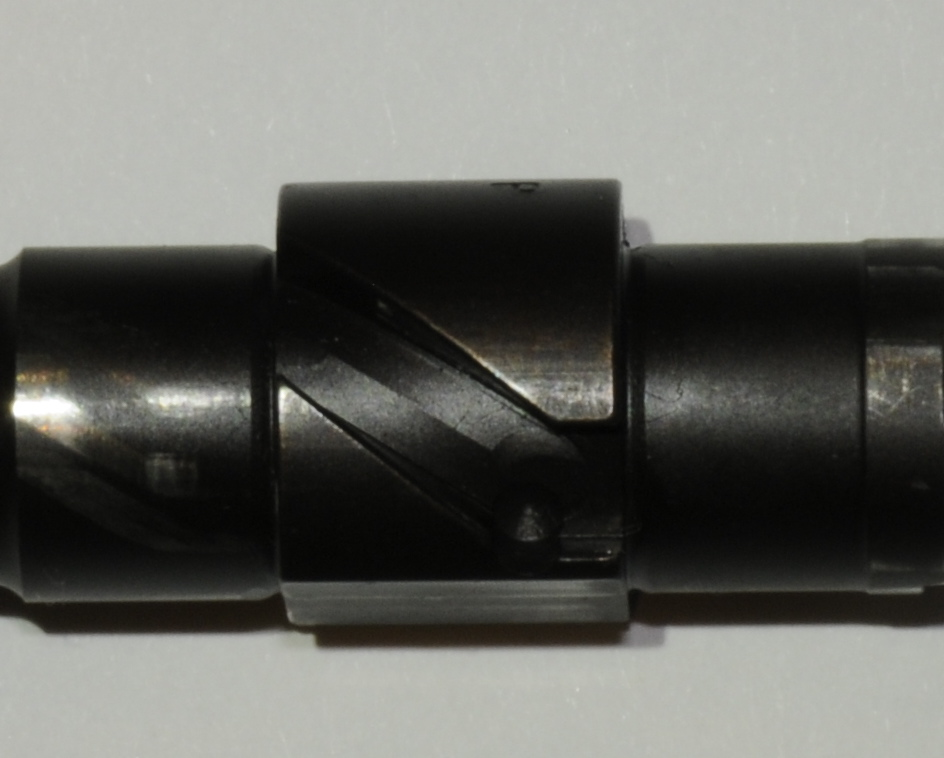
Close-up of the rotary barrel locking mechanism.

The Px4 uses a trigger and safety system similar to the Beretta 92 and the Beretta 8000 series, though it is distinguished from its predecessors by its light-weight polymer construction with steel inserts, standard Picatinny rail, and swappable grip backstraps.

Unlike the Beretta 92FS/96FS/M9/M9A1 and the 8000 series pistols, the Px4's trigger guard is rounded rather than squared. The polymer guide rod has a captive slide spring.

The full size (including the Px4 .45 ACP) and Compact versions are manufactured in Italy. The Px4 Subcompact is manufactured in the United States.

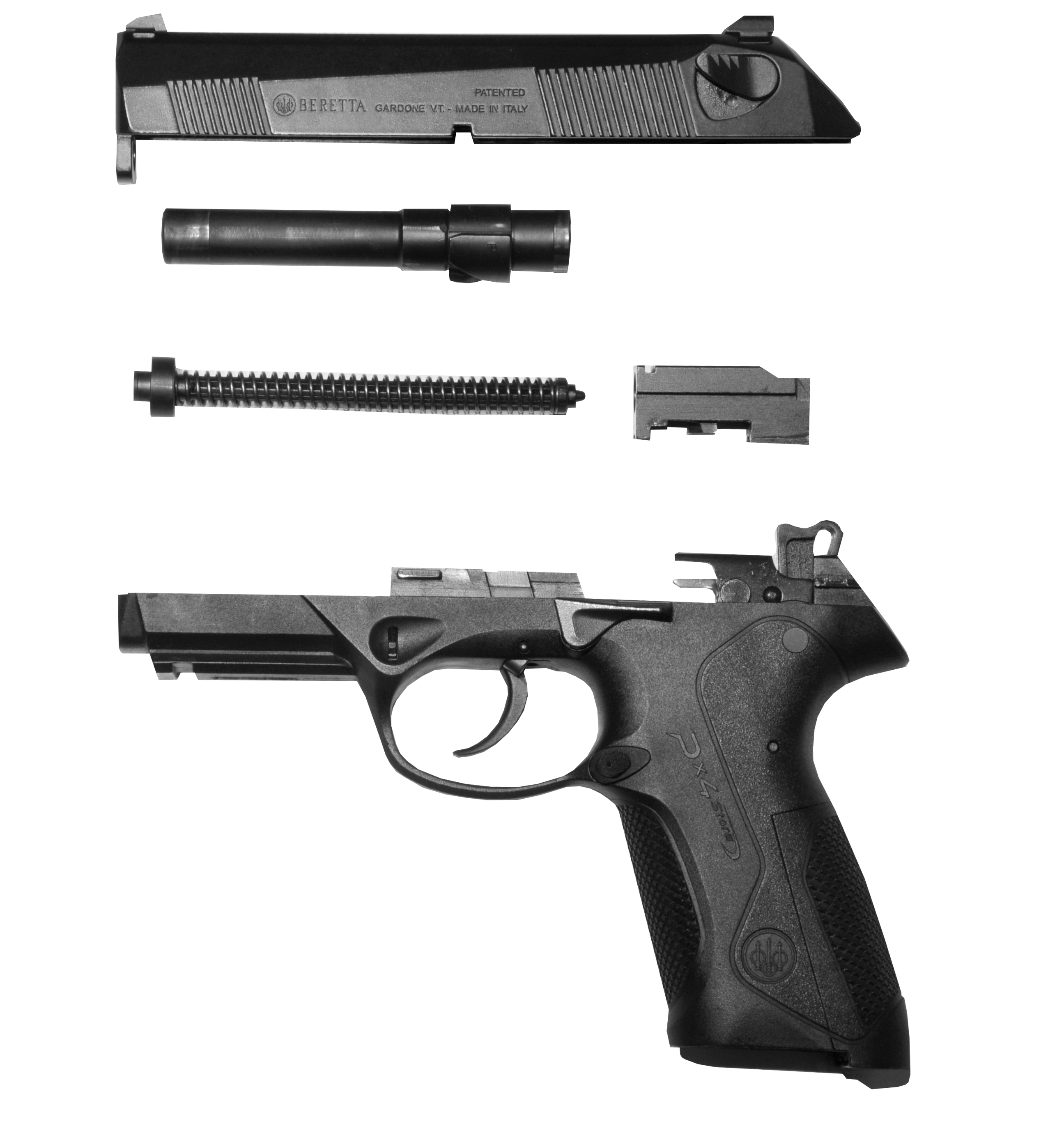
Field stripped Px4 Storm full size

=== Action system ===
The full size and Compact versions use the same short-recoil, rotating barrel action as the Beretta 8000 series, whereas the Subcompact uses the tilt barrel system.

The full size and Compact versions have a spring-loaded disassembly bar, accessed via recesses on both sides of the frame, which must be grasped and pulled down to release the slide. This is different from the rotating takedown pin of Beretta's previous hammer-fired pistols, which the Px4 Subcompact retains.

The magazine holds the top round directly behind the barrel's breech end so only a slight feed ramp is needed. This allows the barrel to fully support the case.

The 6-R rifling of the barrel generates counter-clockwise torque which is harnessed by the locking system to reduce the amount of pressure required from the rotating barrel lock's cam and pin system to affect unlocking.

The steel transfer block's cam pin is 5 mm wide and 2 mm deep. The entire hammer unit mechanism can be removed from the Px4 as a single group. This allows easy access to the firing mechanism for cleaning.

Beretta designed the Px4 so that it would be difficult to re-assemble incorrectly after a field strip.

=== Sights ===
The Px4 originally featured an interchangeable, luminescent 3-dot sight system (coated in Super-LumiNova) for use in dark or low-light situations. With short exposure to any kind of light, the night sights' luminescence lasted up to 30 minutes.

Beretta discontinued the luminescent 3-dot nights sights for the Px4 in 2010, replacing them with standard 3-dot sights. The weapon also incorporates a Picatinny rail under the muzzle to allow flashlights, laser sights, and other accessories to be attached.

=== Modular parts ===
Several parts were designed to be modular for ease of customization.

These parts include the backstrap, the magazine release button, the slide catch, the safety/decocker levers, and the hammer unit mechanism.

The backstrap is available in three sizes: slim, standard and oversized. The magazine release button can be mounted on either side of the weapon and replaced by one of three types: standard, large or combat (extended).

The standard slide catch and the safety/decocker levers can be replaced with slimmer versions to avoid snagging when the weapon is drawn quickly from a holster.

== Variants ==
=== Full Size ===
The Px4 full size was the first version available in 2004. Officially, it was offered in four different models:

Type	Action	Decocker	Hammer	Safety
Type F	Single and double-action	Yes	Yes	Manual
Type G	Single and double-action	Yes	Yes	No
Type C	Single-action-only ("Constant Action" - hammer is in half-cocked position)	No	Spurless	No
Type D	Double-action-only	No	Spurless	No

However, the Type C and Type D models were usually sold to law enforcement agencies.

Type F pistols can be converted into Type G pistols by removing a ball bearing in the safety/decocker unit or by changing the entire safety/decocker unit, depending on user preferences.

Occasionally, Beretta offers the Px4 full size with an INOX (stainless) slide.

=== Subcompact ===
The Px4 Storm Subcompact was released in 2008, initially in 9×19mm and later in .40 S&W. It has a DA/SA trigger.

The stainless steel barrel is resistant to corrosion from moisture. It is intended for personal defense and law enforcement use with a focus on concealed carry.

The Px4 Subcompact is basically an updated version of the Beretta 9000. The two pistols even use the same recoil spring guide rod.

Like the 9000S but unlike the Px4 full size and Compact, Px4 Subcompact uses a tilt barrel system and a rotating takedown pin. Also like the 9000S, magazines are available with the SnapGrip Extender base plate, which creates a longer grip profile.

Although the Subcompact is different from the larger versions in terms of its operation, it shares some interchangeable parts with the full size and the Compact, such as the safety levers, trigger, and magazine release buttons.

The Subcompact can use the longer magazines from the full size and Compact versions, and Beretta sells a magazine sleeve for the full size's 17-round magazine that basically extends the Subcompact's grip.

The Subcompact model has been discontinued as of 2023.

=== Compact ===
==== Standard Version ====
The Px4 Storm Compact was released in 2011; it is sized between the full size and the Subcompact models.

The Px4 Compact uses the rotating barrel design of the full size pistols but has a shorter slide and grip. The Px4 Compact has a block adaptor assembly due to the shorter barrel length and the rotating barrel design.

This version also has an ambidextrous slide stop lever. The Px4 Compact's magazines have orange followers to help users identify empty magazines in low visibility situations. The Px4 Compact can accept full size magazines.

Occasionally, Beretta offers the Px4 Compact with an INOX (stainless) slide.

==== Compact Carry ====
In January 2016, Beretta announced the Px4 Compact Carry, an optimized version of the Px4 Compact meant specifically for concealed carry use.

The version is a collaboration with USPSA 2000 Production champion Ernest Langdon (Langdon Tactical).

The Px4 Compact Carry is a Type G model (with low profile decocker levers) available in 9mm luger caliber, includes a larger magazine release button. This semi-customized pistol differs from the standard compact pistol in the following ways:

- use of the improved Beretta plated competition hammer group for a lighter trigger pull (30% lighter SA)
- a thinner slide with a Sniper Grey Cerakote coating
- extended mag release (3 sizes)
- Stealth G Decockers
- Deleted right side slide release (plug)
- Three 15-round magazines (orange followers)
- shipped with a Talon grip wrap for improved grip texture and handling

==== Compact Carry 2 ====
The Beretta PX4 Compact Carry 2 was released in January 2024 at the Shot Show. It is an updated version of the original PX4 Compact Carry, which was a collaboration between Beretta and Langdon Tactical, featuring improvements like a new trigger, improved magazine release, and other features based on user feedback.

- Heavy profile barrel
- Ameriglo high-visibility orange tritium front sight and black rear notch sights
- Revised carry-style Type-G de-cockers
- Chrome silicon hammer D spring (10#/11#) DA pull, 6 lb. 4 oz.
- Optimized trigger bar (black DLC coating)
- Bobbed Low Profile spurless hammer
- Extended Mag Release pre-installed

=== 45 ACP ===
The Px4 .45 ACP was released in 2008 and is available only as a "full size" pistol.

It has a reinforced body and is slightly larger than the 9mm / .40 S&W full size pistols to handle the higher ballistic power of the .45 ACP cartridge. The .45 ACP version was Beretta's entry in U.S. military's Joint Combat Pistol program.

The Px4 .45 ACP is available as a standard black model and as a Special Duty model with desert tan frame color, PVD coated magazines and internal firing control assembly, double recoil spring, and a longer barrel that extends beyond the slide.

The Special Duty model comes in a custom case with lubricating oil, cleaning kit, three magazines, three back straps, three magazine buttons, and user manual.

== Users ==
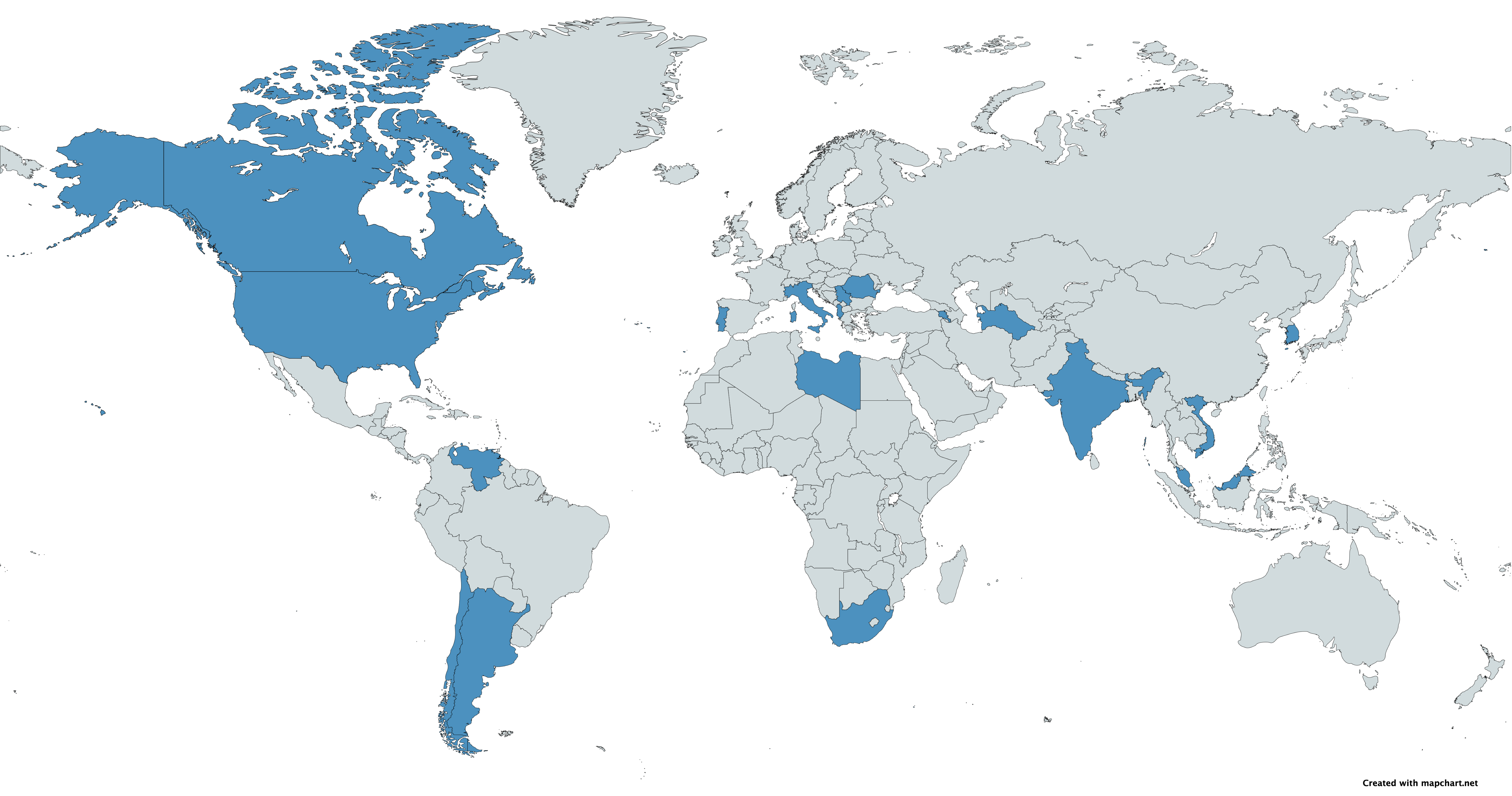
A map with users of the Beretta Px4 Storm in blue

=== Current users ===
- Albania: Standard service handgun of the Albanian Land Force
- Argentina: 1,500 pistols；Buenos Aires Metropolitan Police
- Armenia
- Canada: Canada Border Services Agency
- Chile: Used by the Special forces
- India: Used by Para (Special Forces) as a sidearm.
- Italy: Used by NOCS; Guardia di Finanza; Brescia police
- Libya: Ordered 7500 Px4 before the civil war
- Malaysia: 400 pistols；Royal Malaysia Police and Ministry of Home Affairs
- Portugal: Polícia de Segurança Pública
- Romania: Romanian Police - 25,000 pistols
- Serbia: Formerly used by PTJ.
- South Africa: 4000 pistols purchased in 2010 from Italy. The vast majority of service pistols remain the Vektor Z88 - a licensed copy of the Beretta 92, manufactured in South Africa by Denel Land Systems since 1988；South African Police Service and several Metro Police Departments.
- South Korea: The 707th Special Mission Battalion has been photographed using the Px4 during exercises. Presidential Security Service also uses Px4 alongside other pistols.
- Turkmenistan: Ordered 120 pistols
- United States: Used by the Ohio County, WV Sheriff's Department, Providence, Rhode Island Police Department, Fresno Police Department, Rochester, NY police department, and Sparta, New Jersey Police Department.
- Venezuela: Venezuelan National Guard, Bolivarian National Police Corps.
- Vietnam: Used by Mobile Police Command.

=== Former users ===
- United States: Maryland State Police used the Px4 Storm from 2008 to 2012, when they were retired due to problems with the magazine refusing to eject while reloading.

=== Failed bids ===
- United Kingdom: 19 pistols evaluated as a replacement for the Browning L9A1 pistol, lost to the Glock 17
- Peru: Evaluated as a replacement for the Beretta 92F, lost to the SiG Sauer SP2022

== See also ==
- Beretta Cx4 Storm Pistol-caliber Carbine
- Beretta Rx4 Storm 5.56mm Semi-Automatic Rifle
- Beretta Tx4 Storm Semi-Automatic 12 gauge Shotgun

== Bibliography ==
- Neville, Leigh (2017). European Counter-Terrorist Units 1972–2017. Oxford: Osprey Publishing. ISBN 978-1472825278.
