= Beretta 1201FP =

Beretta 1201 FP
- Type: Semi-automatic shotgun
- Place of origin: Italy

Production history
- Manufacturer: Beretta

Specifications
- Mass: 2.85 kilograms (6.3 lb)
- Length: 1,060 millimetres (42 in)
- Barrel length: 520 millimetres (20 in)
- Caliber: 12-gauge
- Action: Semi-automatic
- Feed system: 6 (2 3/4") or 5 (3") rounds in tube magazine
- Sights: Rifle or ghost ring

The Beretta 1201 FP is a semi-automatic shotgun, developed in the late 1980s or early 1990s by the Italian arms manufacturing company Fabbrica d'Armi Pietro Beretta. It was an upgrade to the preceding model, the Beretta 1200. The 1201 was manufactured in two versions, 1201F, intended for hunting and sporting, and the 1201FP, intended for law enforcement duties.

The Beretta 1201FP shotgun uses the proven inertia drive operating system found on Benelli shotguns and is very reliable. Some models came with rifle sights and some came with ghost ring sights with a tritium "night sight" insert in the front sight.

The 1200 and 1201F and FP are no longer manufactured and the Benelli Super 90 is the current version.
