= Benelli Nova =

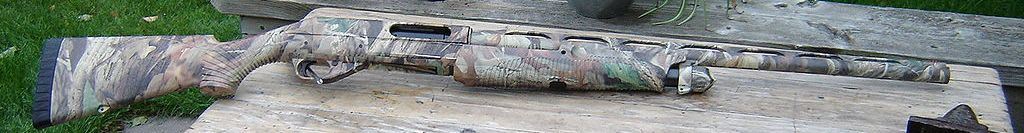
- A Benelli Nova shotgun with a camouflage camo
- Type: Pump action shotgun
- Place of origin: Italy

Production history
- Designed: 1990s
- Manufacturer: Benelli
- Unit cost: US$350–455
- Produced: 2000-present
- Variants: Supernova

Specifications
- Mass: 8 lbs. (3.63kg)
- Length: 45.5-49.5 in. (1,155.7-1,257.3mm)
- Barrel length: 18½-28 in. (609.6-711.2mm)
- Cartridge: 12-gauge shotshell, 20-Gauge Shotshell
- Action: Pump-action
- Feed system: 4+1, 7+1 internal magazine
- Sights: Mid: Metal bead Front: Red bar

The Benelli Nova is a pump action shotgun, used for hunting and self-defense. It has a one-piece receiver and buttstock, made of steel-reinforced polymer.

== Technical specifications ==
Two main models are available as well as one variant.

=== Hunting ===
This model is available with a variety of barrel and sight configurations, most intended for hunting and/or trap/skeet shooting. It is made in both Matte and camouflage finishes. Barrels may be rifled or smoothbore, and are usually 24", 26", or 28" long. This model is available in 12 gauge or 20 gauge. Five types of chokes are available. Typically sold with improved modified and full, internal chokes. extended aftermarket chokes available.

=== Tactical ===
This model is intended for defensive purposes. With an 18½" barrel, and rifle or ghost- ring (diopter) sights, it is easier to wield and quicker to sight than hunting models. This barrel is smoothbore, and not tapped for chokes, reducing its versatility and rendering it less accurate at longer ranges. A slightly different model labeled the H2O Nova is similar, with the exception of an electroless nickel finish replacing the standard black coating. This model is 12 gauge only.

=== Supernova ===
This model incorporates a removable stock that can be replaced by a pistol-grip stock. This model has a bigger trigger set.
