= Benelli M4 =

Benelli M4 Super 90
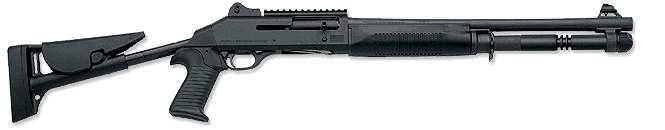
- The Benelli M4 Super 90
- Type: Semi-automatic combat shotgun
- Place of origin: Italy

Service history
- In service: 1999–present
- Used by: See Users
- Wars: War in Afghanistan; Iraq War; Libyan Civil War; Syrian Civil War; Second Libyan Civil War; Iraqi Civil War; Russo-Ukrainian War

Production history
- Designer: Benelli Armi SPA
- Designed: 1998
- Manufacturer: Benelli Armi SPA
- Produced: 1999–present

Specifications
- Mass: 3.82 kg (8.42 lb)
- Length: 889 mm (35.0 in) (stock retracted); 1,010 mm (40 in) (stock extended)
- Barrel length: 470 mm (18.5 in)
- Caliber: 12-gauge
- Action: Gas-operated, rotating bolt
- Muzzle velocity: 408 m/s (1,340 ft/s)
- Effective firing range: 55 yd (50 m; 165 ft)
- Maximum firing range: 164 yd (150 m; 492 ft) for solid slugs
- Feed system: 5+1 (civilian) or 7+1 (Military, LE) tubular magazine (using 2 3/4" shells)
- Sights: Ghost ring, Picatinny rail for optical sights

The Benelli M4 is a semi-automatic shotgun produced by Italian firearm manufacturer Benelli Armi SpA, and the fourth and last model of the Benelli Super 90 line of semi-automatic shotguns. The M4 uses a proprietary action design called the "auto-regulating gas-operated" (ARGO) system, which was created specifically for the weapon. Designed in 1998, the M4 was adopted by the armed forces of Italy, the United Kingdom and United States, among others, and has been used in a variety of conflicts.

== History ==
In May 1998, the United States Army Armament Research, Development and Engineering Center (ARDEC) at Picatinny Arsenal, New Jersey issued Solicitation #DAAE30-98-R-0401 requesting submissions for a new 12 gauge semi-automatic combat shotgun for the U.S. military. In response to the request, Benelli Armi SpA of Urbino, Italy designed and built the Benelli M4 Super 90 Combat Shotgun. In August 1998, five samples of the M4 were delivered to Aberdeen Proving Ground, Maryland, US. After intense testing, the M4 won the competition. In early 1999, ARDEC awarded the M1014 Joint Service Combat Shotgun contract to Heckler & Koch, U.S. subsidiary for importation of the Benelli M4 Combat Shotgun. The first 20,000 units were delivered to the United States Marine Corps in 1999. During testing, the prototype was named XM1014, as per U.S. military standards; after adoption, the "X" was dropped, and the weapon was officially designated the M1014.

== Design ==
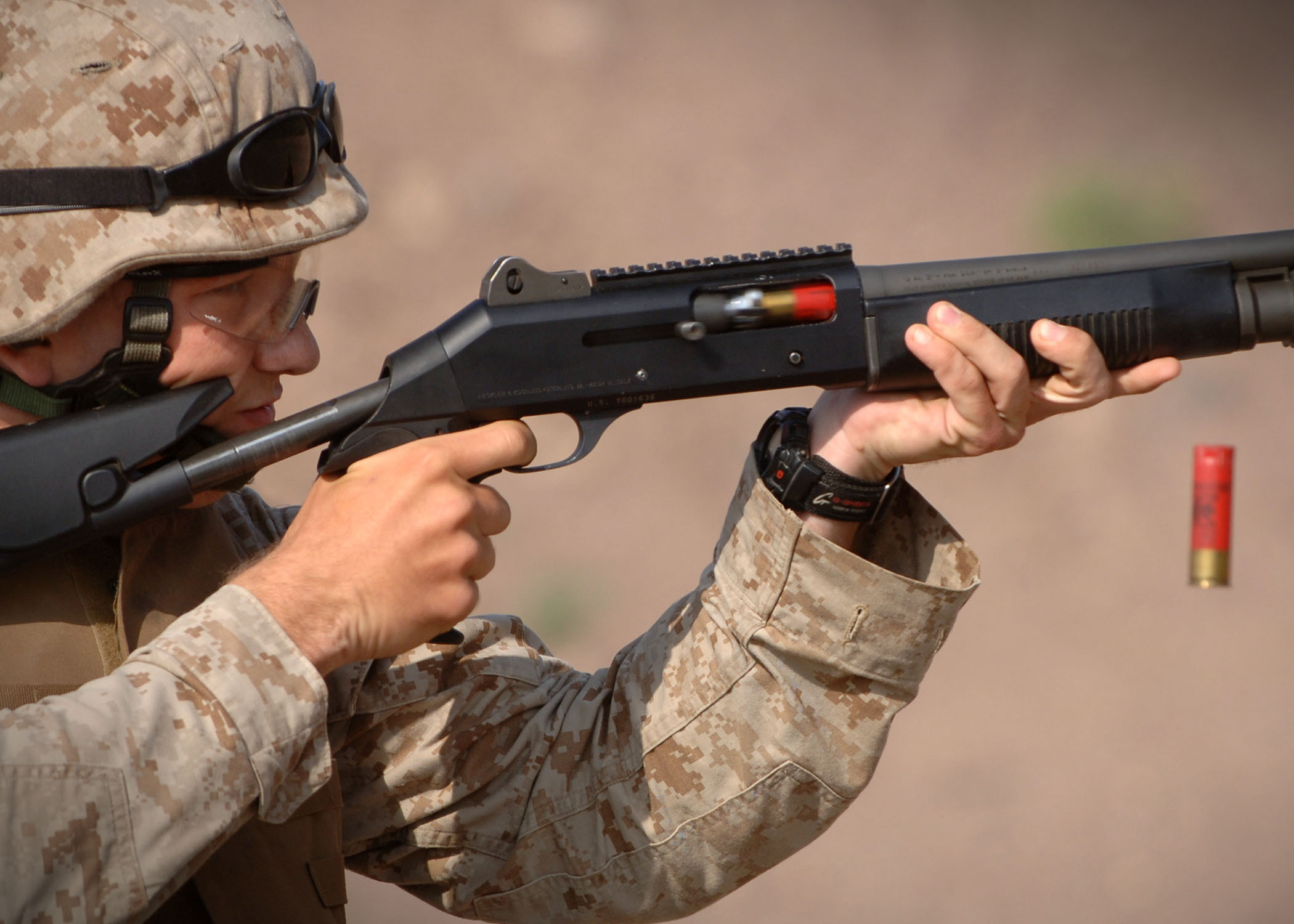
A U.S. Marine firing an M1014 shotgun as part of training in December 2006

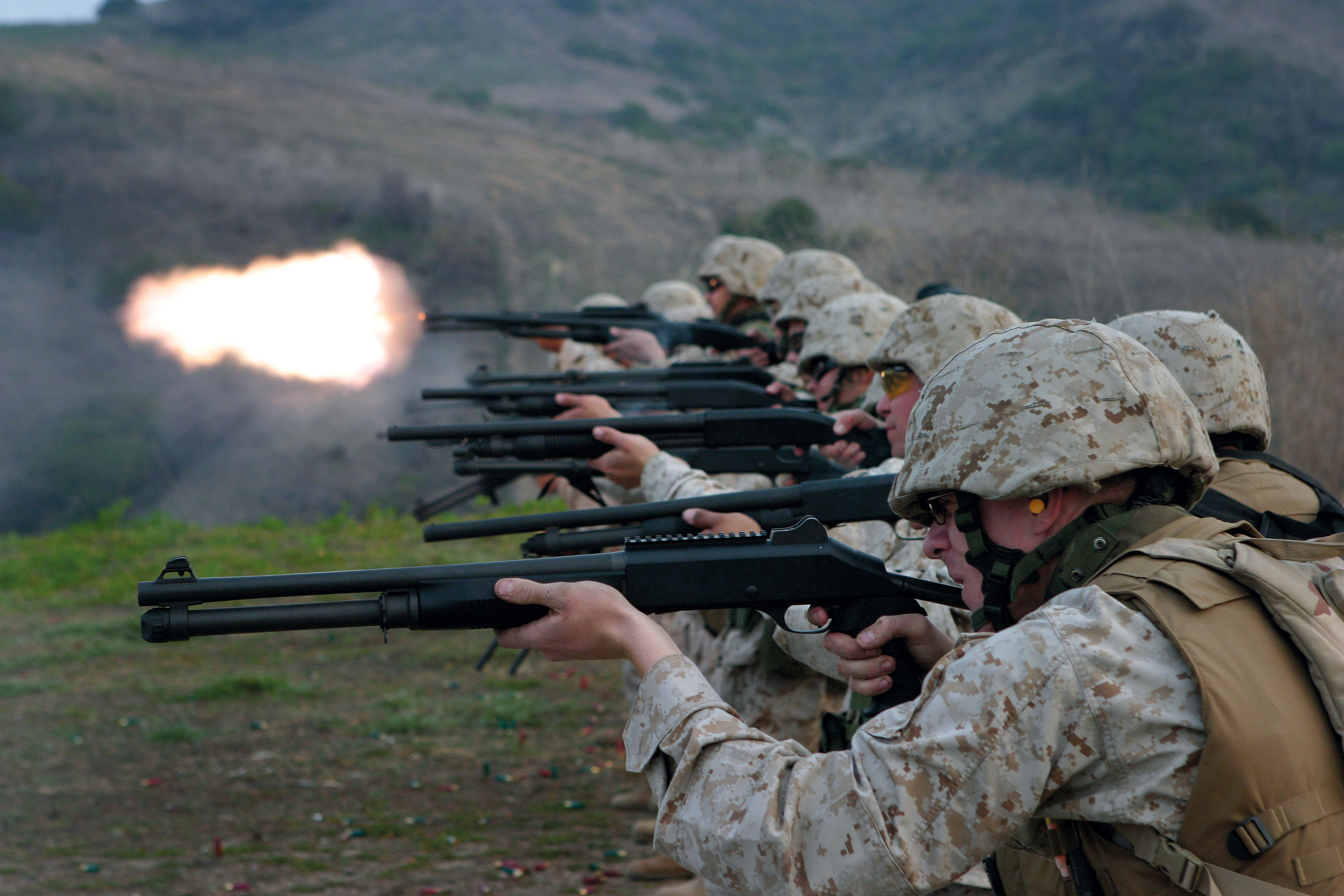
U.S. Marines firing their M1014s and Mossberg 500s

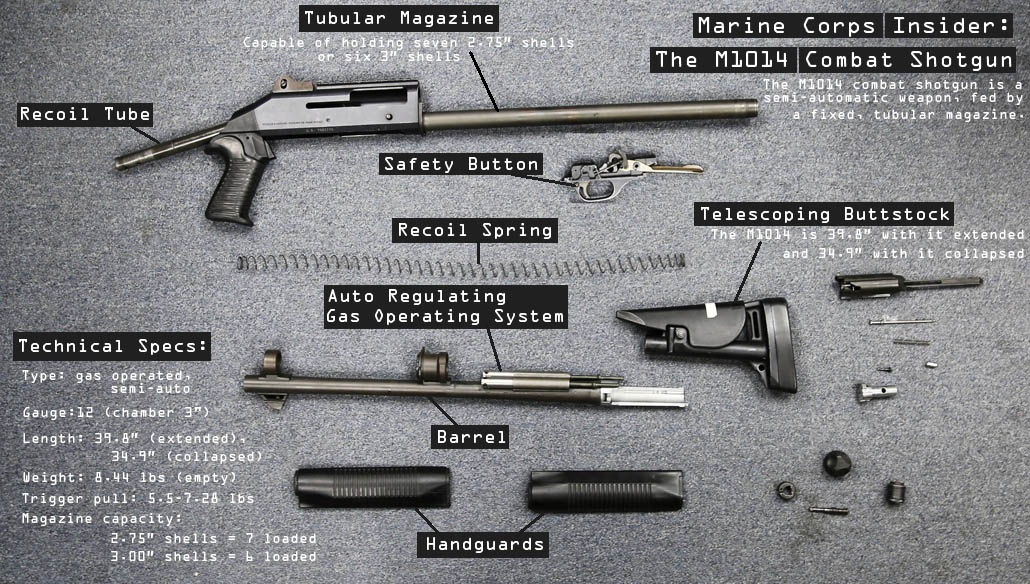
Marine Corps diagram of a field-stripped M1014

The M4 was the first gas-operated shotgun produced by Benelli. Its function is designed around an entirely new design called the "auto-regulating gas-operated" (ARGO) system. The short-stroke design uses two self-cleaning stainless steel pistons located just ahead of the chamber to function opposite a rotating bolt, thereby eliminating the need for the complex mechanisms found on other gas-actuated automatics. The ARGO incorporates only four parts: two symmetrical fore-end shrouds containing two small steel pistons that push directly against the bolt.

Additionally, the weapon is self-regulating for use with shotshells of varying lengths and power levels. It can fire 2.75 in (70 mm) and 3 in (76 mm) shells of differing propellant loads without any operator adjustments and in any combination. Low-power rounds, such as less-lethal baton rounds, must be cycled manually.

The sights are military-style ghost ring and are adjustable in the field using only the rim of a shell. The MIL-STD-1913 Picatinny rail on top of the receiver allows use of both conventional optical sights and night-vision devices, while retaining use of the original iron sights.

The modular basis of the shotgun means many of its features can be reconfigured as needed. It allows a user to quickly exchange the various assembly groups (barrel, buttstock, forend, etc.) without the use of additional tools.

=== Durability ===
Preliminary testing of the M4 suggests a high level of reliability. It can reliably function for at least 25,000 rounds without replacement of any major parts. The steel components of the weapon feature a matte black phosphated corrosion resistant finish while the aluminium parts are matte hard-anodized. These finishes reduce the weapon's visibility during night operations.

=== Collapsible buttstock ===
The buttstock is collapsible on the M4 Model (designated 11707) and on the M1014. (Note: While the M1014 was first manufactured before the Federal Assault Weapons Ban expired, it fell outside the ban due to being produced under military contract, and the relevant Technical Manual explicitly describes the buttstock as being telescoping; the M11707 was first manufactured following the expiration of the Assault Weapons Ban and its provisions.) Collapsing the buttstock shortens the weapon by almost 8 in (200 mm), allowing easier storage and transportation; furthermore, it permits better maneuverability around tight corners and over obstacles. The M4 is also available with both pistol grip and semi-grip fixed stocks, with these also being available for the M1014.

=== Rail interface system ===
The Picatinny rail built into the top of the shotgun accepts scopes, laser illuminators, night-vision sights and flashlights. Most modern military firearms have similar structures. There are aftermarket accessories such as handguards that incorporate other rail interface systems such as M-LOK.

=== Benelli Tactical and the M4 ===
Benelli Tactical is a division of Beretta's Law Enforcement (LE) division. Benelli Tactical manages the sales of all tactical shotguns to law enforcement agencies, government and military entities. The M4 shotgun is sold in three configurations: M4 Entry with a 14 in (360 mm) barrel; M4 with an 18.5 in (470 mm) barrel; and M1014, which is an M4 with the "M1014" nomenclature on it for military usage only. M4 shotguns sold through Benelli Tactical are available with the collapsible buttstock.

Benelli Tactical and Beretta LE have maintained the belief that the collapsible stock, while no longer illegal in the United States, is still only to be made available to law enforcement and government agencies, and thus does not sell them to private individuals; however, Benelli Tactical sells the stock piece for retrofitting the pistol grip stock, which can be shipped without restrictions.

Suggested retail price in the US of the civilian version is around $2,300. An NFA stamp is required to purchase or own the 14.5" barreled model only since this model is considered to be a Short Barreled Shotgun or SBS. Standard magazine capacity of the civilian version is 5+1, although it is possible to fit 6+1 and two shot extension tubes are sold by Benelli as well as some other companies. Also available are 9 + 1 extension tubes, which are popular in 3-gun competitions. Some LE models have become available to private individuals on the secondary market.

== Users ==
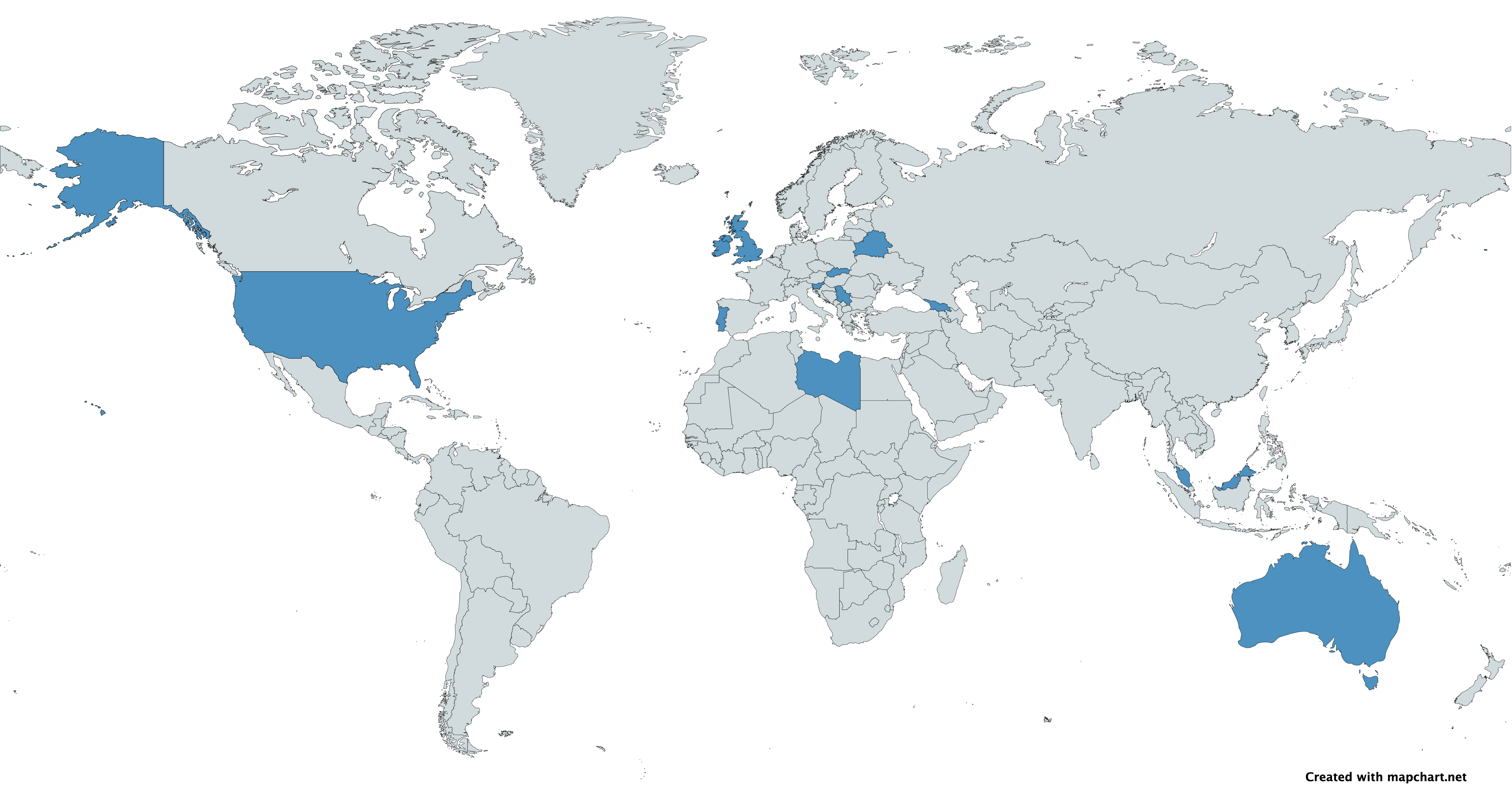
Map with Benelli M4 users in blue

- Australia
- Belarus: Used by Internal Troops, OMON, Almaz, and KGB RB Alpha Group. Seen with Alpha Group, Internal Troops, and OCAM units deployed to Minsk during the 2020–2021 Belarusian protests. It is also allowed as civilian hunting weapon.
- Belgium: Adopted on November 17, 2023, for counter-UAS operations by the Belgian Air Force.
- France : Adapted by the french army in 2026 to combat drones
- Denmark: Adopted by the danish military in 2025 to combat drones
- Georgia: Used by Ministry of Internal Affairs and military special operation forces.
- Ireland: Used by special forces and special police units (Army Ranger Wing, Special Detective Unit, Emergency Response Unit, Regional Support Unit).
- Libya: Ordered 1,800 before the First Libyan Civil War. Used by special forces.
- Malaysia: Used by the Royal Malaysian Customs Department.
- Portugal: Used by Portuguese Armed Forces.
- Serbia: Used by the Special Anti-Terrorist Unit.
- Slovakia: Used by the Special Defence Division and Intervention Group.
- Slovenia: Used by Slovenian Armed Forces Military Police.
- Spain: Used by the Spanish Marine Infantry.
- Ukraine
- United Kingdom: Used by the British Armed Forces, designated L128A1.
- United States: Used by the United States Armed Forces, designated M1014. Also used by civilian law enforcement and SWAT units, such as the Los Angeles Police Department and Cambridge Police Department.

== See also ==
- Benelli M1
- Benelli M2
- Benelli M3
- Benelli MR1
