= Benelli MR1 =

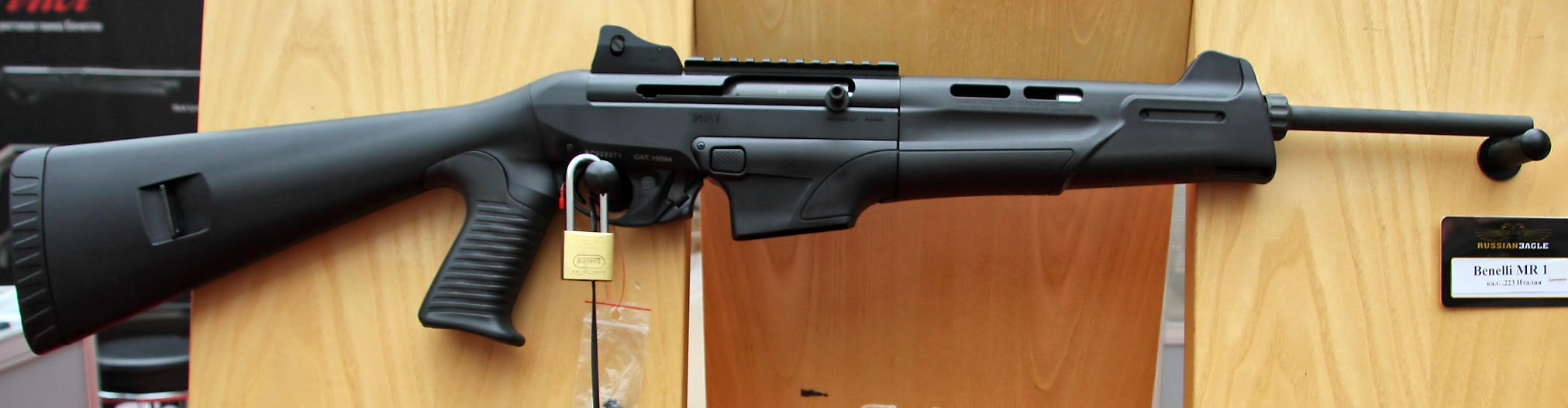
- Benelli MR1
- Type: Semi-automatic rifle
- Place of origin: Italy

Production history
- Designer: Beretta
- Manufacturer: Benelli Armi SpA
- Produced: 2005–present

Specifications
- Mass: 3.19 kg (7.03 lbs) without magazine
- Length: 854 mm (33.6 inches) or 943 mm (37.72 inches)
- Barrel length: 317 mm (12.5 inches) or 406 mm (16.24 inches) or 508 mm (20 inches)
- Width: 63.5 mm (2.45 inches)
- Height: 196 mm (7.84 inches)
- Cartridge: 5.56mm NATO/.223 Rem (6.8×43mm in research)
- Action: Semi-automatic, Gas-operated, rotating bolt
- Rate of fire: Semi-automatic only
- Feed system: 5-round STANAG magazine (Standard), can also fit 10-, 20-, 25-, and 30-round STANAG magazines.
- Sights: Iron

The Benelli MR1 is a semi-automatic rifle developed by Beretta (originally designated as the RX4 Storm) and manufactured by Benelli Armi SpA of Italy.

== History ==
At one point, Beretta planned to release this firearm as the RX4 (R for rifle), sharing a naming convention with other "Storm" products such as the Px4, Cx4, and Tx4. The MR1/RX4 shares design features with the CX4, such as side and lower rails that can be attached near the front of the gun. However, Beretta eventually decided to add the rifle to Benelli's product line instead.

== Design ==
The action is a gas-operated, rotating bolt, using the Auto-Regulated Gas-Operated (ARGO) system patented by Benelli. The gas port is located just forward of the chamber where the gases are hotter and cleaner.

The return spring is located in the stock, preventing the use of folding stocks despite the MR1's modularity. When the last round fires, the bolt locks to the rear. A ghost ring sight, adjustable for windage and elevation, is standard. The MR1 does not require tools for disassembly, and it has nine attachment points for slings to accommodate multiple carry options.

The MR1 is shipped with one five-round magazine. It can accept M16-style magazines with higher capacities.

This weapon operates only in semi-automatic mode; no selective-fire or otherwise full-automatic version of the MR1 is planned. The MR1 is not intended for military use as Beretta has already developed the ARX-160 for military and law enforcement use.

== Manufacture ==
The MR1 is the first .223 caliber carbine in the Benelli-family. It is entirely and solely manufactured in the Benelli Armi plant in Urbino, and marked "Beretta Holding" as Benelli has been owned by Beretta since 1983. In Italy, the MR1 carbine is listed in the National Catalogue of Firearms (the list of firearms approved for civilian ownership by the Italian Ministry of Interior) as the Benelli Mr1. The samples sold in the United States were assembled at the Beretta USA plant in Accokeek, Maryland with imported parts of Italian manufacture.

== Versions ==
Benelli manufactures the MR1 with three different barrel lengths: 12.5 inches, 16 inches, and 20 inches. The 12.5-inch barrel is threaded and features a removable muzzle brake.

The MR1's stock section is modular and can be changed between:

- standard hunting rifle stock;
- Comfortech hunting rifle stock;
- pistol grip with fixed stock;
- pistol grip with telescopic stock.

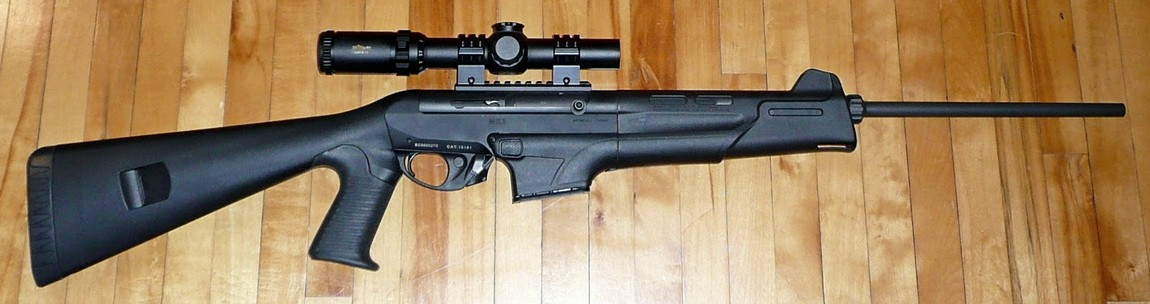
Benelli MR1 20 inch barrel (with a Millett DMS-1 rifle scope 1-4 X 24mm)

== Availability ==
The market availability of the different models differ from country to country. The 12.5-inch variant with removable muzzle brake is available to civilians in Italy like all the other variants. In other countries, the MR1 is available to civilians only with longer barrels due to local gun laws.

== See also ==
- Beretta Px4 Storm
- Beretta Cx4 Storm
- Beretta Tx4 Storm
