= Tom Knapp =

American sharpshooter (1950–2013)

Thomas J. Knapp (September 30, 1950 – April 26, 2013) was an American exhibition sharpshooter.

== Television and media ==
Knapp was featured on several television channels including The History Channel, Outdoor Channel, and Discovery Channel. He also hosted Benelli’s American Birdhunter for 8 seasons.

== Records ==
Knapp holds three world records for clay shooting. Those records included breaking ten simultaneously tossed clays while using a semi-automatic (a Benelli M2 Field), shotgun in 2.2 seconds, as well as breaking eight with a pump-action shotgun (a Benelli Nova Pump, in 2000). He also won a world record for shooting nine clay targets thrown with a Benelli M1 Super 90 in 1993.

World Record No. 1 Knapp joined Benelli in 1993 when he set his first World record with his Benelli M1 Super 90 by throwing nine standard clay targets (using no assistance) and breaking them with individual shots in less than 2 seconds.

World Record No. 2 On July 19, 2000, Knapp, with his pump shotgun in one hand, threw eight clay targets in the air with his other hand and broke every one of them with individual shots in 1.87 seconds.

World Record No. 3 In Murfreesboro, Tennessee, on October 20, 2004, Knapp, while using a 12-ga. Benelli M2 Field Semi-Auto Shotgun and extended magazine tube, launched ten clay targets into the air with one hand and shot all ten with individual shots in 2.2 seconds.
