= Benelli Argo Comfortech =

- Type: Semi-automatic carbine
- Place of origin: Italy

Production history
- Designer: Benelli Armi SpA
- Manufacturer: Benelli Armi SpA

Specifications
- Mass: 3250 gr. approx.
- Action: Benelli patented auto regulating gas operated semi-automatic
- Feed system: Depending on gauge, can fit a prismatic removable 2, 3, 4, 5 or 10 round magazine

The Benelli Argo Comfortech rifle is manufactured by Italian arms manufacturer Benelli Armi SpA. It is a technologically advanced version of the Benelli Argo, employing patented Benelli Comfortech technology.

== Design details ==
The Benelli Argo Comfortech has a rotating bolt head with three lugs, which combine to provide an effective locking surface. The fully tempered steel cover is equipped with holes for attaching scopes and is firmly connected to the barrel. This results in a greater accuracy at range. The free-moving barrel gives greater precision more akin to bolt-action models.

The plate kit used to adjust stock deviation and drop, together with the interchangeable sights, make the Benelli Argo Comfortech a versatile and multi-purpose rifle.

== See also ==
- Benelli Argo
- Benelli Argo EL
