= Benelli Argo =

- Type: Semi-automatic carbine
- Place of origin: Italy

Production history
- Designer: Benelli Armi SpA
- Manufacturer: Benelli Armi SpA

Specifications
- Mass: 3250 gr. approx.
- Action: Benelli patented auto regulating gas operated semi-automatic
- Feed system: Depending on gauge, can fit a prismatic removable 2, 3, 4, 5 or 10 round magazine

The Benelli Argo rifle is manufactured by Italian arms manufacturer Benelli Armi SpA. It is produced in two versions: the basic Argo version with a black anodised receiver and the Argo Special with a nickel-plated receiver.

== Design details ==
The Benelli Argo has a rotating bolt head with three lugs, which combine to provide an effective locking surface. The fully tempered steel cover is equipped with holes for attaching scopes and is firmly connected to the barrel. This results in a greater accuracy at range. The free-moving barrel gives greater precision more akin to bolt-action models.

The plate kit used to adjust stock deviation and drop, together with the interchangeable sights, make the Benelli Argo and Argo Special rifles versatile and multi-purpose.

== See also ==
- Benelli Argo Comfortech
- Benelli Argo EL
