= Benelli Argo EL =

- Type: Semi-automatic carbine
- Place of origin: Italy

Production history
- Designer: Benelli Armi SpA
- Manufacturer: Benelli Armi SpA

Specifications
- Mass: 3250 gr. approx.
- Action: Benelli patented auto regulating gas operated semi-automatic
- Feed system: 3 rounds prismatic loader for 300 WM, 2-4 rounds prismatic loader for 30.06 SPRG

The Benelli Argo EL rifle is manufactured by Italian arms manufacturer Benelli Armi SpA. It is a limited-edition version of the Benelli Argo, the only Benelli rifle to be produced as a limited series.

== Design details ==
The Benelli Argo EL's receiver is finely engraved and gilded with scenes of wild animals. The craftsmanship is of the master engravers of the Cesare Giovanelli studio. The stock and fore-end are in walnut with a fine oil finish.

The rifle has a rotating bolt head with three lugs, which combine to provide an effective locking surface. The fully tempered steel cover is equipped with holes for attaching scopes and is firmly connected to the barrel. This results in a greater accuracy at range. The free-moving barrel gives greater precision more akin to bolt-action models.

The plate kit used to adjust stock deviation and drop, together with the interchangeable sights, make the Benelli Argo EL a versatile and multi-purpose rifle.

== See also ==
- Benelli Argo Comfortech
- Benelli Argo
