= Benelli Raffaello CrioComfort =

- Type: Semi-automatic shotgun
- Place of origin: Italy

Production history
- Designer: Benelli Armi SpA
- Manufacturer: Benelli Armi SpA

Specifications
- Mass: 2900 gr.
- Barrel length: Choice of 26" or 28"
- Action: Semi-automatic
- Feed system: 3 Magnum rounds, 4 Standard rounds

Benelli Raffaello CrioComfort is the name of a semi-automatic shotgun. It is manufactured by Italian arms manufacturer Benelli Armi SpA.

== Design details ==
The shotgun has a relatively small number of component parts, incorporating a simple operating principle. The main features of the mechanism are the turning block bolt locking system and the cartridge feeding system (cut off). These serve to make the Raffaello CrioComfort reliable and practical, easy to strip and maintain.

== Operation ==
Except for the gas operated M4, all Benelli semi-automatic shotguns operate on the same basic principle of inertial operation, with a fixed barrel, utilizing the kinetic energy of gun recoil.

This system requires no outlet for gas or barrel recoil, but operates by means of a spring freely interposed between bolt head and bolt.

During firing, due to the recoil of the gun, breech block inertia makes it move about 4 mm forward in relation to the power of the cartridge, compressing the spring. When this is fully compressed, it overcomes breech block inertia, thrusting it to the rear under residual pressure, permitting cartridge case extraction and reloading with the conventional system.

The pressure of the spring is calculated to delay the opening of the action, which occurs after the shot has left the barrel, and to regulate the different pressures produced by cartridges of varying power, with no need for braking.

== See also ==
- Benelli Raffaello
