= Benelli M3 =

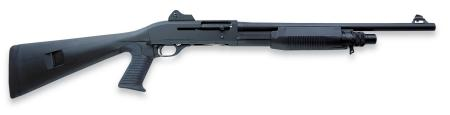
- Type: Combat shotgun
- Place of origin: Italy

Service history
- In service: 1989–present
- Used by: See Users
- Wars: Operation Ancient Babylon; Battle of the Bridges of Nasiriyah

Production history
- Designed: 1980s
- Manufacturer: Benelli
- Produced: 1989–present
- Variants: See Variants

Specifications
- Mass: 3.27 kg (7.21 lb)
- Length: 1,200 mm (47 in); 1,040 mm (41 in) (stock folded)
- Barrel length: 500–660 mm (20–26 in) (average length, depends on model)
- Cartridge: 12 gauge shells or slugs
- Caliber: 12 gauge
- Action: Pump action or recoil operated
- Rate of fire: Semi-automatic
- Feed system: 7+1 round tubular magazine (Military); 5+1 round (Civilian)

The Benelli M3 is a dual-mode (hybrid pump-action and semi-automatic) shotgun designed and manufactured by Italian firearms manufacturer Benelli Armi SpA, and the third model of the Benelli Super 90 line of semi-automatic shotguns. The M3 holds a maximum of seven rounds and uses Benelli's proprietary inertia-driven action system first showcased in the M1. The M3 is notable for allowing the user to choose between semi-automatic or pump-action operation.

== Background ==
Pump-action operation is employed when shooting less powerful shells, such as rubber bullets, that do not generate enough recoil to operate the semi-automatic mechanism. Conversely, the semi-automatic mode can be employed with more powerful shells, absorbing some of the recoil. Switching between the two modes is done by manipulating the ring located at the front of the forend grip.

The Benelli M3 also features a removable stock allowing the user to choose one of two styles, the traditional shotgun stock or a stock with a pistol grip.

The Benelli M3 is an updated version of the Benelli M1 shotgun. The M3 uses the same inertia recoil semi-automatic system as the earlier Benelli M1, but adds another Benelli-patented feature, which allows the shooter to lock the semi-automatic action and switch to the manually operated pump-action mode and back in the matter of seconds. The action type switch is located at the forward end of the forearm, and is formed as a winged and spring-loaded nut just behind the annular knurled ring. Rotation of this nut allows for the pump to be moved slightly backward, which engages the action rods of the pump system and locks the semi-automatic recoil system, or slightly forward, which disengages the action bars, locks the forearm, and allows the inertia recoil system to operate the action automatically. This improves the versatility of the shotgun, allowing it to fire low-powered ammunition (mostly of special purpose, such as less-lethal rubber or tear-gas projectiles) in the manually operated pump action mode, and to fire full power combat loads with slugs or buckshot in semi-automatic mode. An underbarrel tubular magazine usually holds 8 rounds for police or military versions, or less in some civilian models.

The M3 Super 90 is available with various barrel lengths and stock options, with fixed butt and semi-pistol or pistol grips, or with top-folding butts and pistol grips. Sight options include shotgun-type open sights, rifle type open sights, ghost ring (diopter) sights and various mounts for reflex or low magnification telescope sights and tactical flashlights and laser pointers.

== Variants ==
The Benelli M3 comes in several variations, most notably the M3 Super 90, which features a smaller body. There is also a shorter version, which is easier to transport, used by law enforcement officers and military personnel.

While other Benelli self-loading shotguns have the recoil spring inside a tube in butt-stock, in the M3 the recoil spring is placed around the magazine tube. This is an interesting feature for weapon modification, since other shotguns (such as M1, M2 and M4) attach the butt-stock to the recoil spring tube. The M3 has a dummy tube just for stock attachment.

Benelli's M3T is an OEM variant, where the butt-stock and dummy tube have been replaced with a pistol grip and up-folding skeleton butt-stock.

Benelli's SuperNova pump-shotgun and MR1 self-loading rifle have similar butt-stock attachment to the M3, so this adds two new butt-stock options to M3.

The M3 butt-stock and dummy rod can be replaced with a "Benelli SuperNova Tactical Collapsible Stock". The collapsible stock allows 5-position draw length adjustment, so a shooter can compensate the effects of thick winter clothes or body armor by adjusting the stock length. The required spare parts are: Adjustment rod, pistol grip and collapsible butt-stock.

A rare modification is to replace the M3 butt-stock and dummy rod with a "Benelli SuperNova Handle Grip". The "handle grip" is just the pistol grip attached to the receiver with a screw.

== Users ==
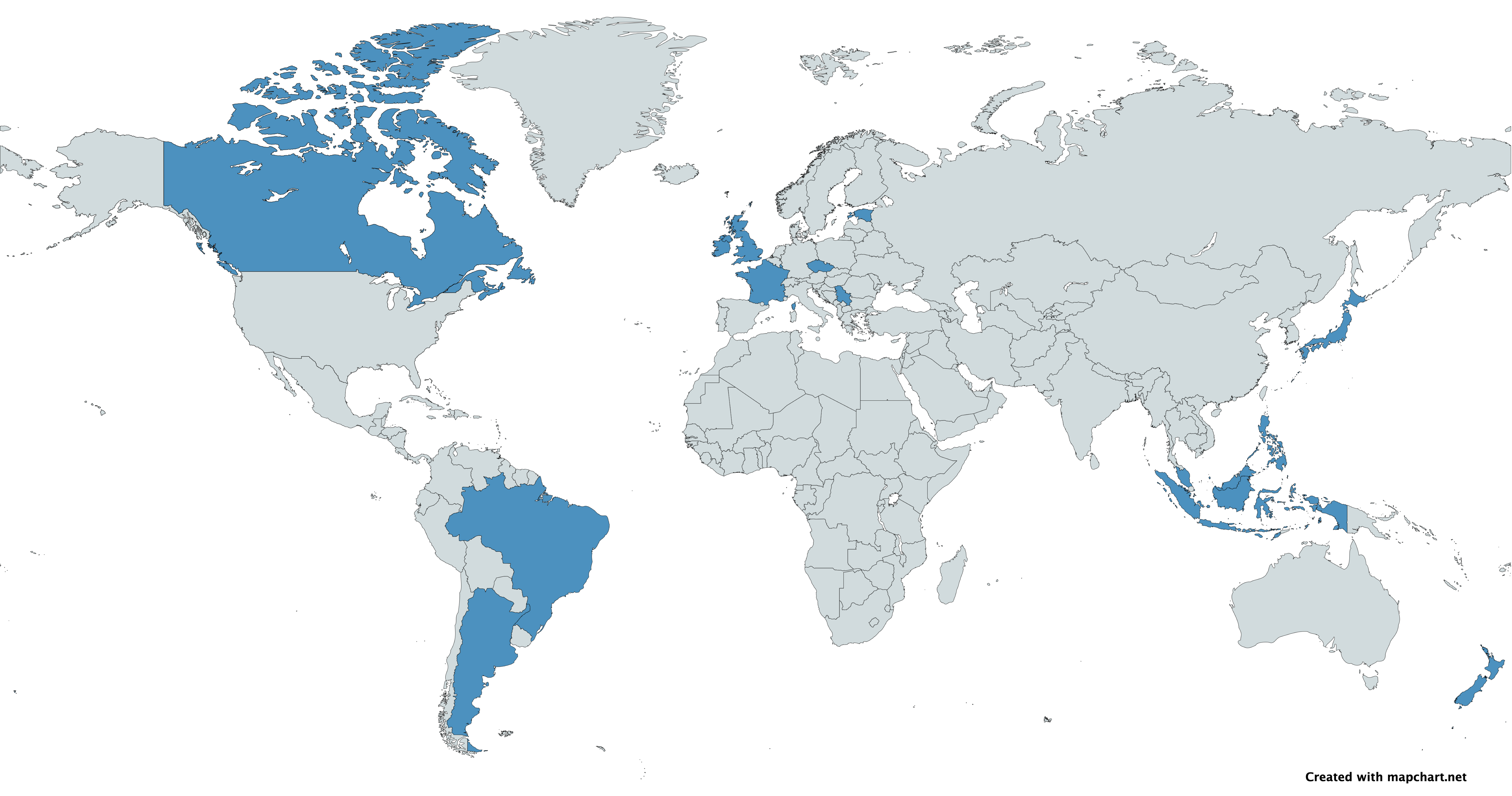
Map with Benelli M3 users in blue

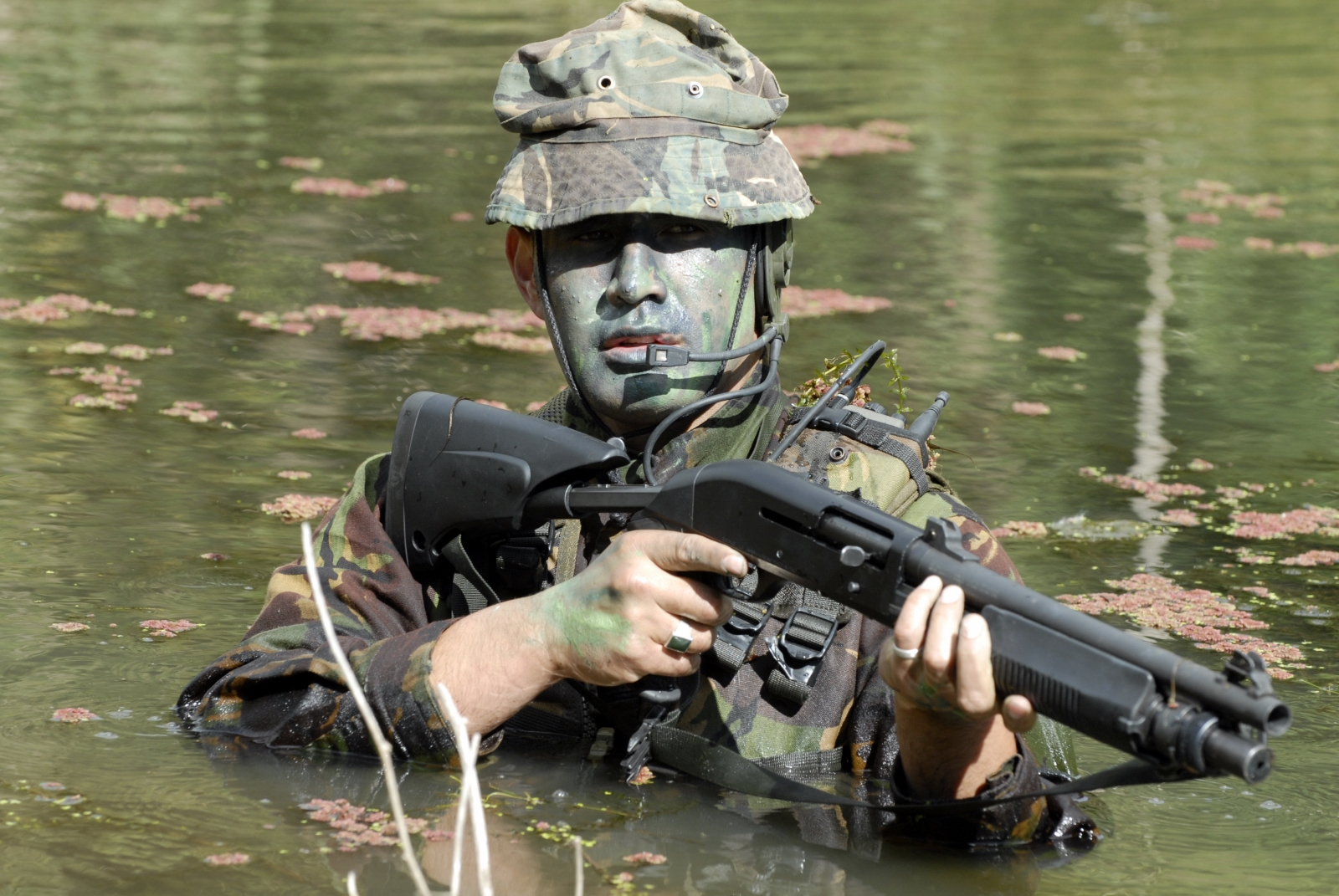
A New Zealand Army soldier armed with a Benelli M3

- Argentina: Used by Argentine Army and Argentine National Gendarmerie.
- Brazil:M3 Super 90 is used by 1º Batalhão de Forças Especiais
- Bulgaria: M3A1 is in use with the Joint Special Operations Command.
- Canada: Joint Task Force 2.
- Czech Republic: The M3T Super 90 is used by special units of the Czech Armed Forces. Used by operators of the 601st Special Forces Group.
- Estonia: Estonian Defence Forces.
- France: Select units of the French Army.
- Indonesia: M3T is used by the Komando Pasukan Katak (KOPASKA) tactical diver group and Komando Pasukan Khusus (Kopassus) special forces group.
- Ireland; Irish Army Ranger Wing, Garda; National Bureau of Criminal Investigation, Special Detective Unit, Emergency Response Unit.
- Japan: M3T model used by the Maritime Self-Defense Forces.
- Luxembourg: Unité Spéciale de la Police of the Grand Ducal Police.
- Malaysia: Pasukan Gerakan Khas (PGK) counter-terrorism group of the Royal Malaysia Police.
- New Zealand: NZ Defence Force; initially introduced into Army service in 2006.
- Philippines
- Serbia: Used by the Special Anti-Terrorist Unit.
- United Kingdom: Used by Avon and Somerset Constabulary and the Specialist Firearms Command of the Metropolitan Police.

== See also ==
- Benelli M2
- Benelli M4, successor to M3, adopted by U.S. armed forces as the M1014 Combat Shotgun.
