= Benelli Kite =

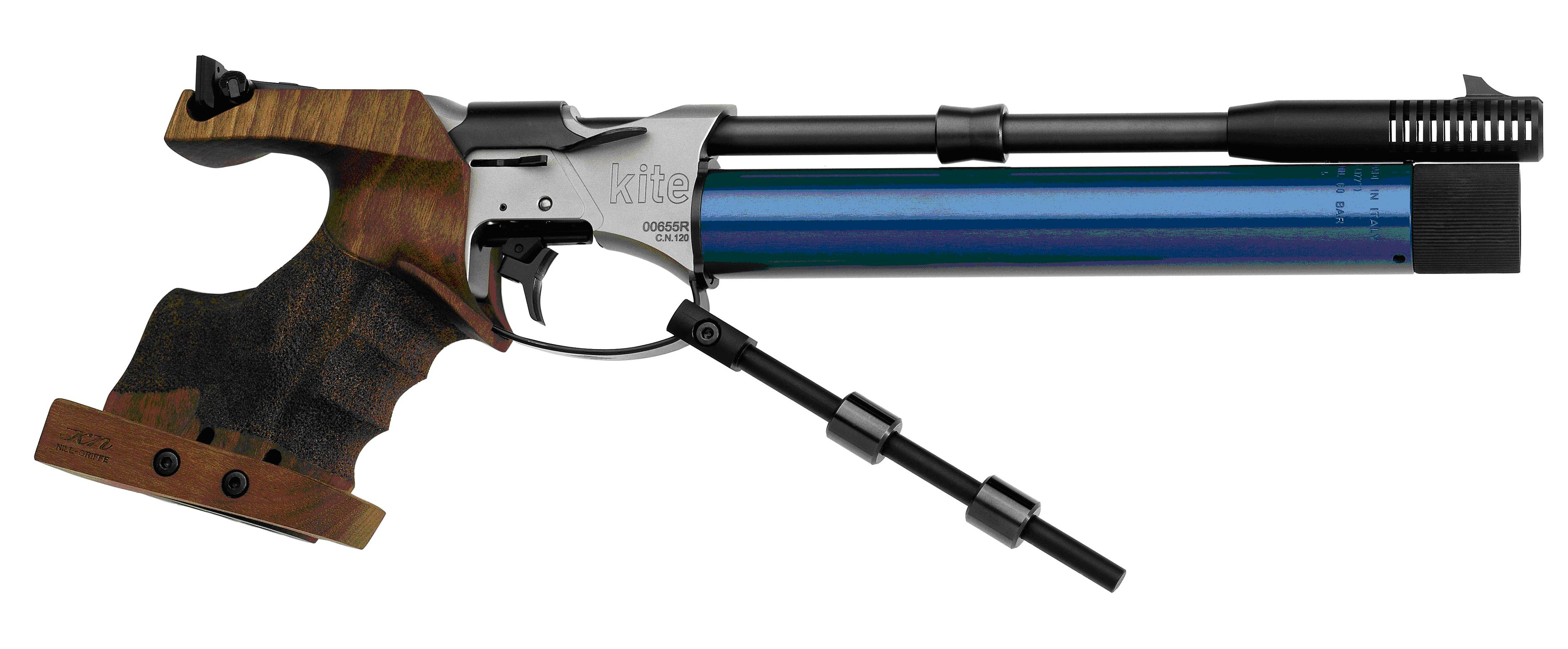
- Benelli Kite
- Type: Pre-Charged Pneumatic air gun
- Place of origin: Italy

Service history
- Used by: 10 m air pistol shooters

Production history
- Manufacturer: Benelli Armi SpA
- Variants: Benelli Kite, Benelli Kite Young

Specifications
- Mass: 0.8 kg (1.8 lb) (no magazine)
- Length: 433 mm (17.05 in)
- Barrel length: 240 mm (9.45 in)
- Cartridge: 4.5 mm (0.177 in) diabolo air gun pellets
- Action: Pre-Charged Pneumatic
- Muzzle velocity: 145 m/s (adjustable 135-165 m/s)
- Effective firing range: 10 m (10.9 yd)
- Feed system: single air gun pellet
- Sights: open, fully adjustable

The Benelli Kite is an air pistol manufactured by Benelli Armi SpA of Italy. It is a single shot .177 inch calibre pre-charged pneumatic air pistol designed for the 10 m Air Pistol ISSF shooting event.

The Kite was used by Francesco Bruno to win a gold medal in the Italian Championship 2008. It is also used by Tanyu Kiryakov, who won gold in the 10 m Air Pistol at the Olympic Games in Seoul 1988.

== Design details ==
Like all air pistols designed for the 10 m Air Pistol event, it has fully adjustable sights, a mechanically adjustable trigger (for stroke and weight of 1st and 2nd phase and trigger stop) and an anatomically adjustable grip available in three sizes and for left and right-handed shooters. The model pictured here is fitted with a stabilising balance weight, designed to further improve stability of the pistol during firing and to minimize recoil.

The barrel is manufactured by Lothar Walther with 12-twist right-hand rifling and 450 mm pitch. Air power is supplied from an under-barrel cylinder, available in four different capacities: long (300 shots), intermediate (230 shots), medium (180 shots) and short (80 shots). It uses atmospheric air compressed to 200 bars (20,000 kPa). A pressure gauge on the end of the cylinder allows for constant monitoring of the pressure.

The Benelli Kite features micrometric rear sight adjustment with four settings:

1 click = 1 mm windage (left/right adjustment) at 10 metres. 1 click = 2 mm elevation (up/down adjustment) at 10 metres.

The sight aperture is adjustable by lever and screw.

== Performance ==
The following tables show the results achieved by competitive shooters using the Benelli Kite in major competitions:

=== Gold medals ===
Competition	Location	Date	Competitor
Italian Championship Master	Bologna (ITA)	September 2003	Alberto Cardinali
Italian Championship Student	Bologna (ITA)	September 2003	Elena Ruan
European Championship	Gothenburg (SWE)	November 2003	Mikhail Nestruev
Finnish Championship	Finland	2004	Teemu Lahti
InterShoot	Netherlands (NED)	February 2004	Joao Costa
European Championship	Győr (HUN)	March 2004	Mikhail Nestruev
ISSF World Cup	Munich (GER)	August 2005	Mikhail Nestruev
Mediterranean Games	Almería (ESP)	2005	Francesco Bruno
Italian Championship	Milan (ITA)	September 2005	Francesco Bruno
Finnish Championship	Finland	March 2006	Kai Jahnsson
European Championship	Moscow (RUS)	February 2006	Tanyu Kiryakov
Italian Championship	Milan (ITA)	September 2006	Francesco Bruno
Italian Championship	Bologna (ITA)	September 2008	Francesco Bruno
Italian Championship Juniores	Naples (ITA)	September 2008	Andrea Scafa

=== Silver medals ===
Competition	Location	Date	Competitor
European Championship	Győr (HUN)	March 2004	Tanyu Kiryakov
ISSF World Cup	Milan (ITA)	June 2004	Tanyu Kiryakov
ISSF World Cup	Fort Benning (USA)	May 2005	Mikhail Nestruev
Internationaler Wettkampf	Munich (GER)	January 2006	Tanyu Kiryakov
ISSF World Cup	Munich (GER)	May 2006	Joao Costa
ISSF World Cup	Milan (ITA)	June 2006	Tanyu Kiryakov

=== Bronze medals ===
Competition	Location	Date	Competitor
ISSF World Cup	Granada (ESP)	October 2006	Tanyu Kiryakov
European Championship	Winterthur (CHE)	February 2008	Tanyu Kiryakov

== See also ==
- Benelli Kite Young - smaller version of the Kite, for junior competitors.
- Benelli Armi SpA
- 10 metre Air Pistol
- ISSF shooting events
