= Benelli Supernova =

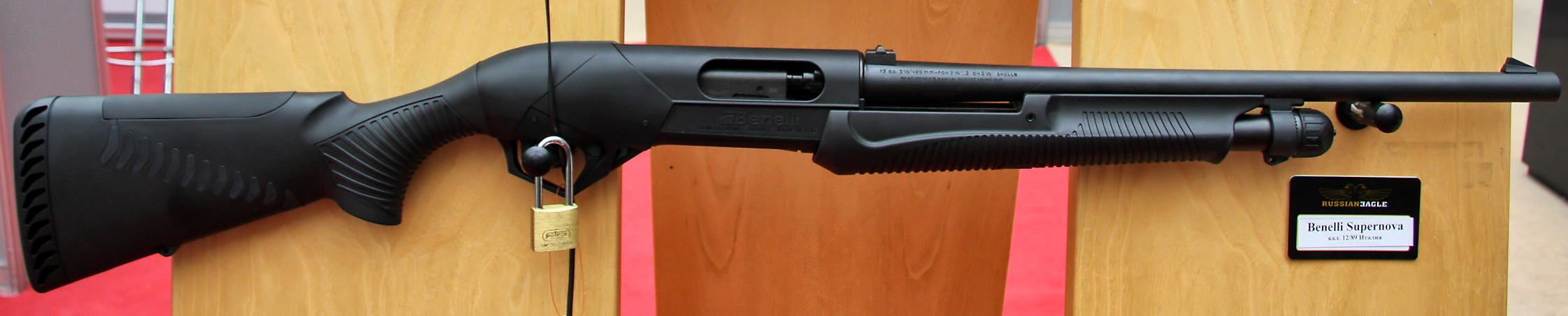
- Benelli Supernova on display
- Type: Pump action shotgun
- Place of origin: Italy

Production history
- Designed: mid 2000s
- Manufacturer: Benelli
- Unit cost: Upwards of $500
- Produced: 2006-present
- Variants: Nova

Specifications
- Mass: 7.2 lbs. - 8 lbs. (3.22kg - 3.63kg)
- Length: 40-49.5 in. (1,016.0-1,257.3mm)
- Barrel length: 18-28 in. (457.2-711.2mm)
- Cartridge: 12-gauge shotshell
- Action: Pump-action
- Feed system: 4+1, 7+1 internal magazine
- Sights: Mid: Metal bead Front: Red bar

The Benelli Supernova is a pump action shotgun used for hunting, self-defense and law enforcement, made by Italian firearm manufacturer Benelli Armi SpA. The Supernova features a recoil reducer, which is attached to the interior of the stock, and raises the length of time that the shot's impulse is spread across, thus lowering felt recoil.

== Variants ==
Three main models are available:

- SUPERNOVA with ComforTech: This model is available with a variety of barrel and sight configurations, most intended for hunting and trap/skeet shooting. It is made in both black and camouflage finishes. Barrels may be rifled or smoothbore, and are usually 24", 26", or 28" in length. Five types of chokes are available.
- SUPERNOVA with SteadyGrip: This model is only available in a 24" barrel. The steady grip was designed for improved accuracy.
- SUPERNOVA Tactical: This model can be equipped with an open or ghost ring sight, and has an 18.5" or 14" barrel with a fixed cylinder choke. with either a fixed stock pistol grip or an adjustable stock pistol grip.
- SUPERNOVA Tactical (Royal Thai Police spec): This model equipped with a ghost ring sight, picatinny rail under foregrip, and has 14" barrel with a three type of chokes. with an adjustable stock pistol grip.

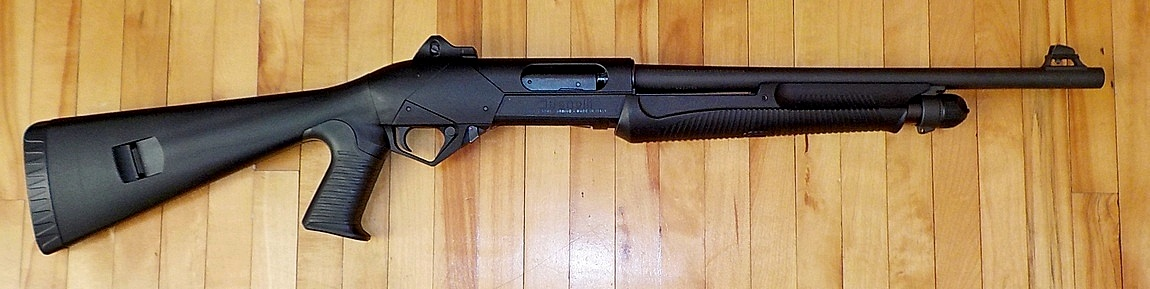
Benelli SuperNova Tactical 18.5 inch barrel with a pistol grip

== Users ==
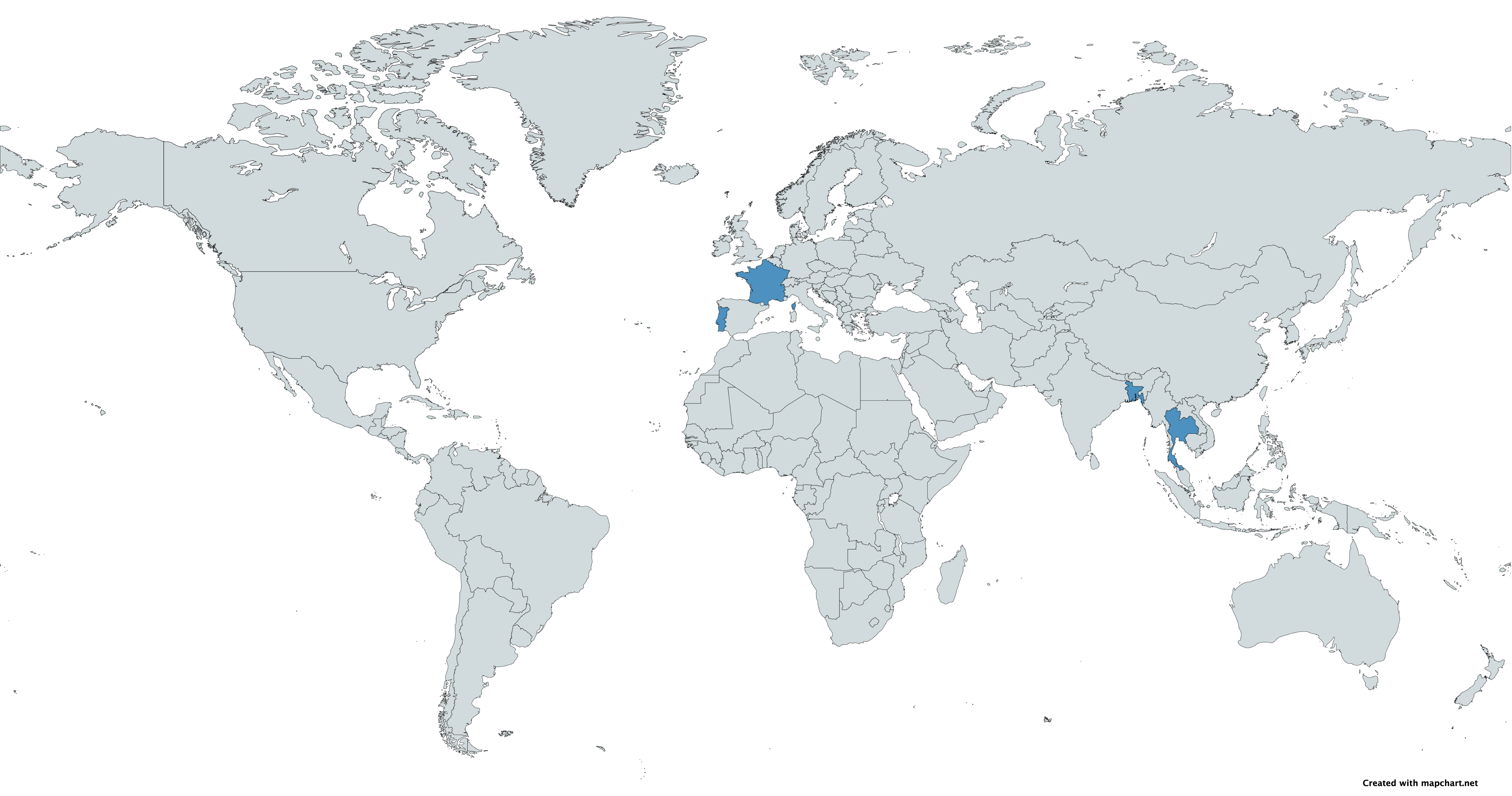
Map with Supernova users in blue

- Bangladesh:
  - Bangladesh Ansar: Quantity 1,800.
- France:
  - French Armed Forces: Selected the Benelli Supernova Tactical in 2022 as their new service shotgun.
- Portugal:
  - Portuguese Army: Bought 380 units in 2020.
- Thailand:
  - Royal Thai Police: Selected the Benelli Supernova Tactical 14" in 2020 - 2021 as their new service shotgun.
