= Battle of the Bridges of Nasiriyah =

Battle of the Bridges of Nasyriah
- Part of the Iraq War and the Italian involvement in the Iraq War
Date	April 6 – May 17, 2004
Location	Nasiriyah, Iraq
Result	Iraqi Mahdi army victory Mahdi army elements control Italian bases

Belligerents
Mahdi Army	Italy

Commanders and leaders
Muqtada al-Sadr; Aws al-Khafaji	(Italy) Luigi Scollo

Casualties and losses
200 casualties	11 wounded

The Battle of the Bridges of Nasiriyah refers to various episodes that occurred a few months after the attack of November 12, 2003, in which from April 6 to August 6, 2004, several battles took place between Italian troops and the Mahdi Army; the Italian soldiers were engaged in several clashes in the city, in which over 30,000 bullets were fired, for the control of three bridges that allowed the crossing of the Euphrates.

== Course ==
=== First battle, April 2004 ===
On April 5, 2004, around 1,000 Sadrists (led by the young sheik Aws al-Khafaji) seized unguarded bridges with an unopposed, surprise attack, entrenched themselves, constructed improvised barricades, and created several fire centers inside buildings and on rooftops. As the revolt spread, British command gave the order to free the bridges and restore free movement to and from the city. For the occasion, called off Operation Porta Pia which included 500 men from various companies from different departments, such as two companies of Bersaglieri from the 11th Bersaglieri Regiment, a company from the San Marco Battalion. As a response, an Italian force consisting of about 60 vehicles of various types and 8 armored reconnaissance vehicles (those were the B1 Centauro type, the heaviest vehicle tipe in the contingent) moved towards the three bridges. At the first bridge (Al-Zaytoun Bridge), about 40 Mahdi Army militants clashed with the Italian forces supported by armored vehicles and heavy machinery. The clash resulted in damage to a vehicle and the injury of 3 Italian soldiers. The confrontations were more fierce on the second bridge (Al-Nasr Bridge), where the Mahdi Army fighters put up fierce resistance and the Italian forces were unable to advance. They also targeted the VCC armored vehicles with RPG missiles, which led to the destruction of two of them. As for the third bridge (Al-Nasiriyah Expressway Bridge), a fierce battle took place in which the Italian forces used anti-tank missiles of the Panzerfaust and MILAN types to neutralize and target the fortified positions of the Mahdi Army elements, who fired various light weapons and RPG missiles at the Italian forces. They also clashed directly with them in a fierce confrontation in which the distance between the two sides was less than 50 meters. The Mahdi Army elements also targeted the supply and transport convoys of the occupation forces, where an attack targeting a convoy consisting of six vehicles led to the destruction of some of them and the killing of a Bulgarian civilian. At 3:00 p.m., after the Italian forces were unable to cross the three bridges and penetrate the city and impose their control over it, they offered a truce requiring a ceasefire and the Iraqi police forces to assume the tasks of maintaining security in the city. The two sides agreed that south side of the bridge would remain in Italian hands, and Iraqi policemen would patrol the north side. Another hour of gunfire accompanied the Italian disengagement. At the end of the day, Italian soldiers had expended 30,000 rounds of ammunition, and it had been necessary to resupply the troops 5 times during the day. The official casualties were 23 Italian and 15 Sadrists killed or wounded in action, but the Iraqi death toll might have been as high as 150 or 200. The Italian forces also lost 4 vehicles, in addition to the damage and destruction of a number of others as a result of targeting them with RPG missiles.

=== Second battle, May 2004 ===
In May, about 300 Mahdi Army irregulars launched a new offensive, and this time they were better armed, having portable ground-to-air SA-7 missiles and, perhaps, more powerful mortars. The Mahdi Army's organization and military preparation seemed improved: they operated in several assault groups of from 20 to 30 militiamen, each led by 2 well-trained commanders (called "the chosen"), with communications assured by a system of couriers and luminous signals.

On May 14, they took control over the city, the main roads, and the three bridges connecting it after police forces withdrew and refused to engage in combat against the Mahdi Army. In the early afternoon, about 40 Mahdi Army fighters managed to storm the Italian "Libeccio" base and take control of it, where the forces stationed there fled, leaving behind a number of their armored vehicles and weapons but, however, it was later retaken by the 3rd Company of the Lagunari Regiment "Serenissima". At the same time, about 150 Mahdi Army fighters attacked the Coalition Provisional Authority building, targeting the building with dozens of mortar shells and RPG missiles.

After difficult hours of fighting, the Italian governor of the city of Nasiriyah, Barbara Contini, tried on the night of May 15 to cross the siege and reach the Coalition Provisional Authority building accompanied by a large Italian military force, but she was exposed to multiple ambushes along the road from the Italian "White Horse" base to the Coalition Authority building, and several armored vehicles were hit by RPG missiles. However, the Italian force was eventually able to reach the building and evacuate the Italian employees who were trapped in it, so the Italian forces withdrew from the city completely.

On the morning of May 16, 50 Italians from the Lagunari Regiment "Serenissima" and the Regiment "Savoia Cavalleria" launched an assault against fortified enemy emplacements and mortars. The Italian force advanced through the narrow streets of Nasiriyah with eight troop carriers, four B1 Centauros, and an anti-barricades tank (a Leopard 2 tank with-out gun but equipped with a steel spade). At the "Libecchio" military base, the Italian forces were engaged in a fierce battle after the Mahdi Army elements launched a major attack during which they imposed a stifling siege on the occupation forces stationed there, shelling them with mortar shells and missiles, and engaging in direct clashes with the forces around them. During the battle, an Italian soldier was killed and four others were wounded. The Mahdi Army elements took control of the entire military base and set fire to Italian military vehicles and equipment, and seized various types of weapons and ammunition left by the withdrawing forces. Hours later, American Lockheed AC-130 warplanes launched multiple raids throughout the night targeting the city in an attempt to neutralize the Mahdi Army before a truce came into effect throughout Iraq whereby it was agreed to stop military operations and withdraw the occupation forces from city centers and hand over the task of protecting them to the police forces. The base was then attacked again by Italian forces and it was retaken from the Mahdi Army.

After the Sadrists violated this truce, the Italians, on May 17, restored calm forcefully and the forced the Iraqis to retreat from Nasiriyah. The battle ended in an Italian victory, and the casualties were relatively low (1 dead and 15 wounded).

=== Atrocities in Nasiriyah and attempted VBIED attack, August 2004 ===
On the afternoon of August 5, the Italian force opened fire targeting an ambulance carrying four Iraqi civilians, including a pregnant woman, who tried to cross a bridge, which led to the explosion of the car due to the presence of an oxygen cylinder in it, and the death of four out of seven passengers who were on board. Subsequently, another reconstruction cited documents published on Wikileaks which denied the use of firearms from on board the ambulance but confirmed that it had been transformed into a car bomb and that it did not stop at the checkpoint. The case was subject to military investigations in Italy, during which a number of Italian soldiers were brought to trial, due to the American journalist Micah Karen conducting an investigation into it and revealing that the Italian forces had fired on the ambulance, causing it to explode, and photographing the ambulance that was attacked. The opposition parties to the government in Italy also demanded that the facts be presented and that the affected civilians be compensated. The Italian forces were also accused of killing a number of the injured and wounded Iraqis, both Mahdi Army fighters and civilians alike. Italian soldiers admitted to targeting a passenger bus approaching a bridge with several bursts of gunfire, which led to the deaths of the passengers on board, including a child. Italian soldier Raffaele Allocca confirmed that the order issued to the Italian unit was to protect the bridges and prevent anyone from approaching them.

In May 2007, the Italian military court acquitted the soldiers who were accused of killing Iraqi civilians of the charge of premeditated murder, considering that they were on a battlefield.

== Literature ==
- Cappelli, Riccardo (March–April 2005). "Iraq: Italian Lessons Learned" (PDF). Military Review. 85 (2): 58–61.
