= Benelli M2 =

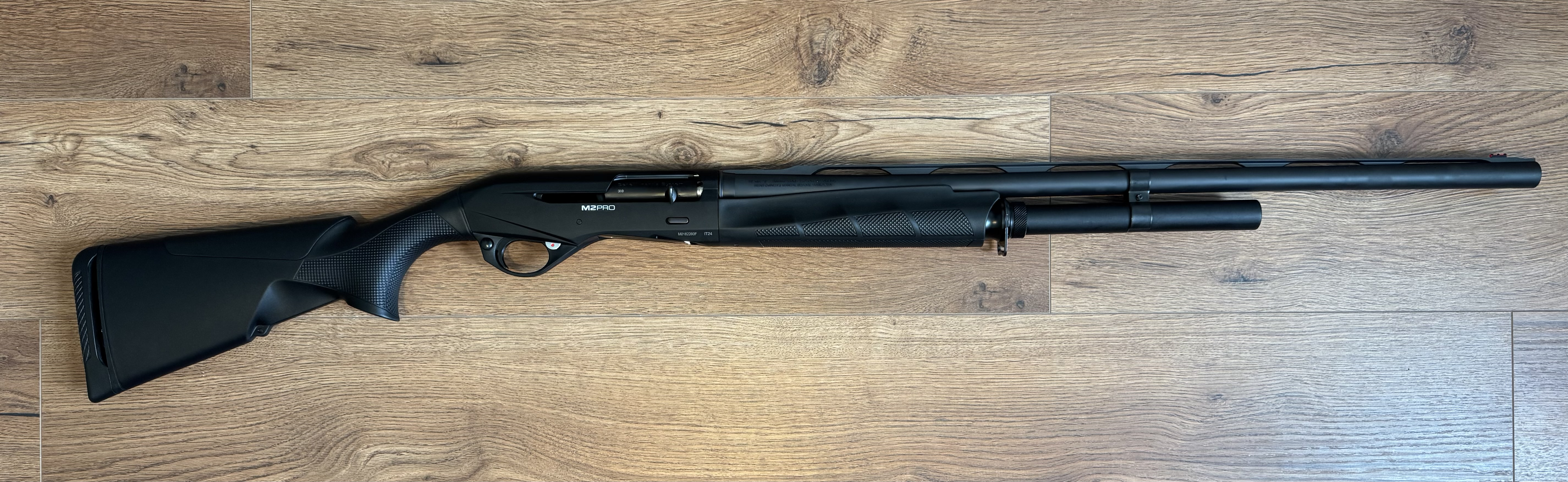
- A Benelli M2
- Type: Semi-automatic shotgun
- Place of origin: Italy

Production history
- Manufacturer: Benelli Armi
- Produced: 2004–present

Specifications
- Mass: 6.7 lbs (Tactical); 5.7–7.2 lbs (Field)
- Length: 39.75" (Tactical); 42.5–49.5" (Field)
- Cartridge: 12 or 20-gauge shells or slugs
- Caliber: 12 or 20 gauge
- Barrels: 18.5", 21", 24", 26", 28"
- Action: Inertia-operated, rotating bolt
- Feed system: 3 to 12 round tubular magazine

The Benelli M2 is a semi-automatic shotgun manufactured by Benelli Armi, and the second model of the Benelli Super 90 line of semi-automatic shotguns. It is an updated version of the Benelli M1. Like its predecessor, it is available in several versions for civilian, law enforcement and military use. It features the proprietary Benelli inertia system of operation.

== History ==
The M2 was introduced in 2004 as a successor to the Benelli M1.

== Operation ==
The inertia recoil system was developed for the Benelli M1, M2, and M3 shotguns in the early 1980s. This short-stroke recoil system is dependent upon the force of the shotgun's rearward movement under recoil. As a result of inertia, heavier loads cycle in a shorter amount of time.

The recoil spring is housed within the butt stock in the same manner as a Browning Auto-5 or Remington 1100; as a result, the shotgun can only cycle with a butt stock in place.

== Users ==
The M2 Super 90 is marketed as a tactical or defensive shotgun to military and police forces as well as to civilian hunters and target shooters for skeet, sporting clays and trap shooting.

Exhibition sharpshooter Tom Knapp used a Benelli M2 in many of his shooting demonstrations, breaking 10 clays in 2.2 seconds with the M2 and an extended magazine.

== See also ==
- Benelli M3
