= Beretta Cx4 Storm =

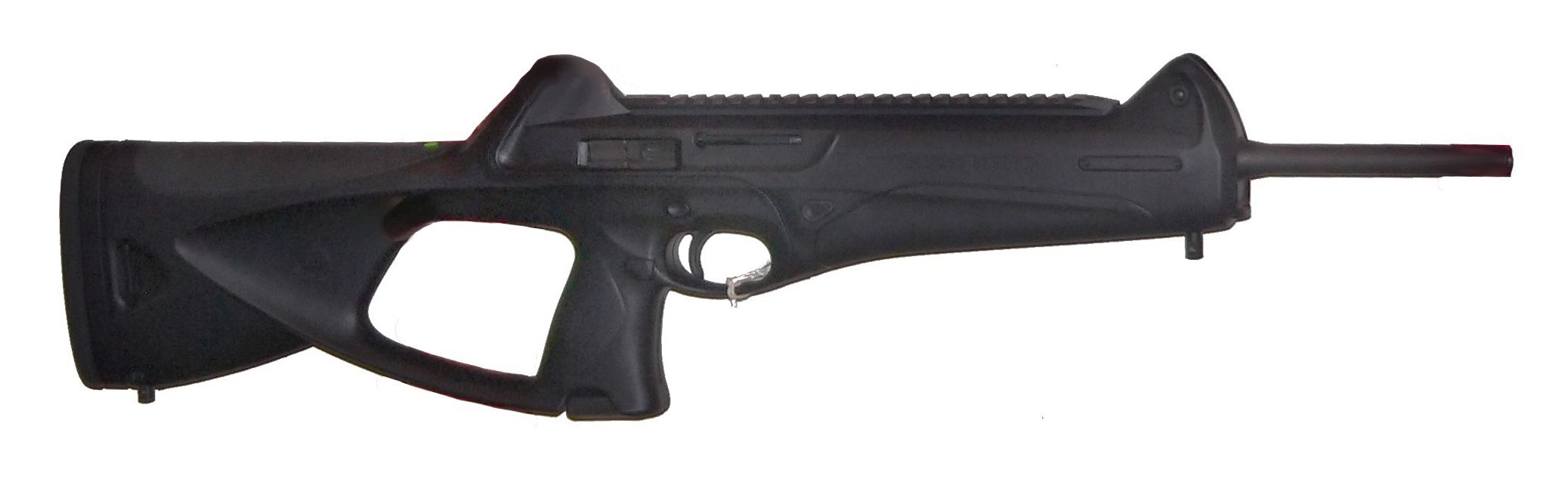
- Beretta Cx4 Storm in 9×19mm Parabellum
- Type: Submachine gun Pistol-calibre carbine
- Place of origin: Italy

Service history
- Used by: See Users

Production history
- Designer: Beretta
- Manufacturer: Beretta
- Produced: 2003–present
- Variants: Mx4 Storm

Specifications
- Mass: 2.48 kg (Mx4 Storm); 2.575 kg (5.68 lb) (Cx4 Storm)
- Length: 647 mm (Mx4 Storm); 755 mm (29.7 in) (Cx4 Storm)
- Barrel length: 312 mm (Mx4 Storm); 422.5 mm (16.6 in) (Cx4 Storm)
- Width: 63 mm (2.5 in)
- Height: 190 mm (7.5 in)
- Cartridge: 9×19mm Parabellum; 9×21mm IMI.40 S&W.45 ACP
- Action: Straight Blowback
- Rate of fire: ~1,000 rounds/min
- Muzzle velocity: 390 m/s
- Effective firing range: ~200 m
- Feed system: 8-, 10-, 11-, 14-, 15-, 17-, 20-, or 30-round box magazine
- Sights: Rear: 2-position aperture flip sight; front: adjustable post 327 mm (12.9 in) sight radius

The Beretta Cx4 Storm is a semi-automatic pistol-calibre carbine aimed at the sporting, personal defense and law enforcement markets. It was designed to accept magazines from different Beretta pistol platforms (92/96, 8000 "Cougar" series, Px4) using adapters. The CX4 is available in 9×19mm Parabellum, .40 S&W, .45 ACP, and 9×21mm models. The .45 ACP model can only use 8000 "Cougar" magazines.

The Beretta Mx4 Storm is the submachine gun variant of the Cx4 Storm. It is capable of fully automatic fire, features a 12-inch barrel, and is most commonly seen with a 30-round 9mm magazine that is compatible with Beretta 92 pistols.

== Design details ==
Both the Cx4 Storm and Mx4 Storm feature a Picatinny rail on top of the receiver for mounting modern optics, and a tri-rail adapter for mounting flashlights, laser sights, grips and other accessories. The firearm also has some ambidextrous features, such as being able to switch the fire selector, charging handle, ejection port and magazine release to the left side.

The Cx4 Storm was developed to be used in conjunction with Beretta semi-automatic pistols so that a person can carry one type of magazine for two types of firearms. For example, the magazines for the Beretta 92FS chambered in 9mm can be used in a Cx4 also chambered in 9mm.

Conversion between 92/96, 8000/8040/8045 "Cougar" 9×19mm Parabellum/.40 S&W/.45, and Px4 Storm magazines requires changing two parts, a magwell sleeve and the magazine release button (sold separately).

- 92/96: C5A511 magwell sleeve, C89109 magazine release button
- Cougar: C5A670 magwell sleeve, C89110 magazine release button
- PX4: C5C620 magwell sleeve, C89210 magazine release button

== Legal status in Canada ==
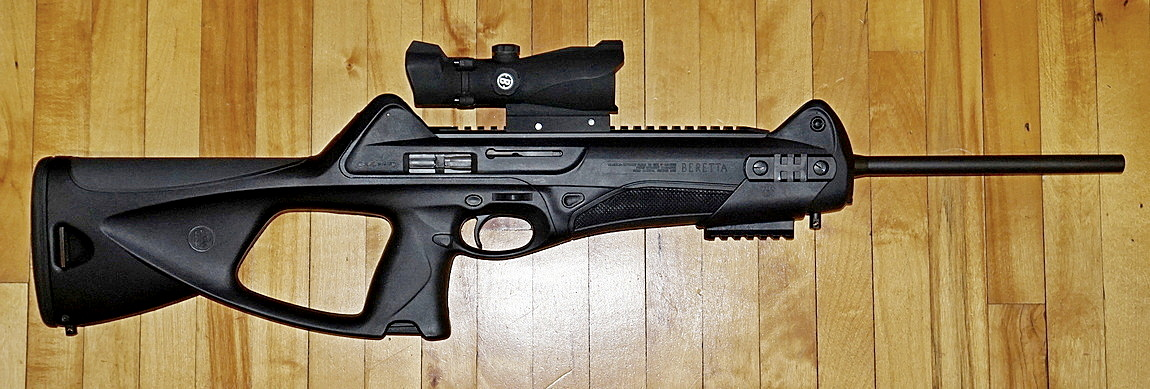
Canadian Beretta Cx4 Storm with 19-inch barrel and Bushnell MP red dot sight

The Cx4 Storm was the primary firearm used in the 2006 Dawson College shooting. The restricted class firearm had been acquired legally, and a coroner's inquest into the shooting recommended that all semi-automatic rifles be banned in Canada. Sales of the CX4 Storm increased in Canada following the shooting, and in 2011, Beretta introduced a non-restricted (19" barrel) variant of the Cx4, making it more accessible. On 1 May 2020 the Canadian government reclassified the Cx4 Storm (in all its variants) to be prohibited firearms.

== Users ==
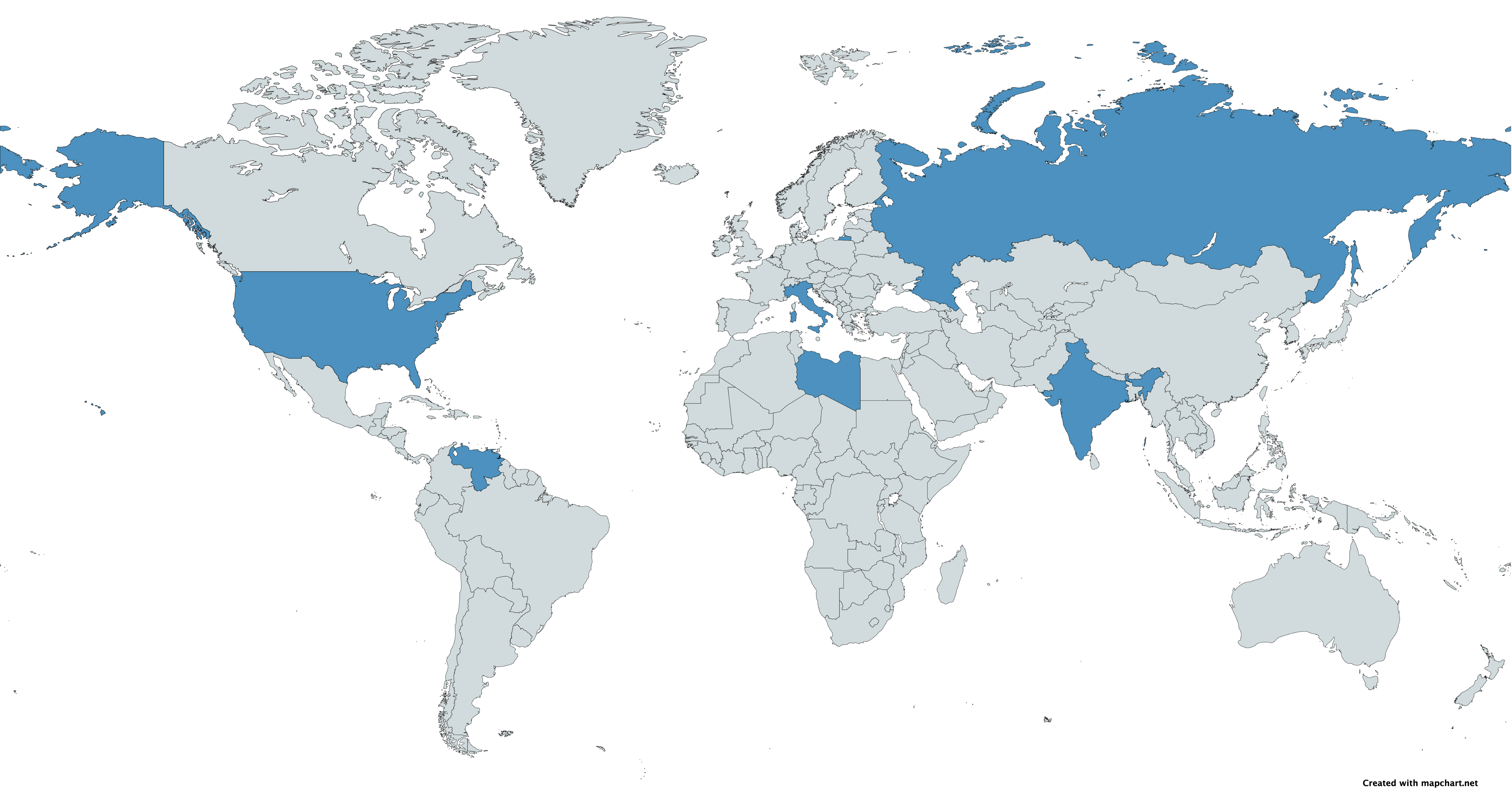
A map with nations who use the Cx4 Storm in blue

- Italy: In 2013, the Italian Navy (Comforsbarc) ordered 90 Beretta Mx4 Storms (for €58,606) to be delivered in 2014; a second order was placed in 2017.
- India: procured for use by Paramilitary forces of India.
- Libya: In 2009 ordered 1,900 carbines, before the civil war.
- Russia: Russian police received a large order of Cx4 carbines with a lengthened 500mm barrel.
- United States: Used by Albany County, NY Sheriff's Department (.40 S&W), St. Louis Police Department, and College of William & Mary Campus Police Department.
- Venezuela: Ordered in 2012 by Comando Nacional de la Guardia del Pueblo (Venezuelan Bolivarian National Guard).
