= Benelli M1 =

Benelli M1 Super 90
- Type: Shotgun
- Place of origin: Italy

Service history
- In service: 1986–present

Production history
- Designed: 1980s
- Manufacturer: Benelli Armi
- Produced: 1986–2005

Specifications
- Mass: 3.18–3.63 kg (7.0–8.0 lb)
- Cartridge: 12 or 20-gauge shells or slugs
- Caliber: 12 or 20 gauge
- Barrels: 26”,20", 18.5", 14"
- Action: Inertia-operated Semi-automatic
- Feed system: 3–7 round tubular magazine, depending on model

The Benelli M1 is a semi-automatic shotgun manufactured by Benelli Armi, and the first model of the Benelli Super 90 line of semi-automatic shotguns. Introduced in 1986, it is available in several versions for civilian, law enforcement and military use.

The M1 was succeeded by the Benelli M2, Benelli M3, and Benelli M4 models.

== Design ==
The M1 features the proprietary Benelli recoil system. The standard model features an aluminum alloy receiver and tubular magazine, and it is available with standard or pistol grip stocks. The M1 Super 90 can be fitted with traditional iron sights, or ghost ring sights. Mounts are available for laser pointers and tactical flashlights.

Due to the inertia recoil system, the M1 requires heavier loads to cycle properly.
