= Benelli Armi =

Italian firearms manufacturer

Benelli Armi S.p.A.
- Type: Società per azioni
- Industry: Arms
- Founded: 1967; 59 years ago
- Founder: Giovanni Benelli
- Headquarters: Urbino, Italy
- Key people: Bruno Civolani (inventor of the inertia-driven system)
- Products: Firearms
- Parent: Beretta Holding
- Website: benelli.it

Benelli Armi S.p.A. is an Italian firearm manufacturer located in Urbino, Marche, Italy. Founded in 1967 as an offshoot of the Benelli motorcycle factory that sold motorcycles through Montgomery Ward, Benelli and Benelli USA have been owned by Pietro Beretta SpA since 2000. Benelli is well known for its shotguns popular with military, law enforcement, and civilians alike, especially its "Super 90" line of semi-automatic shotguns produced since 1986.

== Products ==
=== Shotguns ===
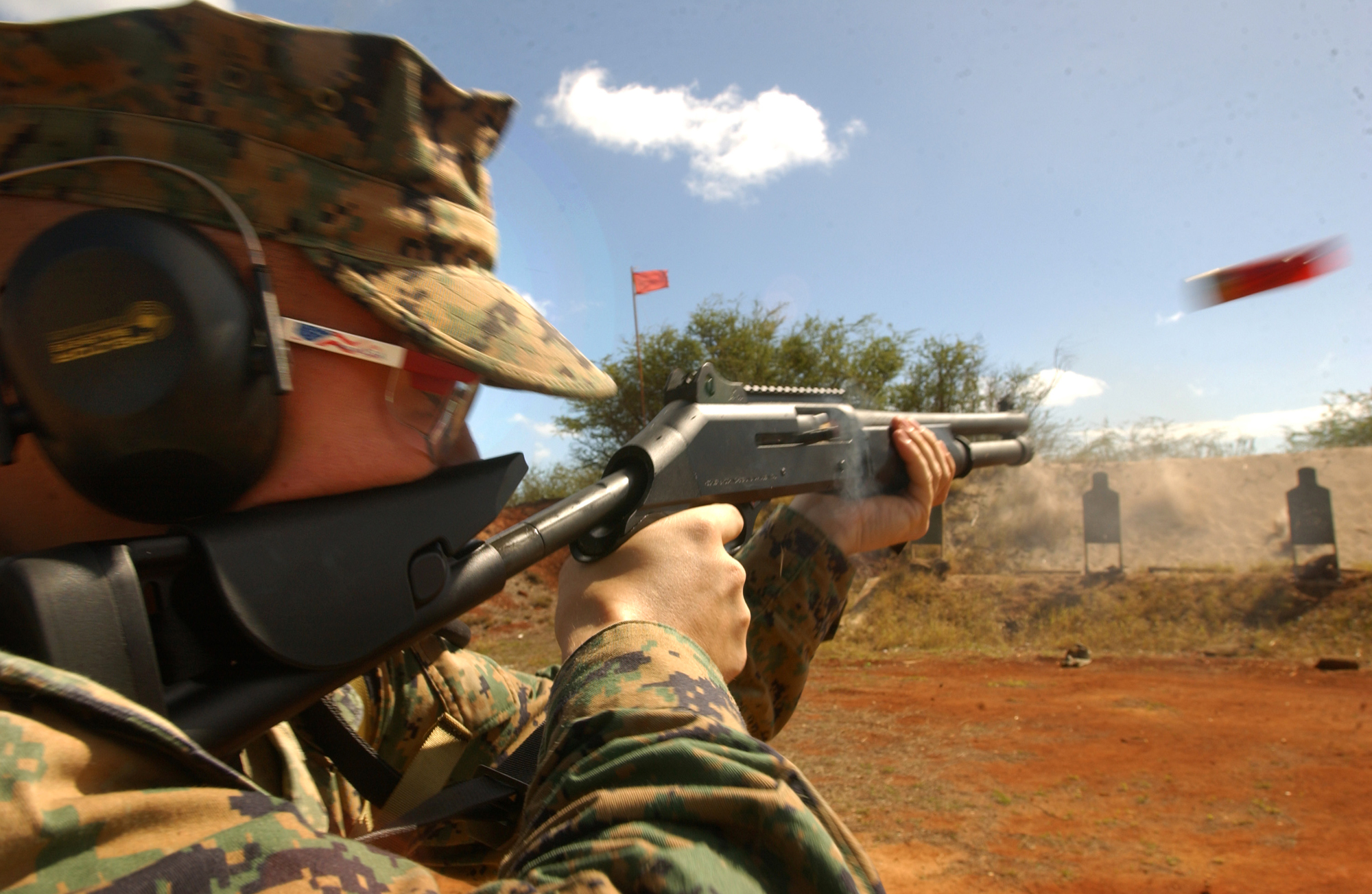
Benelli M4 being fired at a shooting range

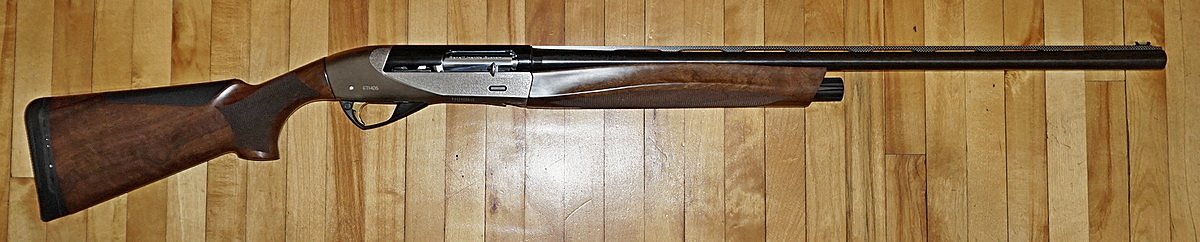
Benelli Ethos 12 gauge with 28-inch barrel

Many Benelli shotguns utilize an inertia-operated system developed by Bruno Civolani.

The Benelli Super Black Eagle, used by waterfowlers, was one of the first semi-automatic shotguns capable of firing the 2.75-, 3-, and 3.5-inch shotgun shells.

==== Semi-automatic ====
- 121, 121 SL-80, 121-M1 (12- and 20-gauge)
- M1 Super 90 (12- and 20-gauge)
- M2 Super 90 (12- and 20-gauge)
- M3 Super 90 (12-gauge, hybrid semi-automatic or pump-action)
- M4 Super 90 (12-gauge)
- Raffaello (12-gauge)
- Raffaello CrioComfort (12- and 20-gauge)
- Raffaello Crio 28 (28-gauge)
- Vinci (12-gauge)
- Super Vinci (12-gauge)
- Benelli Montefeltro (12- and 20-gauge)
- Super Black Eagle I (12-gauge)
- Super Black Eagle II (12-gauge)
- Super Black Eagle III (12-gauge, 20-gauge)
- SuperSport
- Ethos (12-, 20-, 28-gauge)

==== Over-under ====
- 828U (12-gauge)
  - 828U Sport (12-gauge)
  - 828U Upland Performance (12-gauge)
- 828S (12-gauge, 20-gauge)

==== Pump-action ====
- Nova (12- and 20-gauge)
  - Nova tactical
  - Nova field
- Supernova (12-gauge)
  - Supernova tactical

=== Rifles ===
- Benelli Argo
  - Benelli Argo Comfortech
  - Benelli Argo EL
  - Benelli Argo Special
  - Benelli Argo Deluxe
- Benelli MR1 (chambered in 5.56×45mm NATO)
- Benelli R1
- Benelli Lupo

=== Target pistols ===
- Benelli MP 90S
- Benelli MP 95E

=== Pistols ===
- Benelli B76

=== Air pistols ===
- Benelli Kite (Variant:Benelli Kite Young)

=== Submachine guns ===
- Benelli CB M2
