= Beretta Tx4 Storm =

Beretta T x 4 Storm
- Type: Semi-automatic shotgun
- Place of origin: Italy

Production history
- Manufacturer: Beretta

Specifications
- Mass: 6.4 pounds (2.9 kg)
- Length: 18 inches (46 cm)
- Caliber: 12-gauge
- Action: Semi-automatic

The Beretta Tx4 Storm is a tactical semi-automatic shotgun produced by Beretta. The gun is not to be confused with the handgun and carbine with which it shares its name.

The configuration of the gun includes a tall front sight with a white bead, top receiver rail, and a removable white Ghost Ring sight on that rail. The Tx4 has an 18-inch barrel that is cold hammer forged and lined with chrome. The capacity of the magazine includes 5 shots, and there is an ambidextrous safety on the trigger.

The shotgun's trigger can be adjusted with 1/2 inch spacers. A soft rubber grip inlays on the fixed synthetic stock which is overlaid by black rubber. A metal Picatinny rail is mounted on the receiver in order to accept optics. The shotgun has the capability to fire both reduced and full power loads.

The TX4 comes with a spacer to accommodate left-handed shooters and two sling swivels. This gun was shipped with two extra chokes, a choke tool, and an oversized charging handle.
