= ISSF 10 meter air pistol =

Olympic shooting event governed by the International Shooting Sport Federation

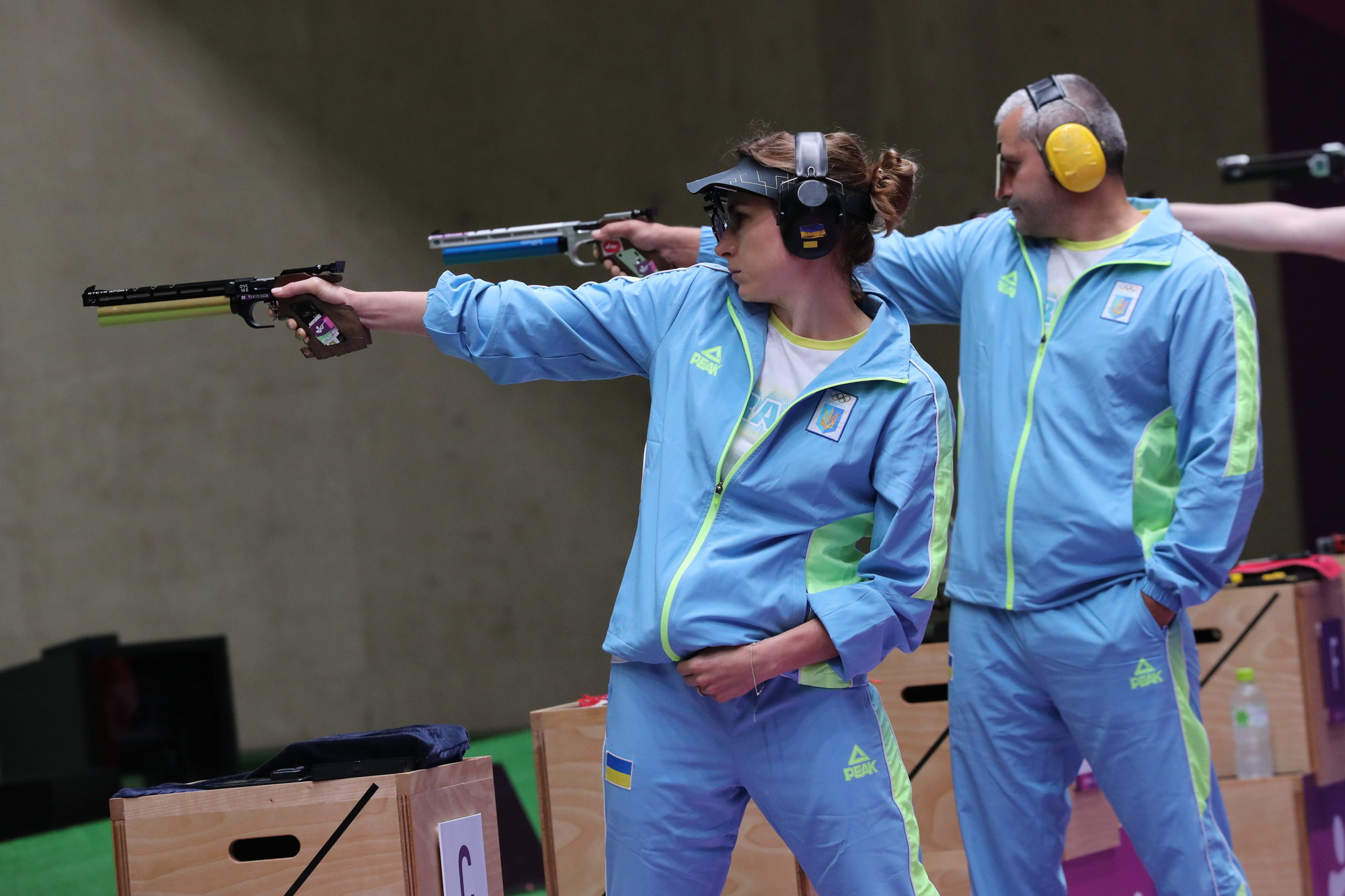
- Olena Kostevych and Oleh Omelchuk in the Air Pistol pairs event at the 2020 Olympic Games.

Men
- Number of shots: 60 + 24
- Olympic Games: Since 1988
- World Championships: Since 1970
- Abbreviation: AP60

Women
- Number of shots: 60 + 24
- Olympic Games: Since 1988
- World Championships: Since 1974
- Abbreviation: AP60W

The 10 metre air pistol is an Olympic shooting event governed by the International Shooting Sport Federation (ISSF). It is similar to 10 metre air rifle in that it is shot with 4.5 mm (or .177) caliber air guns at a distance of 10 metres (11 yards), and that the match consists of a qualification round of 60 competition shots within 75 minutes. If an electronic scoring system (EST) is not available, 15 minutes are added to the time limit. Competitors are allowed to shoot an unlimited number of shots during the 15 minutes preparation and sighting time. (Note: Not to be confused with the 15 minutes allowed when EST is not available.) Along with the 50 meter pistol, it is considered a precision shooting event. Thus, numerous shooters compete in both events.

There are some restrictions on the pistol regarding its dimensions, weight and trigger pull weight. It must be operated by one hand only from a standing, unsupported position. The shooter decides their own tempo as long as the maximum time is not exceeded.

After the qualification round, the shooters with the top eight scores move on to a final round consisting of 24 competition shots. After the tenth shot, individual commands are given so that the audience may follow the progress of the standings.

The major competitions are the Olympic Games every four years and the ISSF World Shooting Championships every four years. In addition, the event is included in ISSF World Cups and in continental championships, as well as in many other international and national competitions. It is an indoor sport and, at the highest level, electronic targets are used instead of the traditional paper targets.

== Range and target ==
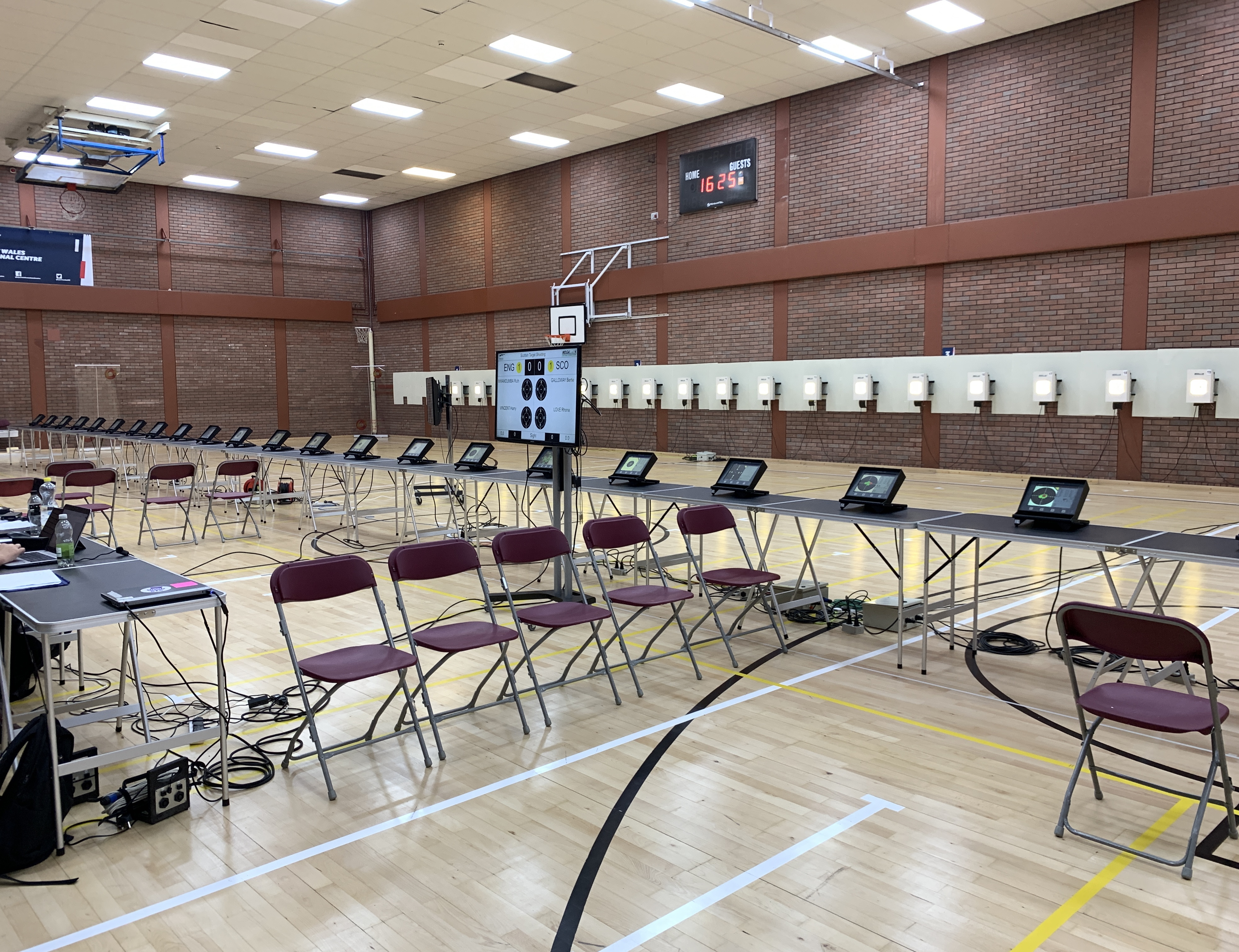
Temporary 10-metre range using electronic targets in a multi-use sports hall

The air pistol range is the same as the air rifle range, giving each shooter a table, a 1 meter wide firing point, and a 10-meter distance between the firing line and the target line. The current rules require ranges to be built indoors, with specified minimum requirements for artificial lighting. The distance from floor level to the centre of the target is 1400mm ± 50mm. Many larger and top-level competitions are held on temporary ranges installed in multi-use sporting facilities or convention centers.

The air pistol target is 17x17 cm with concentric score zones, the innermost (worth ten points) having a diameter of 11.5 mm.

The target, 17 by 17 cm (6.7 by 6.7 in), is traditionally made of light-coloured cardboard upon which scoring lines and a black aiming mark consisting of the score zones 7 through 10 are printed. There is also an inner ten ring, but the number of inner tens is used only for tie-breaking. The changing of these traditional targets is handled by each shooter by means of electronic—or more archaically, manually operated—carrier devices. In major competitions, only one shot may be fired on each target, a number that can increase to two, five, or even ten with lowering level and importance of the competition. Used targets are collected by range officials to be scored in a separate office.

During the last few decades, these paper targets have been gradually replaced by electronic target systems, which immediately display the results on monitors. When using these systems, actual scoring lines are not printed, but the location of the impact hole (which can be determined acoustically) is automatically converted into corresponding scores by a computer. ISSF rules now require the use of these systems in top-level competitions. They are generally used in other international competitions as well, and in some countries they are even common in national competitions.

== Equipment ==
To promote comfortable and accurate shooting from a standing position, match air pistols must have fast lock times, shoot with little recoil or vibration, and exhibit minimal movement and balance shifts during discharge. The pistol must also be able to be tailored by adjustable user interfaces and various accessories to an individual shooter's personal preferences. Combined with appropriate match pellets, the pistol must produce a consistent 10-ring performance so that a non maximal result during the initial phase can be attributed to the participant.

The pistols used are gas-driven with a caliber of 4.5 mm (0.18 in). The minimum trigger pull weight is 500 grams (18 ounces), half that of a sport pistol. The grip restrictions are similar to sport pistols, but the box in which an air pistol must fit is larger: 42 by 20 by 5 cm (16.5 by 7.9 by 2.0 in). This allows for longer sight lines and also gives room for cocking arms, although with a few exceptions (such as the Baikal IZH-46M) modern match air pistols use pre-filled air, or less commonly carbon dioxide, containers. The maximum overall weight is 1.5 kg (3.31 lb). The pistol must be operated by only one hand from a standing position, and may be loaded with only one pellet at a time.

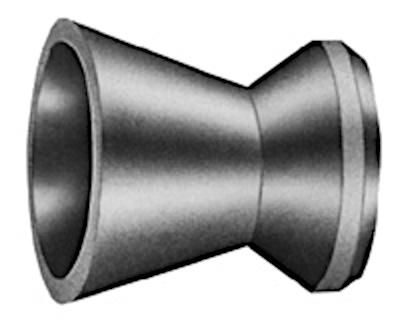
A typical 4.5 mm (0.18 in) 10 m air pistol match pellet

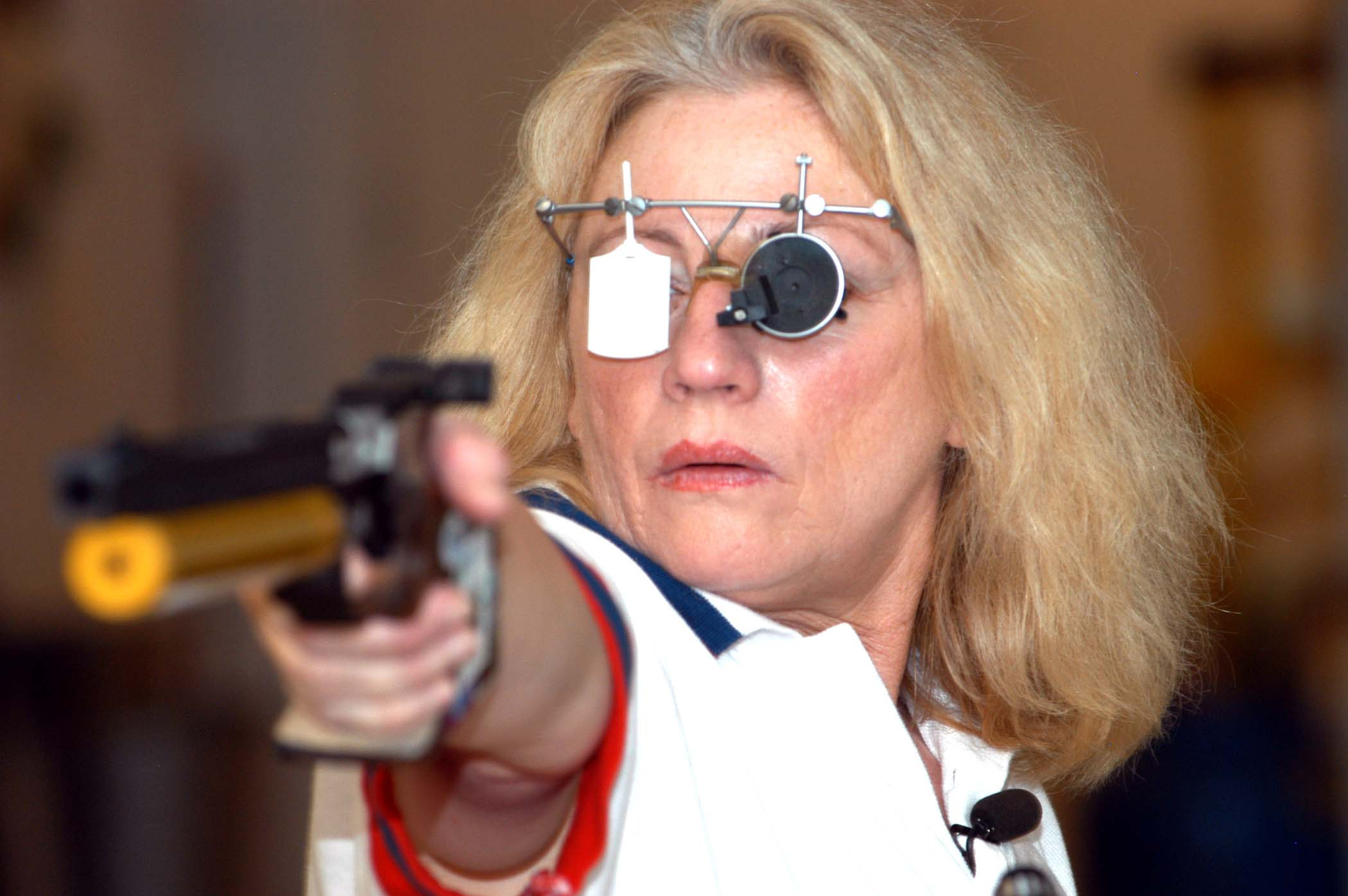
Optical aids are common amongst pistol shooting competitors

For the 10 metre air pistol and air rifle disciplines match, diabolo pellets are used. These pellets have wadcutter heads, meaning the front is (nearly) flat, which leave clean round holes in paper targets for easy scoring. Match pellets are offered in tins and more elaborate packages that avoid deformation and other damage that could impair their uniformity. Air gunners are encouraged to perform shooting group tests with their gun clamped in a machine rest to establish which particular match pellet type performs best for their particular air gun. To facilitate maximum performance out of various air guns, the leading match pellet manufacturers produce pellets with graduated "head sizes", which means the pellets are offered with front diameters from 4.48 mm up to 4.51 mm.

As in other ISSF pistol events, clothing that restricts the movement of joints for support is not allowed. Optical aids such as iris diaphragms or prescription glasses are allowed as long as they are not mounted on the pistol, which may have open sights only. Though shooting glasses are extremely customizable, most pairs contain three basic elements: a lens, a mechanical iris, and a blinder. These components work together to help shooters focus on both the faraway target and their gun's sights at the same time. Ear protection is recommended by the ISSF as well as by coaches, who sometimes stress their usefulness in shutting out distracting noise rather than their necessity for safety reasons (paramount in other shooting disciplines).

It is each shooter's responsibility to get his or her pistol and shoes validated in a specific area (the equipment control) prior to starting the competition. To discourage shooters from lowering the trigger pull weight after passing equipment control, random controls are conducted after the match. Failure to pass such controls results in immediate disqualification.

=== Match air pistols in production ===
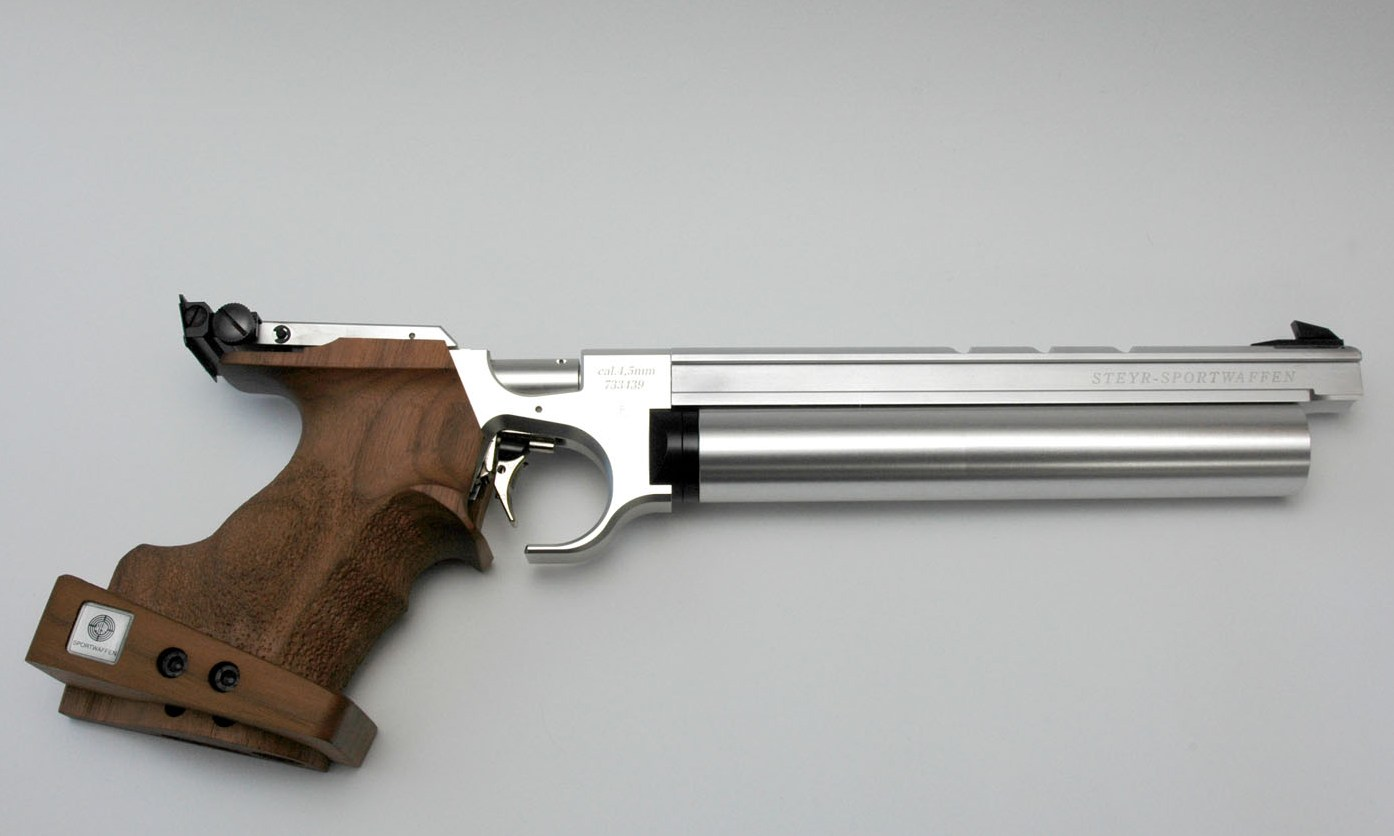
Steyr LP10 PCP air pistol

- Baikal IZH-46M *available in the USA under Air Venturi Import, model AV-46M.
- Benelli Kite and Benelli Kite Young
- FAS 6004
- Feinwerkbau P8X and Feinwerkbau P11
- Hämmerli AP20
- Match Guns MGH1, MGH1- Light and Match Guns MGH1- Hybrid
- Morini CM 162 EI, Morini CM 162 MI, Morin I 162 EI- Titanium, and Morini 200 EI
- Pardini K10 & K12 and Pardini K10 & K12 Junior
- Steyr Evo 10, Steyr Evo 10E, Steyr LP 2 and Steyr LP 50
- Tesro PA 10-2
- Walther LP500
- Walther LP400
- Precihole PX50

== Course of fire ==
Shooters are generally divided into four classes: men, junior men, women and junior women. The junior classes are included in most championships, with some notable exceptions (such as the Olympic Games and the ISSF World Cups). A shooter remains a junior up to and including the calendar year in which he or she becomes 21 years of age, although a junior may opt to participate in the main class instead. There are also ISSF Junior World Cups.

In both the qualification stage and the final stage, all shooting is supervised by a Chief Range Officer, whose duties include responsibility for the correct behaviour of all personnel, dealing with technical irregularities, and cooperation with the jury.

=== Qualification ===
For the qualification stage, the shooters are divided as necessary into relays. Each relay starts with a 15-minute preparation time during which the shooter may fire an unlimited number of sighting shots. Afterwards, the Chief Range Officer gives the command "match firing, start", indicating the start of the competition time. 60 competition shots must be shot within a 75-minute period time (90 minutes if no electronic targets are available). The 60 shots are usually organized in 6 ten-shot series for display on scoreboards.

=== Final ===
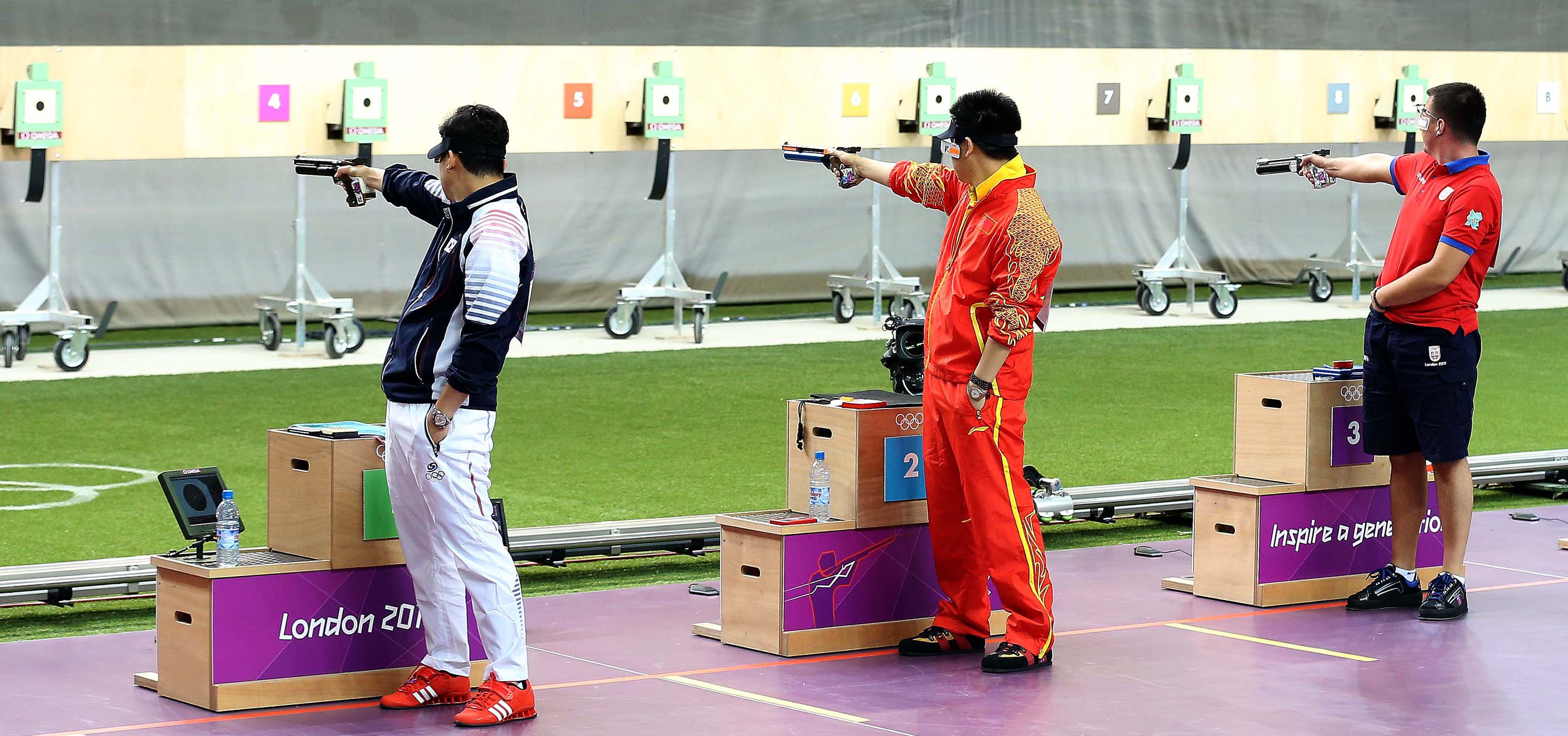
Men's 10 meter air pistol final in the 2012 Olympic Games Shooting competition at the Royal Artillery Barracks.

The top eight shooters in the qualification round advance to the final. Often, many shooters have the same score. The higher number of inner tens is the first tiebreaker. If two or more shooters have the same number of inner tens, the shooter with the highest score in the last ten-shot series is placed higher.

During the final, the score zones are divided into tenths (by means of a special gauge, in the absence of automatic scoring devices), so that each hit can give up to 10.9 points instead of the maximum 10 during the qualification. Electronic targets are required by the ISSF for finals at the Olympic Games, ISSF World Cups and ISSF World Championships.

After a five-minute sighting shot period and the presentation of the athletes to the audience, the athletes have 250 seconds to shoot five shots after the command "for the first competition series, load, start". The same command is given again for a second five shot series. After the tenth shot, separate commands are given for each competition shot with a time limit of 50 seconds per shot. After each two shots, the athlete with the lowest score is eliminated until two shooters are left to compete for the first place in the 23rd and 24th shot.

Current rules were introduced in 2017 after the 2016 Summer Olympics.

== History ==
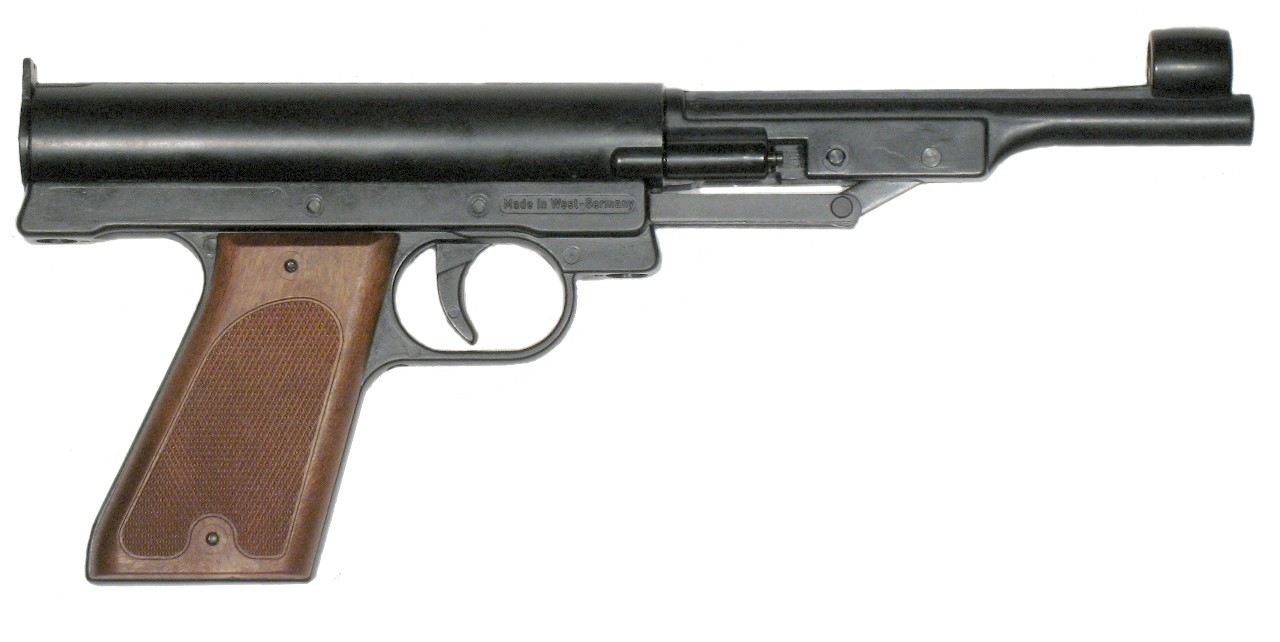
Spring-piston air guns were in common use during the first decades of the sport, but are now seldom seen at high levels.

The air pistol event was introduced on the World Championship level in 1970, and on the Olympic programme in 1988. Before 1985, when finals began to be used, championships were decided by the results of the 40 or 60 shot match (40 for women and 60 for men). Before 1982, the men's match also consisted of 40 shots.

As in many other ISSF events, the target for air pistol was reduced in size in 1989, also lowering the scores (although not by much), and thereby resetting all records. The development after this shows a contrast to that of air rifle shooting: whereas in air rifle the winning score of the 1989 World Championships would not have reached the final 17 years later, the same result increase has not occurred in air pistol. Sergei Pyzhianov's world record of 593 points, set in the first World Cup Final with the new targets, remained unbeaten for almost 20 years until Jin Jong-oh set a new one with 594 points in at the ISSF World Cup Changwon 2009.

Although competitions are no longer held outdoors, the most important competitions (Olympics, World Championships, World Cups) are still scheduled for the Northern Hemisphere summer season because they are combined with outdoor events such as 50m rifle and 25m pistol events. Many lesser international events, however, are held during the European indoor season between October and March, culminating in the European Championships each year. Most of these competitions are multi-day events held together with air rifle matches.

== World Championships, Men ==
Year	Place	Gold	Silver	Bronze
1970	(United States) Phoenix	Kornel Marosvari (HUN)	Vladimir Stolipin (URS)	Harald Vollmar (GDR)
1974	(Switzerland) Thun	Grigori Kosych (URS)	Corneliu Ion (ROM)	Jean Faggion (FRA)
1978	(South Korea) Seoul	Paavo Palokangas (FIN)	Seppo Saarenpää (FIN)	Paulo Lamego (BRA)
1979	(South Korea) Seoul	Geoffrey Robinson (GBR)	Thomas Guinn (CAN)	Ragnar Skanåker (SWE)
1981	(Dominican Republic) Santo Domingo	Don Nygord (USA)	Ljubtcho Diakov (BUL)	Ragnar Skanåker (SWE)
1982	(Venezuela) Caracas	Vladas Turla (URS)	Alexsander Melentiev (URS)	Anatoli Egrishin (URS)
1983	(Austria) Innsbruck	Ragnar Skanåker (SWE)	Alexsander Melentiev (URS)	Anatoli Egrishin (URS)
1985	Mexico City	Rolf Beutler (SUI)	Jens Potteck (GDR)	Pierre Brémond (FRA)
1986	(East Germany) Suhl	Igor Basinski (URS)	Uwe Potteck (GDR)	Pierre Brémond (FRA)
1987	(Hungary) Budapest	Zoltán Papanitz (HUN)	Alexsander Melentiev (URS)	Ljubtcho Diakov (BUL)
1989	(Socialist Federal Republic of Yugoslavia) Sarajevo	Sergei Pyzhianov (URS)	Uwe Potteck (GDR)	Sorin Babii (ROM)
1990	(Soviet Union) Moscow	Bernardo Tovar (COL)	István Ágh (HUN)	Boris Kokorev (URS)
1991	(Norway) Stavanger	Uwe Potteck (GER)	Yifu Wang (CHN)	Sorin Babii (ROM)
1994	(Italy) Milan	Franck Dumoulin (FRA)	Igor Basinski (BLR)	Roberto Di Donna (ITA)
1998	(Spain) Barcelona	Yifu Wang (CHN)	Igor Basinski (BLR)	Kanstantsin Lukashyk (BLR)
2002	(Finland) Lahti	Mikhail Nestruev (RUS)	Andrija Zlatić (YUG)	Franck Dumoulin (FRA)
2006	(Croatia) Zagreb	Pang Wei (CHN)	Jakkrit Panichpatikum (THA)	Vladimir Gontcharov (RUS)
2010	(Germany) Munich	Tomoyuki Matsuda (JPN)	Andrija Zlatić (SRB)	Jin Jong-oh (KOR)
2014	(Spain) Granada	Jin Jong-oh (KOR)	Yusuf Dikeç (TUR)	Vladimir Gontcharov (RUS)
2018	(South Korea) Changwon	Jin Jong-oh (KOR)	Artem Chernousov (RUS)	Lee Dae-myung (KOR)
2022	(Egypt) Cairo	Liu Jinyao (CHN)	Zhang Yifan (CHN)	Pavlo Korostylov (UKR)
2023	(Azerbaijan) Baku	Zhang Bowen (CHN)	Damir Mikec (SRB)	Kiril Kirov (BUL)
2025	(Egypt) Cairo	Samrat Rana (IND)	Hu Kai (CHN)	Varun Tomar (IND)
2026	(Qatar) Doha	Hu Kai (CHN)	Jaypal Malviya (IND)	Jindřich Dubový (CZE)

== World Championships, Men's Team ==
Year	Place	Gold	Silver	Bronze
1970	(United States) Phoenix	(Soviet Union) Soviet Union; Anatoli Egrishin; Grigori Kosych; Evgeni Raskazov; Vladimir Stolipin	(Finland) Finland; Immo Huhtinen; Seppo Makinen; Matti Juhani Patteri; Seppo Saarenpää	(West Germany) West Germany; Heinrich Fretwurst; Heinz Mertel; Ernst Mueller; Manfred Moeller
1974	(Switzerland) Thun	(Soviet Union) Soviet Union; Anatoli Egrishin; Grigori Kosych; Valeri Margasov; Vladimir Stolipin	(West Germany) West Germany; Manfred Deichmann; Heinrich Fretwurst; Dieter Gruetz; Wolfgang Labenski	(East Germany) East Germany; Helmut Artelet; Heinz Szurlies; Matthias Hoeflitz; Harald Vollmar
1978	(South Korea) Seoul	(Finland) Finland; Teemu Anttila; Seppo Mäkinen; Paavo Palokangas; Seppo Saarenpää	(Brazil) Brazil; Paulo Lamego; Wilson Scheidemantel; Benevenuto Tilli; Bertino Souza	(Sweden) Sweden; Weith Andersson; Ove Gunnarsson; Staffan Oscarsson; Ragnar Skanåker
1979	(South Korea) Seoul	(Sweden) Sweden; Weith Andersson; Stig Borje Nilsson; Staffan Oscarsson; Ragnar Skanåker	United States; Jimmie Dorsey; Don Hamilton; Samual Hunter; Don Nygord	(South Korea) South Korea; Jang Sik Kim; Won Suk Lee; Tae Ho Lim; Seung Lin Park
1981	(Dominican Republic) Santo Domingo	(Bulgaria) Bulgaria; Ljubtcho Diakov; Liubcho Dimitrov; Ivan Mandov; Jean Mihov	(Switzerland) Switzerland; Rolf Beutler; Roman Burkhard; Jacques Alain Perrin; Rene von Gunten	(Soviet Union) Soviet Union; Igor Basinski; Anatoli Egrishin; Alexander Sniezhko; Sergei Sumatokhin
1982	(Venezuela) Caracas	(Soviet Union) Soviet Union; Anatoli Egrishin; Alexsander Melentiev; Sergei Sumatokhin; Vladas Turla	United States; Erich Buljung; Jimmie Mc Coy; Don Nygord; Darius Young	(Sweden) Sweden; Weith Andersson; Stig Borje Nilsson; Benny Oestlund; Ragnar Skanåker
1983	(Austria) Innsbruck	(Soviet Union) Soviet Union; Anatoli Egrishin; Alexsander Melentiev; Vladas Turla	(Sweden) Sweden; Benny Oestlund; Staffan Oscarsson; Ragnar Skanåker	France; Jean Bilon; Jacky Durand; Remy Harang
1985	Mexico City	(Soviet Union) Soviet Union; Anatoli Egrishin; Boris Kokorev; Vladas Turla	France; Pierre Brémond; Philippe Cola; Remy Harang	United States; George Ross; Arnold Vitarbo; Darius Young
1986	(East Germany) Suhl	(Soviet Union) Soviet Union; Igor Basinski; Boris Kokorev; Alexsander Melentiev	France; Pierre Brémond; Philippe Cola; Remy Harang	(East Germany) East Germany; Gernot Eder; Jens Potteck; Uwe Potteck
1987	(Hungary) Budapest	(Soviet Union) Soviet Union; Anatoli Egrishin; Boris Kokorev; Alexsander Melentiev	(East Germany) East Germany; Gernot Eder; Jens Potteck; Uwe Potteck	(Bulgaria) Bulgaria; Ljubtcho Diakov; Tanyu Kiryakov; Sabi Sabev
1989	(Socialist Federal Republic of Yugoslavia) Sarajevo	(Soviet Union) Soviet Union; Sergei Barmin; Alexsander Melentiev; Sergei Pyzhianov	(Italy) Italy; Roberto Di Donna; Dario Palazzani; Vincenzo Spilotro	(Hungary) Hungary; Csaba Gyorik; Zsolt Karacs; Zoltán Papanitz
1990	(Soviet Union) Moscow	(Soviet Union) Soviet Union; Boris Kokorev; Mikhail Nestruev; Sergei Pyzhianov	(Hungary) Hungary; István Ágh; Csaba Gyorik; Zoltán Papanitz	(East Germany) East Germany; Gernot Eder; Uwe Potteck; Jens Potteck
1991	(Norway) Stavanger	(Soviet Union) Soviet Union; Sergei Barmin; Boris Kokorev; Sergei Pyzhianov	(Germany); Gernot Eder; Hans-Juergen Bauer-Neumaier; Uwe Potteck	(China); Jinbao Li; Yifu Wang; Haifeng Xu
1994	(Italy) Milan	(China); Haifeng Xu; Yifu Wang; Shengge Zhang	(Italy) Italy; Vigilio Fait; Roberto Di Donna; Vincenzo Spilotro	(Hungary) Hungary; Csaba Gyorik; Zsolt Karacs; Zoltán Papanitz
1998	(Spain) Barcelona	(China); Yifu Wang; Dan Xu; Hui Wu	(Russia) Russia; Mikhail Nestruev; Vladimir Gontcharov; Boris Kokorev	(Belarus) Belarus; Igor Basinski; Kanstantsin Lukashyk; Siarhei Yurusau
2002	(Finland) Lahti	(Russia) Russia; Mikhail Nestruev; Vladimir Gontcharov; Vladimir Isakov	(China); Yifu Wang; Zongliang Tan; Huaiyu Li	(Ukraine) Ukraine; Oleg Dronov; Victor Makarov; Ivan Rybovalov
2006	(Croatia) Zagreb	(China); Wei Pang; Zhongzai Lin; Zongliang Tan	(Russia) Russia; Mikhail Nestruev; Vladimir Isakov; Vladimir Gontcharov	France; Walter Lapeyre; Manuel Alexandre-Augrand; Franck Dumoulin
2010	(Germany) Munich	(Russia) Russia; Sergey Chervyakovskiy; Leonid Ekimov; Vladimir Isakov	(Serbia) Serbia; Andrija Zlatić; Damir Mikec; Dimitrije Grgic	(South Korea) South Korea; Jin Jong-oh; Lee Dae-myung; Han Seung Woo
2014	(Spain) Granada	China; Pang Wei; Pu Qifeng; Wang Zhiwei	South Korea; Jin Jong-oh; Kim Cheong-Yong; Lee Dae-myung	Russia; Vladimir Gontcharov; Vladimir Isakov; Sergey Chervyakovskiy
2018	(South Korea) Changwon	South Korea; Lee Dae-myung; Jin Jong-oh; Han Seung-woo	India; Abhishek Verma; Om Prakash Mitharwal; Shahzar Rizvi	Russia; Artem Chernousov; Denis Koulakov; Anton Gourianov
2022	(Egypt) New Administrative Capital	China; Liu Jinyao; Zhang Bowen; Zhang Yifan	Iran; Mohammad Rasoul Effati; Javad Foroughi; Sajjad Pourhosseini	Korea; Lee Woon-ho; Lee Dae-myung; Park Dae-hun

== World Championships, Women ==
Year	Place	Gold	Silver	Bronze
1970	(United States) Phoenix	Sally Carroll (USA)	Nina Rasskazova (URS)	Nina Stolyarova (URS)
1974	(Switzerland) Thun	Zinaida Simonian (URS)	Anisoara Matei (ROM)	Nina Stolyarova (URS)
1978	(South Korea) Seoul	Kerstin Hansson (SWE)	Gun Naesman (SWE)	Yang Ja Moon (KOR)
1979	(South Korea) Seoul	Ruby Fox (USA)	Patricia Dench (AUS)	Sally Carroll (USA)
1981	(Dominican Republic) Santo Domingo	Nonna Kalinina (URS)	Kerstin Bodin (SWE)	Marina Dobrantcheva (URS)
1982	(Venezuela) Caracas	Marina Dobrantcheva (URS)	Auksne Treinite (URS)	Inna Rose (URS)
1983	(Austria) Innsbruck	Kerstin Bodin (SWE)	Julita Macur (POL)	Yang Ja Kim (KOR)
1985	Mexico City	Marina Dobrantcheva (URS)	Irada Ashumova (URS)	Maritha Karlsson (SWE)
1986	(East Germany) Suhl	Anke Voelker (GDR)	Marina Dobrantcheva (URS)	Haiying Liu (CHN)
1987	(Hungary) Budapest	Jasna Šekarić (YUG)	Svetlana Smirnova (URS)	Anne Goffin (BEL)
1989	(Socialist Federal Republic of Yugoslavia) Sarajevo	Nino Salukvadze (URS)	Jasna Šekarić (YUG)	Lieselotte Breker (FRG)
1990	(Soviet Union) Moscow	Jasna Šekarić (YUG)	Marina Logvinenko (URS)	Svetlana Smirnova (URS)
1991	(Norway) Stavanger	Marina Logvinenko (URS)	Shuanghong Li (CHN)	Margit Stein (GER)
1994	(Italy) Milan	(Federal Republic of Yugoslavia) Jasna Šekarić (IOP)	Margit Stein (GER)	Galina Belyayeva (KAZ)
1998	(Spain) Barcelona	Munkhbayar Dorjsuren (MGL)	Yoko Inada (JPN)	Lalita Yauhleuskaya (BLR)
2002	(Finland) Lahti	Olena Kostevych (UKR)	Nino Salukvadze (GEO)	Olga Kousnetsova (RUS)
2006	(Croatia) Zagreb	Natalia Paderina (RUS)	Jun Hu (CHN)	Viktoria Chaika (BLR)
2010	(Germany) Munich	Zorana Arunović (SRB)	Lalita Yauhleuskaya (AUS)	Viktoria Chaika (BLR)
2014	(Spain) Granada	Jung Jeehae (KOR)	Olena Kostevych (UKR)	Chiaying Wu (TPE)
2018	(South Korea) Changwon	Anna Korakaki (GRE)	Zorana Arunović (SRB)	Kim Bo-mi (KOR)
2022	(Egypt) New Administrative Capital	Lu Kaiman (CHN)	Anna Korakaki (GRE)	Zorana Arunovic (SRB)
2023	(Azerbaijan) Baku	Jiang Ranxin (CHN)	Anna Korakaki (GRE)	Li Xue (CHN)
2025	(Egypt) Cairo	Yao Qianxun (CHN)	Shing Ho Ching (HKG)	Qian Wei (CHN)
2026	(Qatar) Doha	Jiang Ranxin (CHN)	Yao Qianxun (CHN)	Veronika Major (HUN)

== World Championships, Women's Team ==
Year	Place	Gold	Silver	Bronze
1970	(United States) Phoenix	(Soviet Union) Soviet Union; Nina Stoliarova; Nina Rasskazova; Nadezda Ibragimova	(West Germany) West Germany; Ortrud Feickert; Karin Fitzner; Ruth Kasten	United States; Lucile Chambliss; Sally Carroll; Barbara Hile
1974	(Switzerland) Thun	(Soviet Union) Soviet Union; Zinaida Simonian; Nina Stoliarova; Galina Zarikova	United States; Sharon Best; Barbara Hile; Ruby Fox	(West Germany) West Germany; Karin Fitzner; Ruth Kasten; Ortrud Feickert
1978	(South Korea) Seoul	(Sweden) Sweden; Kerstin Hansson; Gun Näsman; Ingridh Strömqvist	(Australia) Australia; Julie Aitken; Patricia Dench; Maureen Hill	(South Korea) South Korea; Kwan Seok Kang; Yang Ja Kim; Yang Ja Moon
1979	(South Korea) Seoul	United States; Sally Carroll; Ruby Fox; Patricin Olsowsky	(Sweden) Sweden; Kerstin Hansson; Gun Naesman; Sally Remmert	(United Kingdom) Great Britain; Carol Bartlett; Rosemarie Edgar; Trudy Henry
1981	(Dominican Republic) Santo Domingo	(Soviet Union) Soviet Union; Marina Dobrantcheva; Nonna Kalinina; Zinaida Simonian	(Switzerland) Switzerland; Veronica Edelmann; Doris Hafen; Elisabeth Sager	United States; Carol Baker; Ruby Fox; Sally Carroll
1982	(Venezuela) Caracas	(Soviet Union) Soviet Union; Marina Dobrantcheva; Inna Rose; Auksne Treinite	(China); Jianmin Gao; Yi Nang; Zhifang Wen	(Sweden) Sweden; Monica Aberg; Chris Johansson; Gun Naesman
1983	(Austria) Innsbruck	(Sweden) Sweden; Monica Aberg; Kerstin Bodin; Sally Remmert	(Austria) Austria; Corinna Hoffmann; Christine Strahalm; Christa Werk	United States; Sally Carroll; Ruby Fox; Cathy Graham
1985	Mexico City	(Soviet Union) Soviet Union; Irada Ashumova; Marina Dobrantcheva; Inna Rose	(Sweden) Sweden; Kerstin Bodin; Britt Marie Ellis; Maritha Karlsson	(West Germany) West Germany; Angelika Hermann; Kirsten Steinert; Margit Stein
1986	(East Germany) Suhl	(Soviet Union) Soviet Union; Marina Dobrantcheva; Irina Kotcherova; Lalita Tsvetkova	(East Germany) East Germany; Diana Mueller; Heidrun Richter; Anke Voelker	(Sweden) Sweden; Kerstin Bodin; Britt Marie Ellis; Maritha Karlsson
1987	(Hungary) Budapest	(Soviet Union) Soviet Union; Nino Salukvadze; Svetlana Smirnova; Lalita Tsvetkova	(Poland) Poland; Dorota Bidolach; Maria Janicka-Janda; Julita Macur	(West Germany) West Germany; Lieselotte Breker; Anetta Kalinowski; Margit Stein
1989	(Socialist Federal Republic of Yugoslavia) Sarajevo	(West Germany) West Germany; Lieselotte Breker; Anetta Kalinowski; Margit Stein	(Soviet Union) Soviet Union; Olga Shilenok; Nino Salukvadze; Svetlana Smirnova	(Hungary) Hungary; Agnes Ferencz; Anna Gonczi; Marta Kotroczo
1990	(Soviet Union) Moscow	(Soviet Union) Soviet Union; Marina Logvinenko; Nino Salukvadze; Svetlana Smirnova	(West Germany) Federal Republic of Germany; Lieselotte Breker; Monika Schilleder; Margit Stein	(Bulgaria) Bulgaria; Mariya Grozdeva; Margarita Shkodrova; Tania Staneva
1991	(Norway) Stavanger	(Soviet Union) Soviet Union; Olga Klochneva; Marina Logvinenko; Nino Salukvadze	(Germany); Lieselotte Breker; Margit Stein; Anke Voelker	(Socialist Federal Republic of Yugoslavia) Yugoslavia; Ksenja Macek; Jasna Šekarić; Mirela Skoko
1994	(Italy) Milan	(China); Xiaoping Fan; Duihong Li; Ge Ma	(Bulgaria) Bulgaria; Diana Iorgova; Mariya Grozdeva; Tania Staneva	(Germany); Doreen Mueller; Margit Stein; Anke Voelker
1998	(Spain) Barcelona	(Russia) Russia; Galina Beliaeva; Svetlana Smirnova; Marina Logvinenko	(China); Yeqing Cai; Jie Ren; Luna Tao	(Germany); Carmen Meininger; Margit Stein; Anke Schumann
2002	(Finland) Lahti	(Russia) Russia; Olga Kousnetsova; Svetlana Smirnova; Galina Beliaeva	(Belarus) Belarus; Viktoria Chaika; Liudmila Chabatar; Yuliya Alipava	(China); Luna Tao; Ying Chen; Jie Ren
2006	(Croatia) Zagreb	(China); Jun Hu; Fengji Fei; Ying Chen	(Belarus) Belarus; Viktoria Chaika; Liudmila Chabatar; Yauheniya Haluza	(Russia) Russia; Natalia Paderina; Olga Kousnetsova; Svetlana Smirnova
2010	(Germany) Munich	(Australia) Australia; Lalita Yauhleuskaya; Dina Aspandiyarova; Linda Ryan	(South Korea) South Korea; Lee Ho-Lim; Kim Byung-Hee; Park Min-Jin	(China); Guo Wenjun; Su Yuling; Zhang Jingjing
2014	(Spain) Granada	Serbia; Jasna Šekarić; Bobana Veličković; Zorana Arunović	China; Guo Wenjun; Zhang Mengyuan; Zhou Qingyuan	Hungary; Renáta Tobai-Sike; Zsófia Csonka; Adrienn Nemes
2018	(South Korea) Changwon	China; Jiang Ranxin; Wang Qian; Ji Xiaojing	South Korea; Kim Min-jung; Kim Bo-mi; Kwak Jung-hye	Russia; Vitalina Batsarashkina; Margarita Lomova; Svetlana Medvedeva
2022	(Egypt) New Administrative Capital	China; Jiang Ranxin; Li Xue Yan; Lu Kaiman	India; Palak Palak; Rhythm Sangwan; Yuvika Tomar	Iran; Mina Ghorbani; Hanieh Rostamian; Golnoush Sebghatollahi

== World Championships, Mixed Team ==
Year	Place	Gold	Silver	Bronze
2018	(South Korea) Changwon	Russia; Vitalina Batsarashkina; Artem Chernousov	China; Wang Qian; Wang Mengyi	Ukraine; Olena Kostevych; Oleh Omelchuk
2022	(Egypt) New Administrative Capital	Austria; Sylvia Steiner; Richard Zechmeister	Korea; Yoo Hyun-young; Park Dae-hun	Iran; Hanieh Rostamian; Javad Foroughi China; Jiang Ranxin; Zhang Bowen

== World Championships, total medals ==
Rank	Nation	Gold	Silver	Bronze	Total
1	Soviet Union	29	11	9	49
2	China	7	6	4	17
3	Sweden	6	5	7	18
4	Russia	6	2	3	11
5	United States	4	3	5	12
6	Yugoslavia	3	2	1	6
7	Hungary	2	2	3	7
8	Finland	2	2	0	4
9	East Germany	1	5	4	10
10	West Germany	1	3	5	9
11	Germany	1	3	3	7
12	Australia	1	3	0	4
13	France	1	2	6	9
14	Bulgaria	1	2	3	6
15	Serbia	1	2	0	3
15	Switzerland	1	2	0	3
17	South Korea	1	1	6	8
18	Georgia	1	1	0	2
18	Japan	1	1	0	2
20	Great Britain	1	0	1	2
20	Ukraine	1	0	1	2
22	Colombia	1	0	0	1
22	Mongolia	1	0	0	1
24	Belarus	0	4	5	9
25	Romania	0	2	2	4
26	Italy	0	2	1	3
27	Poland	0	2	0	2
28	Brazil	0	1	1	2
29	Austria	0	1	0	1
29	Canada	0	1	0	1
29	India	0	1	0	1
29	Thailand	0	1	0	1
33	Belgium	0	0	1	1
33	Kazakhstan	0	0	1	1
Totals (34 entries)		74	73	72	219

== Current world records ==
Current world records in 10 metre air pistol
Men	Qualification	594	Jin Jong-oh (KOR)	April 12, 2009	Changwon (KOR)
Men	Final	246.5	Kim Song Guk (PRK)	November 11, 2019	Doha (QAT)
Men	Teams	1759	Russia (Isakov, Nestruyev, Yekimov); China (Wang, Pang, Mai)	March 16, 2007; March 9, 2014	Deauville (FRA); Kuwait City (KUW)
Junior Men	Individual	588	Leonid Yekimov (RUS); Lukas Grunder (SUI)	March 16, 2007; May 24, 2009	Deauville (FRA); Milan (ITA)
Junior Men	Final	246.3	Saurabh Chaudhary (IND)	May 27, 2019	Munich (GER)
Junior Men	Teams	1732	South Korea (Lim, Sung, Shin)	September 6, 2018	Changwon (KOR)
Women	Qualification	591	Jiang Ranxin (CHN)	Oct 15, 2022	Cairo (EGY)
Women	Final	246.9	Zorana Arunović (SRB)	March 11, 2017	ECH Maribor (SLO)
Women	Teams	1739	China (Jiang, Wang, Ji)	September 4, 2018	Changwon (KOR)
Junior Women	Individual	585	Julieta Mautone (URU)	May 29, 2019	Munich (GER)
Junior Women	Final	244.7	Manu Bhaker (IND)	November 21, 2019	Putian (CHN)
Junior Women	Teams	1721	India (Singh, Raghav, Tomar)	November 7, 2019	Doha (QAT)
Mixed Team	Qualification	586	Manu Bhaker (IND); Saurabh Chaudhary (IND)	May 30, 2019	Munich (GER)
Junior Mixed Team	Qualification	586	Manu Bhaker (IND); Saurabh Chaudhary (IND)	May 30, 2019	Munich (GER)

== Olympic and World Champions ==
The ISSF publishes lists of historical champions.

=== Men ===
A green background indicates the Olympic champion.

Year	Venue	Individual	Team		
1970	Phoenix	Kornel Marosvari (HUN)	Soviet Union		
1974	Thun	Grigori Kosych (URS)	Soviet Union		
1978	Seoul	Paavo Palokangas (FIN)	Finland		
1979	Seoul	Geoffrey Robinson (GBR)	Sweden		
1981	Santo Domingo	Don Nygord (USA)	Bulgaria		
1982	Caracas	Vladas Turla (URS)	Soviet Union		
1983	Innsbruck	Ragnar Skanåker (SWE)	Soviet Union		
1985	Mexico City	Rolf Beutler (SUI)	Soviet Union		
1986	Suhl	Igor Basinski (URS)	Soviet Union		
1987	Budapest	Zoltán Papanitz (HUN)	Soviet Union	Junior Men	
1988	Seoul	Tanyu Kiryakov (BUL)		Individual	Team
1989	Sarajevo	Sergei Pyzhianov (URS)	Soviet Union	Andrei Kandikov (URS)	Hungary
1990	Moscow	Bernardo Tovar (COL)	Soviet Union		
1991	Stavanger	Uwe Potteck (GER)	Soviet Union	Kanstantsin Lukashyk (URS)	France
1992	Barcelona	Wang Yifu (CHN)			
1994	Milan	Franck Dumoulin (FRA)	China	Alexander Wiskepzev (RUS)	Hungary
1996	Atlanta	Roberto Di Donna (ITA)			
1998	Barcelona	Wang Yifu (CHN)	China	Teemu Tiainen (FIN)	Germany
2000	Sydney	Franck Dumoulin (FRA)			
2002	Lahti	Mikhail Nestruyev (RUS)	Russia	Denis Kulakov (RUS)	South Korea
2004	Athens	Wang Yifu (CHN)			
2006	Zagreb	Pang Wei (CHN)	China	Pu Qifeng (CHN)	China
2008	Beijing	Pang Wei (CHN)			
2010	Munich	Tomoyuki Matsuda (JPN)	Russia	Zhang Bin (CHN)	China
2012	London	Jin Jong-oh (KOR)			
2014	Granada	Jin Jong-oh (KOR)	China	Alexander Kindig (GER)	Latvia
2016	Rio de Janeiro	Hoàng Xuân Vinh (VIE)			
2018	Changwon	Jin Jong-oh (KOR)	South Korea	Saurabh Chaudhary (IND)	South Korea
2020	Tokyo	Javad Foroughi (IRI)			

=== Women ===
A green background indicates the Olympic champion.

Year	Venue	Individual	Team		
1970	Phoenix	Sally Carroll (USA)	Soviet Union		
1974	Thun	Zinaida Simonian (URS)			
1978	Seoul	Kerstin Hansson (SWE)	Sweden		
1979	Seoul	Ruby Fox (USA)	United States		
1981	Santo Domingo	Nonna Kalinina (URS)	Soviet Union		
1982	Caracas	Marina Dobrantcheva (URS)	Soviet Union		
1983	Innsbruck	Kerstin Bodin (SWE)	Sweden		
1985	Mexico City	Marina Dobrantcheva (URS)	Soviet Union		
1986	Suhl	Anke Völker (GDR)	Soviet Union		
1987	Budapest	Jasna Brajković (YUG)	Soviet Union	Junior Women	
1988	Seoul	Jasna Šekarić (YUG)		Individual	Team
1989	Sarajevo	Nino Salukvadze (URS)	West Germany	Mirosława Sagun-Lewandowska (POL)	Poland
1990	Moscow	Jasna Šekarić (YUG)	Soviet Union		
1991	Stavanger	Marina Logvinenko (URS)	Soviet Union	Stefanie Koch (GER)	France
1992	Barcelona	Marina Logvinenko (EUN)			
1994	Milan	Jasna Šekarić (YUG)	China	Karen Macary (FRA)	Denmark
1996	Atlanta	Olga Klochneva (RUS)			
1998	Barcelona	Dorjsürengiin Mönkhbayar (MGL)	Russia	Viktoria Chaika (BLR)	Hungary
2000	Sydney	Tao Luna (CHN)			
2002	Lahti	Olena Kostevych (UKR)	Russia	Katarzyna Szymanska (POL)	China
2004	Athens	Olena Kostevych (UKR)			
2006	Zagreb	Natalia Paderina (RUS)	China	Brankica Zarić (SRB)	China
2008	Beijing	Guo Wenjun (CHN)			
2010	Munich	Zorana Arunović (SRB)	Australia	Khongorzul Tsagaandalai (MGL)	South Korea
2012	London	Guo Wenjun (CHN)			
2014	Granada	Jung Jee-hae (KOR)	Serbia	Lin Yuemei (CHN)	Poland
2016	Rio de Janeiro	Zhang Mengxue (CHN)			
2018	Changwon	Anna Korakaki (GRE)	China	Sevval Ilayda Tarhan (TUR)	South Korea
2020	Tokyo	Vitalina Batsarashkina (ROC)			
2022	Cairo	Lu Kaiman (CHN)	China	Wang Siyu (CHN)	India
