= 1986 ISSF World Cup =

International sport shooting competition

1986 ISSF World Cup was the first edition of the ISSF World Cup, there were held six stages for the rifle and pistol events, and five stages for the shotgun events.

== Rifle, pistol and running target ==
=== Men's individual ===
10m Air Rifle
Stage	Venue	1st place, gold medalist(s)	2nd place, silver medalist(s)	3rd place, bronze medalist(s)
1	Mexico City	Hrachya Petikyan (URS)	Yuri Fedkin (URS)	Nicolas Berthelot (FRA)
2	(East Germany) Suhl	Jean-Pierre Amat (FRA)	Kirill Ivanov (URS)	Juri Zavolodko (URS)
3	(West Germany) Munich	Bernhard Süß (FRG)	Harald Stenvaag (NOR)	Frank Rettkowski (GDR)
4	(Switzerland) Zürich	Harald Stenvaag (NOR)	Andreas Wolfram (GDR)	André Kühni (SUI)
5	(Romania) Bucharest	Franck Badiou (FRA)	Ireneusz Jagodziński (POL)	Rajmond Debevec (YUG)
6	(South Korea) Seoul	Qiu Bo (CHN)	Lee Eun-chul (KOR)	Xu Xiaoguang (CHN)

50m Rifle 3 Positions
Stage	Venue	1st place, gold medalist(s)	2nd place, silver medalist(s)	3rd place, bronze medalist(s)
1	Mexico City	Daniel Durben (USA)	Hrachya Petikyan (URS)	Pascal Bessy (FRA)
2	(East Germany) Suhl	Andreas Wolfram (GDR)	Kirill Ivanov (URS)	Goran Maksimović (YUG)
3	(West Germany) Munich	Kurt Fitz-Randolph (USA)	Hellfried Heilfort (GDR)	Goran Maksimović (YUG)
4	(Switzerland) Zürich	Webster Wright III (USA)	Malcolm Cooper (GBR)	Andreas Wolfram (GDR)
5	(Romania) Bucharest	Jean-Pierre Amat (FRA)	Jiří Fritz (TCH)	Ireneusz Jagodziński (POL)
6	(South Korea) Seoul	Ryohei Koba (JPN)	Nam Hong-woo (KOR)	Zhang Yingzhou (CHN)

50m Rifle Prone
Stage	Venue	1st place, gold medalist(s)	2nd place, silver medalist(s)	3rd place, bronze medalist(s)
1	Mexico City	José Rosario Álvarez (MEX)	Michel Bury (FRA)	Mario Clopatofsky (COL)
2	(East Germany) Suhl	Pavel Soukenik (TCH)	Miroslav Varga (TCH)	Kåre Inge Viken (NOR)
3	(West Germany) Munich	Donald Brook (AUS)	Hannes Rainer (AUT)	Ireneusz Jagodziński (POL)
4	(Switzerland) Zürich	Pavel Soukenik (TCH)	Alister Allan (GBR)	Donald Brook (AUS)
5	(Romania) Bucharest	Hrachya Petikyan (URS)	Florin Christofor (ROU)	Pierre-Alain Dufaux (SUI)
6	(South Korea) Seoul	Cha Young-chul (KOR)	Xu Xiaoguang (CHN)	Zhang Yingzhou (CHN)

10m Air Pistol
Stage	Venue	1st place, gold medalist(s)	2nd place, silver medalist(s)	3rd place, bronze medalist(s)
1	Mexico City	Pierre Bremond (FRA)	Don Nygord (USA)	Alexander Melentyev (URS)
2	(East Germany) Suhl	Arndt Kaspar (FRG)	Sakari Paasonen (FIN)	Ljubtcho Diakov (BUL)
3	(West Germany) Munich	Gernot Eder (GDR)	Sakari Paasonen (FIN)	Sorin Babii (ROU)
4	(Switzerland) Zürich	Bernardo Tovar (COL)	Alfons Messerschmitt (FRG)	Gernot Eder (GDR)
5	(Romania) Bucharest	Ljubtcho Diakov (BUL)	Tamás Tóth (HUN)	Tanyu Kiryakov (BUL)
6	(South Korea) Seoul	Xu Haifeng (CHN)	Min Young-sam (KOR)	Mamoru Inagaki (JPN)

25m Rapid Fire Pistol
Stage	Venue	1st place, gold medalist(s)	2nd place, silver medalist(s)	3rd place, bronze medalist(s)
1	Mexico City	Oleg Tkachov (URS)	Bernardo Tovar (COL)	Afanasijs Kuzmins (URS)
2	(East Germany) Suhl	Adam Kaczmarek (POL)	Oleg Tkachov (URS)	Ralf Schumann (GDR)
3	(West Germany) Munich	Andrzej Macur (POL)	Ralf Schumann (GDR)	Jürgen Wiefel (GDR)
4	(Switzerland) Zürich	Ralf Schumann (GDR)	Jürgen Wiefel (GDR)	Břetislav Putna (TCH)
5	(Romania) Bucharest	Corneliu Ion (ROU)	Gianfranco Mantelli (ITA)	Csaba Hell (HUN)
6	(South Korea) Seoul	Li Zhongqi (CHN)	Park Jong-kil (KOR)	Lim Jang-soo (KOR)

50m Pistol
Stage	Venue	1st place, gold medalist(s)	2nd place, silver medalist(s)	3rd place, bronze medalist(s)
1	Mexico City	Alexander Melentyev (URS)	Remy Harang (FRA)	Igor Basinski (URS)
2	(East Germany) Suhl	Rolf Beutler (SUI)	Sergei Pyzhianov (URS)	Uwe Potteck (GDR)
3	(West Germany) Munich	Uwe Potteck (GDR)	Ragnar Skanåker (SWE)	Gernot Eder (GDR)
4	(Switzerland) Zürich	Uwe Potteck (GDR)	Paavo Palokangas (FIN)	Gernot Eder (GDR)
5	(Romania) Bucharest	Jerzy Pietrzak (POL)	Sorin Babii (ROU)	Carlos Hora (PER)
6	(South Korea) Seoul	Xu Haifeng (CHN)	Wang Yifu (CHN)	Gilbert King Hung U (HKG)

50m Running Target
Stage	Venue	1st place, gold medalist(s)	2nd place, silver medalist(s)	3rd place, bronze medalist(s)
1	Mexico City	Juri Kadenatsi (URS)	Helmut Bellingrodt (COL)	Jorge Rios (CUB)
2	(East Germany) Suhl	Sergei Luzov (URS)	András Doleschall (HUN)	Nicolai Lapin (URS)
3	(West Germany) Munich	Thomas Pfeffer (GDR)	Libor Tesař (TCH)	Jean-Luc Tricoire (FRA)

=== Women's individual ===
10m Air Rifle
Stage	Venue	1st place, gold medalist(s)	2nd place, silver medalist(s)	3rd place, bronze medalist(s)
1	Mexico City	Launi Meili (USA)	Mary Godlove (USA)	Iryna Shylava (URS)
2	(East Germany) Suhl	Vesela Letcheva (BUL)	Deena Wigger (USA)	Lenka Koloušková (TCH)
3	(West Germany) Munich	Sabina Toth (GDR)	Vesela Letcheva (BUL)	Leena Melartin Thune (FIN)
4	(Switzerland) Zürich	Dorothee Deuring (AUT)	Irène Dufaux Suter (SUI)	Martina Transchel (FRG)
5	(Romania) Bucharest	Vesela Letcheva (BUL)	Yvette Courault (FRA)	Lenka Koloušková (TCH)
6	(South Korea) Seoul	Park Jeong-ah (KOR)	Lee Hong-ki (KOR)	Soma Dutta (IND)

50m Rifle 3 Positions
Stage	Venue	1st place, gold medalist(s)	2nd place, silver medalist(s)	3rd place, bronze medalist(s)
1	Mexico City	Elaine Proffitt (USA)	Mary Godlove (USA)	Iryna Shylava (URS)
2	(East Germany) Suhl	Vesela Letcheva (BUL)	Kathrin Starkloff (GDR)	Anette Andersson (SWE)
3	(West Germany) Munich	Vesela Letcheva (BUL)	Selma Sonnet (FRG)	Mireille Maitre (SUI)
4	(Switzerland) Zürich	Dominique Esnault (FRA)	Kim Hogrefe (USA)	Marie Anne Wallace (USA)
5	(Romania) Bucharest	Vesela Letcheva (BUL)	Isabelle Heberle (FRA)	Temenujka Petrova (BUL)
6	(South Korea) Seoul	Zhou Danhong (CHN)	Soma Dutta (IND)	Jin Dong Xiang (CHN)

10m Air Pistol
Stage	Venue	1st place, gold medalist(s)	2nd place, silver medalist(s)	3rd place, bronze medalist(s)
1	Mexico City	Marina Dobrantcheva (URS)	Gail Liberty (USA)	Tanja Perez (CUB)
2	(East Germany) Suhl	Jasna Brajković (YUG)	Margit Stein (FRG)	Irada Ashumova (URS)
3	(West Germany) Munich	Jasna Brajković (YUG)	Kerstin Bodin (SWE)	Anke Völker (GDR)
4	(Switzerland) Zürich	Evelyne Manchon (FRA)	Kirsten Steinert (FRG)	Anke Völker (GDR)
5	(Romania) Bucharest	Anișoara Matei (ROU)	Jasna Brajković (YUG)	Marie Havlová (TCH)
6	(South Korea) Seoul	Tomoko Hasegawa (JPN)	Rampai Yamfang (THA)	Bang Hyun-joo (KOR)

25m Pistol
Stage	Venue	1st place, gold medalist(s)	2nd place, silver medalist(s)	3rd place, bronze medalist(s)
1	Mexico City	Marina Dobrantcheva (URS)	Elvira Salazar (COL)	Martine Guépin (FRA)
2	(East Germany) Suhl	Irada Ashumova (URS)	Yvonna Ježová (TCH)	Márta Kotroczó (HUN)
3	(West Germany) Munich	Ágnes Ferencz (HUN)	Anke Völker (GDR)	Britt-Marie Ellis (SWE)
4	(Switzerland) Zürich	Evelyne Manchon (FRA)	Linda Thom (CAN)	Carol Page (GBR)
5	(Romania) Bucharest	Márta Kotroczó (HUN)	Marina Kuteakina (URS)	Mirela Skoko (YUG)
6	(South Korea) Seoul	Wen Zhifang (CHN)	Tomoko Hasegawa (JPN)	Zhu Yugin (CHN)

== Shotgun ==
=== Men's individual ===
Trap
Stage	Venue	1st place, gold medalist(s)	2nd place, silver medalist(s)	3rd place, bronze medalist(s)
1	Mexico City	Luis Garrido (PUR)	Ken Blasi (USA)	Juan Torne (ESP)
2	(Italy) Montecatini	Albano Pera (ITA)	Miloslav Bednařík (TCH)	Oleksandr Lavrinenko (URS)
3	(Soviet Union) Moscow	Aleksandr Asanov (URS)	Oleksandr Lavrinenko (URS)	Marc Tosolini (FRA)
4	(East Germany) Suhl	George Leary (CAN)	Miloslav Bednařík (TCH)	Aleksandr Asanov (URS)
5	(South Korea) Seoul	Byun Kyung-soo (KOR)	Peter Lim Yack Chun (MAS)	Zhang Gang (CHN)

Skeet
Stage	Venue	1st place, gold medalist(s)	2nd place, silver medalist(s)	3rd place, bronze medalist(s)
1	Mexico City	Guillermo Alfredo Torres (CUB)	Servando Puldón (CUB)	Ignacio Lumbreras (ESP)
2	(Italy) Montecatini	Bernhard Hochwald (GDR)	Andrea Benelli (ITA)	Jan Hula (TCH)
3	(Soviet Union) Moscow	Luboš Adamec (TCH)	Guillermo Alfredo Torres (CUB)	Leoš Hlaváček (TCH)
4	(East Germany) Suhl	Axel Wegner (GDR)	Piotr Nowakowski (POL)	Servando Puldón (CUB)
5	(South Korea) Seoul	Zhang Weigang (CHN)	Wang Zhonghua (CHN)	Lim Dong-ki (KOR)

== Medal table ==
Rank	Nation	Gold	Silver	Bronze	Total
1	Soviet Union (URS)	10	8	10	28
2	East Germany (GDR)	9	6	10	25
3	France (FRA)	7	4	5	16
4	China (CHN)	7	3	6	16
5	Bulgaria (BUL)	6	1	3	10
6	United States (USA)	5	7	1	13
7	Czechoslovakia (TCH)	3	6	6	15
8	South Korea (KOR)	3	5	3	11
9	Poland (POL)	3	2	2	7
10	West Germany (FRG)	2	4	1	7
11	Hungary (HUN)	2	2	2	6
12	Romania (ROU)	2	2	1	5
13	Yugoslavia (YUG)	2	1	4	7
14	Japan (JPN)	2	1	1	4
15	Colombia (COL)	1	3	1	5
16	Cuba (CUB)	1	2	3	6
17	Italy (ITA)	1	2	0	3
18	Switzerland (SUI)	1	1	3	5
19	Norway (NOR)	1	1	1	3
20	Austria (AUT)	1	1	0	2
20	Canada (CAN)	1	1	0	2
22	Australia (AUS)	1	0	1	2
23	Mexico (MEX)	1	0	0	1
23	Puerto Rico (PUR)	1	0	0	1
25	Finland (FIN)	0	3	1	4
26	Sweden (SWE)	0	2	2	4
27	Great Britain (GBR)	0	2	1	3
28	India (IND)	0	1	1	2
29	Malaysia (MAS)	0	1	0	1
29	Thailand (THA)	0	1	0	1
31	Spain (ESP)	0	0	2	2
32	Hong Kong (HKG)	0	0	1	1
32	Peru (PER)	0	0	1	1
Totals (33 entries)		73	73	73	219
