= Yuvika Tomar =

Indian sport shooter

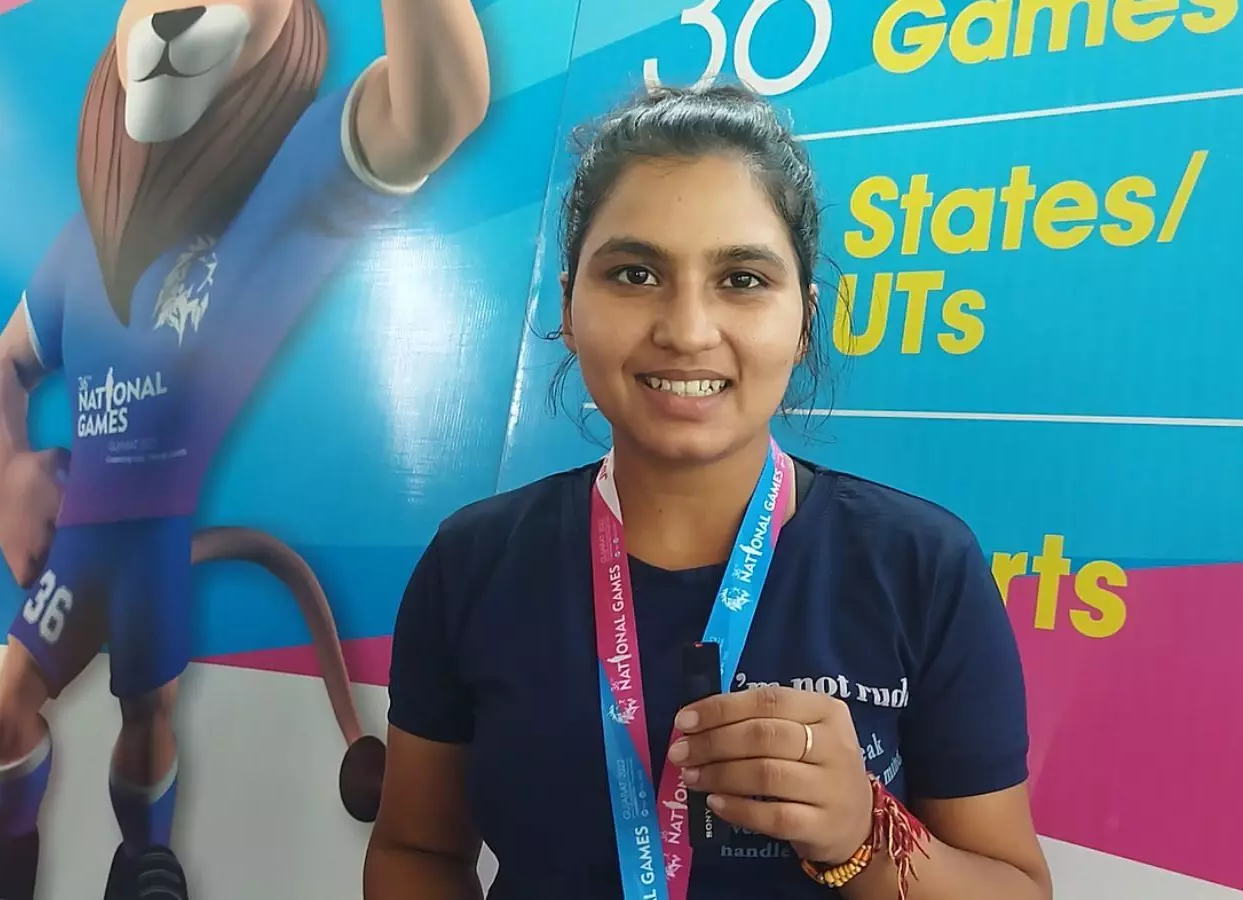
- Tomar at the 2022 National Games of India

Personal information
- Full name: Yuvika Tomar
- Nickname: YUVI
- Nationality: Indian
- Born: 6 July 2001 (age 25) Kheri (village), Baghpat, Uttar Pradesh, India
- Years active: 2016-present
- Height: 5 ft 2 in (157 cm)
- Weight: 58 kg (128 lb)
- Website: www.aryangateways.org

Sport
- Country: India
- Sport: pistol shooting
- University team: CCS University
- Club: VSRC (now as AGSF)
- Team: India Women Shooting Team
- Coached by: Amit Sheoran

Achievements and titles
- World finals: ISSF World Cup, 2022
- Regional finals: All India University, 2022
- National finals: National Games, 2022
Medal record
Women's shooting
Representing India
World Championships
Silver medal – second place	2022 Cairo	10m air pistol team
Asian Airgun Championships
Silver medal – second place	2022 Daegu	10 m air pistol team

Yuvika Tomar (born 6 July 2001) is an Indian sport shooter. She won the gold medal in the 2022 National Games of India in the 10 meter air pistol, making her the first female shooter representing Uttar Pradesh to win a gold medal at the national games.

== Early life ==
Tomar was born in Arifpur Kheri, a village in Bagpat district of western Uttar Pradesh. She comes from a family of farmers in the sugarcane belt of Yamuna–Gangetic plains of North India. Her father, Sh. Kiranpal Tomar, was paralyzed as she started her shooting carrier.

In 2017, at the Aryan Gateways Sports Foundation (AGSF), she chose Amit Sheoran as her coach. She wants to maintain the legacy of the foundation's Olympic shooters Deepender Singh and Arjun awardee Saurabh Chaudhary.

== Notable performances ==
- 2019 Asian Shooting Championships (Doha, Qatar) – silver medal as a junior woman shooter
- 2022 ISSF World Cup (Korea) – silver medal
- 2022 All India university games – gold medal
- 2022 Khelo India University Games (Bhopal) – gold medal
- 2022 National Games of India (Ahmadabad, Gujrat) – gold medal

== See also ==
- National Rifle Association of India (NRAI)
- International Shooting Sport Federation (ISSF)
- Sports Authority of India (SAI)
