= Karacs =

Karacs is a Hungarian surname.

- Teréz Karacs
- Zsolt Karacs
- Ferenc Karacs (1770–1838), Hungarian mapmaker and engraver

== See also ==
- Karács, the Hungarian name for Căraci, a village in Baia de Criș Commune, Hunedoara County, Romania
