= Baikal IZH-46M =

IZh-46
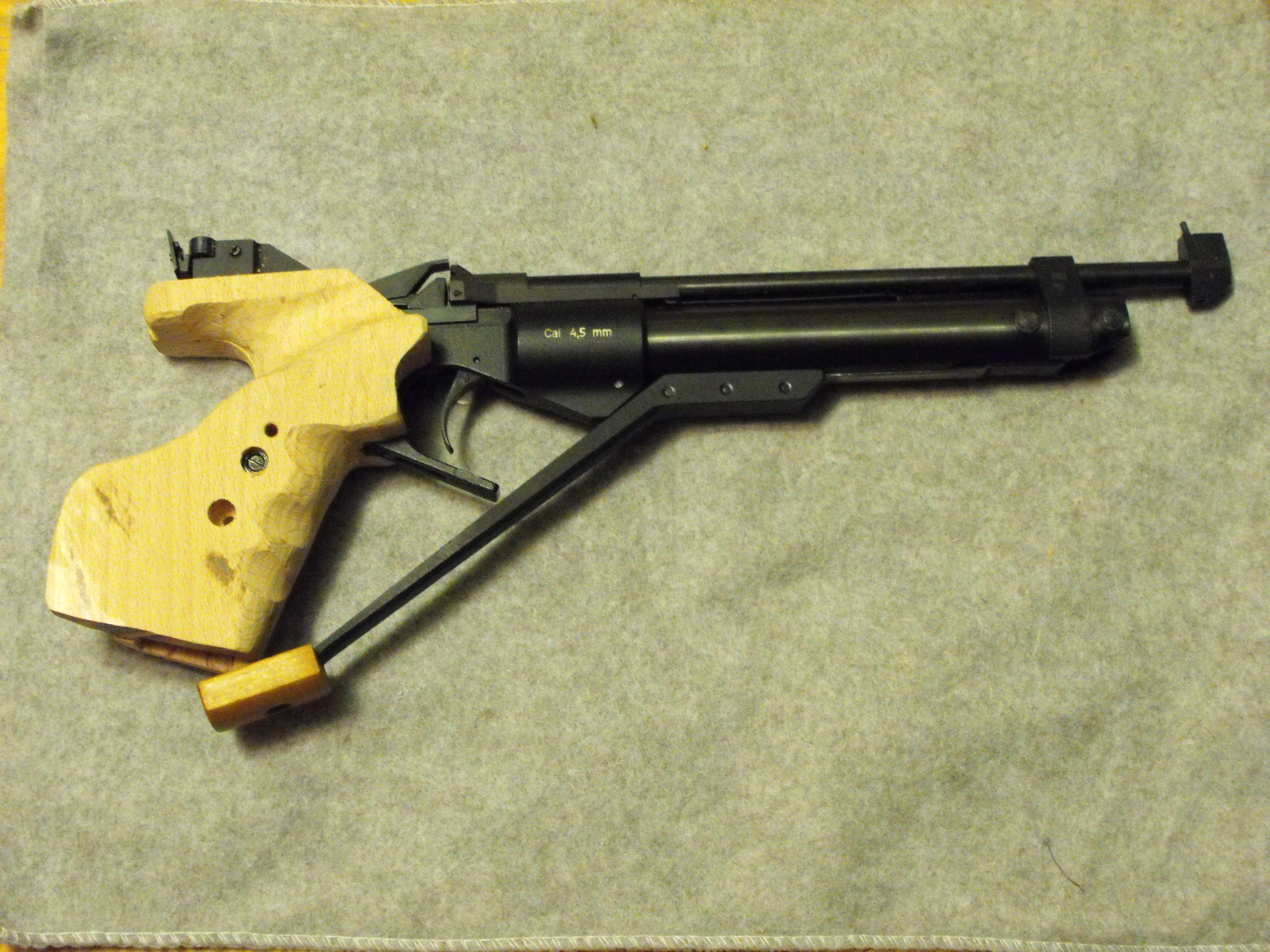
- Baikal IZH 46 pistol with left hand grips
- Type: Air pistol
- Place of origin: USSR

Production history
- Manufacturer: Izhevsk Mechanical Plant
- Variants: IZh-46, IZh-46M

Specifications
- Mass: 2.86 lb.
- Length: 16.53 in.
- Cartridge: Pellet
- Caliber: .177
- Action: Hinged Breech Action, pneumatic pump
- Rate of fire: Single shot
- Muzzle velocity: 470 feet per second (140 m/s)
- Sights: Open Micro Adjustable

The IZh-46M is a competition-grade, single-shot pneumatic air gun, with a hammer-forged, rifled barrel, designed for the 10 metre air pistol ISSF shooting events. The gun is charged with a single stroke of an underlever cocking arm.

Unlike guns intended only for plinking, several features of competition guns such as the IZh-46M mark it as designed for high-precision shooting. For instance, the IZH-46M's rear sight can be adjusted for windage/elevation, and the trigger is adjustable for position, travel, and pull. The gun can also be dry-fired without charging. The ergonomic grip features an adjustable handrest.

The IZh-46M is the current production run of the original Baikal IZH-46. The only visible and mechanical difference is the IZH-46M is built with a slightly longer (0.5" or 12 mm +/-) air compression cylinder. As all other components except chamber length and piston stroke are the same, visually the original IZH-46 barrel appears to extend further beyond the air compression cylinder than the current IZh-46M. The extra length of the air compression cylinder allows the 46M to have a 60 ft/s (18 m/s) increase in muzzle velocity over the original 46. The IZH-46M has a muzzle velocity of approximately 470 ft/s (140 m/s).

In either original IZH46 or current IZH46M form, the pistol is a very consistent shooting precision 10 m airgun.

Though more expensive than many commonly available airguns, the IZH-46M is inexpensive in comparison to many similarly featured competition guns.

In September 2008, all Izhevsk Mechanical Plant firearms and air guns were renamed and IZh-46M got the name MP-46M (Mechanical Plant-46M).

== Variants ==
- IZh-46 (ИЖ-46) - first model, since 1989
- IZh-46M (ИЖ-46М) - second model, since 1996
