= Amit Sheoran =

Indian pistol shooting sportsman

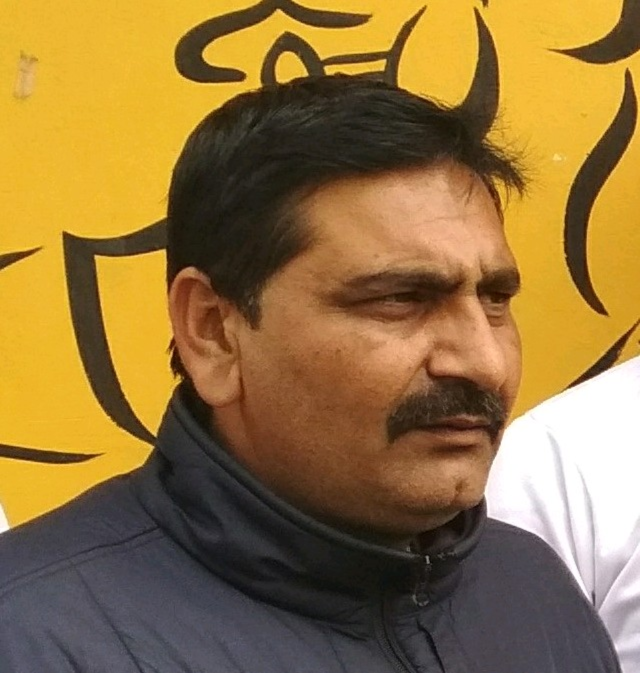
- Amit Sheoran

Personal information
- Full name: Amit Sheoran
- Nationality: Indian
- Born: 19 February 1978 (age 48) Angadpur, Baghpat, Uttar Pradesh, India
- Height: 5 ft 11 in (180 cm)
- Weight: 80 kg (176 lb)
- Parent: Rajendar Singh (father)

Sport
- Country: India
- Sport: Pistol shooting
- Club: Veer Sahamal Rifle Club by AGSF
- Partner: Rajiv Chauhan
- Coached by: Mahaboob Khan Pathan
- Now coaching: Since 2009

Amit Sheoran (born 19 February 1978 Angadpur, Baghpat, India) is a pistol shooting coach, who also competed at a national level, He had to leave shooting due to the death of his father. He has produced several national and international-level Indian pistol shooters. He has coached Saurabh Chaudhary.

== Early life ==
From around 1995, Amit Sheoran was coached by Mahboob Khan Pathan and entered state- and national-level events. In the beginning of his career Sheoran have to lose his father and entered in his era of struggle.

== Coaching career ==
In 2009 he started a tin-shed shooting range with five students, one air rifle and an old air pistol. The shed is named after a 1857 anti-British revolutionary. In 2016 the father of an old student gifted a small parcel of land - sufficient to allow a marginally larger shed (16x12 sqm) with, for the first time, a pair of fans.

== Journey to Olympics ==
Shooter Saurabh Chaudhary and Para shooter Deepender Singh took a step forward to shooting games in the 2021 Tokyo Olympics. From Tin-Shed Academy to Olympics coach he proved once again and also his shooter represented in World University Games and also Khelo India University games.

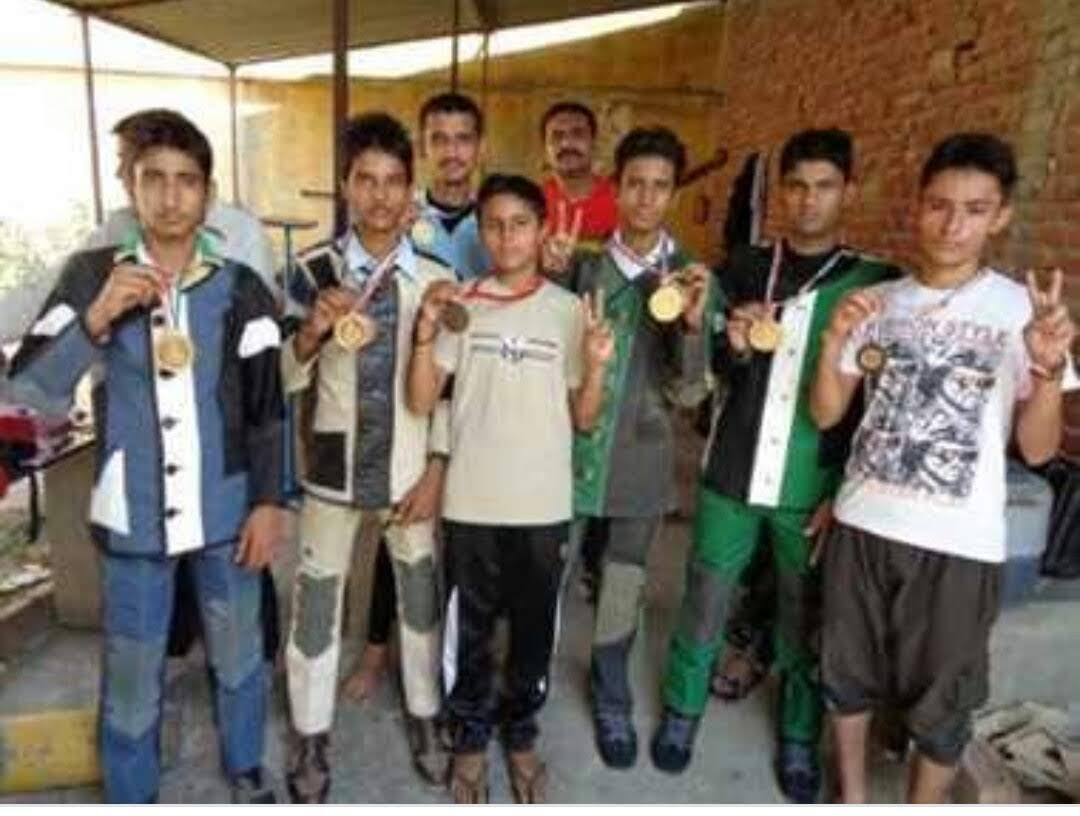
AGSF Founder Amit Sheoran as a coach of Shooting started from hot TIN-SHED and reached till Olympics 2020 Tokyo with Saurabh Chaudhary & Deepender Singh

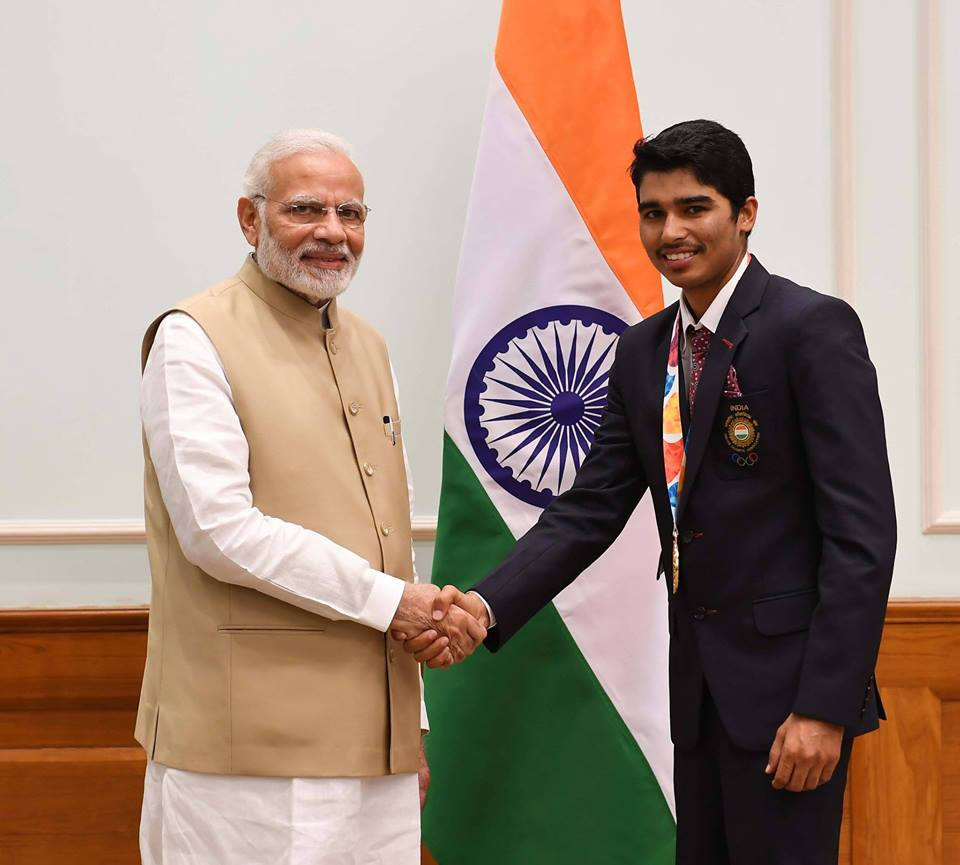
The Prime Minister, Shri Narendra Modi greeted Saurabh Chaudhary as Gold Medalist youth Olympian, in Delhi on October 21, 2018.

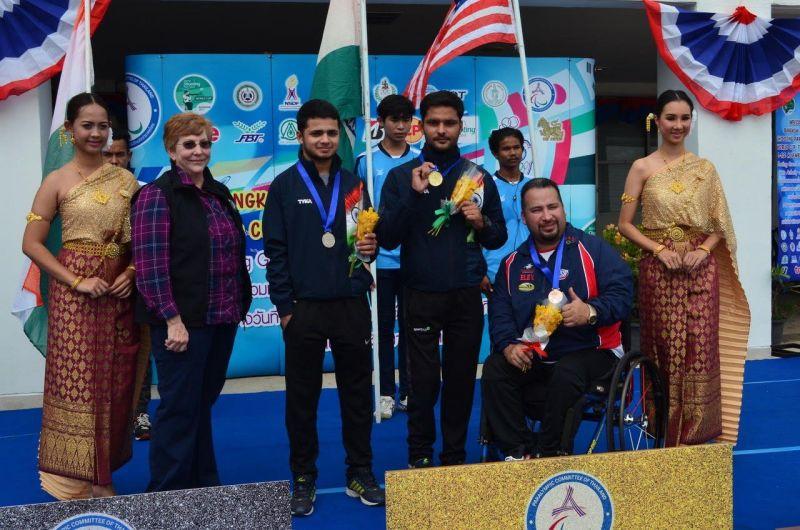
AGSF igniting Para Shooting with Gold Medal in Bangkok world cup 2017 by Deepender Singh

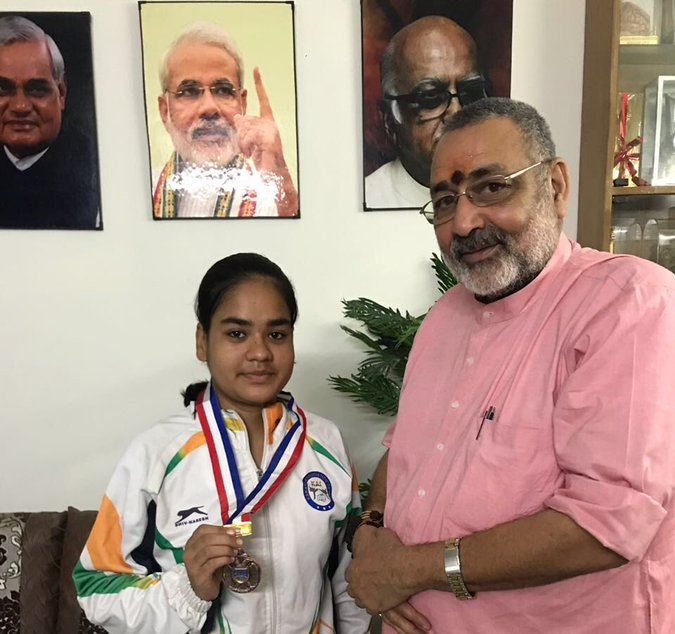
Sports girl from Bihar Ananya Anand greeted by Minister Giriraj Singh

== Notable Performance ==
=== 2018 ===
Saurabh Chaudhary became the youngest Indian shooter to win a gold medal at the Asian Games. He participated in the Youth Olympic Games 2018 in Argentina and won gold. He won three golds in the Asian Airgun Championship in 2018:the 10m air pistol competition, the team competition and in the mixed team 10m pistol.

=== 2019 ===
In February he won the gold medal at ISSF World Cup in Delhi.

In April, he participated in Mixed Team 10m pistol with Manu Bhaker and won gold at ISSF World Cup in Beijing

In May he won gold and broke the world and junior records in 10m pistol ISSF World Cup in Munich.

=== 2020 ===
In January 2020, he won 63rd gold at the 63rd National Shooting Championship in men's 10 metre air pistol.

2022

Khelo India University Games, 2022 Bhopal Gold in Men & Women both 10M Pistol Shooting Event.

National Games, 2022 Ahemdabad, Gold in women senior 10M Pistol Shooting event.

== Pupils and Students ==
- Saurabh Chaudhary - Gold medal in 2018 Asian Games,
- Monu Kumar is the athlete of TOPs scheme by Sports Authority of India.
- Yuvika Tomar is in TOPs scheme by Sports Authority of India (SAI).
- 62nd National Sh. Championship, 2018 Trivantpuram, Kerla got Five Gold & a Silver with record.
- ISSF World Cup, Delhi 2018 won Gold with "World record"
- Deepender Singh - Gold medal in 2017 World Shooting Para Sport World Cup

== See also ==
- Paralympic Committee of India
- National Rifle Association of India
- International Shooting sports Federation (ISSF)
- National Rifle association of India (NRAI)
