= Jung Jee-hae =

South Korean sport shooter (born 1989)

Personal information
- National team: South Korea
- Born: April 26, 1989 (age 37)

Sport
- Country: South Korea
- Sport: Shooting Sports
- Events: 10 meter air pistol; 25 meter pistol
Medal record
Women's shooting
Representing South Korea
World Championships
| Gold medal – first place | 2014 Granada | 10m Air Pistol |
Asian Games
| Silver medal – second place | 2014 Incheon | 10 Air Pistol |

Jung Jee-hae (born 26 April 1989) is a South Korean sports shooter who became the World Champion at the 2014 ISSF World Shooting Championships in the 10m Air Pistol event.

== Career ==
Jung's first international selection came in 2007, when she represented South Korea at the Asian Championships as a junior, competing in the 10m Air Pistol and 25m Pistol events.

In 2010 she was selected for the Sydney World Cup, where she finished fifth in the 10m Air Pistol.

In 2014, she won silver at the Asian Games in Incheon.

In September 2014, she became World Champion at the 2014 ISSF World Shooting Championships in Granada, beating 2004 Olympic Champion Olena Kostevych in a surprise upset.
