= Anetta Kalinowski =

German sports shooter

Personal information
- Nationality: German
- Born: 20 January 1963 (age 62); Łódź, Poland

Sport
- Sport: Sports shooting

Anetta Kalinowski (born 20 January 1963) is a German sports shooter. She competed in the women's 25 metre pistol event at the 1988 Summer Olympics.
