= Zoltán Papanitz =

Hungarian sports shooter

Personal information
- Nationality: Hungarian
- Born: 10 November 1966 (age 58); Salgótarján, Hungary

Sport
- Sport: Sports shooting

Zoltán Papanitz (born 10 November 1966) is a Hungarian sports shooter. He competed at the 1988 Summer Olympics, the 1992 Summer Olympics, and the 1996 Summer Olympics.
