= Tanya Staneva =

Bulgarian sports shooter

Personal information
- Nationality: Bulgarian
- Born: 30 December 1971 (age 53); Targovishte, Bulgaria

Sport
- Sport: Sports shooting

Tanya Staneva (born 30 December 1971) is a Bulgarian sports shooter. She competed in the women's 10 metre air pistol event at the 1992 Summer Olympics.
