= Paulo Lamego =

Brazilian sports shooter

Personal information
- Full name: Paulo Raulino Lamego
- Born: 26 May 1950 Rio de Janeiro, Brazil
- Died: 20 August 2012 (aged 62)
- Height: 177 cm (5 ft 10 in)
- Weight: 75 kg (165 lb)

Sport
- Sport: Shooting
Medal record
Representing Brazil
World Championships
Silver medal – second place	1978 Seoul	10 m air pistol team
Bronze medal – third place	1978 Seoul	10 m air pistol

Paulo Raulino Lamego (26 May 1950 – 20 August 2012) was a sports shooter, who represented Brazil at the 1976 Summer Olympics.

Lamego competed in the mixed 50 metre free pistol event at the 1976 Summer Olympics in Montreal, and after scoring 544 points he finished in 29th place.

Two years later Lamego competed in the 1978 ISSF World Shooting Championships in Seoul, South Korea, where he won the bronze medal in the 10 metre air pistol event and followed it up with a silver medal in the team event.
