= Hui Wu =

Chinese materials chemist

- 吴慧
- Education: Tsinghua University (BS, MS); University of Pennsylvania (PhD)
- Awards: Department of Commerce Bronze Medal (2017)
- Scientific career
- Fields: Materials chemistry
- Workplaces: University of Maryland, College Park; National Institute of Standards and Technology
- Thesis: Non-stoichiometric Ordered Perovskites for Microwave Applications (2005)
- Doctoral advisor: Peter K. Davies
- Other academic advisors: Feiyu Kang; Terrence J. Udovic

Hui Wu (Chinese: 吴慧; pinyin: Wú Huì) is a Chinese materials chemist and engineer. She is a senior scientist at the National Institute of Standards and Technology Center for Neutron Research. Wu researches the synthesis, structure, solid state chemistry, and properties of complex oxides and hydrides. She received the Department of Commerce Bronze Medal for producing an entirely new route to synthesizing hydrogen-storage materials for fuel cells based on the complex chemistry of amines and boranes.

== Education ==
In 1999, Wu completed a dual B.S. in materials science and engineering and environmental science and engineering at Tsinghua University (THU). In 2001, she earned a M.S. in materials science and engineering at THU. She conducted her master's thesis, Structure Characterization and Performance of Porous Chemical Adsorbents for Indoor-Air Purification under advisor Feiyu Kang. Wu completed a Ph.D. in materials science and engineering at University of Pennsylvania in 2005. Her dissertation was titled Non-stoichiometric Ordered Perovskites for Microwave Applications. Wu's doctoral advisor was Peter K. Davies. From 2005 to 2007, Wu conducted a postdoc as research associate in the National Institute of Standards and Technology Center for Neutron Research. Her postdoctoral advisor was Terrence J. Udovic. She researched the development and processing of novel metal hydride materials for hydrogen storage and hydrogen-storage materials using neutron scattering techniques.

== Career ==
From 2007 to 2015, Wu worked as a scientist in the NIST Center for Neutron Research and for the department of materials science and engineering at University of Maryland, College Park. In 2015, she was promoted to senior scientist at NIST.

=== Research ===
Wu's background is in advanced materials development including the development of novel materials for energy-related applications (hydrogen-storage and full cell), synthesis and characterization of new materials for nanoelectronics applications, and the study of materials used for indoor air purification. Wu is also experienced in solid state physics and chemistry including X-ray and neutron scattering, electron microscopy, and thermal analysis.

== Awards and honors ==
In 2004, Wu won the best poster award at the Materials Research Society Solid State Chemistry Symposium. In 2005, she won the University of Pennsylvania S. J. Stein Prize for or superior achievement in the field of new or unique materials or applications for materials in electronics. Wu was honored with the outstanding poster presentation at the 14th annual NIST chapter of Sigma Xi poster competition. In 2010, Wu received the Sidhu Award from the Pittsburgh Diffraction Society for her exceptional contribution to the structural investigation of new materials for energy storage applications. In 2017, she received the Department of Commerce Bronze Medal for producing an entirely new route to synthesizing hydrogen-storage materials for fuel cells based on the complex chemistry of amines and boranes. In 2018, she was recognized by Clarivate Analytics as a highly cited researcher in the field of Cross-Field.
