= Jens Potteck =

East German sport shooter (born 1968)

Jens Potteck (born 5 October 1968 in Wittenberge) is a German former sport shooter who competed in the 1988 Summer Olympics in 10 m air pistol. His brother, Uwe Potteck, is also an Olympic shooter.
