= Heinrich Fretwurst =

German sports shooter

Personal information
- Born: 25 April 1937 Hamburg, Germany
- Died: 21 June 2020 (aged 83) Hamburg

Sport
- Sport: Sports shooting

Heinrich Fretwurst (25 April 1937 – 21 June 2020) was a German sports shooter. He competed in the 50 metre pistol event at the 1972 Summer Olympics for West Germany.
