= Deepender Singh =

Indian para sport shooter (born 1994)

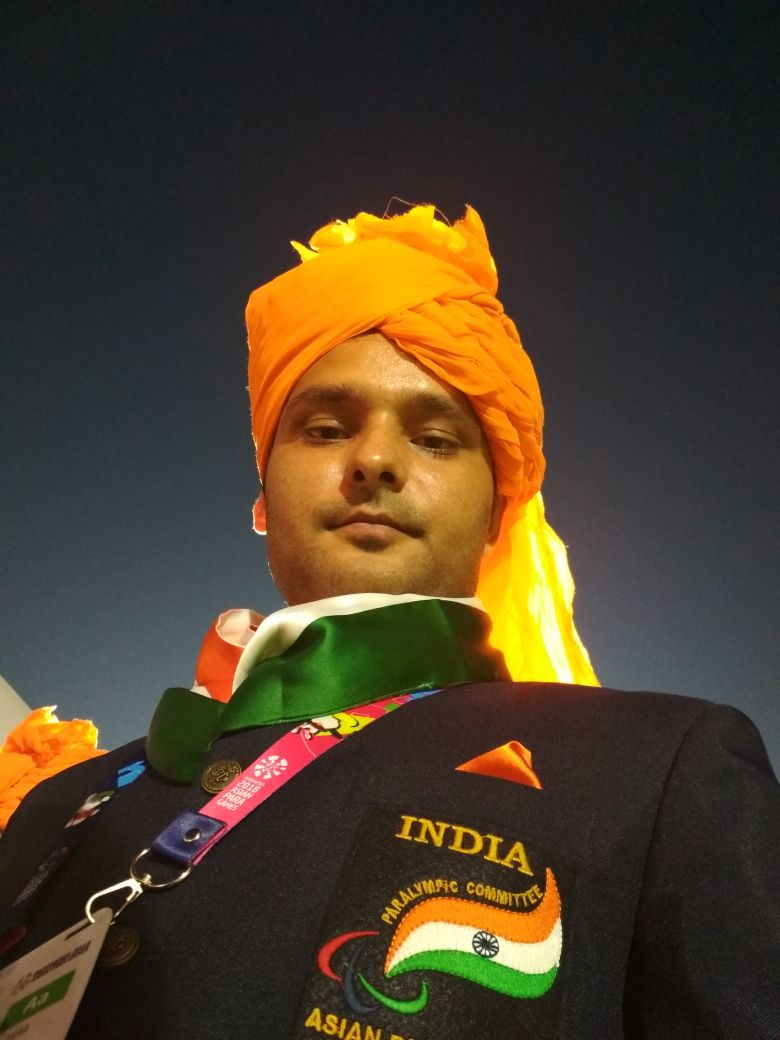
- Deepender Singh

Personal information
- Full name: Deepender Singh
- Nickname: Deepu
- Nationality: Indian
- Born: 15 June 1994 (age 32) Vill:Bhatpura, Sambhal, Uttar Pradesh, India
- Height: 5 ft 8 in (173 cm)
- Weight: 71 Kg
- Spouse: Rajpal Singh (father)
- Life partner: Neetudeep

Sport
- Country: India
- Sport: Pistol Shooting
- Disability: Yes
- Disability class: Orthopedic
- Event: P1, SH1
- Club: Veer Sahamal Rifle Club
- Team: INDIA PARA SHOOTING TEAM
- Coached by: [beginning by Amit Sheoran]
- Now coaching: Since 2014

Achievements and titles
- Paralympic finals: tokyo 10th rank .
- World finals: Asian record, World record.
- Highest world ranking: 1st 2018

Deepender Singh (born 15 June 1994 Bhatpura, Sambhal, India) is a champion Indian para pistol sport shooter. His family are subsistence farmers living between the Yamuna and Gangetic plains of western Uttar Pradesh. He has won many gold and silver medals and set a new para world record at the Para World Cup in Bangkok.

== Olympic Journey ==
From Tin-Shed Academy to Tokyo Olympics held in 2021. Just months before the world was coming out the era of COVID-19. But, the sensational para shooter Deepender Singh fired his way into the qualifications of the men's 10m air pistol event. Coach Amit Sheoran hard work at Aryangateways Sports Foundation for Singh proved itself in Olympics. Unfortunately medal slipped off even after being on top initially in qualification table.

== Notable performances ==
- Silver Medal in men's 10 m. Air Pistol SH1 at the World Shooting Para Sport World Cup 2018 in Chateau roux, France'.
- Gold medal in men's 10 m. Air Pistol at the 'World Shooting Para Sport World Cup 2017, Bangkok, Thailand.
- Represented Indian team in Para Olympic at Tokyo 2021.

== See also ==
- Paralympic Committee of India
- National Rifle Association of India (NRAI)
- International Shooting Sports Federation (ISSF)
- Sports Authoruity of India (SAI)
