= Staffan Oscarsson =

Swedish sports shooter

Personal information
- Nationality: Swedish
- Born: 13 November 1951 (age 73); Strömsund, Sweden

Sport
- Sport: Sports shooting

Staffan Oscarsson (born 13 November 1951) is a Swedish sports shooter. He competed in the mixed 50 metre free pistol event at the 1980 Summer Olympics.
