= Kornél Marosvári =

Hungarian sports shooter

Personal information
- Born: 30 June 1943 Baja, Hungary
- Died: 30 May 2016 (aged 72)

Sport
- Sport: Sports shooting

Kornél Marosvári (30 June 1943 – 30 May 2016) was a Hungarian sports shooter. He competed in the 50 metre pistol event at the 1972 Summer Olympics.
