= Zsolt Karacs =

Hungarian sports shooter

Personal information
- Nationality: Hungarian
- Born: 30 October 1966 (age 58); Püspökladány, Hungary

Sport
- Sport: Sports shooting

Zsolt Karacs (born 30 October 1966) is a Hungarian sports shooter. He competed in two events at the 1996 Summer Olympics.
