= Rolf Beutler =

Swiss sports shooter

Personal information
- Nationality: Swiss
- Born: 4 December 1940 (age 84)

Sport
- Sport: Sports shooting

Rolf Beutler (born 4 December 1940) is a Swiss sports shooter. He competed at the 1984 Summer Olympics and the 1988 Summer Olympics.
