= Margit Stein =

German sports shooter (born 1966)

Personal information
- Nationality: German
- Born: 16 September 1966 (age 59) Daaden, Germany

Sport
- Sport: Sports shooting

Margit Stein (born 16 September 1966) is a German sports shooter. She competed at the 1988 Summer Olympics and the 1992 Summer Olympics.
