= Kerstin Bodin =

Swedish sports shooter

Personal information
- Nationality: Swedish
- Born: 2 August 1950 (age 74); Stockholm, Sweden

Sport
- Sport: Sports shooting

Kerstin Bodin (born 2 August 1950) is a Swedish sports shooter. She competed in the women's 10 metre air pistol event at the 1988 Summer Olympics.
