= Uwe Potteck =

German sports shooter

Personal information
- Born: 1 May 1955 (age 71) Wittenberge, East Germany

Sport
- Sport: Shooting
Medal record
Men's shooting
Representing East Germany
Olympic Games
Gold medal – first place	1976 Montreal	50 metre pistol

Uwe Potteck (born 1 May 1955) is a German sports shooter and Olympic champion. He won gold medal in the 50 metre pistol at the 1976 Summer Olympics in Montréal. At the Olympics in 1980 he placed 16th, and in 1988 he placed ninth. His brother, Jens Potteck, is also an Olympic shooter.
