= ISSF 25 meter rapid fire pistol =

International Shooting Sports Federation shooting event

25Metre Rapid Fire Pistol
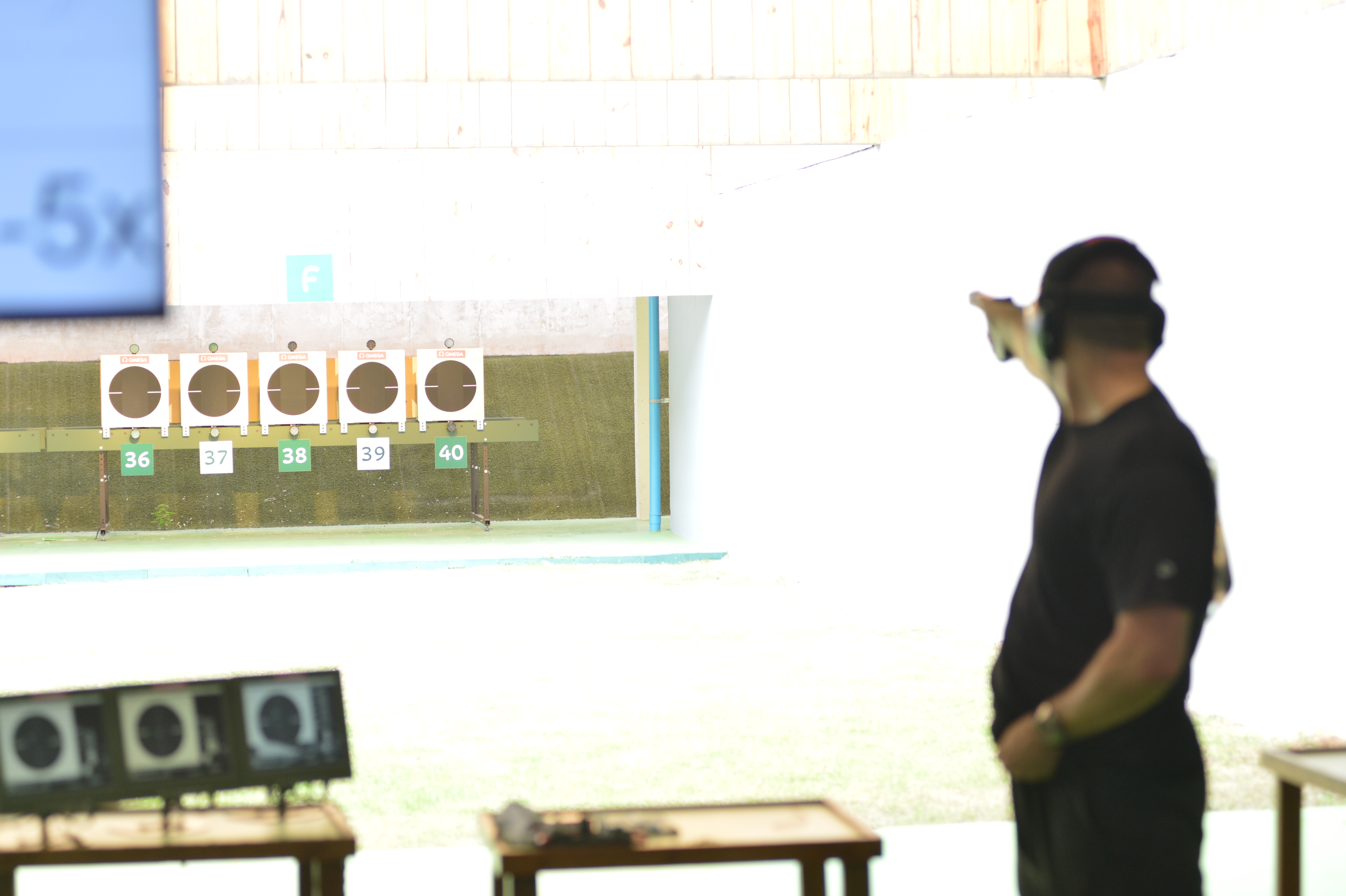

Men
- Number of shots: 2×30 + 40
- Olympic Games: Since 1896
- World Championships: Since 1933
- Abbreviation: RFP

25 meter rapid fire pistol is one of the ISSF shooting events and is shot with .22 LR pistols. The event has been a part of the Olympic program ever since the beginning in 1896, although its rules changed greatly before World War II, after which they were only slightly changed until the two major revisions of 1989 and 2005. The latter restricted the event to sport pistols, thereby banning .22 Short cartridge (last used in 2004 and replaced by .22 Long Rifle in 2005) as well as encircling grips and low trigger-pull weight. This caused a decline in results, as evidenced by a comparison of the world records under the pre-2005 rules (597) and post-2005 rules (593).

Instead of dropping specialized rapid fire pistols, manufacturers designed new pistols, such as the Walther SSP, conforming to the standard pistol requirements, but optimized for the rapid fire event.

== Course of fire ==
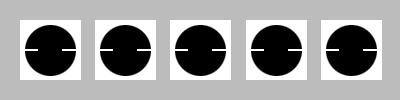
The centers of the targets are 75 cm apart, and the 10 score zone has a diameter of 10 cm.

When paper targets (as opposed to electronic scoring systems) are used, thin scoring rings are printed on the target. The thick aiming lines are present in both versions.

Traditionally, RFP competitions use paper targets that are able to turn 90 degrees to appear to the shooter and then turn back to disappear when the shooting time is up. During the last few decades, these targets have gradually been replaced by electronic devices which use red and green lights to indicate the beginning and the end of the shooting time, and which automatically handle late shots. As these systems are expensive, they are normally only used in international competitions.

A series (or string) consists of five shots fired at one target each within a limited time. The targets stand next to each other at a 25 m distance from the shooter. As with all ISSF pistol disciplines, all firing must be done with one unsupported hand. When the targets appear or when the green light comes on, the competitor must raise his arm from a 45-degree angle starting position and fire his five shots. If a shot is too late, it will score as a miss.

There are three different time limits for the series: 8 seconds, 6 seconds, and 4 seconds. A stage consists of two series of each type, and a full course of fire comprises two such stages, or a total of 60 shots. Since the targets are divided into concentric score zones with 10 being the most central part, the total maximum score is 600.

In major competitions, the top six shooters qualify for a final round of four additional 4-second series, with a shot scoring at or above 9.7 being counted as a hit, or a miss otherwise. To score 9.7 or above, the shot must be within a circle of diameter 124 mm (4.88 inches). The results of the qualification round and the final are added together, and any ties are broken by firing an additional 4-second series.

== World Championships, Men ==
Year	Place	Gold	Silver	Bronze
1933	(Spain) Granada	Andre Charles Des Jamonnieres J. (FRA)	Cristobal Tauler Alos (ESP)	Luis Calvet Sandoz (ESP)
1935	(Italy) Rome	Walter Boninsegni (ITA)	František Pokorný (TCH)	Arturo Gonzalez Costello (ESP)
1937	(Finland) Helsinki	Kārlis Kļava (LAT)	Pranas Giedrimas (LTU)	Erik Ljungqvist (FIN)
1939	(Switzerland) Luzern	Torsten Ullman (SWE)	Cornelius van Oyen (GER)	Jonas Miliauskas (LTU)
1947	(Sweden) Stockholm	Carlos Enrique Díaz Sáenz Valiente (ARG)	Constantin Mylonas (GRE)	Sven Lundquist (SWE)
1949	(Argentina) Buenos Aires	Huelet Benner (USA)	Harry Wendell Reeves (USA)	Leonard Ravilo (FIN)
1952	(Norway) Oslo	Huelet Benner (USA)	Penait Calcai (ROM)	Carlos Enrique Díaz Sáenz Valiente (ARG)
1954	(Venezuela) Caracas	Nikolai Kalinichenko (URS)	William McMillan (USA)	Pentti Linnosvuo (FIN)
1958	(Soviet Union) Moscow	Aleksandr Kropotin (URS)	Alexander Zabelin (URS)	Ștefan Petrescu (ROM)
1962	(Egypt) Cairo	Alexander Zabelin (URS)	Igor Bakalov (URS)	James Henderson McNally (USA)
1966	(West Germany) Wiesbaden	Virgil Atanasiu (ROM)	Józef Zapędzki (POL)	Renart Suleimanov (URS)
1970	(United States) Phoenix	Giovanni Liverzani (ITA)	Ladislav Falta (TCH)	Weselin Petkov (BUL)
1974	(Switzerland) Thun	Alfred Radke (FRG)	Heinz Weissenberger (FRG)	Viktor Torshin (URS)
1978	(South Korea) Seoul	Ove Gunnarsson (SWE)	Werner Beier (FRG)	Gerhard Petritsch (AUT)
1982	(Venezuela) Caracas	Igor Puzirev (URS)	Ove Gunnarsson (SWE)	Alfred Radke (FRG)
1986	(East Germany) Suhl	Adam Kaczmarek (POL)	Andrzej Macur (POL)	Ralf Schumann (GDR)
1990	(Soviet Union) Moscow	Ralf Schumann (GDR)	Miroslav Ignatiuk (URS)	Petri Eteläniemi (FIN)
1994	(Italy) Milan	Krzysztof Kucharczyk (POL)	Emil Milev (BUL)	Ralf Schumann (GER)
1998	(Spain) Barcelona	Ralf Schumann (GER)	Daniel Leonhard (GER)	Iulian Raicea (ROM)
2002	(Finland) Lahti	Marco Spangenberg (GER)	Ralf Schumann (GER)	Niki Marty (SUI)
2006	(Croatia) Zagreb	Zhang Penghui (CHN)	Liu Zhongsheng (CHN)	Sergei Alifirenko (RUS)
2010	(Germany) Munich	Alexei Klimov (RUS)	Zhang Jian (CHN)	Li Yuehong (CHN)
2014	(Spain) Granada	Kim Jun-hong (KOR)	Oliver Geis (GER)	Li Yuehong (CHN)
2018	(South Korea) Changwon	Lin Junmin (CHN)	Zhang Jian (CHN)	Jean Quiquampoix (FRA)
2022	(Egypt) New Administrative Capital	Lee Gun-hyeok (KOR)	Clément Bessaguet (FRA)	Ghulam Mustafa Bashir (PAK)
2023	(Azerbaijan) Baku	Li Yuehong (CHN)	Clément Bessaguet (FRA)	Florian Peter (GER)

== World Championships, Men's Team ==
Year	Place	Gold	Silver	Bronze
1937	(Finland) Helsinki	(Finland) Finland; Vilho Elo; Erik Ljungqvist; Arvo Odenvall; Jaakko Rintanen; Sulo Cederström	(Lithuania) Lithuania; Pranas Giedrimas; Kazys Sruoga; Antanas Jelenskas; Antanas Karčiauskas; Antanas Mamžeika	(Germany) Germany; Fritz Bucherer; Hans Funck; Walter Hartwig; Paul Jasper; Cornelius van Oyen
1939	(Switzerland) Luzern	(Hungary) Hungary; Laszlo Badinszky; Lajos Borzsonyi Dr. Ede Domby; Károly Takács; Laszlo Vadnay	(Lithuania) Lithuania; Pranas Giedrimas; Vladas Nakutis; Antanas Mamžeika; Jonas Miliauskas; Antanas Jelenskas	(Germany) Germany; Fritz Bucherer; Ludwig Leupold; Walter L. Cornelius van Oyen; Zindel M.
1947	(Sweden) Stockholm	(Italy) Italy; Ferdinando Bernini; Bertoni G. Linari F. Mazzavillani B.	(Finland) Finland; Väinö Heusala; Matti Kallio; Mauri Kuokka; Leonard Ravilo	(Greece) Greece; Evangelos Chryssafis; Angelos Papadimas; Constantin Mylonas; Georges Vichos
1949	(Argentina) Buenos Aires	(Argentina) Argentina; Carlos Enrique Díaz Sáenz Valiente; Dionisio Fernández; Oscar Rosendo Cervo; Enrique Furtado	(Finland) Finland; Väinö Heusala; Matti Kallio; Leonard Ravilo; Eino Saarnikko	(United States) United States; Huelet Benner; Hancock W. Logie C. Harry Wendell Reeves
1952	(Norway) Oslo	(United States) United States; Huelet Benner; Walter Devine; William McMillan; Harry Wendell Reeves	(Finland) Finland; Väinö Heusala; Veli-Jussi Hölsö; Leonard Ravilo; Lauri Toikka	(Argentina) Argentina; Cabral G. Oscar Rosendo Cervo; Schack E. Carlos Enrique Díaz Sáenz Valiente
1954	(Venezuela) Caracas	(Soviet Union) Soviet Union; Evgeni Cherkassov; Nikolai Kalinichenko; Victor Nasonov; Oleg Zhgutov	(United States) United States; Huelet Benner; William McMillan; Thomas Mitchell; Philip Clay Roettinger	(Finland) Finland; Väinö Heusala; Pentti Linnosvuo; Leonard Ravilo; Lauri Toikka
1958	(Soviet Union) Moscow	(Soviet Union) Soviet Union; Evgeni Cherkassov; Aleksandr Kropotin; Victor Nasonov; Alexander Zabelin	(United States) United States; Huelet Benner; William McMillan; Miller D. Aubrey Smith	(Hungary) Hungary; Aladár Dobsa; József Gyönyörű; Ferenc Kun; Károly Takács
1962	(Egypt) Cairo	(Soviet Union) Soviet Union; Efim Haydurov; Igor Bakalov; Renart Suleimanov; Alexander Zabelin	United States; James Henderson McNally; William McMillan; Aubrey Smith; Cecil Wallis	(Italy) Italy; Ugo Amicosante; Giovanni Liverzani; Roberto Mazzoni; Sergio Varetto
1966	(West Germany) Wiesbaden	(Soviet Union) Soviet Union; Igor Bakalov; Stanislav Frantsevski; Renart Suleimanov; Alexander Zabelin	(Romania) Romania; Virgil Atanasiu; Mihai Dumitriu; Marcel Roşca; Ion Tripşa	(East Germany) East Germany; Gerhard Feller; Gerhard Dommrich; Christian Duering; Lothar Pinnig
1970	(United States) Phoenix	(Czechoslovakia) Czechoslovakia; Ladislav Falta; Vladimír Hurt; Rudolf Kolinek; Lubomír Nácovský	(Romania) Romania; Virgil Atanasiu; Dan Iuga; Marcel Roșca; Ion Tripșa	(Italy) Italy; Ugo Amicosante; Roberto Ferraris; Giovanni Liverzani; Silvano Mignardi
1974	(Switzerland) Thun	(Soviet Union) Soviet Union; Yuri Alekhin; Afanasijs Kuzmins; Victor Torshin; Mikhail Ziubko	(Czechoslovakia) Czechoslovakia; Vladimír Hurt; Vladimír Hyka; Jan Kotora; Lubomír Nácovský	(Romania) Romania; Virgil Atanasiu; Corneliu Ion; Marin Stan; Marcel Roșca
1978	(South Korea) Seoul	(West Germany) West Germany; Werner Beier; Alfred Radke; Helmut Seeger; Heinz Weissenberger	(Italy) Italy; Rolando Comazzetto; Roberto Ferraris; Gianfranco Mantelli; Alberto Sevieri	(Sweden) Sweden; Curt Andersson; Ove Gunnarsson; Boo Levin; Ragnar Skanåker
1982	(Venezuela) Caracas	(Soviet Union) Soviet Union; Afanasijs Kuzmins; Igor Puzirev; Sergei Rysev; Vladimir Vokhmianin	(Romania) Romania; Grațian Calotă; Corneliu Ion; Virgil Suciu; Marin Stan	(Hungary) Hungary; László Orbán; Laszlo Nemeth; Gábor Plank; Istvan Szalai
1986	(East Germany) Suhl	(Soviet Union) Soviet Union; Afanasijs Kuzmins; Oleg Tkachyov; Vladimir Vokhmianin	(Hungary) Hungary; Csaba Hell; Zoltan Kovacs; László Orbán	(East Germany) East Germany; Roger Herzig; Peter Schumann; Juergen Wiefel
1990	(Soviet Union) Moscow	(Soviet Union) Soviet Union; Miroslav Ignatiuk; Afanasijs Kuzmins; Victor Torshin	(Hungary) Hungary; László Balogh; Zoltan Kovacs; Lajos Pálinkás	(Switzerland) Switzerland; Otto Keller; Anton Kuechler; Hansrudolf Schneider
1994	(Italy) Milan	(Poland) Poland; Adam Kaczmarek; Andrzej Macur; Krzysztof Kucharczyk	(China); Meng Gang; Wang Runxi; Zhang Ruimin	(Hungary) Hungary; István Jambrik; Sándor Kacskó; Lajos Pálinkás
1998	(Spain) Barcelona	(Germany); Ralf Schumann; Daniel Leonhard; Lars Uehlin	(China); Ji Haiping; Zhang Penghui; Meng Gang	(Japan); Shoichi Uenosono; Tomohiro Kida; Shuji Tazawa
2002	(Finland) Lahti	(Germany); Ralf Schumann; Marco Spangenberg; Klaus-Dieter Schmidt	(China); Ji Haiping; Liu Guohui; Zhang Penghui	(Ukraine) Ukraine; Oleg Tkachyov; Roman Bondaruk; Taras Magmet
2006	(Croatia) Zagreb	(China); Zhang Penghui; Liu Zhongsheng; Liu Guohui	(Russia) Russia; Sergei Alifirenko; Sergei Poliakov; Alexei Klimov	(Italy) Italy; Marco Liberato; Riccardo Mazzetti; Nicola Nello Pizzi
2010	(Germany) Munich	(China); Zhang Jian; Li Yuehong; Ding Feng	(Russia) Russia; Alexei Klimov; Leonid Ekimov; Dmitry Brayko	United States; Brad Balsley; Keith Sanderson; Emil Milev
2014	(Spain) Granada	(Germany); Oliver Geis; Christian Reitz; Aaron Sauter	(Czech Republic) Czech Republic; Tomas Tehan; Martin Podhráský; Martin Strnad	(Russia) Russia; Leonid Ekimov; Alexei Klimov; Alexander Alifirenko
2018	(South Korea) Changwon	(China); Lin Junmin; Zhang Jian; Yao Zhaonan	(Germany); Oliver Geis; Christian Reitz; Christian Freckmann	(South Korea) South Korea; Kim Jun-hong; Song Jong-ho; Park Jun-woo
2022	(Egypt) New Administrative Capital	China; Li Yuehong; Lu Zhiming; Zhang Jueming	Ukraine; Maksym Horodynets; Pavlo Korostylov; Denys Kushnirov	Korea; Kim Seo-jun; Lee Jae-kyoon; Lee Gun-hyeok
2023	(Azerbaijan) Baku	China (CHN); Wang Xinjie; Li Yuehong; Liu Yangpan	Germany (GER); Florian Peter; Oliver Geis; Christian Reitz	South Korea (KOR); Song Jong-ho; Lee Gun-hyeok; Kim Seo-jun

== World Championships, Women ==
Year	Place	Gold	Silver	Bronze
1962	(Egypt) Cairo	Sofia Tiagni (URS)	Nadezhda Yulina (URS)	Gertrude Schernitzauer (USA)

== World Championships, Mixed ==
Year	Place	Gold	Silver	Bronze
2022	(Egypt) New Administrative Capital	Ukraine; Yulia Korostylova; Maksym Horodynets	India; Simranpreet Kaur Brar; Anish Bhanwala	Korea; Kim Jang-mi; Kim Seo-jun

== World Championships, total medals ==
Rank	Nation	Gold	Silver	Bronze	Total
1	Soviet Union	13	4	3	20
2	China	6	5	2	13
3	Germany	5	5	3	13
4	United States	3	5	4	12
5	Poland	3	2	0	5
6	Italy	3	1	3	7
7	West Germany	2	2	1	5
8	Sweden	2	1	2	5
9	Argentina	2	0	2	4
10	Romania	1	4	3	8
11	Finland	1	3	5	9
12	Czechoslovakia	1	3	0	4
13	Hungary	1	2	3	6
14	Russia	1	2	1	4
15	East Germany	1	0	3	4
16	France	1	0	1	2
16	South Korea	1	0	1	2
18	Latvia	1	0	0	1
19	Lithuania	0	3	1	4
20	Spain	0	1	2	3
21	Bulgaria	0	1	1	2
21	Greece	0	1	1	2
23	Czech Republic	0	1	0	1
24	Switzerland	0	0	2	2
25	Austria	0	0	1	1
25	Japan	0	0	1	1
25	Ukraine	0	0	1	1
Totals (27 entries)		48	46	47	141

== Current world records ==
Current world records in 25 metre rapid fire pistol
Men	Qualification	593	Christian Reitz (GER); Kim Jun-hong (KOR)	July 30, 2013; July 6, 2014	Osijek (CRO); Beijing (CHN)
Men	Final	39	Li Yuehong (CHN)	Aug 22, 2023	Baku (AZE)
Men	Teams	1756	China (Zhang, Lin, Yao)	September 10, 2018	Changwon (KOR)
Junior Men	Individual	589	Jean Quiquampoix (FRA); Zhu Haojie (CHN); Peter Florian (GER)	July 26, 2015; September 10, 2018; September 15, 2019	Maribor (SLO); Changwon (KOR); Bologna (ITA)
Junior Men	Final	35	Zhu Haojie (CHN)	September 10, 2018	Changwon (KOR)
Junior Men	Teams	1747	China (Zhu, Cheng, Pan)	September 10, 2018	Changwon (KOR)

== Olympic and World Champions ==
The dominant shooter of the event has been Ralf Schumann of Germany with a total of five major World-level Championship titles, with three Olympic gold medals and two Individual World titles. He is the first and one of the only two shooters to have won a particular Olympic event three times, and is the first of three shooters to have won three individual Olympic titles. Károly Takács and Józef Zapędzki also won two consecutive Olympic titles. Huelet Benner won two consecutive World Championships.

A rare double is that between this rapid fire event and its direct opposite 50 metre pistol; this has only been accomplished by Alfred Lane (completed in 1912), Torsten Ullman (1939), Huelet Benner (1952) and Pentti Linnosvuo (1964), with Lane (both events at the 1912 Olympics) and Linnosvuo using only Olympic titles. Benner, on the other hand, is the only shooter with two titles in both events.

Year	Venue	Individual	Team		
1896 (Note: Only muzzle-loading pistols of .45 caliber. The 25 metre military pistol event, which was won using a Colt revolver, was a separate event.)	Athens	Ioannis Frangoudis (GRE)		Alfred Lane at the 1912 Olympics	
1900 (Note: 20 metre military pistol event)	Paris	Maurice Larrouy (FRA)		Alfred Lane at the 1912 Olympics	
1912 (Note: 30 metre dueling pistol event)	Stockholm	Alfred Lane (USA)	Sweden	Alfred Lane at the 1912 Olympics	
1920 (Note: 30 metre military pistol event)	Antwerp	Guilherme Paraense (BRA)	United States	Alfred Lane at the 1912 Olympics	
1924	Paris	Henry Bailey (USA)		Alfred Lane at the 1912 Olympics	
1932	Los Angeles	Renzo Morigi (ITA)		Alfred Lane at the 1912 Olympics	
1933	Granada	Charles des Jammonières (FRA)		Alfred Lane at the 1912 Olympics	
1935	Rome	Walter Boninsegni (ITA)		Alfred Lane at the 1912 Olympics	
1936	Berlin	Cornelius van Oyen (GER)		Alfred Lane at the 1912 Olympics	
1937	Helsinki	Kārlis Kļava (LAT)	Finland	Alfred Lane at the 1912 Olympics	
1939	Luzern	Torsten Ullman (SWE)	Hungary	Alfred Lane at the 1912 Olympics	
1947	Stockholm	Carlos Enrique Díaz Sáenz Valiente (ARG)	Italy	Alfred Lane at the 1912 Olympics	
1948	London	Károly Takács (HUN)		Alfred Lane at the 1912 Olympics	
1949	Buenos Aires	Huelet Benner (USA)	Argentina	Alfred Lane at the 1912 Olympics	
1952	Oslo	Huelet Benner (USA)	United States	Alfred Lane at the 1912 Olympics	
1952	Helsinki	Károly Takács (HUN)		Alfred Lane at the 1912 Olympics	
1954	Caracas	Nikolai Kalinichenko (URS)	Soviet Union		
1956	Melbourne	Ştefan Petrescu (ROU)			
1958	Moscow	Alexander Kropotin (URS)	Soviet Union	Károly Takács, the first double Olympic Champion, competing in 1961	
1960	Rome	William McMillan (USA)		Károly Takács, the first double Olympic Champion, competing in 1961	
1962	Cairo	Alexander Zabelin (URS)	Soviet Union	Károly Takács, the first double Olympic Champion, competing in 1961	
1964	Tokyo	Pentti Linnosvuo (FIN)		Károly Takács, the first double Olympic Champion, competing in 1961	
1966	Wiesbaden	Virgil Atanasiu (ROU)	Soviet Union	Károly Takács, the first double Olympic Champion, competing in 1961	
1968	Mexico City	Józef Zapędzki (POL)		Károly Takács, the first double Olympic Champion, competing in 1961	
1970	Phoenix	Giovanni Liverzani (ITA)	Czechoslovakia	Károly Takács, the first double Olympic Champion, competing in 1961	
1972	Munich	Józef Zapędzki (POL)		Károly Takács, the first double Olympic Champion, competing in 1961	
1974	Thun	Alfred Radke (FRG)	Soviet Union	Károly Takács, the first double Olympic Champion, competing in 1961	
1976	Montreal	Norbert Klaar (GDR)		Károly Takács, the first double Olympic Champion, competing in 1961	
1978	Seoul	Ove Gunnarsson (SWE)	West Germany	Károly Takács, the first double Olympic Champion, competing in 1961	
1980	Moscow	Corneliu Ion (ROU)		Károly Takács, the first double Olympic Champion, competing in 1961	
1982	Caracas	Igor Puzirev (URS)	Soviet Union	Károly Takács, the first double Olympic Champion, competing in 1961	
1984	Los Angeles	Takeo Kamachi (JPN)			
1986	Suhl	Adam Kaczmarek (POL)	Soviet Union		
1988	Seoul	Afanasijs Kuzmins (URS)			
1990	Moscow	Ralf Schumann (GDR)	Soviet Union	Juniors	
1992	Barcelona	Ralf Schumann (GER)		Individual	Team
1994	Milan	Krzysztof Kucharczyk (POL)	Poland	Joseph Gonzalez (USA)	Germany
1996	Atlanta	Ralf Schumann (GER)			
1998	Barcelona	Ralf Schumann (GER)	Germany	Jorge Llames (ESP)	Germany
2000	Sydney	Sergei Alifirenko (RUS)			
2002	Lahti	Marco Spangenberg (GER)	Germany	Martin Behrendt (GER)	Germany
2004	Athens	Ralf Schumann (GER)			
2006	Zagreb	Zhang Penghui (CHN)	China	Christian Reitz (GER)	Russia
2008	Beijing	Oleksandr Petriv (UKR)			
2010	Munich	Alexei Klimov (RUS)	China	Zhou Zhiguo (CHN)	China
2012	London	Leuris Pupo (CUB)			
2014	Granada	Kim Jun Hong (KOR)	Germany	Jean Quiquampoix (FRA)	China
2016	Rio de Janeiro	Christian Reitz (GER)			
2018	Changwon	Lin Junmin (CHN)	China		
2021	Tokyo	Jean Quiquampoix (FRA)			
2022	New Administrative Capital	Lee Gun-hyeok (KOR)	China		
2023	Baku	Li Yuehong (CHN)	China		
2024	Paris	Li Yuehong (CHN)			
