= Shooting at the 1976 Summer Olympics – Mixed 25 metre rapid fire pistol =

Sports shooting at the Olympics

Mixed 25 metre rapid fire pistol at the Games of the XXI Olympiad
- Shooting pictogram
- Venue: Olympic Shooting Range, L'Acadie
- Dates: 22–23 July 1976
- Competitors: 48 from 30 nations
- Winning score: 597 OR

Medalists
1st place, gold medalist(s)		Norbert Klaar; East Germany
2nd place, silver medalist(s)		Jürgen Wiefel; East Germany
3rd place, bronze medalist(s)		Roberto Ferraris; Italy

The mixed ISSF 25 meter rapid fire pistol was a shooting sports event held as part of the Shooting at the 1976 Summer Olympics programme. It was the 15th appearance of the event. The competition was held on 22 and 23 July 1976 at the Olympic Shooting Range, L'Acadie in Montreal. 48 shooters from 30 nations competed. Nations had been limited to two shooters each since the 1952 Games. East Germany did the most possible with that two-shooter limit, taking gold (Norbert Klaar) and silver (Jürgen Wiefel). They were the first rapid fire pistol medals for East Germany and the first medals for any German shooter in the event since 1936. Roberto Ferraris of Italy earned the bronze medal, the nation's first medal in the rapid fire pistol since 1932.

== Background ==
This was the 15th appearance of what had been standardised in 1948 as the men's ISSF 25 meter rapid fire pistol event, the only event on the 2020 programme that traces back to 1896. The event has been held at every Summer Olympics except 1904 and 1928 (when no shooting events were held) and 1908; it was nominally open to women from 1968 to 1980, although very few women participated these years. There is no women's equivalent on the Olympic programme, as of 2021. The first five events were quite different, with some level of consistency finally beginning with the 1932 event—which, though it had differences from the 1924 competition, was roughly similar. The 1936 competition followed the 1932 one quite closely. The post-World War II event substantially altered the competition once again.

Six of the top 10 shooters from 1972 returned: two-time gold medalist Józef Zapędzki of Poland, bronze medalist Viktor Torshin of the Soviet Union, fourth-place finisher Paul Buser of Switzerland, fifth-place finisher Jaime González of Spain, eighth-place finisher Gerhard Petritsch of Austria, and ninth-place finisher Vladimír Hurt of Czechoslovakia. 1960 gold medalist William McMillan of the United States competed once again. West Germany had the top two shooters at the 1974 world championships, but the nation sent two different competitors to Montreal; Torshin had finished third at worlds.

North Korea made its debut in the event (after having an entered shooter not start in 1972). The United States made its 13th appearance in the event, most of any nation.

== Competition format ==
The competition format followed the 1948 format, now very close to the modern rapid fire pistol competition after significant variation before World War II. Each shooter fired 60 shots. These were done in two courses of 30; each course consisted of two stages of 15; each stage consisted of three series of 5. In each stage, the time limit for each series was 8 seconds for the first, 6 seconds for the second, and 4 seconds for the third. Ties for medals were broken via shoot-off.

A holdover from the previous Games was that full-body silhouettes, rather than round targets, continued to be used; however, scoring rings had been added so that now each shot was scored up to 10 rather than being strictly hit or miss.

One change from 1948–1956 was that hits were no longer the primary measurement of success. As in 1960–1972, ranking was done by score, regardless of hits.

== Records ==
Prior to the competition, the existing world and Olympic records were as follows.

World record		598		
Olympic record	Józef Zapędzki (POL)	595	Munich, West Germany	August 31 & September 1, 1972

Norbert Klaar beat the Olympic record with 597 points, as did Jurgen Wiefel at 596 points. The next three men tied the old record.

== Schedule ==
Date	Time	Round
Thursday, 22 July 1976	9:30	Course 1
Friday, 23 July 1976	9:30	Course 2

== Results ==
Two-time defending gold medalist Zapędzki's pistol malfunctioned after his first shot in one series on the first day, costing him 4 shots, 40 points, and a chance at a third medal.

Rank	Shooter	Nation	Score	Notes
1st place, gold medalist(s)	Norbert Klaar	East Germany	597	OR
2nd place, silver medalist(s)	Jürgen Wiefel	East Germany	596	
3rd place, bronze medalist(s)	Roberto Ferraris	Italy	595	
4	Afanasijs Kuzmins	Soviet Union	595	
5	Corneliu Ion	Romania	595	
6	Erwin Glock	West Germany	594	
7	Gerhard Petritsch	Austria	594	
8	Marin Stan	Romania	594	
9	Werner Beier	West Germany	593	
10	Paul Buser	Switzerland	592	
11	Viktor Torshin	Soviet Union	592	
12	Takeo Kamachi	Japan	591	
12	Vladimír Hurt	Czechoslovakia	591	
14	Gianfranco Mantelli	Italy	589	
15	Kell Runland	Denmark	587	
15	Brian Girling	Great Britain	587	
15	Park Jong-gil	South Korea	587	
15	So Gil-san	North Korea	587	
15	Franc Peternel	Yugoslavia	587	
20	Jaime González	Spain	586	
20	Juan Seguí	Spain	586	
20	Kanji Kubo	Japan	586	
20	Curt Andersson	Sweden	586	
20	Ove Gunnarsson	Sweden	586	
20	Vladimír Hyka	Czechoslovakia	586	
20	Bill McMillan	United States	586	
27	Osvaldo Scandola	Argentina	585	
27	Jean Baumann	France	585	
27	Maciej Orlik	Poland	585	
30	Yun Chang-ho	North Korea	584	
31	Jules Sobrian	Canada	583	
31	John Cooke	Great Britain	583	
33	Alfredo González	Colombia	581	
34	Alexander Taransky	Australia	580	
35	Solos Nalampoon	Thailand	578	
36	Bruno Morri	San Marino	576	
36	Tom Treinen	United States	576	
38	Steven Kelly	Canada	570	
39	Jaime Vives	Puerto Rico	568	
40	Oscar Yuston	Argentina	565	
41	Delival Nobre	Brazil	563	
41	Somboon Pattra	Thailand	563	
43	Juan Marchand	Puerto Rico	558	
44	Tom Ong	Philippines	557	
45	Józef Zapędzki	Poland	556	
46	Roberto Tamagnini	San Marino	547	
47	Solomon Lee	Hong Kong	545	
48	Michel Braun	Luxembourg	445	
