= Shooting at the 1980 Summer Olympics – Mixed 25 metre rapid fire pistol =

Sports shooting at the Olympics

25 metre rapid fire pistol at the Games of the XXII Olympiad
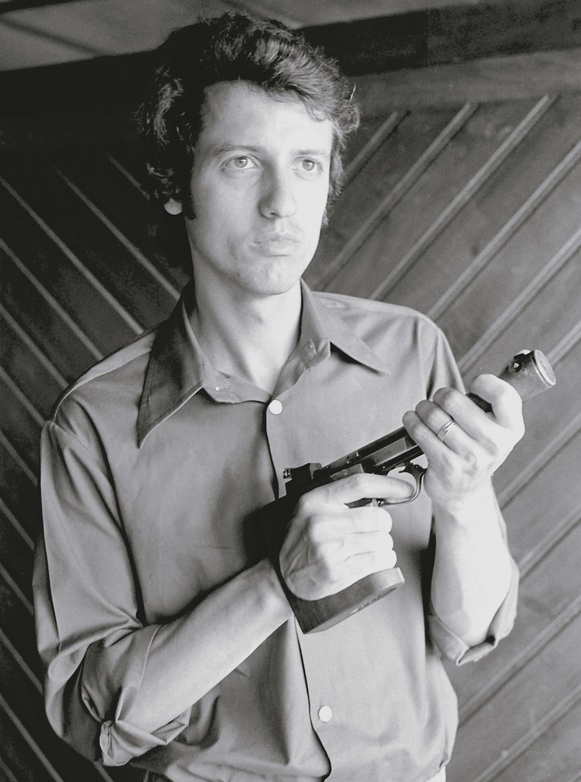
- Corneliu Ion
- Venue: Dynamo Shooting Range
- Date: 25 July 1980
- Competitors: 40 from 25 nations
- Winning score: 596

Medalists
1st place, gold medalist(s)		Corneliu Ion; Romania
2nd place, silver medalist(s)		Jürgen Wiefel; East Germany
3rd place, bronze medalist(s)		Gerhard Petritsch; Austria

The mixed ISSF 25 meter rapid fire pistol shooting competition at the 1980 Summer Olympics was held on 25 July at the Dynamo Shooting Range in Moscow, USSR. There were 40 competitors from 25 nations. Nations had been limited to two shooters each since the 1952 Games. The event was won by Corneliu Ion of Romania, the nation's first victory in the event since 1956 and second overall (tying Poland and Hungary for second-most all-time, behind the United States with 3). East German Jürgen Wiefel repeated as silver medalist, becoming the sixth man to win multiple medals in the event. Austria earned its first rapid fire pistol medal with Gerhard Petritsch's bronze.

== Background ==
This was the 16th appearance of what had been standardised in 1948 as the men's ISSF 25 meter rapid fire pistol event, the only event on the 2020 programme that traces back to 1896. The event has been held at every Summer Olympics except 1904 and 1928 (when no shooting events were held) and 1908; it was nominally open to women from 1968 to 1980, although very few women participated these years. The first five events were quite different, with some level of consistency finally beginning with the 1932 event—which, though it had differences from the 1924 competition, was roughly similar. The 1936 competition followed the 1932 one quite closely. The post-World War II event substantially altered the competition once again.

Six of the top 10 shooters from 1976 returned: silver medalist Jürgen Wiefel of East Germany, bronze medalist Roberto Ferraris of Italy, fourth-place finisher Afanasijs Kuzmins of the Soviet Union, fifth-place finisher Corneliu Ion of Romania, seventh-place finisher Gerhard Petritsch of Austria, and eighth-place finisher Marin Stan of Romania. Ove Gunnarsson of Sweden was the reigning world champion (1978); the runner-up (West German Werner Beier) was absent due to the American-led boycott. Petritsch had finished third at worlds.

Costa Rica, Ireland, Laos, and Zimbabwe each made their debut in the event. Italy made its 12th appearance, most of any competing nation and second-most of all nations behind the boycotting United States at 13.

== Competition format ==
The competition format followed the 1948 format, now very close to the modern rapid fire pistol competition after significant variation before World War II. Each shooter fired 60 shots. These were done in two courses of 30; each course consisted of two stages of 15; each stage consisted of three series of 5. In each stage, the time limit for each series was 8 seconds for the first, 6 seconds for the second, and 4 seconds for the third. Ties for medals were broken via shoot-off, with each shoot-off round consisting of 3 series of 5 shots.

A holdover from the previous Games was that silhouettes, rather than round targets, continued to be used; however, scoring rings had been added so that now each shot was scored up to 10 rather than being strictly hit or miss.

One change from 1948–1956 was that hits were no longer the primary measurement of success. As in 1960–1976, ranking was done by score, regardless of hits.

== Records ==
Prior to the competition, the existing world and Olympic records were as follows.

World record				
Olympic record	Norbert Klaar (GDR)	597	Montreal, Canada	22–23 July 1976

No new world or Olympic records were set during the competition.

== Schedule ==
Date	Time	Round
Thursday, 24 July 1980		Course 1
Friday, 25 July 1980		Course 2

== Results ==
Rank	Shooter	Nation	Course 1	Course 2	Total	Notes
1	Corneliu Ion	Romania	299	297	596	Q
1	Jürgen Wiefel	East Germany	299	297	596	Q
1	Gerhard Petritsch	Austria	297	299	596	Q
4	Vladas Turla	Soviet Union	296	299	595	
5	Roberto Ferraris	Italy	296	299	595	
6	Afanasijs Kuzmins	Soviet Union	297	298	595	
7	Marin Stan	Romania	298	297	595	
8	Rafael Rodríguez	Cuba	297	297	594	
9	So Gil-San	North Korea	298	296	594	
10	László Orbán	Hungary	294	299	593	
11	Andreas Franke	East Germany	297	296	593	
12	Ivan Mandov	Bulgaria	297	295	592	
12	Gianfranco Mantelli	Italy	295	297	592	
14	Andrzej Macur	Poland	296	295	591	
14	Józef Zapędzki	Poland	295	296	591	
16	Ove Gunnarsson	Sweden	297	293	590	
16	Todor Stoimenov	Bulgaria	294	296	590	
18	Wibout Jolles	Netherlands	292	297	589	
19	Fernando Gomes	Brazil	293	295	588	
19	Hermann Sailer	Austria	293	295	588	
19	Yun Chang-Ho	North Korea	292	296	588	
22	Jaime González	Spain	293	293	586	
23	Nguyễn Quốc Cường	Vietnam	292	293	585	
23	Franc Petemel	Yugoslavia	290	295	585	
25	Pedro García Jr.	Peru	292	292	584	
26	Vladimír Hurt	Czechoslovakia	285	298	583	
26	Nguyễn Đức Uýnh	Vietnam	292	291	583	
26	Juan Seguí	Spain	294	289	583	
29	Olavi Heikkinen	Finland	295	287	582	
30	Gábor Plank	Hungary	295	285	580	
31	Marco Hidalgo	Costa Rica	289	290	579	
31	Ragnar Skanåker	Sweden	292	287	579	
33	Christian Raynaud	Belgium	290	286	576	
33	Ian Redmond	Zimbabwe	287	289	576	
33	Ken Stanford	Ireland	288	288	576	
36	Roberto Tamagnini	San Marino	287	285	572	
37	Bruno Morri	San Marino	280	290	570	
38	David Westerhout	Zimbabwe	271	258	529	
39	Khamsing	Laos	258	241	499	
40	Khamphanh	Laos	243	210	453	

Shoot-off

Rank	Shooter	Nation	Round 1	Round 2	Round 3
1st place, gold medalist(s)	Corneliu Ion	Romania	148	147	148
2nd place, silver medalist(s)	Jürgen Wiefel	East Germany	148	147	147
3rd place, bronze medalist(s)	Gerhard Petritsch	Austria	146	—	—
