= Shooting at the 1988 Summer Olympics – Men's 25 metre rapid fire pistol =

Sports shooting at the Olympics

Men's 25 metre rapid fire pistol at the Games of the XXIV Olympiad
- Shooting pictogram
- Venue: Taereung International Shooting Range
- Date: 23 September 1988
- Competitors: 32 from 23 nations
- Winning score: 698 OR

Medalists
1st place, gold medalist(s)		Afanasijs Kuzmins; Soviet Union
2nd place, silver medalist(s)		Ralf Schumann; East Germany
3rd place, bronze medalist(s)		Zoltán Kovács; Hungary

The men's ISSF 25 meter rapid fire pistol was one of the thirteen shooting events at the 1988 Summer Olympics. The last Olympic competition on the non-circular target, and the first to feature final shooting, it was won by Latvian Afanasijs Kuzmins after a perfect 300 in the first stage, 298 in the second, and two perfect 50 series in the final, thus not allowing Ralf Schumann and John McNally to eliminate his one-point pre-final lead. It was the first gold medal for the Soviet Union in the event. Schumann comfortably won the silver while McNally fell back during the final with a 47 and a 46, finishing seventh and giving way to a third-place tie between Zoltán Kovács and Alberto Sevieri, resolved in Kovács's favour on grounds of higher final score. The bronze was Hungary's first rapid fire pistol since 1952. There were 32 competitors from 23 nations. Each nation had been limited to two shooters since the 1952 Games.

== Background ==
This was the 18th appearance of what had been standardised in 1948 as the men's ISSF 25 meter rapid fire pistol event, the only event on the 2020 programme that traces back to 1896. The event has been held at every Summer Olympics except 1904 and 1928 (when no shooting events were held) and 1908; it was nominally open to women from 1968 to 1980, although very few women participated these years. The first five events were quite different, with some level of consistency finally beginning with the 1932 event—which, though it had differences from the 1924 competition, was roughly similar. The 1936 competition followed the 1932 one quite closely. The post-World War II event substantially altered the competition once again. The 1984 Games introduced women's-only shooting events, including the ISSF 25 meter pistol (though this was more similar to the non-Olympic men's ISSF 25 meter center-fire pistol than the rapid fire pistol).

Five of the top 10 shooters from 1984 returned: silver medalist (and 1980 gold medalist) Corneliu Ion of Romania, fourth-place finisher Delival Nobre of Brazil, fifth-place finisher Yang Chung-yeol of South Korea, eighth-place finisher Bernardo Tovar of Colombia, and tenth-place finisher Juan Seguí of Spain. Afanasijs Kuzmins of the Soviet Union, who had placed 6th in 1980 and not competed in 1984 due to the Soviet-led boycott, also returned. Poland had taken the top two spots at the 1986 world championships; winner Adam Kaczmarek competed in Seoul but runner-up Andrzej Macur did not. The third-place finisher at the world championships, Ralf Schumann of East Germany, was also the world record holder.

For the first time, no nations made their debut in the event. The United States made its 15th appearance, most of any nation.

== Competition format ==
The competition format introduced a two-round tournament for the first time, using a qualifying round and a final.

The qualifying round was essentially the same as the full competition format from 1948–1984. Each shooter fired 60 shots. These were done in two courses of 30; each course consisted of two stages of 15; each stage consisted of three series of 5. In each stage, the time limit for each series was 8 seconds for the first, 6 seconds for the second, and 4 seconds for the third.

The new final consisted of two series of 5 shots each, scored normally. The top eight shooters advanced to the final. Ties to get into the final were broken first by the total of the two 4-second series in the second course, then the two 6-second series in the second course, then the two 8-second series in the second course, then the 4-, 6-, and 8-second series in order in the first course. Ties in the final were broken first by the total of the two series in the final.

A holdover from the previous Games was that silhouettes, rather than round targets, continued to be used; however, scoring rings had been added so that now each shot was scored up to 10 rather than being strictly hit or miss.

One change from 1948–1956 was that hits were no longer the primary measurement of success. As in 1960–1984, ranking was done by score, regardless of hits.

== Records ==
Prior to the competition, the existing world and Olympic records were as follows.

Qualifying (60 shots)
World record	Ralf Schumann (GDR)			
Olympic record	Norbert Klaar (GDR)	597	Montreal, Canada	22–23 July 1976

Qualifying plus final (70 shots)
World record	New format	n/a	n/a	n/a
Olympic record	New format	n/a	n/a	n/a

Afanasijs Kuzmins set a new Olympic record for the 60-shot qualifying round at 598; Ralf Schumann and John McNally were 1 point behind him in tying the old record at 597.

Kuzmins also set the initial record for the new 70-shot total qualifying plus final at 698.

== Schedule ==
All times are Korea Standard Time adjusted for daylight savings (UTC+10)

Date	Time	Round
Friday, 23 September 1988	13:30	Qualifying; Final

== Results ==
=== Qualifying ===
Rank	Shooter	Nation	Course 1	Course 2	Total	Notes
1	Afanasijs Kuzmins	Soviet Union	300	298	598	Q, OR
2	John McNally	United States	298	299	597	Q
3	Ralf Schumann	East Germany	298	299	597	Q
4	Alberto Sevieri	Italy	296	300	596	Q
5	Adam Kaczmarek	Poland	297	298	595	Q
6	Zoltán Kovács	Hungary	296	298	594	Q
7	Bernardo Tovar	Colombia	296	297	593	Q
8	Dirk Köhler	West Germany	294	297	591	Q 4-second series, course 2: 98; 6-second series, course 2: 100)
9	László Balogh	Hungary	295	296	591	Q 4-second series, course 2: 98; 6-second series, course 2: 98)
9	Yang Chung-yul	South Korea	295	296	591	Q 4-second series, course 2: 98; 6-second series, course 2: 98
11	Krzysztof Kucharczyk	Poland	296	295	591	Q 4-second series, course 2: 95
11	Meng Gang	China	297	294	591	Q 4-second series, course 2: 95
13	Rojelio Arredondo	United States	296	294	590	
13	Nguyễn Quốc Cường	Vietnam	297	293	590	
13	Hans-Rudolf Schneider	Switzerland	297	293	590	
16	Toni Küchler	Switzerland	294	294	589	
16	Li Zhongqi	China	295	294	589	
18	Corneliu Ion	Romania	294	294	588	
18	Roland Müller	East Germany	294	294	588	
18	Juan Segui	Spain	294	294	588	
21	Hideo Nonaka	Japan	291	296	587	
21	Lkhagvaagiin Undralbat	Mongolia	296	291	587	
21	Vladimir Vokhmianin	Soviet Union	293	294	587	
24	Adrian Breton	Great Britain	292	294	586	
24	Delival Nobre	Brazil	295	291	586	
26	Alfredo Gonzalez	Colombia	289	296	585	
26	Christian Kezel	France	289	296	585	
26	Břetislav Putna	Czechoslovakia	291	294	585	
29	Mark Howkins	Canada	293	291	584	
29	Hermann Sailer	Austria	292	292	584	
31	Jouni Vainio	Finland	280	298	578	
32	Lim Jang-soo	South Korea	288	287	575	

=== Final ===
Kovács' final score of 99 broke the tie for bronze medal in his favor over Sevieri's 97.

Rank	Shooter	Nation	Qualifying	Final			Total	Notes
Rank	Shooter	Nation	Qualifying	Series 1	Series 2	Total	Total	Notes
1st place, gold medalist(s)	Afanasijs Kuzmins	Soviet Union	598	50	50	100	698	OR
2nd place, silver medalist(s)	Ralf Schumann	East Germany	597	49	50	99	696	
3rd place, bronze medalist(s)	Zoltán Kovács	Hungary	594	50	49	99	693	
4	Alberto Sevieri	Italy	596	49	48	97	693	
5	Adam Kaczmarek	Poland	595	48	48	96	691	
6	Bernardo Tovar	Colombia	593	49	48	97	690	
7	John McNally	United States	597	47	46	93	690	
8	Dirk Köhler	West Germany	591	49	49	98	689	

== Sources ==
- XXIVth Olympiad Seoul 1988 Official Report – Volume 2 Part 2 (PDF).
