= Shooting at the 1992 Summer Olympics – Men's 25 metre rapid fire pistol =

Sports shooting at the Olympics

Men's 25 metre rapid fire pistol at the Games of the XXV Olympiad
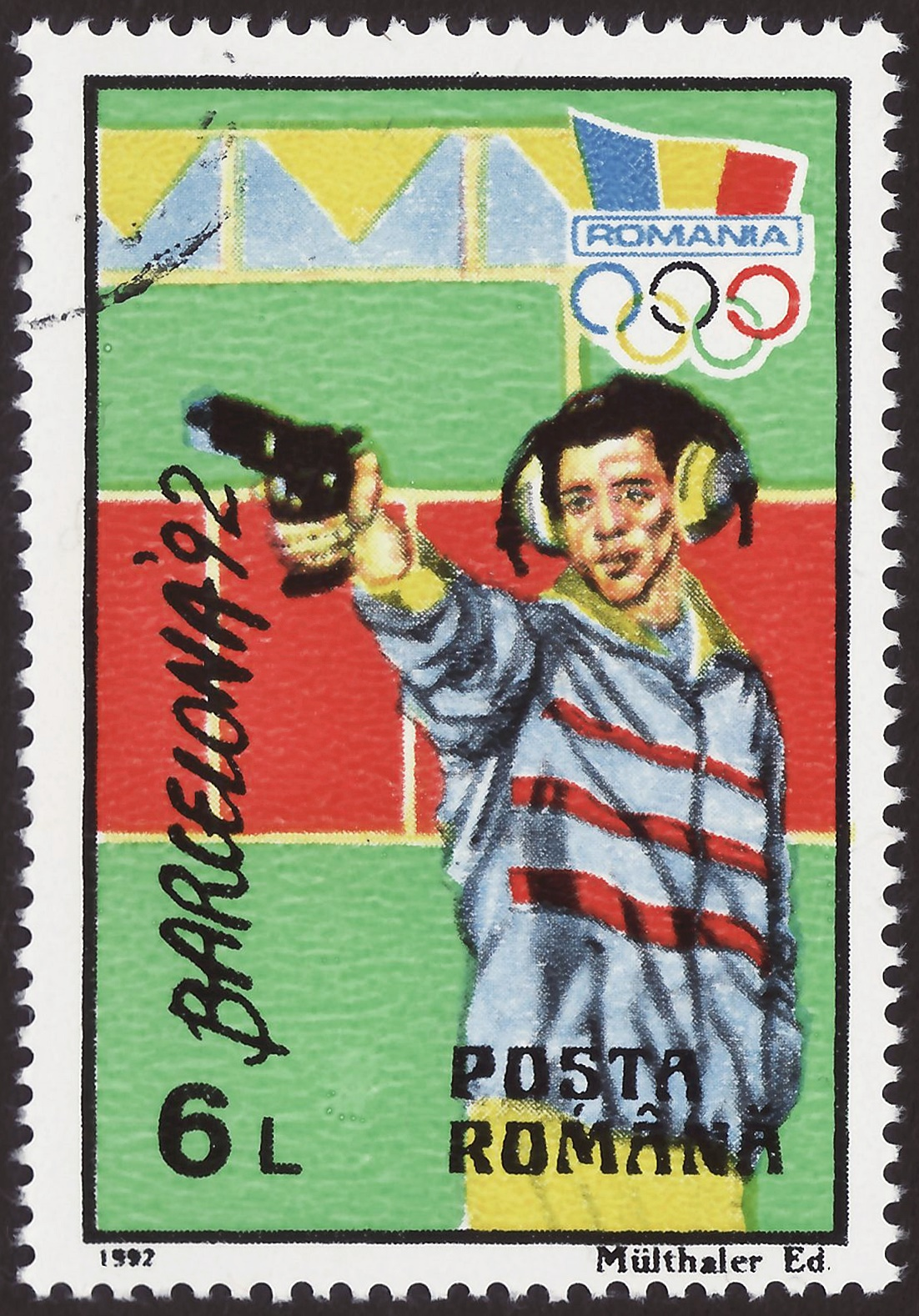
- Romanian stamp commemorating 1992 Olympic shooting
- Venue: Mollet del Vallès
- Dates: 29 July 1992; 30 July 1992
- Competitors: 30 from 23 nations
- Winning score: 885 OR

Medalists
1st place, gold medalist(s)		Ralf Schumann; Germany
2nd place, silver medalist(s)		Afanasijs Kuzmins; Latvia
3rd place, bronze medalist(s)		Vladimir Vokhmyanin; Unified Team

The men's ISSF 25 meter rapid fire pistol was one of the thirteen shooting events at the 1992 Summer Olympics. It was the first Olympic rapid fire competition on the new, circular targets, and also the only one in history to feature both a semifinal, consisting of four four-second series for the top eight shooters, and a final, consisting of two additional four-second series for the top four. Afanasijs Kuzmins (for the first time competing for independent Latvia) and Ralf Schumann, who had battled for the gold medal four years earlier, once again clinched the top two spots, although in reversed order. The two were the eighth and ninth men to win multiple medals in the event. Schumann's win was the first victory (and first medal) for unified Germany since 1936, though East Germany (including Schumann himself) had won medals since. Kuzmins earned Latvia's first independent medal (the country had competed in 1936 before being occupied by the Soviet Union). Vladimir Vokhmyanin of the Unified Team finished on the same score as Kuzmins, but a lower final score demoted him to bronze. There were 30 competitors from 23 nations. Nations had been limited to two shooters each since the 1952 Games.

== Background ==
This was the 19th appearance of what had been standardised in 1948 as the men's ISSF 25 meter rapid fire pistol event, the only event on the 2020 programme that traces back to 1896. The event has been held at every Summer Olympics except 1904 and 1928 (when no shooting events were held) and 1908; it was nominally open to women from 1968 to 1980, although very few women participated these years. The first five events were quite different, with some level of consistency finally beginning with the 1932 event—which, though it had differences from the 1924 competition, was roughly similar. The 1936 competition followed the 1932 one quite closely. The post-World War II event substantially altered the competition once again. The 1984 Games introduced women's-only shooting events, including the ISSF 25 meter pistol (though this is more similar to the non-Olympic men's ISSF 25 meter center-fire pistol than the rapid fire pistol).

Five of the eight finalists from 1988 returned: gold medalist (and 1980 top-10 finisher) Afanasijs Kuzmins of the Soviet Union (now competing for Latvia), silver medalist Ralf Schumann of East Germany (now competing for unified Germany), fifth-place finisher Adam Kaczmarek of Poland, sixth-place finisher Bernardo Tovar of Colombia, and seventh-place finisher John McNally of the United States. Schumann was the reigning (1990) world champion; Miroslav Ignatiuk of the Unified Team had finished second and Petri Eteläniemi of Finland third.

Albania made its debut in the event; twelve former Soviet republics competed together as the Unified Team. The United States made its 16th appearance, most of any nation.

== Competition format ==
The competition format used a three-round tournament for the only time, using a qualifying round, semifinal, and a final.

The qualifying round from 1988 onward was essentially the same as the full competition format from 1948–1984. Each shooter fired 60 shots. These were done in two courses of 30; each course consisted of two stages of 15; each stage consisted of three series of 5. In each stage, the time limit for each series was 8 seconds for the first, 6 seconds for the second, and 4 seconds for the third.

The 1988 tournament had added a two-series final for the top eight shooters; the 1992 competition broke that down to a four-series semifinal for the top eight and two-series final for the top four.

Eight shooters advanced to the semifinal. There, they shot four series of 5 shots each, all at 4 seconds. The semifinal score was added to the qualifying round score to give the semifinal total. The top four shooters by semifinal total advanced again to the final. There, they shot two more series of 5 shots each, again at 4 seconds, adding that score to their qualifying and semifinal rounds to give a final total. The finalists fired a total of 90 shots across the three rounds, with a maximum score of 900.

The 1992 competition introduced round targets rather than the silhouettes used from 1948 to 1988 as well as many pre-World War II versions of the event. Score, rather than hits, had been used as the primary ranking method since 1960.

== Records ==
The Official Report lists Schumann's 594 in the qualifying round as a new Olympic record, suggesting that the 598 shot by Kuzmins in 1988 was considered a different format (after the change in targets from silhouettes to round targets). The 70-shot qualifying plus final used in 1988 was not used in 1992; the 80-shot qualifying plus final and 90-shot three-round score used in 1992 were not used again.

Qualifying
World record	
Olympic record	New format

== Schedule ==
Date	Time	Round
Wednesday, 29 July 1992	9:00	Qualifying: Course 1
Thursday, 30 July 1992	9:00	Qualifying: Course 2 Semifinal; Final

== Results ==
=== Qualifying ===
Rank	Shooter	Nation	Course 1	Course 2	Total	Notes
1	Ralf Schumann	Germany	299	295	594	Q, OR
2	Adam Kaczmarek	Poland	295	296	591	Q
3	Krzysztof Kucharczyk	Poland	293	297	590	Q
4	Vladimir Vokhmyanin	Unified Team	295	295	590	Q
5	Afanasijs Kuzmins	Latvia	297	293	590	Q
6	John McNally	United States	293	294	587	Q
7	Bernardo Tovar	Colombia	294	293	587	Q
8	Miroslav Ignatiuk	Unified Team	292	294	586	Q
9	Roger Mar	United States	293	293	586	
10	Petri Eteläniemi	Finland	292	293	585	
11	Meng Gang	China	292	293	585	
11	Pierluigi Ussorio	Italy	291	294	585	
13	Iulian Raicea	Romania	290	294	584	
13	Jindřich Skupa	Czechoslovakia	293	291	584	
15	René Osthold	Germany	289	294	583	
16	Christian Kezel	France	291	291	582	
16	Anton Küchler	Switzerland	293	289	582	
16	Hans-Rudolf Schneider	Switzerland	290	292	582	
16	Juan Segui Picornell	Spain	289	293	582	
20	Kim Bong-chol	North Korea	292	289	581	
20	Emil Milev	Bulgaria	291	290	581	
22	Katsumasa Onishi	Japan	291	288	579	
22	Lajos Pálinkás	Hungary	284	295	579	
24	Ivan Dimitrov	Bulgaria	290	287	577	
25	Dimitrios Baltas	Greece	286	289	575	
26	Patrick Murray	Australia	290	284	574	
27	Nguyễn Quốc Cường	Vietnam	288	285	573	
28	Adrian Breton	Great Britain	290	281	571	
28	Sándor Kacskó	Hungary	290	281	571	
30	Kristo Robo	Albania	279	286	565	

=== Semifinal ===
Rank	Shooter	Nation	Qualifying	Semifinal					Total	Notes
Rank	Shooter	Nation	Qualifying	Series 1	Series 2	Series 3	Series 4	Total	Total	Notes
1	Ralf Schumann	Germany	594	49	49	49	48	195	789	Q
2	Vladimir Vokhmyanin	Unified Team	590	49	49	49	49	196	786	Q
3	Afanasijs Kuzmins	Latvia	590	48	49	50	48	195	785	Q
4	Krzysztof Kucharczyk	Poland	590	47	47	49	50	193	783	Q
5	John McNally	United States	587	50	48	49	47	194	781	
6	Miroslav Ignatiuk	Unified Team	586	48	50	47	48	193	779	
7	Adam Kaczmarek	Poland	591	48	45	48	46	187	778	
8	Bernardo Tovar	Colombia	587	47	48	46	48	189	776	

=== Final ===
Kuzmins prevailed over Vokhmyanin due to the final scores tie-breaker (97 to 96).

Rank	Shooter	Nation	Qualifying	Semifinal	Subtotal	Final	Total
1st place, gold medalist(s)	Ralf Schumann	Germany	594	195	789	96	885
2nd place, silver medalist(s)	Afanasijs Kuzmins	Latvia	590	195	785	97	882
3rd place, bronze medalist(s)	Vladimir Vokhmyanin	Unified Team	590	196	786	96	882
4	Krzysztof Kucharczyk	Poland	590	193	783	97	880

== Sources ==
- Games of the XXV Olympiad Barcelona 1992: The results (PDF).
