= László Balogh =

László Balogh may refer to:

- László Balogh (rower) (born 1951), Hungarian Olympic rower
- László Balogh (painter) (1930–2023), Hungarian painter
- László Balogh (sport shooter) (1958–2019), Hungarian sport shooter
