= Balogh =

Balogh is a Hungarian surname, originating from the Hungarian word bal meaning "left", possibly in reference to left-handedness.

It was the surname of a medieval noble house, Balog (genus).

Another variant is Balog.

Notable people with the surname include:

- Ádám Balogh, one of the most famous kuruc colonels during Rákóczi's War for Independence
- Ari Balogh (born 1964), American businessman and racing driver
- Béla Balogh, a Hungarian film director
- Brian Balogh, an American historian
- Ernő Balogh, a Hungarian-born and -trained classical pianist
- Fritz Balogh, a German football (soccer) player
- Gergely Balogh, Hungarian canoeist
- János Balogh (disambiguation), multiple people
- József Balogh (disambiguation), multiple people
- Kálmán Balogh, a Hungarian cimbalom player
- László Balogh (painter), Hungarian painter
- László Balogh (sport shooter) (1958–2019), Hungarian former sport shooter
- Mary Balogh, a Welsh-Canadian novelist
- Norbert Balogh, Hungarian footballer
- Steve Balogh, a member of the Canadian rock band Pink Mountaintops
- Suzanne Balogh, an Australian gold medalist in Shooting at the 2004 Summer Olympics - Women's trap
- Thomas Balogh, Baron Balogh, a Hungarian economist and member of the English House of Lords
- Zoltán Tibor Balogh, a Hungarian mathematician

== See also ==
- Balogh Defense, a chess gambit named for Janos Balogh
