= József Balogh =

József Balogh may refer to:

- József Balogh (musician) (born 1956), Hungarian musician
- József Balogh (philologist) (1893–1944), Hungarian publicist, philologist, and literary historian
- József Balogh (politician) (born 1962), Hungarian politician
- József Balogh (mathematician) (born 1971), Hungarian mathematician

== See also ==
- Balogh (surname)
