= Lauri Toikka =

Finnish athlete (1912–1966)

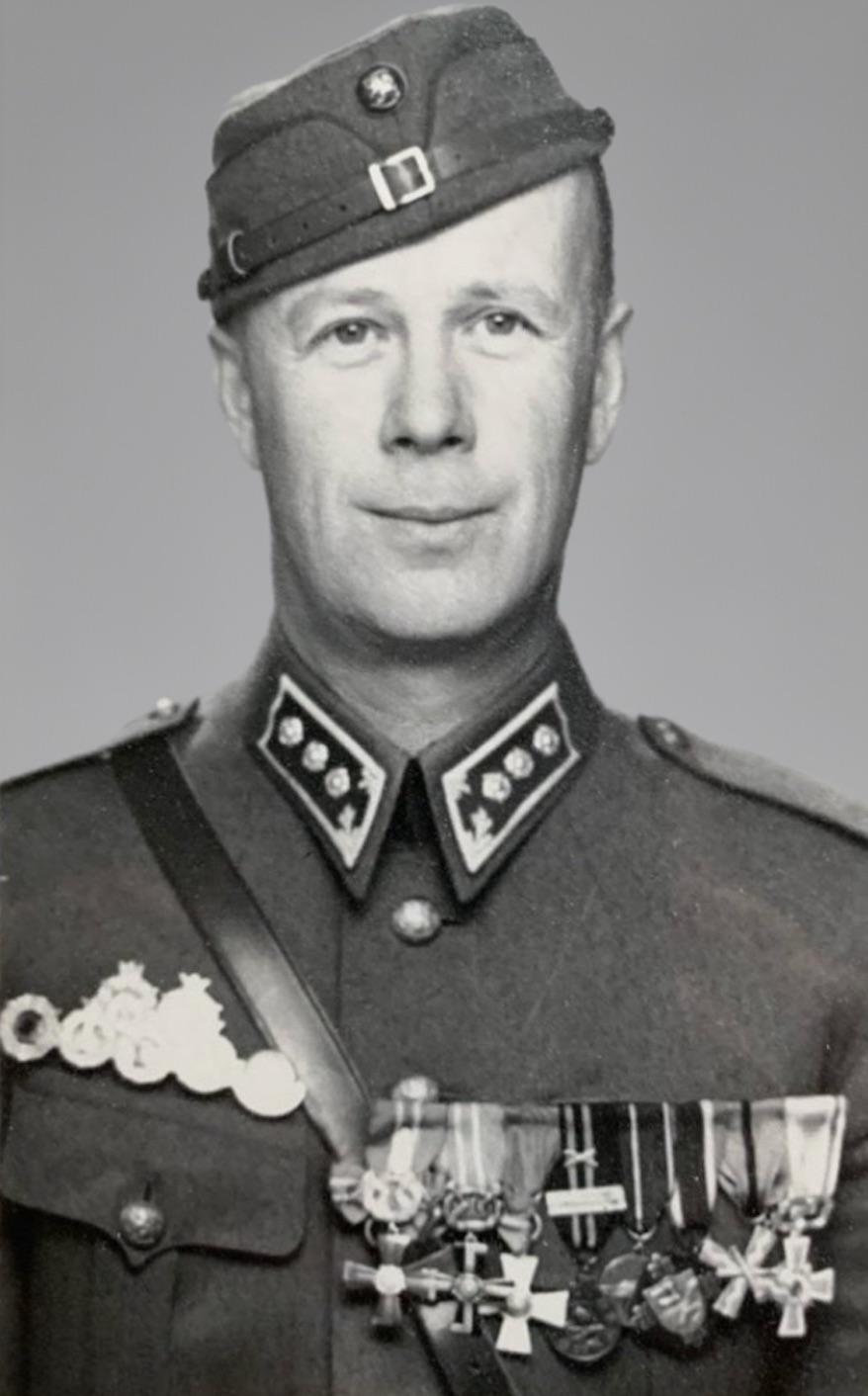
- Toikka in 1958

Personal information
- Nickname: Putte
- Nationality: Finland
- Born: Lauri Matias Toikka; 28 July 1912 Hamina, Grand Duchy of Finland
- Died: 15 December 1966 (aged 54)
- Resting place: Hamina, Finland
- Occupation: Captain
- Years active: 1930–1962
- Employer: Finnish Defense Forces
- Height: 180 cm (5 ft 11 in)
- Weight: 80 kg (176 lb; 12 st 8 lb)
- Spouse: Heidi Toikka
- Other interests: Gymnastics, wrestling

Sport
- Country: Finland
- Sport: Baseball, pistol shooting
- League: Finnish National League
- Club: Haminan Ampumaseura - HAS
- Team: Haminan Palloilijat - HP

Achievements and titles
- World finals: World Championships: Oslo in 1952 and Caracas in 1954 European Championships: Bucharest in 1955 and Milano in 1959
- National finals: Baseball National Champion in 1939
- Highest world ranking: Pistol shooting Team Gold 1954 in Caracas
- Personal best(s): Finnish National record in the 25-meter rapid pistol in 1950. Finnish National Champion in pistol shooting seven times between 1947 and 1962

Lauri Matias Toikka (28 July 1912 – 15 December 1966) was a Finnish National League Baseball (Pesäpallo) player and a sports shooter.

== Early life ==
Lauri "Putte" Matias Toikka was born in Hamina, located within the Grand Duchy of Finland, an autonomous part of the Russian Empire at the time, now known as Finland. His parents were Matti Toikka, a merchant, and Sievä Toikka (née Järvinen). From a young age, Lauri displayed a keen interest in sports, actively participating in gymnastics and wrestling.

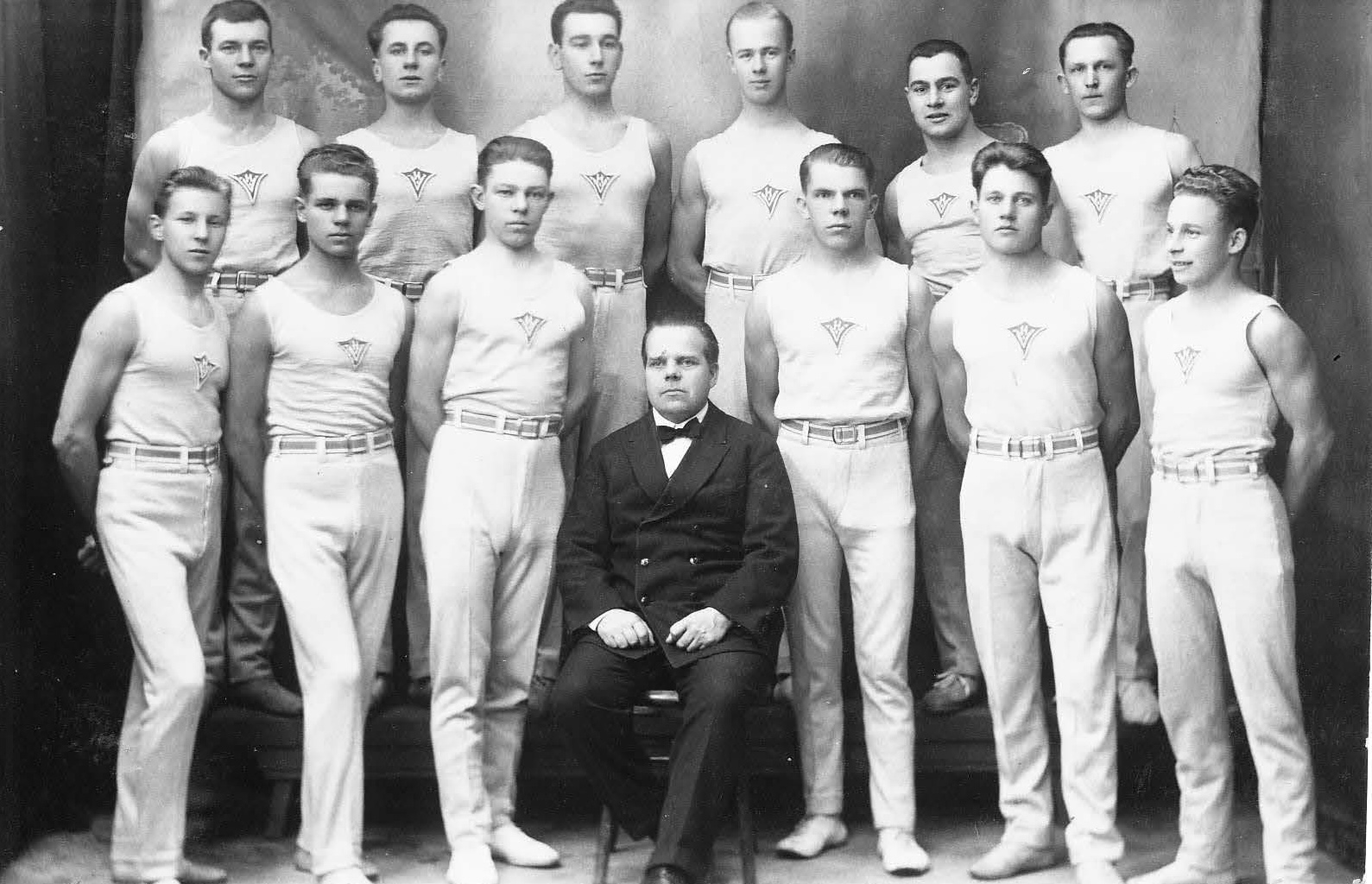
1920s Finnish gymnastics team, with Toikka identifiable as the third person from the right in the back row

== Baseball ==
Toikka played with Haminan Palloilijat throughout the 1930s. A significant highlight of his career was in 1939 when the team won the Finnish National League Championship. The decisive game against Toijalan Pallo-Veikot was played on 8 October 1939. Kymen Sanomat, a Finnish newspaper, hailed Toikka as the hero of the match due to his performance.

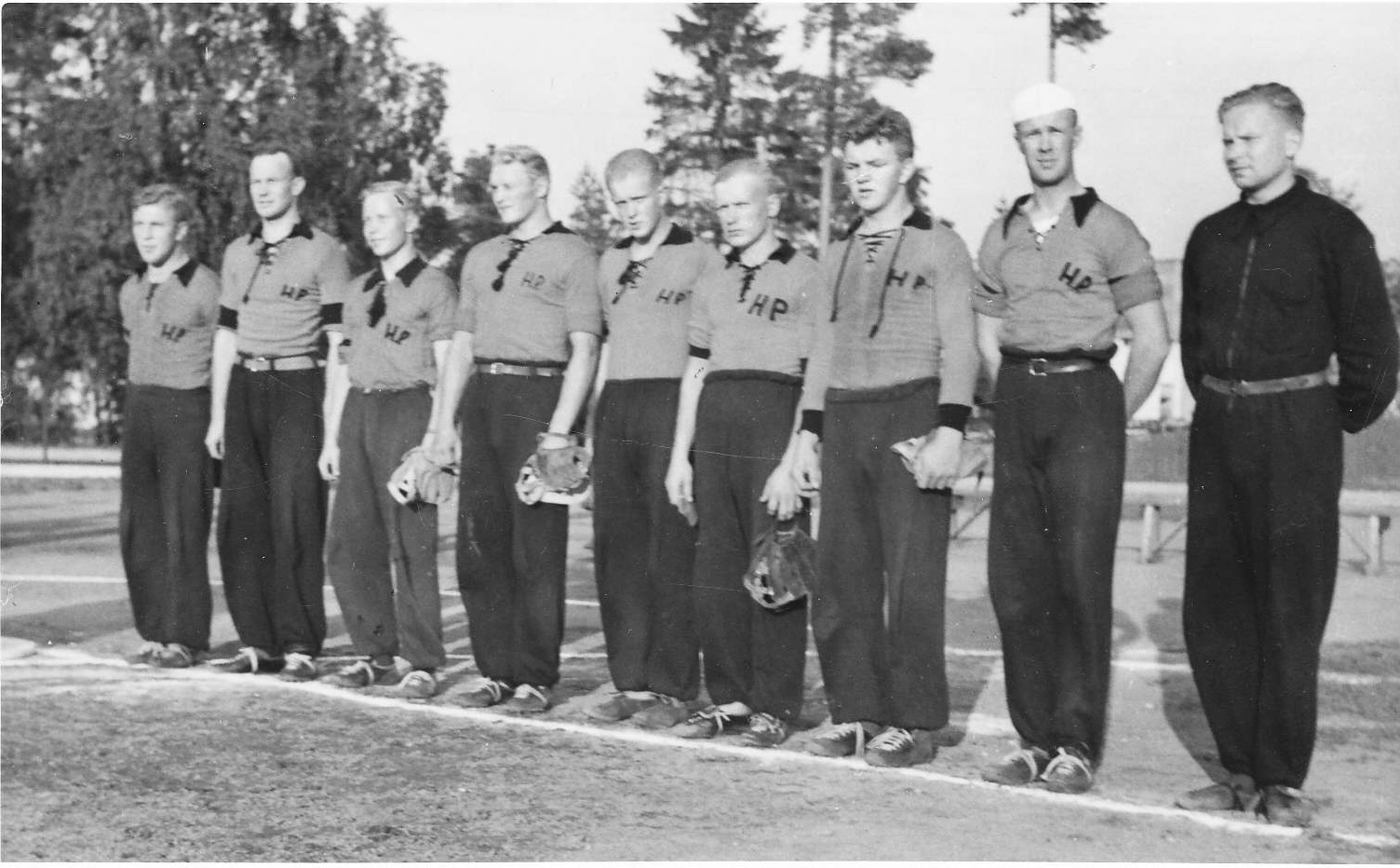
Haminan Palloilijat baseball national championship team in 1939 with Toikka second from the right

== Sports shooting ==
Toikka was a distinguished figure in Finnish shooting sports, winning the Finnish Championship seven times across various pistol shooting disciplines between 1947 and 1962. He set a national record in the 25 m rapid-fire pistol event, scoring 297 points in 1950.

Internationally, Toikka represented Finland in numerous World and European Championships as part of the Finnish Men's Shooting team. His most notable achievements are listed below.

World Championships, men's team:

- Silver in 1952, in the 25 meter rapid-fire pistol in Oslo.
- Bronze in 1954, in the 25 meter rapid-fire pistol in Caracas.
- Gold in 1954, in the Venezuela Center-fire pistol (Pistola Venezolana) in Caracas.

The Finnish sports shooting team at the 1954 ISSF World Championships in Caracas included Väinö Heusala, Pentti Linnosvuo, Leonard Ravilo, and Toikka.

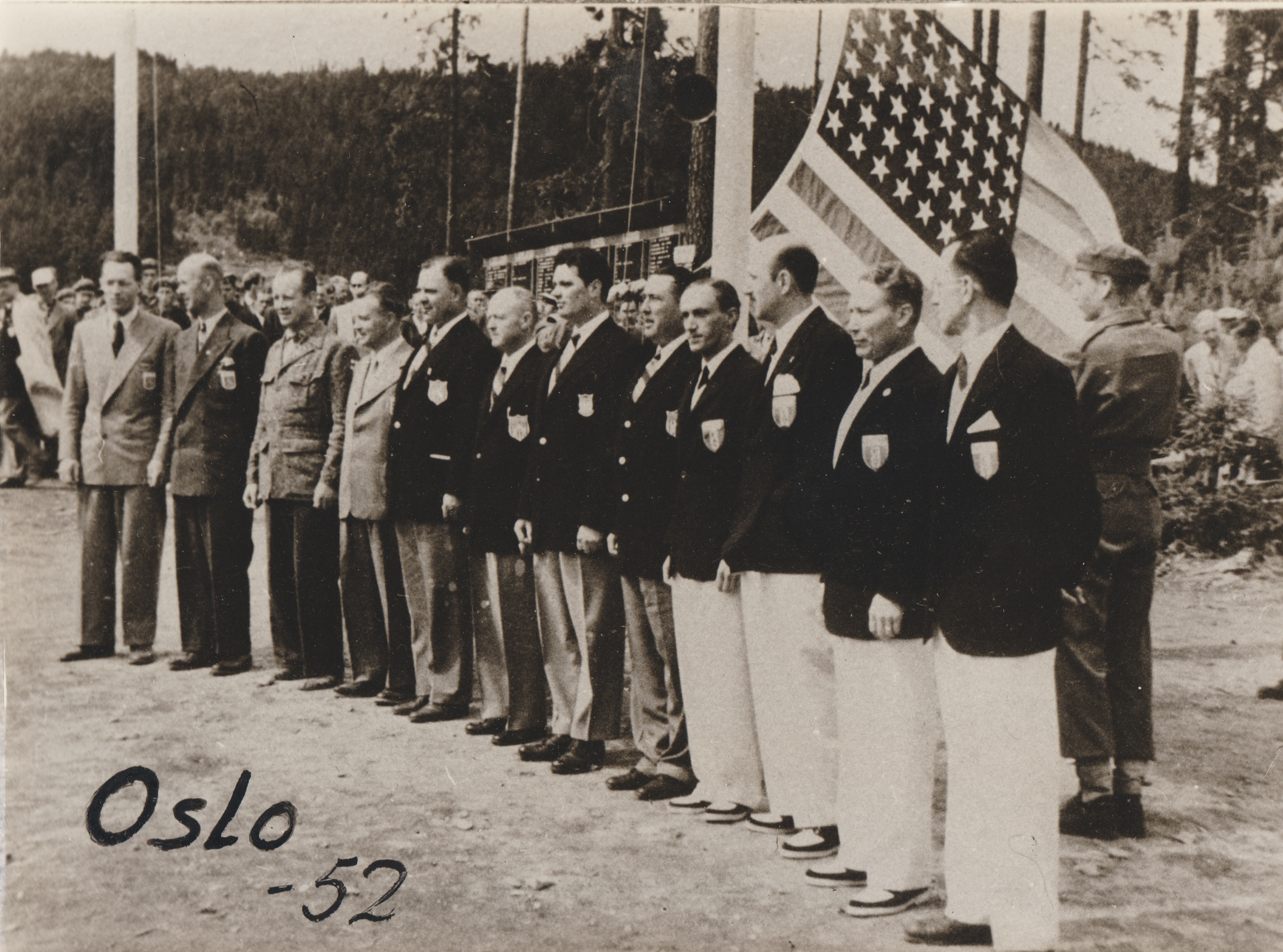
Teams from the United States (gold), Finland (silver), and Argentina (bronze) in the 25-meter rapid fire pistol event at the 1952 ISSF World Championships in Oslo, with Toikka second from the left. The other Finnish pistol team members pictured include Väinö Heusala, Veli-Jussi Hölsö and Leonard Ravilo.

European Championship, Men's team:

- Silver in 1955, in the 25-meter rapid-fire pistol in Bucharest.

Based on the competition records achieved and maintained by the Suomen Urheilumuseosäätiö (Finnish Sports Museum Foundation), Toikka represented Finland in the Nordic Championships, achieving the following:

- Bronze in 1950, in the 25-meter rapid-fire pistol in Copenhagen.
- Team gold in 1954, in the 25-meter rapid-fire pistol in Stockholm. The Finnish team comprised Pentti Linnosvuo, Väinö Heusala, Toikka, Leonard Ravilo, and Peter Löfgren.
- Bronze in 1957, in the 25-meter rapid-fire pistol in Turku.

== Military career ==
Toikka served in the Finnish Defense Forces from 1930 to 1958.

=== Second World War ===
At the beginning of World War II, Toikka fought in the Winter War in the Battle of Kollaa. During the Continuation War, he served as lieutenant and led a company through several key battles in Virolahti, Ino, Aleksandrowska, Kivennapa, Heinjoki, Kääntymä, Juustila and Kiviniemi.

=== Nomination for Mannerheim Cross ===
Colonel Kaarlo Raunio, supported by Major General Antero Svensson, nominated Toikka for the Mannerheim Cross, which is Finland's highest military decoration, in recognition of his valor and bravery during the Battle of Kollaa. However, he did not receive the Mannerheim Cross, and the reason why Toikka was among the 109 nominees who did not receive this honor remains unknown. Nevertheless, his service was recognized through multiple other decorations, including being twice honored with the Cross of Liberty, Order of the Cross of Liberty.

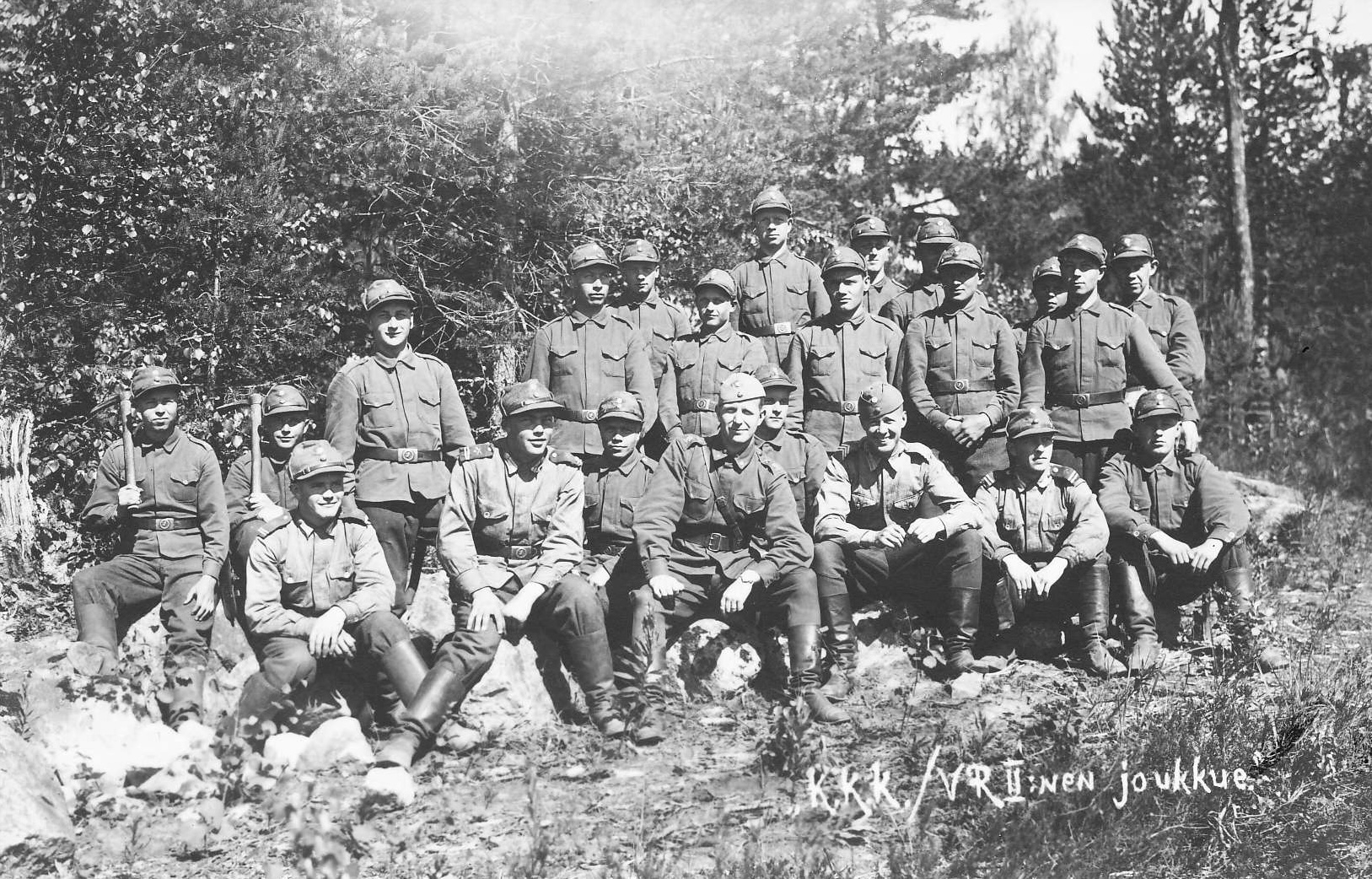
Toikka during World War II

=== Post-war career ===
After his wartime service, Toikka continued his career in the military by training future officers at the Reserve Officer School.

In recognition of his service, he was awarded the Order of the Lion of Finland (SLR) in 1955.

He retired from the Finnish Defense Forces as a captain in 1958.

== Retirement ==
After his military career, Toikka initially worked as a procurement manager with Toikka & Co, a construction company. Later, he took on the role of a bank office manager with Vehkalahden Säästöpankki until his retirement in 1962.

Even after retiring, he remained active in various leadership roles, including serving as the secretary and treasurer of the HAS shooting club.

== Death ==
Toikka died at the age of 54 on 15 December 1966, due to a heart attack. According to the Finnish government-issued military personnel record available online, he is survived by his wife, Heidi, and their three children, Timo, Matti, and Sirkka.

== Legacy ==
In 1958, the Ministry of Education and Culture awarded Lauri "Putte" Toikka Cross of Merit of the Finnish Sport. He was an active and respected figure in the shooting sports community, earning the admiration of his colleagues. An annual national competition named in his honor was held at the Hamina shooting range from 1967 to 2005.
