= Balog =

Balog is a Hungarian surname.

It was the surname of a medieval noble house, Balog (genus).

Another variant is Balogh.

Notable people with the surname include:

- Ana Balog (1930–1945), Uruguayan Jewish Holocaust victim
- Bob Balog (1924–2011), American football player in the National Football League
- Csaba Balog (born 1972), Hungarian football (midfielder) player
- Gábor Balog (born 1990), Hungarian Olympic swimmer
- Henry Balog (died 1300), Hungarian nobleman in the 14th century
- Ildikó Balog (born 1977), Hungarian gymnast
- Imre Balog (born 1991), Hungarian chess grandmaster
- James Balog (born 1952), American photographer whose work revolves around the relationship between humans and nature
- Leonarda Balog (born 1993), Croatian football player
- Lester Balog (1905–1976), labor activist and founding member of the Workers' Film & Photo League
- Nicoleta Balog (born 1994), Romanian handballer
- Paul Balog (numismatist) (1900–1982), Hungarian-born Italian numismatist, archaeologist and physician
- Paul Balog (bishop of Pécs), bishop of Pécs, Hungary between 1293 and 1306
- Paul Balog (bishop of Veszprém) (died 1275), Hungarian prelate, Bishop of Veszprém from 1263 until his death
- Tibor Balog (footballer, born 1963)
- Tibor Balog (footballer, born 1966)
- Vilmos Balog (born 1975), Hungarian boxer
- Zoltán Balog (astronomer) (born 1972), astronomer with the Steward Observatory at the University of Arizona
- Zoltán Balog (bishop) (born 1958), Hungarian Reformed bishop and former politician
- Zoltán Balog (footballer) (born 1978), Hungarian football defender
- Zoltán Balog (politician) (born 1958), Hungarian politician
- Zsolt Balog (born 1978), Hungarian football (defender) player
- Zvonimir Balog (1932–2014), Croatian children's fiction writer
- Nikola Balog (born 2005), Montenegrin Artist
- Ariel Balog (born 1997), São Paulo, Brazil

== See also ==
- Čierny Balog, municipality in Brezno District, in the Banská Bystrica Region of central Slovakia
- Balog nad Ipľom, village and municipality in the Veľký Krtíš District of the Banská Bystrica Region of southern Slovakia
