= Zoltán Balog =

Zoltán Balog may refer to:

- Zoltán Balog (astronomer) (born 1972), Hungarian astronomer
- Zoltán Balog (footballer) (born 1978), Hungarian footballer
- Zoltán Balog (bishop) (born 1958), Hungarian Calvinist pastor and politician
