= Hyka =

Hyka is an Albanian and Czech surname. Their origins are unrelated. The Czech feminine form is Hyková.

Notable people with the surname include:

- Jahmir Hyka (born 1988), Albanian footballer
- Lenka Hyková (born 1985), Czech sport shooter, daughter of Vladimír
- Skënder Hyka (1944–2018), Albanian footballer
- Tomáš Hyka (born 1993), Czech ice hockey player
- Vladimír Hyka (born 1952), Czech sport shooter
