= Skupa =

Skupa, feminine Skupová, is a Czech surname. Notable people with the surname include:

- Jindřich Skupa (born 1962), Czech sports shooter
- Josef Skupa (1892–1957), Czech puppeteer
