= János Balogh =

János Balogh may refer to:

- János Nagy Balogh (1874–1919), Hungarian painter
- János Balogh (chess player) (1892–1980), Hungarian–Romanian chess master
- János Balogh (biologist) (1913–2002), Hungarian biologist
- János Balogh (footballer) (born 1982), Hungarian football goalkeeper
- Janoš Bologh (speedway rider) in 1988 Individual Speedway World Championship

== See also ==
- Balogh (surname)
