= Ivan Dimitrov =

Ivan Dimitrov may refer to:

- Ivan Dimitrov (footballer) (1935–2019), Bulgarian football defender
- Ivan Dimitrov (sport shooter) (born 1973), Bulgarian sports shooter
- Ivan Dimitrov (volleyball) (born 1952), Bulgarian volleyball player
- Ivan Dimitrov (handball) (born 2000), Macedonia handball player
