= Hans Schneider =

Hans Schneider may refer to:

- Hans Schneider (ice hockey) (1913–1993), Austrian ice hockey player
- Hans Schneider (mathematician) (1927–2014), mathematician in the United States
- Hans Schneider (water polo) (1909–1972), German water polo player
- Hans Ernst Schneider (1909–1999), German professor of literature under the alias Hans Schwerte
- Hans Ernst Schneider (athlete) (1927–2014), Swiss sprinter
- Hans Joachim Schneider (1928–2015), German jurist, criminologist and psychologist
- Hans Schneider (footballer), Swiss footballer
- Hans-Rudolf Schneider (born 1956), Swiss sports shooter
- Johannes "Hans" Schneider (1887–1914), German footballer
