= Kļava =

Kļava is a Latvian surname. Notable people with the surname include:

- Kārlis Kļava (1907–1941), Latvian military officer and sports shooter
- Oskars Kļava (born 1983), Latvian football defender
