= Sevieri =

Sevieri is an Italian surname. Notable people with the surname include:

- Alberto Sevieri (born 1945), Italian sport shooter
- Federico Sevieri (born 1991), Italian footballer
