= Tom Treinen =

American sports shooter

Personal information
- Born: March 9, 1943 (age 83) Le Mars, Iowa, United States

Sport
- Sport: Sports shooting

Tom Treinen (born March 9, 1943) is an American sports shooter. He competed in the men's 25 metre rapid fire pistol event at the 1976 Summer Olympics.
