= Nguyễn Đức Uýnh =

Vietnamese sports shooter

Personal information
- Nationality: Vietnamese
- Born: 10 February 1955 (age 70) Gia Lộc district, Hải Dương

Sport
- Sport: Sports shooting

Nguyễn Đức Uýnh (born 10 February 1955) is a Vietnamese former sports shooter.

== Early life ==
Nguyễn Đức Úynh was born on 10 February 1955, in Gia Lộc district, Hải Dương (now Haiphong). His father died early, and Úynh was raised as the eldest brother in a large and poor family. He had to work with his mother to support his younger siblings' education.

== Career ==
He competed in the mixed 25 metre rapid fire pistol event at the 1980 Summer Olympics.

He won a gold medal in 1989 SEA Games.

In 2005, he was named head coach of the Vietnamese national shooter team.

== Personal life ==
As of 2022, he and his family live in Australia.
