= Khamsing =

Laotian sports shooter

Personal information
- Nationality: Laotian
- Born: 1 January 1961 (age 64)

Sport
- Sport: Sports shooting

Khamsing (born 1 January 1961) is a Laotian sports shooter. He competed in the mixed 25 metre rapid fire pistol event at the 1980 Summer Olympics.
