= Kell Runland =

Danish sports shooter (born 1942)

Personal information
- Nationality: Danish
- Born: 11 January 1942 (age 83); Copenhagen, Denmark

Sport
- Sport: Sports shooting

Kell Runland (born 11 January 1942) is a Danish sports shooter. He competed in the men's 25 metre rapid fire pistol event at the 1976 Summer Olympics.
