= Břetislav Putna =

Czech sport shooter

Personal information
- Nationality: Czech
- Born: 30 April 1959 (age 66) Brno, Czechoslovakia

Sport
- Sport: Sport shooting

Břetislav Putna (born 30 April 1959) is a Czech sport shooter. He competed in the men's 25 metre rapid fire pistol event at the 1988 Summer Olympics.
