= Fernando Gomes (sport shooter) =

Brazilian sports shooter

Personal information
- Born: 10 June 1954 (age 70); Rio de Janeiro, Brazil

Sport
- Sport: Sports shooting

Fernando Gomes (born 10 June 1954) is a Brazilian sports shooter. He competed in the mixed 25 metre rapid fire pistol event at the 1980 Summer Olympics.
