= Juan Marchand =

Puerto Rican sports shooter

Personal information
- Nationality: Puerto Rican
- Born: 6 April 1949 (age 75)

Sport
- Sport: Sports shooting

Juan Marchand (born 6 April 1949) is a Puerto Rican sports shooter. He competed in the men's 25 metre rapid fire pistol event at the 1976 Summer Olympics.
