= Ugo Amicosante =

Italian sport shooter (1930–2019)

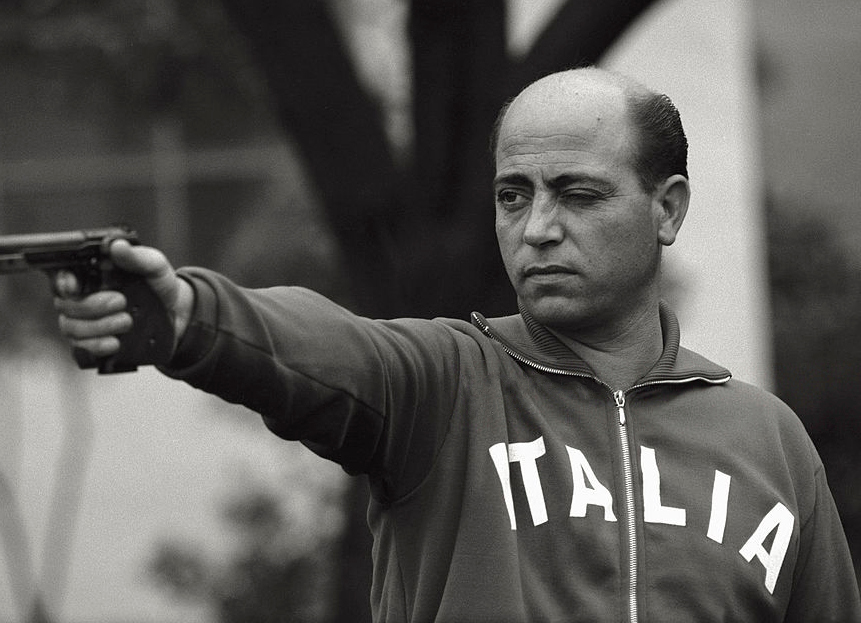
- Ugo Amicosante at the 1964 Olympics

Personal information
- Born: 8 August 1930 Molina Aterno, L'Aquila, Italy
- Died: 23 May 2019 (aged 88)
- Height: 1.70 m (5 ft 7 in)
- Weight: 76 kg (168 lb)

Sport
- Sport: Pistol shooting
- Club: Tiro a Segno Nazionale, Rome
Medal record
Representing Italy
World championships
Bronze medal – third place	1962 Cairo	25 m rapid fire, team
Gold medal – first place	1970 Phoenix	25 m rapid fire, team

Ugo Amicosante (8 August 1930 – 23 May 2019) was an Italian pistol shooter. He competed in the 25 m rapid-fire pistol event at the 1964 and 1968 Olympics and finished in 18th and 36th place, respectively. At the world championships Amicosante won a bronze medal in 1962 and a gold medal in 1970 with Italian teams.
