= Wibout Jolles =

Dutch sports shooter

Personal information
- Nationality: Dutch
- Born: 10 January 1954 (age 71); The Hague, Netherlands

Sport
- Sport: Sports shooting

Wibout Jolles (born 10 January 1954) is a Dutch sports shooter. He competed in the mixed 25 metre rapid fire pistol event at the 1980 Summer Olympics.
