= Pierluigi Ussorio =

Italian sports shooter

Personal information
- Nationality: Italian
- Born: 10 May 1967 (age 57); Naples, Italy

Sport
- Sport: Sports shooting

Pierluigi Ussorio (born 10 May 1967) is an Italian sports shooter. He competed in the men's 25 metre rapid fire pistol event at the 1992 Summer Olympics.
