= Jaime Vives =

Puerto Rican sports shooter

Personal information
- Nationality: Puerto Rican
- Born: 3 February 1946 (age 79)

Sport
- Sport: Sports shooting

Jaime Vives (born 3 February 1946) is a Puerto Rican sports shooter. He competed in the men's 25 metre rapid fire pistol event at the 1976 Summer Olympics.
