= Olavi Heikkinen =

Finnish sports shooter

Personal information
- Nationality: Finnish
- Born: 27 April 1944 (age 80); Rovaniemi, Finland

Sport
- Sport: Sports shooting

Olavi Heikkinen (born 27 April 1944) is a Finnish sports shooter. He competed in the mixed 25 metre rapid fire pistol event at the 1980 Summer Olympics.
