= Christian Raynaud =

Belgian sports shooter

Personal information
- Nationality: Belgian
- Born: 28 April 1946 (age 78); Rive-de-Gier, France

Sport
- Sport: Sports shooting

Christian Raynaud (born 28 April 1946) is a Belgian sports shooter. He competed in the mixed 25 metre rapid fire pistol event at the 1980 Summer Olympics.
