= Todor Stoimenov =

Bulgarian sports shooter

Personal information
- Nationality: Bulgarian
- Born: 22 August 1958 (age 66)

Sport
- Sport: Sports shooting

Todor Stoimenov (born 22 August 1958) is a Bulgarian sports shooter. He competed in the mixed 25 metre rapid fire pistol event at the 1980 Summer Olympics.
