= Osvaldo Scandola =

Argentine sports shooter

Personal information
- Nationality: Argentine
- Born: 18 October 1939 (age 85)

Sport
- Sport: Sports shooting

Osvaldo Scandola (born 18 October 1939) is an Argentine sports shooter. He competed in the men's 25 metre rapid fire pistol event at the 1976 Summer Olympics.
