= Somboon Pattra =

Thai sports shooter

Personal information
- Nationality: Thai
- Born: 26 May 1932 (age 92)

Sport
- Sport: Sports shooting

Somboon Pattra (born 26 May 1932) is a Thai sports shooter. He competed in the men's 25 metre rapid fire pistol event at the 1976 Summer Olympics.
