= René Osthold =

German sports shooter

Personal information
- Nationality: German
- Born: 21 June 1965 (age 59); Butzbach, Germany

Sport
- Sport: Sports shooting

René Osthold (born 21 June 1965) is a German sports shooter. He competed in the men's 25 metre rapid fire pistol event at the 1992 Summer Olympics.
