= Andreas Franke =

German sports shooter

Personal information
- Nationality: German
- Born: 18 November 1954 (age 70); Dornreichenbach, Germany

Sport
- Sport: Sports shooting

Andreas Franke (born 18 November 1954) is a German sports shooter. He competed in the mixed 25 metre rapid fire pistol event at the 1980 Summer Olympics.
