= Steven Kelly (sport shooter) =

Canadian sports shooter

Personal information
- Full name: Steven Thomas Kelly
- Born: 24 September 1952 (age 72); Ottawa, Ontario, Canada

Sport
- Sport: Sports shooting

Steven Thomas Kelly (born 24 September 1952) is a Canadian sports shooter. He competed in the men's 25 metre rapid fire pistol event at the 1976 Summer Olympics.
