= Maciej Orlik =

Polish sports shooter (1938–2024)

Personal information
- Nationality: Polish
- Born: 6 April 1938; Dorohusk, Poland
- Died: 25 August 2024 (aged 86)

Sport
- Sport: Sports shooting

Maciej Orlik (6 April 1938 – 25 August 2024) was a Polish sports shooter. He competed in the men's 25 metre rapid fire pistol event at the 1976 Summer Olympics.
