= Marco Hidalgo (sport shooter) =

Costa Rican sports shooter

Personal information
- Born: 13 December 1959 (age 65); San José, Costa Rica

Sport
- Sport: Sports shooting

Marco Vinicio Hidalgo (born 13 December 1959) is a Costa Rican sports shooter. He competed in the mixed 25 metre rapid fire pistol event at the 1980 Summer Olympics. He held the Costan Rican national title for a time.
