= Gábor Plank =

Hungarian sports shooter

Personal information
- Nationality: Hungarian
- Born: 14 September 1951 (age 74) Budapest, Hungary

Sport
- Sport: Sports shooting

Gábor Plank (born 14 September 1951) is a Hungarian sports shooter. He competed in the mixed 25 metre rapid fire pistol event at the 1980 Summer Olympics.
