= Roger Mar =

American sports shooter

Personal information
- Nationality: American
- Born: April 30, 1968 (age 58) Colorado Springs, Colorado, United States

Sport
- Sport: Sports shooting

Roger Mar (born April 30, 1968) is an American sports shooter. He competed at the 1992 Summer Olympics and the 1996 Summer Olympics.
