= Tibor Balog (footballer, born 1963) =

Hungarian footballer

Personal information
- Date of birth: 31 August 1963 (age 63)
- Place of birth: Kiskunmajsa
- Positions: Defender; defensive midfielder

Senior career*
Years	Team	Apps	(Gls)
1980–1989	Vasas SC		
1989–1990	Újpesti Dózsa SC		
1990–1994	AS Verbroedering Geel		
1994–1998	Sint-Truidense V.V.		
1998–1999	K.S.K. Heist		
1999–2000	K.V.V. Vigor Beringen		

International career
1985–1989	Hungary	10	(0)
- * Club domestic league appearances and goals

Tibor Balog (born 31 August 1963) is a retired Hungarian football defender.
