= Walter Boninsegni =

Italian sports shooter

Personal information
- Born: 27 July 1902 Mestre, Italy
- Died: 3 January 1991 (aged 88) Rimini, Italy

Sport
- Sport: Sports shooting

Walter Boninsegni (27 July 1902 – 3 January 1991) was an Italian sports shooter. He competed at the 1932, 1936 and 1948 Summer Olympics.
