= Pranas Giedrimas =

Lithuanian sport shooter

Medal record

Men's shooting

Representing Lithuania

World Championships
Silver medal – second place	1937 Helsinki	25 m rapid fire
Silver medal – second place	1937 Helsinki	25 m RP Team
Silver medal – second place	1939 Liuzern	25 m RP Team

Pranas Giedrimas was a Lithuanian sport shooter.

In 1937, he won silver at 25 m rapid fire pistol individual and team events. In 1939, he won another silver in team event.
