= Alfred Radke =

German sports shooter

Personal information
- Nationality: German
- Born: 9 October 1934 Berlin, Germany
- Died: 5 February 2023 (aged 88) Hohentengen, Baden-Württemberg, Germany

Sport
- Sport: Sports shooting

Alfred Radke (9 October 1934 – 5 February 2023) was a German sports shooter. He competed in the men's 25 metre rapid fire pistol event at the 1984 Summer Olympics.
