= Olympic Shooting Range, L'Acadie =

Firing range in Quebec, Canada built for the 1976 Summer Olympics

Coordinates: 45.370774°N 73.376330°W

The Olympic Shooting Range, L'Acadie was a firing range located in L'Acadie, Quebec. For the 1976 Summer Olympics held in neighbouring Montreal, it hosted the shooting and the shooting part of the modern pentathlon events.
