= Sándor Kacskó =

Hungarian sports shooter

Personal information
- Nationality: Hungarian
- Born: 14 January 1960 (age 65); Jászberény, Hungary

Sport
- Sport: Sports shooting

Sándor Kacskó (born 14 January 1960) is a Hungarian sports shooter. He competed in the men's 25 metre rapid fire pistol event at the 1992 Summer Olympics.
