= Pentti Linnosvuo =

Finnish sport shooter

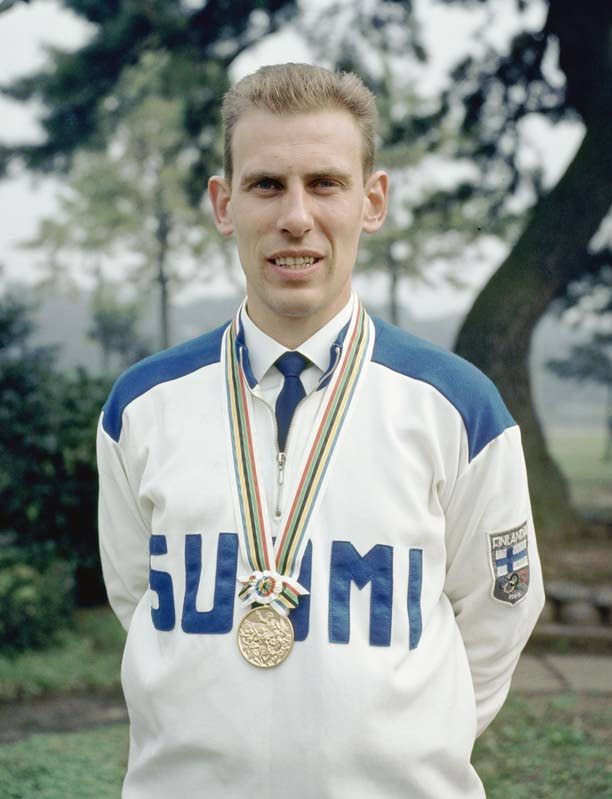
- Pentti Linnosvuo in 1964

Personal information
- Born: 27 March 1933 Vaasa, Finland
- Died: 13 July 2010 (aged 77) Helsinki, Finland

Sport
- Sport: Sports shooting
- Event: Pistol
Medal record
Representing Finland
Olympic Games
Gold medal – first place	1956 Melbourne	50 m pistol
Gold medal – first place	1964 Tokyo	25 m rapid fire pistol
Silver medal – second place	1960 Rome	25 m rapid fire pistol
World Championships
Bronze medal – third place	1954 Caracas	25 m rapid fire pistol, individual
Bronze medal – third place	1954 Caracas	25 m rapid fire pistol, team

Pentti Tapio Aleksi Linnosvuo (17 March 1933 – 13 July 2010) was a Finnish sport shooter. Together with Alfred Lane, he is the only Olympic competitor to win gold medals in both 50 m pistol and 25 m rapid fire pistol – the technique differs much between these two events, and hence few modern top-level shooters attempt to excel in both. He competed at five consecutive Olympics in 1952–1968, winning two gold medals and a silver.

Linnosvuo was born in Vaasa, but grew up in Helsinki, where he played ice hockey with Helsingin Jalkapalloklubi, and basketball and football with Sudet. He took up shooting aged 15, first with a rifle, but then changed to pistol, which was easier to handle for a left-handed person. In 1951 he won his first national title, and at the 1952 Olympics placed fifth in the 25 m rapid fire event. He later won 15 more national titles in 1952–1967 and served as the Finnish flag bearer at the 1968 Olympics. He took part in five world championships, but medalled only in his first one in 1954.

While competing, in 1957–65 Linnosvuo was employed by S Group, a Finnish retailing organization. After that he worked with M-real Corporation, a Finnish pulp and paper company, and coached Finnish, West German, Swiss and Norwegian national pistol teams. From 1983 to 1999 he served as president of the Finnish Hunting Association and in 1995–98 headed the Finnish Olympic Winners Association.
