= István Jambrik =

Hungarian sports shooter

Personal information
- Nationality: Hungarian
- Born: 19 June 1968 (age 56); Budapest, Hungary

Sport
- Sport: Sports shooting

István Jambrik (born 19 June 1968) is a Hungarian sports shooter. He competed in two events at the 2000 Summer Olympics.
