= Virgil Atanasiu =

Romanian sports shooter

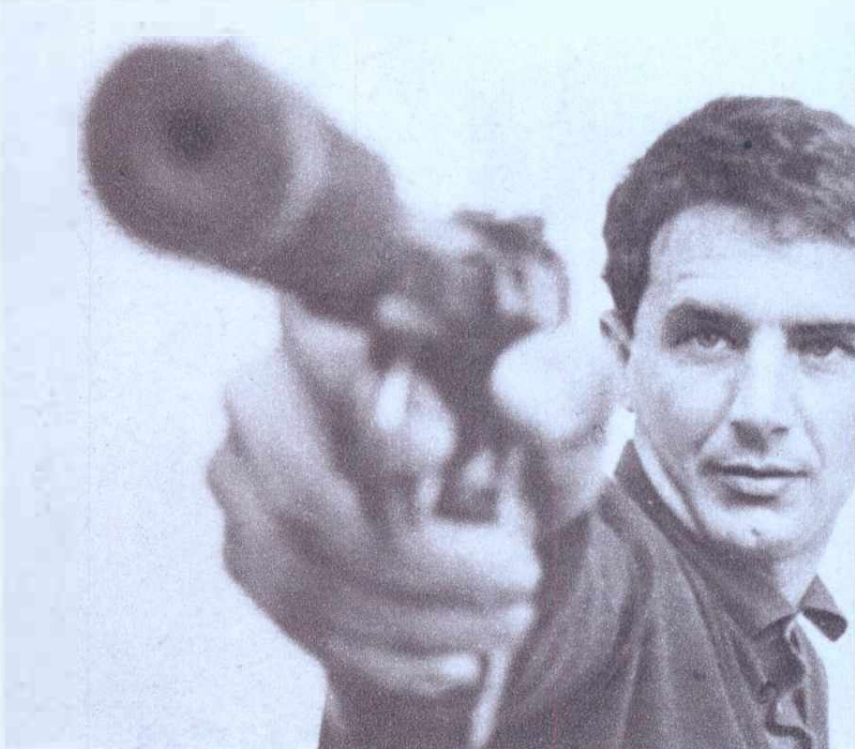

Personal information
- Born: 21 May 1937 (age 89) Dumbrăveni, Romania

Sport
- Sport: Sports shooting

Virgil Atanasiu (born 21 May 1937) is a Romanian former sports shooter. He competed in the 25 metre pistol event at the 1968 Summer Olympics.
