= Zoltán Kovács (sport shooter) =

Hungarian sports shooter

Olympic medal record

Men's shooting

Representing Hungary
Bronze medal – third place	1988 Seoul	rapid fire pistol

Zoltán Kovács (born 2 January 1964) is a Hungarian former sport shooter who competed in the 1988 Summer Olympics.
