= József Balogh (musician) =

Hungarian clarinetist

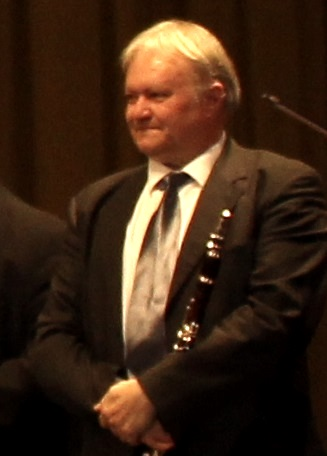
Jószef Balog at the New Year's Concert 2016 in Warburg

József Balogh (born 1956) is a Hungarian clarinetist.

Balogh was a student of Béla Kovács at the Franz Liszt College of Music in Budapest. He is a solo clarinetist in the Budapest Opera and Budapest Radio Symphony Orchestra. He has been the president of the Hungarian Clarinet Society since 1994.

== Discography ==
- Contrasts - Hungarian Clarinet Music, with various artists. FonTrade, 1990
- Mozart: Clarinet Trio, Clarinet Quartets, with various artists. Naxos, 1994.
- Brahms: Clarinet Trio & Quintet, with Danubius Quartet. Naxos, 1994.
- Beethoven: Chamber Music For Horns, Winds And Strings, with various artists. Naxos, 1995.
- Adagio Beethoven, with various artists. Naxos, 1997.
- Music for the Mozart Effect, with various artists. Spring Hill Music, 1998.
- Mozart Effect: Music for Little Ones, with various artists. Children's Group, 2000.
- Interclarinet, with various artists. Farao Classics, 2007.
