= Jonas Miliauskas =

Lithuanian sport shooter

Medal record

Men's shooting

Representing Lithuania

World Championships
Bronze medal – third place	1939 Lucerne	25 m rapid fire
Silver medal – second place	1939 Lucerne	25 m RP Team

Jonas Miliauskas is a Lithuanian sport shooter.

In 1939, Miliauskas won silver at 25 m rapid fire pistol individual and team events.
