= Ivan Dimitrov (sport shooter) =

Bulgarian sports shooter

Personal information
- Nationality: Bulgarian
- Born: 9 December 1973 (age 51)

Sport
- Sport: Sports shooting

Ivan Dimitrov (Bulgarian: Иван Димитров), born the 9th of December, 1973, is a Bulgarian sports shooter. He competed in the men's 25 metre rapid fire pistol event at the 1992 Summer Olympics.
