= János Nagy Balogh =

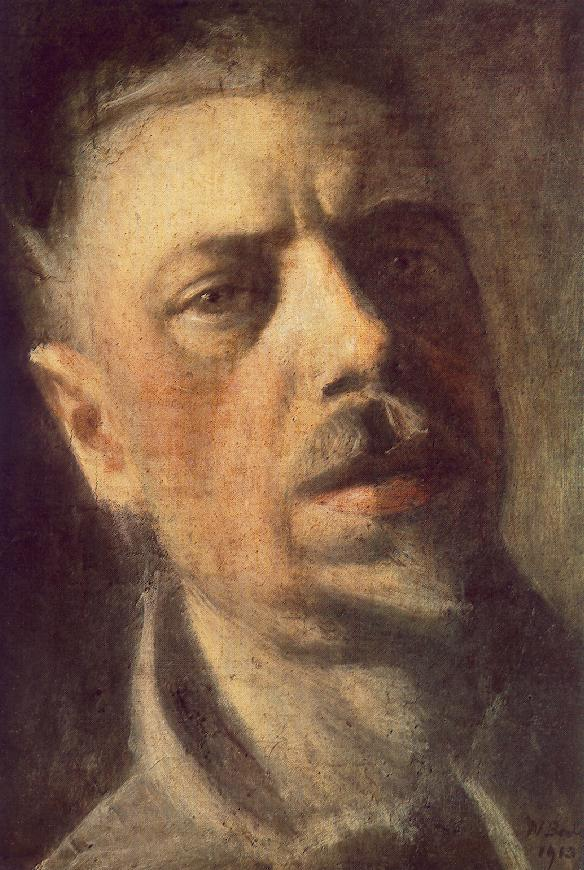
One of his numerous self-portraits (1913)

János Nagy Balogh (2 August 1874, Budapest – 22 November 1919, Budapest) was a Hungarian painter and graphic artist who specialized in proletarian subjects.

== Biography ==
He came from a humble, working-class family. His father died early and his mother had to support the family doing laundry, so he spent much of his youth in poverty. Later, he was apprenticed to a Master Painter whose drunken, abusive behavior made him seek a way to escape, so he began saving his money with the goal of becoming an artist.

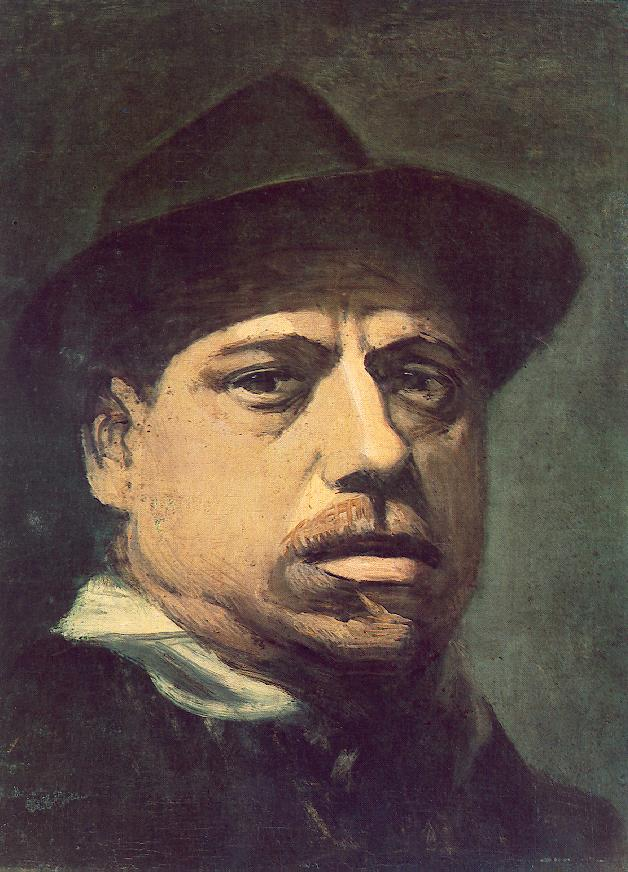
Self-portrait with his hat (date unknown)

Originally, he enrolled at the "School of Fine and Applied Arts", where he attended night classes while supporting himself by house-painting. In 1899, he was able to spend a few months in Munich, attending classes taught by Ludwig von Herterich at the Academy of Fine Arts, but his financial necessities continued to prevent him from attending daytime classes so he ended up being essentially self-taught and able to paint only in his spare time.

At first, he developed his style by painting still lifes, self-portraits and portraits of his mother, engaged in household chores. Then, perhaps under the influence of Jean-François Millet, he decided to focus on painting the workers he knew so well from his youth. For many years, he remained reluctant to show his works in public or part with them. What little money he earned from working went mostly to painting supplies. He eventually became a local "character", who was readily recognizable by the very old, floppy hat he always wore.

In 1915, he joined the Army and received a wound that resulted in his right arm being paralyzed, but he continued to work as best he could with his left hand. One day, his neighbors heard a loud crash and rushed to his apartment, where they found him lying on his back, clutching his brush. He was taken to the hospital, but died shortly after arriving there. His friend, the art critic and writer, Jenő Bálint, arranged for a quick, private (and apparently somewhat secret) burial at the New Public Cemetery. Within ten years, his neglected grave had disappeared.

Due to the political unrest at the time, his first exhibition wasn't staged until 1922 at the Museum of Fine Arts. After 1945, when the Communist government took power and social realism in the arts was being promoted, his paintings gained official approbation. In 1959, on the anniversary of his death, a major exhibition was held at the Hungarian National Gallery. A commemorative stamp with one of his self-portraits was issued in 1969 and a statue in his honor (showing him in his trademark hat), by István Martsa, was created in 1975 and placed in Kós Károly Park.

== Other selected paintings ==
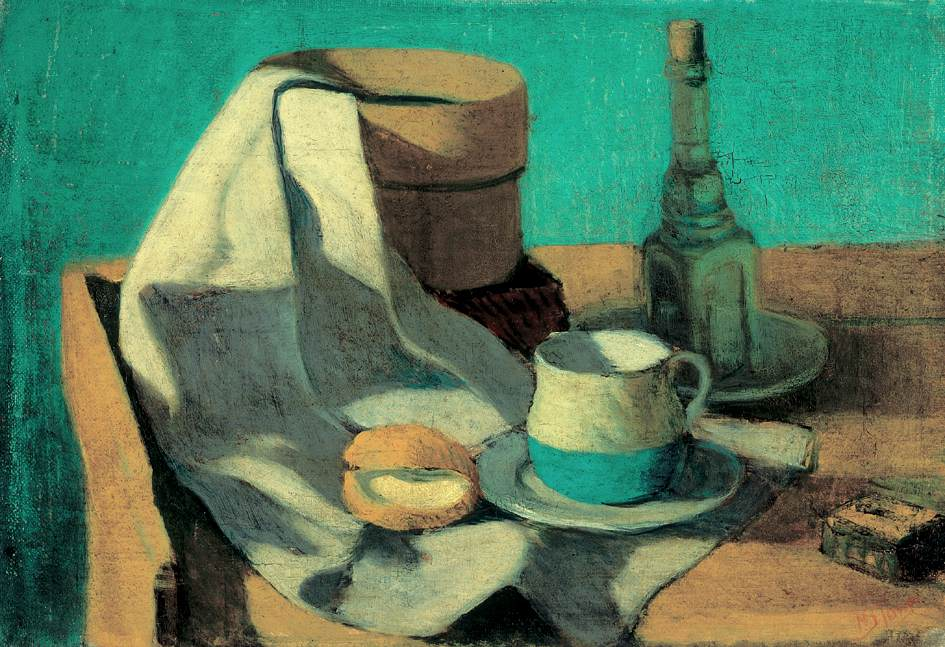
Still Life with Sieve, Bun and Mug (date unknown)

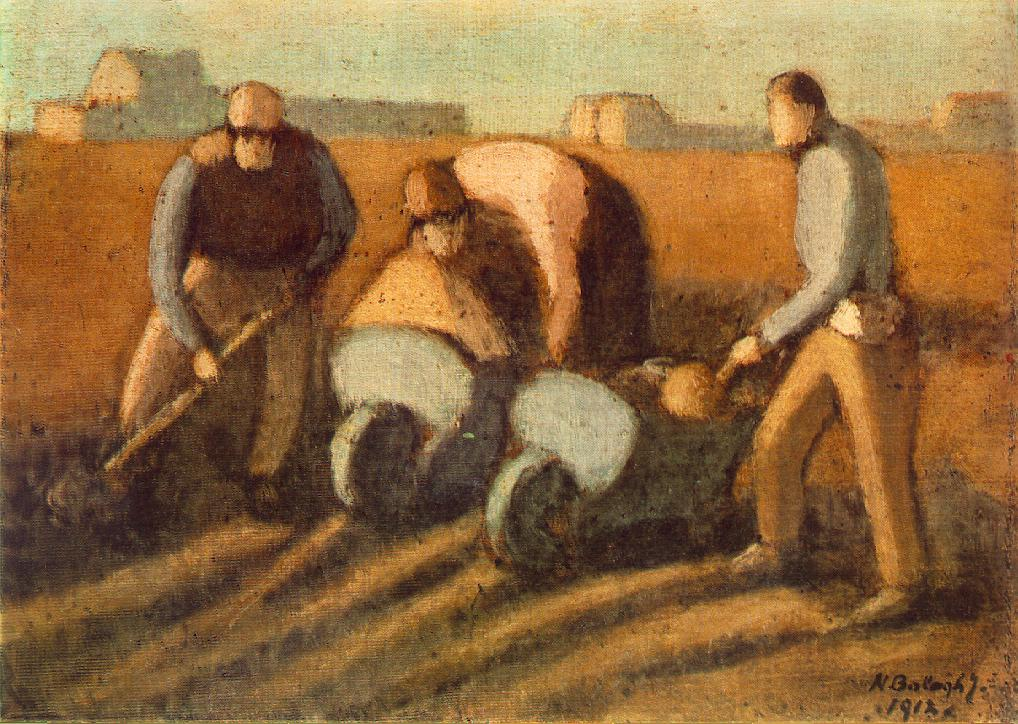
Navvies with Wheelbarrows (1912)

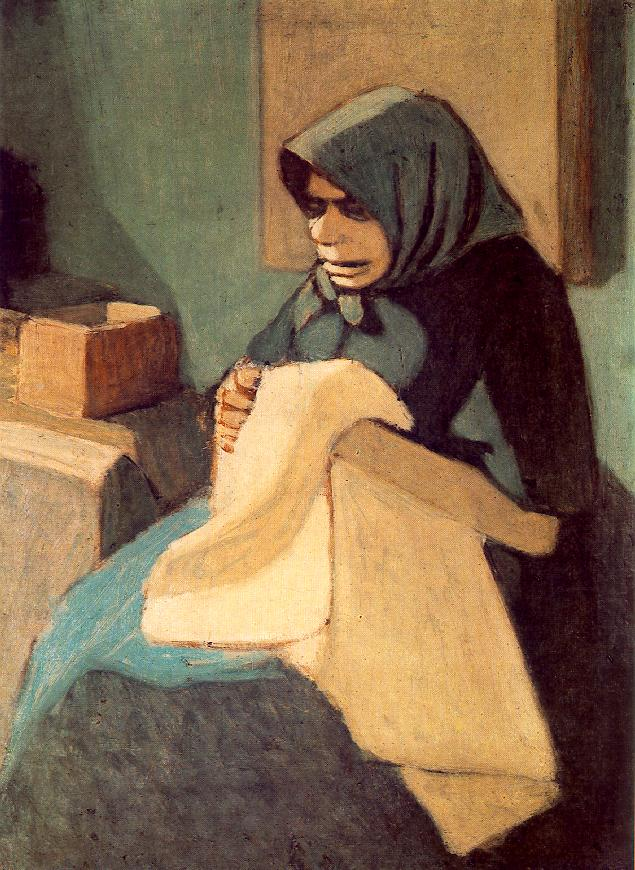
The Artist's Mother (c.1910)

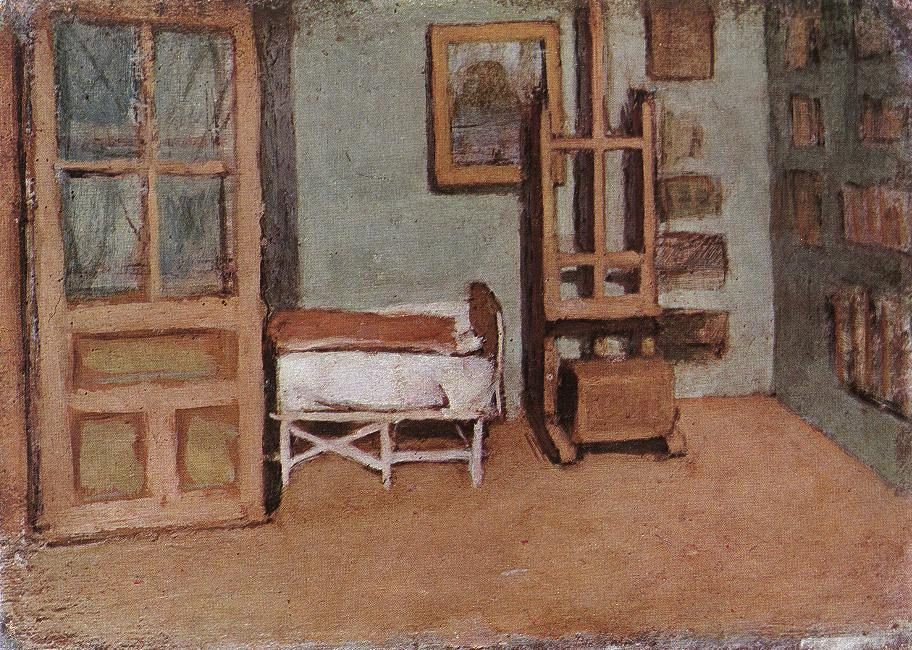
The Artist's Studio (c.1912)
