= Paul Buser =

Swiss sport shooter

Personal information
- Born: 26 July 1934 (age 91)

Sport
- Sport: Sports shooting

Paul Buser (born 26 July 1934) is a Swiss former sports shooter. He competed at the 1972 Summer Olympics and the 1976 Summer Olympics.
