= József Balogh (politician) =

Hungarian politician

Member of the National Assembly
- In office 18 June 1998 – 5 May 2014

Personal details
- Born: 12 December 1962 (age 63) Kecskemét, Hungary
- Party: FKGP (1989–2002); Fidesz (2003–2013)
- Children: 6
- Profession: politician

József Balogh (born 12 December 1962) is a Hungarian politician, member of the National Assembly (MP) for Kunszentmiklós, Bács-Kiskun County between 1998 and 2014.

== Career ==
He received vocational qualifications as an agricultural machines mechanic at Industrial Skilled Workers' Training Institute No. 607 of Kecskemét in 1980. He worked for Zrínyi Miklós Agricultural Cooperative at Fülöpháza until 1985. He was employed by the Municipal Council of Fülöpháza until 1990. Currently he has a farm of his own near Fülöpháza.

He is a member of the Parliamentary Committee on Agriculture since 2002. He was a member of the Independent Smallholders, Agrarian Workers and Civic Party (FKGP) between 1989 and 2002. He joined Fidesz in 2003. He served as the mayor of Fülöpháza between 2010 and 2016. Balogh was succeeded by his daughter Csilla Nagy-Balogh in the mayoral seat. He was elected to the local representative body of Fülöpháza in the 2019 local elections.

== Criminal charge ==
On 29 April 2013 the newly-founded 444.hu news site reported that Balogh struck his common law partner repeatedly in the face with his fist while drunk on the weekend, according to his wife, who said after she was taken to hospital. Népszabadság also wrote that his partner had been treated for similar injuries in the past, saying on those occasions that she had fallen off a ladder or fallen in the courtyard. Balogh said he will waive his parliamentarian's immunity, if it becomes necessary. He also told that "he does not remember beating his girlfriend. They returned home from a wedding reception, he was drunk and his partner may have fallen over the family's dog."

According to Heti Világgazdaság Balogh was also beating constantly his previous wife over twenty-five years. The woman said to the reporter of the RTL Klub that she divorced from her husband because of his "rudeness and aggressiveness". She also told that will send the documents on Balogh's harassment to PM Viktor Orbán before the 2014 parliamentary election.

Socialist board member Ildikó Bangó-Borbély said the governing party should call on Balogh to resign immediately. Fidesz party spokeswoman Gabriella Selmeczi said Fidesz will wait for the outcome of the prosecutors inquiry to see what happened exactly, but she also added that "who commits such a thing, he has no place in public life. On 2 May 2013 Balogh announced he quit from the party's parliamentary group and will continue to work as an independent MP.

On 4 November 2013 Balogh has admitted to prosecutors that "he drunk and assaulted his partner by punching her in the face, grabbing her hair and slamming her head against wooden terrace railings." The woman's nose was broken and suffered multiple cheekbone fractures and other injuries. As a result, Balogh was expelled from the Fidesz on 6 November 2013. According to the party it is deemed unacceptable and intolerable if someone insulted his loved ones.

After receiving suspended prison sentence, Balogh immediately resigned from his mayoral seat on 22 June 2016.

== Personal life ==
He is married and has six children - five own and one adopted.
