= László Orbán (sport shooter) =

Hungarian sports shooter (born 1960)

Personal information
- Nationality: Hungarian
- Born: 23 July 1960 (age 64); Budapest, Hungary

Sport
- Sport: Sports shooting

László Orbán (born 23 July 1960) is a Hungarian sports shooter. He competed in the mixed 25 metre rapid fire pistol event at the 1980 Summer Olympics.
