= Jindřich Skupa =

Czech sport shooter

Personal information
- Nationality: Czech
- Born: 25 July 1962 (age 63) Brno, Czechoslovakia

Sport
- Sport: Sport shooting

Jindřich Skupa (born 25 July 1962) is a Czech sport shooter. He competed in the men's 25 metre rapid fire pistol event at the 1992 Summer Olympics.
