= Giovanni Liverzani =

Italian sport shooter

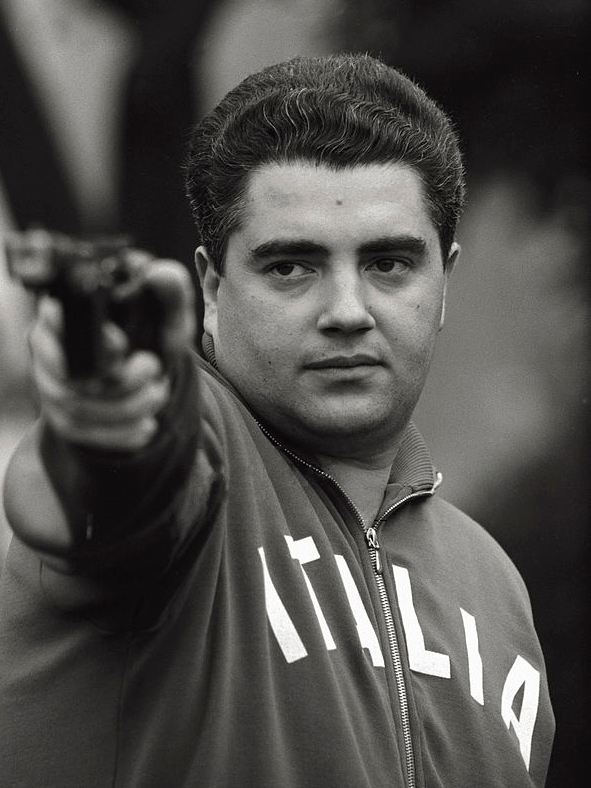
- Giovanni Liverzani at the 1964 Olympics

Personal information
- Born: 5 May 1933 Vicenza, Italy
- Died: 4 July 2013 (aged 80)
- Height: 1.82 m (6 ft 0 in)
- Weight: 88 kg (194 lb)

Sport
- Sport: Pistol shooting
- Club: Tiro a Segno Nazionale, Milan
Medal record
Representing Italy
World Championships
Bronze medal – third place	1962 Cairo	25 m rapid fire, team
Gold medal – first place	1970 Phoenix	25 m rapid fire, individual
Gold medal – first place	1970 Phoenix	25 m rapid fire, team

Giovanni Liverzani (5 May 1933 – 4 July 2013) was an Italian pistol shooter. He competed in the 25 m rapid-fire pistol event at the 1964, 1968 and 1972 Olympics with the best achievement of sixth place in 1972. At the world championships Liverzani won a team bronze in 1962 and both individual and team gold medals in 1970, setting a world record. He retired in 1974.
