= Dirk Köhler =

German sports shooter

Dirk Köhler (18 March 1968 – 30 May 1994) was a German sport shooter who competed in the 1988 Summer Olympics. He was born in Karlsruhe.
