= Corneliu Ion =

Romanian sport shooter (born 1951)

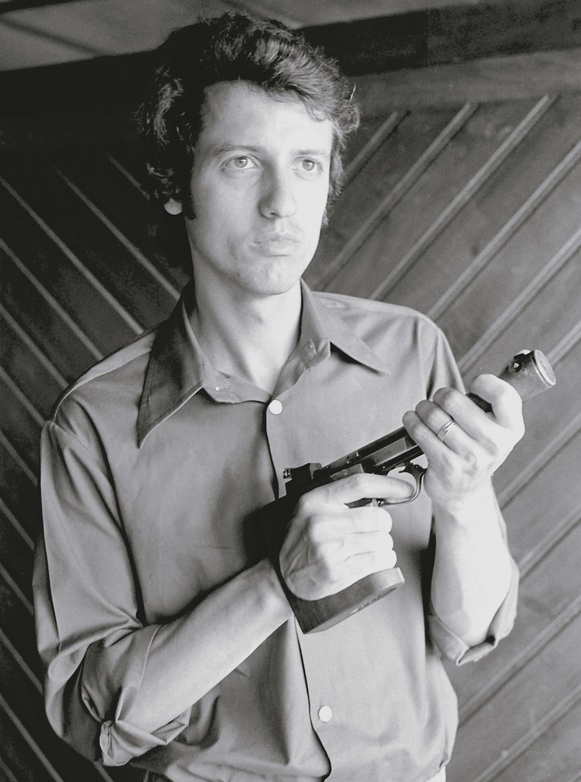

Personal information
- Born: 27 June 1951 (age 75) Focșani, Romania
- Height: 182 cm (6 ft 0 in)
- Weight: 70 kg (154 lb)

Sport
- Sport: Pistol shooting
- Event(s): 25 meter rapid fire pistol 10 m air pistol
- Club: CSA Steaua București
- Coached by: Gheorghe Corbescu
Medal record
Representing Romania
Olympic Games
Gold medal – first place	1980 Moscow	Rapid 25 m ind.
Silver medal – second place	1984 Los Angeles	Rapid 25 m ind.
World Championships
Silver medal – second place	1974 Thun	Air 10 m ind.
Bronze medal – third place	1974 Thun	Rapid 25 m team
Silver medal – second place	1982 Caracas	Rapid 25 m team

Corneliu Ion (born 27 June 1951) is a Romanian retired shooter who specialized in the 25 meter rapid fire pistol event. He competed at the 1976, 1980, 1984 and 1988 Olympics and won a gold medal in 1980 and a silver in 1984, placing fifth in 1976. In 1984 he served as the flag bearer for Romania at the opening ceremony. In 1975 he set a team world record at 2370 points and in 1977 equaled the individual world record at 598 points.

Ion graduated from the Bucharest Academy of Economic Studies and from the International School of Shooting Trainers in Wiesbaden in 1989. He took up shooting in 1969 at CSA Steaua București and later worked as a coach there for 12 years, becoming head of the shooting section in 1989. His trainees include Iulian Raicea and Sorin Babii. In parallel, between 1990 and 2001 he served as president of the Romanian Shooting Federation. He was also a member of the Romanian Olympic Committee.
