= Väinö Heusala =

Finnish sports shooter

Personal information
- Full name: Väinö Jalmar Heusala
- Born: 16 May 1914 Kalajoki, Finland
- Died: 17 May 1982 (aged 68) Helsinki, Finland

Sport
- Sport: Sports shooting

Väinö Jalmar Heusala (16 May 1914 – 17 May 1982) was a Finnish sports shooter. He competed in the 25 m pistol event at the 1948 Summer Olympics.
