= Gerhard Petritsch =

Austrian sport shooter (born 1940)

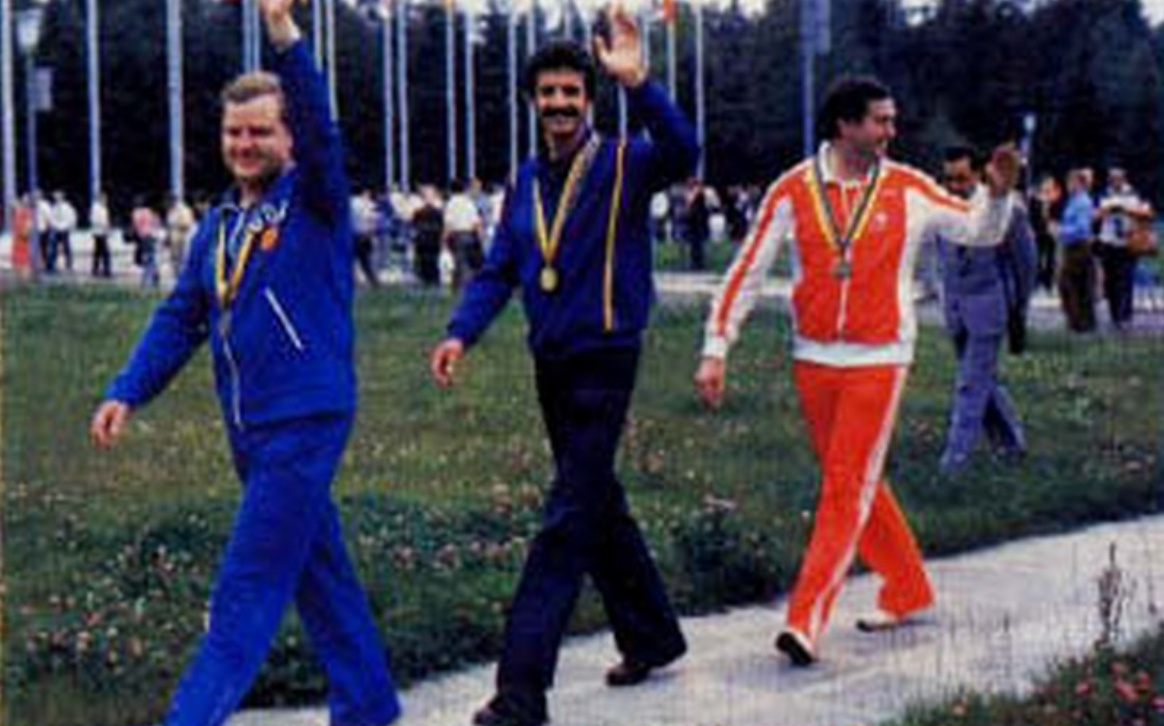
- Gerhard Petritsch (right) at the 1980 Summer Olympics

Personal information
- Born: 2 September 1940 (age 85) Berchtesgaden, Germany

Sport
- Sport: Sports shooting
Medal record
Men's shooting
Representing Austria
Olympic Games
Bronze medal – third place	1980 Moscow	rapid fire pistol

Gerhard Petritsch (born 2 September 1940) is an Austrian former sport shooter who competed in the 1972 Summer Olympics, in the 1976 Summer Olympics, in the 1980 Summer Olympics and in the 1984 Summer Olympics. He won a bronze medal at the 1980 Summer Olympics.
