= Jaime González (sport shooter) =

Spanish sports shooter

Personal information
- Born: 11 August 1933 A Coruña, Spain
- Died: 28 November 2011 (aged 78)

Sport
- Sport: Sports shooting

Jaime González (11 August 1933 – 28 November 2011) was a Spanish sports shooter. He competed for Spain at four Olympic Games between 1968 and 1980.
