= Werner Beier =

German sports shooter

Personal information
- Nationality: German
- Born: 25 April 1936 (age 88); Frankfurt, Germany

Sport
- Sport: Sports shooting

Werner Beier (born 25 April 1936) is a German sports shooter. He competed in the men's 25 metre rapid fire pistol event at the 1976 Summer Olympics.
