= Kārlis Kļava =

Latvian military officer and sports shooter

Personal information
- Born: 9 March 1907 Zvārde parish, Latvia
- Died: 24 August 1943 (aged 36) Norillag prison camp, Krasnoyarsk Krai, Russia

Sport
- Sport: Sports shooting
- Club: ASK

Kārlis Kļava (9 March 1907 – 24 August 1943) was a Latvian military officer and sports shooter. He placed 23rd in the 25 m rapid fire pistol event at the 1936 Summer Olympics. Next year he won that event at the 1937 World Championships, becoming the first Latvian athlete to win a world title, and was selected as Latvian Sportspersonality of the year.

After graduating from the Liepāja State Technical College in 1928, Kļava served in the Latvian army. In 1931, he graduated from the Latvian War School, and from 1932 to 1940 he was a lieutenant of the Riga Infantry Regiment. In parallel with his military career, in the late 1930s he studied engineering at the Faculty of Mechanics of the University of Latvia. Kļava was arrested by the NKVD and died in 1943 in a Soviet prison camp.
