= Norbert Klaar =

German sport shooter

Personal information
- Born: 12 October 1954 (age 71) Wittenberge, East Germany
- Height: 184 cm (6 ft 0 in)
- Weight: 83 kg (183 lb)

Sport
- Sport: Shooting
- Club: SC Dynamo Hoppegarten
Medal record
Men's shooting
Representing East Germany
Olympic Games
Gold medal – first place	1976 Montreal	25 m rapid fire pistol

Norbert Klaar (born 12 October 1954) is a German sports shooter and Olympic champion. He won gold medal in the 25 metre rapid fire pistol at the 1976 Summer Olympics in Montreal.
