= Vladimír Hyka =

Czech sport shooter

Personal information
- Nationality: Czech
- Born: 29 May 1952 (age 73) Česká Lípa, Czechoslovakia

Sport
- Sport: Sport shooting

Vladimír Hyka (born 29 May 1952) is a Czech former sport shooter. He competed in the men's 25 metre rapid fire pistol event at the 1976 Summer Olympics.
