= Roberto Ferraris =

Italian sport shooter

Personal information
- Born: 16 January 1952 (age 74) Naples, Italy

Sport
- Sport: Sports shooting
Medal record
Men's shooting
Representing Italy
Olympic Games
Bronze medal – third place	1976 Montreal	rapid fire pistol

Roberto Ferraris (born 16 January 1952) is an Italian former sport shooter who competed in the 1972 Summer Olympics, in the 1976 Summer Olympics and in the 1980 Summer Olympics. At the 1976 Summer Olympics he won a bronze medal in the rapid fire pistol event.
