= László Balogh (painter) =

Hungarian painter (1930–2023)

László Balogh (12 January 1930 – 11 June 2023) was a Hungarian painter from Szentendre. Since 1956, his works have been shown both in Hungary and abroad, and his paintings can be found in private and public collections in Hungary, Germany, the United States, Switzerland, France, Austria, Sweden, Finland and Spain.

Balogh died on 11 June 2023, at the age of 93.

== Sources ==
- Hungarian Museums homepage
