= Franc Peternel =

Slovenian sports shooter (1932–2015)

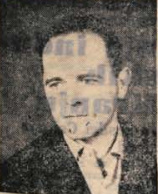
- Franc Peternel in 1969

Personal information
- Nationality: Slovenian
- Born: 9 November 1932 Kranj, Yugoslavia
- Died: 2015 (aged 82–83)

Sport
- Sport: Sports shooting

Franc Peternel (9 November 1932 – 2015) was a Slovenian sports shooter. He competed at the 1976 Summer Olympics and the 1980 Summer Olympics. Peternel died in 2015.
