= Andrzej Macur =

Polish sports shooter

Personal information
- Nationality: Polish
- Born: 1 February 1959 (age 66); Zielona Góra, Poland

Sport
- Sport: Sports shooting

Andrzej Macur (born 1 February 1959) is a Polish sports shooter. He competed in the mixed 25 metre rapid fire pistol event at the 1980 Summer Olympics.
