= Alberto Sevieri =

Italian sports shooter (born 1945)

Alberto Sevieri (born 14 April 1945) is an Italian former sport shooter who competed in the 1988 Summer Olympics. Sevieri competed in the 1988 Summer Olympics in Seoul and placed 4th in the Men's 25m Rapid Fire Pistol.
