= Toni Küchler =

Swiss sports shooter

Personal information
- Nationality: Swiss
- Born: 20 February 1960 (age 65) Sarnen, Switzerland

Sport
- Sport: Sports shooting

Toni Küchler (born 20 February 1960) is a Swiss sports shooter. He competed at the 1988 Summer Olympics and the 1992 Summer Olympics.
