= Petri Eteläniemi =

Finnish sports shooter

Personal information
- Nationality: Finnish
- Born: 2 April 1968 (age 56); Pori, Finland

Sport
- Sport: Sports shooting

Petri Eteläniemi (born 2 April 1968) is a Finnish sports shooter. He competed at the 1992 Summer Olympics and the 1996 Summer Olympics.
