= Jürgen Wiefel =

German sport shooter

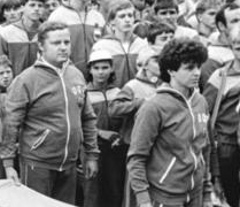
- Jürgen Wiefel (left) in 1985

Medal record

Shooting

Representing East Germany
Silver medal – second place	1976 Montreal	rapid fire pistol
Silver medal – second place	1980 Moskva	rapid fire pistol

Jürgen Wiefel (born 10 March 1952 in Leipzig) is a German former sport shooter who competed in the 1976 Summer Olympics and in the 1980 Summer Olympics.
