= Zoltán Balog (astronomer) =

Hungarian astronomer

Zoltán Balog (born on October 10, 1972, in Szolnok, Hungary) is an astronomer with the Max Planck Institute for Astronomy in Heidelberg, Germany. In 2006, while at the Steward Observatory at the University of Arizona, Balog's team was the first to observe the complete process of photoevaporation of a protoplanetary disk.

== Observations ==
Balog's team was the first to observe protoplanetary disk photoevaporation and the resulting dust tail using NASA's Spitzer Space Telescope. The resulting paper was published in Astrophysical Journal. Balog's collaborators and co-authors are astronomers James Muzerolle, Erick T. Young, George Rieke and Kate Su, all of the University of Arizona at Tucson. Balog is a member of the Multiband Imaging Photometer for Spitzer (MIPS) Guaranteed Time Observations (GTO) team led by George Rieke.

== Publications ==
Balog earned his PhD in Physics in 2005 from the University of Szeged, Hungary. He was also a Smithsonian Astrophysical Observatory pre-doctoral fellow between 1999 and 2002 at the Center for Astrophysics | Harvard & Smithsonian.
