= Hans-Rudolf Schneider =

Swiss sports shooter

Personal information
- Nationality: Swiss
- Born: 3 February 1956 (age 69)

Sport
- Sport: Sports shooting

Hans-Rudolf Schneider (born 3 February 1956) is a Swiss sports shooter. He competed at the 1988 Summer Olympics and the 1992 Summer Olympics.
