= Adam Kaczmarek =

Polish sports shooter (1961–2024)

Medal record

Men's sport shooting

Representing Poland

World Championships
Gold medal – first place	1986 Suhl	25 m Rapid fire pistol
Gold medal – first place	1994 Milan	25 m Rapid fire pistol (team)

European Championships
Bronze medal – third place	1985 Osijek	25 m Rapid fire pistol
Bronze medal – third place	1987 Lahti	25 m Rapid fire pistol (team)
Silver medal – second place	1989 Zagreb	25 m Rapid fire pistol (team)
Gold medal – first place	1991 Bologna	25 m Rapid fire pistol (team)
Bronze medal – third place	1991 Bologna	25 m Rapid fire pistol

Adam Stanisław Kaczmarek (17 October 1961 – 5 June 2024) was a Polish sport shooter who competed in the 1988 Summer Olympics and in the 1992 Summer Olympics. He died on 5 June 2024, at the age of 62.
