= Ove Gunnarsson =

Swedish sports shooter

Personal information
- Nationality: Swedish
- Born: 22 January 1946; Nordmaling, Sweden
- Died: 30 May 1994 (aged 48); Storvreta, Sweden

Sport
- Sport: Sports shooting

Ove Gunnarsson (22 January 1946 – 30 May 1994) was a Swedish sports shooter. He competed at the 1976, 1980 and the 1984 Summer Olympics.
