= Marin Stan =

Romanian sports shooter

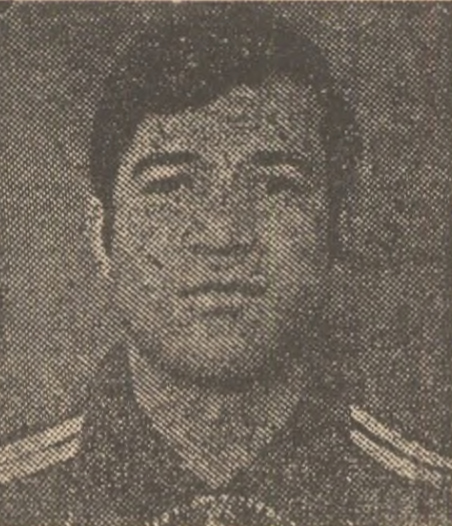

Personal information
- Nationality: Romanian
- Born: 9 July 1950 (age 75) Alexandria, Romania

Sport
- Sport: Sports shooting

Marin Stan (born 9 July 1950) is a Romanian sports shooter. He competed at the 1976 Summer Olympics, the 1980 Summer Olympics and the 1984 Summer Olympics.
