= László Balogh (sport shooter) =

Hungarian sports shooter (1958–2019)

László Balogh (9 September 1958 – April 2019) was a Hungarian sport shooter who competed in the 1988 Summer Olympics.
