= Juan Seguí =

Spanish sport shooter

Juan Seguí (born 21 July 1947) is a Spanish former sport shooter who competed in the 1976 Summer Olympics, in the 1980 Summer Olympics, in the 1984 Summer Olympics, in the 1988 Summer Olympics, in the 1992 Summer Olympics.
