= List of flag bearers for Vietnam at the Olympics =

Vietnam at the Olympics
- IOC code: VIE
- NOC: Vietnam Olympic Committee
- Website: www.voc.org.vn (in Vietnamese and English)
- Medals: Gold 1 Silver 3 Bronze 1 Total 5

Summer appearances
- 1952; 1956; 1960; 1964; 1968; 1972; 1976; 1980; 1984; 1988; 1992; 1996; 2000; 2004; 2008; 2012; 2016; 2020; 2024

This is a list of flag bearers who have represented Vietnam at the Olympics.

Flag bearers carry the national flag of their country at the opening ceremony of the Olympic Games.

Games	Participated as	Flag bearer(s)	Sport
1952 Helsinki	Vietnam	No information	
1956 Melbourne	Vietnam	No information	
1960 Rome	Vietnam	No information	
1964 Tokyo	Vietnam	No information	
1968 Mexico City	Vietnam	No information	
1972 Munich	Vietnam	Hồ Minh Thu	Shooting
1976 Montreal	Did not participate		
1980 Moscow	Vietnam	Phan Huy Khảng	Shooting
1984 Los Angeles	Did not participate		
1988 Seoul	Vietnam	Nguyễn Đình Minh	Athletics
1992 Barcelona	Vietnam	No information	
1996 Atlanta	Vietnam	Nguyễn Hữu Huy	Judo
2000 Sydney	Vietnam	Trương Ngọc Để	Taekwondo
2004 Athens	Vietnam	Bùi Thị Nhung	Athletics
2008 Beijing	Vietnam	Nguyễn Đình Cương	Athletics
2012 London	Vietnam	Nguyễn Tiến Nhật	Fencing
2016 Rio de Janeiro	Vietnam	Vũ Thành An	Fencing
2020 Tokyo	Vietnam	Quách Thị Lan	Athletics
2020 Tokyo	Vietnam	Nguyễn Huy Hoàng	Swimming
2024 Paris	Vietnam	Lê Đức Phát	Badminton
2024 Paris	Vietnam	Nguyễn Thị Thật	Cycling
2028 Los Angeles	Future event		
2032 Brisbane	Future event		

== See also ==
- Vietnam at the Olympics
