= Vietnam at the 2028 Summer Olympics =

- IOC code: VIE
- NOC: Vietnam Olympic Committee
- Website: www.voc.org.vn (in English)

in Los Angeles, United States 14 July 2028 – 30 July 2028
- Competitors: 1 in 1 sport
- Medals: Gold 0 Silver 0 Bronze 0 Total 0

Summer Olympics appearances (overview)
- 1952; 1956; 1960; 1964; 1968; 1972; 1976; 1980; 1984; 1988; 1992; 1996; 2000; 2004; 2008; 2012; 2016; 2020; 2024; 2028

Vietnam is scheduled to compete at the 2028 Summer Olympics in Los Angeles, United States, from 14 to 30 July 2028. It will be the nation's twelth appearance at the Olympics as a reunified republic, although the Vietnamese athletes previously attended six other editions under the banner of the State of Vietnam or South Vietnam, except on two occasions: in 1976, as the result of an impact areas in the nation's warzones during the Vietnam War, and in 1984 due to the nation's support for the Soviet-led boycott.

== Competitors ==
The following is the list of number of competitors in the Games.

Sport	Men	Women	Total
Shooting	0	1	1
Total	0	1	1

== Shooting ==
Vietnam secured its first quota place in shooting for the 2028 Summer Olympics through Trịnh Thu Vinh, who won the silver medal in the women's 25 metre pistol event at the 2026 ISSF World Shooting Championships in Doha, Qatar, on 10 November 2026.

Women

Athlete	Event	Qualification		Final	
Athlete	Event	Points	Rank	Points	Rank
Trịnh Thu Vinh	25 metre pistol				
