= Vietnam at the 1980 Summer Olympics =

- IOC code: VIE
- NOC: Vietnam Olympic Committee

in Moscow
- Competitors: 35 in 4 sports
- Flag bearer: Nguyễn Mạnh Tuấn
- Medals: Gold 0 Silver 0 Bronze 0 Total 0

Summer Olympics appearances (overview)
- 1952; 1956; 1960; 1964; 1968; 1972; 1976; 1980; 1984; 1988; 1992; 1996; 2000; 2004; 2008; 2012; 2016; 2020; 2024; 2028

Vietnam competed at the 1980 Summer Olympics in Moscow, USSR. This was the first participation in the Olympics by the nation following the end of the Vietnam War and the Reunification of Vietnam.

== Results by event ==
=== Athletics ===
Men's 1,500 metres

- Lê Quang Khải

- Heat — 4:06.8 (→ did not advance)

Men's Marathon

- Nguyễn Quyễn

- Final — 2:44:37 (→ 50th place)

Men's Triple Jump

- Dương Đức Thủy

- Qualification — 14.59 m (→ did not advance)

Women's 1,500 metres

- Trịnh Thị Bé

- Heat — 4:38.6 (→ did not advance)

Women's 100 metres

- Trần Thanh Vân

- Heat — 13.23 (→ did not advance)

Women's 200 metres

- Trần Thị Ngọc Anh

- Heat — 26.83 (→ did not advance)

Women's 400 metres

- Trần Thị Ngọc Anh

- Heat — 1:00.62 (→ did not advance)

Women's Long Jump

- Nguyễn Thị Hoàng Na

- Qualifying Round — 5.35 m (→ did not advance, 19th place)

=== Shooting ===
Open

Athlete	Event	Final	
Athlete	Event	Score	Rank
Nguyễn Đức Uýnh	25 m rapid fire pistol	583	26
Nguyễn Quốc Cường	25 m rapid fire pistol	585	23
Ngô Hữu Kính	50 m pistol	548	22
Phan Huy Khảng	50 m pistol	550	20
Nguyễn Tiến Trung	50 m rifle prone	583	29
Nguyễn Tiến Trung	50 m rifle three positions	1122	24
Lê Minh Hiển	50 m rifle prone	588	44
Nghiêm Văn Sẩn	50 m rifle three positions	1094	35

=== Swimming ===
Men's 100m Freestyle

- Tô Văn Vệ

- Heats — 56.75 (→ did not advance)

Men's 200m Freestyle

- Tô Văn Vệ

- Heats — 2:11.51 (→ did not advance)

Men's 100 m Backstroke

- Lâm Văn Hoành

- Heats — 1:07.29 (→ did not advance)

Men's 200 m Backstroke

- Phạm Ngọc Tánh

- Heats — 2:28.40 (→ did not advance)

Men's 100 m Breaststroke

- Nguyễn Mạnh Tuấn

- Heats — 1:10.07 (→ did not advance)

Men's 200 m Breaststroke

- Trần Dương Tài

- Heats — 2:38.52 (→ did not advance)

Men's 100 m Butterfly

- Nguyễn Ðăng Bình

- Heats — 1:00.74

Men's 200 m Butterfly

- Trương Ngọc Tơn

- Heats — 2:23.58

Women's 100 m Freestyle

- Chung Thị Thanh Lan

- Heats — 1:12.27

Women's 100 m Backstroke

Nguyễn Thị Hồng Bích
- Heats — 1:20.34

Women's 200 m Backstroke

Nguyễn Thị Hồng Bích
- Heats — 2:52.90

Women's 100 m Breaststroke

- Phạm Thị Phú

- Heats — 1:22.73 (→ did not advance)

Women's 200 m Breaststroke

- Hoàng Thị Hoà

- Heats — 2:55.94 (→ did not advance)

=== Wrestling ===
Men's freestyle

Legend

- TF — Won by Fall
- IN — Won by Opponent Injury
- DQ — Won by Passivity
- D1 — Won by Passivity, the winner is passive too
- D2 — Both wrestlers lost by Passivity
- FF — Won by Forfeit
- DNA — Did not appear
- TPP — Total penalty points
- MPP — Match penalty points

Athlete	Event	Elimination Pool						Final round		Reference
Athlete	Event	Round 1 Result	Round 2 Result	Round 3 Result	Round 4 Result	Round 5 Result	Round 6 Result	Final round Result	Rank	Reference
Nguyễn Văn Công	−48 kg	László Biró (HUN); L 2-13	Mahabir Singh (IND); L 2-14	—N/a				Did not advance		
Nguyễn Kim Thiềng	−52 kg	Mohamed Hachaichi (ALG); L 8-15	Mohammad Aynutdin (AFG); L 2-18	—N/a				Did not advance		
Phạm Văn Tý	−57 kg	Juan Rodríguez (CUB); L 1-29	Karim Salman Muhsin (IRQ); L 2-17	—N/a				Did not advance		
Phí Hữu Tình	−62 kg	Victor Kede Manga (CMR); W 15-0	Zoltán Szalontai (HUN); L 1-14	Georges Hadjiioannidis (GRE); L 0-25	—N/a			Did not advance		
Nguyễn Ðình Chi	−68 kg	János Kocsis (HUN); L TF	Jagmander Singh (IND); L TF	—N/a				Did not advance		
