= Lajos Nagy =

Louis I of Hungary (1326–1382) was King of Hungary and Croatia from 1342 and King of Poland from 1370.

Lajos Nagy may refer to:

- Lajos Nagy (writer) (1883-1954), Hungarian writer
- Lajos Nagy (footballer) (born 1975), Hungarian footballer
- Lajos Nagy (rower) (born 1924), Hungarian rower
- Lajos Nagy (sport shooter) (born 1945), Hungarian sports shooter
- Lajos Nagy (water polo) (born 1936), German Olympic water polo player
- Lajos Parti Nagy (born 1953), Hungarian poet, playwright and writer
- Lou Nagy (born 1960 as Lajos Nagy), Canadian football player
