= Vietnam at the 1964 Summer Olympics =

- IOC code: VIE (VET used at these Games)
- NOC: Vietnam Olympic Committee

in Tokyo
- Competitors: 16 in 5 sports
- Medals: Gold 0 Silver 0 Bronze 0 Total 0

Summer Olympics appearances (overview)
- 1952; 1956; 1960; 1964; 1968; 1972; 1976; 1980; 1984; 1988; 1992; 1996; 2000; 2004; 2008; 2012; 2016; 2020; 2024

The Republic of Vietnam competed as Vietnam at the 1964 Summer Olympics in Tokyo, Japan. 16 competitors, all men, took part in 14 events in 5 sports.

== Cycling ==
Six cyclists represented Vietnam in 1964.

Individual road race

- Phạm Văn Sau
- Trần Văn Nen
- Nguyễn Văn Khoi
- Nguyễn Văn Ngan

Team time trial

- Huỳnh Anh
- Nguyễn Văn Khoi
- Nguyễn Văn Ngan
- Trần Văn Nen

Sprint

- Nguyễn Văn Châu

1000m time trial

- Trần Văn Nen

Individual pursuit

- Trần Văn Nen

== Fencing ==
Two fencers represented Vietnam in 1964.

Men's épée

- Trần Văn Xuan

Men's sabre

- Nguyễn The Loc
- Trần Văn Xuan

== Judo ==
Three judoka represented Vietnam in the 1964

Men's Lightweight

- Nguyễn Văn Bình

Men's Middleweight

- Lê Bả Thành
- Thai Thuc Thuan

== Swimming ==
Men

Athlete	Event	Heat		Semifinal		Final	
Athlete	Event	Time	Rank	Time	Rank	Time	Rank
Nguyễn Ðình Lê	100 m freestyle	1:01.1	=62	Did not advance			
Phan Hữu Dong	100 m freestyle	1:01.1	=62	Did not advance			
Huỳnh Văn Hải	200 m breaststroke	2:51.6	32	Did not advance			
