= Vietnam at the 1960 Summer Olympics =

- IOC code: VIE (VNM used at these Games)
- NOC: Vietnam Olympic Committee

in Rome
- Competitors: 3 in 2 sports
- Medals: Gold 0 Silver 0 Bronze 0 Total 0

Summer Olympics appearances (overview)
- 1952; 1956; 1960; 1964; 1968; 1972; 1976; 1980; 1984; 1988; 1992; 1996; 2000; 2004; 2008; 2012; 2016; 2020; 2024

The Republic of Vietnam competed as Vietnam at the 1960 Summer Olympics in Rome, Italy. Three competitors, all men, took part in five events in two sports.

== Fencing ==
One fencer represented Vietnam in 1960.

Men's foil

- Trần Văn Xuan
  Round 1: eliminated in group 8, no victory, 5 losses – 12 hits made, 25 hits received – Rank 7
  3:5 - L to Jean Link (Luxemburg)
  4:5 - L to László Kamuti (Hungary)
  4:5 - L to Brian McCowage (Australia)
  0:5 - L to Heizaburō Ōkawa (Japan)
  4:5 - L to Orvar Lindwall (Sweden)

Men's épée

- Trần Văn Xuan
  Round 1: eliminated in group 2, no victory, 5 losses – 12 hits made, 25 hits received – Rank 6
  1:5 - L to József Sákovics (Hungary)
  2:5 - L to Roger Achten (Belgium)
  2:5 - L to José Ferreira (Portugal)
  2:5 - L to Kaj Czarnecki (Finland)
  1:5 - L to Hans Lagerwall (Sweden)

Men's sabre

- Trần Văn Xuan
  Round 1: eliminated in group 12, 1 victory, 4 losses – 13 hits made, 20 hits received – Rank 5
  1:5 - L to Allan Kwartler (United States)
  1:5 - L to Teodoro Goliardi (Uruguay)
  2:5 - L to Jacques Lefèvre (France)
  4:5 - L to Mitsuyuki Funamizu (Japan)
  4:5 - V against David van Gelder (Israel)

== Swimming ==
Men

Athlete	Event	Heat		Semifinal		Final	
Athlete	Event	Time	Rank	Time	Rank	Time	Rank
Phan Hữu Dong	100 m freestyle	1:01.3	44	Did not advance			
Trương Ke Nhon	200 m breaststroke	2:53.0	32	Did not advance			
