= Vietnam at the 1988 Summer Olympics =

- IOC code: VIE
- NOC: Vietnam Olympic Committee
- Website: www.voc.org.vn (in Vietnamese and English)

in Seoul
- Competitors: 9 (8 men, 1 woman) in 5 sports
- Officials: 3
- Medals: Gold 0 Silver 0 Bronze 0 Total 0

Summer Olympics appearances (overview)
- 1952; 1956; 1960; 1964; 1968; 1972; 1976; 1980; 1984; 1988; 1992; 1996; 2000; 2004; 2008; 2012; 2016; 2020; 2024

Vietnam competed at the 1988 Summer Olympics in Seoul, South Korea. The delegation included fifteen members (nine athletes, three coaches, and three officials) in five sport disciplines: athletics, swimming, wrestling, shooting, and cycling.

== Competitors ==
The following is the list of number of competitors in the Games.

Sport	Men	Women	Total
Athletics	2	0	2
Boxing	2	–	2
Cycling	1	0	1
Shooting	1	0	1
Swimming	1	1	2
Wrestling	1	–	1
Total	8	1	9

== Athletics ==
Men's Marathon

- Nguyễn Văn Thuyết – 3:10.57 (→ 97th place)

== Boxing ==
Men's Light Flyweight (– 48 kg)

- Đặng Hiếu Hiền
  1. First Round – Bye
  2. Second Round – Defeated Antonio Caballero (ESP), RSC-2
  3. Third Round – Lost to Michael Carbajal (USA), RSC-1

== Cycling ==
One male cyclist represented Vietnam in 1988.

Men's road race

- Huỳnh Châu

== Swimming ==
Men's 100m Breaststroke

- Quách Hoài Nam
  1. Heat – 1:10.90 (→ did not advance, 54th place)

Men's 200m Breaststroke

- Quách Hoài Nam
  1. Heat – 2:39.69 (→ did not advance, 50th place)

Women's 100m Butterfly

- Nguyễn Kiều Oanh
  1. Heat – 1:07.96 (→ did not advance, 34th place)

Women's 200m Butterfly

- Nguyễn Kiều Oanh
  1. Heat – 2:33.07 (→ did not advance, 27th place)
