= Nguyễn Đình Minh =

Vietnamese sprinter

Personal information
- Nationality: Vietnamese
- Born: 31 March 1966 (age 60)

Sport
- Sport: Sprinting
- Event: 100 metres

Nguyễn Đình Minh (born 31 March 1966) is a Vietnamese sprinter. He competed in the men's 100 metres and 200 metres at the 1988 Summer Olympics. He later become a coach for athletes including Vũ Thị Hương.

== Career ==
From 1986 to 1994, Mihn won almost every national title over 100 metres at Thống Nhất Stadium. This led him to be strongly associated with the stadium, where most Vietnamese Athletics Championships were held. He held the Vietnamese 100 m national record of 10.5 seconds for several years.

Minh was the flag bearer for Vietnam at the 1988 Summer Olympics Parade of Nations. He finished 7th of 8 in his 100 m heat and 8th in his 200 m heat, failing to advance in both events.

He continued to train and compete for about five years even after he stopped winning national championships. Minh qualified for the 1999 World Championships in Athletics in the 100 m, where he finished 7th in his heat.

While an athlete travelling abroad for competitions, Minh studied foreign languages and was hired as an assistant or interpreter for international courses hosted by the Vietnam Olympic Committee.

== Coaching ==
Minh officially switched from competing to coaching in 2000. He was the head coach of the Vietnamese national youth athletics team in 2001, and he began focusing on sprinters in 2003. Minh was appointed head of athletics in Ho Chi Minh City in 2006, but in 2009 he resigned to focus on coaching.

He is most known for coaching Vũ Thị Hương, who is known as the "queen of athletics" in the country. He led her to her first silver medal at the 2010 Asian Games. At the same time, Minh took responsibility for her shortcomings later in her career and sought out a foreign coach to help her improve further. He noticed that he did not have the technological resources that foreign coaches had, and that his "manual" coaching methods were insufficient to develop world-class talent.
