= Vietnam at the 1968 Summer Olympics =

- IOC code: VIE (VNM used at these Games)
- NOC: Vietnam Olympic Committee

in Mexico City
- Competitors: 9 in 5 sports
- Medals: Gold 0 Silver 0 Bronze 0 Total 0

Summer Olympics appearances (overview)
- 1952; 1956; 1960; 1964; 1968; 1972; 1976; 1980; 1984; 1988; 1992; 1996; 2000; 2004; 2008; 2012; 2016; 2020; 2024; 2028

The Republic of Vietnam competed as Vietnam at the 1968 Summer Olympics in Mexico City, Mexico. Nine competitors, seven men and two women, took part in seven events in five sports.

== Athletics ==
One athlete represented Vietnam in 1968.

Decathlon

- Ho Henh Phươc

== Cycling ==
Two cyclists represented Vietnam in 1968.

Individual road race

- Bùi Văn Hoàng
- Trương Kim Hùng

== Fencing ==
One fencer represented Vietnam in 1968.

Men's sabre

- Nguyễn The Loc

== Shooting ==
Three shooters, all male, represented Vietnam in 1968.

25 m pistol

- Vũ Văn Danh

50 m pistol

- Hồ Minh Thu
- Dương Văn Dan

== Swimming ==
Two swimmers represented Vietnam in 1968.

Women

Athlete	Event	Heat		Semifinal		Final	
Athlete	Event	Time	Rank	Time	Rank	Time	Rank
Nguyễn Minh Tam	100 m freestyle	1:09.5	53	Did not advance			
Nguyễn Thị Mỹ Liên	100 m backstroke	1:19.2	38	Did not advance			
