= Vietnam at the Olympics =

- IOC code: VIE
- NOC: Vietnam Olympic Committee
- Website: www.voc.org.vn (in Vietnamese and English)
- Medals Ranked 98th: Gold 1 Silver 3 Bronze 1 Total 5

Summer appearances
- 1952; 1956; 1960; 1964; 1968; 1972; 1976; 1980; 1984; 1988; 1992; 1996; 2000; 2004; 2008; 2012; 2016; 2020; 2024; 2028

Vietnam first competed in the Olympic Games in 1952 as the State of Vietnam. After the Partition of Vietnam in 1954, only the Republic of Vietnam (successor of the State of Vietnam) competed in the Games, sending athletes to every Summer Olympics between 1956 and 1972. In 2026, Dương Trường Lập competed for short track speed skating, marking Vietnam's first time competing in the Winter Games.

Since the reunification of Vietnam in 1976, they have competed as the Socialist Republic of Vietnam, attending every Olympics from 1980 onwards with the exception of 1984. The present Vietnam Olympic Committee was formed in 1976 and recognized by the International Olympic Committee (IOC) in 1979.

Vietnam won its first medal at the 2000 Summer Games in Sydney, when Trần Hiếu Ngân took home a silver in Taekwondo in the Women's -57 kg category. Vietnam won its first gold medal at the 2016 Games in Rio de Janeiro, when shooter Hoàng Xuân Vinh was victorious in the Men's 10m air pistol event.

With a lack of investment in competing in the Olympics, Vietnam has sent an average of only around 12 athletes per game until Tokyo 2020.

== Medal tables ==
=== Medals by Summer Games ===
Games	Athletes	Gold	Silver	Bronze	Total	Rank
as the State of Vietnam and South Vietnam
1952 Helsinki	8	0	0	0	0	−
1956 Melbourne	6	0	0	0	0	−
1960 Rome	3	0	0	0	0	−
1964 Tokyo	16	0	0	0	0	−
1968 Mexico City	9	0	0	0	0	−
1972 Munich	2	0	0	0	0	−
as Vietnam
1976 Montreal	did not participate					
1980 Moscow	35	0	0	0	0	−
1984 Los Angeles	boycotted					
1988 Seoul	10	0	0	0	0	−
1992 Barcelona	7	0	0	0	0	−
1996 Atlanta	6	0	0	0	0	−
2000 Sydney	7	0	1	0	1	64
2004 Athens	11	0	0	0	0	−
2008 Beijing	13	0	1	0	1	72
2012 London	18	0	0	1	1	79
2016 Rio de Janeiro	23	1	1	0	2	48
2020 Tokyo	18	0	0	0	0	–
2024 Paris	16	0	0	0	0	–
2028 Los Angeles	future event					
2032 Brisbane	future event					
Total		1	3	1	5	98

=== Medals by sport ===
Sport	Gold	Silver	Bronze	Total
Shooting	1	1	0	2
Weightlifting	0	1	1	2
Taekwondo	0	1	0	1
Totals (3 entries)	1	3	1	5

=== Medals by Youth Olympics Summer Games ===
Games	Athletes	Gold	Silver	Bronze	Total
2010 Singapore	13	1	1	2	4
2014 China	13	1	1	2	2
2018 Buenos Aires	13	2	1	0	3
2022	Not held due to COVID-19				
2026 Senegal	10	0	2	0	2
Total		4	5	4	11

== List of Olympic medalists ==
Medal	Name	Games	Sport	Event
Silver	Trần Hiếu Ngân	2000 Sydney	Taekwondo	Women's 57 kg
Silver	Hoàng Anh Tuấn	2008 Beijing	Weightlifting	Men's 56 kg
Bronze	Trần Lê Quốc Toàn	2012 London	Weightlifting	Men's 56 kg
Gold	Hoàng Xuân Vinh	2016 Rio de Janeiro	Shooting	Men's 10 metre air pistol
Silver	Hoàng Xuân Vinh	2016 Rio de Janeiro	Shooting	Men's 50 metre pistol

== See also ==
- List of flag bearers for Vietnam at the Olympics
- Vietnam at the Paralympics
