= Rudolf Seres =

Hungarian sports shooter

Personal information
- Nationality: Hungarian
- Born: 12 August 1945 (age 79); Pest, Hungary

Sport
- Sport: Sports shooting

Rudolf Seres (born 12 August 1945) is a Hungarian sports shooter. He competed in the mixed 50 metre free pistol event at the 1980 Summer Olympics.
