= Lyuben Popov =

Bulgarian sports shooter

Personal information
- Nationality: Bulgarian
- Born: 25 October 1954 (age 70)

Sport
- Sport: Sports shooting

Lyuben Popov (Bulgarian: Любен Попов; born 25 October 1954) is a Bulgarian sports shooter. He competed in the mixed 50 metre free pistol event at the 1980 Summer Olympics.
