= Enrico Rabbachin =

Italian sports shooter (1943–2024)

Personal information
- Nationality: Italian
- Born: 3 May 1943; Vigevano, Italy
- Died: 28 December 2024 (aged 81)

Sport
- Sport: Sports shooting

Enrico Rabbachin (3 May 1943 – 28 December 2024) was an Italian sports shooter. He competed in the mixed 50 metre free pistol event at the 1980 Summer Olympics. Rabbachin died on 28 December 2024, at the age of 81.
