= Vietnam at the 2012 Summer Olympics =

- IOC code: VIE
- NOC: Vietnam Olympic Committee
- Website: voc.org.vn/en-us/home

in London
- Competitors: 18 in 11 sports
- Flag bearer (opening): Nguyễn Tiến Nhật
- Flag bearer (closing): Lê Huỳnh Châu
- Medals Ranked 79th: Gold 0 Silver 0 Bronze 1 Total 1

Summer Olympics appearances (overview)
- 1952; 1956; 1960; 1964; 1968; 1972; 1976; 1980; 1984; 1988; 1992; 1996; 2000; 2004; 2008; 2012; 2016; 2020; 2024

Vietnam competed at the 2012 Summer Olympics in London, from July 27 to August 12, 2012. This was the nation's eighth appearance at the Olympics, having missed the 1984 Summer Olympics in Los Angeles, because of the Soviet boycott.

The Vietnam Olympic Committee (VOC) sent the nation's largest delegation to the Games since 1980. A total of 18 athletes, 6 men and 12 women, competed in 11 sports. For the first time in its Olympic history, Vietnam was represented by more female than male athletes. This was also the youngest delegation in Vietnam's Olympic history, with half under the age of 24, and many of them were expected to reach their peak in time for the 2016 Summer Olympics in Rio de Janeiro. Sixteen athletes competed in their first Olympics, including épée fencer Nguyễn Tiến Nhật, who was the nation's flag bearer at the opening ceremony.

Despite fielding its largest delegation to these games, Vietnam, however, failed to win a single medal. Pistol shooter Hoàng Xuân Vinh and weightlifter Trần Lê Quốc Toàn narrowly missed out on Olympic medals in London, after finishing fourth in their respective sporting events.

In 2020, after the disqualification one athlete in a weightlifting men's 56 kg event, the bronze medal in this event was redistributed to Trần Lê Quốc Toàn.

== Medalists ==
Medal	Name	Sport	Event	Date
Bronze	Trần Lê Quốc Toàn	Weightlifting	Men's 56 kg	29 July

== Competitors ==
Sport	Men	Women	Total
Athletics	0	2	2
Badminton	1	0	1
Fencing	1	0	1
Gymnastics	1	2	3
Judo	0	1	1
Rowing	0	2	2
Shooting	1	1	2
Swimming	0	1	1
Taekwondo	1	1	2
Weightlifting	1	1	2
Wrestling	0	1	1
Total	6	12	18

== Athletics ==
Vietnamese athletes who have so far achieved qualifying standards.

Key

- Note – Ranks given for track events are within the athlete's heat only
- Q = Qualified for the next round
- q = Qualified for the next round as a fastest loser or, in field events, by position without achieving the qualifying target
- NR = National record
- N/A = Round not applicable for the event
- Bye = Athlete not required to compete in round

Women
Track & road events

Athlete	Event	Final	
Athlete	Event	Result	Rank
Nguyễn Thị Thanh Phúc	20 km walk	1:33:36 NR	36

Field events

Athlete	Event	Qualification		Final	
Athlete	Event	Distance	Position	Distance	Position
Dương Thị Việt Anh	High jump	1.80	=29	Did not advance	

== Badminton ==
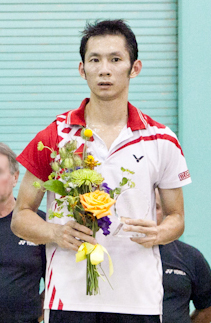
Nguyễn Tiến Minh (pictured in 2011) scored the first winning match for a Vietnamese badminton player at the Olympics

Nguyễn Tiến Minh was Vietnam's only representative in badminton at the 2012 Olympics, competing in the men's singles event. According to the Badminton World Federation, he held a world ranking of 11th as of May 2012, which was well within the top-38 threshold required for a spot. This marked his second Olympic appearance, having previously competed at the 2008 Beijing Games. Leading up to London, Minh trained at the competition venue, London's Wembley Arena, to adapt to the local weather and lighting conditions. At the tournament draw, Minh was named the 10th seed overall and listed in Group D. Adopting a new, resilient defensive style, his goal was to win his group and advance to at least the quarterfinals.

In his opening match on July 29, he defeated Yuhan Tan of Belgium 2–1 (17–21, 21–14, 21–10), securing the first-ever Olympic match victory for a Vietnamese badminton player. Two days later, Minh was eliminated after his match against India's Parupalli Kashyap, with a result of 0–2 (9–21, 14–21). Kashyap, who had been beaten by Minh at the Swiss Open months earlier, delivered a surprising and dominant performance. Minh conceded he was outplayed by his opponent's surprising speed and improvement. Despite his coach's belief that it was his last Olympics, Minh was selected to represent Vietnam again in 2016.

List of badminton events for Vietnamese competitors
Athlete	Event	Group Stage			Elimination	Quarterfinal	Semifinal	Final / BM	
Athlete	Event	Opposition Score	Opposition Score	Rank	Opposition Score	Opposition Score	Opposition Score	Opposition Score	Rank
Nguyễn Tiến Minh	Men's singles	Kashyap (IND); L 9–21, 14–21	Y Tan (BEL); W 17–21, 21–14, 21–10	2	Did not advance				

== Fencing ==
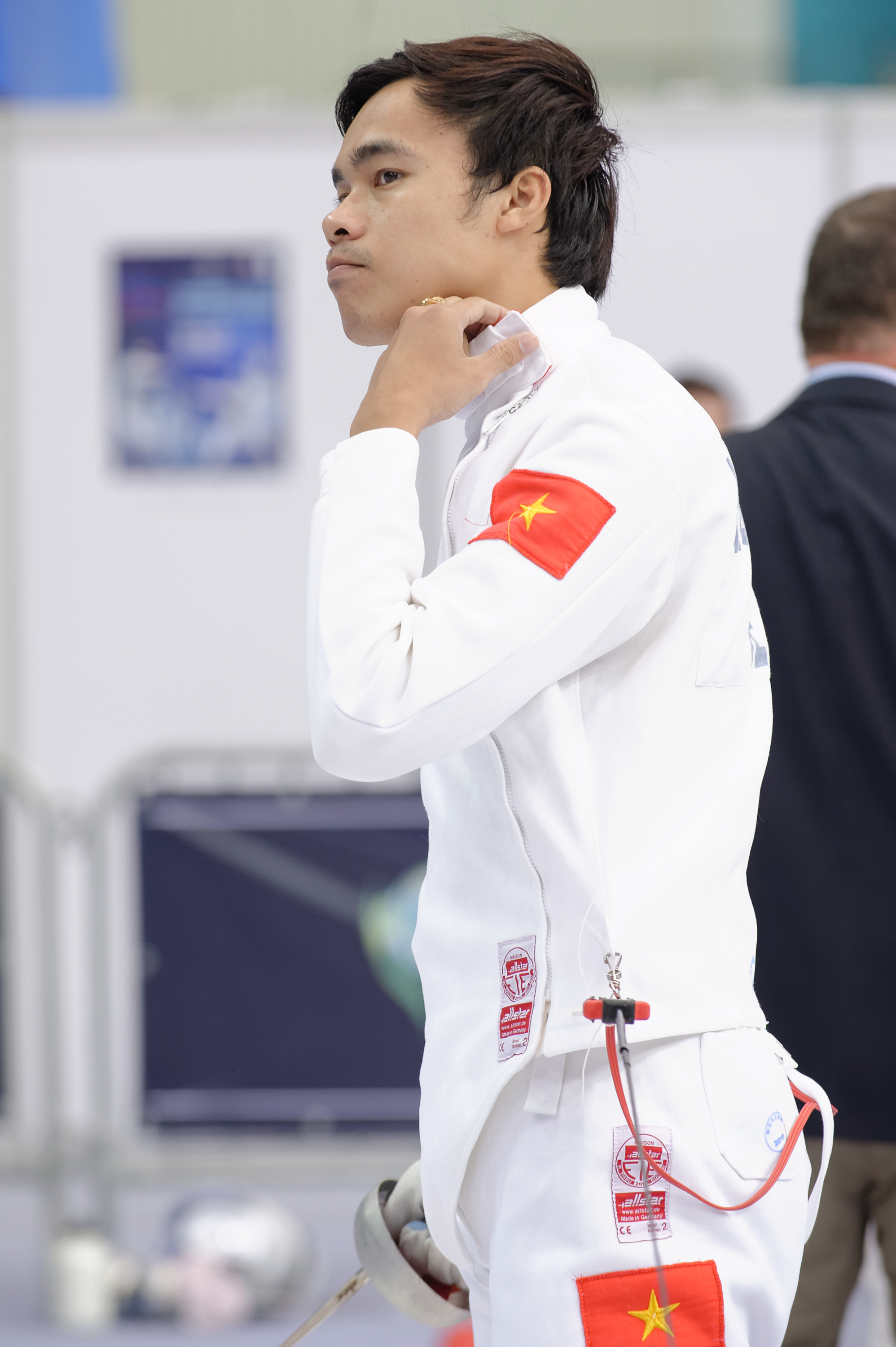
Nguyễn Tiến Nhật (pictured in 2015), Vietnam's first-ever Olympic fencer, served as the country's flag bearer during the opening ceremony.

Nguyễn Tiến Nhật made history as the first Vietnamese fencer to qualify for the Olympics. He secured the spot by reaching the final at the Asia–Oceania Zonal Qualifier in Wakayama, Japan, in April 2012. His qualification was unexpected, as fencing was an obscure sport in Vietnam, and Nhật himself was a relative unknown. The fencer competed in the men's épée event on 1 August, where he was defeated 9–15 in his opening match by Elmir Alimzhanov of Kazakhstan. This result placed him in the penultimate position in the final tournament, only ahead of Hong Kong's Leung Ka Ming.

List of fencing events for Vietnamese competitors
Athlete	Event	Round of 32	Round of 16	Quarterfinal	Semifinal	Final / BM	
Athlete	Event	Opposition Score	Opposition Score	Opposition Score	Opposition Score	Opposition Score	Rank
Nguyễn Tiến Nhật	Individual épée	Alimzhanov (KAZ); L 9–15	Did not advance				

== Gymnastics ==
Vietnam has qualified three athletes

Men

Athlete	Event	Qualification								Final							
Athlete	Event	Apparatus						Total	Rank	Apparatus						Total	Rank
Athlete	Event	F	PH	R	V	PB	HB	Total	Rank	F	PH	R	V	PB	HB	Total	Rank
Phạm Phước Hưng	Rings	—		14.433	—			14.433	40	Did not advance							
Phạm Phước Hưng	Parallel bars	—				15.133	—	15.133	19	Did not advance							

Women

Athlete	Event	Qualification						Final					
Athlete	Event	Apparatus				Total	Rank	Apparatus				Total	Rank
Athlete	Event	F	V	UB	BB	Total	Rank	F	V	UB	BB	Total	Rank
Phan Thị Hà Thanh	Floor	12.466	—			12.466	71	Did not advance					
Phan Thị Hà Thanh	Vault	—	13.533	—		13.533	12 R	Did not advance					
Đỗ Thị Ngân Thương	Uneven bars	—		11.466	—	11.466	73	Did not advance					
Đỗ Thị Ngân Thương	Balance beam	—			11.966	11.966	70	Did not advance					

== Judo ==
Văn Ngọc Tú became the first Vietnamese judoka to qualify for the Olympic Games, a distinction from Cao Ngọc Phương Trinh, who previously competed in the 1996 Summer Olympics via a wildcard entry. According to the International Judo Federation (IJF) ranking system, Tú was ranked 54th globally and second in Asia in the women's −48 kg category, behind only Kazakhstan's Alexandra Podryadova. The Vietnamese judoka received significant investment in training trips to China and South Korea before participating in the 2012 Olympics. On 27 July, she lost her match in the Women's −48 kg category against Sarah Menezes of Brazil. In the five-minute match, Tú conceded two yuko scores after her opponent executed a Seoi nage throw. She finished last among the competitors, ranking alongside Spain's Oiana Blanco and Russia's Nataliya Kondratyeva. Tú was later qualified for the 2016 Games.

List of Judo events for Vietnamese competitor
Athlete	Event	Round of 32	Round of 16	Quarterfinals	Semifinals	Repechage	Final / BM	
Athlete	Event	Opposition Result	Opposition Result	Opposition Result	Opposition Result	Opposition Result	Opposition Result	Rank
Văn Ngọc Tú	Women's −48 kg	Menezes (BRA); L 0002–0021	Did not advance					

== Rowing ==
Phạm Thị Hài and Phạm Thị Thảo became the first Vietnamese rowing athletes to officially qualify for the Olympic Games, securing their spots by winning a bronze medal at the 2012 Asian Rowing Championships in Chungju. The nation's debut in rowing at the 2004 Athens Olympics relied on two athletes receiving wildcard entries. Preparation for the 2012 Games was challenging due to insufficient equipment, with the athletes' gear for the Olympics notably consisting only of four oars. Upon arrival, the Vietnamese rowing team was quartered at the Eton Dorney rowing venue. In the competition, the pair finished last in the lightweight double sculls heats round on 29 July, recording a time of 7:50.06. They subsequently failed to advance to the semi-finals after the repechage round on 31 July, where they finished 5th out of 6 teams with a time of 7:37.64. They ranked 16th overall in the event.

List of rowing events for Vietnamese competitors
Athlete	Event	Heats		Repechage		Semifinals		Final	
Athlete	Event	Time	Rank	Time	Rank	Time	Rank	Time	Rank
Phạm Thị Hài; Phạm Thị Thảo	Lightweight double sculls	7:50.06	5 R	7:37.64	5 FC	Bye		7:51.82	16
FC = Final C (non-medal); R = Repechage

== Shooting ==
External videos
- Shooting - 50m Pistol - Men's Final – London 2012 Olympic Games

Vietnam has qualified two athletes

Men

Athlete	Event	Qualification		Final	
Athlete	Event	Points	Rank	Points	Rank
Hoàng Xuân Vinh	10 m air pistol	582	9	Did not advance	
Hoàng Xuân Vinh	50 m pistol	563	4 Q	658.5	4

Women

Athlete	Event	Qualification		Final	
Athlete	Event	Points	Rank	Points	Rank
Lê Thị Hoàng Ngọc	25 m pistol	574	32	Did not advance	
Lê Thị Hoàng Ngọc	10 m air pistol	379	21	Did not advance	

== Swimming ==
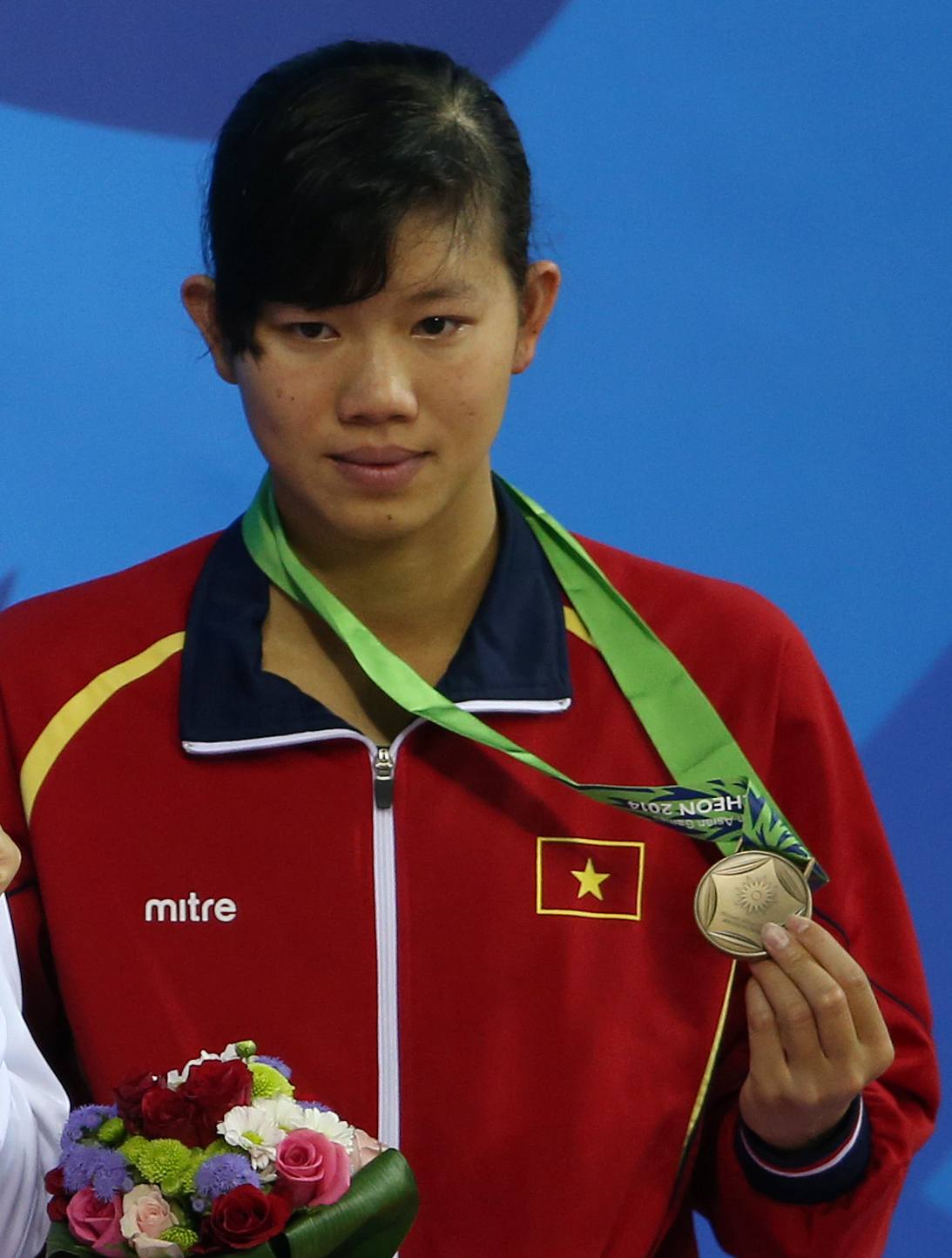
At 16, Nguyễn Thị Ánh Viên (pictured in 2014) was the youngest Vietnamese athlete to ever compete at the Olympics

Nguyễn Thị Ánh Viên was the only Vietnamese swimmer named on the International Swimming Federation's (FINA) final qualification list in July 2012. She secured her spot by achieving four B standards at the Southeast Asian Swimming Championships. At 16, Viên was the youngest Vietnamese athlete to compete at the Games, and the first swimmer from Vietnam to qualify outright, without relying on a wildcard entry. She competed in two events after training in the United States. In the women's 400m individual medley on 28 July, she won her heat with a time of 4:50.32 but did not qualify for the final, placing 28th out of 35 swimmers. On 2 August, she competed in the women's 200m backstroke as the only representative from Southeast Asia. She won her heat again with a time of 2:13.35, an improvement on her Olympic B standard time of 2:13.84. However, she could not advance to the semi-finals and finished 26th overall. Viên went on to compete at the 2016 Summer Olympics.

List of swimming events for Vietnamese competitors
Athlete	Event	Heat		Semifinal		Final	
Athlete	Event	Time	Rank	Time	Rank	Time	Rank
Nguyễn Thị Ánh Viên	200 m backstroke	2:13.35	26	Did not advance			
Nguyễn Thị Ánh Viên	400 m individual medley	4:50.32	28	—		Did not advance	

== Taekwondo ==
Vietnam has qualified two athletes.

Athlete	Event	Round of 16	Quarterfinals	Semifinals	Repechage	Bronze Medal	Final	
Athlete	Event	Opposition Result	Opposition Result	Opposition Result	Opposition Result	Opposition Result	Opposition Result	Rank
Lê Huỳnh Châu	Men's −58 kg	Wei C-Y (TPE); L 1–5	Did not advance					
Chu Hoàng Diệu Linh	Women's −67 kg	Fromm (GER); L 1–13 PTG	Did not advance					

== Weightlifting ==
External videos
- Weightlifting – 56kg Men's Group A – London 2012 Olympic Games

Vietnam has qualified two athletes

Athlete	Event	Snatch		Clean & Jerk		Total	Rank
Athlete	Event	Result	Rank	Result	Rank	Total	Rank
Trần Lê Quốc Toàn	Men's −56 kg	125	6	159	2	284	3rd place, bronze medalist(s)
Nguyễn Thị Thuý	Women's −53 kg	85	8	110	7	195	8

== Wrestling ==
In April 2012, Nguyễn Thị Lụa became the first Vietnamese wrestler to ever qualify for the Olympic Games, securing her spot with a silver medal at the Asian Qualifiers in Astana, Kazakhstan. Lụa pushed through a shoulder injury from Kazakhstan to continue training for the London Games. However, her efforts were undermined by disorganized preparation. Promised training trips abroad were cancelled, leaving her to work with a North Korean coach who was ultimately barred from accompanying her to the competition. Lacking proper resources, she contended with inadequate equipment, managed a difficult weight cut alone while injured, and was denied her wish to attend the opening ceremony due to scheduling. Lụa was eliminated from the women's freestyle 48 kg competition on 8 August, losing her match to Canada's Carol Huynh. The match ended in just 34 seconds when Huynh pinned Lụa for a 5–0 victory, resulting in a final ranking of 16th for Lụa. The wrestler was later included in the list of athletes competing in the 2016 Summer Olympics.

List of wrestling events for Vietnamese competitors
Athlete	Event	Qualification	Round of 16	Quarterfinal	Semifinal	Repechage 1	Repechage 2	Final / BM	
Athlete	Event	Opposition Result	Opposition Result	Opposition Result	Opposition Result	Opposition Result	Opposition Result	Opposition Result	Rank
Nguyễn Thị Lụa	−48 kg	Bye	Huynh (CAN); L 0–5 ^{VT}	Did not advance					16
"Bye" = Athlete not required to compete in round; "VT" = Victory by Fall

== See also ==
- Vietnam at the 2012 Summer Paralympics
