= Vietnam at the 1996 Summer Olympics =

- IOC code: VIE
- NOC: Vietnam Olympic Committee
- Website: www.voc.org.vn (in Vietnamese and English)

in Atlanta
- Competitors: 6 in 4 sports
- Flag bearer: Hữu Huy Nguyễn
- Officials: 2
- Medals: Gold 0 Silver 0 Bronze 0 Total 0

Summer Olympics appearances (overview)
- 1952; 1956; 1960; 1964; 1968; 1972; 1976; 1980; 1984; 1988; 1992; 1996; 2000; 2004; 2008; 2012; 2016; 2020; 2024

Vietnam competed at the 1996 Summer Olympics in Atlanta, United States. The Vietnam Sports Contingent participated in Atlanta with twelve members including six athletes, four coaches and two officials in four sports disciplines: athletics, swimming, shooting and judo.

== Results by event ==
=== Athletics ===
Men's 100m

- Lâm Hải Vân
  1. Round 1 — 11.14 (did not advance)

Women's 100m Hurdles

- Vũ Bích Hường → 39th place (13:85)

=== Judo ===
Women's 48 kg

- Cao Ngọc Phương Trinh → Round of 16

=== Shooting ===
Men's 50m pistol

- Trịnh Quốc Việt → 44th place (535 points)

=== Swimming ===
Men's 200m Backstroke

- Trương Ngọc Tuấn → 38th place (2:12.05)

Women's 50m Freestyle

- Võ Trần Trường An → 52nd place (29.02)
