= Vietnam at the 1992 Summer Olympics =

- IOC code: VIE
- NOC: Vietnam Olympic Committee

in Barcelona
- Competitors: 7 in 3 sports
- Officials: 2
- Medals: Gold 0 Silver 0 Bronze 0 Total 0

Summer Olympics appearances (overview)
- 1952; 1956; 1960; 1964; 1968; 1972; 1976; 1980; 1984; 1988; 1992; 1996; 2000; 2004; 2008; 2012; 2016; 2020; 2024

Vietnam competed at the 1992 Summer Olympics in Barcelona, Spain. The delegation included twelve members (seven athletes, three coaches, and two officials) in three events: athletics, swimming, and shooting.

== Competitors ==
The following is the list of number of competitors in the Games.

Sport	Men	Women	Total
Athletics	1	3	4
Shooting	1	0	1
Swimming	0	2	2
Total	2	5	7

== Results by event ==
=== Athletics ===
Men's Marathon

- Lưu Văn Hùng (Note: otherwise Luu Van Hung or Hung Van Luu) → 85th place (2:56.42)

Women's Marathon

- Đặng Thị Tèo → Did not finish

=== Swimming ===
Women's 100m Breaststroke

- Nguyễn Thị Phương
  1. Heat – DSQ (→ did not advance, no ranking)

Women's 200m Breaststroke

- Nguyễn Thị Phương
  1. Heat – 2:57.71 (→ did not advance, 38th place)

Women's 100m Butterfly

- Nguyễn Kiều Oanh
  1. Heat – 1:05.19 (→ did not advance, 42nd place)

Women's 200m Individual Medley

- Nguyễn Kiều Oanh
  1. Heat – 2:35.71 (→ did not advance, 41st place)
