= Vietnam at the 1972 Summer Olympics =

- IOC code: VIE (VNM used at these Games)
- NOC: Vietnam Olympic Committee

in Munich
- Competitors: 2 in 1 sport
- Medals: Gold 0 Silver 0 Bronze 0 Total 0

Summer Olympics appearances (overview)
- 1952; 1956; 1960; 1964; 1968; 1972; 1976; 1980; 1984; 1988; 1992; 1996; 2000; 2004; 2008; 2012; 2016; 2020; 2024

The Republic of Vietnam competed as Vietnam at the 1972 Summer Olympics in Munich, West Germany. Two competitors took part in one event in one sport.

== Shooting ==
Two shooters represented Vietnam in 1972.

50 m pistol

- Hồ Minh Thu – 49th Place
- Hương Hoàng Thi – 56th Place
