= Lyubcho Dyakov =

Bulgarian sport shooter

Olympic medal record

Shooting

Representing Bulgaria
Bronze medal – third place	1980 Moskva	50 metre pistol

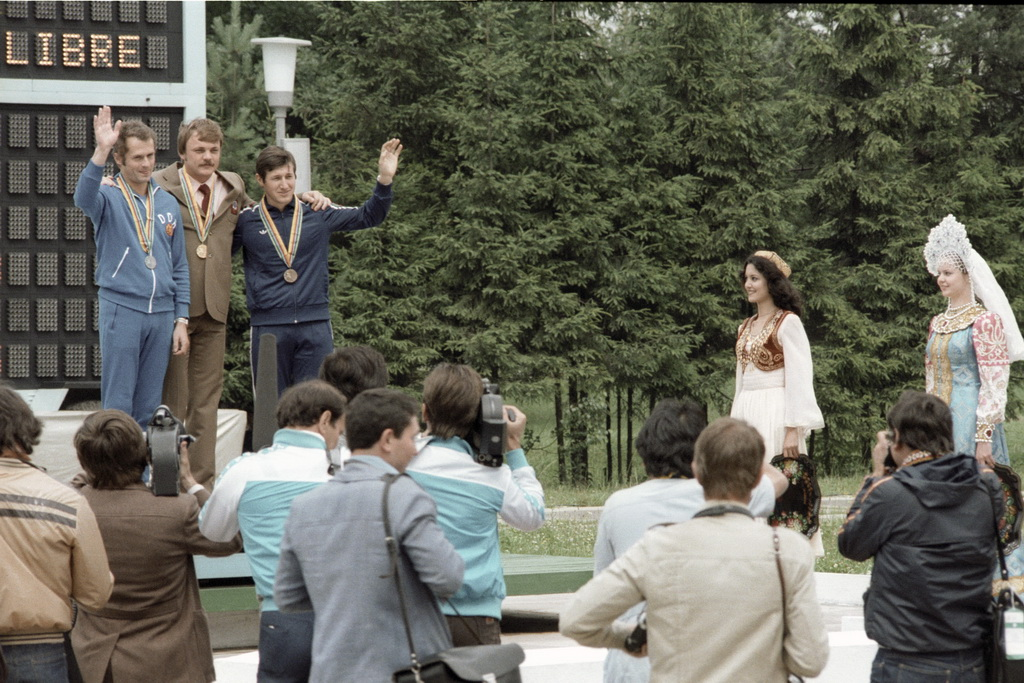
Olympic free pistol (50 meters) champions (left to right): Harald Vollmar (GDR) - silver, Aleksandr Melentjev (USSR) - gold and Lubcho Diakov - bronze.

Lyubcho Dyakov (Bulgarian: Любчо Дяков; born 17 May 1954) is a Bulgarian former sport shooter who competed in the 1976 Summer Olympics, in the 1980 Summer Olympics, and in the 1988 Summer Olympics.
