= Gymnastics at the 2008 Summer Olympics – Qualification =

== Qualification Summary ==
* Artistic Gymnastics, NOCs with 6 entered athletes may also enter the team competition.

Nation	Artistic		Rhythmic		Trampoline		Total
Nation	Men	Women	Individual	Group	Men	Women	Total
Australia	1	6	1		1		9
Austria			1				1
Azerbaijan			2	6			8
Belarus	6	1	2	6	1	1	17
Belgium	1	1					2
Brazil	1	6		6			13
Bulgaria	1	1	2	6			10
Canada	6	2	1		1	2	12
Cape Verde			1				1
China	6	6	1	6	2	2	23
Colombia	1	1					2
Croatia	1	1					2
Czech Republic	1	1				1	3
Denmark					1		1
Egypt	1	1					2
Estonia			1				1
Finland		1					1
France	6	6			1		13
Georgia	1					1	2
Germany	6	6			1	1	14
Great Britain	2	6				1	9
Greece	1	1	1	6			9
Hungary	1	1					2
Israel	1		2	6			9
Italy	6	6		6	1		19
Japan	6	6		6	2	1	21
Kazakhstan			1				1
Lithuania		1					1
Luxembourg	1						1
Mexico		1					1
Netherlands	1	1					2
North Korea		2					2
Poland	1	1	1				3
Portugal					1	1	2
Puerto Rico	1						1
Romania	6	6					12
Russia	6	6	2	6	2	2	24
Slovakia		1					1
Slovenia	1	1					2
South Africa			1				1
South Korea	6	1	1				8
Spain	6	2	1	6			15
Switzerland	2	1					3
Ukraine	2	6	2	6	1	1	18
United States	6	6			1	1	14
Uzbekistan	1					1	2
Venezuela	1	1					2
Vietnam		1					1
Yemen	1						1
Total: 49 NOCs	98	98	24	72	16	16	324

== Qualification timeline ==
Event	Date	Venue
2007 World Artistic Gymnastics Championships	September 1–9, 2007	(Germany) Stuttgart
2007 World Rhythmic Gymnastics Championships	September 19–21, 2007	(Greece) Patras
2007 World Trampoline Championships	Nov 30 – Dec 3, 2007	(Canada) Quebec
Tripartite Invitation	March 17, 2008	-

== Artistic ==
An NOC may enter up to 6 men and 6 women athletes. Qualification is based on the results of the 2007 World Artistic Gymnastics Championships.

=== Men ===
Event	Criterion	Qualified	Athletes per NOC
World Championship	Teams places 1-12	China; Japan; Germany; United States; South Korea; Spain; Russia; Romania; France; Italy; Canada; Belarus	6
World Championship	Teams places 13-15	Ukraine; Switzerland; Great Britain	2
World Championship	Teams places 16-18	Puerto Rico; Brazil; Greece	1
World Championship	Top 7 athletes from NOCs not already qualified	(Bulgaria) Yordan Yovchev (Uzbekistan) Anton Fokin (Croatia) Filip Ude (Venezuela) José Luis Fuentes (Netherlands) Epke Zonderland (Czech Republic) Martin Konečný (Georgia (country)) Ilia Giorgadze	
World Championship	Individual Apparatus Gold medal winners	(Poland) Leszek Blanik (Slovenia) Mitja Petkovšek	
World Championship	FIG Executive Board Invitations*	(Australia) Samuel Simpson (Egypt) Mohamed Serour	
World Championship	Additional athletes from NOCs not already qualified	(Hungary) Róbert Gál (Belgium) Koen Van Damme (Luxembourg) Sascha Palgen (Israel) Alexander Shatilov (Colombia) Jorge Hugo Giraldo	
Tripartite Invitation		(Yemen) Nashwan Al-Harazi	
TOTAL		98	

* Ensure participation of the Host Nation and each continent.

=== Women ===
Event	Criterion	Qualified	Athletes per NOC
World Championship	Teams places 1-12	United States; China; Romania; Italy; Brazil; France; Great Britain; Russia; Ukraine; Germany; Australia; Japan	6
World Championship	Teams places 13-15	North Korea; Canada; Spain	2
World Championship	Teams places 16-18	Czech Republic; Netherlands; Switzerland	1
World Championship	Top 9 athletes from NOCs not already qualified	(Greece) Stefani Bismpikou (Belarus) Nastassia Marachkouskaya (Hungary) Dorina Böczögő (Colombia) Natalia Sánchez (Mexico) Marisela Cantù (South Korea) Jo Hyun-Joo (Poland) Marta Pihan (Belgium) Gaelle Mys (Slovenia) Adela Šajn	
World Championship	Individual Apparatus Gold medal winners	-	
World Championship	FIG Executive Board Invitations*	(Egypt) Sherine El Zeiny	
World Championship	Additional athletes from NOCs not already qualified	(Croatia) Tina Erceg (Finland) Annamari Maaranen (Venezuela) Jessica López (Bulgaria) Nikolina Tankoucheva (Slovakia) Ivana Kovacova (Lithuania) Jelena Zanevskaya	
Tripartite Invitation		(Vietnam) Do Thi Ngan Thuong	
TOTAL		98	

* Ensure participation of the Host Nation and each continent.

== Rhythmic ==
An NOC may enter up to 1 Group and 2 athletes for individual competition. Qualification is based on the results of the 2007 World Rhythmic Gymnastics Championships.

=== Individual ===
Event	Criterion	Qualified
World Championship	Top 20	Ukraine; Russia; Russia; Belarus; Azerbaijan; Kazakhstan; Israel; Belarus; Canada; Bulgaria; Spain; Greece; Azerbaijan; Austria; Bulgaria; Poland; South Korea; Estonia; Ukraine; Israel
World Championship	FIG Executive Board*	(China) Li Hongyang (South Africa) Odette Richard (Australia) Naazmi Johnston
Tripartite Invitation		(Cape Verde) Wania Monteiro
TOTAL		24

* Ensure participation of the Host Nation and each continent.

=== Group ===
Event	Criterion	Qualified
World Championship	Top 10	Russia; Italy; Belarus; Bulgaria; Spain; Israel; Japan; Ukraine; China; Azerbaijan
World Championship	FIG Executive Board*	Brazil; Greece
TOTAL		12

* Ensure participation of the Host Nation and each continent.

== Trampoline ==
An NOC may enter up to 2 men and 2 women athletes. Qualification is based on the results of the 2007 World Championships.

=== Men ===
Event	Criterion	Qualified
World Championship	Top 14	China; China; Russia; Germany; Japan; Japan; Russia; Italy; Ukraine; Canada; Denmark; Belarus; France; Portugal; United States**
World Championship	FIG Executive Board*	(Australia) Ben Wilden
Tripartite Invitation**		-
TOTAL		16

* Ensure participation of the Host Nation and each continent.

** The tripartite commission invitation was returned to the FIG since no NOC met both the requirements of the commission and the FIG and was awarded to the next eligible federation from the world championships.

=== Women ===
Event	Criterion	Qualified
World Championship	Top 15	Russia; China; Russia; China; Canada; Germany; Belarus; Canada; Great Britain; Japan; Uzbekistan; Portugal; Ukraine; Georgia; United States; Czech Republic**
World Championship	FIG Executive Board*	-
Tripartite Invitation**		-
TOTAL		16

* Ensure participation of the Host Nation and each continent.

** The tripartite commission invitation was returned to the FIG since no NOC met both the requirements of the commission and the FIG and was awarded to the next eligible federation from the world championships.
