= Nguyễn Mạnh Tuấn =

Vietnamese swimmer (born 1947)

Personal information
- Born: 6 June 1947 (age 79) Thái Bình Province, North Vietnam

Sport
- Sport: Swimming

Nguyễn Mạnh Tuấn (born 6 June 1947) is a Vietnamese former swimmer. He competed in two events at the 1980 Summer Olympics. He was also the flag bearer for the Vietnamese team. He is from Thái Bình Province.
