= Shooting at the 1980 Summer Olympics – Mixed 50 metre pistol =

Sports shooting at the Olympics

Mixed 50 metre pistol at the Games of the XXII Olympiad
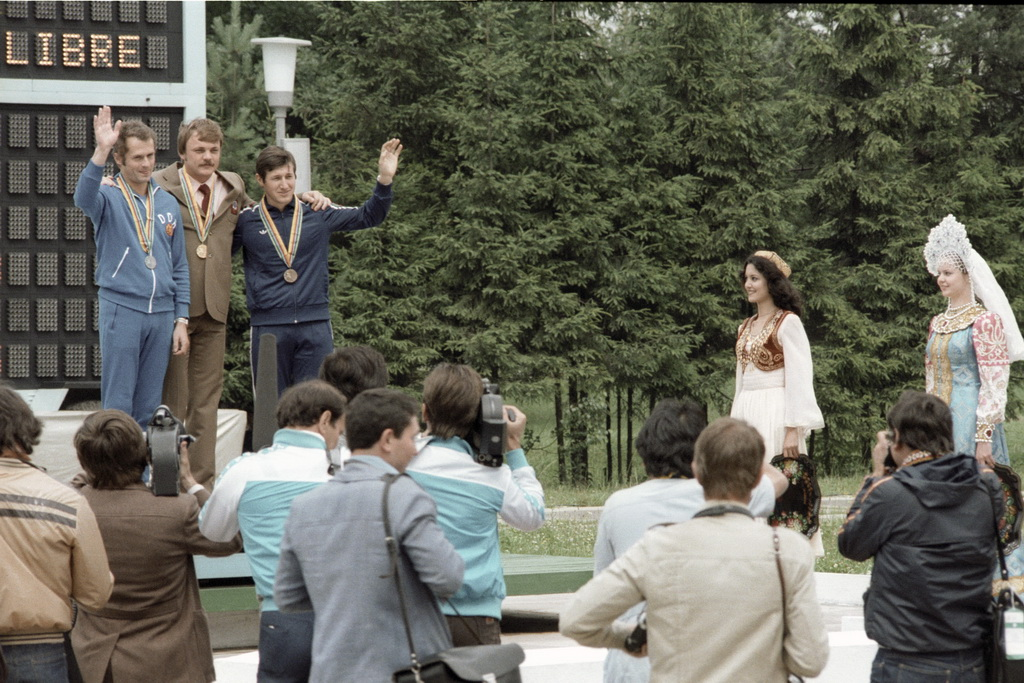
- Medal winners in 50 metre pistol. From left to right: Harald Vollmar, Aleksandr Melentyev and Lyubcho Dyakov.
- Venue: Dynamo Shooting Range
- Date: 20 July 1980
- Competitors: 33 from 19 nations
- Winning score: 581 WR

Medalists
| 1st place, gold medalist(s) | | Aleksandr Melentyev; Soviet Union |
| 2nd place, silver medalist(s) | | Harald Vollmar; East Germany |
| 3rd place, bronze medalist(s) | | Lyubcho Dyakov; Bulgaria |

The mixed (or "open") ISSF 50 meter pistol was one of the seven sport shooting events at the 1980 Summer Olympics. There were 33 competitors from 19 nations. Nations had been limited to two shooters each since the 1952 Games. The gold medal was won by Aleksandr Melentyev of the Soviet Union who broke the world record with 581 points. It was the Soviet Union's third victory in the event, second-most behind the United States at four. Melentyev defeated Harald Vollmar of East Germany by 13 points. For Vollmar this was his third Olympic medal in the same event, having won silver at 1976 Montreal and bronze at 1968 Mexico City. Vollmar was the first man to win at least three medals in the free pistol. Lyubcho Dyakov's bronze was Bulgaria's first medal in the event.

== Background ==
This was the 15th appearance of the ISSF 50 meter pistol event. The event was held at every Summer Olympics from 1896 to 1920 (except 1904, when no shooting events were held) and from 1936 to 2016; it was nominally open to women from 1968 to 1980, although very few women participated these years. A separate women's event would be introduced in 1984. 1896 and 1908 were the only Games in which the distance was not 50 metres; the former used 30 metres and the latter 50 yards.

Three of the top 10 shooters from the 1976 Games returned: gold medalist Uwe Potteck of East Germany, silver medalist (and 1968 bronze medalist and 1972 fifth-place finisher) Harald Vollmar of East Germany, and fifth-place finisher (and 1972 gold medalist) Ragnar Skanåker of Sweden. Moritz Minder of Switzerland was the reigning (1978) world champion and world record holder, but was not competing in Moscow due to the American-led boycott. Skanåker had been the runner-up.

Ireland, Laos, North Korea, and Zimbabwe each made their debut in the event. Sweden made its 13th appearance, matching the boycotting United States for most of any nation.

Melentyev used a TsKIB SOO MЦ55.

== Competition format ==
Each shooter fired 60 shots, in 6 series of 10 shots each, at a distance of 50 metres. The target was round, 50 centimetres in diameter, with 10 scoring rings. Scoring for each shot was up to 10 points, in increments of 1 point. The maximum score possible was 600 points. Any pistol was permitted.

== Records ==
Prior to this competition, the existing world and Olympic records were as follows.

| World record | Moritz Minder (SUI) | 577 | | |
| Olympic record | Uwe Potteck (GDR) | 573 | Montreal, Canada | 18 July 1976 |

Aleksandr Melentyev beat the world record by 4 points, finishing at 581 points.

== Schedule ==
| Date | Time | Round |
|---|---|---|
| Sunday, 20 July 1980 | 9:00 | Final |

== Results ==
| Rank | Shooter | Nation | 1 | 2 | 3 | 4 | 5 | 6 | Total | Notes |
|---|---|---|---|---|---|---|---|---|---|---|
| 1st place, gold medalist(s) | Aleksandr Melentyev | Soviet Union | 95 | 96 | 98 | 98 | 98 | 96 | 581 | WR |
| 2nd place, silver medalist(s) | Harald Vollmar | East Germany | 93 | 93 | 93 | 97 | 98 | 94 | 568 | |
| 3rd place, bronze medalist(s) | Lyubcho Dyakov | Bulgaria | 96 | 92 | 93 | 92 | 95 | 97 | 565 | |
| 4 | So Gil-San | North Korea | 91 | 97 | 94 | 93 | 93 | 97 | 565 | |
| 5 | Seppo Saarenpää | Finland | 91 | 98 | 96 | 94 | 95 | 91 | 565 | |
| 6 | Sergei Pyzhianov | Soviet Union | 91 | 96 | 92 | 96 | 94 | 95 | 564 | |
| 7 | Ragnar Skanåker | Sweden | 90 | 94 | 94 | 95 | 93 | 97 | 563 | |
| 8 | Paavo Palokangas | Finland | 91 | 94 | 93 | 96 | 94 | 93 | 561 | |
| 9 | Sylvio Carvalho | Brazil | 91 | 94 | 89 | 95 | 93 | 96 | 558 | |
| 10 | Sławomir Romanowski | Poland | 89 | 96 | 82 | 92 | 95 | 94 | 558 | |
| 11 | Lyuben Popov | Bulgaria | 91 | 92 | 94 | 95 | 92 | 94 | 558 | |
| 11 | Enrico Rabbachin | Italy | 88 | 92 | 95 | 95 | 97 | 91 | 558 | |
| 13 | Erwin Matelski | Poland | 92 | 95 | 90 | 92 | 93 | 95 | 557 | |
| 13 | Lajos Nagy | Hungary | 91 | 93 | 94 | 94 | 91 | 94 | 557 | |
| 13 | Ivan Némethy | Czechoslovakia | 96 | 92 | 95 | 90 | 93 | 91 | 557 | |
| 16 | Uwe Potteck | East Germany | 91 | 91 | 94 | 93 | 93 | 94 | 556 | |
| 17 | Daniel Iuga | Romania | 95 | 90 | 92 | 91 | 95 | 92 | 555 | |
| 18 | Carlos Hora | Peru | 92 | 93 | 91 | 94 | 90 | 91 | 551 | |
| 18 | Kim Ji-jong | North Korea | 88 | 93 | 90 | 93 | 96 | 91 | 551 | |
| 20 | Phan Huy Khảng | Vietnam | 91 | 89 | 93 | 93 | 93 | 91 | 550 | |
| 21 | Rudolf Seres | Hungary | 93 | 95 | 88 | 90 | 90 | 93 | 549 | |
| 22 | Ngô Hữu Kính | Vietnam | 91 | 91 | 90 | 94 | 93 | 89 | 548 | |
| 23 | Staffan Oscarsson | Sweden | 89 | 87 | 93 | 96 | 93 | 89 | 547 | |
| 24 | Roberto Ferraris | Italy | 96 | 87 | 91 | 93 | 95 | 84 | 546 | |
| 25 | Ken Stanford | Ireland | 87 | 89 | 87 | 95 | 95 | 92 | 545 | |
| 26 | Mariano Lara | Costa Rica | 93 | 89 | 93 | 88 | 91 | 88 | 542 | |
| 27 | Ian Redmond | Zimbabwe | 83 | 92 | 91 | 85 | 89 | 87 | 527 | |
| 28 | Maureen Reichert | Zimbabwe | 88 | 86 | 81 | 90 | 90 | 89 | 524 | |
| 29 | Rodrigo Ruiz | Costa Rica | 84 | 89 | 84 | 84 | 79 | 92 | 512 | |
| 30 | Gianfranco Giardi | San Marino | 89 | 85 | 83 | 86 | 84 | 82 | 509 | |
| 31 | Eliseo Paolini | San Marino | 87 | 81 | 89 | 90 | 84 | 76 | 507 | |
| 32 | Souvanny Souksavath | Laos | 84 | 88 | 86 | 80 | 88 | 76 | 502 | |
| 33 | Syseuy | Laos | 80 | 81 | 79 | 85 | 81 | 75 | 481 | |
