= Erwin Matelski =

Polish sports shooter

Personal information
- Nationality: Polish
- Born: 3 February 1936 (age 89); Łódź, Poland

Sport
- Sport: Sports shooting

Erwin Matelski (born 3 February 1936) is a Polish sports shooter. He competed in the mixed 50 metre free pistol event at the 1980 Summer Olympics.
