= Vietnam at the 2024 Summer Olympics =

- IOC code: VIE
- NOC: Vietnam Olympic Committee
- Website: www.voc.org.vn (in English)

in Paris, France 26 July 2024 – 11 August 2024
- Competitors: 16 (4 men and 12 women) in 11 sports
- Flag bearers: Lê Đức Phát & Nguyễn Thị Thật
- Medals: Gold 0 Silver 0 Bronze 0 Total 0

Summer Olympics appearances (overview)
- 1952; 1956; 1960; 1964; 1968; 1972; 1976; 1980; 1984; 1988; 1992; 1996; 2000; 2004; 2008; 2012; 2016; 2020; 2024; 2028

Vietnam competed at the 2024 Summer Olympics in Paris from 26 July to 11 August 2024. It was the nation's eleventh appearance at the Olympics as a reunified republic, although the Vietnamese athletes previously attended six other editions under the banner of the State of Vietnam or South Vietnam, except on two occasions: in 1976, as the result of an impact areas in the nation's warzones during the Vietnam War, and in 1984 due to the nation's support for the Soviet-led boycott. It was the second consecutive time Vietnam had failed to win any medals since the 2016 Summer Olympics. Like in 2020, Vietnam finished the Summer Olympics without a single medal earned.

== Competitors ==
The following is the list of number of competitors in the Games.

Sport	Men	Women	Total
Archery	1	1	2
Athletics	0	1	1
Badminton	1	1	2
Boxing	0	2	2
Canoeing	0	1	1
Cycling	0	1	1
Judo	0	1	1
Rowing	0	1	1
Shooting	0	2	2
Swimming	1	1	2
Weightlifting	1	0	1
Total	4	12	16

== Archery ==
Two Vietnamese archer qualified for the 2024 Summer Olympics men's and individual recurve competition by virtue of their result at the 2024 Final Qualification Tournament in Antalya, Turkey; and world ranking performances.

Athlete	Event	Ranking round		Round of 64	Round of 32	Round of 16	Quarterfinals	Semifinals	Final / BM	
Athlete	Event	Score	Seed	Opposition Score	Opposition Score	Opposition Score	Opposition Score	Opposition Score	Opposition Score	Rank
Lê Quốc Phong	Men's individual	652	47	Olaru (MDA); L 0–6	Did not advance					
Đỗ Thị Ánh Nguyệt	Women's individual	648	37	Fallah (IRI); L 5–6	Did not advance					
Lê Quốc Phong; Đỗ Thị Ánh Nguyệt	Mixed team	1300	24	—N/a		Did not advance				

== Athletics ==
Vietnam sent one sprinter to compete at the 2024 Summer Olympics.

Key

- Note–Ranks given for track events are within the athlete's heat only
- Q = Qualified for the next round
- q = Qualified for the next round as a fastest loser or, in field events, by position without achieving the qualifying target
- NR = National record
- N/A = Round not applicable for the event
- Bye = Athlete not required to compete in round

Track events

Athlete	Event	Preliminary		Heat		Repechage		Semifinal		Final	
Athlete	Event	Result	Rank	Result	Rank	Result	Rank	Result	Rank	Result	Rank
Trần Thị Nhi Yến	Women's 100 m	11.81	1	11.79	7	Did not advance					

== Badminton ==
Vietnam entered two badminton players into the Olympic tournament based on the BWF Race to Paris Rankings.

Athlete	Event	Group stage			Elimination	Quarter-final	Semi-final	Final / BM	
Athlete	Event	Opposition Score	Opposition Score	Rank	Opposition Score	Opposition Score	Opposition Score	Opposition Score	Rank
Lê Đức Phát	Men's singles	Roth (GER); W (21–10, 21–10)	Prannoy (IND); L (21–16, 11–21, 12–21)	2	Did not advance				
Nguyễn Thùy Linh	Women's singles	Ho (AUS); W (21–6, 21–3)	Zhang (USA); L (20–22, 20–22)	2	Did not advance				

== Boxing ==
Vietnam entered two boxers. Võ Thị Kim Ánh (women's bantamweight) secured a quota by finishing in the top four at the 2024 World Boxing Olympic Qualification Tournament 1 in Busto Arsizio, Italy. Hà Thị Linh (women's lightweight) secured her spots following the triumph in quota bouts round, at the 2024 World Olympic Qualification Tournament 2 in Bangkok, Thailand.

Athlete	Event	Round of 32	Round of 16	Quarterfinals	Semifinals	Final	
Athlete	Event	Opposition Result	Opposition Result	Opposition Result	Opposition Result	Opposition Result	Rank
Võ Thị Kim Ánh	Women's 54 kg	Pawar (IND); L 0–5	Did not advance				
Hà Thị Linh	Women's 60 kg	Epenisa (TGA); W 5–0	Yang Wenlu (CHN); L 0–5	Did not advance			

== Canoeing ==
=== Sprint ===
For the first time since 2004, Vietnam canoeists qualified one boat for the Games through the result of highest rank eligible nation's in the following events, through the 2024 Asian Sprint Canoeing Championships in Tokyo, Japan.

Athlete	Event	Heats		Quarterfinals		Semifinals		Final	
Athlete	Event	Time	Rank	Time	Rank	Time	Rank	Time	Rank
Nguyễn Thị Hương	Women's C-1 200 m	49.74	6 QF	49.09	6	Did not advance			

Qualification Legend: FA = Qualify to final (medal); FB = Qualify to final B (non-medal)

== Cycling ==
=== Road ===
For the first time since 1988, Vietnam entered one female rider to compete in the road race events at the Olympic, through the re-allocation of unused quota places via the establishment of UCI Nation Ranking.

Athlete	Event	Time	Rank
Nguyễn Thị Thật	Women's road race	4:10:47	73

== Judo ==
Vietnam qualified one judoka for the following weight class at the Games. Hoàng Thị Tình (women's extra-lightweight, 48 kg) got qualified via continental quota based on Olympic point rankings.

Athlete	Event	Round of 32	Round of 16	Quarterfinals	Semifinals	Repechage	Final / BM	
Athlete	Event	Opposition Result	Opposition Result	Opposition Result	Opposition Result	Opposition Result	Opposition Result	Rank
Hoàng Thị Tình	Women's –48 kg	Bedioui (TUN); L 00–01	Did not advance					

== Rowing ==
Vietnam rowers qualified one boats in the women's single sculls for the Games, through the 2024 Asian & Oceania Continental Qualification Regatta in Chungju, South Korea.

Athlete	Event	Heats		Repechage		Quarterfinals		Semifinals		Final	
Athlete	Event	Time	Rank	Time	Rank	Time	Rank	Time	Rank	Time	Rank
Phạm Thị Huệ	Women's single sculls	8:03.84	4 R	8:00.97	2 QF	7:56.96	6 SC/D	8:22.85	6 FD	7:47.84	23

Qualification Legend: FA=Final A (medal); FB=Final B (non-medal); FC=Final C (non-medal); FD=Final D (non-medal); FE=Final E (non-medal); FF=Final F (non-medal); SA/B=Semifinals A/B; SC/D=Semifinals C/D; SE/F=Semifinals E/F; QF=Quarterfinals; R=Repechage

== Shooting ==
External videos
- Women's 10m Air Pistol Shooting – Paris 2024 Highlights
- 25m pistol women's shooting – Paris 2024

Vietnamese shooters achieved quota places for the following events based on their results at the 2022 and 2023 ISSF World Championships, 2023 and 2024 Asian Championships, and 2024 ISSF World Olympic Qualification Tournament.

Athlete	Event	Qualification		Final	
Athlete	Event	Points	Rank	Points	Rank
Trịnh Thu Vinh	Women's 10 m air pistol	578	4 Q	198.6	4
Trịnh Thu Vinh	Women's 25 m pistol	587	4 Q	16	7
Lê Thị Mộng Tuyền	Women's 10 m air rifle	621.1	40	Did not advance	

== Swimming ==
Vietnamese swimmers achieved the entry standards in the following events for Paris 2024 (a maximum of two swimmers under the Olympic Qualifying Time (OST) and potentially at the Olympic Consideration Time (OCT)):

Athlete	Event	Heat		Semifinal		Final	
Athlete	Event	Time	Rank	Time	Rank	Time	Rank
Nguyễn Huy Hoàng	Men's 800 m freestyle	8:08.39	28	—N/a		Did not advance	
Nguyễn Huy Hoàng	Men's 1500 m freestyle	15:18.63	21	—N/a		Did not advance	
Võ Thị Mỹ Tiên	Women's 200 m medley	2:17.18	27	Did not advance			

== Weightlifting ==
Vietnam entered one weightlifter into the Olympic competition. Trịnh Văn Vinh (men's 61 kg) secured one of the top ten slots in their respective weight divisions based on the IWF Olympic Qualification Rankings.

Athlete	Event	Snatch		Clean & Jerk		Total	Rank
Athlete	Event	Result	Rank	Result	Rank	Total	Rank
Trịnh Văn Vinh	Men's −61 kg	~~128~~	DNF	—	–	—	DNF
