= Vietnam at the 2020 Summer Olympics =

- IOC code: VIE
- NOC: Vietnam Olympic Committee
- Website: www.voc.org.vn (in Vietnamese and English)

in Tokyo, Japan July 23, 2021 – August 8, 2021
- Competitors: 18 in 11 sports
- Flag bearers (opening): Quách Thị Lan; Nguyễn Huy Hoàng
- Flag bearer (closing): volunteer
- Medals: Gold 0 Silver 0 Bronze 0 Total 0

Summer Olympics appearances (overview)
- 1952; 1956; 1960; 1964; 1968; 1972; 1976; 1980; 1984; 1988; 1992; 1996; 2000; 2004; 2008; 2012; 2016; 2020; 2024

Vietnam competed at the 2020 Summer Olympics in Tokyo. Originally scheduled to take place from 24 July to 9 August 2020, the Games were postponed to 23 July to 8 August 2021, due to the COVID-19 pandemic. It was the nation's tenth appearance at the Olympics as a reunified republic, six of which under the banner of the State of Vietnam or South Vietnam. The delegation finished without a medal for the first time since 2004 Summer Olympics.

== Competitors ==
The following is the list of number of competitors in the Games.

Sport	Men	Women	Total
Archery	1	1	2
Athletics	0	1	1
Badminton	1	1	2
Boxing	1	1	2
Gymnastics	2	0	2
Judo	0	1	1
Rowing	0	2	2
Shooting	1	0	1
Swimming	1	1	2
Taekwondo	0	1	1
Weightlifting	1	1	2
Total	8	10	18

== Archery ==
Two Vietnamese archers qualified for the men's and women's individual recurve, respectively, at the Games, by reaching the semifinal stage and obtaining one of three available spots each at the 2019 Asian Championships in Bangkok, Thailand.

Athlete	Event	Ranking round		Round of 64	Round of 32	Round of 16	Quarterfinals	Semifinals	Final / BM	
Athlete	Event	Score	Seed	Opposition Score	Opposition Score	Opposition Score	Opposition Score	Opposition Score	Opposition Score	Rank
Nguyễn Hoàng Phi Vũ	Men's individual	647	53	Tang C-c (TPE); L 1–7	Did not advance					
Đỗ Thị Ánh Nguyệt	Women's individual	628	49	Hayakawa (JPN); L 5–6	Did not advance					
Nguyễn Hoàng Phi Vũ; Đỗ Thị Ánh Nguyệt	Mixed team	1275	23	—N/a		did not advance				

== Athletics ==
Vietnam received a universality slot from the World Athletics to send a female track and field athlete to the Olympics.

Key

- Note–Ranks given for track events are within the athlete's heat only
- Q = Qualified for the next round
- q = Qualified for the next round as a fastest loser or, in field events, by position without achieving the qualifying target
- NR = National record
- N/A = Round not applicable for the event
- Bye = Athlete not required to compete in round

Track & road events

Athlete	Event	Heat		Semifinal		Final	
Athlete	Event	Result	Rank	Result	Rank	Result	Rank
Quách Thị Lan	Women's 400 m hurdles	55.71	4 Q	56.78	6	Did not advance	

== Badminton ==
Vietnam entered two badminton players for each of the following events into the Olympic tournament based on the BWF Race to Tokyo Rankings.

Athlete	Event	Group stage				Elimination	Quarterfinal	Semifinal	Final / BM	
Athlete	Event	Opposition Score	Opposition Score	Opposition Score	Rank	Opposition Score	Opposition Score	Opposition Score	Opposition Score	Rank
Nguyễn Tiến Minh	Men's singles	Antonsen (DEN); L (13–21, 13–21)	Dwicahyo (AZE); L (14–21, 18–21)	—N/a	3	Did not advance				
Nguyễn Thùy Linh	Women's singles	Qi (FRA); W (21–11, 21–11)	Tai T-y (TPE); L (16–21, 11–21)	Jaquet (SUI); W (21–8, 21–17)	2	Did not advance				

== Boxing ==
Vietnam entered two boxer into the Olympic tournament for the first time since Seoul 1988. 2019 Southeast Asian Games silver medalist Nguyễn Văn Đương scored an outright quarterfinal victory to secure a spot in the men's featherweight division at the 2020 Asia & Oceania Qualification Tournament in Amman, Jordan, while Nguyễn Thị Tâm replacing the North Korean slots after withdrawn from the Olympics.

Athlete	Event	Round of 32	Round of 16	Quarterfinals	Semifinals	Final	
Athlete	Event	Opposition Result	Opposition Result	Opposition Result	Opposition Result	Opposition Result	Rank
Nguyễn Văn Đương	Men's featherweight	Aliyev (AZE); W 3–2	Erdenebat (MGL); L 0–5	Did not advance			
Nguyễn Thị Tâm	Women's flyweight	Krasteva (BUL); L 2–3	Did not advance				

== Gymnastics ==
=== Artistic ===
Vietnam entered one artistic gymnast into the Olympic competition. Lê Thanh Tùng secured one of the three spots available for individual-based gymnasts, neither part of the team nor qualified through the all-around, in the vault exercise at the 2019 World Championships in Stuttgart, Germany.

2021 Asian Championships in Hangzhou, China did not take place, so Đinh Phương Thành is the next highest ranked eligible All-Around athlete based on the All-Around results from Qualifications of the 2019 World Championships, will be earned 1 quota place.

Men

Athlete	Event	Qualification								Final							
Athlete	Event	Apparatus						Total	Rank	Apparatus						Total	Rank
Athlete	Event	F	PH	R	V	PB	HB	Total	Rank	F	PH	R	V	PB	HB	Total	Rank
Lê Thanh Tùng	Vault	—N/a			13.483	—N/a		13.483	19	Did not advance							
Lê Thanh Tùng	Horizontal bar	—N/a					13.166	13.166	39	Did not advance							
Đinh Phương Thành	Parallel bars	—N/a				11.833	—N/a	11.833	43	Did not advance							

== Judo ==
Vietnam entered one female judoka into the Olympic tournament with reallocated continental quota.

Athlete	Event	Round of 32	Round of 16	Quarterfinals	Semifinals	Repechage	Final / BM	
Athlete	Event	Opposition Result	Opposition Result	Opposition Result	Opposition Result	Opposition Result	Opposition Result	Rank
Nguyễn Thị Thanh Thủy	Women's –52 kg	Chițu (ROU); L 00–10	Did not advance					

== Rowing ==
Vietnam qualified one boat in the women's lightweight double sculls for the Games by winning the silver medal and securing the second of three berths available at the 2021 FISA Asia & Oceania Olympic Qualification Regatta in Tokyo, Japan.

Athlete	Event	Heats		Repechage		Semifinals		Final	
Athlete	Event	Time	Rank	Time	Rank	Time	Rank	Time	Rank
Đinh Thị Hảo; Lường Thị Thảo	Women's lightweight double sculls	7:36.21	4 R	7:53.69	5 FC	Bye		7:19.05	15

Qualification Legend: FA=Final A (medal); FB=Final B (non-medal); FC=Final C (non-medal); FD=Final D (non-medal); FE=Final E (non-medal); FF=Final F (non-medal); SA/B=Semifinals A/B; SC/D=Semifinals C/D; SE/F=Semifinals E/F; QF=Quarterfinals; R=Repechage

== Shooting ==
Vietnam entered one shooter at the games, after getting the allocation quotas.

Athlete	Event	Qualification		Final	
Athlete	Event	Points	Rank	Points	Rank
Hoàng Xuân Vinh	Men's 10 m air pistol	573	22	Did not advance	

== Swimming ==
Vietnamese swimmers further achieved qualifying standards in the following events (up to a maximum of 2 swimmers in each event at the Olympic Qualifying Time (OQT), and potentially 1 at the Olympic Selection Time (OST)):

Athlete	Event	Heat		Semifinal		Final	
Athlete	Event	Time	Rank	Time	Rank	Time	Rank
Nguyễn Huy Hoàng	Men's 800 m freestyle	7:54.16	20	—N/a		Did not advance	
Nguyễn Huy Hoàng	Men's 1500 m freestyle	15:00.24	12	—N/a		Did not advance	
Nguyễn Thị Ánh Viên	Women's 200 m freestyle	2:05.30	26	Did not advance			
Nguyễn Thị Ánh Viên	Women's 800 m freestyle	9:03.56	30	—N/a		Did not advance	

== Taekwondo ==
Vietnam entered one athlete into the taekwondo competition at the Games. Trương Thị Kim Tuyến secured a spot in the women's flyweight category (49 kg) with a top two finish at the 2021 Asian Qualification Tournament in Amman, Jordan.

Athlete	Event	Round of 16	Quarterfinals	Semifinals	Repechage	Final / BM	
Athlete	Event	Opposition Result	Opposition Result	Opposition Result	Opposition Result	Opposition Result	Rank
Trương Thị Kim Tuyền	Women's −49 kg	Yong (CAN); W 19–5	Wongpattanakit (THA); L 11–20	Did not advance	Avishag (ISR); L 1–22 PTG	Did not advance	7

== Weightlifting ==
Vietnamese weightlifters qualified for three quota places at the games, based on the Tokyo 2020 Rankings Qualification List of 11 June 2021. They lost one of its three berths at the coming Olympics due to previous doping violations. The International Testing Agency has forced the country to remove one female berth as punishment after four of the country’s athletes tested positive for banned drugs in 2019 and 2020.

Athlete	Event	Snatch		Clean & jerk		Total	Rank
Athlete	Event	Result	Rank	Result	Rank	Total	Rank
Thạch Kim Tuấn	Men's −61 kg	126	8	~~153~~	DNF	126	DNF
Hoàng Thị Duyên	Women's –59 kg	95	5	113	7	208	5

== See also ==
- Vietnam at the 2020 Summer Paralympics
