= Trương Ngọc Để =

Vietnamese Taekwondo

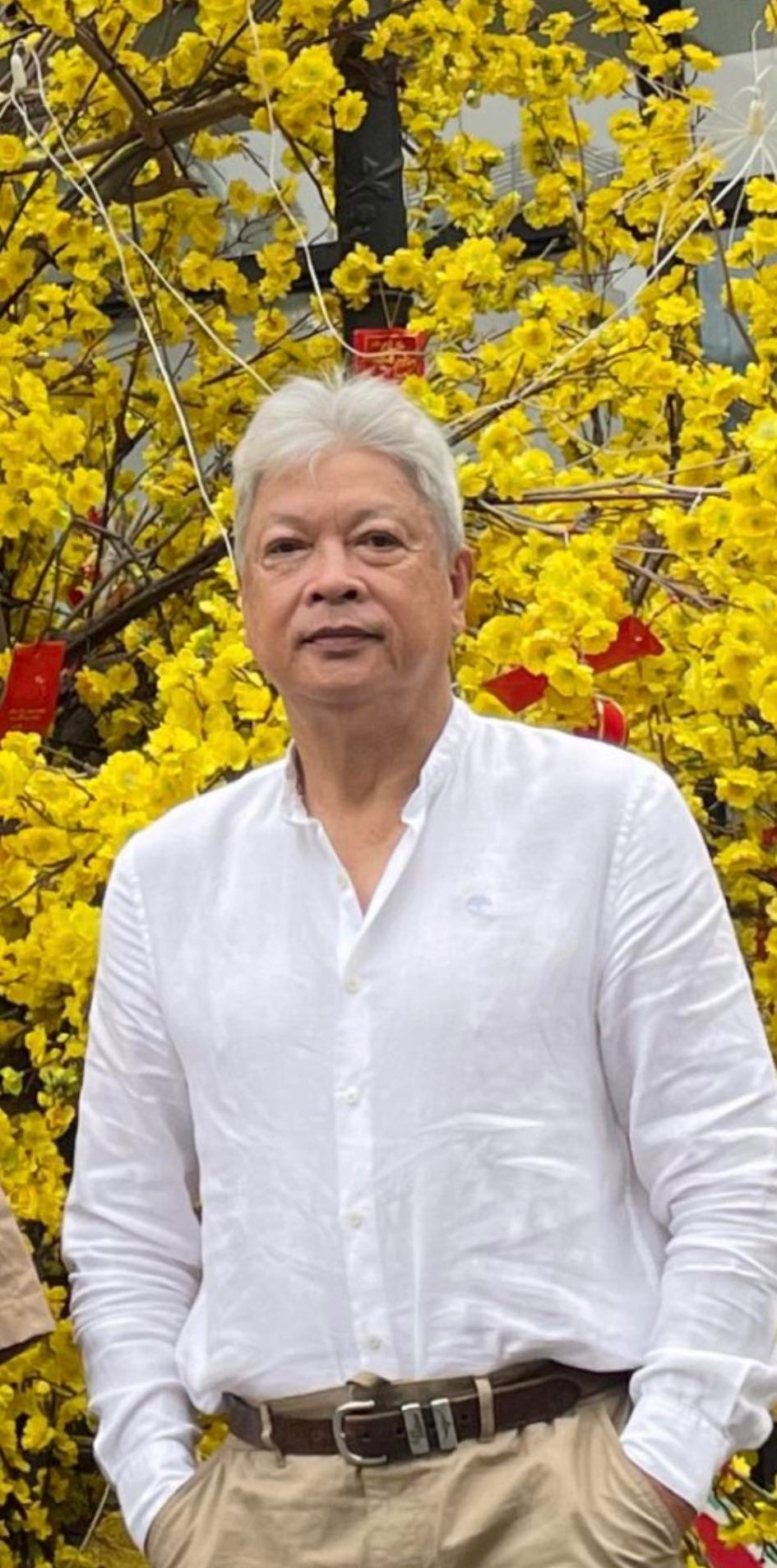
- Trương Ngọc Để

Personal information
- Nationality: Vietnam
- Born: Trương Ngọc Để; 5 March 1957 (age 69) Cambodia
- Occupation: Athletes Taekwondo

Sport
- Sport: Taekwondo

Trương Ngọc Để (born 5 March 1957) is a Vietnamese Taekwondo athlete, martial arts instructor. He is currently the president of the Vietnam Taekwondo Federation. He holds a ninth-degree black belt (9th dan) certification from the World Taekwondo Academy (Kukkiwon) and is, to date, the only Vietnamese martial arts instructor to have received this Kukkiwon certification.

== Biography ==
Martial arts instructor Trương Ngọc Để has contributed to and helped develop the martial arts movement in Ho Chi Minh City, making it a leading center for several martial arts in the country, including Judo, Karate, Vovinam, and Vietnamese traditional martial arts.

In 1996, Trương Ngọc Để became Vice President and Secretary-General of the Vietnam Taekwondo Federation. In 2004, he became Director of the Ho Chi Minh City Martial Arts Training Center. From 2006, he served as Principal of the Ho Chi Minh City School of Sports and Physical Education. In 2008, he became Deputy Head of Competition Organization of the World Taekwondo Federation (WTF). From 2007 to 2013, he served as Vice President and Secretary-General of the Vietnam Taekwondo Federation.

== Career ==
Trương Ngọc Để served as President of the Vietnam Taekwondo Federation during its fourth term (2013–2017) and fifth term (2017–2021). He became the longest-serving president in the history of the Vietnam Taekwondo Federation after continuing to serve as President for the sixth term (2022–2026). Trương Ngọc Để is also the only martial arts instructor in Vietnam to hold a ninth-degree black belt (9th dan) from the World Taekwondo Academy (Kukkiwon).
