= Vietnam at the 2008 Summer Olympics =

- IOC code: VIE
- NOC: Vietnam Olympic Committee
- Website: www.voc.org.vn (in Vietnamese and English)

in Beijing
- Competitors: 13 in 8 sports
- Flag bearers: Nguyễn Đình Cương (opening); Nguyễn Văn Hùng (closing)
- Medals Ranked 70th: Gold 0 Silver 1 Bronze 0 Total 1

Summer Olympics appearances (overview)
- 1952; 1956; 1960; 1964; 1968; 1972; 1976; 1980; 1984; 1988; 1992; 1996; 2000; 2004; 2008; 2012; 2016; 2020; 2024

Vietnam competed at the 2008 Summer Olympics in Beijing. It is the 13th summer games in which the nation has competed since its first appearance in 1952. Although it has sent a modest delegation every year it has competed, Vietnam had only earned one Olympic medal before Beijing (in 2000). The Vietnam Olympic Committee sent thirteen athletes to compete in eight of the 28 Olympic sports. It is the largest ever contingent for the nation, up from 11 in the 2004 games.

== Medalists ==
Medal	Name	Sport	Event	Date
Silver	Hoàng Anh Tuấn	Weightlifting	Men's 56 kg	August 10

== Athletics ==
Two athletes represented Vietnam in Beijing.

Key

- Note–Ranks given for track events are within the athlete's heat only
- Q = Qualified for the next round
- q = Qualified for the next round as a fastest loser or, in field events, by position without achieving the qualifying target
- NR = National record
- N/A = Round not applicable for the event
- Bye = Athlete not required to compete in round

Men

Athlete	Event	Heat		Semifinal		Final	
Athlete	Event	Result	Rank	Result	Rank	Result	Rank
Nguyễn Đình Cương	800 m	1:52.06	7	Did not advance			

Women

Athlete	Event	Heat		Quarterfinal		Semifinal		Final	
Athlete	Event	Result	Rank	Result	Rank	Result	Rank	Result	Rank
Vũ Thị Hương	100 m	11.65	3 Q	11.70	8	Did not advance			

== Badminton ==
Vietnam sent two athletes to compete in two of the five badminton events. Nguyễn Tiến Minh entered ranked 24th in the world, while Lê Ngọc Nguyên Nhung was ranked 72nd.

Athlete	Event	Round of 64	Round of 32	Round of 16	Quarterfinal	Semifinal	Final / BM	
Athlete	Event	Opposition Score	Opposition Score	Opposition Score	Opposition Score	Opposition Score	Opposition Score	Rank
Nguyễn Tiến Minh	Men's singles	Bye	Hsieh Y-H (TPE); L 16–21, 21–15, 15–21	Did not advance				
Lê Ngọc Nguyên Nhung	Women's singles	Jayasinghe (SRI); W 21–13, 21–12	Hirose (JPN); L 7–21, 12–21	Did not advance				

== Gymnastics ==
=== Artistic ===
Đỗ Thị Ngân Thương represented Vietnam in artistic gymnastics, becoming the first Vietnamese gymnast to be selected for Olympic competition. Although she did not qualify individually, she received a wild card invitation from the International Olympic Committee. She competed in the qualification stage, where her 52.1 final score placed her in 59th overall, missing the event and all-around competition finals. On 15 August 2008, Thuong failed a drugs test for furosemide and her result was disqualified. IOC professor Arne Ljungqvist suggested Thuong's drug use was due to "poor information of the athlete", rather than a deliberate attempt to violate the rules.

Women

Athlete	Event	Qualification						Final					
Athlete	Event	Apparatus				Total	Rank	Apparatus				Total	Rank
Athlete	Event	F	V	UB	BB	Total	Rank	F	V	UB	BB	Total	Rank
Đỗ Thị Ngân Thương	All-around	11.900	13.400	12.575	14.225	~~52.100~~	DSQ	Did not advance					

== Shooting ==
One athlete qualified to compete in two shooting events. Nguyễn Mạnh Tường failed to advance in either the 10 metre or 50 metre pistol events.

Men

Athlete	Event	Qualification		Final	
Athlete	Event	Points	Rank	Points	Rank
Nguyễn Mạnh Tường	10 m air pistol	572	34	Did not advance	
Nguyễn Mạnh Tường	50 m pistol	543	38	Did not advance	

== Swimming ==
One athlete qualified to compete in swimming at the Games, finishing 58th and failing to advance.

Men

Athlete	Event	Heat		Semifinal		Final	
Athlete	Event	Time	Rank	Time	Rank	Time	Rank
Nguyễn Hữu Việt	100 m breaststroke	1:06.36	58	Did not advance			

== Table tennis ==
One athlete competed for Vietnam in the men's table tennis singles tournament. Đoàn Kiến Quốc won his first two matches, but lost in the second round to a Russian opponent.

Athlete	Event	Preliminary round	Round 1	Round 2	Round 3	Quarterfinals	Semifinals	Final / BM		
Athlete	Event	Opposition Result	Opposition Result	Opposition Result	Opposition Result	Opposition Result	Opposition Result	Opposition Result	Opposition Result	Rank
Đoàn Kiến Quốc	Men's singles	Zalcberg (AUS); W 4–0	Legoût (FRA); W 4–2	Smirnov (RUS); L 1–4	Did not advance					

== Taekwondo ==
Vietnam sent three athletes to compete in three taekwondo events at these Games. The team had an overall record of 1–3, with only Trần Thị Ngọc Trúc managing to win a match. Trần qualified for the repechage after her second round opponent made the final, but could not advance to a bronze medal match.

Athlete	Event	Round of 16	Quarterfinals	Semifinals	Repechage	Bronze Medal	Final	
Athlete	Event	Opposition Result	Opposition Result	Opposition Result	Opposition Result	Opposition Result	Opposition Result	Rank
Nguyễn Văn Hùng	Men's +80 kg	Chukwumerije (NGR); L 1–3	Did not advance					
Trần Thị Ngọc Trúc	Women's −49 kg	Tona (PNG); W 5–0	Puedpong (THA); L 1–2	Did not advance	Montejo (CUB); L 0–4	Did not advance		
Nguyễn Thị Hoài Thu	Women's −57 kg	Diedhiou (SEN); L 0–1	Did not advance					

== Weightlifting ==
Two athletes competed in two weightlifting events at the games. Hoàng Anh Tuấn was ranked fifth in the world in his category and was called Vietnam's best chance at a medal in the Games. This turned out to be an accurate assessment, as he lifted 130 kilograms in the snatch leaving him tied in lift weight for 2nd, but losing a tie on body weight. In the clean and jerk, Hoàng made his first lift at 155 kilos, but missed his second attempt at 160 and fell back to 4th. However, on his final lift he was successful at 160 kilograms, while his opponents in the battle for the silver medal all missed at that weight or selected a lower weight to attempt, moving him into second place by two kilograms. This was just the second Olympic medal in Vietnamese history, and the first in weightlifting.

Athlete	Event	Snatch		Clean & Jerk		Total	Rank
Athlete	Event	Result	Rank	Result	Rank	Total	Rank
Hoàng Anh Tuấn	Men's −56 kg	130	3	160	2	290	2nd place, silver medalist(s)
Nguyễn Thị Thiết	Women's −63 kg	100	7	125	6	225	4

== See also ==
- Vietnam at the 2008 Summer Paralympics
