= Trương Ngọc Tơn =

Vietnamese swimmer (born 1960)

Personal information
- Born: 3 February 1960 (age 66)

Sport
- Sport: Swimming

Trương Ngọc Tơn (born 3 February 1960) is a Vietnamese former swimmer. He competed in two events at the 1980 Summer Olympics. He is from Thái Bình Province.
