= Nguyễn Văn Khoi =

Vietnamese cyclist

Personal information
- Born: 1935 (age 90–91)

Cycling career
- Sport: Cycling

Nguyễn Văn Khoi (born 1935) is a former Vietnamese cyclist. He competed in the individual road race and team time trial events at the 1964 Summer Olympics.
