= Vietnam at the 2004 Summer Olympics =

- IOC code: VIE
- NOC: Vietnam Olympic Committee
- Website: www.voc.org.vn (in Vietnamese and English)

in Athens
- Competitors: 11 in 8 sports
- Flag bearer: Bùi Thị Nhung
- Medals: Gold 0 Silver 0 Bronze 0 Total 0

Summer Olympics appearances (overview)
- 1952; 1956; 1960; 1964; 1968; 1972; 1976; 1980; 1984; 1988; 1992; 1996; 2000; 2004; 2008; 2012; 2016; 2020; 2024

Vietnam competed at the 2004 Summer Olympics in Athens, Greece from 13 to 29 August 2004.

== Athletics ==
Vietnamese athletes have so far achieved qualifying standards in the following athletics events (up to a maximum of 3 athletes in each event at the 'A' Standard, and 1 at the 'B' Standard).

Key

- Note–Ranks given for track events are within the athlete's heat only
- Q = Qualified for the next round
- q = Qualified for the next round as a fastest loser or, in field events, by position without achieving the qualifying target
- NR = National record
- N/A = Round not applicable for the event
- Bye = Athlete not required to compete in round

Men

Athlete	Event	Heat		Semifinal		Final	
Athlete	Event	Result	Rank	Result	Rank	Result	Rank
Lê Văn Dương	800 m	1:49.81 NR	8	Did not advance			

Women

Athlete	Event	Qualification		Final	
Athlete	Event	Distance	Position	Distance	Position
Bùi Thị Nhung	High jump	1.80	33	Did not advance	

== Canoeing ==
=== Sprint ===
Athlete	Event	Heats		Semifinals		Final	
Athlete	Event	Time	Rank	Time	Rank	Time	Rank
Đoàn Thị Cách	Women's K-1 500 m	2:06.126	7 q	2:06.692	8	Did not advance	

Qualification Legend: Q = Qualify to final; q = Qualify to semifinal

== Rowing ==
Women

Athlete	Event	Heats		Repechage		Semifinals		Final	
Athlete	Event	Time	Rank	Time	Rank	Time	Rank	Time	Rank
Phạm Thị Hiền; Nguyễn Thị Thị	Lightweight double sculls	7:42.43	6 R	7:35.29	5 FC	Bye		8:14.80	18

Qualification Legend: FA=Final A (medal); FB=Final B (non-medal); FC=Final C (non-medal); FD=Final D (non-medal); FE=Final E (non-medal); FF=Final F (non-medal); SA/B=Semifinals A/B; SC/D=Semifinals C/D; SE/F=Semifinals E/F; R=Repechage

== Shooting ==
Men

Athlete	Event	Qualification		Final	
Athlete	Event	Points	Rank	Points	Rank
Nguyễn Mạnh Tường	10 m air pistol	568	41	Did not advance	

== Swimming ==
Men

Athlete	Event	Heat		Semifinal		Final	
Athlete	Event	Time	Rank	Time	Rank	Time	Rank
Nguyễn Hữu Việt	100 m breaststroke	1:06.70	52	Did not advance			

== Table tennis ==
Men

Athlete	Event	Round 1	Round 2	Round 3	Round 4	Quarterfinals	Semifinals	Final / BM	
Athlete	Event	Opposition Result	Opposition Result	Opposition Result	Opposition Result	Opposition Result	Opposition Result	Opposition Result	Rank
Đoàn Kiến Quốc	Men's singles	Yang (ITA); L 1–4	Did not advance						

== Taekwondo ==
Vietnam has qualified two taekwondo practitioners in their respective divisions.

Athlete	Event	Round of 16	Quarterfinals	Semifinals	Repechage 1	Repechage 2	Final / BM	
Athlete	Event	Opposition Result	Opposition Result	Opposition Result	Opposition Result	Opposition Result	Opposition Result	Rank
Nguyễn Quốc Huân	Men's −58 kg	Magomedov (RUS); W 12–10	Green (GBR); W 4–2	Salazar (MEX); L 0–8	Bye	Ramos (ESP); L 0–8	Did not advance	5
Nguyễn Văn Hùng	Men's +80 kg	Heino (FIN); W 8–5	Kamal (JOR); L 2–4	Did not advance				

== Weightlifting ==
Vietnam has qualified a single weightlifter.

Athlete	Event	Snatch		Clean & Jerk		Total	Rank
Athlete	Event	Result	Rank	Result	Rank	Total	Rank
Nguyễn Thị Thiết	Women's −63 kg	95	=5	110	7	205	6

== See also ==
- Vietnam at the 2002 Asian Games
- Vietnam at the 2004 Summer Paralympics
- Vietnam at the 2006 Asian Games
