= Lajos Nagy (water polo) =

German water polo player

Personal information
- Nationality: German
- Born: 11 March 1936 (age 89); Budapest, Hungary

Sport
- Sport: Water polo

Lajos Nagy (born 11 March 1936) is a German water polo player. He competed at the 1960 Summer Olympics and the 1968 Summer Olympics.
