= Ngô Hữu Kính =

Vietnamese sports shooter

Personal information
- Nationality: Vietnamese
- Born: 16 April 1951 (age 73)

Sport
- Sport: Sports shooting

Ngô Hữu Kính (born 16 April 1951) is a Vietnamese sports shooter. He competed in the mixed 50 metre free pistol event at the 1980 Summer Olympics.
