= Lajos Nagy (sport shooter) =

Hungarian sports shooter

Personal information
- Nationality: Hungarian
- Born: 5 January 1945 (age 80); Vámospércs, Hungary

Sport
- Sport: Sports shooting

Lajos Nagy (born 5 January 1945) is a Hungarian sports shooter. He competed in the mixed 50 metre free pistol event at the 1980 Summer Olympics.
