= Vietnam at the 2016 Summer Olympics =

- IOC code: VIE
- NOC: Vietnam Olympic Committee
- Website: voc.org.vn/en-us/home

in Rio de Janeiro
- Competitors: 23 in 10 sports
- Flag bearer: Vũ Thành An
- Medals Ranked 48th: Gold 1 Silver 1 Bronze 0 Total 2

Summer Olympics appearances (overview)
- 1952; 1956; 1960; 1964; 1968; 1972; 1976; 1980; 1984; 1988; 1992; 1996; 2000; 2004; 2008; 2012; 2016; 2020; 2024

Vietnam competed at the 2016 Summer Olympics in Rio de Janeiro, Brazil, from 5 to 21 August 2016. It marked the nation's ninth Olympic appearance, having notably skipped the 1984 Summer Olympics in Los Angeles due to the Soviet-led boycott. The Vietnam Olympic Committee (VOC) dispatched its largest delegation to a non-boycotting Olympic Games, with 23 athletes competing in 10 sports in Rio de Janeiro. Wrestler Vũ Thị Hằng withdrew due to injury a day before her match, reducing the number of competitors to 22. Badminton player Nguyễn Tiến Minh became the first sportsman to represent Vietnam in the Olympics three times in a row. Fencer Vũ Thành An was chosen by the committee to be Vietnam's flag bearer at the opening ceremony.

Vietnam concluded the Games with two medals, achieving the target set by the VOC. Shooter Hoàng Xuân Vinh made history on 6 August 2016, by claiming the nation's first-ever gold medal in the men's 10 m air pistol. Four days later, on 10 August, he won a silver medal in the 50 m pistol, emerging as Vietnam's most decorated Olympic athlete. Despite not winning a medal, Văn Ngọc Tú secured a historic first victory for a Vietnamese judoka in the women's 48 kg category, while Đỗ Thị Anh also scored the first winning match for a Vietnamese fencer. Nguyễn Thị Ánh Viên attended three events, the most for any Vietnamese competitors, and broke her own national record in the women's 400-meter individual medley. With its two medals, Vietnam ranked 48th on the medal table, tying with Bahrain.

== Medalist ==
List of medalists, with the sport, event, and date of their achievement
Medal	Name	Sport	Event	Date
Gold	Hoàng Xuân Vinh	Shooting	Men's 10 m air pistol	6 August
Silver	Hoàng Xuân Vinh	Shooting	Men's 50 m pistol	10 August

== Background ==
Vietnam first participated in the Summer Olympics in 1980 in Moscow, following the nation's reunification. Prior to this, the State of Vietnam had competed on six Olympic Games, starting in 1952. The Vietnam Olympic Committee (VOC), established on 20 December 1976, received recognition from the International Olympic Committee (IOC) shortly thereafter. The 1980 delegation comprised 30 individuals competing in four sports. The nation skipped the 1984 Summer Olympics in Los Angeles due to the Soviet boycott. Almost two decades later, Vietnam secured its first Olympic medals with two silver medals at the 2000 Sydney Olympics in taekwondo and the 2008 Beijing Olympics in weightlifting, respectively. Vietnam earned its first bronze medal in weightlifting at the London 2012 Olympics after a disqualification in the men's 56 kg event resulted in the medal being awarded to Trần Lê Quốc Toàn.

The VOC initially dispatched its largest delegation to the Olympic Games, with 23 athletes (10 men and 13 women) competing in 10 sports at the 2016 Summer Olympics. However, wrestler Vũ Thị Hằng withdrew due to injury a day before her match, reducing the number of competitors to 22. This still surpassed their previous record of 18 athletes at the 2012 London Games. For the second consecutive time, the Vietnamese team included more female athletes than males. The fencing and weightlifting teams comprised four members each, the highest number for any sport in the 2016 delegation. The VOC aimed to secure two medals, and chose fencer Vũ Thành An to bear the flag in the parade of nations at the opening ceremony.

List of number of Vietnamese competitors in the Games
Sport	Men	Women	Total
Athletics	1	1	2
Badminton	1	1	2
Fencing	1	3	4
Gymnastics	1	1	2
Judo	0	1	1
Rowing	0	2	2
Shooting	2	0	2
Swimming	1	1	2
Weightlifting	3	1	4
Wrestling	0	1	2
Total	10	12	22

== Athletics ==
In athletics, Vietnam was represented by Nguyễn Thành Ngưng and Nguyễn Thị Huyền. Ngưng was chosen based on his record-breaking result at the Asian Race Walking Championships in March 2016, while Huyền's performance in June 2015 at the Southeast Asian Games met the criteria for both the 2015 World Championships and 2016 Summer Olympics. Ngưng and Huyền both made their Olympic debuts and were the only qualified athletes from Southeast Asia by the International Association of Athletics Federations. Ngưng participated on 12 August in the men's 20 km walk event, finishing 60th out of 63rd competitors on a route along Pontal and failing to advance to the quarterfinals. The following day, Huyền took part in the women's 400 m event at the Estádio Olímpico Nilton Santos, where she finished in sixth with 52.97 seconds. On 15 August, she ran her heats in 57.87 seconds and finished at the penultimate position in the women's 400 m hurdles event, only ahead of Natalya Asanova from Uzbekistan.

List of track & road events for Vietnamese competitors
Athlete	Event	Heat		Semifinal		Final	
Athlete	Event	Result	Rank	Result	Rank	Result	Rank
Nguyễn Thành Ngưng	Men's 20 km walk	—N/a				1:30:01	60
Nguyễn Thị Huyền	Women's 400 m	52.97	6	Did not advance			
Nguyễn Thị Huyền	Women's 400 m hurdles	57.87	7	Did not advance			
Ranks given for track events are within the athlete's heat only "N/A" = Round not applicable for the event

== Badminton ==
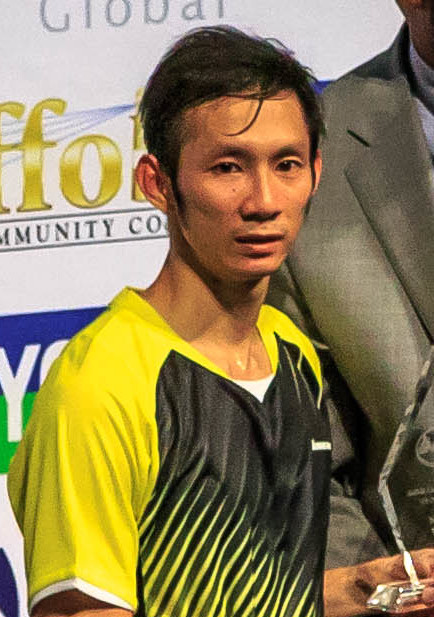
Nguyễn Tiến Minh (pictured in 2014) became the first sportsman to represent Vietnam in the Olympics three times in a row

Vietnam had two qualified badminton players, Nguyễn Tiến Minh and Vũ Thị Trang, for the following events in the Olympic tournament. They were selected among the top 34 individual shuttlers each in the men's and women's singles based on the Badminton World Federation World Rankings as of 5 May 2016. Their ranks were boosted by the performances in March at the 2016 New Zealand Open Grand Prix Gold, where Minh ended up at the semifinals. The 2016 Summer Games marked Trang's first and Minh's third time competing, making Minh the first-ever sportsman to represent Vietnam in three consecutive Olympics. In an interview before the Games, Minh said: "It is my third time so the happiness is multiplied three times... I am confident that my technique has improved a lot." Minh was responsible for directing and supporting Trang's matches, as the badminton players went to Rio de Janeiro without any coaches.

Trang first competed on 12 August, when she played against Nozomi Okuhara of Japan in the women's singles event. She ultimately lost to Okuhara after the two-game match, with the score of 2–0 (10–21, 8–21). She went on to win over Lindaweni Fanetri of Indonesia two days later, with the score of 2–0 (21–12, 21–11). Despite finishing in second in the Group J and failing to advance to the Round of 16, Trang still fulfilled her personal goal of getting a winning match. Minh competed in the Group E in the men's singles events, starting with the three-game match against Russia's Vladimir Malkov on 11 August. Minh won the match with the score of 2–1 (15–21, 21–9, 21–13). He scored his second win in the match against Austria's David Obernosterer the following day, with the result of 2-0 (21–18, 21–14). In the final group match on 14 August, Minh played against Lin Dan of China, who had won six previous contests with Minh. Lin ultimately won the match with the score of 2–0 (7–21, 12–21). Despite considering the 2016 Summer Games as his final time at the Olympics, Minh was still chosen to compete in 2021. Minh and Trang were the only couple in Vietnamese sports to compete together at the same Summer Olympics. They married in Ho Chi Minh City in December 2016, shortly after their participation at the Games.

List of badminton events for Vietnamese competitors
Athlete	Event	Group Stage				Elimination	Quarterfinal	Semifinal	Final / BM	
Athlete	Event	Opposition Score	Opposition Score	Opposition Score	Rank	Opposition Score	Opposition Score	Opposition Score	Opposition Score	Rank
Nguyễn Tiến Minh	Men's singles	Malkov (RUS); W (15–21, 21–9, 21–13)	Obernosterer (AUT); W (21–18, 21–14)	Lin D (CHN); L (7–21, 12–21)	2	Did not advance				
Vũ Thị Trang	Women's singles	Okuhara (JPN); L (10–21, 8–21)	Fanetri (INA); W (21–12, 21–11)	—N/a	2	Did not advance				
"N/A" = Round not applicable for the event

== Fencing ==
Vietnam entered four fencers into the Olympic competition, all of whom are members of the Hanoian Club. Vũ Thành An, Nguyễn Thị Như Hoa, and Nguyễn Thị Lệ Dung had claimed their Olympic spots with the winning performances at the Asia and Oceania Zonal Qualifier, which took place in Wuxi in April 2016. In the women's foil category, Đỗ Thị Anh lost the final match to New Zealand's Yuan Ping, who was later ruled ineligible to compete because she played under the Chinese jersey. Thị Anh was subsequently selected to replace Ping, as the next highest-ranked fencer, for the Games by the International Fencing Federation in June.

Hoa was the first member to compete in the women's épée event on 6 August, where she lost the match to Auriane Mallo of France with the score of 7–15 and finished last on the final ranking. Hoa was unsatisfied with the result, citing that she did not have enough time to warm up prior to the match. Two days later, Dung was also lost at her only match against Kim Ji-yeon of South Korea on the women's sabre event, with the score of 3–15. Thị Anh competed in the women's foil events on 10 August, starting with the winning match against Aikaterini Kontochristopoulou from Greece with the score of 15–13. It was the first winning match for a Vietnamese fencer at the Olympics. The fencer lost her second match to Italy's Arianna Errigo with a score of 9–15, finishing 32nd out of 35th competitors on the final ranking. That same day, Thành An also took part in the men's sabre events, where he won his first match against the 2012 Olympic silver medallist Diego Occhiuzzi of Italy with a score of 15–12. He lost in his final match with Vincent Anstett from France, with a score of 8–15, and ended up at the 15th position on the final ranking. The fencer attributed his loss to his slow adaptation in changing his playing style, which prevented him from effectively countering his French opponent's strategy.

List of fencing events for Vietnamese competitors
Athlete	Event	Round of 64	Round of 32	Round of 16	Quarterfinal	Semifinal	Final / BM	
Athlete	Event	Opposition Score	Opposition Score	Opposition Score	Opposition Score	Opposition Score	Opposition Score	Rank
Vũ Thành An	Men's sabre	—N/a	Occhiuzzi (ITA); W 15–12	Anstett (FRA); L 8–15	Did not advance			
Nguyễn Thị Như Hoa	Women's épée	Mallo (FRA); L 7–15	Did not advance					
Đỗ Thị Anh	Women's foil	Kontochristopoulou (GRE); W 15–13	Errigo (ITA); L 9–15	Did not advance				
Nguyễn Thị Lệ Dung	Women's sabre	Bye	Kim J-y (KOR); L 3–15	Did not advance				
"N/A" = Round not applicable for the event; "Bye" = Athlete not required to compete in round

== Gymnastics (artistic) ==
Vietnam entered two artistic gymnasts into the Olympic competition, Phạm Phước Hưng and Phan Thị Hà Thanh. The gymnasts qualified based on the results of each in the men's and women's apparatus and all-around events, respectively, at the Olympic Test Event in Rio de Janeiro in April 2016. Hưng and Thanh had previously attended at the 2012 Summer Olympics. Prior to the 2016 Olympics, Hưng experienced a recurrent back and neck pain from an injury, while Thanh had also not recovered from her knee injury. "We are still very determined... We have high hopes for ourselves," Hưng said. Due to the injury, Hưng announced that he would not competing on the men's rings, a competition Hưng was well-trained, and solely focus on the men's parallel bars event instead. On 6 August, he took part in the men's artistic qualification where he gained a total score of 14.966, sharing the same score as Brinn Bevan of Great Britain. Hưng finished 28th out of 43rd competitors and failed to advance to the final round. The following day, Thanh competed in the women's artistic qualification, where she scored 14.233 points in vault and 13.800 points in balance beam, failing to make into the top eight competitors.

List of artistic gymnastics events for Vietnamese competitor (men)
Athlete	Event	Qualification								Final							
Athlete	Event	Apparatus						Total	Rank	Apparatus						Total	Rank
Athlete	Event	F	PH	R	V	PB	HB	Total	Rank	F	PH	R	V	PB	HB	Total	Rank
Phạm Phước Hưng	Parallel bars	—N/a				14.966	—N/a	14.966	28	Did not advance							
"N/A" = Round not applicable for the event

List of artistic gymnastics event for Vietnamese competitor (women)
Athlete	Event	Qualification						Final					
Athlete	Event	Apparatus				Total	Rank	Apparatus				Total	Rank
Athlete	Event	V	UB	BB	F	Total	Rank	V	UB	BB	F	Total	Rank
Phan Thị Hà Thanh	Vault	14.233	—N/a			14.233	17	Did not advance					
Phan Thị Hà Thanh	Balance beam	—N/a		13.800	—N/a	13.800	36	Did not advance					
"N/A" = Round not applicable for the event

== Judo ==
Văn Ngọc Tú was the only qualified judoka for Vietnam at the 2016 Games. She competed at the Olympics for the second consecutive time, the most for any Vietnamese judoka. She claimed her spot by being one of the highest-ranked judokas outside of the direct qualifying position in the International Judo Federation World Ranking List, which was announced on 30 May 2016. Despite having unsuccessfully qualifying competitions in the recent months, Tú still had stable cumulative points that helped her stay in the top 50 ranking. Because the designated team was limited, Tú went to the 2016 Games without her coach or expert and practiced by herself.

On 6 August, she competed against Valentina Moscatt of Italy in the women's extra-lightweight category –48 kg. In the four-minute match, neither of the judokas could score a point. Tú, who has fewer penalty points (shido) than Moscatt, was then announced as the winner by the referee. It was the first time a Vietnamese judoka has won a match at the Olympics. That same day, Tú was eliminated from the quarterfinal after losing in the match against South Korea's Jeong Bo-kyeong, who scored 102 points. After the Games, Tú earned a prize and a certificate by the Ministry of National Defense for her result as a military athlete. At the ceremony, she announced that it was her last time competing at the Olympics, saying "It was the most significant milestone of my career. An Olympic victory in Rio de Janeiro is what I wish for the most and it came true."

List of Judo events for Vietnamese competitor
Athlete	Event	Round of 32	Round of 16	Quarterfinals	Semifinals	Repechage	Final / BM	
Athlete	Event	Opposition Result	Opposition Result	Opposition Result	Opposition Result	Opposition Result	Opposition Result	Rank
Văn Ngọc Tú	Women's −48 kg	Moscatt (ITA); W 000–000 S	Jeong B-k (KOR); L 000–102	Did not advance				

== Rowing ==
After the Asia and Oceania Continental Qualification Regatta in Chungju in April 2016, Vietnam has three qualified rowers in two categories for the 2016 Games: Phạm Thị Huệ in the women's single sculls category; Phạm Thị Thảo and Tạ Thanh Huyền in the women's lightweight double sculls. However, because each country can only pick a maximum of one category, only Thảo and Huyền were chosen to represent Vietnam at the 2016 Olympics. Less than a month before the 2016 Games, Thảo abruptly withdrew from the team due to her suffering from a vertebra injury.

Huyền ended up teaming with Hồ Thị Lý in the women's lightweight double sculls events at the Rodrigo de Freitas Lagoon, starting with the 2000 m rowing regatta on 8 August. Huyền and Lý finished in the last place of the group, with a time of 7:29.91, despite being in the second place when they hit the first 500 m. The following day, the two went on to compete in the second group of competitors in the repechage, where they finished in fourth place with a time of 8:19.79, claiming their spots in the Semifinals C/D. In the semifinals on 11 August, they played in the first group of four and finished in third, only ahead of Yislena Hernández and Licet Hernández of Cuba, with a time of 8:18.47. The next day, Huyền and Lý were eligible for the finals in the Group C, competing for a spot between the 13th and 18th. The duo, however, chose to skip the competition after Huyền got a fever, finishing in 18th place on the final ranking.

List of rowing events for Vietnamese competitors
Athlete	Event	Heats		Repechage		Semifinals		Final	
Athlete	Event	Time	Rank	Time	Rank	Time	Rank	Time	Rank
Hồ Thị Lý; Tạ Thanh Huyền	Women's lightweight double sculls	7:29.91	5 R	8:19.79	4 SC/D	8:18.47	3 FC	DNS	18
FC = Final C (non-medal); SC/D = Semifinals C/D; R = Repechage

== Shooting ==
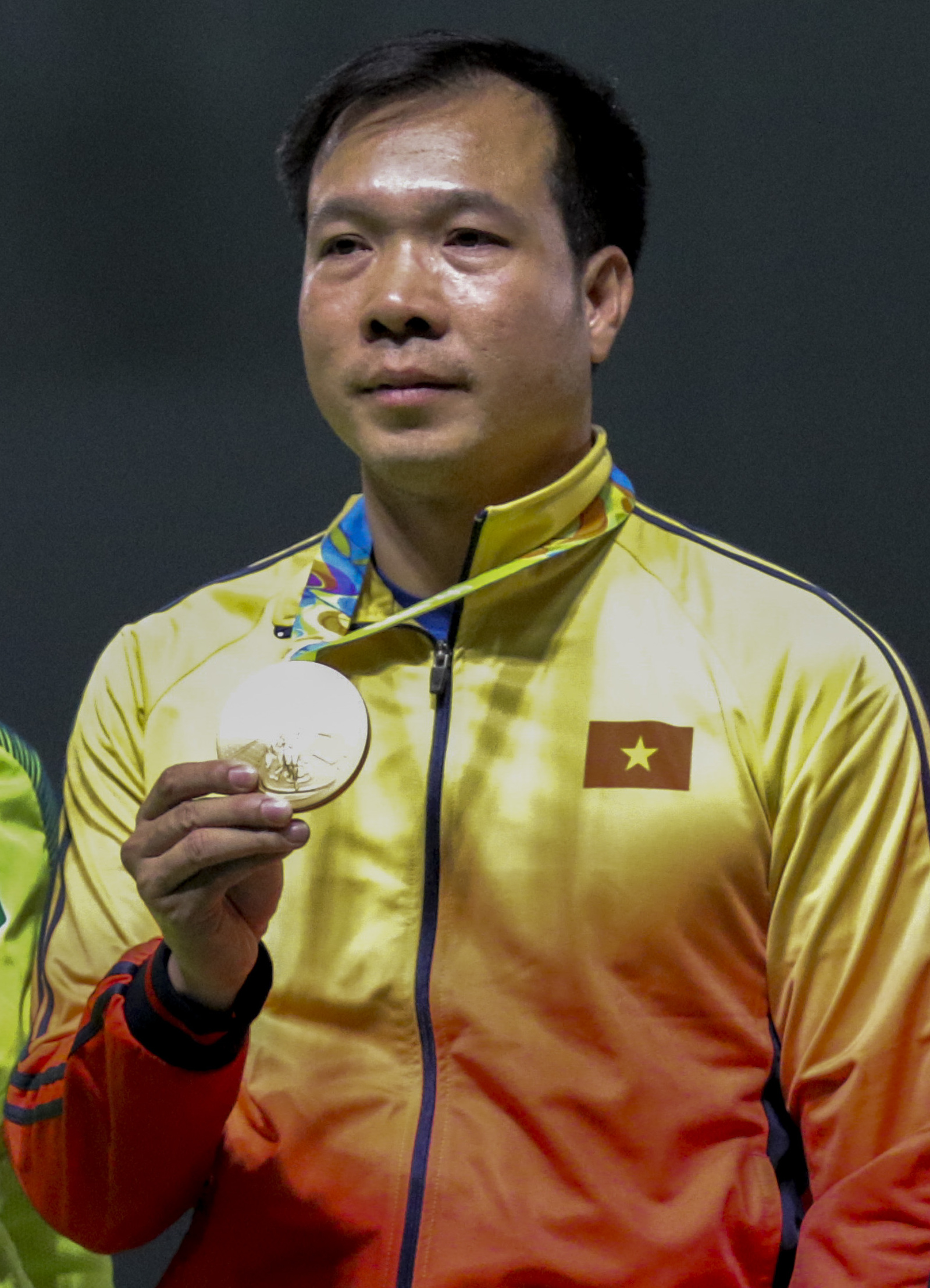
Hoàng Xuân Vinh became the first Vietnamese sportsman to win a gold medal at the Olympics

External videos
- Hoang wins gold in 10m Air Pistol – Rio 2016 Olympic Games
- Shooting: Men's 50m Pistol Qual and Final – Rio 2016 Replays

Vietnam had two qualified shooters for the 2016 Summer Olympics, Hoàng Xuân Vinh and Trần Quốc Cường. At the 2014 ISSF World Shooting Championships in September 2014, Vinh achieved the quota place for the 2016 Olympics at the men's 50m pistol, while Cường claimed his spot in the men's 10 m air pistol. It was Cường's first and Vinh's second consecutive time at the Olympics. Because of their early Olympics notices, the two shooters had more time to practice and compete in the 2015 ISSF World Cup. The shooters were trained in their homeland, the US and South Korea prior to the Games, before moving to Olympic Shooting Centre once they arrived at Rio de Janeiro. In an interview before going to the Games, Cường expressed his goal to reach the finals. At 42 years of age, both shooters were the oldest members of the Vietnamese delegation in Rio.

Vinh and Cường competed in the men's 10 m air pistol events on 6 August, starting with the qualification round where each shooter fired 60 shots. Vinh scored 581 points and ranked in 4th place, claiming a spot into the finals. Cường scored 575 points and finished 26th out of 46 competitors. In the final round, Vinh earned an additional 10.7 points in his last bullet, beating the 10.1 points scored by Brazilian shooter Felipe Wu. Vinh won the gold medal with the final score of 202.5 points, just 0.4 points higher than the runner-up. Four days later, Vinh and Cường took part in the qualification round of the men's 50 metre pistol events. Vinh got 556 points and ranked in sixth, making him eligible for the finals, while Cường scored 542 points and ranked 31st out of 41 competitors. In the final round, Vinh and Jin Jong-oh of South Korea were the last remaining shooters. Vinh came in second place after scoring low in his last two shots, with the final score of 191.3 points, 2.4 points lower than Jin's.

By scoring 202.5 points in the final round of the men's 10 m air pistol, Vinh set a new Olympic record based on the International Shooting Sport Federation Rule changed on 1 January 2013. He became the first Vietnamese athlete to win a gold medal at the Olympics, six decades since Vietnam's first participation in 1952. His silver medal in the men's 50 metre pistol not only made him the first Vietnamese athlete to earn multiple Olympic medals, but also helped Vietnam reach the medal target set by the VOC. Vinh dedicated the historic gold medal to the Vietnamese fans who had been waiting for an Olympic victory. Vinh received a total cash prize of $100.000 (2.4 billion VND) for his results at the Olympics. He went on to compete at the 2020 Summer Olympics following an invitation from the IOC.

List of shooting events for Vietnamese competitors
Athlete	Event	Qualification		Final	
Athlete	Event	Points	Rank	Points	Rank
Hoàng Xuân Vinh	Men's 10 m air pistol	581	4 Q	202.5 OR	1st place, gold medalist(s)
Hoàng Xuân Vinh	Men's 50 m pistol	556	6 Q	191.3	2nd place, silver medalist(s)
Trần Quốc Cường	Men's 10 m air pistol	575	26	Did not advance	
Trần Quốc Cường	Men's 50 m pistol	542	31	Did not advance	
Q = Qualify for the next round; OR = Olympic record

== Swimming ==
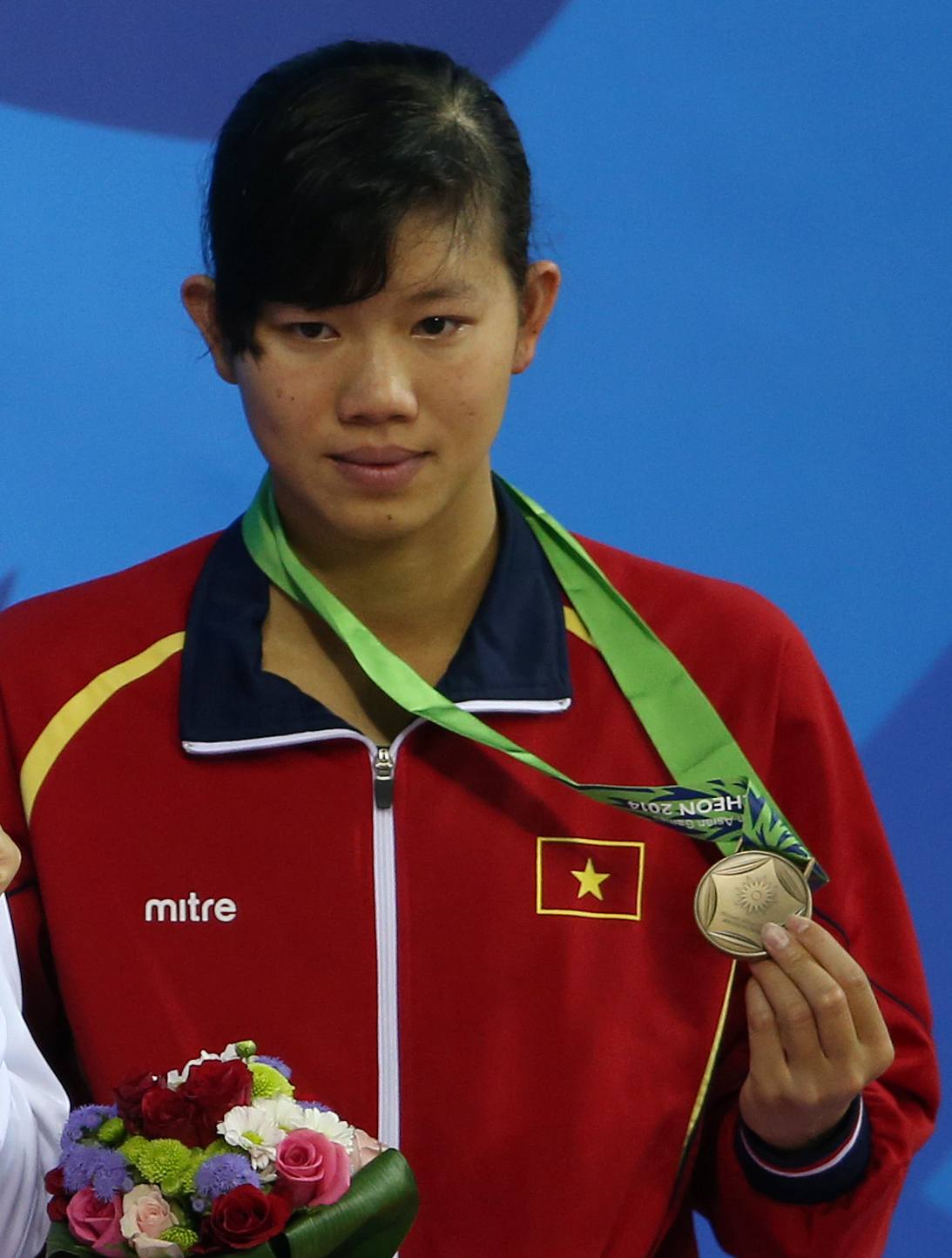
Nguyễn Thị Ánh Viên (pictured in 2014) broke her own national record in the women's 400 metre individual medley category

Vietnam entered two swimmers into the Olympic competition. Nguyễn Thị Ánh Viên was the only Vietnamese swimmer listed on the qualified list compiled by the International Swimming Federation in July 2016. Viên qualified in four A standards, three of them were reached when she competed a year earlier at the Southeast Asian Games. Hoàng Quý Phước, who achieved two B standards, qualified for the Games through wildcard place in July 2016. The VOC picked and submitted Phước among the four Vietnamese male swimmers who also reached the B standards for the sole wildcard spot. Phước achieved the B-standards in April 2015 while practicing in Japan. It marked Phước's first and Viên's second consecutive time at the Olympics. At 20 years old, Viên was the youngest member of the delegation and competed in the most categories, participating in three events.

Phước competed in the men's 200 m freestyle on 7 August. He and Ahmed Mathlouthi of Greece both finished last in the second group with a time of 1:50.39, and later shared the 41st position in the final ranking. On 6 August, Viên first competed in the women's 400 m individual medley, a category that she was well-trained and set the goal to reach the finals. With the finish time of 4:36.85, Viên came in first in the third group and broke her own national record set at the 2015 World Aquatics Championships in the category. Viên's result, however, was not enough to get her into the top eight swimmers in the final round; she ranked in 9th in the final ranking and only 0.31 seconds lower than the 8th ranking swimmer, Emily Overholt of Canada. The following day, she finished last in second group in the women's 400 metre freestyle event. With the finish time of 4:16.32, she ranked 26th out of 32 swimmers in the final ranking. Viên competed in the women's 200 m individual medley event on 8 August, where she finished at the penultimate position with the time of 2:16.20, only ahead of Uzbekistan's Ranohon Amanova, and ranked 33th out of 39 competitors in the final ranking. Viên was included in the list of athletes competing in the 2020 Tokyo Olympics.

List of swimming events for Vietnamese competitors
Athlete	Event	Heat		Semifinal		Final	
Athlete	Event	Time	Rank	Time	Rank	Time	Rank
Hoàng Quý Phước	Men's 200 m freestyle	1:50.39	41	Did not advance			
Nguyễn Thị Ánh Viên	Women's 400 m freestyle	4:16.32	26	—N/a		Did not advance	
Nguyễn Thị Ánh Viên	Women's 200 m individual medley	2:16.20	33	Did not advance			
Nguyễn Thị Ánh Viên	Women's 400 m individual medley	4:36.85	9 NR	—N/a		Did not advance	
"N/A" = Round not applicable for the event; NR = National record

== Weightlifting ==
Vietnamese weightlifters qualified three men's quota places for the Rio Olympics based on their combined team standing by points at the 2014 and 2015 IWF World Championships. Thạch Kim Tuấn and Trần Lê Quốc Toàn were announced for the first two places, followed by Hoàng Tấn Tài in May 2016. That month, Vương Thị Huyền was also chosen for a single women's Olympic spot, added by virtue of a top six national finish at the 2016 Asian Championships.

Huyền was the first wrestler to compete in the women's 48 kg division on 6 August. After her snatch attempt to lift 83kg was dismissed by the referees, Huyền spent the next two takes unsuccessfully trying to lift 84kg. The following day, Tuấn and Toàn went on to compete in the men's 56 kg division. Tuấn, who had suffered from a recurrent knee injury shortly before the Games, registered for 130 kg and managed to do it on the second try, ranked in fourth in the snatch round. In the clean and jerk round, Tuan raised the weight to 160 kg in the last two jerks but could not finish it. Toàn fared better when he successfully lifted 121 kg in snatch and 154 kg in clean and jerk, finishing 5th out of 15 wrestlers. Tài was the last wrestler to compete on the men's 85 kg event on 12 August. He managed to lift 145 kg in snatch and 180 kg in clean and jerk, finishing 16th out of 20 wrestlers. Tuấn was later chosen to compete at the 2020 Summer Olympics.

List of weightlifting events for Vietnamese competitors
Athlete	Event	Snatch		Clean & Jerk		Total	Rank
Athlete	Event	Result	Rank	Result	Rank	Total	Rank
Thạch Kim Tuấn	Men's −56 kg	130	4	~~160~~	DNF	130	DNF
Trần Lê Quốc Toàn	Men's −56 kg	121	6	154	4	275	5
Hoàng Tấn Tài	Men's −85 kg	145	17	180	17	325	17
Vương Thị Huyền	Women's −48 kg	~~84~~	DNF	—	—	—	DNF
"DNF" = Did not finish

== Wrestling ==
Vietnam qualified two wrestlers, Vũ Thị Hằng and Nguyễn Thị Lụa, for each of the following weight classes into the Olympic competition. Hằng and Lụa were chosen as a result of their semifinal triumphs in March 2016 at the Asian Qualification Tournament. Lụa was the first Vietnamese wrestler to compete at the Olympics for the second consecutive time. A day before Hằng's opening match in the women's freestyle 48 kg event on 17 August, the delegation's medical department confirmed she had a recurrence of spinal and lumbar injuries. Hằng subsequently withdrew from the event. On 18 August, Lụa competed against Isabelle Sambou of Senegal in the women's freestyle 53 kg. Lụa lost the two-set match when Senegal knocked her to the floor, with a score of 0–5. Lụa finished 15th on the final ranking.

List of wrestling events for Vietnamese competitors
Athlete	Event	Qualification	Round of 16	Quarterfinal	Semifinal	Repechage 1	Repechage 2	Final / BM	
Athlete	Event	Opposition Result	Opposition Result	Opposition Result	Opposition Result	Opposition Result	Opposition Result	Opposition Result	Rank
Vũ Thị Hằng	Women's –48 kg	Withdrew due to injury							
Nguyễn Thị Lụa	Women's –53 kg	Bye	Sambou (SEN); L 0–5 ^{VT}	Did not advance					15
"Bye" = Athlete not required to compete in round; "VT" = Victory by Fall

== See also ==
- Vietnam at the 2016 Summer Paralympics
- Vietnam at the 2015 SEA Games
