= Vietnam at the 1956 Summer Olympics =

- IOC code: VIE (VNM used at these Games)
- NOC: Vietnam Olympic Committee

in Melbourne/Stockholm
- Competitors: 6 in 1 sport
- Medals: Gold 0 Silver 0 Bronze 0 Total 0

Summer Olympics appearances (overview)
- 1952; 1956; 1960; 1964; 1968; 1972; 1976; 1980; 1984; 1988; 1992; 1996; 2000; 2004; 2008; 2012; 2016; 2020; 2024

The Republic of Vietnam competed as Vietnam in the 1956 Summer Olympics in Melbourne, Australia. Six competitors, all men, took part in four events in one sport.

== Cycling ==
Sprint

- Le Van Phuoc – 16th place

Time trial

- Nguyen Van Nhieu – 1:23.6 (→ 22nd place)

Individual road race

- Ngô Thành Liêm – did not finish (→ no ranking)
- Nguyen Hữu Thoa – did not finish (→ no ranking)
- Tran Gia Thu – did not finish (→ no ranking)
- Trung Trung Lê – did not finish (→ no ranking)
