= Tô Văn Vệ =

Vietnamese swimmer

Personal information
- Born: 17 March 1957 (age 69)

Sport
- Sport: Swimming

Tô Văn Vệ (born 17 March 1957) is a Vietnamese swimmer. He competed in three events at the 1980 Summer Olympics.
