= Quách Hoài Nam =

Vietnamese swimmer

Personal information
- Born: 25 November 1969 (age 56)

Sport
- Sport: Swimming

Quách Hoài Nam (born 25 November 1969) is a Vietnamese swimmer.

== Career ==
He competed in two events at the 1988 Summer Olympics,

He retired in 1997. As of 2006, he is the director of the Hồ Tây Water Park.
