= Vietnam at the 2000 Summer Olympics =

- IOC code: VIE
- NOC: Vietnam Olympic Committee
- Website: www.voc.org.vn (in Vietnamese and English)

in Sydney
- Competitors: 7 (3 men, 4 women) in 4 sports
- Officials: 3
- Medals Ranked 64th: Gold 0 Silver 1 Bronze 0 Total 1

Summer Olympics appearances (overview)
- 1952; 1956; 1960; 1964; 1968; 1972; 1976; 1980; 1984; 1988; 1992; 1996; 2000; 2004; 2008; 2012; 2016; 2020; 2024

Vietnam was represented at the 2000 Summer Olympics in Sydney, New South Wales, Australia by the Vietnam Olympic Committee.

In total, seven athletes including three men and four women represented Vietnam in four different sports including athletics, shooting, swimming and taekwondo.

Vietnam won one medal at the games after Trần Hiếu Ngân claimed silver in the taekwondo women's –57 kg category – the first ever medal won by a Vietnamese athlete.

== Competitors ==
In total, seven athletes represented Vietnam at the 2000 Summer Olympics in Sydney, New South Wales, Australia across four different sports.

Sport	Men	Women	Total
Athletics	1	1	2
Shooting	1	0	1
Swimming	1	1	2
Taekwondo	0	2	2
Total	3	4	7

== Medalists ==
Vietnam won one medal at the games after Trần Hiếu Ngân claimed silver in the taekwondo women's –57 kg category.

Medal	Name	Sport	Event
Silver	Trần Hiếu Ngân	Taekwondo	taekwondo women's –57 kg

== Athletics ==
In total, two Vietnamese athletes participated in the athletics events – Lương Tích Thiện in the men's 100 m and Vũ Bích Hường in the women's 100 m hurdles.

The heats for the men's 100 m took place on 22 September 2000. Lương Tích Thiện finished seventh in his heat in a time of 10.85 seconds. He did not advance to the quarter-finals.

The heats for the women's 100 m hurdles took place on 25 September 2000. Vũ Bích Hường finished sixth in her heat in a time of 13.61 seconds. She did not advance to the quarter-finals.

== Shooting ==
In total, one Vietnamese athlete participated in the shooting events – Nguyễn Trung Hiếu in the men's 25 m rapid fire pistol.

The preliminary round for the men's 25 m rapid fire pistol took place on 20 September 2000. Nguyễn Trung Hiếu scored 577 across the two rounds. He did not advance to the final and finished 17th overall.

== Swimming ==
In total, two Vietnamese athletes participated in the swimming events – Nguyễn Ngọc Anh in the men's 200 m breaststroke and Nguyễn Thị Hương in the women's 400 m individual medley.

The heats for the women's 400 m individual medley took place on 16 September 2000. Nguyễn Thị Hương finished fourth in her heat in a time of five minutes 26.56 seconds which was ultimately not fast enough to advance to the final.

The heats for the men's 200 m breaststroke took place on 19 September 2000. Nguyễn Ngọc Anh finished second in his heat in a time of two minutes 29.54 seconds which was ultimately not fast enough to advance to the semi-finals.

== Taekwondo ==
In total, two Vietnamese athletes participated in the taekwando events – Nguyễn Thị Xuân Mai in the women's –49 kg and Trần Hiếu Ngân in the women's –57 kg category.

The women's –49 kg category took place on 27 September 2000. Nguyễn Thị Xuân Mai received a bye in the first round. In the second round, she lost to Döndü Güvenç of Turkey.

The women's –57 kg category took place on 28 September 2000. Trần Hiếu Ngân defeated Cheryl-Ann Sankar of Trinidad and Tobago in the first round. In the quarter-finals, she defeated to Jasmin Strachan of the Philippines. In the semi-finals, she defeated Virginia Lourens of the Netherlands. Her winning streak came to an end in the final when she lost to Jung Jae-eun of South Korea and won the silver medal. It was the first ever medal won by a Vietnamese athlete.
