= Trần Văn Xuân =

Vietnamese fencer (born 1934)

Personal information
- Born: 6 September 1934 Saigon, Vietnam

Sport
- Sport: Fencing

Trần Văn Xuân (born 6 September 1934) is a Vietnamese fencer. He competed at the 1960 and 1964 Summer Olympics.
