= Cao Ngọc Phương Trinh =

Vietnamese judoka (born 1972)

Personal information
- Nationality: Vietnamese
- Born: 4 August 1972 (age 54)

Sport
- Sport: Judo

Cao Ngọc Phương Trinh (born 4 August 1972) is a Vietnamese judoka, who is known for being the champion for three consecutive SEA Games (16, 17 and 18). She competed in the women's extra-lightweight event at the 1996 Summer Olympics.

In 2021, Trinh was working as a physical education teacher and Judo coach at Minh Khai Club (Nguyen Thi Minh Khai High School).
