= Phan Hữu Dong =

Vietnamese swimmer

Personal information
- Born: 14 November 1938 (age 87) Bến Tre, French Indochina

Sport
- Sport: Swimming
Medal record
Men's swimming
Representing Vietnam
Southeast Asian Peninsular Games
Gold medal – first place	1961 Rangoon	100 m butterfly
Bronze medal – third place	1959 Bangkok	100 m butterfly

Phan Hữu Dong (born 14 November 1938) is a Vietnamese former swimmer. He competed at the 1956 Summer Olympics, 1960 Summer Olympics and the 1964 Summer Olympics.
