= Nguyễn Kiều Oanh =

Vietnamese swimmer (born 1969)

Personal information
- Born: 10 March 1969 (age 57) Saigon, South Vietnam
- Spouse: Đỗ Trọng Thịnh
- Children: 2

Sport
- Sport: Swimming

Nguyễn Kiều Oanh (born 10 March 1969) is a Vietnamese swimming coach and former butterfly and medley swimmer.

== Career ==
She competed at the 1988 Summer Olympics and the 1992 Summer Olympics.

In 1990, she won 14 gold medals and broke five national records in Vietnam National Games. In 1992, she hold 13 national swimming records. Four years later, she retired.

During her swimming career, she broke national records 60 times.

She coaches Ho Chi Minh City young swimmers team.

In October 2025, Oanh participated in the 2025 Ho Chi Minh City Elderly Swimming Championship.

== Personal life ==
In 1982, her family prepared to emigrate to the United States for family reunification. Oanh refused this and wanted to remain in Vietnam.

In February 1997, she married her coach Đỗ Trọng Thịnh. She has two sons. As of 2013, she is the vice-chairman of the Yết Kiêu Water Sports Center.
