= Vietnam at the 1952 Summer Olympics =

- IOC code: VIE (VNM used at these Games)
- NOC: Vietnam Olympic Committee

in Helsinki
- Competitors: 8 in 5 sports
- Medals: Gold 0 Silver 0 Bronze 0 Total 0

Summer Olympics appearances (overview)
- 1952; 1956; 1960; 1964; 1968; 1972; 1976; 1980; 1984; 1988; 1992; 1996; 2000; 2004; 2008; 2012; 2016; 2020; 2024

The State of Vietnam competed as Vietnam in the 1952 Summer Olympics in Helsinki, Finland. It was the first time the nation had participated at the Summer Olympic Games. Eight competitors, all men, took part in seven events in five sports.

== Athletics ==
Men's 10,000 metres

- Trần Văn Lý — 37:33.0 (→ 32nd place)

== Boxing ==
Bantamweight (-54 kg)

- Tiến Vình

== Cycling ==
Road Competition

Men's Individual Road Race (190.4 km)

- Quan Luu — 5:24:34.1 (→ 47th place)
- Chau Phuoc Vinh — did not finish (→ no ranking)
- Nguyen Duc Hien — did not finish (→ no ranking)
- Van Phuoc Le — did not finish (→ no ranking)

== Fencing ==
One fencer represented Vietnam in 1952.

Men's épée

- Tôn Thất Hải

== Swimming ==
Men

Ranks given are within the heat.

Athlete	Event	Heat		Semifinal		Final	
Athlete	Event	Time	Rank	Time	Rank	Time	Rank
Nguyễn Văn Phan	100 m freestyle	1:05.0	7	Did not advance			
Nguyễn Văn Phan	400 m freestyle	5:36.5	6	Did not advance			
