= Hồ Minh Thu =

Vietnamese sports shooter

Personal information
- Nationality: Vietnamese
- Born: 15 June 1929 Bạc Liêu, French Indochina

Sport
- Sport: Sports shooting

Hồ Minh Thu (born 15 June 1929) is a Vietnamese former sports shooter. He competed at the 1968 Summer Olympics and the 1972 Summer Olympics. He also competed at the 1970 and 1974 Asian Games.
