= Vietnam Olympic Committee =

National Olympic Committee

Viet Nam Olympic Committee
- Country: Vietnam
- Code: VIE
- Created: 1952 (as State of Vietnam); 20 December 1976 (as of unified Socialist Republic of Vietnam)
- Recognized: 1979 (current NOC)
- Continental Association: OCA
- Headquarters: 36 Trần Phú Str., Ba Đình district, Hanoi, Vietnam
- President: Nguyễn Văn Hùng
- Secretary General: Trần Văn Mạnh
- Website: www.voc.org.vn

The Vietnam Olympic Committee (VOC; Vietnamese: Ủy ban Olympic Việt Nam, IOC code: VIE), fully the Olympic Committee of the Socialist Republic of Viet Nam (Ủy ban Olympic nước Cộng hòa xã hội chủ nghĩa Việt Nam), is the National Olympic Committee representing Vietnam.

The insignia and logo of the VOC is a stylized national flag of Vietnam placed above the Olympic rings. It has been serving as the official symbol of the Vietnamese Olympic movement since 1979, when the VOC was officially recognized by IOC under the name of the reunified Vietnamese nation.
