= ISSF 25 meter standard pistol =

ISSF shooting event

Men
- Number of shots: 3x20
- World Championships: Since 1970
- Abbreviation: STP

25 meter standard pistol is one of the ISSF shooting events, introduced at the ISSF World Shooting Championships in 1970. It has its roots in the conventional pistol competitions developed by the National Rifle Association of America.

The standard pistol match is shot with a regular sport pistol (also called a standard pistol) in caliber .22 LR. As with all ISSF pistol disciplines, all firing must be done with one hand, unsupported.

The 60-shot match is divided into 5-shot strings with different timings:

- 4 strings within 150 seconds each – competitor can begin the series in any fashion he/she chooses.
- 4 strings within 20 seconds each – competitor must begin each string with pistol in one outstretched arm from the 45-degree angle starting position.
- 4 strings within 10 seconds each – competitor must begin each string with pistol in one outstretched arm from the 45-degree angle starting position.

Like 25 meter center-fire pistol, standard pistol is a non-Olympic event and gains relatively little attention. It is one of the few events where targets did not change in 1989, so records were not reset. As of September 2026, the Men's World Record dated to 1983, although the women's and junior records had been broken as recently as 2022.

== World Championships, Men ==
Year	Place	Gold	Silver	Bronze
1970	(United States) Phoenix	Renart Suleimanov (URS)	Hynek Hromada (TCH)	William McMillan (USA)
1974	(Switzerland) Thun	Victor Torshin (URS)	Bonnie Harmon (USA)	Valeri Margasov (URS)
1978	(South Korea) Seoul	Ragnar Skanåker (SWE)	Seppo Saarenpää (FIN)	Hannu Paavola (FIN)
1982	(Venezuela) Caracas	Vladas Turla (URS)	Alexsander Melentiev (URS)	Aldo Andreotti (ITA)
1986	(East Germany) Suhl	Afanasij Kuzmin (URS)	Hermann Sailer (AUT)	Igor Basinski (URS)
1990	(Soviet Union) Moscow	Miroslav Ignatiuk (URS)	Finn Damkjaer (DEN)	Anton Kuechler (SUI)
1994	(Italy) Milan	Sang Hak Lee (KOR)	Hansrudolf Schneider (SUI)	Seppo Makinen (FIN)
1998	(Spain) Barcelona	Mikhail Nestruev (RUS)	Paal Hembre (NOR)	Yongde Jin (CHN)
2002	(Finland) Lahti	Rene Vogn (DEN)	Alexander Danilov (ISR)	Giovanni Bossi (AUT)
2006	(Croatia) Zagreb	Guohui Liu (CHN)	Jong Su Kim (PRK)	Jakkrit Panichpatikum (THA)
2010	(Germany) Munich	Seong Hwan Hong (KOR)	Yongde Jin (CHN)	Júlio Almeida (BRA)
2014	(Spain) Granada	Yusuf Dikeç (TUR)	João Costa (POR)	Christian Reitz (GER)
2018	(South Korea) Changwon	Pavlo Korostylov (UKR)	Gurpreet Singh (IND)	Kim Jun-hong (KOR)
2022	(Egypt) Cairo	Pavlo Korostylov (UKR)	Christian Reitz (GER)	Vijayveer Sidhu (IND)

== World Championships, Men Junior ==
Year	Place	Gold	Silver	Bronze
1994	(Italy) Milan	Jaspal Rana (IND)	Ricardo Yuston (ARG)	Joseph Gonzalez (USA)
1998	(Spain) Barcelona	Manuel Jun Guevara (VEN)	Gregory Fouet (FRA)	Rinat Ishbaev (RUS)
2002	(Finland) Lahti	Denis Kulakov (RUS)	Vladimir Issachenko (KAZ)	Julien Dufour (FRA)
2006	(Croatia) Zagreb	Kyusang Park (KOR)	Leonid Ekimov (RUS)	Thibaut Sauvage (FRA)
2010	(Germany) Munich	Zhigou Zhou (CHN)	Aaron Sauter (GER)	Xuan Feng Long (CHN)
2014	(Spain) Granada	Alexander Chichkov (USA)	Dario Di Martino (ITA)	Pardeep Pardeep (IND)
2018	(South Korea) Changwon	Vijayveer Sidhu (IND)	Lee Gun-hyeok (KOR)	Zhu Haojie (CHN)
2022	(Egypt) Cairo	Udhayveer Sidhu (IND)	Liu Yangpan (CHN)	Sameer Sameer (IND)

== World Championships, Men Team ==
Year	Place	Gold	Silver	Bronze
1970	(United States) Phoenix, Arizona	(United States) United States; William Blankenship; William Mc Millan; Edwin Lee Teague; Charles Wheeler	(Soviet Union) Soviet Union; Igor Bakalov; Anatoli Spivakov; Vladimir Stolipin; Renart Suleimanov	(Czechoslovakia) Czechoslovakia; Ladislav Falta; Hynek Hromada; Vladimír Hurt; Lubomír Nácovský
1974	(Switzerland) Thun	(Soviet Union) Soviet Union; Afanasij Kuzmin; Valeri Margasov; Vladimir Stolipin; Victor Torshin	(Czechoslovakia) Czechoslovakia; Vladimír Hyka; Milan Hyka; Hynek Hromada; Vladimír Hurt	(United States) United States; Marvin Black; Bonnie Harmon; Bobby Tiner; Charles Wheeler
1978	(South Korea) Seoul	(Finland) Finland; Seppo Makinen; Hannu Paavola; Paavo Palokangas; Seppo Saarenpää	(Italy) Italy; Giuseppe Quadro; Alberto Sevieri; Roberto Vannozzi; Renato Zambon	(Switzerland) Switzerland; Marcel Ansermet; Otto Keller; Reinhard Ruess; Alex Tschui
1982	(Venezuela) Caracas	(Soviet Union) Soviet Union; Anatoli Egrishin; Aleksandr Melentyev; Sergei Sumatokhin; Vladas Turla	(Italy) Italy; Aldo Andreotti; Giulio Mussini; Giuseppe Quadro; Renato Zambon	(United States) United States; Erich Buljung; John Kailer; Melvin Makin; Don Nygord
1986	(East Germany) Suhl	(Soviet Union) Soviet Union; Igor Basinski; Afanasij Kuzmin; Sergei Pyzhianov	(Austria) Austria; Dieter Aggermann; Karl Pavlis; Hermann Sailer	(Finland) Finland; Seppo Makinen; Paavo Palokangas; Jouni Vainio
1990	(Soviet Union) Moscow	(Soviet Union) Soviet Union; Igor Basinski; Miroslav Ignatiuk; Afanasij Kuzmin	(China) China; Hui Wang; Runxi Wang; Yifu Wang	(United States) United States; Erich Buljung; Jimmie Mc Coy; Don Nygord
1994	(Italy) Milan	(Finland) Finland; Jari Koivu; Seppo Makinen; Jouni Vainio	(China) China; Gang Meng; Runxi Wang; Ruimin Zhang	(Switzerland) Switzerland; Eros de Berti; Andreas Schweizer; Hansrudolf Schneider
1998	(Spain) Barcelona	(China) China; Yongde Jin; Gang Meng; Yifu Wang	(Norway) Norway; Paal Hembre; Petter Bratli; Johnny Nilsen	(Austria) Austria; Giovanni Bossi; Karl Pavlis; Gerhard Boehm
2002	(Finland) Lahti	(Austria) Austria; Giovanni Bossi; Karl Pavlis; Heinz Koeltringer	(South Korea) Korea; Byung Taek Park; Sang Hak Lee; Seong Hwan Hong	(China) China; Yongde Jin; Yadong Liu; Guohui Liu
2006	(Croatia) Zagreb	(China) China; Guohui Liu; Yongde Jin; Yadong Liu	(Russia) Russia; Mikhail Nestruev; Sergei Poliakov; Sergei Alifirenko	(Ukraine) Ukraine; Oleg Tkachyov; Roman Bondaruk; Oleksandr Petriv
2010	(Germany) Munich	(China) China; Yongde Jin; Chuanlin Li; Zhenxiang Xie	(Germany) Germany; Pierre Michel; Christian Reitz; Michael Schleuter	(South Korea) Korea; Seong Hwan Hong; Yoon Sam Hwang; Dae Kyu Jang
2014	(Spain) Granada	(Ukraine) Ukraine; Pavlo Korostylov; Roman Bondaruk; Oleksandr Petriv	(China) China; Yongde Jin; Chuanlin Li; Feng Ding	(Turkey) Turkey; Yusuf Dikeç; Fatih Kavaruk; Murat Kilinc
2018	(South Korea) Changwon	France; Clément Bessaguet; Boris Artaud; Alban Pierson	South Korea; Kim Jun-hong; Kim Young-min; Jang Dae-kyu	Ukraine; Pavlo Korostylov; Volodymyr Pasternak; Oleksandr Petriv

== World Championships, Women ==
This event was held at World Championships in 1970 and 2022.

Year	Place	Gold	Silver	Bronze
1970	(United States) Phoenix	Judy Trim (AUS)	Gloria Vause (AUS)	Nina Stoliarova (URS)
2022	(Egypt) New Administrative Capital	Xiao Jiaruixuan (CHN)	Rhythm Sangwan (IND)	Chen Yan (CHN)

== World Championships, Women Team ==
This event was held at World Championships in 1970.

Year	Place	Gold	Silver	Bronze
1970	(United States) Phoenix	(Australia) Australia; E. Newton; Judy Trim; Gloria Vause	(United States) United States; Sally Carroll; Lucile Chambliss; M. Norkauer	(West Germany) West Germany; Ortrud Feickert; Karin Fitzner; Ruth Kasten

== World Championships, Mixed Team ==
This event was held at World Championships in 2022.

Year	Place	Gold	Silver	Bronze
2022	(Egypt) New Administrative Capital	Germany; Doreen Vennekamp; Christian Reitz	Korea; Kim Jang-mi; Kim Seo-jun	Ukraine; Olena Kostevych; Pavlo Korostylov

== World Championships, total medals ==
Rank	Nation	Gold	Silver	Bronze	Total
1	Soviet Union	11	2	2	15
2	China	5	5	3	13
3	South Korea	3	1	1	5
4	Russia	2	2	1	5
5	United States	2	1	6	9
6	Finland	2	1	4	7
7	Austria	1	3	2	6
8	Denmark	1	1	0	2
9	India	1	0	1	2
9	Turkey	1	0	1	2
9	Ukraine	1	0	1	2
12	Sweden	1	0	0	1
12	Venezuela	1	0	0	1
14	Italy	0	3	1	4
15	Czechoslovakia	0	2	1	3
15	Germany	0	2	1	3
17	Norway	0	2	0	2
18	Switzerland	0	1	3	4
19	France	0	1	2	3
20	Argentina	0	1	0	1
20	Israel	0	1	0	1
20	Kazakhstan	0	1	0	1
20	North Korea	0	1	0	1
20	Portugal	0	1	0	1
25	Brazil	0	0	1	1
25	Thailand	0	0	1	1
Totals (26 entries)		32	32	32	96

== Current world records ==
Current world records in 25 metre standard pistol
Competitors		Record	Holder	Date achieved	Location
Men	Individual	584	Erich Buljung (USA)	August 20, 1983	Caracas (VEN)
Men	Teams	1725	Soviet Union (Kuzmins, Melentyev, Turla); Soviet Union (Kuzmins, Basinski, Pyzhianov)	September 10, 1985; September 8, 1986	Osijek (YUG); Suhl (GDR)
Women	Individual	575	Xiao Jiaruixuan (CHN)	October 19, 2022	Cairo (EGY)
Women	Teams	1693	China (Yao Qianxun, Sun Yujie, Chen Jia)	October 15, 2025	Cairo (EGY)
Junior Men	Individual	581	Pavlo Korostylov (UKR)	July 30, 2017	Baku (AZE)
Junior Men	Teams	1707	India (Sidhu U., Sidhu V., Singh)	July 13, 2019	Suhl (GER)
Junior Women	Individual	580	Feng Sixuan (CHN)	October 15, 2022	Cairo (EGY)
Junior Women	Teams	1666	China (Wang Keyi, Zhu Siying, Li Xueying)	July 13, 2019	Suhl (GER)

== World champions ==
Year	Venue	Seniors		Juniors	
Year	Venue	Individual	Team	Individual	Team
1970	Phoenix, Arizona	Renart Suleimanov (URS)	United States		
1974	Thun	Viktor Torshin (URS)	Soviet Union		
1978	Seoul	Ragnar Skanåker (SWE)	Finland		
1982	Caracas	Vladas Turla (URS)	Soviet Union		
1986	Suhl	Afanasijs Kuzmins (URS)	Soviet Union		
1990	Moscow	Miroslav Ignatiuk (URS)	Soviet Union		
1994	Milan	Lee Sang-hak (KOR)	Finland	Jaspal Rana (IND)	Moldova
1998	Barcelona	Mikhail Nestruyev (RUS)	China	Manuel Guevara Jr. (VEN)	Venezuela
2002	Lahti	René Vogn (DEN)	Austria	Denis Kulakov (RUS)	Russia
2006	Zagreb	Liu Guohui (CHN)	China	Park Kyu-sang (KOR)	Russia
2010	Munich	Hong Seong Hwan (KOR)	China	Zhou Zhiguo (CHN)	China
2014	Granada	Yusuf Dikeç (TUR)	Ukraine	Alexander Chichkov (USA)	Mongolia
