= ISSF 25 meter center-fire pistol =

ISSF shooting event

Men
- Number of shots: 2x30
- Olympic Games: –
- World Championships: Since 1947
- Abbreviation: CFP

25 meter center-fire pistol is one of the ISSF shooting events, and is normally a men-only event. Its origin lies in competitions with military-style service pistols, and as such its history dates back to the 19th century.

25 meter pistol (formerly called sport pistol) is essentially the women's equivalent of this event, the only difference being the smaller rimfire caliber handguns used (often the same models only chambered for the smaller caliber).

== Handguns ==
=== Caliber ===
The name center-fire describes the type of cartridges used distinguishes this event from other ISSF events shot with handguns chambered for small caliber rimfire cartridges.

The rules specify that matches are to be shot with handgun of any caliber between 7.62 mm (.30) and 9.65 mm (.38), but the most popular cartridge is the .32 S&W Long Wadcutter, because it has good performance characteristics. Many countries also have laws restricting civilian ownership of firearms chambered for cartridges also used by military forces which would not apply to the rather obscure .32 S&W Long.

=== Type ===
Using a revolver is not a disadvantage because the "rapid-fire" stage is not as demanding or fast as the true rapid-fire event of 25 meter rapid fire pistol. The current record is set with a revolver (Toz 49). The most popular handgun choices, however, are larger caliber versions of rimfire semi-automatic pistols originally designed for 25 meter standard pistol. Many of these pistols can be changed from one caliber to the other by simply changing the barrel and magazine. Examples of such firearms are usually from companies specializing in firearms for ISSF events like Pardini Arms, Benelli, Morini, Walther and Hämmerli and include:

- Hämmerli SP20
- Pardini HP
- Morini CM32M
- Walther GSP
- Benelli MP-90 and Benelli MP-95

== Course of fire ==
The 25 and 50 meter pistol target, with a diameter of 500 mm

A center-fire match consists of two parts of 30 shots each, both shot at 25 m:

- A precision stage where 5 shots are to be fired during a 5-minute period.
- A rapid-fire stage where, for each shot, the shooter has 3 seconds to raise his arm from a 45-degree angle and fire.
- As with all ISSF pistol disciplines, all firing must be done with one hand, unsupported.

The score zones of the targets are different for the two stages, but scores are usually similar for the two courses. In the precision stage, the target is the same as in 50 meter pistol (although at half the distance), with a 10-zone of 5 cm diameter, and in the rapid-fire stage, the target is the same as in 25 meter rapid fire pistol, with a 10-zone of 10 cm diameter.

== Popularity ==
The event has not made it into the Olympic Games, and so gains little attention. It is part of the ISSF World Shooting Championships however, as well as the CISM World Championships. It is also notable for being the inspiration for the 25 meter pistol event, which is an Olympic event for women.

== World Championships, Men ==
| Year | Place | Gold | Silver | Bronze |
|---|---|---|---|---|
| 1947 | (Sweden) Stockholm | Torsten Elis Ullman (SWE) | Mauri Kuokka (FIN) | Rodeheffer N. J. (USA) |
| 1949 | (Argentina) Buenos Aires | Heinrich Keller (SUI) | Eino Antton Saarnikko (FIN) | Huelet Leo Benner (USA) |
| 1952 | (Norway) Oslo | Harry Wendell Reeves (USA) | Walter Rudolph Walsh (USA) | Huelet Leo Benner (USA) |
| 1954 | (Venezuela) Caracas | Torsten Elis Ullman (SWE) | Huelet Leo Benner (USA) | William Mc Millan (USA) |
| 1958 | (Soviet Union) Moscow | William Mc Millan (USA) | Vladimír Kudrna (TCH) | Károly Takács (HUN) |
| 1962 | (Egypt) Cairo | Igor Bakalov (URS) | Efim Haydurov (URS) | William Blankenship (USA) |
| 1966 | (West Germany) Wiesbaden | William Blankenship (USA) | Lubomír Nácovský (TCH) | Renart Suleimanov (URS) |
| 1970 | (United States) Phoenix | Rafael Carpio (MEX) | Seppo Makinen (FIN) | Lubomír Nácovský (TCH) |
| 1974 | (Switzerland) Thun | Dan Iuga (ROM) | Francis "Frank" Higginson (USA) | Hynek Hromada (TCH) |
| 1978 | (South Korea) Seoul | Seppo Makinen (FIN) | Park Jong-kil (KOR) | Seppo Saarenpaeae (FIN) |
| 1982 | (Venezuela) Caracas | Vladas Turla (URS) | Sergei Rysev (URS) | Jaques Cheres (FRA) |
| 1986 | (East Germany) Suhl | Oleg Tkachyov (URS) | Afanasij Kuzmin (URS) | Igor Basinski (URS) |
| 1990 | (Soviet Union) Moscow | Sergei Pyzhianov (URS) | Miroslav Ignatiuk (URS) | Park Byung-Taek (KOR) |
| 1994 | (Italy) Milan | Paal Hembre (NOR) | Christian Kezel (FRA) | Oleg Tkachyov (UKR) |
| 1998 | (Spain) Barcelona | Park Byung-Taek (KOR) | Paal Hembre (NOR) | Giovanni Bossi (AUT) |
| 2002 | (Finland) Lahti | Park Byung-Taek (KOR) | Mikhail Nestruev (RUS) | Lee Sang-hak (KOR) |
| 2006 | (Croatia) Zagreb | Yadong Liu (CHN) | Mikhail Nestruev (RUS) | Michael Hofmann (SUI) |
| 2010 | (Germany) Munich | Leonid Yekimov (RUS) | Júlio Almeida (BRA) | Pål Hembre (NOR) |
| 2014 | (Spain) Granada | Yusuf Dikeç (TUR) | Oleksandr Petriv (UKR) | Tomas Tehan (CZE) |
| 2018 | (South Korea) Changwon | Julio Almeida (BRA) | Christian Reitz (GER) | Pavlo Korostylov (UKR) |
| 2022 | (Egypt) New Administrative Capital | Christian Reitz (GER) | Ruslan Lunev (AZE) | Peeter Olesk (EST) |

== World Championships, Men Team ==
| Year | Place | Gold | Silver | Bronze |
|---|---|---|---|---|
| 1947 | (Sweden) Stockholm | (Finland) Finland; Kallio M. Mauri Kuokka; Jaakko Eliel Rintanen; Vaeinoe Villiam Skarp | (Sweden) Sweden; Helmisalo A. Holmberg E. Sven Lundquist; Torsten Elis Ullman | (United Kingdom) Great Britain; Bennett R. Staton B. Henry Albert Steele; Willott B. |
| 1949 | (Argentina) Buenos Aires | (United States) United States; Huelet Leo Benner; Hancock W. Logie C. Harry Wendell Reeves | (Switzerland) Switzerland; Heinz Ambuehl; Gaemperli H. Heinrich Keller; Beat Rhyner | (Finland) Finland; Kallio M. Leonard Ravilo; Jaakko Eliel Rintanen; Eino Antton Saarnikko |
| 1952 | (Norway) Oslo | (United States) United States; Huelet Leo Benner; William Mc Millan; Harry Wendell Reeves; Walter Rudolph Walsh | (Sweden) Sweden; Fagerholm E. Holmberg E. Roback C. Schoett G. | (Mexico) Mexico; Rafael Bermejo; Pedro Avilés; Jose Reyes; Carlos Rodriguez |
| 1954 | (Venezuela) Caracas | (Soviet Union) Soviet Union; Anton Jasinsky; Konstantin Martazov; Makhmud Umarov; Lev Vainshtein | (United States) United States; Huelet Leo Benner; John Jagoda; William Mc Millan; Harry Wendell Reeves | (Cuba) Cuba; Tomas Cabanas; Rafael Antonio Cadalso Fernandez; Dediot L. Rodriguez C. |
| 1958 | (Soviet Union) Moscow | (Czechoslovakia) Czechoslovakia; Karel Mucha; František Maxa; Vladimír Kudrna; Vaclav Trojan | (Soviet Union) Soviet Union; Anton Jasinsky; Vassili Sorokin; Makhmud Umarov; Lev Vainshtein | (United States) United States; Huelet Leo Benner; David Carter; William Mc Millan; Aubrey Smith |
| 1962 | (Egypt) Cairo | (Soviet Union) Soviet Union; Efim Haydurov; Igor Bakalov; Vladimir Stolipin; Albert Udachin | (United States) United States; William Blankenship; Franklin Green; William Mc Millan; Cecil Wallis | (East Germany) East Germany; Joachim Fichtner; Johann Garreis; Lothar Jacobi; Gottfried Wehle |
| 1966 | (West Germany) Wiesbaden | (United States) United States; William Blankenship; John Ditmore; Franklin Green; Emil Heugatter | (Soviet Union) Soviet Union; Igor Bakalov; Renart Suleimanov; Vladimir Stolipin; Albert Udachin | (Czechoslovakia) Czechoslovakia; Ladislav Falta; Lubomír Nácovský; Josef Šváb; Jaroslav Veselý |
| 1970 | (United States) Phoenix | (Czechoslovakia) Czechoslovakia; Ladislav Falta; Hynek Hromada; Vladimír Hurt; Lubomír Nácovský | (United States) United States; William Blankenship; Jimmie Dorsey; Elmer Hilden; Francis Higginson | (Soviet Union) Soviet Union; Igor Bakalov; Grigori Kosych; Afanasij Kuzmin; Vladimir Stolipin |
| 1974 | (Switzerland) Thun | (Soviet Union) Soviet Union; Grigori Kosych; Victor Torshin; Georgi Zapolskich; Mikhail Ziubko | (United States) United States; Bonnie Harmon; Francis "Frank" Higginson; Bobby Tiner; Milo Vlasin | (Finland) Finland; Eino Kohvakka; Seppo Makinen; Vaino Markkanen; Lassi Riitinki |
| 1978 | (South Korea) Seoul | (Finland) Finland; Olavi Johannes Heikkinen; Seppo Makinen; Hannu Paavola; Seppo Saarenpaeae | (Switzerland) Switzerland; Marcel Ansermet; Philippe Klay; Reinhard Ruess; Alex Tschui | (Sweden) Sweden; Ove Gunnarsson; Boo Levin; Staffan Oscarsson; Ragnar Skanåker |
| 1982 | (Venezuela) Caracas | (Soviet Union) Soviet Union; Afanasij Kuzmin; Igor Puzirev; Sergei Rysev; Vladas Turla | (Switzerland) Switzerland; Marcel Ansermet; Reinhard Ruess; Sigisbert Schnyder; Alex Tschui | (Finland) Finland; Seppo Makinen; Hannu Paavola; Paavo Palokangas; Jouni Vainio |
| 1986 | (East Germany) Suhl | (Soviet Union) Soviet Union; Igor Basinski; Afanasij Kuzmin; Oleg Tkachyov | (Switzerland) Switzerland; Hans Buerkli; Anton Kuechler; Alex Tschui | (Austria) Austria; Dieter Aggermann; Hermann Sailer; Karl Pavlis |
| 1990 | (Soviet Union) Moscow | (Soviet Union) Soviet Union; Miroslav Ignatiuk; Afanasij Kuzmin; Sergei Pyzhianov | (Finland) Finland; Seppo Makinen; Asko Makinen; Reijo Paerepalo | (United States) United States; Don Nygord; Eduardo Suarez; Darius Young |
| 1994 | (Italy) Milan | (Russia) Russia; Sergei Poliakov; Sergei Pyzhianov; Valentin Osipenko | (Ukraine) Ukraine; Miroslav Ignatiuk; Taras Magmet; Oleg Tkachyov | (South Korea) South Korea; Lee Sang-Hak; Lee Ki-Choon; Park Byung-Taek |
| 1998 | (Spain) Barcelona | (South Korea) South Korea; Park Byung-Taek; Lee Sang-Hak; Kim Sung-joon | (Russia) Russia; Sergei Pyzhianov; Mikhail Nestruev; Sergei Alifirenko | (Belarus) Belarus; Igor Basinski; Siarhei Yurusau; Kanstantsin Lukashyk |
| 2002 | (Finland) Lahti | (South Korea) South Korea; Park Byung-Taek; Lee Sang-Hak; Kim Sung-joon | (Norway) Norway; Petter Bratli; Paal Hembre; Erik Baekkevold | (Ukraine) Ukraine; Oleksandr Petriv; Oleg Tkachyov; Roman Bondaruk |
| 2006 | (Croatia) Zagreb | (Russia) Russia; Mikhail Nestruev; Sergei Poliakov; Sergei Alifirenko | (South Korea) South Korea; Park Byung-Taek; Hong Seong-Hwan; Lee Sang-Hak | (North Korea) North Korea; Kim Hyon-ung; Ryu Myong-yon; Kim Jong-su |
| 2010 | (Germany) Munich | (Brazil) Brazil; Júlio Almeida; Emerson Duarte; José Carlos Batista | (France) France; Sebastien Blachouin; Franck Dumoulin; Thierry Riedinger | (South Korea) South Korea; Hong Seong-hwan; Park Byung-taek; Jang Dae-kyu |
| 2014 | (Spain) Granada | Ukraine; Oleksandr Petriv; Roman Bondaruk; Pavlo Korostylov | Russia; Leonid Ekimov; Alexei Klimov; Anton Gourianov | (Brazil) Brazil; Emerson Duarte; Júlio Almeida; José Carlos Batista |
| 2018 | (South Korea) Changwon | South Korea; Kim Young-min; Kim Jin-il; Jang Dae-kyu | France; Clément Bessaguet; Alban Pierson; Boris Artaud | China; Yao Zhaonan; Jin Yongde; Zhao Xiankun |

== World Championships, total medals up to 2006 ==
| Rank | Nation | Gold | Silver | Bronze | Total |
|---|---|---|---|---|---|
| 1 | Soviet Union | 10 | 6 | 3 | 19 |
| 2 | United States | 6 | 7 | 7 | 20 |
| 3 | South Korea | 4 | 2 | 3 | 9 |
| 4 | Finland | 3 | 4 | 4 | 11 |
| 5 | Russia | 2 | 3 | 0 | 5 |
| 6 | Czechoslovakia | 2 | 2 | 3 | 7 |
| 7 | Sweden | 2 | 2 | 1 | 5 |
| 8 | Switzerland | 1 | 4 | 1 | 6 |
| 9 | Norway | 1 | 2 | 0 | 3 |
| 10 | Mexico | 1 | 0 | 1 | 2 |
| 11 | China | 1 | 0 | 0 | 1 |
| 11 | Romania | 1 | 0 | 0 | 1 |
| 13 | Ukraine | 0 | 1 | 2 | 3 |
| 14 | France | 0 | 1 | 1 | 2 |
| 15 | Austria | 0 | 0 | 2 | 2 |
| 16 | Belarus | 0 | 0 | 1 | 1 |
| 16 | Cuba | 0 | 0 | 1 | 1 |
| 16 | East Germany | 0 | 0 | 1 | 1 |
| 16 | Great Britain | 0 | 0 | 1 | 1 |
| 16 | Hungary | 0 | 0 | 1 | 1 |
| 16 | North Korea | 0 | 0 | 1 | 1 |
| Totals (21 entries) | | 34 | 34 | 34 | 102 |

== Current world records ==
Current world records in 25 metre center-fire pistol
| Men (ISSF) | Individual | 596 | Christian Reitz (GER) | 31 July 2015 | Maribor (SLO) |
| Men (ISSF) | Teams | 1762 | Soviet Union (Ignatiuk, Kuzmins, Pyzhianov) | August 15, 1990 | Moscow (URS) |
| Men (CISM) | Individual | 597 | Yusuf Dikeç (TUR) | 2006 | Rena (NOR) |
| Men (CISM) | Teams | 1763 | China (Gao, Jin, Liu) | 2006 | Rena (NOR) |

== World champions ==
| Year | Venue | Individual | Team |
|---|---|---|---|
| 1947 | Stockholm | Torsten Ullman (SWE) | Finland |
| 1949 | Buenos Aires | Heinrich Keller (SUI) | United States |
| 1952 | Oslo | Harry Reeves (USA) | United States |
| 1954 | Caracas | Torsten Ullman (SWE) | Soviet Union |
| 1958 | Moscow | William McMillan (USA) | Czechoslovakia |
| 1962 | Cairo | Igor Rakalov (URS) | Soviet Union |
| 1966 | Wiesbaden | William Blankenship (USA) | United States |
| 1970 | Phoenix | Rafael Carpio (MEX) | Czechoslovakia |
| 1974 | Thun | Dan Iuga (ROU) | Soviet Union |
| 1978 | Seoul | Seppo Mäkinen (FIN) | Finland |
| 1982 | Caracas | Vladas Turla (URS) | Soviet Union |
| 1986 | Suhl | Oleg Tkachyov (URS) | Soviet Union |
| 1990 | Moscow | Sergei Pyzhianov (URS) | Soviet Union |
| 1994 | Milan | Pål Hembre (NOR) | Russia |
| 1998 | Barcelona | Park Byung Taek (KOR) | South Korea |
| 2002 | Lahti | Park Byung Taek (KOR) | South Korea |
| 2006 | Zagreb | Liu Yadong (CHN) | Russia |
| 2010 | Munich | Leonid Yekimov (RUS) | Brazil |
| 2014 | Granada | Yusuf Dikeç (TUR) | Ukraine |
