= Shooting at the 1996 Summer Olympics – Men's 25 metre rapid fire pistol =

Sports shooting at the Olympics

Men's 25 metre rapid fire pistol at the Games of the XXVI Olympiad
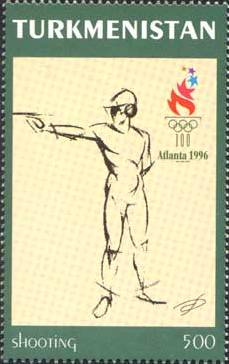
- Turkmenistan stamp commemorating 1996 Olympic shooting
- Venue: Wolf Creek Shooting Complex
- Dates: 23–24 July
- Competitors: 23 from 19 nations
- Winning score: 698.0 OR

Medalists
1st place, gold medalist(s)		Ralf Schumann; Germany
2nd place, silver medalist(s)		Emil Milev; Bulgaria
3rd place, bronze medalist(s)		Vladimir Vokhmyanin; Kazakhstan

The men's ISSF 25 meter rapid fire pistol was one of the fifteen shooting events at the 1996 Summer Olympics. Ralf Schumann defended his title from Barcelona, setting two new Olympic records. Schumann was the third man to successfully defend an Olympic title in the rapid fire pistol, and the first (and, as of the 2016 Games, only) to win three or more medals in the event; he would finish his career with three golds and five total medals. Emil Milev of Bulgaria (silver) and Vladimir Vokhmyanin of Kazakhstan (bronze) each won their nation's first medals in the event, though Vokhmyanin was a repeat bronze medalist (having also won for the Unified Team in 1992), making him the 10th man to win multiple medals in the event. There were 23 competitors from 19 nations. Nations had been limited to two shooters each since the 1952 Games.

== Background ==
This was the 20th appearance of what had been standardised in 1948 as the men's ISSF 25 meter rapid fire pistol event, the only event on the 2020 programme that traces back to 1896. The event has been held at every Summer Olympics except 1904 and 1928 (when no shooting events were held) and 1908; it was nominally open to women from 1968 to 1980, although very few women participated these years. The first five events were quite different, with some level of consistency finally beginning with the 1932 event—which, though it had differences from the 1924 competition, was roughly similar. The 1936 competition followed the 1932 one quite closely. The post-World War II event substantially altered the competition once again. The 1984 Games introduced women's-only shooting events, including the ISSF 25 meter pistol (though this is more similar to the non-Olympic men's ISSF 25 meter center-fire pistol than the rapid fire pistol).

Seven of the eight semifinalists from 1992 returned: gold medalist (and 1988 silver medalist) Ralf Schumann of Germany, silver medalist (and 1988 gold medalist) Afanasijs Kuzmins of Latvia, bronze medalist Vladimir Vokhmyanin of the Unified Team (now competing for Kazakhstan), fourth-place finisher Krzysztof Kucharczyk of Poland, fifth-place finisher (and 1988 finalist) John McNally of the United States, sixth-place finisher Miroslav Ignatiuk of the Unified Team (now competing for Ukraine), and eighth-place finisher (and 1988 finalist) Bernardo Tovar of Colombia. Kucharczyk had won the 1994 world championship, with Emil Milev of Bulgaria second and Schumann (the 1990 world champion) third.

Croatia, Kazakhstan, Moldova, and Ukraine each made their debut in the event. The United States made its 17th appearance, most of any nation.

== Competition format ==
The competition format dropped the three-round format used in 1992 and went back to a two-round (qualifying round and final) format, as in 1988.

The qualifying round from 1988 onward was essentially the same as the full competition format from 1948–1984. Each shooter fired 60 shots. These were done in two courses of 30; each course consisted of two stages of 15; each stage consisted of three series of 5. In each stage, the time limit for each series was 8 seconds for the first, 6 seconds for the second, and 4 seconds for the third.

The 1988 tournament had added a two-series final for the top eight shooters; the 1992 competition broke that down to a four-series semifinal for the top eight and two-series final for the top four. In 1996, the top eight once again advanced to the final.

In the final, each shooter fired two five-shot series at 4 seconds. Scoring in the final was to 1/10 of a point, with each shot worth up to 10.9 points (for a final round maximum of 109, and total maximum of 709). It was the first time scoring to 1/10 of a point was done in the Olympic rapid fire pistol.

The 1992 competition had introduced round targets rather than the silhouettes used from 1948 to 1988 as well as many pre-World War II versions of the event. Score, rather than hits, had been used as the primary ranking method since 1960.

== Records ==
Prior to the competition, the existing world and Olympic records were as follows.

Two courses (60 shots, 600 maximum)

Qualifying (60 shots)
World record	Ralf Schumann (GER)	597	Munich, Germany	14 June 1995
Olympic record	Ralf Schumann (GER)	594	Barcelona, Spain	29–30 July 1992

Qualifying plus final (70 shots)
World record	Ralf Schumann (GER)	699.7	Barcelona, Spain	8 June 1994
Olympic record	New format			

Ralf Schumann broke his own Olympic record in the qualifying round with 596 points. His total of 698.0 points was the inaugural record for the new format.

== Schedule ==
Date	Time	Round
Tuesday, 23 July 1996		Qualifying: Course 1
Wednesday, 24 July 1996	14:30	Qualifying: Course 2 Final

== Results ==
=== Qualifying ===
Rank	Shooter	Nation	Course 1	Course 2	Total	Notes
1	Ralf Schumann	Germany	298	298	596	Q, OR
2	Emil Milev	Bulgaria	294	296	590	Q
3	Krzysztof Kucharczyk	Poland	292	297	589	Q
3	Vladimir Vokhmyanin	Kazakhstan	293	296	589	Q
5	Meng Gang	China	291	296	587	Q
6	Daniel Leonhard	Germany	293	293	586	Q
6	Ghenadie Lisoconi	Moldova	295	291	586	Q
6	Lajos Pálinkás	Hungary	290	296	586	Q
9	Myroslav Ihnatyuk	Ukraine	295	291	586	
10	Afanasijs Kuzmins	Latvia	290	295	585	
11	Iulian Raicea	Romania	292	292	584	
12	Michel Ansermet	Switzerland	293	290	583	
12	Tomohiro Kida	Japan	290	293	583	
12	John McNally	United States	288	295	583	
12	Urs Tobler	Switzerland	290	293	583	
16	Sabin Chaushev	Bulgaria	286	296	582	
16	Roman Špirelja	Croatia	291	291	582	
18	Roger Mar	United States	292	289	581	
19	Petri Eteläniemi	Finland	290	289	579	
20	Anders Lau	Denmark	292	286	578	
21	Franck Dumoulin	France	285	290	575	
21	Patrick Murray	Australia	285	290	575	
23	Bernardo Tovar	Colombia	279	286	565	

=== Final ===
Rank	Shooter	Nation	Qualifying	Final	Total	Notes
1st place, gold medalist(s)	Ralf Schumann	Germany	596	102.0	698.0	OR
2nd place, silver medalist(s)	Emil Milev	Bulgaria	590	102.1	692.1	
3rd place, bronze medalist(s)	Vladimir Vokhmyanin	Kazakhstan	589	102.5	691.5	
4	Krzysztof Kucharczyk	Poland	589	101.5	690.5	
5	Meng Gang	China	587	100.1	687.1	
6	Ghenadie Lisoconi	Moldova	586	101.0	687.0	
7	Lajos Pálinkás	Hungary	586	99.9	685.9	
8	Daniel Leonhard	Germany	586	97.6	683.6	

== Sources ==
- Olympic Report Atlanta 1996 Volume III: The Competition Results (PDF).
