= Shooting at the 1972 Summer Olympics – Mixed 25 metre rapid fire pistol =

25 metre rapid fire pistol at the Games of the XX Olympiad
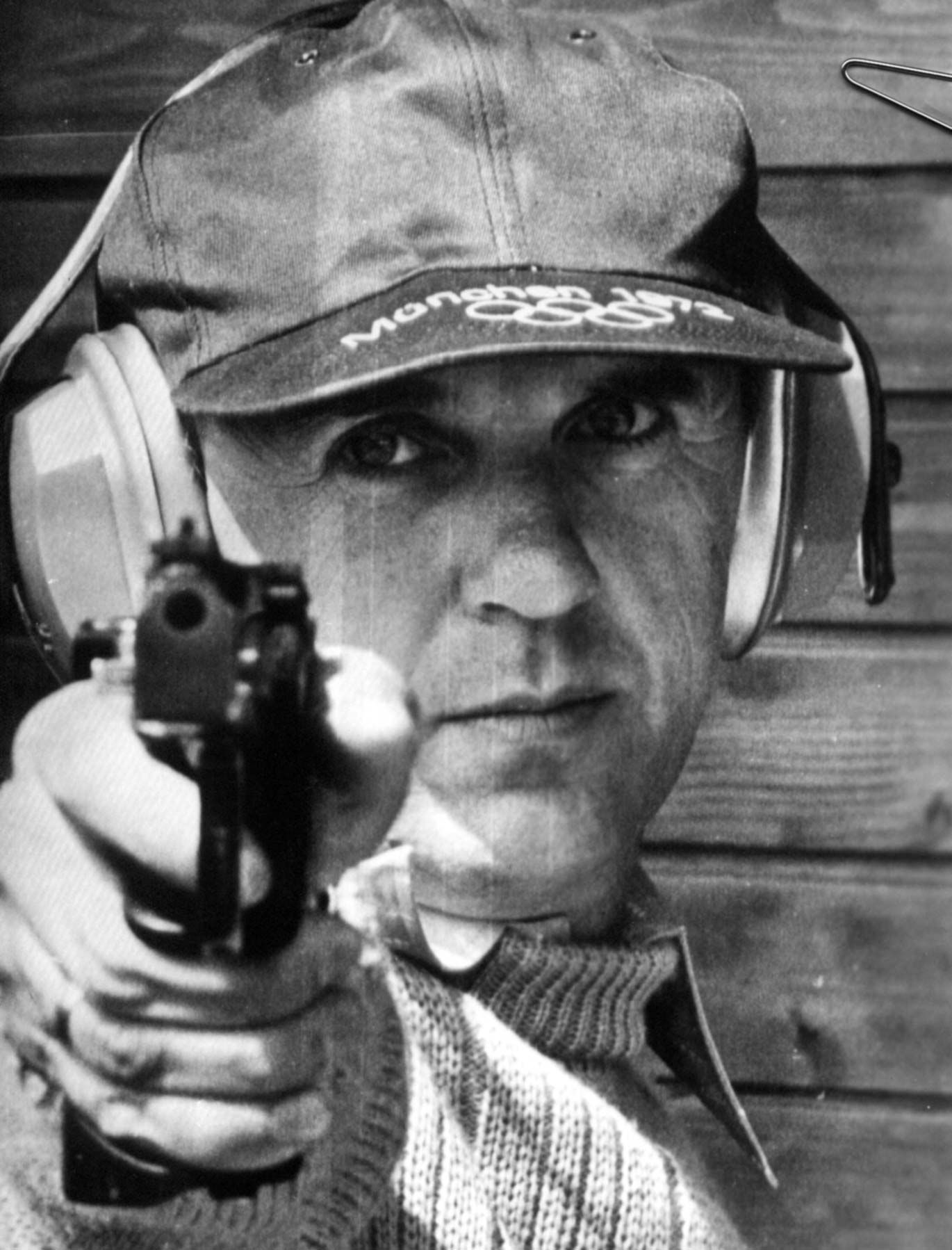
- Józef Zapędzki
- Venue: Schießanlage
- Dates: August 31 & September 1, 1972
- Competitors: 62 from 39 nations
- Winning score: 595 OR

Medalists
1st place, gold medalist(s)		Józef Zapędzki; Poland
2nd place, silver medalist(s)		Ladislav Falta; Czechoslovakia
3rd place, bronze medalist(s)		Viktor Torshin; Soviet Union

The ISSF 25 meter rapid fire pistol was a competition at the 1972 Summer Olympics. Józef Zapędzki of Poland set an Olympic record of 595 to defend his gold medal. He was the first shooter to defend the gold medal, in this event, since Károly Takács of Hungary defended his gold at the 1948 and 1952 games. Ladislav Falta of Czechoslovakia took silver. Viktor Torshin's bronze put the Soviet Union on the rapid fire pistol podium for the fourth time in five Games. There were 62 competitors from 39 nations. The nations had been limited to two shooters each since the 1952 Games.

As with all shooting events from 1968 to 1980, this event was open to both men and women.

== Background ==
This was the 14th appearance of what had been standardised in 1948 as the men's ISSF 25 meter rapid fire pistol event, the only event on the 2020 programme that traces back to 1896. The event has been held at every Summer Olympics except 1904 and 1928 (when no shooting events were held) and 1908; it was open to women from 1968 to 1980. The first five events were quite different, with some level of consistency finally beginning with the 1932 event—which, though it had differences from the 1924 competition, was roughly similar. The 1936 competition followed the 1932 one quite closely. The post-World War II event substantially altered the competition once again.

Four of the top 10 shooters from 1968 returned: gold medalist Józef Zapędzki of Poland, fourth-place finisher Christian Düring of East Germany, eighth-place finisher Giovanni Liverzani of Italy, and tenth-place finisher Ladislav Falta of Czechoslovakia. Liverzani was the reigning (1970) world champion, with Falta the runner-up. 1952 silver medalist Szilárd Kun of Hungary competed once again, as did 1960 gold medalist William McMillan of the United States.

Luxembourg, New Zealand, San Marino, and the Virgin Islands each made their debut in the event. The United States made its 12th appearance in the event, most of any nation.

== Competition format ==
The competition format followed the 1948 format, now very close to the modern rapid fire pistol competition after significant variation before World War II. Each shooter fired 60 shots. These were done in two courses of 30; each course consisted of two stages of 15; each stage consisted of three series of 5. In each stage, the time limit for each series was 8 seconds for the first, 6 seconds for the second, and 4 seconds for the third.

A holdover from the previous Games was that full-body silhouettes, rather than round targets, continued to be used; however, scoring rings had been added so that now each shot was scored up to 10 rather than being strictly hit or miss.

One change from 1948 to 1956 was that hits were no longer the primary measurement of success. As in 1960–1968, ranking was done by score, regardless of hits.

== Records ==
Prior to the competition, the existing world and Olympic records were as follows.

World record		598		
Olympic record	Józef Zapędzki (POL)	593	Mexico City, Mexico	22–23 October 1968

Józef Zapędzki beat his own Olympic record with 595 points. Ladislav Falta (at 594 points) was also above the old record, while Viktor Torshin matched it.

== Schedule ==
Date	Time	Round
Thursday, 31 August 1972	9:00	Course 1
Friday, 1 September 1972	9:00	Course 2

== Results ==
Rank	Shooter	Nation	8 seconds	6 seconds	4 seconds	Total	Notes
1st place, gold medalist(s)	Józef Zapędzki	Poland	200	199	196	595	OR
2nd place, silver medalist(s)	Ladislav Falta	Czechoslovakia	200	197	197	594	
3rd place, bronze medalist(s)	Viktor Torshin	Soviet Union	199	197	197	593	
4	Paul Buser	Switzerland	198	197	197	592	
5	Jaime González	Spain	196	200	196	592	
6	Giovanni Liverzani	Italy	199	197	195	591	
7	Dencho Denev	Bulgaria	198	196	196	590	
8	Gerhard Petritsch	Austria	198	196	196	590	
9	Vladimír Hurt	Czechoslovakia	200	198	192	590	
10	Jim McNally	United States	195	198	196	589	
11	Helmut Seeger	West Germany	198	197	194	589	
12	Daniel Iuga	Romania	198	196	195	589	
13	Immo Huhtinen	Finland	199	198	192	589	
14	Zbigniew Fedyczak	Poland	197	199	191	587	
15	Damián Cerdá	Spain	196	196	194	586	
16	Erwin Glock	West Germany	198	197	191	586	
17	Thor-Øistein Endsjø	Norway	199	196	191	586	
18	Alexander Taransky	Australia	198	197	191	586	
19	John Cooke	Great Britain	197	192	196	585	
20	Arturo Costa	Cuba	194	194	195	583	
21	Christian Düring	East Germany	197	194	192	583	
22	Solos Nalampoon	Thailand	197	196	190	583	
23	Szilárd Kun	Hungary	198	195	190	583	
24	Igor Bakalov	Soviet Union	200	199	184	583	
25	Ion Tripșa	Romania	197	198	187	582	
26	Jean Baumann	France	195	196	191	582	
27	Seppo Mäkinen	Finland	199	197	186	582	
28	Bruce McMillan	New Zealand	197	195	190	582	
29	Jules Sobrian	Canada	195	197	190	582	
30	Kanji Kubo	Japan	194	197	191	582	
31	Curt Andersson	Sweden	199	197	186	582	
32	Hubert Garschall	Austria	198	196	187	581	
33	Takeo Kamachi	Japan	199	199	182	580	
34	Tony Clark	Great Britain	197	190	192	579	
35	Jean-Richard Germont	France	199	195	185	579	
36	André Antunes	Portugal	189	197	192	578	
37	Homero Laddaga	Mexico	197	192	189	578	
38	Michel Braun	Luxembourg	197	196	184	577	
39	Tüdeviin Myagmarjav	Mongolia	195	195	187	577	
40	Luis Colina	Colombia	193	196	188	577	
41	William Hare	Canada	195	193	189	577	
42	Ivan Mandov	Bulgaria	198	199	179	576	
43	Víctor Francis	Venezuela	192	193	188	573	
44	Lennart Christensen	Denmark	194	192	187	573	
45	Bill McMillan	United States	199	195	178	572	
46	Rangsit Yanothai	Thailand	196	187	188	571	
47	Bruno Morri	San Marino	195	191	184	570	
48	Nelson Torno	Argentina	190	194	185	569	
49	Roberto Ferraris	Italy	197	196	175	568	
50	Víctor Castellanos	Guatemala	192	191	184	567	
51	Guillermo Martínez	Colombia	192	195	177	564	
52	Simon González	Puerto Rico	193	192	178	563	
53	Rafael Recto	Philippines	188	185	180	553	
54	Mario Sánchez	Mexico	197	187	167	551	
55	Leonard Bull	Kenya	191	186	171	548	
56	José Luis Rosales	El Salvador	192	186	165	543	
57	Tom Ong	Philippines	185	180	168	533	
58	Peter Laurence	Kenya	189	172	172	533	
59	Robert McAuliffe	Virgin Islands	180	182	132	494	
60	Kurt Rey	Switzerland	196	147	97	440	
—	Roberto Tamagnini	San Marino	DNF				
—	Fernando Miranda	Puerto Rico	DNF				
—	Alejandro Guerra	Cuba	DNS				
—	Tserenjav Ulziibaiar	Mongolia	DNS				
—	Yun Gwon Chai	North Korea	DNS				
