= Shooting at the 2004 Summer Olympics – Men's 25 metre rapid fire pistol =

Sports shooting at the Olympics

Men's 25 metre rapid fire pistol at the Games of the XXVIII Olympiad
- Shooting pictogram
- Venue: Markopoulo Olympic Shooting Centre
- Date: 21 August 2004
- Competitors: 17 from 14 nations
- Winning score: 694.9

Medalists
1st place, gold medalist(s)		Ralf Schumann	Germany
2nd place, silver medalist(s)		Sergei Polyakov	Russia
3rd place, bronze medalist(s)		Sergei Alifirenko	Russia

The men's ISSF 25 meter rapid fire pistol competition at the 2004 Summer Olympics was held on 21 August at the Markopoulo Olympic Shooting Centre near Athens, Greece. This was the last Olympic competition before the major rule changes that took place on 1 January 2005, and which lowered the results of the event. There were 17 competitors from 14 nations.

Germany's world number one shooter Ralf Schumann produced the highest final round ever with 102.9 to easily get the best aggregate score of 694.9 and his third Olympic gold medal in rapid fire pistol shooting, becoming the first in the event's history to do so. Russia's Sergei Polyakov took the silver with 692.7, while he enjoyed his countryman and defending Olympic champion Sergei Alifirenko (692.3) rounding out the podium with a bronze in a remarkable 2–3 finish. Earlier in the prelims, the top three were all tied for the first seed at 592 points.

Schumann's third win was Germany's fourth victory in the event (Cornelius van Oyen had won in 1936), most of any nation even not counting East Germany's one win in 1976. Indeed, Schumann personally matched the success of the next-best nation, the United States, at three golds and a silver. Alifirenko was the 11th man to win multiple medals in the event.

== Background ==
This was the 22nd appearance of what had been standardised in 1948 as the men's ISSF 25 meter rapid fire pistol event, the only event on the 2020 programme that traces back to 1896. The event has been held at every Summer Olympics except 1904 and 1928 (when no shooting events were held) and 1908; it was nominally open to women from 1968 to 1980, although very few women participated these years. The first five events were quite different, with some level of consistency finally beginning with the 1932 event—which, though it had differences from the 1924 competition, was roughly similar. The 1936 competition followed the 1932 one quite closely. The post-World War II event substantially altered the competition once again. The 1984 Games introduced women's-only shooting events, including the ISSF 25 meter pistol (though this is more similar to the non-Olympic men's ISSF 25 meter center-fire pistol than the rapid fire pistol).

Five of the eight finalists from 2000 returned: gold medalist Sergei Alifirenko of Russia, bronze medalist Iulian Raicea of Romania, fourth-place finisher Emil Milev of Bulgaria, fifth-place finisher (and 1992 and 1996 gold and 1988 silver medalist) Ralf Schumann of Germany, and eighth-place finisher (and 1988 gold and 1992 silver medalist) Afanasijs Kuzmins of Latvia. Schumann had finished second at the 2002 world championships to his countryman Marco Spangenberg, but was still favored in Athens.

For the second time, no nation made its debut in the event. Hungary made its 16th appearance, most of any nation competing in Athens but 2 appearances fewer than the United States (missing the event for the first time since the 1980 boycott).

== Qualification ==
Each National Olympic Committee (NOC) could enter up to two shooters if the NOC earned enough quota sports or had enough crossover-qualified shooters. To compete, a shooter needed a quota spot and to achieve a Minimum Qualification Score (MQS). Once a shooter was using a quota spot in any shooting event, they could enter any other shooting event for which they had achieved the MQS as well (a crossover qualification). There were 16 quota spots available for the rapid fire pistol: 4 at the 2002 World Cup events, 2 at the 2002 World Championship, 4 at the 2003 World Cup events, 2 at the 2003 European Championships, 1 each at the 2003 Pan American Games, 2003 Oceania Championships, and 2004 Asian Championships, and 1 wild card (which went to Romania's Iulian Raicea, the 2000 bronze medalist). In 2004, one crossover qualification was used in the rapid fire pistol: Kim Hyon-ung of North Korea had qualified and used a quota spot in the 50 metre pistol and also achieved the rapid fire pistol MQS; he competed in both events.

== Competition format ==
The competition format continued to use the two-round (qualifying round and final) format, as in 1988 and since 1996.

The qualifying round from 1988 onward was essentially the same as the full competition format from 1948–1984. Each shooter fired 60 shots. These were done in two courses of 30; each course consisted of two stages of 15; each stage consisted of three series of 5. In each stage, the time limit for each series was 8 seconds for the first, 6 seconds for the second, and 4 seconds for the third.

The 1988 tournament had added a two-series final for the top eight shooters; the 1992 competition broke that down to a four-series semifinal for the top eight and two-series final for the top four. In 1996 and 2000, the top eight once again advanced to the final. The 2004 version reduced the number of finalists to six.

In the final, each shooter fired two five-shot series at 4 seconds. Scoring in the final was to 1/10 of a point, with each shot worth up to 10.9 points (for a final round maximum of 109, and total maximum of 709).

The 1992 competition had introduced round targets rather than the silhouettes used from 1948 to 1988 as well as many pre-World War II versions of the event. Score, rather than hits, had been used as the primary ranking method since 1960.

== Records ==
Prior to this competition, the existing world and Olympic records were as follows.

Qualifying records
World record	Ralf Schumann (GER)	597	Munich, Germany	14 June 1995
Olympic record	Ralf Schumann (GER)	596	Atlanta, United States	25 July 1996

Final records
World record	Ralf Schumann (GER)	699.7 (596+103.7)	Barcelona, Spain	8 June 1994
Olympic record	Ralf Schumann (GER)	698.0 (596+102.0)	Atlanta, United States	25 July 1996

== Schedule ==
Date	Time	Round
Saturday, 21 August 2004	9:00; 11:20; 14:30	Qualifying: Course 1 Qualifying: Course 2 Final

== Results ==
=== Qualifying ===
Rank	Shooter	Nation	Course 1				Course 2				Total	Notes
Rank	Shooter	Nation	8 seconds	6 seconds	4 seconds	Total	8 seconds	6 seconds	4 seconds	Total	Total	Notes
1	Sergei Alifirenko	Russia	98	99	97	294	100	99	99	298	592	Q
2	Sergei Polyakov	Russia	99	99	98	296	100	99	97	296	592	Q
3	Ralf Schumann	Germany	99	99	99	297	99	99	97	295	592	Q
4	Iulian Raicea	Romania	99	96	99	294	100	99	95	294	588	Q
5	Oleg Tkachov	Ukraine	99	99	99	297	99	99	92	290	587	Q
6	Chen Yongqiang	China	100	95	94	289	100	100	97	297	586	Q
7	Zhang Penghui	China	98	97	96	291	96	100	98	294	585	
8	Leuris Pupo	Cuba	98	98	93	289	100	98	98	296	585	
9	Emil Milev	Bulgaria	96	98	94	288	100	98	96	294	582	
10	Marco Spangenberg	Germany	99	98	95	292	97	99	93	289	581	
11	Kang Hyung-chul	South Korea	96	98	93	287	98	99	96	293	580	
12	Niki Marty	Switzerland	98	97	94	289	98	99	91	288	577	
12	Lajos Pálinkás	Hungary	100	96	91	287	96	98	96	290	577	
14	Afanasijs Kuzmins	Latvia	94	90	98	282	100	96	96	292	574	
15	Shuji Tazawa	Japan	95	96	96	287	99	93	94	286	573	
16	Kim Hyon-ung	North Korea	97	97	88	282	98	98	94	290	572	
17	Bruce Quick	Australia	97	97	89	283	98	99	91	288	571	

=== Final ===
Rank	Shooter	Nation	Qualifying	Final			Total
Rank	Shooter	Nation	Qualifying	Series 1	Series 2	Total	Total
1st place, gold medalist(s)	Ralf Schumann	Germany	592	51.4	51.5	102.9	694.9
2nd place, silver medalist(s)	Sergei Polyakov	Russia	592	51.7	49.0	100.7	692.7
3rd place, bronze medalist(s)	Sergei Alifirenko	Russia	592	49.9	50.4	100.3	692.3
4	Oleg Tkachov	Ukraine	587	50.6	51.1	101.7	688.7
5	Iulian Raicea	Romania	588	49.4	50.2	99.6	687.6
6	Chen Yongqiang	China	586	46.9	50.9	97.8	683.8
