= Shooting at the 2000 Summer Olympics – Men's 25 metre rapid fire pistol =

Sports shooting at the Olympics

Men's 25 metre rapid fire pistol at the Games of the XXVII Olympiad
- Shooting pictogram
- Venue: Sydney International Shooting Centre
- Date: 20 September 2000; 21 September 2000
- Competitors: 20 from 17 nations
- Winning score: 687.6

Medalists
1st place, gold medalist(s)		Sergei Alifirenko; Russia
2nd place, silver medalist(s)		Michel Ansermet; Switzerland
3rd place, bronze medalist(s)		Iulian Raicea; Romania

The men's ISSF 25 meter rapid fire pistol competition at the 2000 Summer Olympics was held on 20 and 21 September. There were 20 competitors from 17 nations. Nations had been limited to two shooters each since the 1952 Games. The event was won by Sergei Alifirenko of Russia, the nation's first medal independent of the Soviet Union. Michel Ansermet's silver was Switzerland's first medal in the event since 1920; Iulian Raicea's bronze was Romania's first since 1984.

== Background ==
This was the 21st appearance of what had been standardised in 1948 as the men's ISSF 25 meter rapid fire pistol event, the only event on the 2020 programme that traces back to 1896. The event has been held at every Summer Olympics except 1904 and 1928 (when no shooting events were held) and 1908; it was nominally open to women from 1968 to 1980, although very few women participated these years. The first five events were quite different, with some level of consistency finally beginning with the 1932 event—which, though it had differences from the 1924 competition, was roughly similar. The 1936 competition followed the 1932 one quite closely. The post-World War II event substantially altered the competition once again. The 1984 Games introduced women's-only shooting events, including the ISSF 25 meter pistol (though this is more similar to the non-Olympic men's ISSF 25 meter center-fire pistol than the rapid fire pistol).

Six of the eight finalists from 1996 returned: two-time gold medalist (and 1988 silver medalist Ralf Schumann of Germany, silver medalist Emil Milev of Bulgaria, two-time bronze medalist Vladimir Vokhmyanin of Kazakhstan, two-time fourth-place finisher Krzysztof Kucharczyk of Poland, seventh-place finisher Lajos Pálinkás of Hungary, and eighth-place finisher Daniel Leonhard of Germany. Schumann had won the world championship again in 1998 (after winning in 1990 and finishing third in 1994) and held the world records for both qualifying and total; he was heavily favored in this event. Leonhard and Romanian Iulian Raicea had finished second and third at the 1998 worlds.

Belarus made its debut in the event. The United States made its 18th appearance, most of any nation.

== Competition format ==
The competition format continued to use the two-round (qualifying round and final) format, as in 1988 and 1996.

The qualifying round from 1988 onward was essentially the same as the full competition format from 1948–1984. Each shooter fired 60 shots. These were done in two courses of 30; each course consisted of two stages of 15; each stage consisted of three series of 5. In each stage, the time limit for each series was 8 seconds for the first, 6 seconds for the second, and 4 seconds for the third.

The 1988 tournament had added a two-series final for the top eight shooters; the 1992 competition broke that down to a four-series semifinal for the top eight and two-series final for the top four. In 1996 and 2000, the top eight once again advanced to the final.

In the final, each shooter fired two five-shot series at 4 seconds. Scoring in the final was to 1/10 of a point, with each shot worth up to 10.9 points (for a final round maximum of 109, and total maximum of 709).

The 1992 competition had introduced round targets rather than the silhouettes used from 1948 to 1988 as well as many pre-World War II versions of the event. Score, rather than hits, had been used as the primary ranking method since 1960.

== Records ==
The existing world and Olympic records were as follows.

Qualifying records
World record	Ralf Schumann (GER)	597	Munich, Germany	14 June 1995
Olympic record	Ralf Schumann (GER)	596	Atlanta, United States	25 July 1996

Final records
World record	Ralf Schumann (GER)	699.7	Barcelona, Spain	8 June 1994
Olympic record	Ralf Schumann (GER)	698.0	Atlanta, United States	25 July 1996

== Schedule ==
Date	Time	Round
Wednesday, 20 September 2000	10:00	Qualifying: Course 1
Thursday, 21 September 2000	10:00	Qualifying: Course 2 Final

== Results ==
=== Qualifying ===
Two-time defending champion and heavy favorite Schumann received a two-point penalty for unsuccessfully protesting a score of 8 on a shot, barely qualifying for the final and putting him 3 points behind the three-way tie for the lead (a very difficult score to make up with only 10 shots in the final).

Rank	Shooter	Nation	Course 1	Course 2	Total	Notes
1	Iulian Raicea	Romania	291	296	587	Q
2	Sergei Alifirenko	Russia	293	294	587	Q
3	Michel Ansermet	Switzerland	295	292	587	Q
4	Emil Milev	Bulgaria	290	296	586	Q
5	Oleg Khvatsovas	Belarus	295	291	586	Q
6	Afanasijs Kuzmins	Latvia	290	295	585	Q
7	Ralf Schumann	Germany	289	295	584	Q 4-second series, course 2: 100; 2 points deducted (scoring protest turned down)
8	Krzysztof Kucharczyk	Poland	292	292	584	Q 4-second series, course 2: 100
9	Daniel Leonhard	Germany	291	293	584	4-second series, course 2: 95
9	Leuris Pupo	Cuba	293	291	584	4-second series, course 2: 95
11	Iulică Cazan	Romania	292	291	583	
12	István Jambrik	Hungary	293	287	580	
12	Vladimir Vokhmyanin	Kazakhstan	289	291	580	
14	Lajos Pálinkás	Hungary	291	288	579	
15	John McNally	United States	285	293	578	
15	Roman Špirelja	Croatia	290	288	578	
17	Nguyễn Trung Hiếu	Vietnam	288	289	577	
18	Daniel César Felizia	Argentina	288	283	571	
18	Li Hao Jian	Hong Kong	284	287	571	
20	David Chapman	Australia	287	270	557	
—	Zuo Zhong	China	DNS			

=== Final ===
Schumann's 2-point penalty ultimately cost him the bronze medal; if his protest had been successful, however, he would have been in position to receive silver. Alifirenko's 100.6 gave him the gold medal regardless.

Rank	Shooter	Nation	Qualifying	Final			Total
Rank	Shooter	Nation	Qualifying	Series 1	Series 2	Total	Total
1st place, gold medalist(s)	Sergei Alifirenko	Russia	587	51.0	49.6	100.6	687.6
2nd place, silver medalist(s)	Michel Ansermet	Switzerland	587	49.5	49.6	99.1	686.1
3rd place, bronze medalist(s)	Iulian Raicea	Romania	587	49.6	48.0	97.6	684.6
4	Emil Milev	Bulgaria	586	48.8	49.7	98.5	684.5
5	Ralf Schumann	Germany	584	49.2	50.1	99.3	683.3
6	Oleg Khvatsovas	Belarus	586	46.6	49.8	96.4	682.4
7	Krzysztof Kucharczyk	Poland	584	48.1	50.1	98.2	682.2
8	Afanasijs Kuzmins	Latvia	585	50.4	45.9	96.3	681.3

== Sources ==
- Official Report of the XXVII Olympiad — Shooting (PDF).
