= Sampo Voutilainen =

Finnish pistol shooter (born 1997)

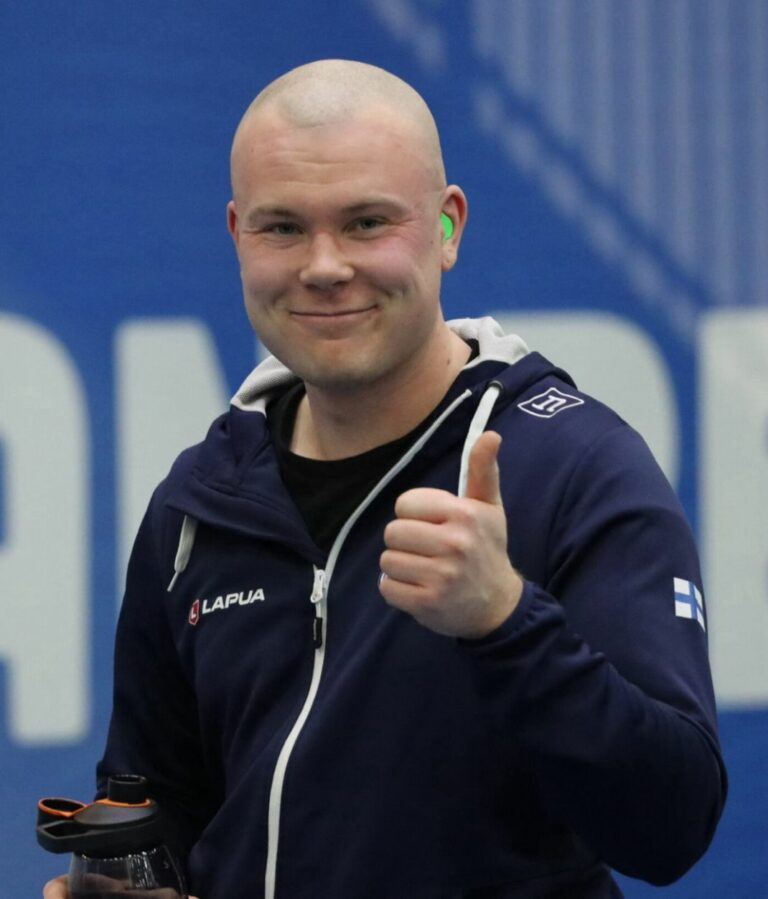
- Picture Lassi Palo

Personal information
- Full name: Sampo Pekka Vilhelm Voutilainen
- Born: 27 August 1997 (age 29) Siilinjärvi, Finland
- Years active: 2024–present

Sport
- Sport: Shooting
- Club: Ylivieskan Kuula; SGi Ludwigsburg
- Coached by: Joonas Kallio
Medal record
Men's shooting
Representing Finland
World Championships
Bronze medal – third place	2026 Doha	25 m Standard pistol
European Championships
Bronze medal – third place	2025 Châteauroux	25 m Standard Pistol
Bronze medal – third place	2026 Osijek	25 m Center-Fire Pistol
World Military Championships
Silver medal – second place	2025 Elverum	25 m Center-Fire Pistol

Sampo Voutilainen (born 29 August 1997) is a Finnish ISSF pistol shooter, specializing in 10 m air pistol and a range of 25 m pistol disciplines. He represents Ylivieskan Kuula and has been a member of the Finnish national team since 2025. Since making his international debut in late 2024, he has won medals at the European Championships, World Military Championships and World Championships.

== Early life ==
Voutilainen is from Siilinjärvi and began recreational shooting at age 13. He trained more systematically during his military service, later joining the Kainuu Brigade and developing his skills under coach Joonas Kallio from 2020–21 onward. He shifted to targeted training in pistol shooting in autumn 2023.

== Competitive career ==
=== 2024: National breakthrough and international debut ===
Voutilainen began his competitive career in the summer of 2024, winning gold in the 25 m sport and standard pistol events and silver in the 25 m center-fire and 50 m free pistol events at the Finnish Championships.

He made his international debut later that year at the Hungarian Open in Budapest, where he reached the 10 m air pistol final and placed sixth in the mixed team event. Following further national-level successes, he met the qualification criteria for the 2025 European Championships and was named to the Finnish national team.

=== 2025: National and international achievements ===
Voutilainen opened the 2025 season with several strong air pistol performances at the Swedish Cup, achieving multiple top-three results in individual events and earning bronze in the mixed team competition. At the European Championship demonstration event in Lohja he set a new personal best and national competition record, securing his position on the Finnish team for the European Championships in Osijek. There he competed in the 10 m air pistol and finished 29th in qualification.

At the H&N World Cup in Munich, Voutilainen finished 15th with 578 points. At the 2025 Finnish 10 m Air Pistol Championships in Turku, Voutilainen won individual gold and team gold for Ylivieskan Kuula. He later improved his international standing with a 585 air-pistol qualification score at the Grand Prix of Liberation in Plzeň, reaching the final, and added podium finishes in the 25 m standard and center-fire pistol events.

Voutilainen won silver in the 25 m center-fire pistol at the 2025 World Military Shooting Championship CISM, finishing behind Olympic champion Pavlo Korostylov. It is Finland's first individual pistol medal at the event since 1991. He added further podium finishes at the 2025 Lapua European Cup in Tallinn, placing third in the standard pistol and contributing to Finland's team and mixed-team medals.

At the European Championships in Châteauroux, he won bronze in the 25 m standard pistol with a Finnish record score of 575. It was Finland's first individual pistol medal since Seppo Mäkinen's 1997 European Championship bronze. He also achieved two fifth-place finishes, in the center-fire pistol and the 50 m pistol.

At the Finnish 25 m and 50 m championships in August 2025, Voutilainen won four of five men's titles and set personal records in several pistol events. In October 2025, Voutilainen joined SGi Ludwigsburg in the 1. Bundesliga Luftpistole, the highest competition class of the German Shooting and Archery Federation.

At the ISSF World Championships in Cairo, his best results were twelfth places with the 25 m standard pistol and the 25 m center-fire pistol.

He was voted the best athlete of the year 2025 by his sports club, which had itself become the most successful sports club in Northern Finland.

=== 2026: Current competitions and outlook ===
In January 2026, Voutilainen won all three men's 10 m air pistol events at the Swedish Cup in Sävsjö, which qualified him for the European Championships. He also won first place in the 10 m air pistol event of the Winter Grand Prix in Lohja. At the Kainuu Sports Gala, which honoured successful athletes from this eastern region of Finland, Voutilainen was named Military Athlete of the Year 2025. He was also named the province's best athlete at the Central Ostrobothnia Sports Gala in Kokkola. At the H&N World Cup in Munich, Voutilainen finished 10th with 580 points.

He finished sixth in the men's 10 m air pistol event at the European 10 m Championships in Yerevan in March 2026. At the 38th ISAS (International Season Start for Shooters) in Dortmund that same month, he took second place in the final with the 10-meter air pistol. In May 2026, Voutilainen won bronze in the men's 25 m standard pistol at the European 25/50 m Championships in Osijek with a score of 584 points. Two months later, he won the 50m pistol Finnish championship with a score of 566. In November, Voutilainen won the bronze medal in the men's 25 m standard pistol event at the 2026 ISSF World Shooting Championships in Doha, scoring 574 points.

His stated long-term objective is qualification for the 2028 Summer Olympics in Los Angeles, which feature the Olympic disciplines of 10 m air pistol and 25 m rapid fire pistol. The Finnish broadcaster Yle describes how he prepares for this through meditation and various visualization exercises in a feature profile of the athlete.
