= Shooting at the 1968 Summer Olympics – Mixed 25 metre rapid fire pistol =

Olympic shooting event

Mixed 25 metre rapid fire pistol at the Games of the XIX Olympiad
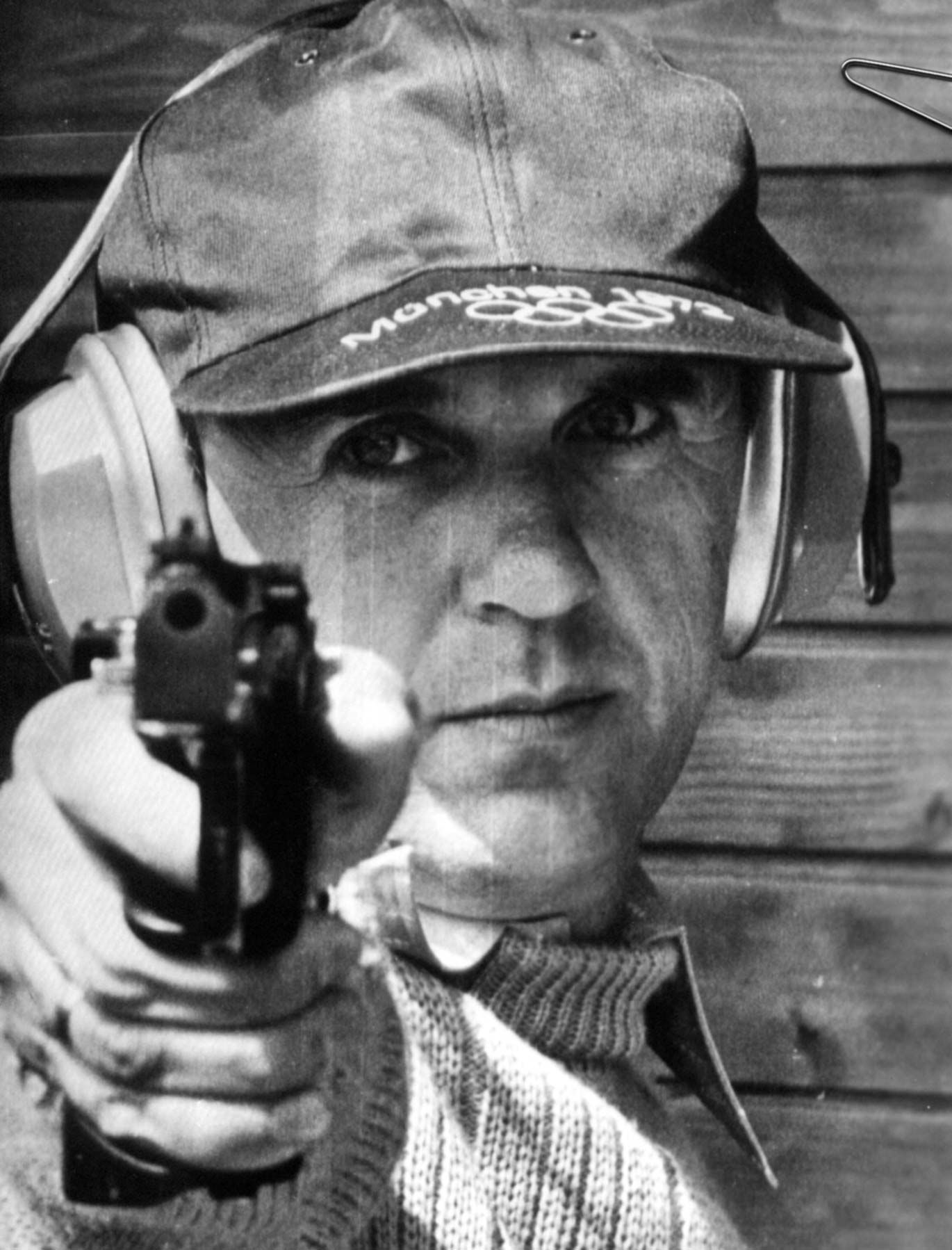
- Józef Zapędzki
- Venue: Vicente Suárez Shooting Range
- Dates: 22–23 October 1968
- Competitors: 56 from 34 nations
- Winning score: 593 OR

Medalists
| 1st place, gold medalist(s) | | Józef Zapędzki; Poland |
| 2nd place, silver medalist(s) | | Marcel Roșca; Romania |
| 3rd place, bronze medalist(s) | | Renart Suleymanov; Soviet Union |

The mixed (or "open") ISSF 25 meter rapid fire pistol was a shooting sports event held as part of the Shooting at the 1968 Summer Olympics programme. It was the 13th appearance of the event. The competition was held on 22 to 23 October 1968 at the Vicente Suárez Shooting Range in Mexico City. 56 shooters from 34 nations competed. Nations had been limited to two shooters each since the 1952 Games. The event was won by Józef Zapędzki of Poland, the nation's first medal in the event and the first of two victories of Zapędzki (who would repeat in 1972). Marcel Roșca's silver put Romania on the rapid fire pistol podium for the fourth time in five Games. Renart Suleymanov of the Soviet Union took bronze.

Zapędzki received a replica of the Pyramid of the Sun for winning the event.

== Background ==
This was the 13th appearance of what had been standardised in 1948 as the men's ISSF 25 meter rapid fire pistol event, the only event on the 2020 programme that traces back to 1896. The event has been held at every Summer Olympics except 1904 and 1928 (when no shooting events were held) and 1908; it was nominally open to women from 1968 to 1980, although very few women participated these years. There is no women's equivalent on the Olympic programme, as of 2021. The first five events were quite different, with some level of consistency finally beginning with the 1932 event—which, though it had differences from the 1924 competition, was roughly similar. The 1936 competition followed the 1932 one quite closely. The post-World War II event substantially altered the competition once again.

Six of the top 10 shooters from 1964 returned: gold medalist (and 1960 silver medalist and top-five finisher in 1952 and 1956) Pentti Linnosvuo of Finland, bronze medalist Lubomír Nácovský of Czechoslovakia, fifth-place finisher (and 1952 silver medalist) Szilárd Kun of Hungary, sixth-place finisher Marcel Roșca of Romania, ninth-place finisher Ladislav Falta of Czechoslovakia, and tenth-place finisher Tony Clark of Great Britain. The 1960 gold medalist, William McMillan of the United States, who had finished 12th in 1964, also returned. The 1966 world championship podium (champion Virgil Atanasiu of Romania, runner-up Józef Zapędzki of Poland, and third-place finisher Renart Suleymanov of the Soviet Union) were all competing in Mexico City.

El Salvador, Hong Kong, Mongolia, Singapore, and Vietnam each made their debut in the event; East and West Germany competed separately for the first time. The United States made its 11th appearance in the event, most of any nation.

Popular pistols were the Swiss Hammerli and the German Walther.

== Competition format ==
The competition format followed the 1948 format, now very close to the modern rapid fire pistol competition after significant variation before World War II. Each shooter fired 60 shots. These were done in two courses of 30; each course consisted of two stages of 15; each stage consisted of three series of 5. In each stage, the time limit for each series was 8 seconds for the first, 6 seconds for the second, and 4 seconds for the third.

A holdover from the previous Games was that full-body silhouettes, rather than round targets, continued to be used; however, scoring rings had been added so that now each shot was scored up to 10 rather than being strictly hit or miss.

Ties for medals were broken with a shoot-off. The shoot-off was three series of 5 shots, each with a 4-second time limit.

One change from 1948 to 1956 was that hits were no longer the primary measurement of success. As in 1960–1964, ranking was done by score, regardless of hits.

== Records ==
Prior to the competition, the existing world and Olympic records were as follows.

| World record | | | | |
| Olympic record | Pentti Linnosvuo (FIN) | 592 | Tokyo, Japan | 19 October 1964 |

Józef Zapędzki beat the Olympic record with 593 points.

== Schedule ==
| Date | Time | Round |
|---|---|---|
| Tuesday, 22 October 1968 | 8:30 | Course 1 |
| Wednesday, 23 October 1968 | 8:30 | Course 2 |

== Results ==
| Rank | Shooter | Nation | Score | Notes |
|---|---|---|---|---|
| 1st place, gold medalist(s) | Józef Zapędzki | Poland | 593 | OR |
| 2nd place, silver medalist(s) | Marcel Roșca | Romania | 591 | First shoot-off: 147 |
| 3rd place, bronze medalist(s) | Renart Suleymanov | Soviet Union | 591 | First shoot-off: 146; Second shoot-off: 148 |
| 4 | Christian Düring | East Germany | 591 | First shoot-off: 146; Second shoot-off: 146 |
| 5 | Erich Masurat | West Germany | 590 | |
| 6 | Gerhard Dommrich | East Germany | 589 | |
| 7 | Lubomír Nácovský | Czechoslovakia | 588 | |
| 8 | Giovanni Liverzani | Italy | 588 | |
| 9 | Hans Standl | West Germany | 587 | |
| 10 | Ladislav Falta | Czechoslovakia | 587 | |
| 11 | Pentti Linnosvuo | Finland | 587 | |
| 12 | Takeo Kamachi | Japan | 586 | |
| 13 | Waldemar Califf | Sweden | 586 | |
| 14 | Aladár Dobsa | Hungary | 586 | |
| 15 | Immo Huhtinen | Finland | 586 | |
| 16 | Wacław Hamerliński | Poland | 585 | |
| 17 | Bill McMillan | United States | 584 | |
| 18 | Ugo Amicosante | Italy | 584 | |
| 19 | Alexander Taransky | Australia | 583 | |
| 20 | Szilárd Kun | Hungary | 583 | |
| 21 | Virgil Atanasiu | Romania | 583 | |
| 22 | Alkiviadis Papageorgopoulos | Greece | 582 | |
| 23 | Makoto Shiraishi | Japan | 582 | |
| 24 | Tony Clark | Great Britain | 581 | |
| 25 | Jim McNally | United States | 580 | |
| 26 | Robert Hassell | Great Britain | 580 | |
| 27 | Anatoly Onishchuk | Soviet Union | 579 | |
| 28 | Dencho Denev | Bulgaria | 579 | |
| 29 | Fernando Samoya | Guatemala | 579 | |
| 30 | Hubert Garschall | Austria | 579 | |
| 31 | Jaime González | Spain | 579 | |
| 32 | Paterno Miranda | Philippines | 578 | |
| 33 | Víctor Castellanos | Guatemala | 578 | |
| 34 | Jules Sobrian | Canada | 576 | |
| 35 | Leonard Bull | Kenya | 576 | |
| 36 | Rangsit Yanothai | Thailand | 576 | |
| 37 | Taweesak Kasiwat | Thailand | 575 | |
| 38 | Oscar Cervo | Argentina | 575 | |
| 39 | Stig Berntsson | Sweden | 575 | |
| 40 | Kurt Klingler | Switzerland | 575 | |
| 41 | Víctor Tantalean | Peru | 572 | |
| 42 | Josef Ziltener | Switzerland | 572 | |
| 43 | Rafael Carpio | Mexico | 571 | |
| 44 | Nelson Torno | Argentina | 571 | |
| 45 | José Álava | Spain | 570 | |
| 46 | Loh Kok Heng | Singapore | 566 | |
| 47 | Tüdeviin Myagmarjav | Mongolia | 562 | |
| 48 | Enrique Torres | Mexico | 561 | |
| 49 | Tomás Vilanova | El Salvador | 561 | |
| 50 | Fernando Miranda | Puerto Rico | 558 | |
| 51 | Keith Elder | Canada | 554 | |
| 52 | Chou Yen-sheng | Taiwan | 549 | |
| 53 | Vũ Văn Danh | Vietnam | 548 | |
| 54 | Horacio Miranda | Philippines | 541 | |
| 55 | Helio Castro | El Salvador | 533 | |
| 56 | Young Kwok Wai | Hong Kong | 517 | |
