= Sport pistol =

Type of handgun

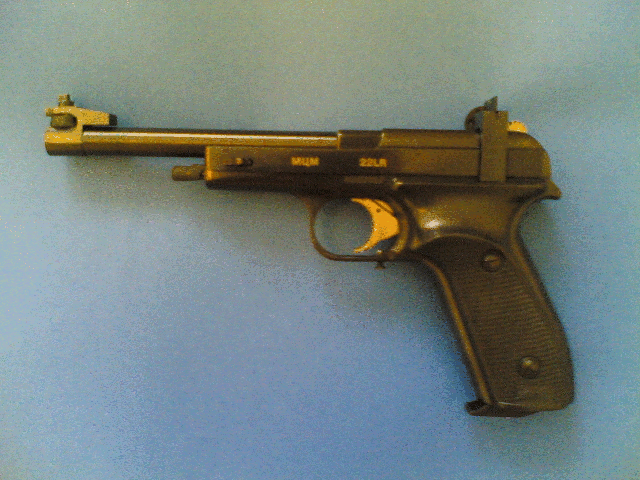
A Baikal MCM pistol

A sport pistol or standard pistol is a type of handgun used in several shooting sports, including the Olympic 25 metre pistol event and 25 metre standard pistol. Since 2005, the 25 metre rapid fire pistol rules also require the use of sport pistols, with a few extra requirements. Other sports to make use of this gun are women's 25 metre military rapid fire pistol, bullseye (in one of its three stages), and a variety of other national shooting sports.

By the International Shooting Sport Federation's rules, sport pistols must be in caliber .22 LR, with a minimum capacity of five rounds. Revolvers are allowed, but not at all as popular as in 25 metre center-fire pistol. Minimum trigger weight is 1,000 grams (2.2 lb), and maximum overall weight is 1,400 grams (3.1 lb). The gun may only have open sights, and there are restrictions to the design of the grip.

Common examples of sport pistols are the Benelli MP90S and Benelli MP95E, Walther GSP, the Baikal MCM, Hämmerli 208, Hämmerli 280 and Hämmerli SP20, the Pardini SP, as well as the High Standard .22 Pistol and the Smith & Wesson Model 41. Many of these have also spawned .32-caliber versions for use in the center-fire pistol event.
