= Standard pistol =

Standard pistol can be used:

- As a synonym for sport pistol about a .22-caliber handgun commonly used in shooting sports
- About the 25 metre standard pistol event, using such a pistol
- For the unrelated Standard Pistol class in PPC 1500 competitions
