= José Rosales =

José Rosales may refer to:

- José Luis Rosales (born 1943), Salvadoran sports shooter
- José Rosales (footballer) (born 1993), Guatemalan footballer
- José Rosales (politician) (1827–1891), President of El Salvador, Salvadoran politician, businessman, and military officer
