= Califf =

Califf is a surname. Notable people with the surname include:

- Danny Califf (born 1980), American soccer player
- Robert Califf (born 1951), American cardiologist
- Waldemar Califf (born 1936), Swedish sports shooter

== See also ==
- Anders Kaliff (born 1963), Swedish archaeologist
- Caliph (disambiguation)
