= Guillermo Martínez =

Guillermo Martínez is the name of:

- Guillermo Martínez (baseball) (born 1984), American baseball coach
- Guillermo Martínez Ayala (born 1995), Mexican football player
- Guillermo Martínez (javelin thrower) (born 1981), Cuban javelin thrower
- Guillermo Martínez (sport shooter) (born 1930), Colombian sport shooter
- Guillermo Martínez (volleyball) (born 1969), Argentine volleyball player
- Guillermo Martínez (writer) (born 1962), Argentine novelist and short story writer
- Guillermo Martínez Casañ (born 1955), Spanish politician
- Guillermo Ortiz Martínez (born 1948), Mexican economist and politician
- Guillermo Zúñiga Martínez (1942–2015), Mexican politician
