= Jean Richard =

Jean Richard may refer to:

Full name

- Jean Michel Claude Richard (1787–1868), French botanist
- Jean Richard (actor), French actor and comedian
- Jean Richard (historian) (1921–2021), French historian

Given name

- Jean-Richard Bloch (1884–1947), French critic, novelist and playwright
- Jean-Richard Germont (born 1945), French former sports shooter
- Jean-Richard Geurts (born 1957), also known under his pseudonym Janry, Belgian comics artist
- Jean-Richard Miguères (1940–1992), French ufologist

== See also ==
- Eugene Richards (disambiguation)
