= Eugene Richards (disambiguation) =

Eugene Richards (born 1944) is an American documentary photographer.

Eugene or Gene Richards may also refer to:

- Eugene Lamb Richards (1863–1927), American football player, lawyer, and politician
- Gene Richards (baseball) (born 1953), American baseball player
- Gene Richards (racing driver) (died 1982), American race car driver

== See also ==
- Eugène Richard (1843–1925), Swiss politician
- Jean Richard (disambiguation)
