= Keith Elder =

Canadian sports shooter

Personal information
- Born: 14 July 1940 (age 85) Brandon, Manitoba, Canada

Sport
- Sport: Sports shooting

Keith Elder (born 14 July 1940) is a Canadian former sports shooter. He competed in the 25 metre pistol event at the 1968 Summer Olympics.

Elder was inducted into the Manitoba Sports Hall of Fame in 2009.
