= Oleh Tkachov =

Ukrainian sport shooter (born 1962)

Personal information
- Native name: Олег Іванович Ткачов
- Full name: Oleh Ivanovych Tkachov
- Nationality: Ukraine
- Born: 5 May 1962 (age 64) Kyiv, Ukrainian SSR, Soviet Union
- Height: 1.74 m (5 ft 8 1/2 in)
- Weight: 72 kg (159 lb)

Sport
- Sport: Shooting
- Event: 25 m rapid fire pistol (RFP)
- Club: Kyiv Army Sports Club
- Coached by: Oleksandr Savchuk

Oleh Ivanovych Tkachov (Ukrainian: Олег Іванович Ткачов; born 5 May 1962) is a Ukrainian sport shooter. He claimed the gold medal in rapid fire pistol shooting at the 2003 ISSF World Cup series in Fort Benning, Georgia, United States, and later finished fourth at the 2004 Summer Olympics in Athens, narrowly missing out his chance to climb up the medal podium. Serving as a member of the Kyiv Armed Forces, Tkachov trained throughout his sporting career for the army's shooting club under his personal coach Oleksandr Savchuk.

Tkachov qualified for the Ukrainian squad, as the oldest male athlete (aged 42), in the men's 25 m rapid fire pistol at the 2004 Summer Olympics in Athens. Earlier in the process, he eclipsed a minimum score of 587 points to grab his own slot for the Games and earn a gold medal victory at the initial stop of the 2003 ISSF World Cup series in Fort Benning, Georgia, United States. Having achieved a score of 587 to obtain the fifth spot from the prelims, Tkachov solidly scored 101.7 points to claim a fourth-place finish in the final at 688.7, but narrowly missed out his chance for an Olympic medal by nearly four points behind the Russians Sergei Polyakov and Sergei Alifirenko.
