= Chen Yongqiang (sport shooter) =

Chinese sport shooter (born 1974)

Chen Yongqiang (simplified Chinese: 陈永强; traditional Chinese: 陳永強; pinyin: Chén Yǒngqiáng; born October 3, 1974, in Shanghai) is a male Chinese sports shooter. He competed in the 2004 Summer Olympics.

In 2004, he finished sixth in the men's 25 metre rapid fire pistol competition.
