= Ghenadie Lisoconi =

Moldovan sports shooter

Personal information
- Nationality: Moldova
- Born: 28 August 1964 (age 61)
- Height: 1.74 m (5 ft 8 1/2 in)
- Weight: 74 kg (163 lb)

Sport
- Sport: Shooting
- Event: 25 m rapid fire pistol (RFP)

Ghenadie Lisoconi (born August 28, 1964) is a Moldovan sport shooter. He won a silver medal in rapid fire pistol at the 1997 ISSF World Cup series in Seoul, South Korea, accumulating a score of 684.9 points.

Lisoconi made his official debut for the 1996 Summer Olympics in Atlanta, Georgia, where he competed in the men's 25 m rapid fire pistol. He finished only in sixth place by one hundredth of a point (0.01) behind China's Meng Gang, with a total score of 687.0 targets (586 in the preliminary rounds and 101.0 in the final).

Twelve years after competing in his last Olympics, Lisoconi qualified for his second Moldovan team, as a 44-year-old, at the 2008 Summer Olympics in Beijing. Lisoconi hit a total of 567 targets (282 on the first stage and 285 on the second) in the preliminary rounds of the men's 25 m rapid fire pistol, finishing only in twelfth place by one point behind Brazil's Júlio Almeida.
