= Robert McAuliffe =

American sports shooter

Personal information
- Born: 10 March 1939 Trinidad and Tobago
- Died: 24 May 2005 (aged 66) Puerto Rico

Sport
- Sport: Sports shooting

Robert N. McAuliffe (10 March 1939 – 24 May 2005) was a sports shooter from the United States Virgin Islands. He competed in the 25 metre pistol event at the 1972 Summer Olympics in Munich.

== See also ==
- Shooting at the 1972 Summer Olympics – Mixed 25 metre rapid fire pistol (section: Results)
