= Kurt Rey (sport shooter) =

Swiss sports shooter

Personal information
- Born: 27 July 1937 (age 88)

Sport
- Sport: Sports shooting

Kurt Rey (born 27 July 1937) is a Swiss former sports shooter. He competed in the 25 metre pistol event at the 1972 Summer Olympics.
