= Damián Cerdá =

Spanish sport shooter

Personal information
- Born: 26 April 1940
- Died: October 2024 (aged 84)

Sport
- Sport: Sports shooting

Damián Cerdá (26 April 1940 – October 2024) was a Spanish sports shooter. He competed in the 25 metre pistol event at the 1972 Summer Olympics.
