= Fernando Samoya =

Guatemalan sports shooter

Personal information
- Born: 5 October 1940 (age 85) Guatemala City, Guatemala

Sport
- Sport: Sports shooting

Fernando Samoya (born 5 October 1940) is a Guatemalan former sports shooter. He competed in the 25 metre pistol event at the 1968 Summer Olympics.
