= Simon González =

Puerto Rican sports shooter

Personal information
- Full name: Simon González Amador
- Born: 21 September 1936 Isabela, Puerto Rico
- Died: 29 March 2025 (aged 88) Isabela, Puerto Rico

Sport
- Sport: Sports shooting

Simon González Amador (21 September 1936 – 29 March 2025) was a Puerto Rican sports shooter. He competed in the 25 metre pistol event at the 1972 Summer Olympics.

González died on 29 March 2025 in Isabela, Puerto Rico, at the age of 88.
