= Vũ Văn Danh =

Vietnamese sports shooter

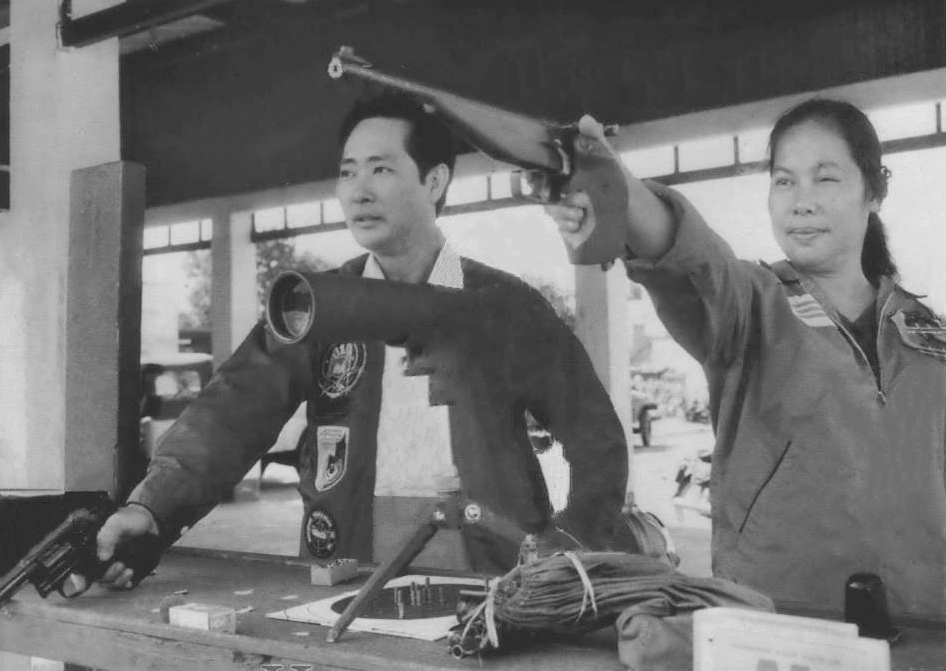
- Danh and Thi at the 1972 Olympics

Personal information
- Born: 17 April 1926 Hanoi, French Indochina
- Height: 169 cm (5 ft 7 in)
- Weight: 64 kg (141 lb)

Sport
- Sport: Sports shooting

Vũ Văn Danh (born 17 April 1926) is a Vietnamese former sports shooter. He competed in the 25 metre pistol event at the 1968 Summer Olympics and placed 53rd. He was a police colonel and was married to a fellow Olympics shooter Hương Hoàng Thi.
