= Gerhard Dommrich =

German sports shooter

Personal information
- Born: 17 July 1932 Nordhausen, Germany
- Died: 5 May 2014 (aged 81) Chemnitz, Germany

Sport
- Sport: Sports shooting

Gerhard Dommrich (17 July 1932 – 5 May 2014) was a German sports shooter. He competed in the 25 metre pistol event at the 1968 Summer Olympics for East Germany.
