= Anders Lau =

Danish sports shooter (born 1953)

Personal information
- Nationality: Danish
- Born: 6 June 1953 (age 72); Aabenraa, Denmark

Sport
- Sport: Sports shooting

Anders Lau (born 6 June 1953) is a Danish sports shooter. He competed in the men's 25 metre rapid fire pistol event at the 1996 Summer Olympics.
