= Morini (manufacturer) =

Manufacturer of target pistols

Morini Competition Arm S.A
- Type: Private
- Industry: firearms
- Founded: 1973
- Founder: Cesare Morini
- Headquarters: Bedano, Ticino, Switzerland
- Area served: Worldwide
- Products: ISSF Target Pistols and accessories
- Website: http://www.morini.ch
- Footnotes; Pistols have electronic trigger mechanisms

Morini Competition Arm S.A. is a Swiss manufacturer of target pistols aimed at ISSF shooting events as governed by the International Shooting Sport Federation (ISSF, formerly UIT) and competed in at the Olympics.

The company was formed in 1973 in Italy as a maker of anatomical grips for target pistols and still supply these grips to many other companies in addition to producing competition arms themselves.

During the following years, complying with laws and regulations governing guns become more and more complicated in Italy, and in 1985 the company decided to move to Lamone, Canton Ticino, the Italian speaking region of Switzerland.

In 1990 the company moved to Bedano, its current headquarters, which is another small village of the Italian speaking region of Switzerland.

Currently their CM 162 EI air pistol and CM 84E free pistol are amongst the most popular choices, for 10 m Air Pistol and 50 m Pistol respectively, amongst top international competitors. These pistols have an electronic trigger mechanism.

== Models ==
All model are prefixed CM for Cesare Morini, the founder of the company.

=== CM 84E ===
This pistol was designed .22 Long Rifle calibre used in 50 m Pistol event that used to be called Free Pistol and these pistols are still referred to as free pistols. It features an electronic trigger. It was used to win the gold (by Mikhail Nestruev) at the 2004 Summer Olympics in Athens, Greece, (by Jin Jong-oh at the 2008 Summer Olympics in Beijing, China, and at the 2012 Summer Olympics in London, United Kingdom. It was also used to win the 1994 World Championship (by Wang Yifu) in Milan, Italy, both the 2002 and 2006 World Championships (by Tan Zongliang in Lahti, Finland and Zagreb, Croatia respectively, and then the 2010 World Championship (by Tomoyuki Matsuda) in Munich, Germany. Now (by Jin Jong-oh) of Korea in the 2016 Rio Olympics. The pistol also racked up numerous World Cup victories since 1994.

=== CM 162 ===
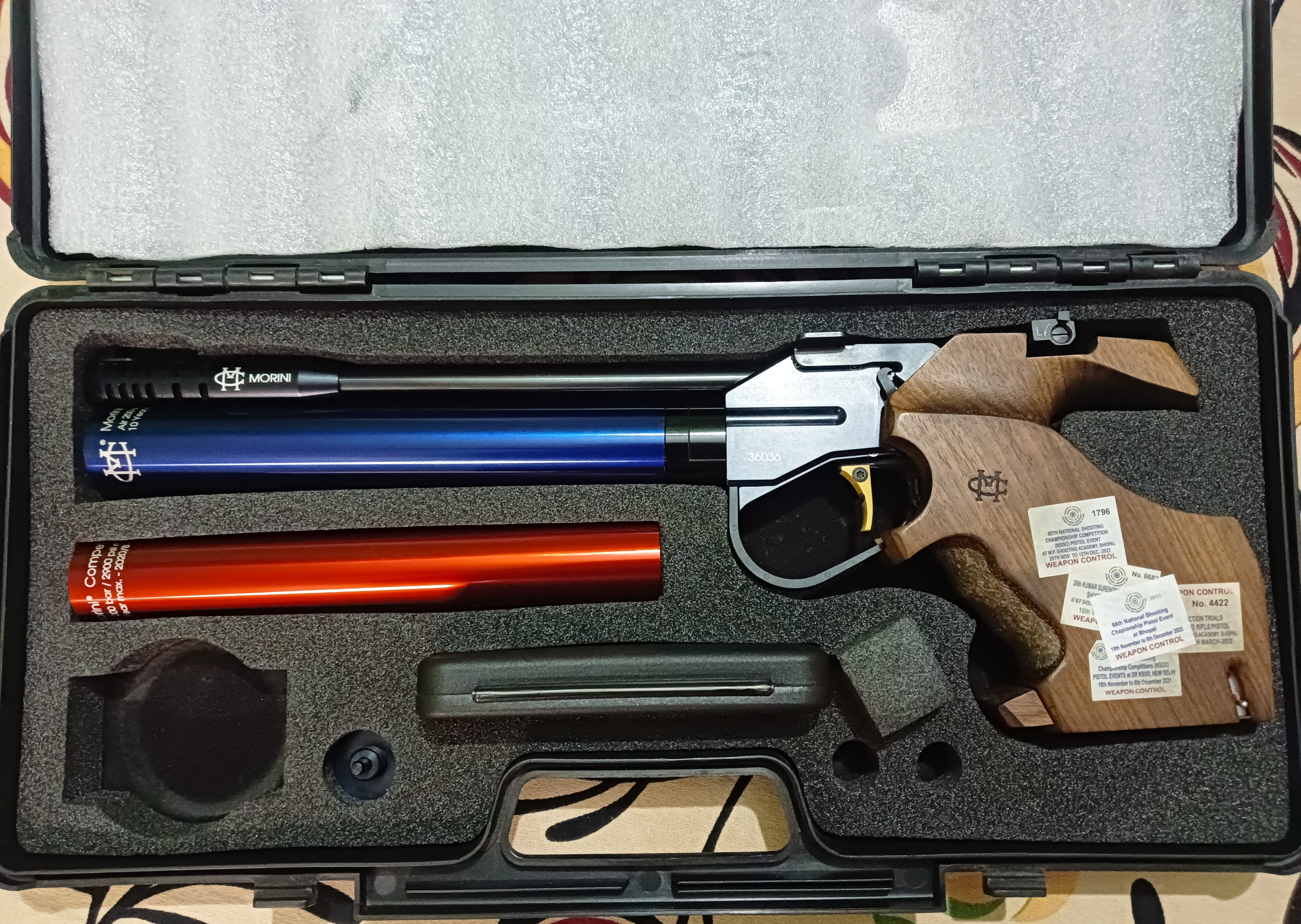
Morini 162 MI

This is 4.5 mm (.177 in) calibre pre-charged pneumatic (PCP) air pistol used in 10 m Air Pistol event. It was the first pre-charged pistol to use compressed air rather than CO_{2} as a propellant. The air cylinder is positioned directly under the barrel and is normally filled with a SCUBA tank or a high-pressure hand pump to a pressure of approximately 200 bar (2900 psi). It is available in several variants, most notable one with an electronic trigger. The CM 162 EI version of this pistol is being used by many famous leading shooters worldwide, including Malaika Goel (The Commonwealth Games 2014 10 m Air Pistol event Silver Medallist), and many others. This pistol is the preference of many leading shooting coaches because of its tolerance for small mistakes by entry-level shooters.

Variants:

- CM 162 E, Electronic trigger, fixed air cylinder
- CM 162 M, Mechanical trigger, fixed air cylinder
- CM 162 EI (EA in Germany), Electronic trigger, removable air cylinder
- CM 162 MI, Mechanical trigger, removable air cylinder
- CM 162 EI Short (EA in Germany), Shortened, electronic trigger
- CM 162 MI Short, Shortened, mechanical trigger

=== CM 22M ===
This .22 Long Rifle calibre standard pistol is used in 25 m Standard Pistol and 25 m Pistol. It is also available in a lighter version using more aluminium parts called the CM 22M ALU.

=== CM 32M ===
This is a .32 S&W in calibre sport pistol used in the 25 m Center-Fire Pistol event.

== See also ==
- International Shooting Sport Federation (ISSF)
- ISSF shooting events
