= Aladár Dobsa =

Hungarian sports shooter

Personal information
- Born: 28 December 1931 Komló, Hungary
- Died: 1 October 2016 (aged 84)

Sport
- Sport: Sports shooting

Aladár Dobsa (28 December 1931 – 1 October 2016) was a Hungarian sports shooter. He competed in the 25 metre pistol event at the 1968 Summer Olympics.
