= Oleg Khvatsovas =

Belarusian sport shooter

Oleg Khvatsovas (born September 10, 1967 in Kiev) is a sport shooter who competed for Belarus. He competed at the 2000 Summer Olympics in the men's 25 metre rapid fire pistol event, in which he placed sixth.
