= Sabin Chaushev =

Bulgarian sports shooter (born 1971)

Personal information
- Nationality: Bulgarian
- Born: 8 June 1971 (age 53); Yambol, Bulgaria

Sport
- Sport: Sports shooting

Sabin Chaushev (born 8 June 1971) is a Bulgarian sports shooter. He competed in the men's 25 metre rapid fire pistol event at the 1996 Summer Olympics.
