= Anatoly Onishchuk =

Soviet sports shooter

Personal information
- Born: 29 August 1946 (age 79) Smolensk, Soviet Union

Sport
- Sport: Sports shooting

Anatoly Onishchuk (Russian: Анатолий Онищук; born 29 August 1946) is a Soviet former sports shooter. He competed in the 25 metre pistol event at the 1968 Summer Olympics.
