= Hương Hoàng Thi =

Vietnamese sports shooter

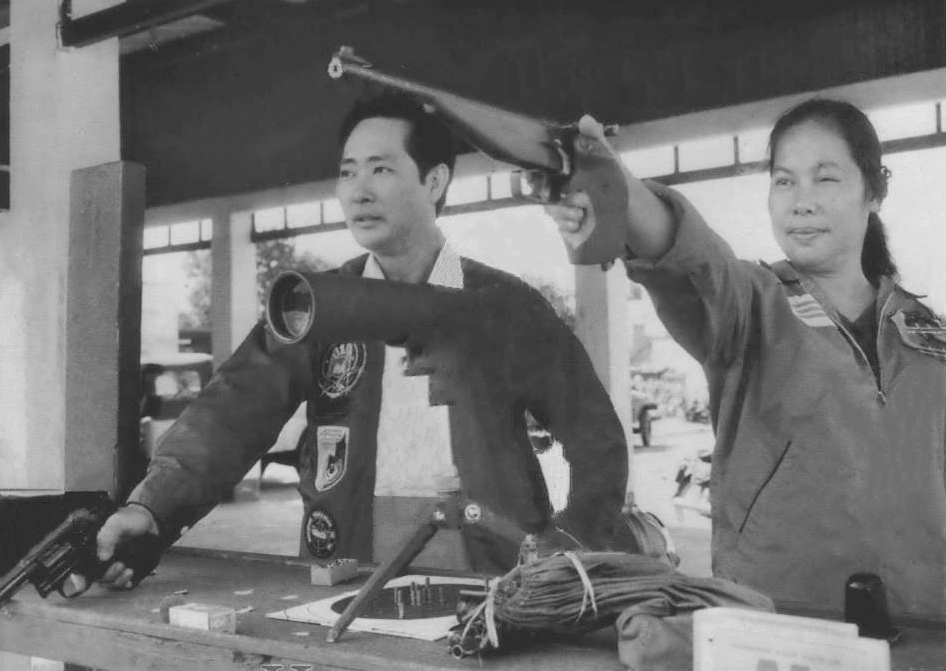
- Danh and Thi at the 1972 Olympics

Personal information
- Full name: Hương Hoàng Thi
- Born: c.1934

Sport
- Sport: Sports shooting

Hương Hoàng Thi (born c.1934) is a Vietnamese former sports shooter. She competed in the 50 metre pistol event at the 1972 Summer Olympics and placed 56th. She was married to a fellow Olympics shooter Vũ Văn Danh.
