= Urs Tobler =

Swiss sports shooter

Personal information
- Nationality: Swiss
- Born: 4 March 1971 (age 54)

Sport
- Sport: Sports shooting

Urs Tobler (born 4 March 1971) is a Swiss sports shooter. He competed in the men's 25 metre rapid fire pistol event at the 1996 Summer Olympics.
