= Helmut Seeger =

German sports shooter (1932–2023)

Personal information
- Born: 7 October 1932 Offenbach am Main, Germany
- Died: 19 October 2023 (aged 91)

Sport
- Sport: Sports shooting

Helmut Seeger (7 October 1932 – 19 October 2023) was a German sports shooter. He competed in the 25 metre pistol event at the 1972 Summer Olympics for West Germany. Seeger died on 19 October 2023, at the age of 91.
