= Josef Ziltener =

Swiss sports shooter

Personal information
- Born: 1 September 1931 Lucerne, Switzerland

Sport
- Sport: Sports shooting

Josef Ziltener (born 1 September 1931) is a Swiss former sports shooter. He competed in the 25 metre pistol event at the 1968 Summer Olympics.
