= Víctor Tantalean =

Peruvian sports shooter

Personal information
- Born: 27 November 1933 (age 92) San Vicente, Peru

Sport
- Sport: Sports shooting

Víctor Tantalean (born 27 November 1933) is a Peruvian former sports shooter. He competed in the 25 metre pistol event at the 1968 Summer Olympics.
