= José Álava =

Spanish sports shooter

Personal information
- Born: 26 June 1940 (age 86) Vitoria, Spain

Sport
- Sport: Sports shooting

José Álava (born 26 June 1940) is a Spanish former sports shooter. He competed in the 25 metre pistol event at the 1968 Summer Olympics.
