= Hans Standl =

German sports shooter (1926–2021)

Personal information
- Born: 11 February 1926 Füssen, Germany
- Died: 23 March 2021 (aged 95) Germany

Sport
- Sport: Sports shooting

Hans Standl (11 February 1926 – 23 March 2021) was a German sports shooter. He competed in the 25 metre pistol event at the 1968 Summer Olympics for West Germany. Standl died in March 2021 at the age of 95.
