= Dobrčice =

- Municipality
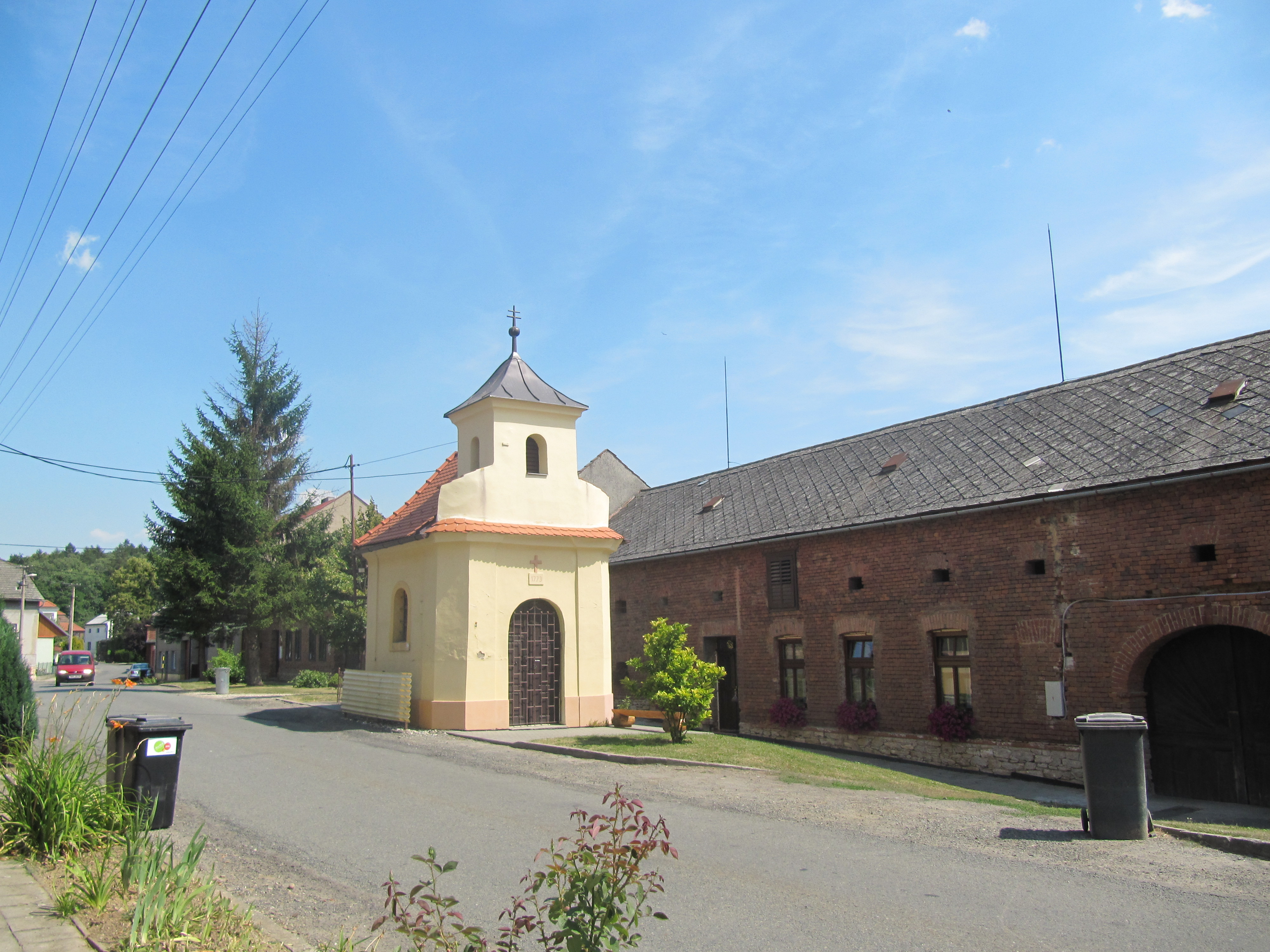
- Chapel of the Virgin Mary

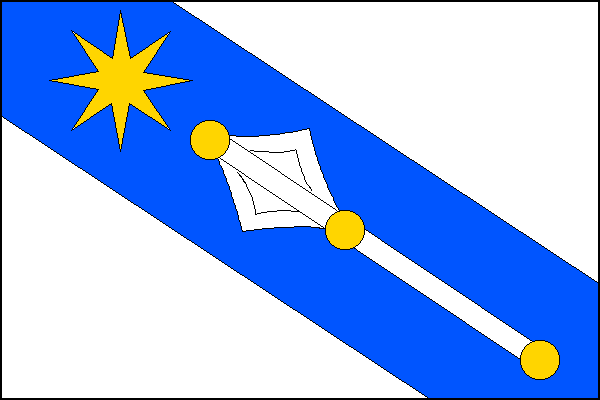
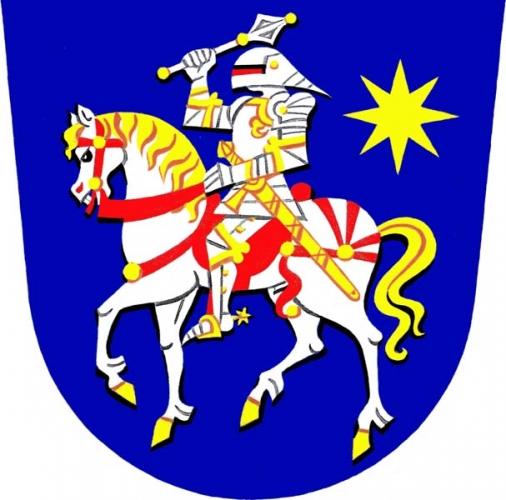
- Flag Coat of arms

- Location in the Czech Republic
- Coordinates: 49°24′7″N 17°28′50″E
- Country: Czech Republic
- Region: Olomouc
- District: Přerov
- First mentioned: 1356

Area
  - Total: 2.20 km^{2} (0.85 sq mi)
- Elevation: 243 m (797 ft)

Population (2026-01-01)
  - Total: 233
  - Density: 106/km^{2} (274/sq mi)
- Time zone: UTC+1 (CET)
  - Summer (DST): UTC+2 (CEST)
- Postal code: 750 02
- Website: www.dobrcice.cz

Dobrčice is a municipality and village in Přerov District in the Olomouc Region of the Czech Republic. It has about 200 inhabitants.

Dobrčice lies approximately 7 kilometres (4 mi) south of Přerov, 27 km (17 mi) south-east of Olomouc, and 233 km (145 mi) east of Prague.

== Demographics ==
Historical population
Year	Pop.	±%
1869	293	—
1880	282	−3.8%
1890	273	−3.2%
1900	286	+4.8%
1910	300	+4.9%
1921	343	+14.3%
1930	371	+8.2%
1950	279	−24.8%
1961	288	+3.2%
1970	241	−16.3%
1980	208	−13.7%
1991	188	−9.6%
2001	199	+5.9%
2011	223	+12.1%
2021	214	−4.0%
Source: Censuses

== Notable people ==
- Vladimír Hurt (born 1948), sport shooter
