= Chou Yen-sheng =

Taiwanese sports shooter

Personal information
- Full name: 周 寅生, Pinyin: Zhōu Yín-shēng
- Born: 28 February 1931 Funing, Republic of China

Sport
- Sport: Sports shooting

Chou Yen-sheng (born 28 February 1931) is a Taiwanese former sports shooter. He competed in the 25 metre pistol event at the 1968 Summer Olympics.
