= Young Kwok Wai =

Hong Kong sports shooter

Personal information
- Born: 3 September 1929 China

Sport
- Sport: Sports shooting

Young Kwok Wai (born 3 September 1929) is a Hong Kong former sports shooter. He competed in the 25 metre pistol event at the 1968 Summer Olympics. He also competed at the 1966 and 1974 Asian Games.
