= Marcel Roșca =

Romanian pistol shooter

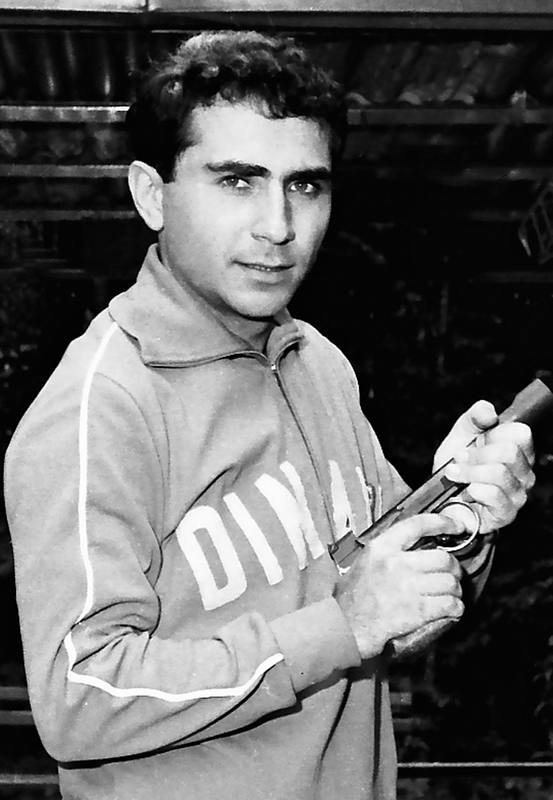

Personal information
- Born: 18 October 1943 (age 82) Bucharest, Romania
- Height: 181 cm (5 ft 11 in)
- Weight: 78 kg (172 lb)

Sport
- Sport: Sports shooting
- Event: 25 rapid-fire pistol
Medal record
Representing Romania
Olympic Games
Silver medal – second place	1968 Mexico City	Individual
World Championships
Silver medal – second place	1966 Wiesbaden	Team
Silver medal – second place	1970 Phoenix	Team
Bronze medal – third place	1974 Bern-Thun	Team

Marcel Roșca (Romanian pronunciation: [marˈtʃel ˈroʃka]; born 18 October 1943) is a retired Romanian pistol shooter. He competed in the individual 25 m rapid-fire event at the 1964 (Tokyo) and 1968 (Mexico) Olympics and won a silver medal in 1968, placing sixth at the former. He also won three team medals at the World Championships in 1966, 1970, and 1974. In 1969 he won the silver medal at the European Championships in Plzen, Czechoslovakia, at 25m Rapid Fire Pistol Men.

== Biography ==
Roșca was born in a family of singers and always wanted to become one. In 1968, he graduated from the Theatrical Arts Academy, but instead of pursuing a theatrical career, he became chief officer of the Traffic Division of the Bucharest Police.

In 1970, he was a winner of the X Factor TV show "Star without name". After that he sang as a bass with the Romanian National Opera before defecting to West Germany in 1984.
