= Peter Laurence (sport shooter) =

Kenyan sports shooter (born 1931)

Personal information
- Born: 11 December 1931

Sport
- Sport: Sports shooting

Peter Laurence (born 11 December 1931) is a Kenyan former sports shooter. He competed in the 25 metre pistol event at the 1972 Summer Olympics.
