= Wacław Hamerliński =

Polish sports shooter

Personal information
- Born: 26 August 1936 (age 89) Jeziora Wielkie, Poland

Sport
- Sport: Sports shooting

Wacław Hamerliński (born 26 August 1936) is a Polish former sports shooter. He competed in the 25 metre pistol event at the 1968 Summer Olympics.
