= Erich Masurat =

German sports shooter

Personal information
- Born: 11 August 1927 Königsberg, East Prussia, Weimar Germany (Kaliningrad, Russia)
- Died: 25 October 2012 (aged 85)

Sport
- Sport: Sports shooting

Erich Masurat (11 August 1927 – 25 October 2012) was a German sports shooter. He competed in the 25 metre pistol event at the 1968 Summer Olympics for West Germany.
