= Thor-Øistein Endsjø =

Norwegian Olympic sports shooter (1936–2024)

Personal information
- Born: 1 May 1936 Akershus, Norway
- Died: 9 August 2024 (aged 88)

Sport
- Sport: Sports shooting

Thor-Øistein Endsjø (1 May 1936 – 9 August 2024) was a Norwegian sports shooter and physician.

Endsjø competed in the 25 metre pistol event at the 1972 Summer Olympics. As a physician he worked at private clinics in Oslo and Bærum, including Humana which he co-established in Sandvika. He was the team physician for Norway in five Olympic Games and has been associated with the Norwegian Athletics Association and several other sports federations. He resided at Blommenholm, and died on 9 August 2024, at the age of 88.
