= Kurt Klingler =

Swiss sports shooter (1928–2023)

Personal information
- Born: 9 September 1928 Bülach, Switzerland
- Died: 13 November 2023 (aged 95) Glattfelden, Switzerland

Sport
- Sport: Sports shooting

Kurt Klingler (9 September 1928 – 13 November 2023) was a Swiss sports shooter. He competed in the 25 metre pistol event at the 1968 Summer Olympics. Klingler died in Glattfelden on 13 November 2023, at the age of 95.
