= Albert Udachin =

Soviet sports shooter

Personal information
- Born: 24 July 1941 (age 84)

Sport
- Sport: Sports shooting

Albert Udachin (born 24 July 1941) is a Soviet former sports shooter. He competed in the 50 metre pistol event at the 1964 Summer Olympics.
