= Jean-Richard Germont =

French sports shooter

Personal information
- Born: 2 April 1945 (age 81)

Sport
- Sport: Sports shooting

Jean-Richard Germont (born 2 April 1945) is a French former sports shooter. He competed in the 25 metre pistol event at the 1972 Summer Olympics.
