= Waldemar Califf =

Swedish sports shooter

Personal information
- Born: 9 November 1936 (age 89) Skövde, Sweden

Sport
- Sport: Sports shooting

Waldemar Califf (born 9 November 1936) is a Swedish former sports shooter. He competed in the 25 metre pistol event at the 1968 Summer Olympics.
