= Pål Hembre =

Norwegian sports shooter (born 1963)

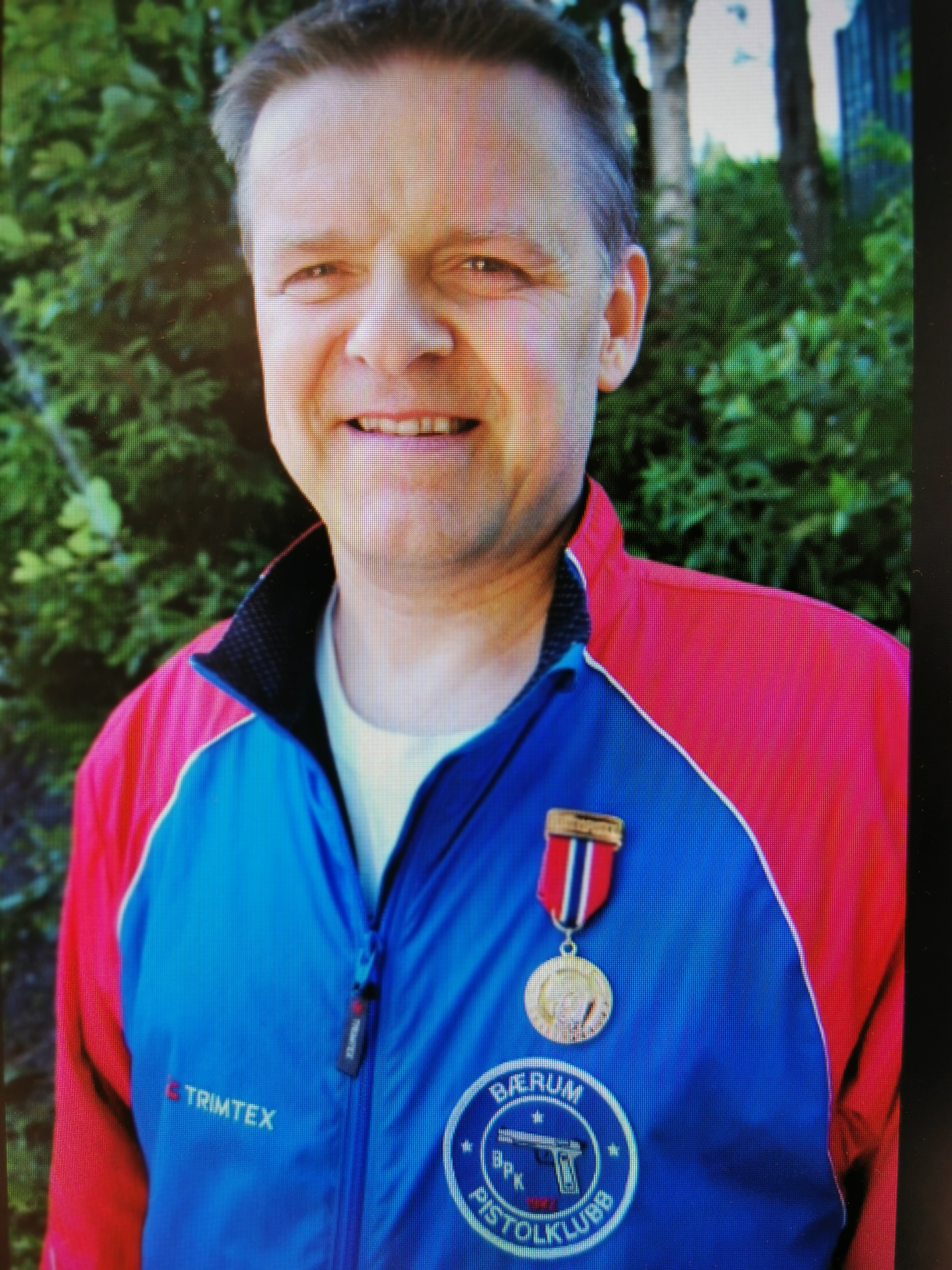
Pål Hembre in 2022

Pål Hembre (born 20 April 1963) is a Norwegian Olympic sport shooter and World Champion.

== Biography ==
Hembre became World Champion in 1994, in 25 metre center-fire pistol, and is twice military World Champion, from 1991 and 1992. He competed at the 1996 Summer Olympics in Atlanta.
