= José Luis Rosales =

Salvadoran sports shooter

Personal information
- Born: 1 March 1943 (age 83)

Sport
- Sport: Sports shooting

José Luis Rosales (born 1 March 1943) is a Salvadoran former sports shooter. He competed in the 25 metre pistol event at the 1972 Summer Olympics.
