= Guillermo Martínez (sport shooter) =

Colombian sports shooter

Personal information
- Born: 5 February 1930

Sport
- Sport: Shooting

Guillermo Martínez (born 5 February 1930) is a Colombian former sports shooter. He competed in the 25 metre pistol event at the 1972 Summer Olympics.
