= Rafael Carpio =

Mexican sports shooter

Personal information
- Born: 26 October 1937 (age 88) Mexico City, Mexico

Sport
- Sport: Sports shooting

Rafael Carpio (born 26 October 1937) is a Mexican former sports shooter. He competed in the 25 metre pistol event at the 1968 Summer Olympics.
