= Michel Ansermet =

Swiss sport shooter

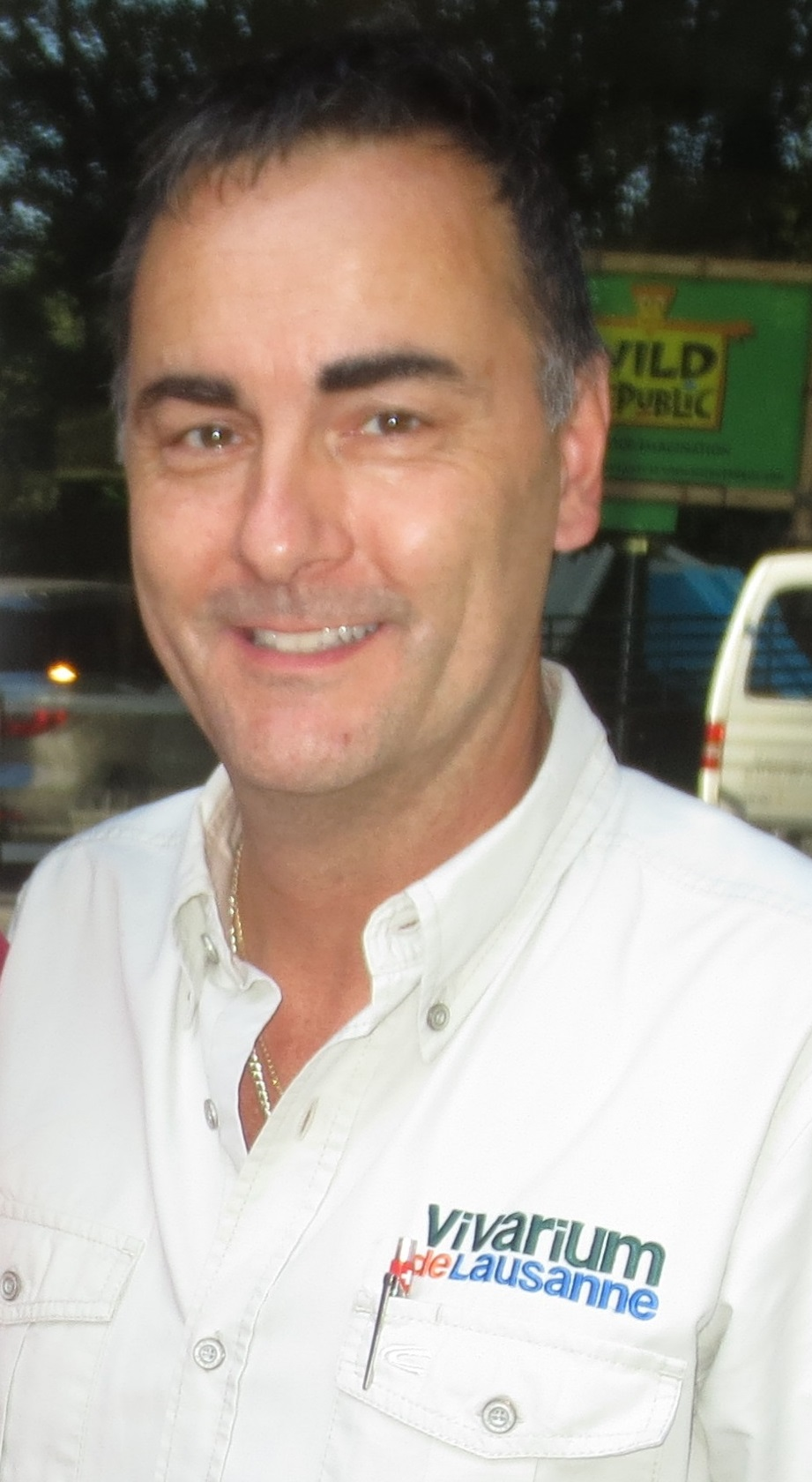

Personal information
- Born: 20 February 1965 (age 61)
Medal record
Men's shooting
Representing Switzerland
Olympic Games
Silver medal – second place	2000 Sydney	25 m rapid fire pistol

Michel Ansermet (born 20 February 1965) is a Swiss pistol shooter who has appeared in two Olympic Games. Ansermet made his Olympic debut in 1996. He won his first medal in 2000 winning silver in the 25 metre rapid fire pistol. He was also active as a cyclist and as such he participated in the prestigious time trial Grand Prix des Nations in 1986.

He is also a herpetologist and director of the Vivarium de Lausanne.
