= Benelli MP 90S =

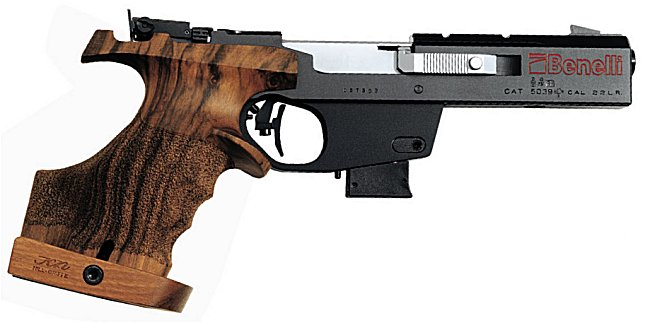
- Benelli MP 90S
- Type: Target pistol
- Place of origin: Italy

Production history
- Manufacturer: Benelli Armi SpA

Specifications
- Mass: 1,100 g (39 oz)
- Barrel length: 110 mm (4.3 in)
- Width: 50 mm (2.0 in)
- Height: 132 mm (5.2 in)
- Cartridge: .22 LR, .32 S&W Long
- Action: Blowback, semi-automatic
- Feed system: .22 LR version: 6-round detachable box magazine, .32 S&W Long version: 5-round detachable box magazine
- Sights: fixed front sight, rear sight with lateral and vertical adjustment

The Benelli MP 90S is a precision target shooting pistol designed for the 25 metre pistol and 25 metre rapid fire pistol ISSF shooting events. It is manufactured by Benelli Armi SpA of Italy. Available calibers are .22 LR and .32 S&W Long Wadcutter.

The Finnish military shooting team uses the MP90S.

== Features ==
Like all pistols designed for the 25 metre pistol and 25 metre rapid fire pistol events, it has fully adjustable sights, trigger and anatomically shaped grip. It employs a semi-automatic fixed barrel operation using the inertial, blow-back system. The feed is through sequential loading with a 5 or 6-round magazine depending upon the caliber.

The trigger action is single action and completely adjustable. The sights are of a square-section type, with fixed front sight and a rear sight with lateral and vertical adjustment. The sight radius is 218 mm (from rear to front sight).

The MP90S is constructed from tough materials, resistant to wear. The barrel is made of chrome-nickel alloy steel. The breech and bolt are constructed from chrome-molybdenum steel. The trigger guard is made of a special alloy of anodised ergal 55 aluminium, while the trigger mechanism is made from molybdenum chrome-nickel, heat treated and chromed.

== Performance ==
The following table shows the major results achieved by shooters using the Benelli MP90S:

Competition	Result	Location	Date	Competitor
ISSF World Cup	Silver medal	Milan (ITA)	October 2003	Diana Iorgova
ISSF World Cup	Gold medal	Munich (GER)	June 2005	Jasna Šekarić
European Championship	Gold medal	Serbia - Belgrade	2005	Jasna Šekarić
European Championship	Bronze medal	Serbia - Belgrade	2005	Nicola Maffei
ISSF World Cup	Gold medal	Resende (BRA)	May 2006	Jasna Šekarić
Italian Championship	Gold medal	Milan (ITA)	September 2006	Nicola Maffei
Italian Championship	Gold medal	Milan (ITA)	September 2007	Nicola Maffei
Italian Championship	Silver medal	Milan (ITA)	September 2007	Alberto Cardinali
ISSF World Cup	Gold medal	Beijing (CHN)	April 2008	Jasna Šekarić
European Championship Juniores	Bronze medal	Plzeň (CZE)	July 2008	Jesse Peltomäki
Italian Championship	Gold medal	Bologna (ITA)	September 2008	Nicola Maffei
Italian Championship	Gold medal	Bologna (ITA)	September 2008	Alberto Cardinali
World Military Shooting Championship	Silver medal	Norway - Elverum	June 2025	Sampo Voutilainen
European Championship	Bronze medal	France - Châteauroux	July 2025	Sampo Voutilainen

== See also ==
- Benelli MP 95E
