= Viktor Torshin =

Russian sport shooter

Personal information
- Born: 28 March 1948 Berlin, Germany
- Died: 20 August 1993 (aged 45)

Sport
- Sport: Sports shooting
Medal record
Men's shooting
Representing Soviet Union
Olympic Games
Bronze medal – third place	1972 Munich	rapid fire pistol

Viktor Torshin (21 March 1948 – 20 August 1993) was a Russian sport shooter who competed in the 1972 Summer Olympics and in the 1976 Summer Olympics. He won a bronze medal at the 1972 Summer Olympics.
