= Alban Pierson =

French sport shooter

Personal information
- Full name: Alban Lucien Pierson
- Nationality: French
- Born: 27 December 1972 (age 53)

Sport
- Country: France
- Sport: Shooting
- Event: Air pistol
Medal record
World Championships
Gold medal – first place	2018 Changwon	25 m team standard pistol
Silver medal – second place	2018 Changwon	25 m team center fire pistol

Alban Lucien Pierson (born 27 December 1972) is a French sport shooter.

He participated at the 2018 ISSF World Shooting Championships, winning a medal.
