= Jouni Vainio =

Finnish sports shooter (born 1960)

Jouni Antero Vainio (born 13 October 1960 in Mäntsälä) is a Finnish former sport shooter who competed in the 1988 Summer Olympics.
