= Paavo Palokangas =

Finnish sports shooter

Personal information
- Nationality: Finnish
- Born: 11 October 1943 (age 81); Helsinki, Finland

Sport
- Sport: Sports shooting

Paavo Palokangas (born 11 October 1943) is a Finnish sports shooter. He competed at the 1980 Summer Olympics and the 1984 Summer Olympics.
