= Myroslav Ihnatyuk =

Ukrainian sport shooter

Myroslav Ihnatyuk (born February 2, 1957) is a Ukrainian sport shooter. He competed at the Summer Olympics in 1992 and 1996. In 1992, he placed sixth in the men's 25 metre rapid fire pistol event, and in 1996, he placed ninth in the men's 25 metre rapid fire pistol event.
