= Christian Düring =

German sports shooter

Personal information
- Born: 22 July 1939 (age 86) Eberswalde, Germany

Sport
- Sport: Sports shooting

Christian Düring (born 22 July 1939) is a German former sports shooter. He competed at the 1968 Summer Olympics and the 1972 Summer Olympics for East Germany.
