= Benelli MP 95E =

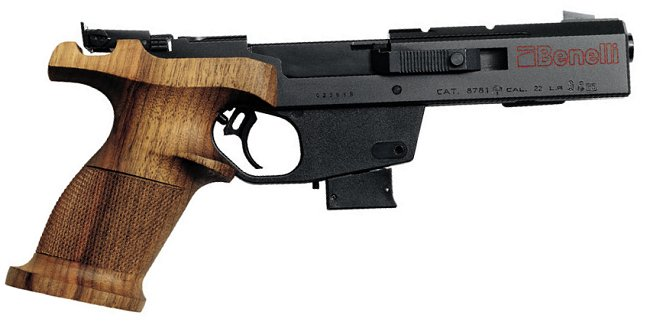
- Benelli MP 95E World Cup 22 cal Long Rifle
- Type: Target pistol
- Place of origin: Italy

Production history
- Manufacturer: Benelli Armi SpA
- Variants: Benelli MP 95E 32 gauge Wad Cutter

Specifications
- Mass: 1100 gr
- Cartridge: .22 LR, .32 S&W Long
- Action: Blowback, semi-automatic
- Feed system: .22 LR version: 6-round detachable box magazine, .32 S&W Long version: 5-round detachable box magazine
- Sights: fixed front sight, rear sight with lateral and vertical adjustment

The Benelli MP 95E or Benelli MP95 Atlanta is a precision target shooting pistol designed for the 25 metre pistol and 25 metre rapid fire pistol ISSF shooting events. It is manufactured by Benelli Armi SpA of Italy. Available calibers are .22 LR and .32 S&W Long Wadcutter.

== Features ==
Like all pistols designed for the 25 metre pistol and 25 metre rapid fire pistol events, it has fully adjustable sights, trigger and anatomically shaped grip.

It lacks the palm shelf of the older MP90, but one can be added as an option. The top of the pistol features numerous rails for the mounting of a scope or electronic sight.

== See also ==
- Benelli MP 90S
