= Iulian Raicea =

Romanian sports shooter

Olympic medal record

Men's shooting

Representing Romania
Bronze medal – third place	2000 Sydney	rapid fire pistol

Iulian Raicea (born 4 March 1973) is a Romanian sport shooter who competed in the 1992 Summer Olympics, in the 1996 Summer Olympics, in the 2000 Summer Olympics, in the 2004 Summer Olympics, and in the 2008 Summer Olympics.
