= Boris Artaud =

French sport shooter

Personal information
- Born: 26 May 1990 (age 36) Marseille, France
- Height: 1.78 m (5 ft 10 in)
- Weight: 74 kg (163 lb)

Sport
- Country: France
- Sport: Shooting
- Event: Air pistol
- Club: CTPN Marseille
Medal record
World Championships
| Gold medal – first place | 2018 Changwon | 25 m team standard pistol |
| Silver medal – second place | 2018 Changwon | 25 m team center fire pistol |

Boris Artaud (born 26 May 1990) is a French sport shooter.

He participated at the 2018 ISSF World Shooting Championships, winning a medal.
