= Emil Milev =

Bulgarian sports shooter

Personal information
- Born: 2 May 1968 (age 58) Sofia, Bulgaria

Sport
- Sport: Shooting sports
Medal record
Representing Bulgaria
Olympic Games
| Silver medal – second place | 1996 Atlanta | rapid fire pistol |
World Championships
| Silver medal – second place | 1994 Milan | 25m pistol |
European Championships
| Silver medal – second place | 2003 Plzen | 25m pistol |
Representing United States
Pan American Games
| Gold medal – first place | 2011 Guadalajara | 25m pistol |
World Championships
| Bronze medal – third place | 2010 Munich | 25m pistol team |

Emil Milev (Bulgarian: Емил Милев; born 2 May 1968) is a former Bulgarian sport shooter, and currently a sport shooter for the United States, who competed in the 1992 Summer Olympics, in the 1996 Summer Olympics, in the 2000 Summer Olympics, and in the 2004 Summer Olympics. At the 2012 Summer Olympics he, competed for the US, finishing in 13th place.

By qualifying for the 2016 Summer Olympics in the 25m Rapid Fire Pistol men's event, Milev became the second U.S. Olympic shooter ever to qualify for six Games.

In September 2017, Milev was hired as the head coach for The Ohio State University Pistol Team.

Competition History

- 2016 Olympian, USA, 25M Rapid Fire Pistol
- 2015 Pistol Selection, Silver Medalist
- 2015 Spring Selection, Silver Medalist
- 2014 World Cup Finals, Fourth Place
- 2013 World Cup Finals, Gold Medalist
- 2013 World Cup Granada, Bronze Medalist
- 2013 National Championship, Gold Medalist
- 2012 Olympic Games, 13th Place
- 2012 World Cup Milan, 4th Place
- 2011 Pan American Games, Gold Medalist
- 2011 World Cup Final Wroclaw, 5th Place
- 2011 World Cup Munich, Bronze Medalist
- 2011 World Cup Sydney, 8th Place
- 2011 National Championship, Gold Medalist
- 2010 Championships of the Americas, Silver Medalist
- 2005 World Cup Fort Benning, Gold Medalist
- 2004 Olympic Games Athens, 8th Place
- 2003 European Championship Plzen, Silver Medalist
- 2003 World Cup Final Milan, Bronze Medalist
- 2003 World Cup Munich, Silver Medalist
- 2002 World Cup Sydney, Gold Medalist
- 2002 World Cup Shanghai, Gold Medalist
- 2001 World Cup Atlanta, Silver Medalist
- 2001 World Cup Final Munich, Bronze Medalist
- 2000 Olympic Games Sydney, 4th Place
- 1997 World Cup Havana, Gold Medalist
- 1996 World Cup Havana, Gold Medalist
- 1996 Olympic Games Atlanta, Silver Medalist
- 1995 World Cup Final Munich, Silver Medalist
- 1994 World Championship Milan, Silver Medalist
