= Giovanni Bossi =

Italian equestrian

Personal information
- Nationality: Italian
- Born: 31 May 1954 (age 70); Somma Lombardo, Italy

Sport
- Sport: Equestrian

Giovanni Bossi (born 31 May 1954) is an Italian equestrian. He competed in two events at the 1976 Summer Olympics.
