= Renart Suleymanov =

Soviet sport shooter

Personal information
- Born: 27 July 1937 (age 88) Ufa, Soviet Union

Sport
- Sport: Sports shooting
Medal record
Men's shooting
Representing Soviet Union
Olympic Games
Bronze medal – third place	1968 Mexico City	25m pistol

Renart Vafich Suleymanov (born 27 July 1937) is a Russian former sport shooter who competed in the 1968 Summer Olympics.
