= Hermann Sailer =

Austrian sports shooter

Personal information
- Nationality: Austrian
- Born: 1 November 1933 (age 91); Innsbruck, Austria

Sport
- Sport: Sports shooting

Hermann Sailer (born 1 November 1933) is an Austrian sports shooter. He competed at the 1980 Summer Olympics and the 1988 Summer Olympics.
