= Alex Tschui =

Swiss modern pentathlete

Personal information
- Born: 6 February 1939 (age 87) Solothurn, Switzerland

Sport
- Sport: Modern pentathlon

Alex Tschui (born 6 February 1939) is a Swiss modern pentathlete. He competed at the 1968 Summer Olympics.
