= Hynek Hromada =

Czech sport shooter

Personal information
- Born: 16 April 1935 Bratislava, Czechoslovakia
- Died: 23 March 2012 (aged 76)

Sport
- Sport: Sport shooting

Hynek Hromada (16 April 1935 – 23 March 2012) was a Czech sport shooter. He competed for Czechoslovakia at the 1968 Summer Olympics and the 1972 Summer Olympics. He was a trained veterinarian.
