= Ladislav Falta =

Czech former sport shooter (1936–2021)

Personal information
- Born: 30 January 1936 Opočno, Czechoslovakia
- Died: 18 December 2021 (aged 85)

Sport
- Sport: Sports shooting
Medal record
Men's shooting
Representing Czechoslovakia
Olympic Games
| Silver medal – second place | 1972 Munich | rapid fire pistol |

Ladislav Falta (30 January 1936 – 18 December 2021) was a Czech sport shooter who competed in the 1964 Summer Olympics, in the 1968 Summer Olympics, and in the 1972 Summer Olympics. He won a silver medal in the rapid fire pistol event at the 1972 Summer Olympics.

He died on 18 December 2021, at the age of 85.
