= Igor Bakalov =

Soviet sport shooter

Personal information
- Born: 9 December 1939 Sverdlovsk, Soviet Union
- Died: 25 September 1992 (aged 52)

Sport
- Sport: Sports shooting

Igor Bakalov (9 December 1939 – 25 September 1992) was a Soviet sports shooter. He competed at the 1964 Summer Olympics and the 1972 Summer Olympics. He was associated with clubs Dynamo Minsk and SK VS Minsk.
