= Sergei Polyakov =

Russian sport shooter

Personal information
- Born: January 22, 1968 (age 58) Vinnytsia, Soviet Union (now Vinnytsia, Ukraine)
Medal record
Men's shooting
Representing Russia
Olympic Games
Silver medal – second place	2004 Athens	25 m rapid fire pistol

Sergei Vladimirovich Polyakov (Russian: Серге́й Владимирович Поляков, born January 22, 1968, in Vinnytsia) is a Russian sport shooter, specializing in the 25 metre rapid fire pistol event. He won the silver medal at the 2004 Olympic Games in the 25 metre rapid fire pistol event.

Olympic results
Event	2004
25 metre rapid fire pistol	(silver) Silver; 592+100.7
