= Sergei Alifirenko =

Russian sport shooter (born 1959)

Personal information
- Born: 21 January 1959 (age 67)
Medal record
Men's shooting
Representing Russia
Olympic Games
Gold medal – first place	2000 Sydney	25 m rapid fire pistol
Bronze medal – third place	2004 Athens	25 m rapid fire pistol

Sergei Gennadievich Alifirenko (Russian: Серге́й Геннадиевич Алифиренко, born 21 January 1959) is a Russian pistol shooter, originally from Armenia, specializing in the 25 m Rapid Fire Pistol event.

He was born in Kirovakan.

== Career ==
His greatest accomplishment is the gold medal from the 2000 Olympics. Since the rules for the event changed on 1 January 2005, Alifirenko has been most successful in his adaptation to them. He won both the European Championships and the World Cup Final in 2005, and has held several world records. After a bronze medal at the 2006 ISSF World Shooting Championships and a gold medal at the pre-Olympic World Cup competition in Beijing in April 2008, it was a setback for the Russian team when he had to withdraw from the Olympics due to eye illness.

== Doping scandal ==
In October 2008 Alifirenko was suspended for 2 years after he failed a drug test for dexamethasone doping.
