= Seppo Mäkinen =

Finnish sports shooter

Personal information
- Born: 28 February 1941 (age 85) Jämijärvi, Finland

Sport
- Sport: Sports shooting

Seppo Mäkinen (born 28 February 1941) is a retired Finnish sports shooter. He competed in the 25 metre pistol event at the 1972 Summer Olympics.
