= Vladimír Hurt =

Czech sport shooter (born 1948)

Personal information
- Born: 8 May 1948 (age 78) Dobrčice, Czechoslovakia

Sport
- Sport: Sport shooting

Vladimír Hurt (born 8 May 1948) is a Czech former sport shooter. He competed at the 1972, 1976 and the 1980 Summer Olympics.
